= Tondo War =

Military invasion of Tondo by Brunei

Date	c. 1500
Location	Luzon
Result	Bruneian victory
Territorial changes	Establishment of Seludong (Maynila) as a satellite state of Brunei; Brunei had control over the civilisations around the Manila Bay.

Belligerents
Brunei	Tondo

Commanders and leaders
Sultan Bolkiah	Dayang Kalangitan

Units involved
Bruneian Army; Bruneian Navy	Tondo Army: Maharlika; Tondo Navy

Strength
Unknown	Unknown

Casualties and losses
Unknown; probably light	Heavy

The Tondo War (Malay: ڤراڠ توندو, romanized: Perang Tondo, Old Filipino:ᜇᜄ᜔ᜋᜀᜅ᜔ᜆᜓᜈ᜔ᜇᜓᜊᜇᜓᜈᜌ᜔᜶ romanized: ''dagmangtundubadunay'' or also called the Bruneian–Tundun War (Malay: ڤراڠ بروني-توندو, romanized: Perang Brunei-Tondo, Filipino: Digmaang Tondo-Brunay), was a military invasion and later occupation of Tondo in Luzon by the Bruneian Sultanate in the 16th century. The invasion resulted in the formation of the Kingdom of Selurong, the Bruneian Sultanate chose to attack the Kingdom of Tondo in order to break Tondo's monopoly in the China trade.

== Background ==
In c. 1500, prior to the Spanish reaching the Philippines, the Bruneian Empire launched an attack on the Kingdom of Tondo, a significant trading city located on Luzon Island. Bolkiah, the fifth Sultan who controlled the Sultanate from 1485 to 1525, was in charge of the Bruneian Empire at the time of the assault. Given that Bolkiah supervised Brunei's rise to prominence as a powerhouse that swept over the Malay Archipelago, his reign is perhaps best remembered as the empire's golden period. The first records of a Maynila and a Tondo date back to the Martín de Goiti voyage to Manila in 1570.

== Battle ==
Sultan Bolkiah was renowned for frequently traveling overseas in an effort to get fresh perspectives and information that would aid in the development of his nation. But he really started to gather traction in 1500 when he made the decision to visit the Kingdom of Tondo in an effort to increase his power. Bolkiah founded the city of Selurong—later named Maynila, on the other side of the Pasig River shortly after taking over Tondo from its monarch, Lakan Gambang.

Following the Sultan's victory in Tondo, the customary Rajahs, referred to as the Dayang Kalangitan, kept their titles and possessions, but the House of Soliman, which housed the Manila Rajahs, gained control of them. Following this triumph, Brunei ruled over Borneo and the western Philippines for almost a millennium, until starting to decline in influence in the 18th century.

== Aftermath ==
As a result of this victory, Brunei had control over Borneo and the civilisations around the Manila Bay, it only truly begin to lose its holdings in the 1800s. Through Brunei, Tondo was connected to the international commercial network centered at Melaka. It wasn't until Bruneian traders moved into the Manila region at the beginning of the 16th century that Some of populations of Intramuros in Manila and Pampanga become Islamic. Islam had spread as far north as Luzon by the time the Spanish came, and Rajah Sulaiman II governed Manila.
