= House of Salalila =

- Royal family
- Parent family: House of Bolkiah; House of Pasig
- Country: Kingdom of Lusong
- Place of origin: Luzon
- Founded: 1500; 526 years ago
- Founder: Rajah Salalila
- Titles: Rajah of Lusong
- Traditions: Sunni Islam
- Dissolution: 1570

The House of Salalila also known as the House of Soliman was a noble turned royal family who became the ruling family of the Kingdom of Lusong between 1500 and 1571. It was composed of the descendants of Rajah Salalila. The dynasty was formally deposed in 1570 by the Spanish.

== History ==
They were an agnatic line which rose after the Tondo War. They intermarried with the Tondo rajahs. However a huge split began after Prince Ache realized that his cousin, who was ruler of Tondo, was "slyly" and started a conflict spanning until the 1520s.

Ultimately they were defeated by the Spanish in the Battle of Manila in 1571.

== Members ==
- Rajah Salalila and Princess Ysmeria
  - Rajah Matanda
    - Rajah Sulayman
      - Sulayman's descendants

== See also ==
- House of Bolkiah
- House of Digadong
