= Luzones =

Ethnic group of the Philippines

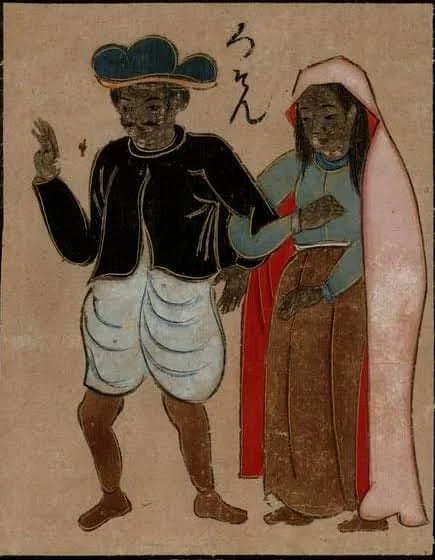
Japanese depiction of Luzones in 1671, Spanish colonial period of the Philippines.

Luzones (Portuguese: Luções, pronounced [luˈsõjʃ]; also Luzones in Spanish) was a demonym used by Portuguese sailors during the early 1500s, referring to the Kapampangan and Tagalog people who lived in Manila Bay, Philippines which was then called Lusong (Kapampangan: Lusung, Portuguese: Luçon). The term was also used for Tagalog settlers in Southern Tagalog region, where they created intensive contact with the Kapampangans.

Eventually, the term "Luzones" would refer to the inhabitants of Luzon island, and later on, would be exclusive to the peoples of the central area of Luzon (now Central Luzon).

None of the Portuguese writers who first used the term in the early 1500s had gone to Lusong themselves, so the term was used specifically to describe the seafarers who settled in or traded with Malay Archipelago at that time. The last known use of the Portuguese term in surviving records was in the early 1520s, when members of Ferdinand Magellan's expedition, notably Antonio Pigafetta, and Rodrigo de Aganduru Moriz used the term to describe seafarers from Lusong whom they encountered on their journeys. This included a "young prince" named Ache who would later become known as Rajah Matanda.

There have been proposals to rename the current Central Luzon region to Luzones (Note: Spanish derivation Luzones is more preferred than original Portuguese name Luções as Philippines was ruled by Spain.) or an abbreviation of the current provinces of the region.

== Primary sources and orthography ==
Surviving primary documents referring to the Luzones (as Luções) include the accounts of Fernão Mendes Pinto (1614); Tomé Pires (whose written documents were published in 1944); and the survivors of Ferdinand Magellan's expedition, including expedition members Gines de Mafra, Rodrigo de Aganduru Moriz, and the Italian scholar Antonio Pigafetta who served as the expedition's primary scribe and published his account in 1524. There were also books from the Chinese Ming dynasty which recorded the presence of a "Kingdom of Luzon" over Luzon island.

These original references deferred to the Portuguese orthography for the term, which spells it out Luções. Later authors, writing after English had become an official language of the Philippines, spell the term out using the English and Spanish orthography, "Luzones."

== Maynila as "Luçon" ==
As written in the book of Dong-Xiyang kao 東西洋考, the Chinese Ming dynasty recorded, before the Spanish and Portuguese came, that there was a "Kingdom of Luzon" that existed over the current island of Luzon.

Portuguese and Spanish accounts from the early to mid 1500s state that Maynila was the same as the Kingdom of Luzon (Note: Scott (1994) notes that Spanish chroniclers continued to use the terms "king" and "kingdom" to describe the rulers and states of Tondo and Maynila until late 1571, when Martin de Goiti's first forays into Bulacan and Pampanga impressed to the Spanish that the alliances of Tondo and Maynila with the Kapampangan states did not include territorial claim or absolute command, although these aren't necessary for kinghood. San Buenaventura (1613, as cited by Junker, 1990 and Scott, 1994) later noted that Tagalogs only applied the term hari (king) to foreign monarchs, rather than their own leaders. Nonetheless, the rulers of Luzon and Manila still referred to themselves initially as raja which could only mean king.) (Portuguese: Luçon (old) or Lução (modern), from the Tagalog or Malay name Lusong and Kapampangan name Lusung), and whose citizens had been called "Luções".

Magellan expedition member Rodrigo de Aganduru Moriz's account of the events of 1521 specifically describes how the Magellan expedition, then under the command of Sebastian Elcano after the death of Magellan, captured of one of the Luções: Prince Ache, who would later be known as Raja Matanda ("the Old King") and was then serving as an admiral for the Bruneian navy. Aganduru Moriz described the "young prince" as being "the Prince of Luzon – or Manila, which is the same." corroborated by fellow expedition member Gines de Mafra and the account of expedition scribe Antonio Pigaffetta.

Ache being the King of Luzon was further confirmed by the Visayan allies of Miguel Lopez de Legaspi, who, learning that he wanted to "befriend" the ruler of Luzon, led him to write a letter to Ache whom he addressed as the King of Luzon.

Kapampangan researcher Ian Christopher Alfonso, however, posits that the demonym Luções was probably expansive enough to include Kapampangan sailors, such as the sailors from Hagonoy and Macabebe who would later be involved in the 1571 Battle of Bangkusay Channel.

== Contacts with the Portuguese (1505s to 1540s) ==
The first contact the Portuguese have of people of Luzon was in the Malabar Coast off Western India at South Asia, wherein; at the Letter from Gaspar Pereira to King Manuel I of Portugal, January 11, 1506, in Cochin. Published in Cartas de Affonso de Albuquerque seguidas de documentos que as elucidam, Vol. 2 (Lisbon: Academia das Sciências de Lisboa, 1898), 354−369 (364-366). Original manuscript in Arquivo Nacional/Torre do Tombo, Corpo Cronológico, Parte I, Maço 5, Doc. 70, fols. 8−8v, a "Luzam" (A person from Luzon) was serving in the Portuguese navy fighting against the Muslims of the Indian coast.

...aboard these two caravels there were many men who serve Your Highness, which I thought was good; those that serve here on the caravel of Nuno Vaz Pereira were António Lopes Teixeira, and luzam, 3 and Luís Mendes da Ilha […]and the [ship’s] clerk, Pero Vaz da Duquesa, and Francisco de Miranda, António de Matos, Cristóvão Raposo; and on Lopo Chanoca’s caravel, Francisco da Silva, [who] died, and Antão de Figueiredo, Álvaro de Brito, Valentim Rebelo, Rui Lopes de Carvalho, Bastião de Souto Mayor. They say it seemed that more than eighty of the Indians died. Things would have been very different if the wind had not died down, and the fire had not broken out on the gundeck killing most of [our men].

Afterwards, when Portuguese first established a presence in Maritime Southeast Asia with their capture of Malacca in 1511, and their contacts with the seafarers they described as Luções (people from "lusong"), the area now known as Manila Bay became the first European accounts of the Tagalog people, as Anthony Reid recounts:

The first European reports on the Tagalogs classify them as "Luzons", a nominally Muslim commercial people trading out of Manila, and "almost one people" with the Malays of Brunei.

=== Descriptions of culture, social organization and trade activities ===
Pires noted that the Luzones were "mostly heathen" and were not much esteemed in Malacca at the time he was there, although he also noted that they were strong, industrious, and given to useful pursuits. Pires' exploration led him to discover that in their own country, the Luções had "foodstuffs, wax, honey, inferior grade gold," and no king; they were governed instead by a group of elders. They traded with tribes from Borneo and Indonesia. Philippine historians note that the language of the Luções was one of the 80 different languages spoken in Malacca When Magellan's ship arrived in the Philippines, Pigafetta noted that there were Luzones there collecting sandalwood. Pigafetta noticed the presence of Luzones who were loading their ship at Timor. Furthermore, the Boxer Codex said that: "The Luções, called Lequios, bring gold and cotton from their land, and trade Chinese silk and porcelain". It is also recorded that every year, the Luções loaded Canton with 175 casks of pepper. In addition to this, they also brought tortoise-shell and resins from their coast, which fetched a high price in China. Overall, as Fernão Lopes de Castanheda writes, “In the fairs of Malacca, the Luções were famed merchants of pepper and gold, even exchanging them for Chinese silk.” Luzon island had large indigenous deposits of gold in the Abra gold trading network sourcing gold from the mountains and rivers of Northern Luzon, to be traded to all the kingdoms of Luzon.

=== Naval and military actions ===
When the Portuguese arrived in Southeast Asia in the early 1500s, they witnessed the Luzones' active involvement in the political and economic affairs of those who sought to take control of the economically strategic highway of the Strait of Malacca.

Fernão Lopes de Castanheda, in História do descobrimento e conquista da Índia (Lisbon, 1551) Vol. 1, pp. 201–205 (Livro V, cap. 34), Malacca garrison (1511–20s); wrote as such:

Portuguese records show Lução soldiers in every garrison of Malaca, prized for their seamanship and ferocity in skirmishes with the Johor fleet.

For instance, the former sultan of Malacca decided to retake his city from the Portuguese with a fleet of ships from Lusung in 1525.

And it was written in Gaspar Correia's, Lendas da Índia (Acad. das Ciências de Lisboa, 1858–64) Vol. 1, pp. 312–318 (Livro III, cap. LV) Malacca restoration (1526):

When the Sultan of Malacca fled, he took refuge with a Luções chieftain; fifty Lução ships then returned him to power, fighting their way through Johor’s blockade.

One famous Luzones was Regimo de Raja, who had been appointed by the Portuguese at Malacca as Temenggung (Jawi: تمڠݢوڠ) or Governor and General. Pires noted that Luzones and Malays (natives of Malacca) had settled in Mjmjam (Perak) and lived in two separate settlements and were "often at variance" or in rivalry with each other.

João de Barros, wrote in Décadas da Ásia (John Stevens transl., The History of the Portuguese in India, vol. 3, London 1777) Vol. 3, pp. 102–105 (Década III, Livro I, cap. XIV) Malacca (c. 1525) & Perak; this:

The ex-Sultan of Malacca enlisted 500 Luções arquebusiers and 20 caracoas, whose veterans later became Temenggung of Perak under the Portuguese.

Pinto noted that there were a number of Luzones in the Islamic fleets that went to battle with the Portuguese in the Philippines during the 16th century. In 1539 Filipinos (Luções) formed part of a Batak-Menangkabau army which besieged Aceh, as well as of the Acehnese fleet which raised the siege under command of Turkish Heredim Mafamede sent out from Suez by his uncle, Suleiman, Viceroy of Cairo. When this fleet later took Aru on the Strait of Malacca, it contained 4,000 Muslims from Turkey, Abyssinia, Malabar, Gujarat and Luzon, and following his victory, Heredim left a hand-picked garrison there under the command of a Filipino by the name of Sapetu Diraja. Sapetu Diraja was then assigned by the Sultan of Aceh the task of holding Aru (northeast Sumatra) in 1540.

Pinto also says one was named leader of the Malays remaining in the Moluccas Islands after the Portuguese conquest in 1511.

Pigafetta notes that one of them was in command of the Brunei fleet in 1521.

Of which, João de Barros wrote in Décadas da Ásia (John Stevens transl., The History of the Portuguese in India, vol. 3, London 1777) Vol. 3, pp. 102–105 (Década III, Livro I, cap. XIV) Malacca (c. 1525) & Perak, the following:

A fleet of twelve Luçon caracoas under the same leader joined the Brunei armada against Lawé. Their knowledge of these coasts was unmatched, and they bore the brunt of the assault.

However, the Luzones did not only fight on the side of the Muslims. Pinto says they were also apparently among the natives of the Philippines who fought the Muslims in 1538.

On Mainland Southeast Asia, Luzones aided the Burmese king in his invasion of Siam in 1547. At the same time, Luzones fought alongside the Siamese king and faced the same elephant army of the Burmese king in the defence of the Siamese capital at Ayuthaya.

Diogo do Couto wrote in, Décadas da Ásia (Lisbon, 1778) Vol. 5, pp. 95–100 (Década VIII, Livro II, cap. V) Siam (1547); this of them:

Under their chief Balagtas, 300 Luções fought for the King of Siam against Burmese invaders—so effective that the Siamese granted them land.

The fact that the Siamese ennobled the Luções by granting them royal land and that Luções military and trade activity reached as far as Sri Lanka in South Asia where Lungshanoid pottery made in Luzon were discovered in burials is proof that the Luções formed a long range geographic network applying soft power among the many nations the Philippines traded and worked with.

Scholars have thus suggested that they could have been mercenaries valued by all sides. The Luzones had military and commercial interests mainly across Southeast Asia with some minor reach in East Asia and South Asia, so much so that the Portuguese soldier and historian Joao de Barros considered the Luções, who were militarily and commercially active across the region, "the most warlike and valiant of these parts."

(Book) Libro, "Da Ásia de João de Barros: Dos feitos que os Portuguezes fizeram no descubrimento e conquista dos mares e terras do Oriente" (Page 467):

Quote:"Da qual Armada era Capito mór Lacfamana, é Coja Câmeçum Sota- Capitão , e com elle vinha o-Capitão dos Luções, que he huma gente da Ilha de BorNeo, a mais guerreira, e bellicofa daquel- las partes."

Translation: "Lacsamana was the Captain-General of this fleet, with Coja Câmeçum serving as second-in-command; accompanying him was the captain of the Luções—a people around the island of Borneo who are the most warlike and bellicose in these parts."

Ultimately, Fernão Mendes Pinto wrote in Peregrinação (C. R. Boxer, ed., The Travels of Mendes Pinto, vol. 1, Hakluyt Society, 1956) pp. 256–261 (Book II, ch. XLIX) Aceh (1539), these words, of the Luções:

Sapetu Diraja, a chieftain from Luçon, brought with him two hundred Luções veterans to serve the Sultan of Acheh. Their valor and skill with the kris so impressed the court that they were retained as the Sultan’s guard.

That they were assigned as the Sultan's royal guard is proof of Luçoes men's physical strength, martial prowess, and masculine attractiveness; as during that time period, among Medieval kingdoms, that office was only reserved to the most strong, intelligent, handsome, attractive, virile, aristocratic, and combat-worthy, of warriors.

=== Luzones as sailors ===
The Luzones were also pioneer seafarers, and it is recorded that the Portuguese were not only witnesses but also direct beneficiaries of Lusung's involvement. Many Luzones chose Malacca as their base of operations because of its strategic importance. When the Portuguese finally took Malacca in 1512, the resident Luzones held important government posts in the former sultanate. They were also large-scale exporters and ship owners that regularly sent junks to China, Brunei, Sumatra, Siam and Sunda. One Lusung official by the name of Surya Diraja annually sent 175 tons of pepper to China and had to pay the Portuguese 9000 cruzados in gold to retain his plantation. His ships became part of the first Portuguese fleet that paid an official visit to the Chinese empire in 1517.

The Portuguese were soon relying on Luzones bureaucrats for the administration of Malacca and Luzones warriors, ships and pilots for their military and commercial ventures in East Asia.

It was through the Luzones, who regularly sent ships to China, that the Portuguese discovered the ports of Canton in 1514. It was on Luzones ships that the Portuguese were able to send their first diplomatic mission to China 1517. The Portuguese had the Luzones to thank for when they finally established their base at Macao in the mid-1500s.

The Luzones were also instrumental in guiding Portuguese ships to discover Japan. The Western world first heard of Japan through Marco Polo and then the Portuguese. But it was through the Luzones that the Portuguese had their first encounter with the Japanese. The Portuguese king commissioned his subjects to get good pilots that could guide them beyond the seas of China and Malacca. In 1540, the Portuguese king's factor in Brunei, Brás Baião, recommended to his king the employment of Lusung pilots because of their reputation as "discoverers." Thus it was through Luzones navigators that Portuguese ships found their way to Japan in 1543. In 1547, Jesuit missionary and Catholic saint Francis Xavier encountered his first Japanese convert from Satsuma disembarking from a Lusung ship in Malacca.

== Contact with the survivors of Magellan's expedition (1521) ==
Aside from the Portuguese, the Luzones were also encountered by the survivors of the Magellan Expedition, who were under the command of Sebastian Elcano, in 1521. This encounter was mentioned by expedition scribe Antonio Pigafetta and extensively described in an account by expedition members Gines de Mafra, Rodrigo de Aganduru Moriz, among others.

The Aganduru Moriz account describes how Elcano's crew was attacked somewhere off the southeastern tip of Borneo by a Bruneian fleet commanded by one of the Luzones. Historians such as William Henry Scott and Luis Camara Dery assert that this commander of the Bruneian Fleet was actually the young prince Ache of Maynila, a grandson of the Bruneian sultan who would later become Maynila's Rajah Matanda.

Under orders from his grandfather the Sultan of Brunei, Ache had previously sacked the Buddhist city of Loue in Southwest Borneo for being faithful to the old religion and rebelling against the authority of Sultanate. Ache had just won a naval victory at the time, and was supposed to be on his way to marry a cousin – a typical custom by which Tagalog nobles at that time gained influence and power.

Dery suggests that Ache's decision to attack must have been influenced by a desire to bring Elcano's ship back to Manila bay for use as leverage against his cousin, the ruler of Tondo, who was usurping territory from Ache's mother, who was ruling Maynila at the time.

Elcano, however, was able to defeat and capture Ache. According to Scott, Ache was eventually released after a ransom was paid. Nevertheless, Ache left a Spanish speaking Moor in Elcano's Crew to assist the ship on the way back to Spain, "a Moor who understood something of our Castilian language, who was called Pazeculan." This knowledge of the Spanish language was scattered across the Indian Ocean and even into Southeast Asia after the Castilian conquest of the Emirate of Granada forced the Spanish-speaking Granadan Muslims to migrate across the Muslim world even until Islamic Manila.

== End of historical references (after 1571) ==
Portuguese references to the "Luções" ended after the arrival of Miguel Lopez de Legaspi to Manila, notes Anthony Reid:

"Luzons disappear from descriptions of the archipelago after the Spanish conquest of Manila in 1571, presumably assimilating to the Malay diaspora."

The Spaniards together with their Mexican and Visayan allies had exploited political divisions in Luzon to support one faction against the other. The grandson of Miguel Lopez de Legaspi, a conquistador born in Mexico, Juan de Salcedo, pursued a romance with the Tondo princess, Kandarapa (as Tondo was a rival Hindu polity of Muslim Manila). The Luções easily switched allegiance from the Ottoman Caliphate to the Iberian Union after the Spanish incorporation of Luzon.

The book Wakan Sansai Zue, a Japanese translation of Ming era history, recorded that before Spain came, the emperor of China referred to the rulers of Luzon as "kings" (呂宋國王). However, after Spanish occupation, Luzon's rulers were only referred to as lords or princes (呂宋國主).

== See also ==
- Pintados
- East Indies
- Malay world
- Visayans
- Tagalog people
- Lakandula
- Portuguese Malacca
- Maynila (historical polity)

== Additional sources ==
- Scott, William Henry (1994). Barangay: Sixteenth Century Philippine Culture and Society. Quezon City: Ateneo de Manila University Press. ISBN 971-550-135-4.
