= Warfare in pre-colonial Philippines =

Interstate warfare was practiced in the Philippines prior to Spanish colonization.

== Tactics and strategies ==
The tactics and strategies prevalent during the Philippines' early historic period were shaped by the archipelagic nature of the islands.

=== Raiding and coastal defense ===
Participating in land and sea raids were an essential part of the duties of the timawa and maharlika. These raids, locally known as pangangayaw, are usually regular annual expeditions undertaken by the community (similar to the Vikings) against enemies and enemies of their allies. Participation and conduct in raids and other battles were recorded permanently by the timawa and the tumao in the form of tattoos on their bodies, hence the Spanish name for them—pintados (literally "the painted ones").

=== Scorched earth tactics ===
The Rajahnate of Cebu fought against the Moro pirates, known as magalos (literally "destroyers of peace"), from Mindanao. The islands the rajahnate was in, were collectively known as Pulua Kang Dayang or Kangdaya (literally "[the islands] which belong to Daya").

Sri Lumay was noted for his strict policies in defending against Moro raiders and slavers from Mindanao. His use of scorched earth tactics to repel invaders gave rise to the name Kang Sri Lumayng Sugbo (literally "that of Sri Lumay's great fire") to the town, which was later shortened to Sugbo ("scorched earth").

=== Ambush and surprise attack tactics ===
Another strategy used throughout the islands were ambushes where they would lead large enemy troops into an ambush of surrounding men or attacking enemies from behind when their defenses are down. The Spanish conquistador Miguel de Loarca described the preparations and the undertaking of such raids in his book Relacion de las Yslas Filipinas (1582).

=== Artillery ===
Native bronze cannons known as lantakas were extensively used by the indigenous polities throughout the archipelago, the fortified polity of Maynila and Cainta used various sizes of lantakas for fort defense. Rajah Sulayman of Maynila was also known to have big iron cannons measuring around 17 feet (5.18 m), it was made by a native blacksmith and cannon maker known as Panday Pira. Several native warships such as the karakoa and lanong were equipped with lelas and lantakas and was used against enemy ships and also for naval bombardment against enemy settlements during raids.

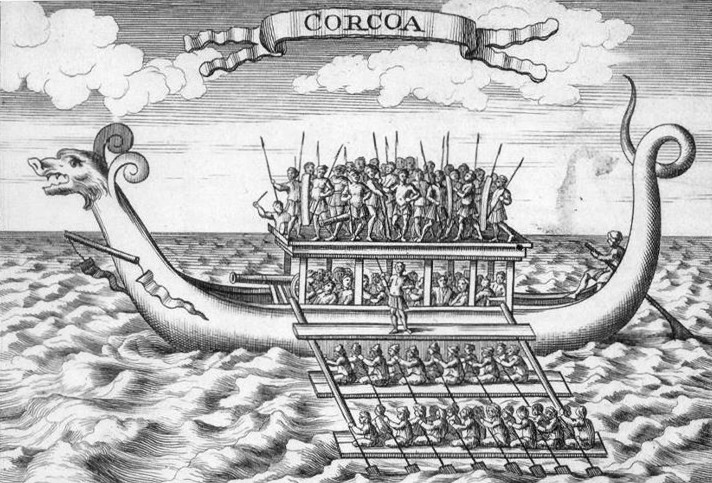
A karakoa armed with a lantaka

In the Battle of Bangkusay Channel on 1571, a Spanish chronicler mentioned that the native warships was equipped with one or two culverins, probably mistaken the lantakas due to lack of knowledge on native names.

== Military technology ==
=== Melee weapons ===
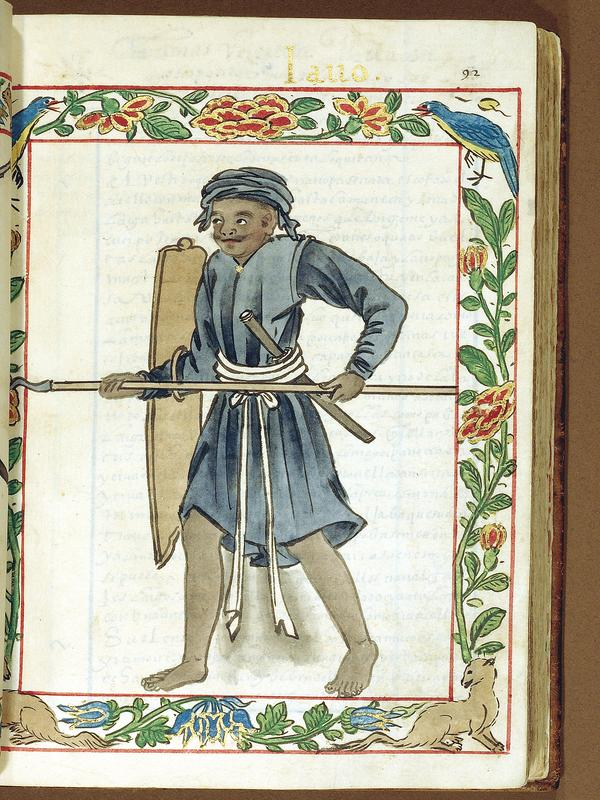
A kawal holding sibat

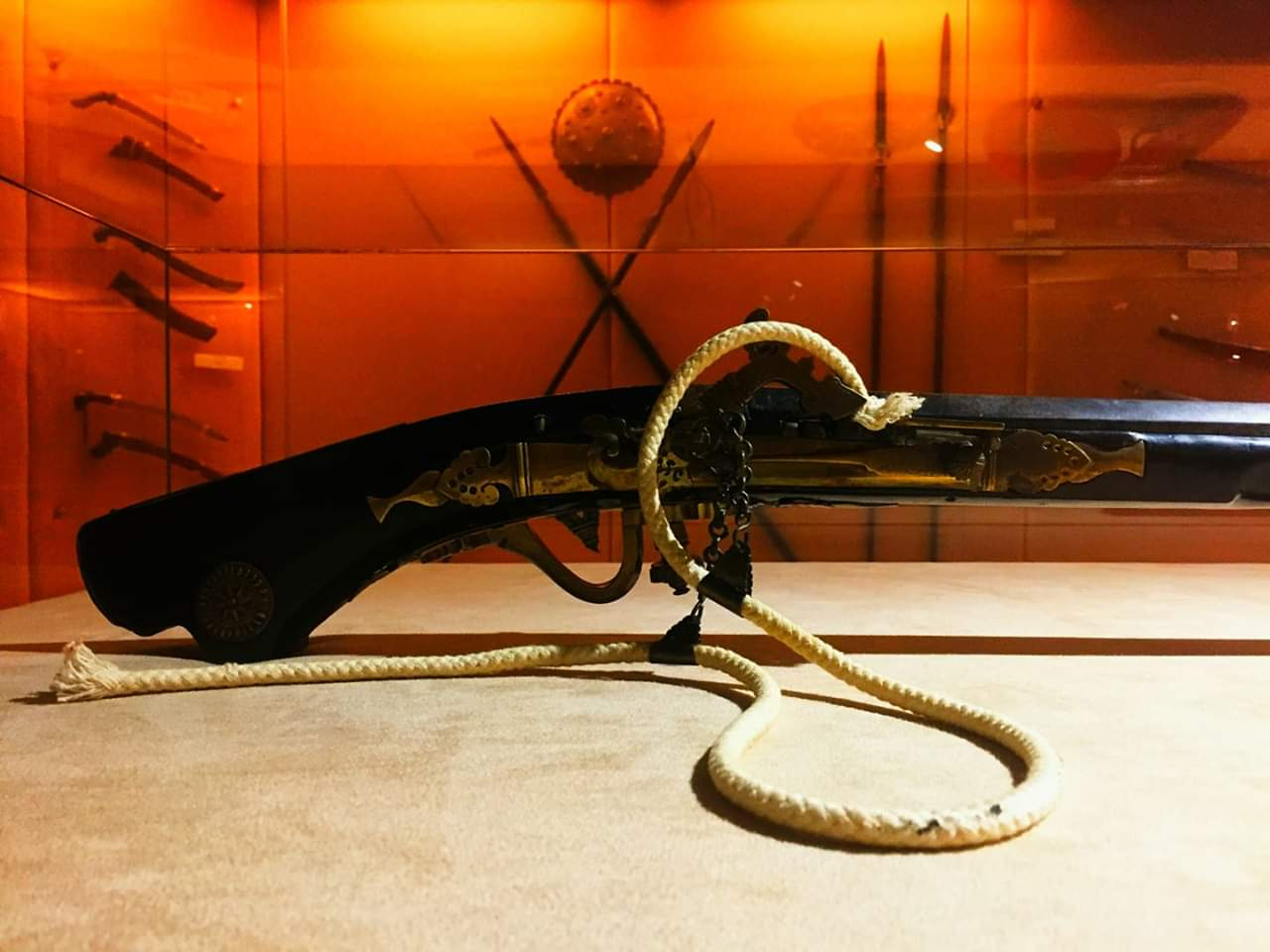
Close up of firing mechanism (snap matchlock) and detail of a Malay istinggar, which was called astinggal in the Philippines

The making of swords involved elaborate rituals that were based mainly on the auspicious conjunctions of planets. The passage of the sword from the maker entailed a mystical ceremony that was coupled with beliefs. The lowlanders of Luzon no longer used the bararao, while the Moros and animists of the south still continue the tradition of making kampilan and kris. Swords (kalis and kampilan) were either straight or wavy double-edged, with bronze or iron blades and hilts made of hardwoods, bone, antler, shell, or, for high ranking individuals, gold encrusted with precious stones.

=== Firearms ===
Firearms in the form of matchlock arquebuses were also locally manufactured and used by the natives. The most fearsome among these native guns was the lantaka, which were portable swivel guns. Another type of firearm found in the Philippines is called astinggal, mostly encountered in Muslim-controlled areas of the south. These arquebuses also appeared in Palawan through contacts with Borneo, as recorded by Antonio Pigafetta.

=== Artillery ===
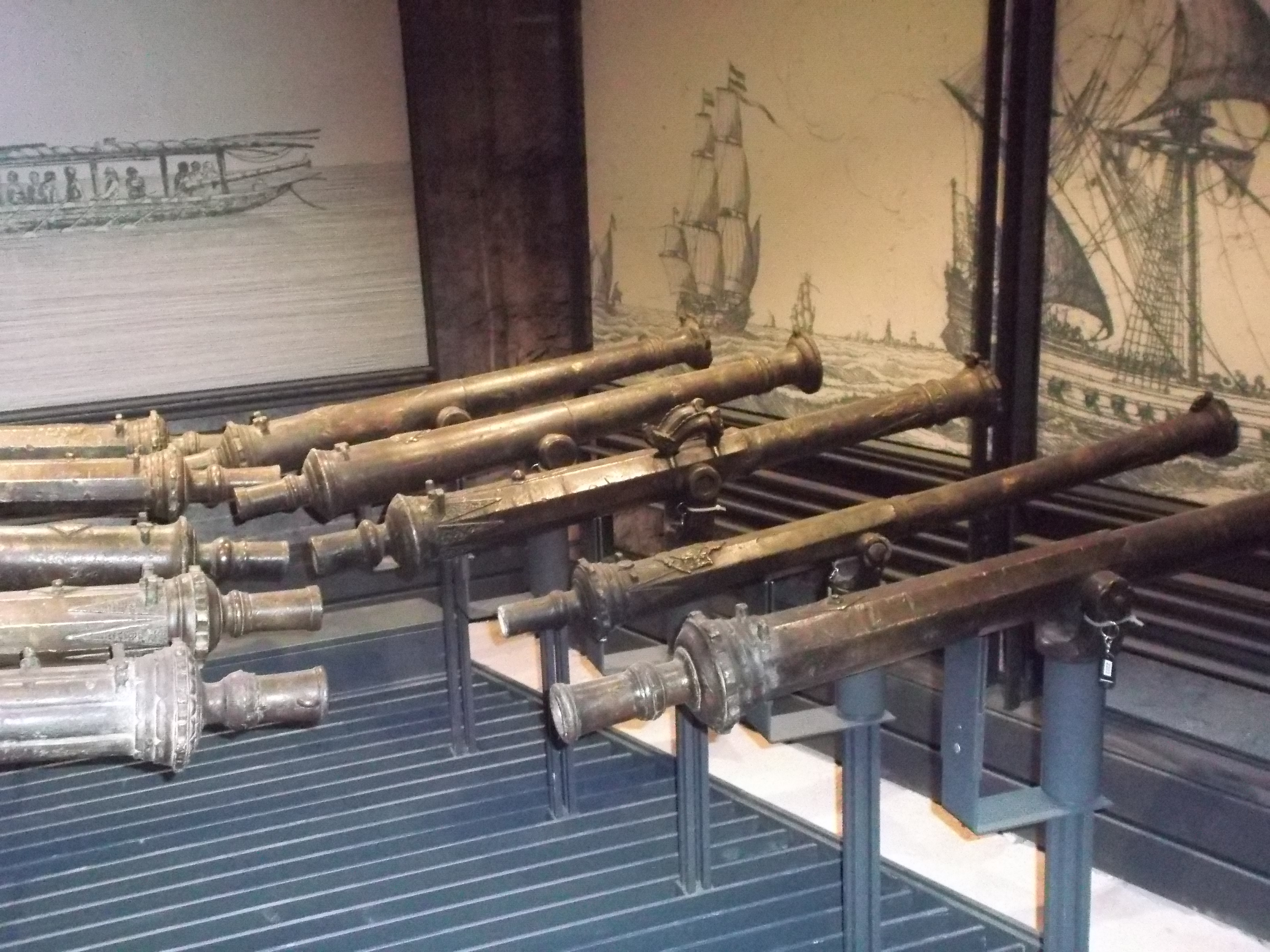
Collection of lantakas in a museum

Pre-colonial Filipinos also used larger cannons made of iron and resembling culverins that provided heavier firepower. They were sometimes mounted on a boat or fortification that can be wheeled, allowing the gunner to quickly track a moving target. The iron cannon at Rajah Sulayman's house was about 17 feet (5.18 m) and was made out of clay and wax moulds.

=== Shields ===
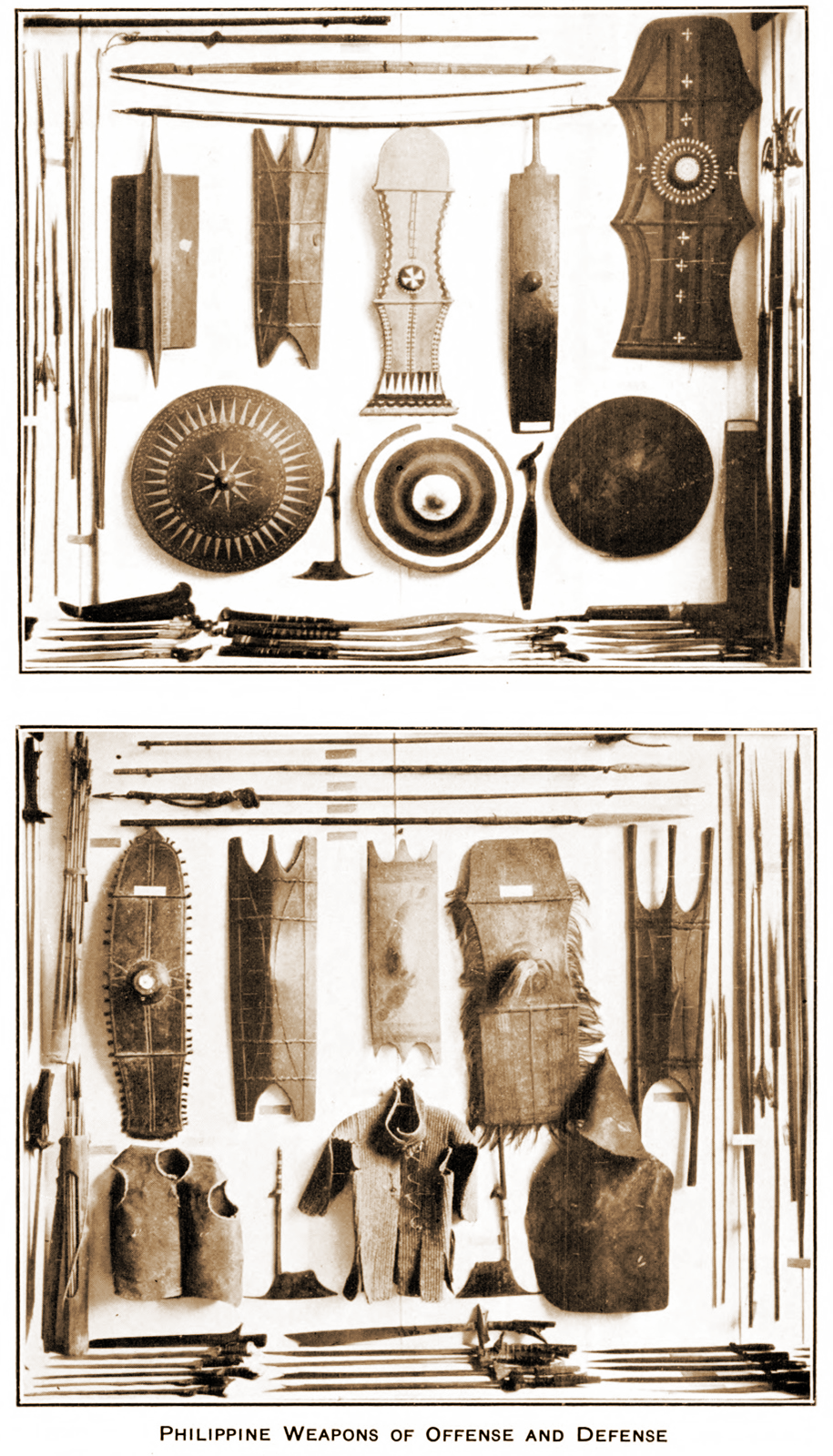
Armors and shields in the Philippines

Shields were important defensive weapons in all lowland societies of the Philippines. Visayan shields, kalasag, were made of light, fibrous wood designed to enmesh any spear or dagger that penetrated its surface and to prevent their retrieval by the enemy. Shields were strengthened and decorated with an elaborate rattan binding on the front, which was also coated with a resin that turned rock-hard upon drying. These shields were generally 0.5 meters by 1.5 meters in size and, along with missile deflecting helmets, provided full body protection that was difficult to penetrate. Thus, it is not surprising that most of the raids that were successful in terms of taking captives and heads, were surprise ambushes that literally caught the enemy with their shields down.

=== Armor ===
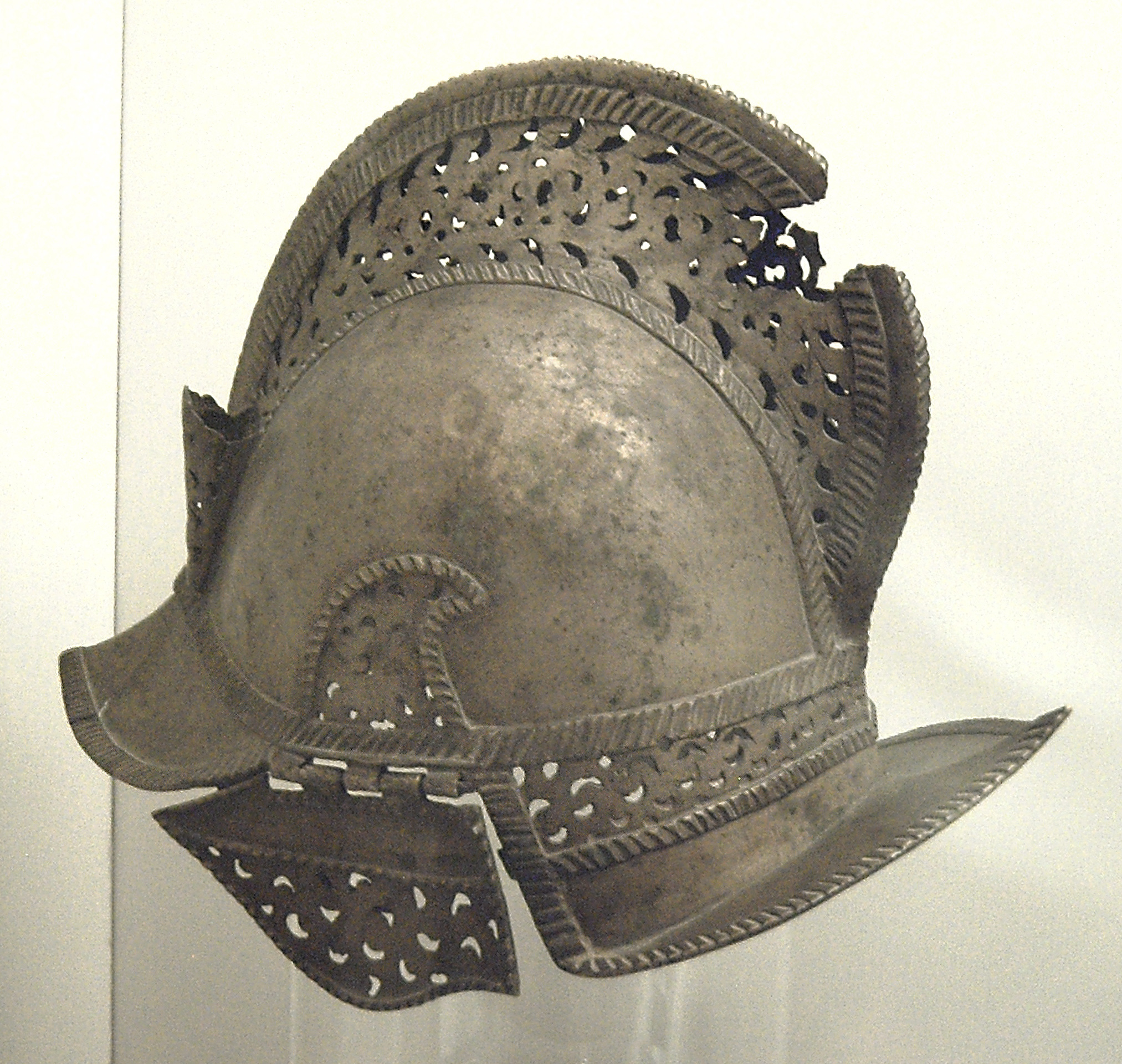
The Moros later adopted European armour and firearms during their wars with Spain and rebellion (Embadir), like this of an 18th or 19th century brass morion helmet.

Pre-colonial Filipinos made excellent armor for use on the battlefield, and swords were an important part of native weaponry. In some parts of the Philippines, armor was made from diverse materials such as cordage, bamboo, tree bark, sharkskin, and water buffalo hide to deflect piercing blows by cutlasses or spear points. Tagalog people were known to have used round bucklers, carabao horn corselets, breastplates and padded armor. They also occasionally use Chinese peak helmets and Japanese katana. Visayan chainmail and cuirasses were called barote: quilted or corded body armor. Spaniards called these escaupiles, after the cotton-padded exemplars they found in the New World. The barote was woven of thick braided abacá or bark cords, tight enough to be waterproof and knotted intricately so that cuts did not spread. Burlap was worn against the body under the barote; the body armor itself extended to the elbow and knee with an ankle-length variety with sleeves for manning defenses, although for greater agility confident warriors preferred to go without them. Pakil and batung-batung were breastplates and back plates made of bamboo bark, hardwood like ebony or in Mindanao, and carabao horn or elephant hide from Jolo. Sharkskin was used effectively for helmets or moriones.

=== Fortifications ===
Ancient Filipinos built strong fortresses called kota or moog to protect their communities. The Moros, in particular, had armor that covered the entire body from the top of the head to the toes. The Igorots built forts made of stone walls that averaged several meters in width and about two to three times the width in height around 2000 BC. Spanish descriptions indicate that the typical fortifications consisted of raised earthworks with a wooden palisade along the top (called a kuta in Tagalog) surrounded by a ditch or water-filled moat. However, local variations on construction technique were specific to the local environment. In Bicol, bamboo towers called bantara were built behind the fortifications as a stand for archers armed with long bows. There are reports of well constructed wooden fortifications around the political centers of Manila, Tondo, Cebu, Mindoro and numerous other coastal towns.

The Ivatan people of the northern islands of Batanes often built fortifications to protect themselves during times of war. They built their so-called idjangs on hills and elevated areas. These fortifications were likened to European castles because of their purpose. Usually, the only entrance to the castles would be via a rope ladder that would only be lowered for the villagers and could be kept away when invaders arrived.

=== Naval technologies ===
==== The Karakoa ====
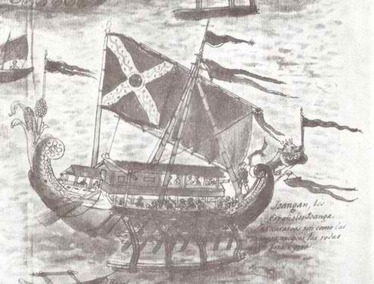
17th-century depiction of a Spanish joangan from Historia de las islas e indios de Bisayas (1668) by Francisco Ignacio Alcina.

Philippine ships, such as the karakoa or korkoa, were of excellent quality and some of them were used by the Spaniards in expeditions against rebellious tribes and Dutch and British forces. Some of the larger rowed vessels held up to a hundred rowers on each side besides a contingent of armed troops. Generally, the larger vessels held at least one lantaka at the front of the vessel or another one placed at the stern. Philippine sailing ships called praos had double sails that seemed to rise well over a hundred feet from the surface of the water. Despite their large size, these ships had double outriggers. Some of the larger sailing ships, however, did not have outriggers.

== Historical incidents ==
Arabic author Al Ya'akubi writing in 800 CE recorded that the kingdom of Musa (Muja, which is old Brunei) was in alliance with the kingdom of Mayd (either Ma-i or Madja-as in the Philippines), against the Chinese Empire which they waged war against.

Between 1174 and 1190 CE, Chau Ju-Kua, a travelling Chinese government bureaucrat, reported a group of "ferocious raiders" near the coast of Fujian. Chau called them Pishoye and believed they were from the south of Taiwan (Formosa). In the 1500s, the people of Luzon were called the Luções. They gained power in their region through effective trade and through military campaigns in Myanmar, Malacca and East Timor, where Lucoes were employed as traders and mercenaries.

In 1547 CE, Luções warriors supported the Burmese king in his invasion of Siam. At the same time, Lusung warriors fought with the Siamese king against the elephant army of the Burmese king in the defence of the Siamese capital at Ayuthaya, where they were employed as traders and mercenaries.

In 1521, the Visayan ruler of the indigenous polity of Mactan, Lapu-Lapu, in Cebu organized the first recorded military action against the Spanish colonizers in the Battle of Mactan.

The former sultan of Malacca decided to retake his city from the Portuguese with a fleet of ships from Lusung in 1525 AD. Luções (warriors from Luzon) aided the Burmese king in his invasion of Siam in 1547 AD. At the same time, Lusung warriors fought alongside the Siamese king and faced the same elephant army of the Burmese king in the defence of the Siamese capital at Ayuthaya.

In 1570, the Battle of Manila was fought in Manila between the native Filipinos led by Rajah Sulayman, a vassal to the Sultan of Brunei, and the Spaniards led by Martin de Goiti, Maestre de Campo, on May 24, 1570. The forces under Goiti were victorious and as a result, Manila became the capital of the Spanish East Indies.

The Battle of Bangkusay, on June 3, 1571, was a naval engagement that marked the last resistance by locals to the Spanish Empire's occupation and colonization of the Pasig River delta, which had been the site of the indigenous polities of Maynila and Tondo. Tarik Sulayman, the chief of Macabebes, refused to ally with the Spanish and decided to mount an attack at Bangkusay Channel on Spanish forces, led by Miguel López de Legazpi. Sulayman's forces were defeated, and Sulayman himself was killed. The Spanish victory in Bangkusay and Legazpi's alliance with Lakandula of Tondo, enabled the Spaniards to establish themselves throughout the city and its neighboring towns.

When the Spanish forces of Miguel López de Legazpi first established the City of Manila in 1571, Cainta was one of the surrounding polities who went to Manila to negotiate for friendship with Manila. However, Cainta's envoys noted the small size of Legaspi's forces and decided to withdraw their offer of friendship, since Cainta was a fortified polity which was perfectly capable of defending itself. In August 1571, Legazpi assigned his nephew, Juan de Salcedo, to "pacify" Cainta. After travelling several days upriver, Salcedo lay siege to the city, and eventually found a weak spot on the wall. The final Spanish attack over 400 residents of Cainta killed.

From 1660 to 1673, the Bruneian Empire fought in a civil war, and the Sultanate of Sulu provided help for the Sultan Muhyiddin of Brunei. After the victory of Muhyiddin and his forces, the eastern part of Sabah was given to the Sulu Sultanate as a reward for assisting Muhyiddin's forces.

== See also ==
- History of the Philippines
- History of the Philippines (900–1521)
- Armed Forces of the Philippines
- Philippine Revolutionary Army
- Burmese–Siamese War
- Cultural achievements of pre-colonial Philippines
- Maharlika
- Timawa
- Juramentado
- List of wars involving the Philippines
- List of conflicts in the Philippines
- Battle of the Philippines
