= Regimo Diraja =

Temenggung of Portuguese Malacca
- Reign: fl. 1511
- Born: Luzon
- Died: 1513; Portuguese Malacca

Regimo Diraja was a Filipino (Luzones) general, governor, shipping operator and spice magnate who found fortune in the Portuguese Malacca. He was prominent and highly influential in Malacca even before the Portuguese came and after the Capture of Malacca on 1511, the Portuguese appointed him as a Temenggung (Sea Lord) (Jawi: تمڠݢوڠ) or a governor and chief general responsible for overseeing of the maritime trade, protecting the monarch and policing the state. Before becoming a Temenggung, he was already the head of the fleet of junks which conducts trade with Brunei, China, Pasai, Siam and Sunda and also protected commerce between the Indian Ocean, the Strait of Malacca, the South China Sea, and the medieval maritime principalities of the Philippines. His father-in-law and wife carried on his maritime trading business after his death on 1513.
