= Maynila (historical polity) =

Major historical polity in Luzon

Maynila Bayan ng Maynila (Tagalog) ᜊᜌᜈ᜔ ᜈᜅ᜔ ᜋᜌ᜔ᜈᜒᜎ (Baybayin) کراجاءن مانيلا (Malay)
- c. 1500–1571
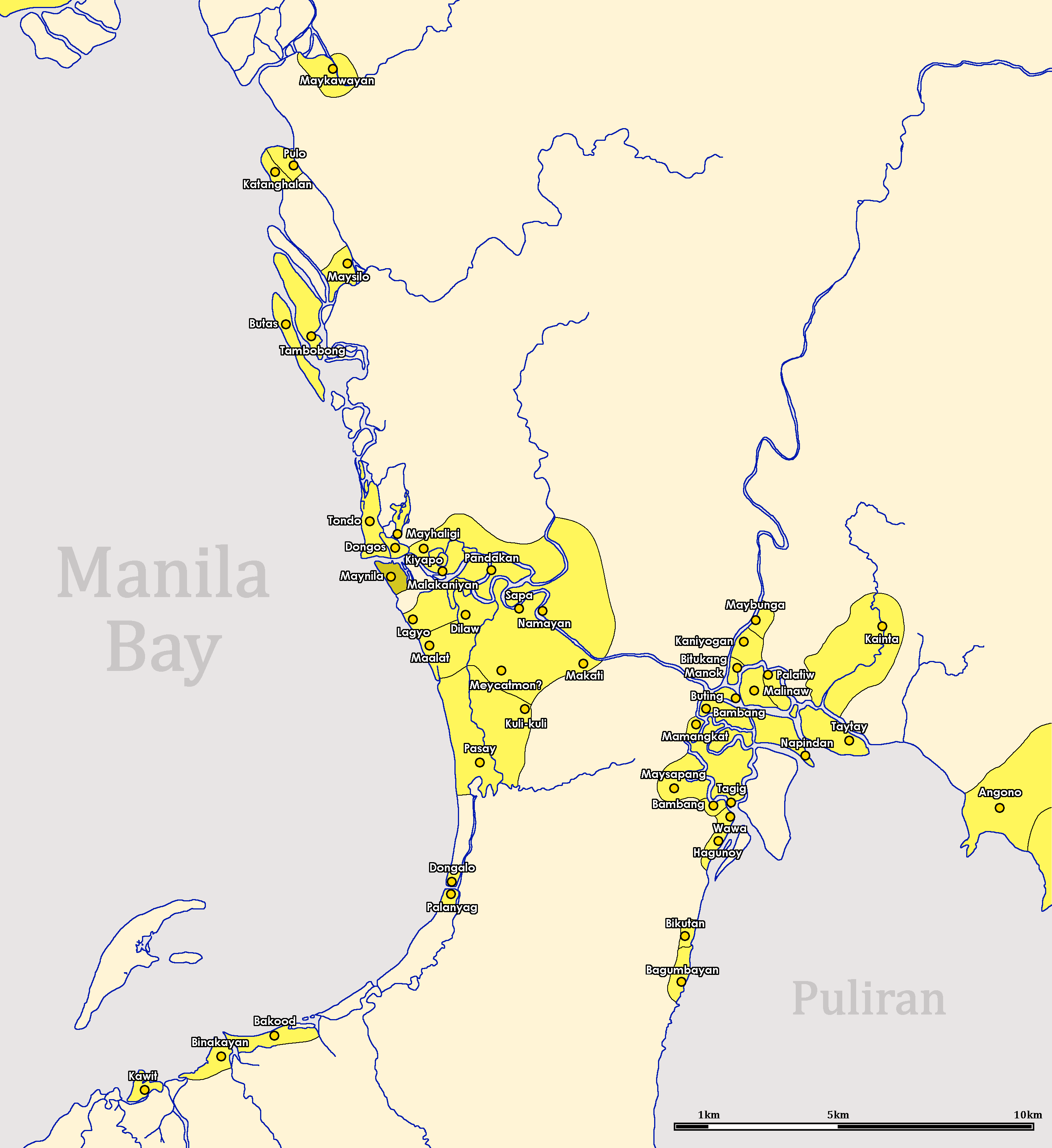
- Location of the fortified bayan of Maynila (colored yellow) by 1570.

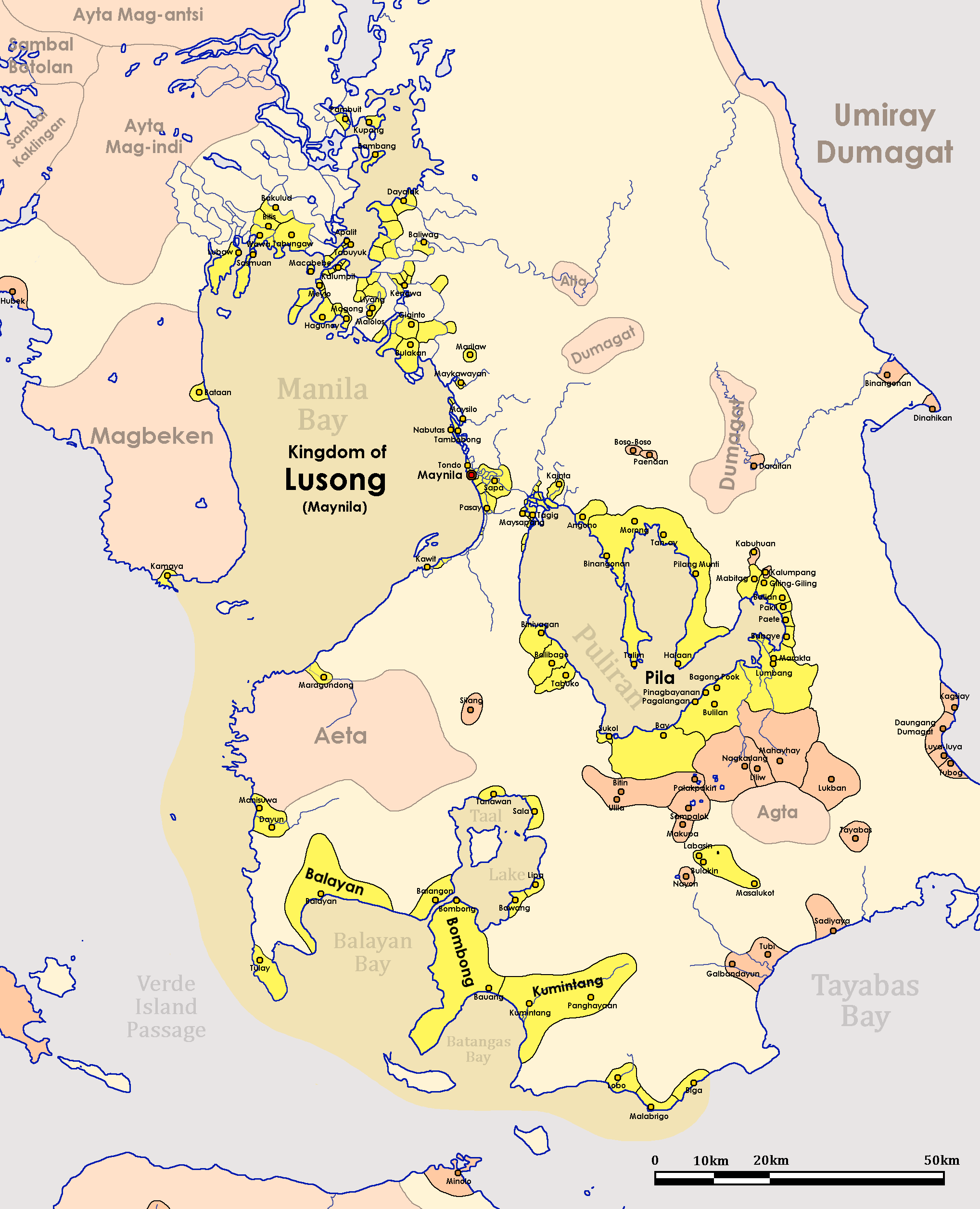
- The Kingdom of Maynila (Lusong) within the Tagalog and Kapampangan regions in 1570.
- Capital: Manila
- Common languages: Old Tagalog, Malay
- Religion: Islam, (Note: Among the royalty, nobility, and some freemen (Scott, 1994).) Hinduised Tagalog polytheism
- Government: Absolute Monarchy
- Rajah
  - c. 1500s – c. 1521: Salalila
  - c. 1521 – August 1572: Ache
  - 1571–1575: Sulayman
- Historical era: Middle Ages
  - Establishment of Maynila and conversion to Islam: c. 1500
  - Death of Rajah Salalila and territorial conflicts with Tondo: c. before 1521
  - Marriage between Prince Ache and a princess of Brunei: 1521
  - Capture and release of Prince Ache by the first Castilian expedition to the Moluccas: 1521
  - Battle of Manila: 1570
  - Rajah Ache's allegiance to the Kingdom of Spain: 1571
- Currency: Gold coin
Preceded by	Succeeded by
Sapa	Captaincy General of the Philippines; Manila (province)
- Today part of: Philippines

Maynila, also known commonly as Manila and as the Kingdom of Maynila or Lusong, was a major Tagalog bayan ("country" or "city-state") situated along the modern-day district of Intramuros in the city of Manila, at the southern bank of the Pasig River. It was considered to be one of the most cosmopolitan of the early historic settlements on the Philippine archipelago, fortified with a wooden palisade which was appropriate for the predominant battle tactics of its time. At the northern bank of the river lies the separately-led polity of Tondo.

Maynila was led by paramount rulers who were referred to using the Malay title of "Raja". Maynila is sometimes interpreted to be the Kingdom of Luzon, although some historians suggest that this might rather refer to the Manila Bay region as a whole, expanding the possible dominion of the kingdom.

The earliest oral traditions suggest that Maynila was founded as a Muslim settlement as early as the 1250s, supposedly supplanting an even older pre-Islamic settlement. However, the earliest archeological findings for organized human settlements in the area dates to around 1500s. By the 16th century, it was already an important trading center, with extensive political ties with the Sultanate of Brunei and extensive trade relations with traders from the Ming dynasty. With Tondo, the polity on the northern part of the Pasig River delta, it established a duopoly on the intraarchipelagic trade of Chinese goods.

For political reasons, the historical rulers of Maynila maintained close cognatic ties through intermarriage with the ruling houses of the Sultanate of Brunei, but Brunei's political influence over Maynila is not considered to have extended to military or political rule. Intermarriage was a common strategy for large thalassocratic states such as Brunei to extend their influence, and for local rulers such as those of Maynila to help strengthen their family claims to nobility. Actual political and military rule over the large distances characteristic of Maritime Southeast Asia was not possible until relatively modern times.

By 1570, Maynila was under the rule of two paramount rulers (the more senior Rajah Matanda and the younger Rajah Sulayman), who in turn had several lower-ranked rulers ("datu") under them. This was the political situation encountered by Martin de Goiti when he attacked Maynila in May of that year. This "Battle of Maynila" ended with a fire that destroyed the fortified settlement of Maynila, although it is not clear whether the fire was set by Goiti or by the inhabitants themselves as part of the scorched earth tactics typically used in the archipelago during that era.

Maynila had been partially rebuilt by the following year, 1571, when the full forces of de Goiti's superior, Miguel López de Legazpi, arrived in the city to claim it as a territory of New Spain. After extensive negotiations with the leaders of Maynila and those of the neighboring settlement in Tondo, Maynila was declared as the new Spanish city of Manila on June 24, 1571, effectively ending Maynila's history as an independent polity.

== Sources ==
Laura Lee Junker, in her 1998 review of primary sources regarding archaic Philippine polities, lists the primary sources of information regarding the river delta polities of Maynila and Tondo as "Malay texts, Philippine oral traditions, Chinese tributary records and geographies, early Spanish writings, and archaeological evidence."

Junker noted the inherent biases of each of the written sources, emphasizing the need to counter-check their narratives with one another, and with empirical archeological evidence.

== Etymology ==
Maynilà comes from the Tagalog phrase may-nilà, which translates to "where indigo is found". Nilà is derived from the Sanskrit word nīla (नील) which refers to indigo, and, by extension, to several plant species from which this natural dye can be extracted. The Maynilà name is more likely in reference to the presence of indigo-yielding plants growing in the area surrounding the settlement, rather than Maynilà being known as a settlement that trades in indigo dye, since the settlement was founded several hundred years before indigo dye extraction became an important economic activity in the area in the 18th century. The native Tagalog name for the indigo plant, tayum (or variations thereof) actually finds use in another toponym within the Manila area: Tayuman, "where the indigo (plant) is."

An inaccurate but nevertheless persistent etymology asserts the origin of the placename as may-nilad ("where nilad is found"). Here, nilad refers to either: (incorrectly) the water hyacinth (Eichhornia crassipes), which is a colonial introduction to the Philippines from South America and therefore could not have been the plant species referred to in the toponym; or (correctly) a shrub-like tree (Scyphiphora hydrophyllacea, formerly Ixora manila Blanco) found in or near mangrove swamps, and known as nilád or nilár in Tagalog.

From a linguistic perspective, it is unlikely for native Tagalog speakers to completely drop the final consonant /d/ in nilad to achieve the present form Maynilà. Historian Ambeth Ocampo also states that in all early documents the place had always been called "Maynilà" (eventually adopted into Spanish as Manila) — and never referred to with the final /d/. Despite the may-nilad etymology being erroneous, it continues to be perpetuated through uncritical repetition in both literature and popular imagination.

== Prehistory ==
=== Tagalog migrations ===
Not much is known about when the Tagalog people came to occupy the lands surrounding Manila Bay, but linguists such as Dr. David Zorc and Dr. Robert Blust speculate that the Tagalogs and other Central Philippine ethno-linguistic groups originated in Northeastern Mindanao or the Eastern Visayas. The Tagalog language is believed to have branched out from a hypothesized "proto-language" which linguists have dubbed "Proto-Philippine language," another branch of which was the Visayan languages.

Some Filipino historians such as Jaime Tiongson have asserted that some of the words used in the Laguna Copperplate Inscription came from Old Tagalog, although the text itself used the Javanese Kawi script.

Like most peoples of Maritime Southeast Asia, the Tagalog people who established the fortified polity of Maynila were Austronesians. They had a rich, complex culture, with its own language and writing, religion, art, and music. This Austronesian culture was already in place before the cultural influences of China, Majapahit, Brunei, and eventually, the foreign conquest. The core elements of this Austronesian culture also persisted despite the introductions of Buddhism, Hinduism, Islam and, later, Christianity. Elements of these belief systems were syncretized by the Tagalogs to enrich their already-existing worldviews, elements of which still persist today in the syncretic forms of folk Catholicism and folk Islam.

These Austronesian cultures are defined by their languages, and by a number of key technologies including the cultural prominence of boats, the construction of thatched houses on piles, the cultivation of tubers and rice, and a characteristic social organization typically led by a “big man” or “man of power”.

== History ==
=== Theories and legends about Maynila (mid-13th century) ===
==== Establishment through defeat of Rajah Avirjirkaya by Rajah Ahmad of Brunei (c. 1258) ====
According to Mariano A. Henson's genealogical research (later brought up by Majul in 1973, and by Santiago in 1990) a settlement in the Maynila area already existed by the year 1258. This settlement was ruled by "Rajah Avirjirkaya" whom Henson described as a "Majapahit Suzerain".

According to Henson, this settlement was attacked by a Bruneian commander named Rajah Ahmad, who defeated Avirjirkaya and established Maynila as a "Muslim principality".

=== Nanhai Zhi annals (1304) ===
The Chinese History Annals, the Nanhai Zhi (South Seas Chronicles) made mentions of polities such as Malilu (麻裏蘆), Mayi (麻逸), Meikun (美昆), Puduan (蒲端), Sulou (苏录), Shahuchong (沙胡重), Yachen (哑陈), Manaluonu (麻拿囉奴) and Wenduling (文杜陵), which were locations said to be ruled by Foni (佛坭). According to Chinese historian Wang Zhenping, the locations mentioned in the chronicle can be attributed to the following modern equivalent places:

- Foni (佛坭) - Brunei
- Malilu (麻裏蘆) - Manila or Polillo
- Mayi (麻逸) - Mindoro
- Meikun (美昆) - Manukan or Camiguin
- Puduan (蒲端) - Butuan
- Sulou (苏录) - Sulu
- Shahuchong (沙胡重) - Siocon or Siaton
- Yachen (哑陈) - Oton
- Manaluonu (麻拿囉奴) - Maranao or the Malanu tribe in Sarawak
- Wenduling (文杜陵) - Mindanao or Bintulu

=== Influence of Brunei (early 16th century) ===
By the start of the 16th century, the Bruneian Empire exerted influence over the western shores of the Philippines.

Maynila, along with Tondo, was a prosperous trading settlement by the 16th century, ruled by Bruneian aristocrats intermarried with the Tagalog elite. The ruling class were fluent in both Malay and Tagalog, and many of the people in Maynila were literate, compared to those of the Visayas. It was because of this relationship that the Tagalog language used in Maynila began absorbing Malay words into their own vocabulary. Somewhere in the early 16th century, the ruler of Maynila, Rajah Salalila or Panguiran Salalila, was married to a daughter of Sultan Bolkiah and princess Puteri Laila Menchanai of Sulu. Apart from ruling over Maynila, Panguiran Salalila was also acknowledged by the chiefs of Mindoro to be their overlord.

==== Maynila as Saludang/Selurong ====
In the 14th century, according to the epic eulogy poem Nagarakretagama, which was dedicated to Maharaja Hayam Wuruk of the Majapahit, a place called "Saludang", also called "Seludong" or "Selurung" was listed in Canto 14 alongside "Sulot" and "Kalka" as its territories.

The idea of Maynila being "Saludang", along with "Sulot" being identified with Sulu, was first mentioned in a book by Cesar A. Majul titled 'Muslims in the Philippines' (1973), stating:

"Brunei Sultan Bulkeiah (Nakhoda Ragam), who "was the Rajah who conquered the kingdom of Soolook and made a dependency of the country of Selurong, the Rajah of which was called DATOH GAMBAN", according to the Brunei Selesilah. Now, according to Brunei tradition, Selurong is said to be "in the island of Luzon and the site of the present town of Manila".

Many other scholars, such as William Henry Scott (1994) and Mohammed Jamil Al-Sufri (2000), acknowledged the theory of Maynila as Selurong/Saludang. Scott noted that "according to Bruneian folk history", [ ] "Manila was probably founded as a Bornean trading colony about 1500, with a royal prince marrying into the local ruling family."

In the original Selesilah however,Datu Imam Aminuddin mentions:

"... and the Sultan begot Sultan Bolkiah, who fought a war with the people of Sulu and defeated the kingdoms of Sulu and Seludang whose ruler was Datu Gamban. Sultan Bolkiah was also named by the elders as 'Nakhoda Ragam'. He married Princess Lela Manjani (Menchanai)."

French linguist Jean-Paul Potet notes that "According to some, Luzon and Manila would have been called Seludong or Selurong by the Malays of Brunei before the Spanish conquest (Cebu 1565, Manila 1571)." However, Potet also points out that "there is no text to support this claim. Conversely, Borneo has a mountain site called Seludong." Saunders (1994) meanwhile suggests that Saludang or Seludang is located on the Serudong River in eastern Sabah.

=== Portuguese presence (1511 – 1540s) ===
During the early 16th century, Portuguese sailors in Malaysia referred to the Tagalog people who lived in Manila Bay ("Lusong", Portuguese: Luçon) using the demonym Luções (Portuguese pronunciation: [luˈsõjʃ], Spanish: Luzones).

Surviving primary documents referring to these Luções include the accounts of Fernão Mendes Pinto (1614); Tomé Pires (whose written documents were published in 1944); and the survivors of Ferdinand Magellan's expedition, including expedition members Gines de Mafra and Rodrigo de Aganduru Moriz and the Italian scholar Antonio Pigafetta who served as the expedition's primary scribe, and published his account in 1524.

The Portuguese first established a presence in Maritime Southeast Asia with their capture of Malacca in 1511, and their contacts with the seafarers they described as Luções (lit. people from "lusong", the area now known as Manila Bay) became the first European accounts of the Tagalog people, as Anthony Reid recounts:

The first European reports on the Tagalogs classify them as "Luzons", a nominally Muslim commercial people trading out of Manila, and "almost one people" with the Malays of Brunei.

The Portuguese chronicler Tome Pires noted that in their own country, the Luções had "foodstuffs, wax, honey, inferior grade gold", had no king, and were governed instead by a group of elders. They traded with tribes from Borneo and Indonesia, and Filipino historians note that the language of the Luções was one of the 80 different languages spoken in Malacca.

As skilled sailors, the Lucoes were actively involved in the political and military/naval affairs of those who sought to take control of the economically strategic highway of the Strait of Malacca, serving in the fleets of the Sultans of Ache and Brunei, and the former Sultan of Malacca, Scholars have suggested that they may have served as highly skilled naval mercenaries sought after by various fleets of the time.

Portuguese and Spanish accounts from the early to mid 1500s state that the Maynila polity was the same as the "kingdom" (Note: Scott (1994) notes that Spanish chroniclers continued to use the terms "king" and "kingdom" to describe the polities of Tondo and Maynila until late 1571, when Martin de Goiti's first forays into Bulacan and Pampanga clarified to the Spanish that the alliances of the Tondo and Maynila polities with the Kapampangan polities did not include territorial claim or absolute command. San Buenaventura (1613, as cited by Junker, 1990 and Scott, 1994) later noted that Tagalogs only applied the term Hari (King) to foreign monarchs, rather than their own leaders.) that had been referred to as the "Kingdom of Luzon" (Portuguese: Luçon, locally called "Lusong"), and whose residents had been called "Luções".

However, Kapampangan scholars such as Ian Christopher Alfonso add that it is also possible that while the Portuguese and Spanish chroniclers specifically equated "Luçon" with Rajah Matanda's Maynila polity, the description may have been expansive enough to describe other polities in the Manila bay area, including Tondo as well as the Kapampangans of Hagonoy and Macabebe.

=== Territorial conflicts with Tondo (before 1521) ===
According to the account of Rajah Matanda as recalled by Magellan expedition members Gines de Mafra, Rodrigo de Aganduru Moriz, and expedition scribe Antonio Pigafetta, Rajah Matanda's father (whose name was not mentioned in the accounts) died when he was still very young. Rajah Matanda's mother (also unnamed in the Spanish accounts) then became the paramount ruler of the Maynila polity. In the meantime, Rajah Matanda, then simply known as the "Young Prince" Ache, was raised alongside his cousin, who was ruler of Tondo, although not specifically named in the Spanish accounts.

During this time, Ache realized that his cousin, who was ruler of Tondo, was "slyly", taking advantage of Ache's mother, by taking over territory belonging to Maynila. When Ache asked his mother for permission to address the matter, his mother refused, encouraging the young prince to keep his peace instead. Prince Ache could not accept this and thus left Maynila with some of his father's trusted men, to go to his "grandfather", the Sultan of Brunei, to ask for assistance. The Sultan responded by giving Ache a position as commander of his naval force.

Pigaffetta noted that Ache was "much feared in these parts", but especially the non-Muslim locals, who considered the Sultan of Brunei an enemy.

=== Capture of Prince Ache by the Elcano expedition (1521) ===
In 1521, Ache was coming fresh from a military victory at the helm of the Bruneian navy as he just razed the Buddhist city of Laoue in Southwest Borneo to the ground, under orders from his grandfather, the Bruneian Sultan, and was supposedly on his way to Maynila with the intent of confronting his cousin when he came upon and attacked the remnants of the Magellan expedition, then under the command of Sebastian Elcano. Some historians suggest that Ache's decision to attack must have been influenced by a desire to expand his fleet even further as he made his way back to Lusong and Maynila, where he could use the size of his fleet as leverage against his cousin, the ruler of Tondo.

Ache was eventually released, supposedly after the payment of a large ransom. One of Ache's slaves, who was not included in the ransom payment, then became a translator for the Elcano expedition.

=== Spanish advent (1570s) ===
In the mid-16th century, the areas of present-day Manila were governed by native rajahs. Rajah Matanda (whose real name was recorded by the Legaspi expedition as Ache) and his nephew, Rajah Sulayman "Rajah Mura" or "Rajah Muda" (a Sanskrit title for a Prince), ruled the Muslim communities south of the Pasig River, including Maynila while Lakandula ruled non-Muslim Tondo north of the river. These settlements held ties with the sultanates of Brunei, Sulu, and Ternate, Indonesia (not to be confused with Ternate in present-day Cavite). Maynila was centered on a fortress (kota) along the Pasig delta. When the Spanish came and invaded Manila they described the bayan as a settlement with a fortress of rammed earth with stockades lined with cannons (lantaka) between battlements. The cannons were locally manufactured and forged by Panday Piray. When the Spanish invaded and burned the kota to the ground, they built up the Christian walled city of Intramuros on the ruins of Islamic Manila.

== Government and politics ==
=== Governmental structure ===
==== Maynila as a "kingdom" ====
In popular literature and in history texts from the first few decades after Philippine independence, precolonial Maynila is often referred to as the "Kingdom of Maynila", and its Rajas portrayed as "kings", even if they did not exercise sovereignty in the technical sense of achieving a "monopoly on the legitimate use of force". Instead, limited population sizes, the ready availability of land, and seasonally migratory agricultural practices meant that their authority was based on interpersonal loyalty structures and social obligations vis a vis clearly defined territorial dominion.

==== Maynila as the Kingdom of Luzon ====
Detail of an illustration from Jean Mallat's 1846 book "The Philippines: history, geography, customs, agriculture, industry, and commerce of the Spanish colonies in Oceania", showing "a Tagalog couple pounding rice." The mortar depicted is known as a lusong, a large, cylindrical, deep-mouthed wooden mortal used to de-husk rice. Linguist Jean Paul Potet explains that the Old Tagalog name of the Pasig River delta, in which Tondo was located, was derived from this mortar.

Portuguese and Spanish records in the 1500s state that Maynila was the same as the kingdom that was referred to as the Kingdom of Luzon (Portuguese: Luçon, possibly from the name "Lusong"), and whose citizens had been called "Luções".

Magellan expedition member Rodrigo de Aganduru Moriz's account of the events of 1521 specifically describes how the Magellan expedition, then under the command of Sebastian Elcano after the death of Magellan, captured of one of the Luções: Prince Ache, who would later be known as Rajah Matanda, who was then serving as a commander of the Naval forces of Brunei. Aganduru Moriz described the "young prince" as being "the Prince of Luzon - or Manila, which is the same.” corroborated by fellow expedition member Gines de Mafra and the account of expedition scribe Antonio Pigaffetta.

This description of Ache as "King of Luzon" was further confirmed by the Visayan allies of Miguel Lopez de Legaspi, who, learning that he wanted to "befriend" the ruler of Luzon, led him to write a letter to Ache, whom he addressed as the "King of Luzon".

Kapampangan researcher Ian Christopher Alfonso, however, notes that the demonym Luções was probably expansive enough to include even Kapampangan sailors, such as the sailors from Hagonoy and Macabebe who would later be involved in the 1571 Battle of Bangkusay Channel.

The name Luzon, which French linguist Jean-Paul Potet explains was the name given to the Pasig River delta area, is thought to derive from the Tagalog word lusong, which is a large wooden mortar used in dehusking rice. A 2008 PIDS research paper by Eulito Bautista and Evelyn Javier provides an image of a Lusong, and explains that,

"Traditional milling was accomplished in the 1900s by pounding the palay with a wooden pestle in a stone or wooden mortar called lusong. The first pounding takes off the hull and further pounding removes the bran but also breaks most grains. Further winnowing with a bamboo tray (bilao) separates the hull from the rice grains. This traditional hand-pounding chore, although very laborious and resulted in a lot of broken rice, required two to three skilled men and women to work harmoniously and was actually a form of socializing among young folks in the villages."

==== Maynila as a bayan ====
According to the earliest Tagalog dictionaries, large coastal settlements like Tondo and Maynila, which were ultimately led by a lakan or rajah, were called bayan in the Tagalog language. This term (which is translated today as "town") was common among the various languages of the Philippine archipelago, and eventually came to refer to the entire Philippines, alongside the word bansa (or bangsa, meaning "nation").

=== Class structure ===
The precolonial Tagalog barangays of Manila, Pampanga and Laguna had a more complex social structure than the Visayans (except for lowland Panay), directly participating in commerce elsewhere with the rest of Southeast and East Asia through their Bornean political contacts and proximity to the South China Sea tradewinds, and engaging in widespread wet rice agriculture provided by the tropical savanna landscape. The Tagalogs were thus described by the Spanish Augustinian friar Martin de Rada as more traders than warriors.

In his seminal 1994 work "Barangay: Sixteenth Century Philippine Culture and Society" (further simplified in the briefer by the Presidential Communications Development and Strategic Planning Office in 2015), historian William Henry Scott delineates the three classes of Tagalog society during the 1500s:

- the maginoo (ruling class), which included the Lakan or Rajah and the Datus under him;
- A class described as "Freemen" consisting of timawa and maharlika; and
- Alipin (slaves), which could further be subcategorized as aliping namamahay or alipin sa gigilid.

==== Leadership and governance ====
One of the most cosmopolitan of the early historic settlements on the Philippine archipelago, Maynila was led by paramount rulers who were referred to using the Malay title of "Raja," which is in turn derived from the Sanskrit language. In popular literature, Maynila is often referred to as a "kingdom", and its Rajas as "kings", even if they did not exercise sovereignty in the technical sense of achieving a "monopoly on the legitimate use of force".

Because population density throughout the archipelago was very low and agricultural practices involved regularly changing planting locations every season and year to maximize the fertility value of the soil, rulership was based on interpersonal loyalty structures and social obligations rather than clearly defined territorial dominion.

These leaders buttressed their right to rule by gaining prestige, notably by establishing trade and family relations with other regional powers. This was manifested in these leaders taking on foreign symbols of prestige such as the Sanskrit title raja and nominally claiming Islamic beliefs, although early chroniclers noted that the population at large did not seem to hold on to Islamic beliefs and practices and continued, for example, to retain pork as an important part of their diet.

== Foreign relations ==
=== Ming dynasty ===
Theories such as Wilhelm Solheim's Nusantao Maritime Trading and Communication Network (NMTCN) suggest that cultural links between what are now China and the nations of Southeast Asia, including what is now the Philippines, date back to the peopling of these lands. But the earliest archeological evidence of trade between the Philippine aborigines and China takes the form of pottery and porcelain pieces dated to the Tang and Song dynasties.

The rise of the Ming dynasty saw the arrival of the first Chinese settlers in the archipelago. They were well received and lived together in harmony with the existing local population — eventually intermarrying with them so that today, numerous Filipinos have Chinese blood in their veins. Also a lot of Philippine cultural mores today came from China more so than their later colonizers of Spain and the United States.

This connection was important enough that when the Ming dynasty emperors enforced the Hai jin laws which closed China to maritime trade from 1371 to about 1567, trade with Luzon was officially allowed to continue, masqueraded as a tribute system, through the seaport at Fuzhou. Aside from this, a more extensive clandestine trade from Guangzhou and Quanzhou also brought in Chinese goods to Luzon.

Luzon thus became a center from which Chinese goods were traded all across Southeast Asia. Chinese trade was so strict that Luzon traders carrying these goods were considered "Chinese" by the people they encountered.

=== Japan ===
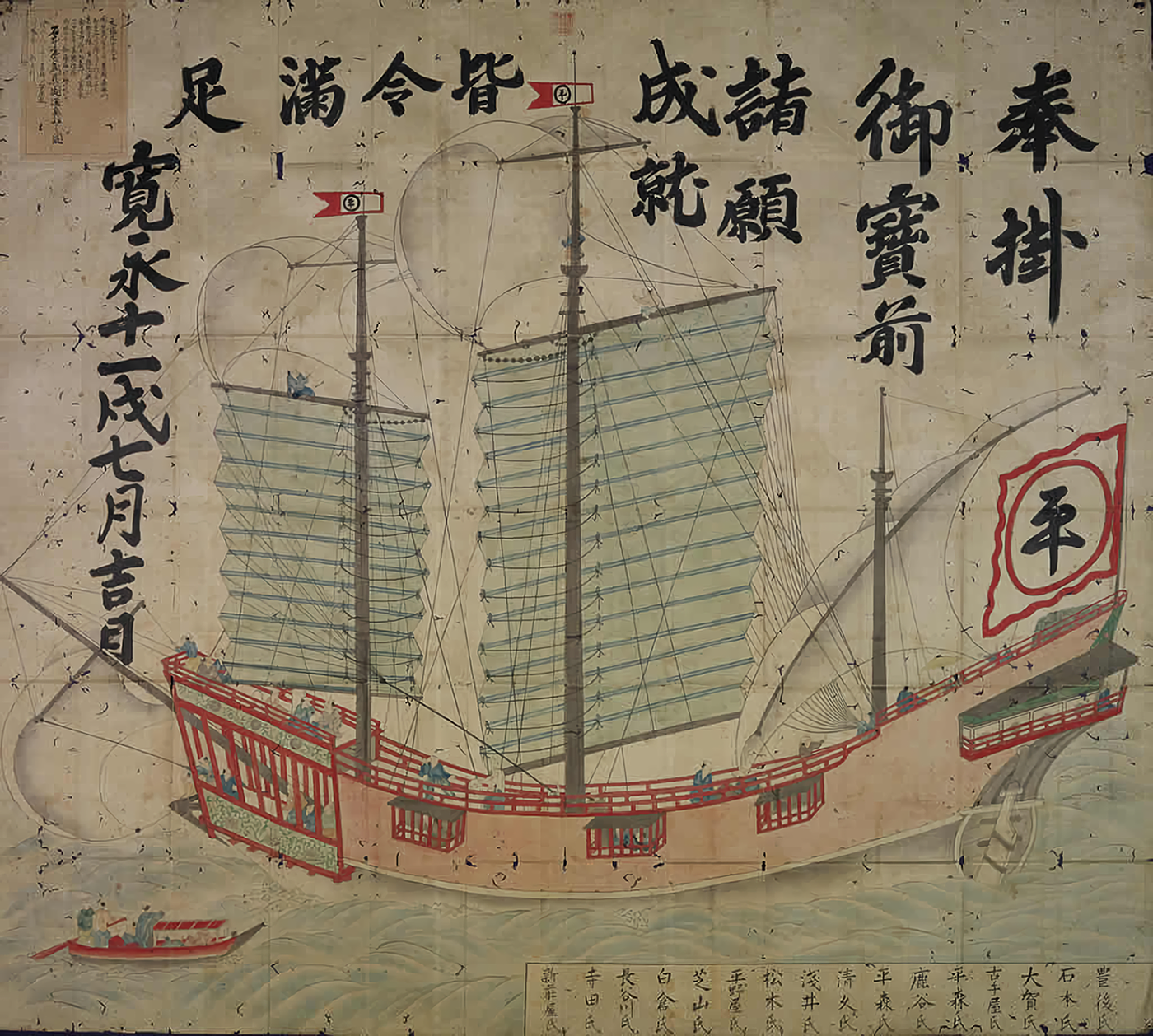
A Japanese Red seal ship. Tokyo Naval Science Museum.

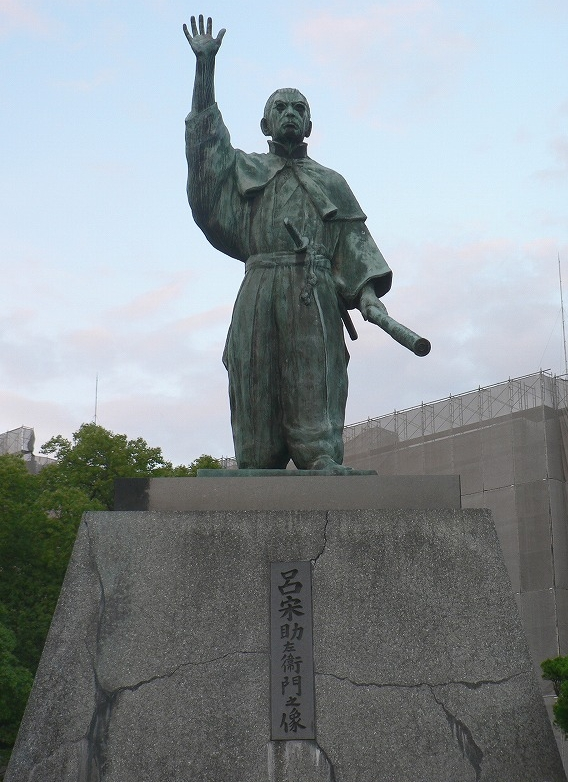
Statue of Luzon Sukezaemon at Sakai Citizens' Hall.

Relations between Japan and the kingdoms in the Philippines, date back to at least the Muromachi period of Japanese history, as Japanese merchants and traders had settled in Luzon at this time. Especially in the area of Dilao, a suburb of Manila, was a Nihonmachi of 3,000 Japanese around the year 1600. The term probably originated from the Tagalog term dilaw, meaning "yellow", which describes a colour. The Japanese had established quite early an enclave at Dilao where they numbered between 300 and 400 in 1593. In 1603, during the Sangley rebellion, they numbered 1,500, and 3,000 in 1606. In the 16th and 17th centuries, thousands of Japanese people traders also migrated to the Philippines and assimilated into the local population.

Japan was only allowed to trade once every 10 years. Japanese merchants often used piracy in order to obtain much sought after Chinese products such as silk and porcelain. Famous 16th-century Japanese merchants and tea connoisseurs like Shimai Soushitsu (島井宗室) and Kamiya Soutan (神屋宗湛) established branch offices on the island of Luzon. One famous Japanese merchant, Luzon Sukezaemon (呂宋助左衛門), went as far as to change his surname from Naya (納屋) to Luzon (呂宋).

== Culture and society ==
=== Clothing and accoutrements ===
Early Spanish accounts describe the Tagalogs as using local plants to dye their cotton clothing. This included tayum or tagum, which produced a blue dye, and dilao, which produced a yellow dye.

Unlike the Bicolanos and Visayans to the east and south and the peoples of the northern Luzon highlands, the Tagalogs did not practice tattooing. In fact, Rajah Sulayman used tattooedness as a pejorative description when the Spanish forces first met him; Sulayman said that Tagalogs were unlike the "painted" Visayans, and thus would not allow themselves to be taken advantage of as easily.

=== Religion ===
Historical accounts, supported by archeological and linguistic evidence and corroborated by anthropological studies, show that the Tagalog people, including those in Tondo and Maynila, practiced a set of Austronesian beliefs and practices which date back to the arrival of Austronesian peoples, although various elements were later syncretized from Hinduism, Mahayana Buddhism, and Islam.

The Tagalogs did not have a specific name for this set of religious beliefs and practices, although later scholars and popular writers refer to it as Anitism, or, less accurately, using the general term animism.

==== Coexistence with and syncretistic adaptation from other beliefs ====
One specific exception to the predominance of Anitism in early Tondo and Maynila was that the apex-level leaders of these polities identified themselves as Muslims, as did the migrant sailor Luzones who were encountered by early 15th century chroniclers in Portuguese Malacca. However, the various ethnographic reports of the period indicate that this seemed to only be a nominal identification ("Muslim by name") because there was only a surface level acknowledgement of Muslim norms (avoidance of pork, non-consumption of blood, etc.) without an "understanding of Mohammedan teachings." Scholars generally believe that this nominal practice of Islam actually represented the early stages of Islamization, which would have seen a much more extensive practice of Muslim beliefs had the Spanish not arrived and introduced their brand of Iberian Catholicism.

Osborne (2004) describes a similar process of "adaptation" happening in connection with Hindu and Buddhist influences in the various cultures of Maritime Southeast Asia, and emphasizes that this "indianization" of Southeast Asia did not per-se overwrite existing indigenous patterns, cultures, and beliefs:

"Because Indian culture “came” to Southeast Asia, one must not think that Southeast Asians lacked a culture of their own. Indeed, the generally accepted view is that Indian culture made such an impact on Southeast Asia because it fitted easily with the existing cultural patterns and religious beliefs of populations that had already moved a considerable distance along the path of civilization.[...] Southeast Asians, to summarize the point, borrowed but they also adapted. In some very important cases, they did not need to borrow at all."

==== Tagalog religious cosmology ====
The Tagalog belief system was more or less anchored on the idea that the world is inhabited by spirits and supernatural entities, both good and bad, and that respect must be accorded to them through worship.

According to the early Spanish missionary-ethnographers, the Tagalog people believed in a creator-god named Bathala, whom they referred to both as maylicha (creator; lit. "actor of creation") and maycapal (lord, or almighty; lit. "actor of power"). Loarca and Chirino also report that in some places, they were "Molayri" (Molaiari) or "Diwata" (Dioata)."

However, these early missionary-ethnographers also noted that the Tagalogs did not include Bathala in their daily acts of worship (pagaanito). Buenaventura was informed that this was because the Tagalogs believed Bathala was too mighty and distant to be bothered with the concerns of mortal man, and so the Tagalogs focused their acts of appeasement to "lesser" deities and powers, immediate spirits which they believed had control over their day-to-day life.

Because the Tagalogs did not have a collective word to describe all these spirits together, Spanish missionaries eventually decided to call them "anito", since they were the subject of the Tagalog's act of pagaanito (worship). According to Scott, accounts and early dictionaries describe them as intermediaries ("Bathala's agents"), and the dictionaries "used the word abogado (advocate) when defining their realms." These sources also show, however, that in practice, they were addressed directly: "in actual prayers, they were petitioned directly, not as intermediaries." Modern day writers divide these spirits broadly into the categories of "Ancestor spirits, nature spirits, and guardian spirits," although they also note that the dividing line between these categories is often blurred.

Demetrio, Cordero-Fernando, and Nakpil Zialcita observe that the Luzon Tagalogs and Kapampangans' use of the word anito, instead of the word diwata which was more predominant in the Visayan regions, indicated that these peoples of Luzon were less influenced by the Hindu-Buddhist beliefs of the Majapahit Empire than the Visayans were. They also observed that the words were used alternately amongst the peoples in the southernmost portions of Luzon - the Bicol Region, Marinduque, Mindoro, etc. They suggested that this have represented transitional area, the front lines of an increased "Indianized" Majapahit influence which was making its way north the same way Islam was making its way north from Mindanao.

== Foreign cultural influences ==
=== Trade and cultural influences from China, India, and Maritime Southeast Asia ===
The early inhabitants of present-day Manila engaged in trade relations with its Asian neighbours as well as with the Hindu empires of Java and Sumatra, as confirmed by archaeological findings. Trade ties with China became extensive by the 10th century, while contact with Arab merchants reached its peak in the 12th century.

=== Beginnings of Islamization in Luzon (1175 – 1500s) ===
Archeological findings provide evidence that followers of Islam had reached the Pasig River area by 1175; among the graves found on the Santa Ana burial site were a number of Muslim burials.

Islamization was a slow process which occurred with the steady conversion of the citizenry of Tondo and Manila created Muslim domains. The Bruneians installed the Muslim rajahs, Rajah Salalila and Rajah Matanda in the south (now the Intramuros district) and the Buddhist-Hindu settlement was ruled under Lakandula in Tundun (now Tondo). Islamization of Luzon began in the sixteenth century when traders from Brunei settled in the Manila area and married locals while maintaining kinship and trade links with Brunei and thus other Muslim centres in Southeast Asia. The Muslims were called "Moros" by the Spanish who assumed they occupied the whole coast. Islam had become a major political or religious force in the region.

== Economy ==
Historians widely agree that the larger coastal polities which flourished throughout the Philippine archipelago in the period immediately prior to the arrival of the Spanish colonizers (including Tondo and Maynila) were "organizationally complex", demonstrating both economic specialization and a level of social stratification which would have led to a local demand for "prestige goods".

Specialized industries in the Tagalog and Kapampangan regions, including Tondo and Maynila, included agriculture, textile weaving, basketry, metallurgy, carpentry, hunting, among others. The social stratification which gave birth to the maginoo class created a demand for prestige products including ceramics, silk textiles, and precious stones. This demand, in turn, served as the impetus for both internal and external trade. Technology in the Kingdom of Manila was so advanced there were already forges used in cannons and hand-guns making, the cannons and hand guns being locally known as Lantakas. In contrast, while the Filipinos were already using gunpowder weapons, the more famous people of the Shogunate of Japan were still using Samurai swords and bow and arrows.

Junker notes that significant work still needs to be done in analyzing the internal/local supply and demand dynamics in pre-Spanish era polities, because much of the prior research has tended to focus on their external trading activities. Scott notes that early Spanish lexicons are particularly useful for this analysis, because these early dictionaries captured many words which demonstrate the varied nuances of these local economic activities.

=== Trade ===
Junker describes coastal polities of Tondo and Maynila's size as "administrative and commercial centers functioning as important nodes in networks of external and internal trade". While the basic model for the movement of trade goods in early Philippine history saw coastal settlements at the mouth of large rivers (in this case, the Pasig river delta) controlling the flow of goods to and from settlements further upriver (in this case, the upland lakeside barangays of Laguna de Bay), Tondo and Maynila had trade arrangements which allowed them to control trade throughout the rest of the archipelago. Scott observes that while the port of Tondo had the monopoly on arriving Chinese merchant ships, it was Maynila's fleet of trading vessels which in turn retailed them to settlements throughout the rest of the archipelago, so much so that Maynila's vessels, alongside Bornean, came to be known as "Chinese" (sinina).

==== Redistribution of Chinese and Japanese goods ====
The most lucrative of Tondo's economic activities involved the redistribution of Chinese goods, which would arrive in Manila bay through Tondo's port and be distributed throughout the rest of the archipelago, mostly through Maynila's extensive shipping activities.

The Chinese and Japanese migrations to Malaya and the Philippines shore began in the 7th century and reached their peak after 1644 owing to the Manchu conquest of China. These Chinese and Japanese immigrants settled in Manila, Pasig included, and in the other ports, which were annually visited by their trade junks, they had cargoes of silk, tea, ceramics, and their precious jade stones.

According to William Henry Scott (1982), when ships from China and Japan came to Manila bay, Lakandula would remove the sails and rudders of their ships until they paid him duties and anchorage fees, and then he would then buy up all their goods himself, paying half its value immediately and then paying the other half upon their return the following year. In the interim, these goods would be traded throughout the rest of the archipelago. The result was that other locals were not able to buy anything from the Chinese and Japanese directly, but from Tondo and Maynila, who made a tidy profit as a result.

Augustinian Fray Martin de Rada Legaspi says that the Tagalogs were "more traders than warriors", and Scott notes in a later book (1994) that Maynila's ships got their goods from Tondo and then dominated trade through the rest of the archipelago. People in other parts of the archipelago often referred to Maynila's boats as "Chinese" or "Japanese' (Sina or Sinina) because they came bearing Chinese and Japanese goods.

=== Agriculture ===
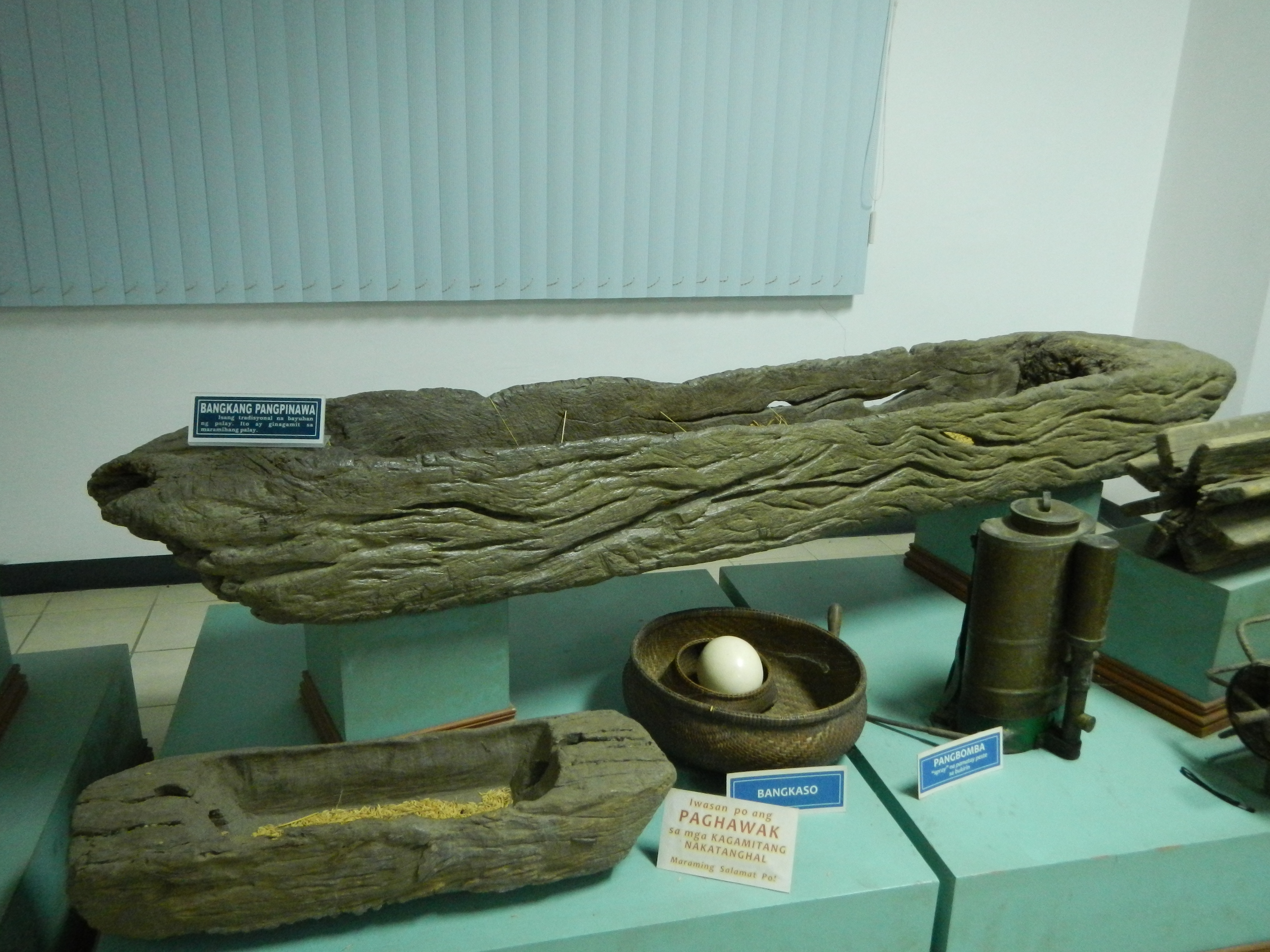
Bangkang Pinawa, ancient Philippine mortar and pestle.

The people of Luzon engaged in agriculture. A report during the time of Miguel López de Legazpi noted of the great abundance of rice, fowls, wine as well as great numbers of carabaos, deer, wild boar and goat husbandry in Luzon. In addition, there were also great quantities of cotton and colored clothes, wax, wine, honey and date palms produced by the native peoples, rice, cotton, swine, fowls, wax and honey abound.

==== Crop production ====
Rice was the staple food of the Tagalogs and Kapampangans, and its ready availability in Luzon despite variations in annual rainfall was one of the reasons Legaspi wanted to locate his colonial headquarters on Manila bay. Scott's study of early Tagalog lexicons revealed that the Tagalogs had words for at least 22 different varieties of rice.

In most other places in the archipelago, rootcrops served as an alternate staple in seasons when rice was not readily available. These were also available in Luzon, but they were desired more as vegetables, rather than as a staple. Ubi, tugi, gabi and a local root crop which the Spanish called kamoti (apparently not the same as the sweet potato, sweet potato, Ipomoea batatas) were farmed in swiddens, while "laksa" and "nami" grew wild. Sweet potatoes (now called camote) were later introduced by the Spanish.

Millet was common enough that the Tagalogs had a word which meant "milletlike": "dawa-dawa".

== Notable rulers of Maynila ==
=== Historical rulers of Maynila ===
A number of rulers of Maynila are specifically identified in historical documents, which include:

- the epistolary firsthand accounts of the members of the Magellan and Legaspi expeditions, referred to in Spanish as "relaciones"; These include the Sulu and Maguindanao tarsilas, and the Batu Tarsila of Brunei.
- various notarized genealogical records kept by the early Spanish colonial government, mostly in the form of last wills and testaments of descendants of said rulers

Title	Name	Description	Dates	Primary source(s)	Academic reception of primary source(s)
Rajah	Salalila	Sometimes referred to as "Rajah (Si) Lela", and sometimes as "Rajah Sulaiman I", paramount ruler of Maynila.	c. late 1400s to early 1500s (died earlier than 1521)	Identified as "Salalila" in Spanish genealogical documents	The veracity of claimed links to legendary figures in genealogical documents are subject to scholarly peer review. Key scholarly works referencing Salalila include Henson (1955), Majul (1973), Luciano PR Santiago (1990), W.H. Scott (1994), and Dery (2001).
"Queen"^{^{[†]}}	Name Unknown (Mother of Rajah Ache)	Served as paramount ruler of Maynila after the death of her husband; her period of reign covered the youth of Rajah Matanda, including the time Ache spent as commander of the Bruneian navy.	c. late 1400s to early 1500s (reigned c. 1521)	Identified as the mother of Prince Ache in the accounts of Magellan expedition members Rodrigo de Aganduru Moriz, Gines de Mafra, and Antonio Pigafetta	Firsthand accounts generally accepted by Philippine historiographers, although with corrections for hispanocentric bias subject to scholarly peer review. The veracity of "quasi-historical" (meaning not physically original) genealogical documents also remains subject to scholarly peer review.
Rajah	Ache (Matanda)	Shared the role of paramount ruler of Maynila with Rajah Sulayman, as of the Spanish advent in the early 1570s.	(b.) before 1521 – (d.) August 1572	Multiple firsthand accounts from the Magellan (1521) and Legaspi Expeditions (late 1560s to early 1570s); Spanish genealogical documents	Firsthand accounts generally accepted by Philippine historiographers, although with corrections for hispanocentric bias subject to scholarly peer review. The veracity of claimed links to legendary figures in genealogical documents are subject to scholarly peer review.
Rajah	Sulayman	Shared the role of paramount ruler of Maynila with Rajah Matanda, as of the Spanish advent in the early 1570s.	c. 1571	Multiple accounts from the Legaspi Expedition (early 1570s); Spanish genealogical documents	Firsthand accounts generally accepted by Philippine historiographers, although with corrections for hispanocentric bias subject to scholarly peer review. The veracity of claimed links to legendary figures in genealogical documents are subject to scholarly peer review.

^{[†]} Term used by original Hispanocentric text); the exact local term used by the individual was not recorded in the historical account.

=== Legendary rulers ===
A number of rulers of Maynila are known only through oral histories, which in turn have been recorded by various documentary sources, ranging from historical documents describing oral histories, to contemporary descriptions of modern (post-colonial/national-era) oral accounts. These include:

- orally transmitted genealogical traditions, such as the Batu Tarsila, which have since been recorded and cited by scholarly accounts;
- legends and folk traditions documented by anthropologists, local government units, the National Historical Institute of the Philippines, and other official sources; and
- recently published genealogical accounts based on contemporary research.

Academic acceptance of the details recounted in these accounts vary from case to case, and are subject to scholarly peer review.

title	Name	Description	Dates	Primary source(/s)	Academic notes on primary source(/s)
Rajah	Avirjirkaya	According to Henson (1955), he was a "Majapahit Suzerain" who ruled Maynila before he was defeated in 1258* by a Bruneian naval commander named Rajah Ahmad, who then established Manila as a Muslim principality. *probably actually in the 15th century when Brunei was already Muslim and Majapahit still prominent. Majapahit did not exist yet in 1258 (it was still Singhasari) and Brunei was not yet Muslim in 1258.	before 1258	Genealogy proposed by Mariano A. Henson in 1955	Cited in César Adib Majul's 1973 book "Muslims in the Philippines", published by the UP Asian Center and in turn referenced widely in semitechnical and popular texts. The veracity of "quasi-historical" (meaning not physically original) genealogical documents remains subject to scholarly peer review.
Rajah	Ahmad	According to Henson (1955), he established Manila as a Muslim principality in 1258 by defeating the Majapahit Suzerain Rajah Avirjirkaya.	c. 1258	Genealogy proposed by Mariano A. Henson in 1955	Cited in César Adib Majul's 1973 book "Muslims in the Philippines", published by the UP Asian Center and in turn referenced widely in semi-technical and popular texts. The veracity of "quasi-historical" (meaning not physically original) genealogical documents remains subject to scholarly peer review.

== See also ==
- Luções
- Rajah Sulayman
- Battle of Bangkusay Channel
- History of Manila
- List of Sunni Muslim dynasties
- History of the Philippines (Before 1521)
- Hinduism in the Philippines
- Namayan
- Cainta (historical polity)
- Tondo (historical polity)
