= Historiography of early Philippine settlements =

The historiography of early Philippine settlements is the academic discipline concerned with the studies, sources, critical methods and interpretations used by scholars to understand the history of settlements in early Philippine history. By modern definitions, this does not involve a story of "events in the past directly," but rather "the changing interpretations of those events in the works of individual historians."

The study of early Philippine settlements is often hampered by the fact that the modern political entity known as the Philippines did not actually exist prior to the arrival of Spanish colonial powers in the late sixteenth century. It is thus important to note that the historiography of early Philippine settlements concerns the writing of the histories of settlements which were not united as one state, but which happened to be located on what is now called the Philippine archipelago.

== Comprehensive Reviews of Primary Sources ==
All a few comprehensive reviews of source materials for the study of Philippine prehistory and early history have been done, with William Henry Scott's 1968 review being one of the earliest systematic critiques. Scott's review has become a seminal academic work on the study of early Philippine history, having been reviewed early on by a panel of that era's most eminent historians and folklorists including Teodoro Agoncillo, Horacio de la Costa, Marcelino Foronda, Mercedes Grau Santamaria, Nicholas Zafra and Gregorio Zaide. Scott's 1968 review was acknowledged by Laura Lee Junker when she conducted her own comprehensive 1998 review of primary sources regarding archaic Philippine polities, and by F. Landa Jocano in his Anthropological analysis of Philippine Prehistory.

Scott lists the sources for the study of Philippine prehistory as: archaeology, linguistics and paleogeography, foreign written documents, and quasi-historical genealogical documents. In a later work, he conducts a detailed critique of early written documents and surviving oral or folk traditions connected with the Philippines early historic or protohistoric era.

Sources Junker considers particularly relevant to the study of early Philippine settlements include:

- "Malay texts,"
- "Philippine oral traditions,"
- "Chinese tributary records and geographies,"
- "early Spanish writings," and
- "archaeological evidence."

== Key figures in the Historiography of early Philippine settlements ==
This section provides an incomplete list of key figures in the historiography of early Philippine settlements, including: early chroniclers from before and immediately after Spanish contact; historians from the Spanish colonial era; "modernist" and "nationalist" historians from the 20th century; and finally contemporary-era critical historians and historiographers.

=== Early Chroniclers ===
- Antonio Pigafetta
- Antonio de Morga
- Rodrigo de Aganduru Moriz
- Hernando de Riquel
- Miguel López de Legazpi
- Juan de Plasencia
- Pedro de San Buenaventura
- Pedro Chirino

=== Colonial Era Historians ===
- Francisco Ignacio Alcina
- Francisco Colin, S.J.
- Felix Huerta, O.F.M
- Isabelo de los Reyes
- Pedro Paterno
- Jose Rizal
- Ferdinand Blumentritt
- Emma Helen Blair and James A. Robertson

=== Writers and Historians from the Nationalist History tradition ===
- Teodoro Agoncillo
- Horacio de la Costa
- Gregorio Zaide
- O.D. Corpuz
- Cesar Adib Majul
- Nick Joaquin

=== Historians from the Critical Historiography tradition ===
- Carlos Quirino
- F. Landa Jocano
- Felix M. Keesing
- William Henry Scott
- Laura Lee Junker
- Damon L. Woods

=== Writers from the Folkloristics tradition ===
- Damiana Eugenio
- Gilda Cordero-Fernando
- Grace Odal-Devora

=== Historians and Writers from the Postmodern, Local/Ethnic History, and Religious History traditions ===
- Ambeth Ocampo
- Bambi Harper
- Melba Padilla Maggay
- Vicente L. Rafael
- Go Bon Juan
- Luciano P.R. Santiago
- Luis Camara Dery
- Marcelino A. Foronda, Jr.
- Juan A. Foronda
- Ian Christopher Alfonso
- Zeus A. Salazar

== See also ==
- History of the Philippines (900—1565)
- Paramount rulers in early Philippine history
