= Battle of Manila (1570) =

Military engagement between the Spanish Empire and the Kingdom of Maynila

Coordinates: 14°35′N 120°58′E

Siege of Manila
- Part of the Spanish conquests in Asia
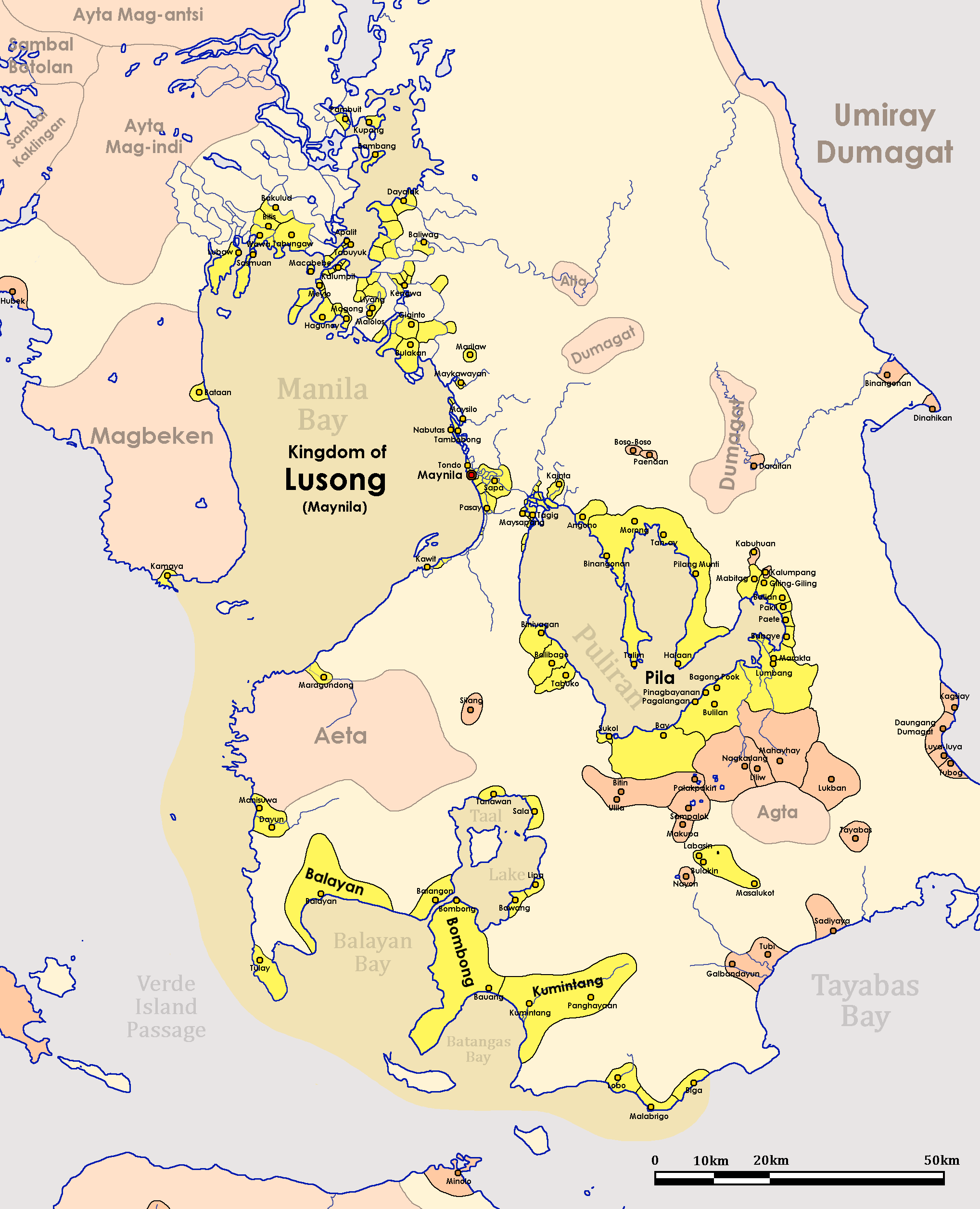
- Map of the Kingdom of Luzon before the Spanish capture of the city.
| Date | May 24, 1570 |
| Location | Manila, Kingdom of Luzon |
| Result | Spanish victory |
| Territorial changes | The city of Manila sacked and burned |

Belligerents
| Kingdom of Spain: (Spain) Spanish East Indies | Kingdom of Luzon |

Commanders and leaders
| (Spain) Martin de Goiti | Sulayman III |

The 1570 Battle of Manila (Filipino: Labanan sa Maynila; Spanish: Batalla de Manila) was fought in Manila between the local forces led by Rajah Sulayman and the Spaniards led by Field Marshal Martin de Goiti, on 24 May 1570. Goiti's forces eventually besieged the fort of Manila, destroyed Manila, and won the battle, with the site of the fort falling to the Kingdom of the Spains and the Indies. The Spaniards then founded a Spanish city of Manila making it the capital of the Spanish East Indies.

== Events ==
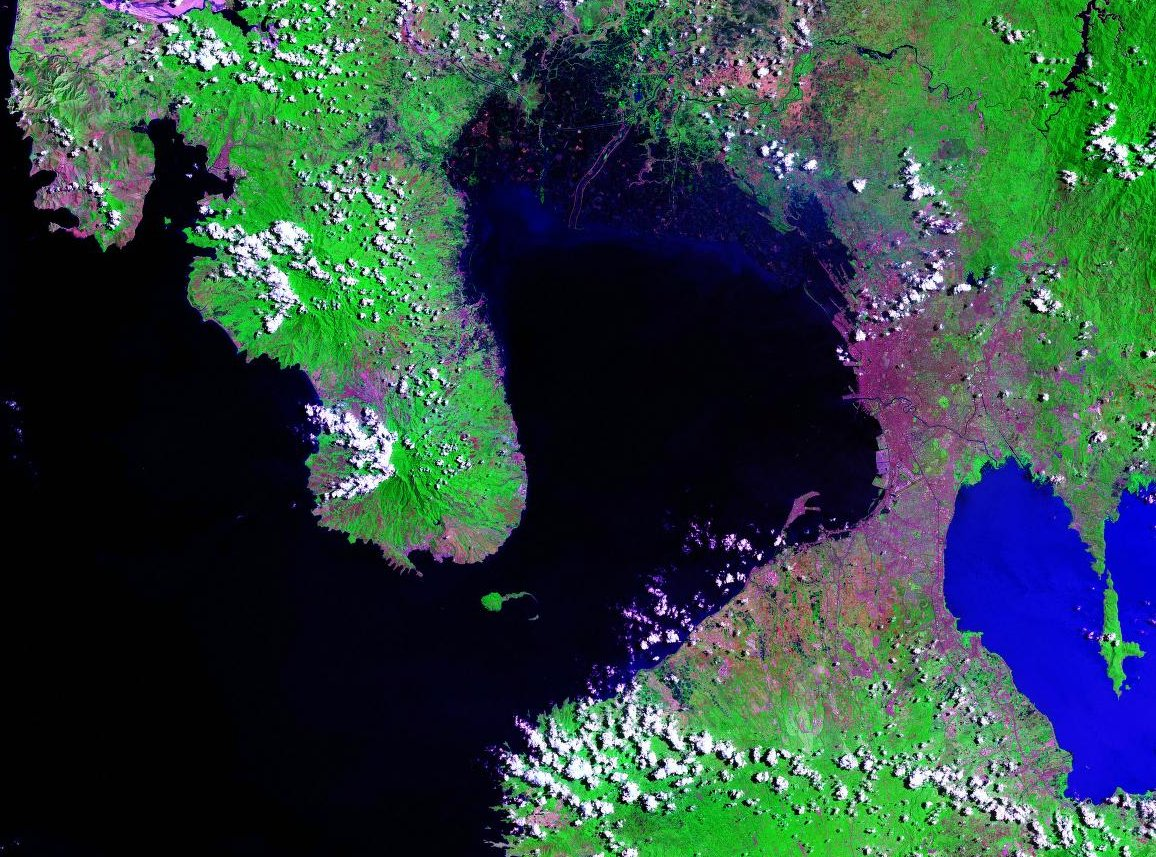
A modern-day satellite image of Manila Bay, showing the locations of Cavite and the Pasig River delta, including Intramuros, the site of the capital of the Kingdom of Luzon.

By the late 1560s, Miguel López de Legazpi who had left Mexico with a retinue of Spanish and Mexican soldiers, was already searching for a more suitable place to establish the Spanish colonial capital, having found first Cebu and then Iloilo undesirable because of insufficient food supplies and attacks by Portuguese pirates. He was in Cebu when he first heard about a well-supplied, fortified settlement to the north, and sent messages of friendship to its ruler, Rajah Matanda, whom he addressed as "King of Luzon." In 1570, Legazpi put Martin de Goiti in command of an expedition north to Manila and tasked him with negotiating the establishment of a Spanish fort there.

De Goiti arrived in May 1570, anchored at Cavite on the mouth of Manila Bay. He was initially well received by Maynila's ruler Rajah Matanda, who, as former commander of the naval forces of the Sultanate of Brunei, had already had dealings with the Magellan expedition in late 1521. Negotiations broke down, however, when another ruler, Rajah Sulayman, arrived and began treating the Spanish belligerently, saying that the Tagalog people would not submit to Spanish sovereignty. The accounts of the de Goiti mission report that Tondo's ruler, Lakandula, sought to participate in these negotiations early on, but de Goiti intentionally ignored Lakandula because he wanted to focus on Maynila, which Legazpi wanted to use as a headquarters because it was already fortified, whereas Tondo was not.

By May 24, negotiations had broken down, and according to the Spanish accounts, their ships fired their cannon as a signal for the expedition boats to return. Whether or not this claim was true, the rulers of Maynila perceived this to be an attack and as a result, Sulayman ordered an attack on the Spanish forces still within the city. The battle was very brief. The Spanish Conquistadors together with their regiment of thousands of newly converted native warriors from the Visayas proved to be too overwhelming for the forces of Maynila. The battle concluded with the city being set on fire.

Although the Spanish accounts claim that de Goiti ordered his men to set the fire, some still cast doubt on this. Some historians believe it is more likely that the fire was caused by Maynila forces themselves executing a scorched earth retreat which was a common military tactic in the Philippine archipelago at the time.

De Goiti proclaimed victory, symbolically claimed Maynila on behalf of Spain, then quickly returned to Legazpi because he knew that his naval forces were outnumbered. Contemporary writers believe the survivors of Maynila's forces would have fled across the river to Tondo and other neighboring towns.

== Aftermath ==
In 1571, the Spaniards returned with their entire force consisting of 280 Spaniards and Mexicans and 600 native allies from Panay, this time led by Legazpi himself. They successfully occupied Maynila by crushing the resistance posed by tens of thousands of native Muslim militia, and established a settlement there. On May 19, 1571, Legazpi gave the title city to the colony of Manila.

A Kapampangan leader of the Macabebe polity, later identified as Tarik Sulayman (from Arabic طارق سليمان Tāriq Sulaiman), refused to submit to the Spaniards and, after failing to gain the support of the kings of Manila (Lakandula, Matanda) and Hagonoy, Bulacan, gathered a formidable force composed of Kapampangan warriors. He subsequently fought and lost the Battle of Bangkusay Channel. The Spanish solidified their control over Manila and Legazpi was able to establish a municipal government for Manila on June 24, 1571, which eventually became the capital of the entire Spanish East Indies colony and subsequently the capital of the Philippines.

The initial population of the city was around 250.

== Sources ==
- Relation of the Voyage in Luzon sa Blair & Robertson. The Philippine Islands, 1493–1803;Volume III, 1569–1576.
- Scott, William Henry. Barangay, Sixteenth Century Philippine Culture and Society. QC: Ateneo De Manila University Press, 1991.
