= Damon Woods =

Damon L. Woods is a historian and author best known for his various works concerning early Philippine history, specifically focusing on documents "written by Tagalogs in the Tagalog language" from the sixteenth through eighteenth centuries. His work on these texts have led to renewed scholarly discourse on the nature, significance and veracity of the "historical" Barangay and of the larger settlements described in early texts as "Bayan"

Woods was a son of missionary parents, and grew up in Baguio, Philippines. Damon Woods received his PhD in Southeast Asian History from the University of California, Los Angeles, and has since served as a lecturer at UCLA, University of California, Irvine, and California State University, Long Beach.

== See also ==
- William Henry Scott (historian)
- F. Landa Jocano
- Precolonial barangay
