= Battle of Bangkusay =

1571 naval battle during the Spanish conquest of the Philippines

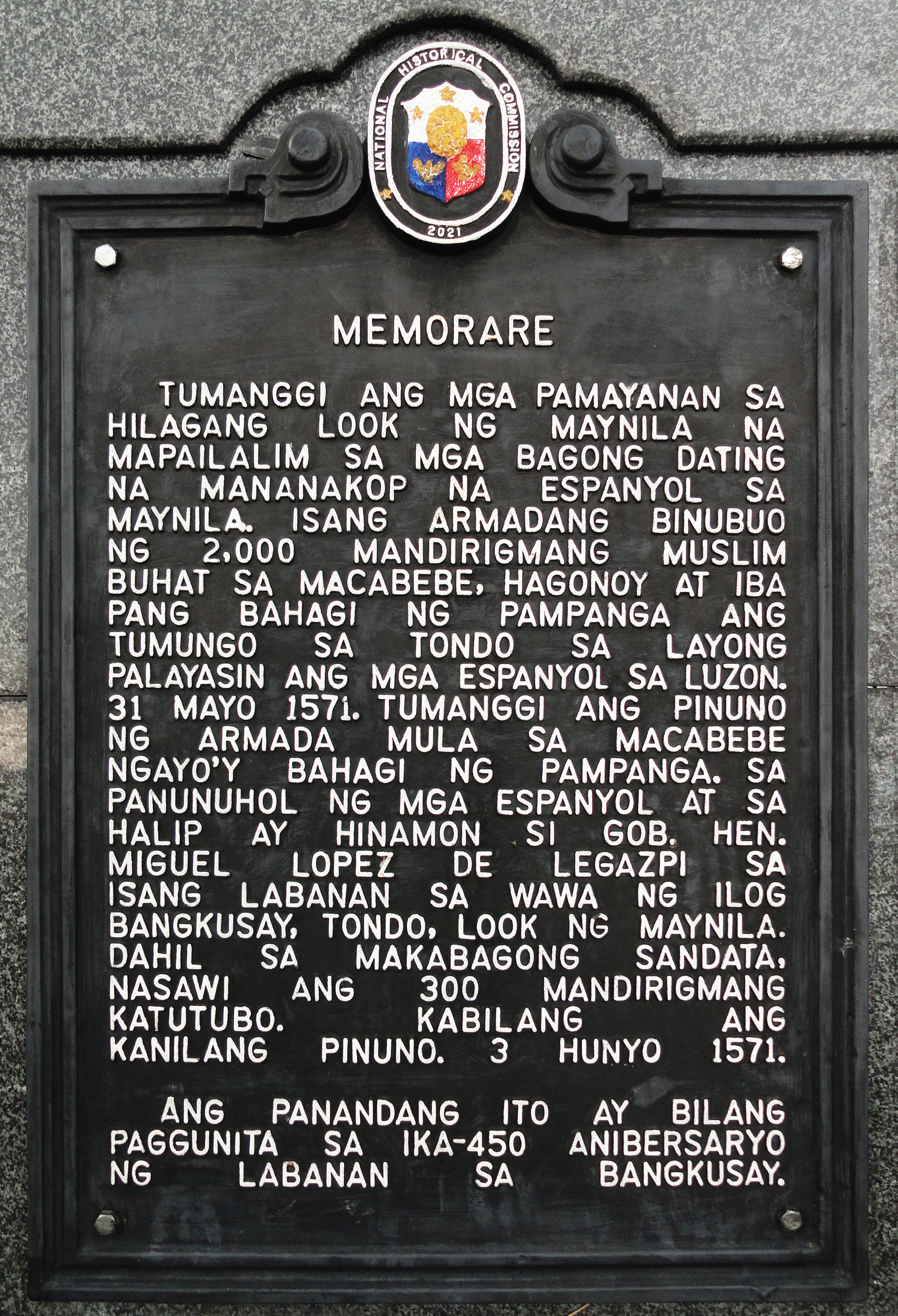
- Historical marker by the National Historical Commission of the Philippines
Date	June 3, 1571
Location	Bangkusay Channel in Tondo, Manila, Philippines
Result	Spanish victory
Territorial changes	Spanish conquest of Pampanga

Belligerents
Indigenous polities of Macabebe and Maynila: Kapampangan forces of Hagonoy and Macabebe; Tagalog forces of Maynila and Butas	(Spain) Spanish Empire: Forces of the Legaspi Expedition; Allied Panaynon forces

Commanders and leaders
Tarik Sulayman †; Rajah Sulayman	Miguel López de Legazpi

Strength
20-30 birays, 1,000+((?) warriors	27(?) vessels, 70 arquebusiers, 600(?) warriors

The Battle of Bangkusay (Filipino: Labanan sa Ilog Bangkusay; Spanish: Batalla de Bangkusay), on June 3, 1571, was a naval engagement in Bangkusay Channel off the coast of Tondo that marked the last resistance by locals to the Spanish Empire's occupation and colonization of the Pasig River delta, which had been the site of the indigenous polities of the Rajahnate of Maynila and Tondo.

Tarik Sulayman, the chief of Macabebes, refused to ally with the Spanish and decided to mount an attack at Bangkusay Channel on Spanish forces, led by Miguel López de Legazpi. Sulayman's forces were defeated, and Sulayman himself was killed. The Spanish victory in Bangkusay and Legazpi's alliance with Lakandula of Tondo, enabled the Spaniards to establish themselves throughout the city and its neighboring towns.

== Background ==
Miguel López de Legazpi was searching for a suitable place to establish the Spanish colonial capital after being forced to leave first Cebu and then Iloilo by Portuguese pirates. In 1570, Martin de Goiti and Captain Juan de Salcedo, with food stocks diminishing, discovered a rich kingdom on Luzon and saw its potential. De Goiti anchored at Cavite, and tried to establish his authority peaceably by sending a message of friendship to Maynila. Rajah Sulayman, its ruler, was willing to accept the friendship that the Spaniards were offering, but did not want to submit to its sovereignty. Thus, Sulayman declared war. As a result, De Goiti and his army attacked Maynila in June 1570. After a stout fight, Sulayman and his men were forced to flee uphill. After the Spaniards had left, the natives returned.

In 1571, the Spaniards returned with their entire force consisting of 280 Spaniards and 600 native allies, this time led by Legazpi himself. Seeing the Spanish approaching, the natives set the city on fire and fled to Tondo. The Spaniards occupied the ruins of Maynila and established a settlement there. On May 19, 1571, Legaspi gave the title "city" to the colony of Manila. The title was certified on June 19, 1572.

A Kapampangan leader of the Macabebe tribe, later identified as Tarik Sulayman, refused to submit to the Spaniards and, after failing to gain the support of the chieftains of Maynila, Tondo (Lakandula, Matanda), and nearby old settlements of the present-day Bulacan province, mostly Hagonoy, Bulacan, gathered a force composed of Bulacan "Kapampangan" and Kapampangan warriors.

== Battle ==
On June 3, 1571, Tarik Sulayman, supported by Rajah Sulayman, led his troops down the Pampanga River and fought the battle in the bay of Bangkusay, off the port of Tondo. The Spanish ships, led by Martin de Goiti, were ordered to be fastened two-by-two which created a solid mass formation which seemed to be an easy target. The native warships were lured by this deception and they surrounded the Spanish. The Spanish, surrounded by the native boats, opened fire and the native fleet was scattered and destroyed.

The chief who died at Bangkusay is sometimes identified as Rajah Sulayman of Maynila, Lakandula's contemporary. However, it is clear in the Spanish records that Rajah Sulayman was able to survive the battle by escaping to Pampanga and it was the nameless Kapampangan chief, identified as Tarik Sulayman, that fell in the battle.

== Historical Account ==
All that I have above related having taken place, it was decided to make peace with the nearest villages, some of whom had come to beg it from the governor, and others would not. Among those who would not come was a village called Butas, situated on an inlet on the other side of the river flowing past Manilla, and about a league and a half away. This village, uniting with the others near by, sent word that they did not wish peace or friendship with the governor; and had the boldness to come as far as the village of Alcandora, quite close to Manilla, whence they sent defiance to the governor and the captains. Having endured this a number of times and having made offers of peace, it finally became impossible to endure such insolence; and the governor had to send the master-of-camp, with seventy soldiers and several native leaders, by sea to fight with those Indios at their village, where they were waiting with twenty or thirty of their boats, with one or two culverins in each boat. He set out (after having heard mass) on the day of the Feast of the Holy Ghost, which was the third of the month of June in the year above mentioned. The master-of-camp, having embarked with the soldiers, arrived at the place where the enemy were assembled at twelve o'clock on that day. When they saw that he was entering the port, they sailed out to attack him with their boats (which were, as I said, twenty or thirty in number), and with a great outcry began to fire their culverins and many arrows. It was God's will that they caused no injury to our forces. Taking note of the order used by the enemy, the command was given for the Spaniards to fasten their boats by twos, and to row slowly toward the opposing forces. When they were in close proximity, all the arquebusiers began to shoot and to cause injuries among the enemy—who, not being able to endure the firing, which killed many of them, began to turn their backs and retreat to the land. When the Pintados Indios who accompanied the master-of-camp saw the enemy in retreat, they threw themselves into the water in pursuit, and caused great slaughter among them; for they are bitter enemies of the natives of this island of Luzón. And thus they attacked them on land, capturing all their boats and taking two hundred of the natives prisoners; and later they captured two or three hundred more. On the land there were five or six culverins in a little fort, which was captured. In this manner were routed those Indios, who had shown so much pride and had so little courage. On the morning of the next day the master-of-camp came to the city with all the booty, and divided the prisoners as slaves among the soldiers, reserving a fifth for his Majesty.

— Unknown writer, Relation on the Conquest of the Island of Luzon (1572)

The peace which Rajah Soliman and Lacandola had made, was, on their part, by no means sincere, for the Indios of Macabebe and Hagonoy, appearing at the mouth of the harbour of Bancusay, with forty caracoas (an Indio vessel), proceeded to the house of Lacandola. These men jeered at and reproached the Indios, for submitting with such readiness, to such an insignificant number of Spaniards, promising, if they were disposed to shake off the yoke, that they should be assisted from Tondo and the neighbouring country, and not leave one Spaniard alive. The chief, supposing those Indios who had arrived, had come to solicit peace, sent two Spaniards to assure them that they might present themselves to him without fear. The chief of the Indios, after listening to these ambassadors, leaped on his feet, and drawing and flourishing his cimeter [scimitar], he said, “The sun gave me life, and I must not be disgraced in the eyes of my women, who would detest me, if they thought I was capable, of being on friendly terms with the Spaniards.” With this speech he quitted the house, without waiting to go down by the ladder, for, with great boldness, he leaped out of the window into his caracoa, calling out to the Spaniards, “I expect you in the bay of Bancusay.” Legaspi determined upon punishing such conduct, and sent against him the Colonel Martin de Goite with eighty Spaniards, in some newly constructed small vessels. The Indio chief was true to his word, and waited for them where he had said, with his squadron. The battle began, and he fought with great valour; but, in a short time, being killed by a musket shot, the rest dismayed, fled with great precipitation; our people pursued, and made many prisoners, among whom were the son of Lacandola, and his nephew, by which his deceit and dissimulation were sufficiently manifest; the chief, however, sent them home, without the punishment they merited for their treason. After this engagement, the natives became so much afraid of the Spaniards, that many chiefs came to Manila begging peace, and offering to become vassals of the king of Spain.

— Fr. Martinez de Zuniga, Estadismo (1803)

== Aftermath ==
Legazpi was able to establish a municipal government for Manila on June 24, 1571, which eventually became the capital of the entire Spanish East Indies colony and subsequently the capital of the Philippines. The initial population of the city was around 250.

== See also ==
- Rajah Matanda
- Pampanga
- Tarik Sulayman
- Philippine revolts against Spain
