= Rajah Matanda =

King of Luzon from c. 1521 to 1572

Ache
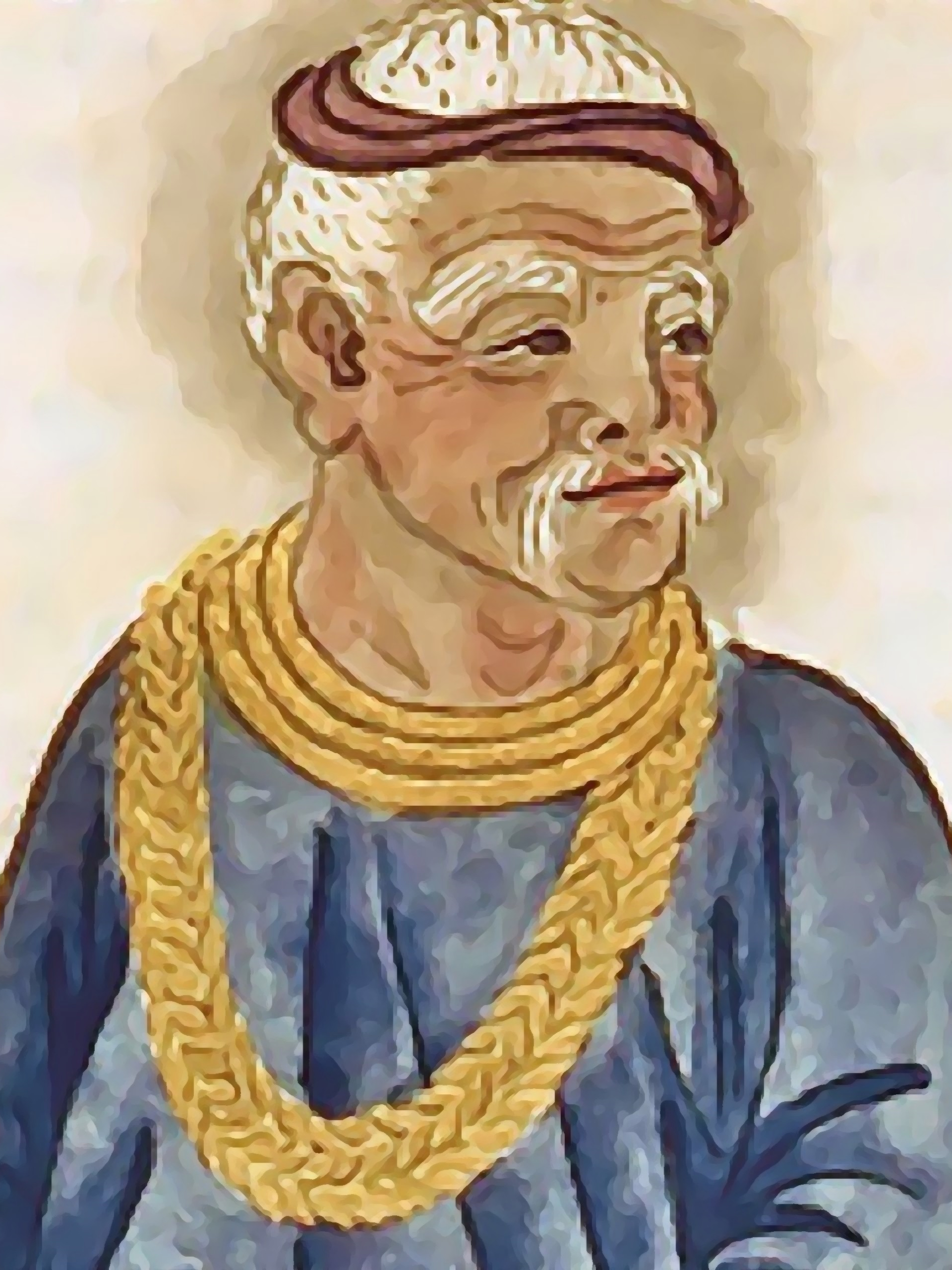
- An old Tagalog king or noble illustrated in the 1590s Manila manuscript. It is assumed that King Ache would have worn similar regalia.

Rajah of Maynila
- Reign: after 1521 – August 1572
- Predecessor: Unnamed mother (Note: Kapampangan historian Mariano A. Henson names the mother of Ache as "Ysmeria".)
- Successor: Sulayman: Don Ambrocio Mag-isa Ladyangbata; Don Luis Ylao; Doña Maria Bolactala
- Born: c. 1500s
- Died: August 1572

Ache (c. 1500s - 1572; Old Spanish orthography: Rája Aché or Raxa Ache, also known as Ráha Matandâ ("the Old King"), was Rajah (roughly King) of Maynila, now the site of the capital of the Republic of the Philippines, Manila. The pre-colonial wider Maynila region connected by Manila Bay was also known as Lusong, from which the much larger colonial and modern region of Luzon was later named after. A younger Ache thus appears as the "Prince of Luzon" in historical testimonies predating the Spanish conquest of Maynila in his old age when he was the Rajah Matanda, but "Luzon" in this context should be understood to mean Lusong, i.e. only Maynila and the wider Manila Bay area at most instead of the whole of modern-day Luzon.

While still the Crown Prince of Maynila/Luzon and the grand admiral for the King of Brunei, Ache married a princess of Brunei in 1521. He was the King of Maynila/Luzon in 1570 when his nephew, the heir apparent (raja muda or raja mura) Sulayman together with Bunao, titled Lakandula, the lord of Tondo, engaged in a battle with the Martin de Goiti naval detachment to Luzon augmented by Cebuano military volunteers and part of the Legaspi expedition of Spain commissioned from New Spain to find the Maluku Islands. This battle resulted in the fall of Manila and the capture of 13 pieces of artillery.

== Biography ==
=== Early life ===
Among the Spanish accounts of Ache's capture, that of Rodrigo de Aganduru Moriz is considered among those which extensively record Ache's statements. Details of Ache's early life are thus usually based on the Aganduru Moriz account.

According to this document, Ache's unnamed father died when he was still very young, and his mother acceded as ruler of Maynila. In the meantime, Ache was raised alongside his cousin, the ruler of Tondo, and this person is identified by some to be Bunao Lakandula.

During this time, the "young prince" Ache realized that his mother was being "slyly" taken advantage of by his cousin, the ruler of Tondo, who was encroaching on territory belonging to Maynila. When Ache asked his mother for permission to address this matter, she refused and told him to keep his peace.

Ache could not accept this, and thus left Maynila with some of his late father's trusted men to see his "grandfather", the Sultan of Brunei, and request assistance. The Sultan responded by giving Ache a position as commander of his naval forces. Pigafetta noted that Ache was "much feared in these parts", but especially by the non-Muslims, who considered the Sultan an enemy potentate. He was a strict enforcer of Islamic rule in Brunei and Maynila as he waged war against Tondo. The Sultan commended him for successfully sacking the Buddhist city of Loue in southwest Borneo, which adhered to the old religion and resisted the authority of the Sultanate.

==== Encounter as Crown Prince of Luzon with Sebastian Elcano, an expeditionary captain for Spain (1521) ====
Aganduru Moriz recounts that in 1521, Ache was in command of the Bruneian fleet when they chanced upon what remained of the Magellan expedition, under the command of Sebastian Elcano, somewhere off the southeastern tip of Borneo. Rizal notes that Ache had just won a naval victory at the time, and Rizal and Dery both say Ache was on his way to marry a cousin – a ritual which Scott describes as the usual way that nobles at that time gained influence and power. (Luciano PR Santiago notes that this practice helps explain the close interrelationships among the ruling houses in Manila, Brunei and Sulu.)

Dery notes that Ache's decision to attack must have been influenced by a desire to bring Elcano's ship back to Manila Bay, for use as leverage against his cousin, the ruler of Tondo.

Elcano, however, was able to defeat Ache. As a result, Ache was captured and brought onboard Elcano's ship. According to Scott, Ache was eventually released after a ransom was paid.

=== Reign (until 1572) ===
Sometime between 1521 and 1570, Ache succeeded his mother and became Paramount Datu of Maynila, assuming the title of Rajah.

By the time of the next historical accounts on Ache in 1570, his co-ruler was his nephew, Sulayman, who also held the title of Rajah. This situation, with Maynila seeming to be a diarchy, has been interpreted by scholars in different ways. Luis Cámara Dery says that by the time De Goiti arrived in 1570, Rajah Matanda had already ceded authority to his nephew and heir apparent, Rajah Sulayman, while still retaining considerable influence. According to William Henry Scott, however, Rajah Sulayman was not proclaimed paramount ruler until Rajah Matanda's death in 1572.

==== Meeting Martin de Goiti, a field marshal for the Legaspi expedition of Spain, and witnessing the fall of Manila (1570) ====
By the late 1560s, Miguel López de Legazpi was already searching for a more suitable place to establish the Spanish colonial capital, having found first Cebu and then Iloilo undesirable because insufficient food supplies and attacks by Portuguese pirates. He was in Cebu when he first heard about a well-supplied, fortified settlement to the north, and sent messages of friendship to its ruler, Rajah Matanda, whom he addressed as "King of Luzon." In 1570, Legazpi put Martín de Goiti in command of an expedition north to Manila and tasked him with negotiating the establishment of a Spanish fort there.

When the forces of de Goiti arrived in 1570, they were initially welcomed by Rajah Matanda. But just as Matanda was receiving de Goiti on the shore, Rajah Sulayman and his party arrived, taking on a much more aggressive stance towards the foreigners. De Goiti began negotiating with Matanda and Sulayman so that the Spanish could set up their base of operations in Manila, but negotiations dragged on for several days.

As negotiations broke down, a misunderstanding between the two parties resulted in Sulayman's forces believing they were under attack, and retaliating against de Goiti's shore party. In the ensuing battle, the fortified city of Manila was burned down, and de Goiti's party temporarily overtook Maynila.

Outnumbered and fearing that a shift in seasonal winds would trap him in Manila, de Goiti decided to sail back to Legazpi instead of pressing his advantage.

==== Meeting Miguel Lopez de Legaspi, an admiral for Spain (1571) ====
The following year, Legazpi himself arrived in Manila. He was welcomed first by Lakandula of Tondo and then by Rajah Matanda. Fearing his presence would exacerbate the conflict between Maynila and the Spanish, Sulayman did not meet with Legazpi face to face until later. The rulers of Maynila and Tondo eventually cut a deal with Legazpi, which allowed him to claim Maynila for the crown of Spain, and the Spanish city of Manila was born in June 1571.

=== Death (1572) and succession ===
In August 1572, Rajah Matanda fell ill and requested to be baptised into the Catholic Church. In the same year, he succumbed to his illness.

Before he died, Legazpi granted Rajah Matanda's wish that Rajah Sulayman be declared Paramount ruler of Maynila. The unnamed author of the "Anonymous 1572 Relacion" (translated in Volume 3 of Blair and Robertson) explains that this was in keeping with indigenous laws, which allowed inheritances to be passed on to "legitimate" children. While Rajah Matanda did in fact have children, they were not born of his "legitimate wife". The unnamed author of the relacion, explaining the custom as he understood it, says:

There is a law among these natives [...] that however many wives a man has, among them all he regards one as his legitimate wife; and if, when he dies, he has no children by this woman, the children of the others do not inherit. In illustration of the truth of this, one may cite the death of Laya, whom I have already mentioned. When this man died, a Christian, he had no children by his legitimate wife, and although he had many by his other wives, they did not inherit; therefore his property descended to a legitimate nephew of his. It is true, however, that the bastard children may deprive them of their property.

== Descendants ==
According to archival research of historian Luis Camara Dery, Rajah Matanda had at least two sons and one daughter: Don Ambrocio Mag-isa Ladyangbata, Don Luis Ylao, and Doña Maria Bolactala.

Dery theorizes that unlike their father who had befriended the Spanish, these siblings "appeared to be lukewarm to the Spaniards", so that the privileges and exemptions granted to Matanda's descendants by Legazpi were only claimed by their children and grandchildren – the third (as of 1612) and fourth (as of 1679) generation from Rajah Matanda.

As of 1696, Rajah Matanda's descendants had fallen on hard times, as Dery notes:

From their vast domains in Manila and Bulacan, Rajah Matanda's descendants were displaced and transferred to the outlying towns of Malate and Ermita. Their appointments as Maestras de Campo, Capitanes de Infanteria, Cabezas de Barangay, etc. brought them innumerable expenses, impoverishment, and imprisonment. Their appointments to said positions forced them to shoulder numerous expenses for and in behalf of the colonial government which the latter failed or conveniently forgot to recompense. The passage of time eventually found the descendants [...] so destitute that they could not even pay the media anata (title fee to be paid before the recipient could enjoy colonial exemption).

== Name origin ==
Ache is nicknamed "raja matandâ" which means "the old king". In accordance with this, Spanish records also refer to him as Raja Ache el Viejo (King Ache the Old).

He is also sometimes referred to as Raja Laya, a name that some historians propose to have been derived from an intermediate appellation Ladyang Matanda – a Tagalog approximation of his title.

== Sources ==
Events in Rajah Matanda's life are documented by two different sets of firsthand Spanish accounts.

The better known set of accounts takes place in 1571–72, when the forces of Martin De Goiti, and later Miguel De Legazpi himself, arrived in Manila Bay. These are described in the numerous accounts of the Legazpi expedition, including those by the expedition's designated notary Hernando de Riquel, and by Legazpi himself.

Less known are the accounts of the Magellan Expedition in 1521, by which time Magellan had already been killed and Sebastian Elcano had taken over command of the expedition. These accounts describe how Ache, then serving as commander of naval forces for the Sultan of Brunei, was captured by the men of Sebastian Elcano. These events, and the details Ache's interrogation were recorded in accounts of Magellan and Elcano's men, including expedition members Rodrigo de Aganduru Moriz, Gines de Mafra, and the expedition's scribe Antonio Pigafetta.

Additional details about Raja Matanda are sometimes derived from genealogical accounts which mention him, but these focus on Ache's genealogy, and so do not provide details about specific events.

== See also ==
- Maynila (historical polity)
- Rajah
- Datu
- Lakan
- Philippine revolts against Spain
- Hinduism in the Philippines

== Notes ==
Rajah Matanda House of Salalila Born: c. 1500s Died: 1572
Regnal titles
Preceded by Ysmeria	Rajah of Maynila co-ruler with Sulayman from 1570 onwards c. 1521–1572	Title abolished Manila founded as the capital of the Spanish East Indies
