= Martín de Goiti =

Spanish conquistador (1534–1575)

Martin de Goiti
- Born: c. 1534; Basque Country, Spain
- Died: 1575 (aged 40–41) Manila, Philippines (New Spain)
- Allegiance: Spain
- Branch: (Spain) Spanish Army
- Service years: 1564 - 1575
- Rank: Captain; Soldier (Cavalry / Infantry )
- Conflicts: Central Philippines: * Battle of Cebu (1565); Northern Philippines: * Battle of Manila (1570) * Battle of Bangkusay (1571) * Siege of Fort Santiago (1574) * Battle of Manila (1574)

Martín de Goiti (c. 1534 – 1575) was a Spanish conquistador and one of the soldiers who accompanied the Spanish voyage of exploration to the East Indies and the Pacific in 1565, in search of rich resources such as gold, spice and settlements. They were seeking to find a route to the islands where the previous Spanish expeditions led by Ferdinand Magellan had landed in 1521, and Ruy López de Villalobos in 1543.

From his base in Mexico City, he led the expedition to Manila in the Philippines, ordered by the Spanish general Miguel López de Legazpi in 1569. He then engaged in warfare against the native chieftains Rajah Sulayman, Rajah Matanda and Rajah Lakandula and fought the natives in order to establish European settlements.

== The Battles for Manila (1570 – 1575) ==
The Spaniards arrived in the island of Luzon on 8 May 1570, and camped on the shores of Manila Bay for several weeks, while forming an alliance with the native tribes. On 24 May 1570, disputes and hostility erupted between the two groups. The Spaniards occupied the city of Tondo where they were greeted by thousands of tribal warriors. There, they defeated most of Rajah Sulayman's forces. The Spaniards marched their armies towards the Pasig River, and occupied the settlements in Manila on 6 June 1570 and burned them.

Guerrilla warfare broke out following the battle, which continued for about ten months. The Spaniards fortified themselves in the area and constructed their military barracks of Fort Santiago, which became their outpost for trade with Mexico. The Spaniards gained control of the settlements on 24 June 1571, after the arrival of López de Legazpi in Manila.

The Spanish colonization paved the way for the establishment of Manila as a permanent settlement and capital city of the Spanish East Indies. He later explored Pampanga, Pangasinan and founded several Spanish settlements in Luzon between the periods of 1571–1573. De Goiti, along with other soldiers were granted with estates called haciendas, for the lands they had conquered, by King Philip II of Spain.

In 1574, de Goiti fought in the war against an invasion of about 6,500 Chinese sea pirates who had sailed from the South China Sea. Their leader, Limahong, laid siege on the Spanish settlements in Manila. De Goiti was killed by these pirates. Most of the Spanish reinforcements came from Vigan and Cebu. De Goiti's second in command, Juan de Salcedo left Ilocos Sur, after hearing the news and traveled to Manila where he discovered their settlements had been ceded to the pirates. Salcedo's forces attacked and drove the pirates out of Manila. Limahong and his fleets retreated to Pangasinan where they re-organize their forces.

In 1575, Salcedo's army marched north to Pangasinan, in pursuit of the pirates, and besieged them for three months. There the pirates surrendered to the Spaniards.

== Legacy ==
De Goiti's remains are laid to rest on a knight's tomb inside the San Agustin Church, in Intramuros in the Philippines.

== See also ==
- History of the Philippines
