= Agustin de Legazpi =

Filipino ruler from c. 1575 to 1589

- Lakan of Tondo
- Reign: c. 1575–1589
- Predecessor: Lakandula
- Successor: None (independent functions of noble house dissolved and incorporated into the Spanish colonial administration)
- Died: 1589; Manila, The Philippines
- Cause of death: Execution by hanging
- Father: Rajah Sulayman (adoptive)

Agustin de Legazpi is a prominent historical figure in the Philippines best known as the leader of the Tondo Conspiracy of 1587–1588, the last native ruler of Tondo, and the last individual to hold the title of paramount ruler in any of the Indianized indigenous Tagalog polities of the Pasig River delta, although it had been reduced to little more than a courtesy title by the time of Agustin de Legazpi's execution. He was a great grandson of the Bruneian Sultan and distant descendant of Caliph Hasan ibn Ali and was a convert from Islam to Christianity, his Bruneian name was Rajah Muhammad Zahir al-Din.

== Biography ==
The choice of Agustin as baptismal name alludes to Saint Augustine of Hippo a Christian North African saint from Algeria, back when Algeria was once Catholic before it was conquered by Sunni Muslims. Miguel López de Legazpi, Agustin de Legazpi's baptismal godfather was a fervent Christian who mourned the loss of North Africa from Christianity to Islam and sought to do the reverse in the Philippines. He advocated Augustinian Spirituality, wherein rather than being focused on fallen Old Jerusalem of the broken City of Man, you should focus on the heavenly New Jerusalem, and manifest it with your actions, in which case Old Jerusalem was the Christian lands in the Middle East and North Africa which fell to Islam, and Legazpi's New Jerusalem, being Muslim lands in the Philippines, Miguel López de Legazpi, conquers for Christianity.

Because the historical sources referring to Agustin de Legazpi were all written by Spanish chroniclers, it is unclear whether he used the title of "Lakan", which was reserved for the paramount ruler of Tondo. Historical sources refer to him using the hispanized name "Don Agustin de Legazpi" instead.

Legazpi is believed to have been the biological son of an unnamed deceased sibling of Rajah Sulayman of Maynila, and was adopted as a son by Sulayman upon the death of Sulayman's own only son sometime in the early days of the Spanish conquest of Luzon. Upon conversion to Christianity under the new Spanish regime, he is believed to have been sponsored for baptism by Miguel López de Legazpi himself, explaining the similar family names.

Upon the death of Lakandula of Tondo, Agustin de Legazpi was proclaimed to the title of Paramount ruler at Tondo, even though Lakandula had several male children. Lakandula's children served as Datus under Agustin de Legazpi, and two of them – Magat Salamat and Felipe Salonga – joined Agustin de Legazpi in the Tondo Conspiracy. Agustin de Legazpi married Princess Putri of Brunei as he participated in the raid against Brunei in the Castilian War.

As a result of the uncovering of the Tondo Conspiracy, Agustin de Legazpi and Magat Salamat were executed, while Felipe Salonga was sent to exile in South American part of the Viceroyalty of New Spain, for six years.

== Historiography ==
Aside from his participation in the Tondo Conspiracy of 1587, few definite facts about Agustin de Legazpi's life were documented in 20th-century history textbooks until historian Luciano P. R. Santiago's paper, "The Houses Of Lakandula, Matanda And Soliman (1571–1898)" was published by the Philippine Quarterly of Culture and Society in 1990. The paper drew from the genealogical documents kept in the Philippines' national archives (collectively referred to by historians as the "Lacandola Documents") and from the works of earlier historians such as Cesar Adib Majul, who documented the tarsila genealogies of Sulu and Maguindanao, and has since become considered a seminal work on the genealogy of the noble houses of Manila and Tondo.

== See also ==
- Tondo Conspiracy
- Paramount rulers in early Philippine history
- Magat Salamat
- Lacandola Documents
