= History of Manila =

The earliest recorded history of Manila, the capital of the Philippines, dates back to the year 900 AD, as documented in the Laguna Copperplate Inscription. By the thirteenth century, the city consisted of a fortified settlement and trading quarter near the mouth of the Pasig River, which bisects the city into the north and south.

Manila became the seat of the Spanish colonial government when Spain gained sovereignty over the Philippine Islands in 1565. The Spanish government was situated within the fortified walls of Old Manila (now referred to as Intramuros, meaning within the walls). The walls were constructed to keep out invading Chinese pirates and protect the city from native uprisings. Several communities eventually grew outside the walls of Manila. The city became the center of trade between Manila and Acapulco, which lasted for three centuries and brought goods from the Americas to Southeast Asia and vice versa.

In 1762, the city was captured and occupied by Great Britain for two years as part of the Seven Years' War. The city remained the capital of the Spanish East Indies under the government of the provisional British governor, acting through the Archbishop of Manila and the Real Audiencia. The Spanish military regrouped in Pampanga and continued to harass the British.

In 1898, Spain ceded control of the Philippines after over three hundred years of colonial rule to the United States in the Treaty of Paris (1898), which ended the Spanish-American War. During the American Period, city planning using the architectural designs and master plans by Daniel Burnham was done on portions of the city south of the Pasig River.

During World War II, much of the city was destroyed during the Battle of Manila (1945), the last of the many battles fought in Manila's history, but the city was rebuilt after the war. It was the second-most destroyed city in the world during World War II, after Warsaw, Poland. The Metropolitan Manila region was enacted as an independent entity in 1975.

== Etymology ==
One theory is that Manila is the evolved Spanish form of the native place name Maynilà, which comes from the Tagalog phrase may-nilà ("where indigo is found"). Nilà is derived from the Sanskrit word nīla (नील) which refers to indigo, and, by extension, to several plant species from which this natural dye can be extracted. The Maynilà name is more likely in reference to the presence of indigo-yielding plants growing in the area surrounding the settlement, rather than Maynilà being known as a settlement that trades in indigo dye, since it was founded several hundred years before indigo extraction became an important economic activity in the area in the 18th century.

Another theory is that it came from Maynilad which refers to a shrub-like tree (Scyphiphora hydrophyllacea, formerly Ixora manila Blanco) found in or near mangrove swamps, and known as nilád or nilár in Tagalog. Linguist Vic Romans explains that it's not impossible for native Tagalog speakers to shift the final consonant /d/ in nilad into a glottal stop in nilà. Earliest known evidence of reference to this etymology can be found in the third volume of volume of John Ray's Historia Plantarum in 1704 where Fr. Georg Josef Kamel described:

Nilad arbor mediocris, rarissimi recta, ligno folido, et compacto ut Molavin, ubi abundant Mangle, locum vocant Manglar, ita ubi nilad, Maynilad, unde corrupte Manila (Nilad is an average tree, very rare straight, leafy wood, and compact like Molavin, where Mangle abounds, the place is called Manglar, so where nilad (abounds), Maynilad, whence the corruption Manila).

== History ==
=== Prehistory ===
A map showing the extent of the Austronesian expansion.

The lowland peoples of Maritime Southeast Asia, the Tagalog people who would eventually establish the fortified polity of Maynilà were Austronesians. They had a rich, complex culture, with its own expressions of language and writing, religion, art, and music. This Austronesian culture was already in place before the cultural influences of China, Japan, the Indonesian thalassocracies of Srivijaya and Majapahit, and Brunei, and eventually, the western colonial powers. The core elements of this Austronesian culture also persisted despite the introduction of Buddhism, Hinduism, Islam and, later, Christianity. Elements of these belief systems were syncretistically adapted by the Tagalogs to enrich their already-existing worldviews, elements of which still persist today in the syncretistic forms known as Folk Catholicism and Folk Islam.

These Austronesian cultures are defined by their languages, and by a number of key technologies including the cultural prominence of boats, the construction of thatched houses on piles, the cultivation of tubers and rice, and a characteristic social organization typically led by a “big man” or “man of power”.

==== The Tagalog people and language ====
Not much is known about when the Tagalog and Kapampangan peoples came to occupy the lands surrounding Manila Bay, but Linguists such as Dr. David Zorc and Dr. Robert Blust speculate that the Tagalogs and other Central Philippine ethno-linguistic groups originated in Northeastern Mindanao or the Eastern Visayas. The Tagalog language is believed to have branched out from a hypothesized "proto-language" which linguists have dubbed "Proto-Philippine language," another branch of which was the Visayan language.

Some Philippine historians such as Jaime Tiongson have asserted that some of the words used in the Laguna Copperplate Inscription, the Philippines' oldest extant written document, came from Old Tagalog, although the text itself used the Javanese Kawi script.

=== Early history ===
As the Philippines' oldest extant written document, the LCI provides evidence that a socially complex Tagalog polity, known as Tondo, existed on the Pasig River delta as early as 900 AD - a date that also marks the beginning of written Philippine history. Tondo is generally believed by scholars to have been located on the same location as it did in the sixteenth century: north of the Pasig River, occupying the northern part of the delta.

There are no references that state whether a settlement south of the river, on the southern part of the delta where Maynila was eventually located, also existed at the time the LCI was written. Ample archeological evidence exists, however, that the settlement of Namayan (also called Sapa) flourished further up the Pasig River some time in the tenth or eleventh century.

==== Legends regarding the foundation of early Maynila ====
The many myths and traditions surrounding early Maynila's founding all point to a Tagalog settlement south of the Pasig River, which gained prominence as a result of an alliance with or annexation by an outside force. These tales cover a time period ranging from the mid-1200s to the early 1600s."

===== Establishment through defeat of Rajah Avirjirkaya by Rajah Ahmad of Brunei (c. 1258) =====
According to Mariano A. Henson's genealogical research (later brought up by Majul in 1973, and by Santiago in 1990) a settlement in the Maynila area already existed by the year 1258. This settlement was ruled by "Rajah Avirjirkaya" whom Henson described as a "Majapahit Suzerain".

According to Henson, this settlement was attacked by a Bruneian commander named Rajah Ahmad, who defeated Avirjirkaya and established Maynila as a "Muslim principality".

==== Maynila as Saludang/Selurong ====
In the 14th century, according to the epic eulogy poem Nagarakretagama, which was dedicated to Maharaja Hayam Wuruk of the Madjapahit, Seludong/Selurung was listed in Canto 14 alongside Sulot (Sulu) and Kalka as its territories.

The idea of Maynila being Saludang was first mentioned in a book by Cesar A. Majul titled 'Muslims in the Philippines' (1973), stating:

"Brunei Sultan Bulkeiah (Nakhoda Ragam), who "was the Rajah who conquered the kingdom of Soolook and made a dependency of the country of Selurong, the Rajah of which was called DATOH GAMBAN", according to the Brunei Selesilah. Now, according to Brunei tradition, Selurong is said to be "in the island of Luzon and the site of the present town of Manila".

Many other scholars, such as William Henry Scott (1994) and Mohammed Jamil Al-Sufri (2000), acknowledged the theory of Maynila as Selurong/Saludang. Scott noted that "according to Bruneian folk history", [ ] "Manila was probably founded as a Bornean trading colony about 1500, with a royal prince marrying into the local ruling family." In the original Selesilah however,Datu Imam Aminuddin mentions:

"... and the Sultan begot Sultan Bolkiah, who fought a war with the people of Sulu and defeated the kingdoms of Sulu and Seludang whose ruler was Datu Gamban. Sultan Bolkiah was also named by the elders as 'Nakhoda Ragam'. He married Princess Lela Manjani (Menchanai)."

French linguist Jean-Paul Potet notes that "According to some, Luzon and Manila would have been called Seludong or Selurong by the Malays of Brunei before the Spanish conquest (Cebu 1565, Manila 1571)." However, Potet also points out that "there is no text to support this claim. Conversely, Borneo has a mountain site called Seludong." Saunders (1994) meanwhile suggests that Saludang or Seludang is located on the Serudong River in eastern Sabah.

=== Islamization of Manila (1500s) ===
In the early 16th century, a new dynasty under the Islamized Rajah Salalila of Maynila was established to challenge the House of Lakandula in Tondo. Islam was further strengthened by the arrival to the Philippines of traders and proselytizers from Borneo.

In the mid-16th century, the areas of present-day Manila were part of larger thalassocracies governed by Muslim Rajahs. Rajah Sulayman and Rajah Matanda ruled the Muslim communities south of the Pasig River, and the Lakandula ruled Tondo, the community north of the river. The two Muslim communities of Sulayman and Matanda were unified into Maynila. Both city-states were officially Malay-speaking and held diplomatic ties with the Bolkiah dynasty of Brunei and the sultanates of Sulu and Ternate (not to be confused with Ternate, Cavite).

=== Spanish period ===
==== Spanish conquest of Luzon 1570-1571 ====
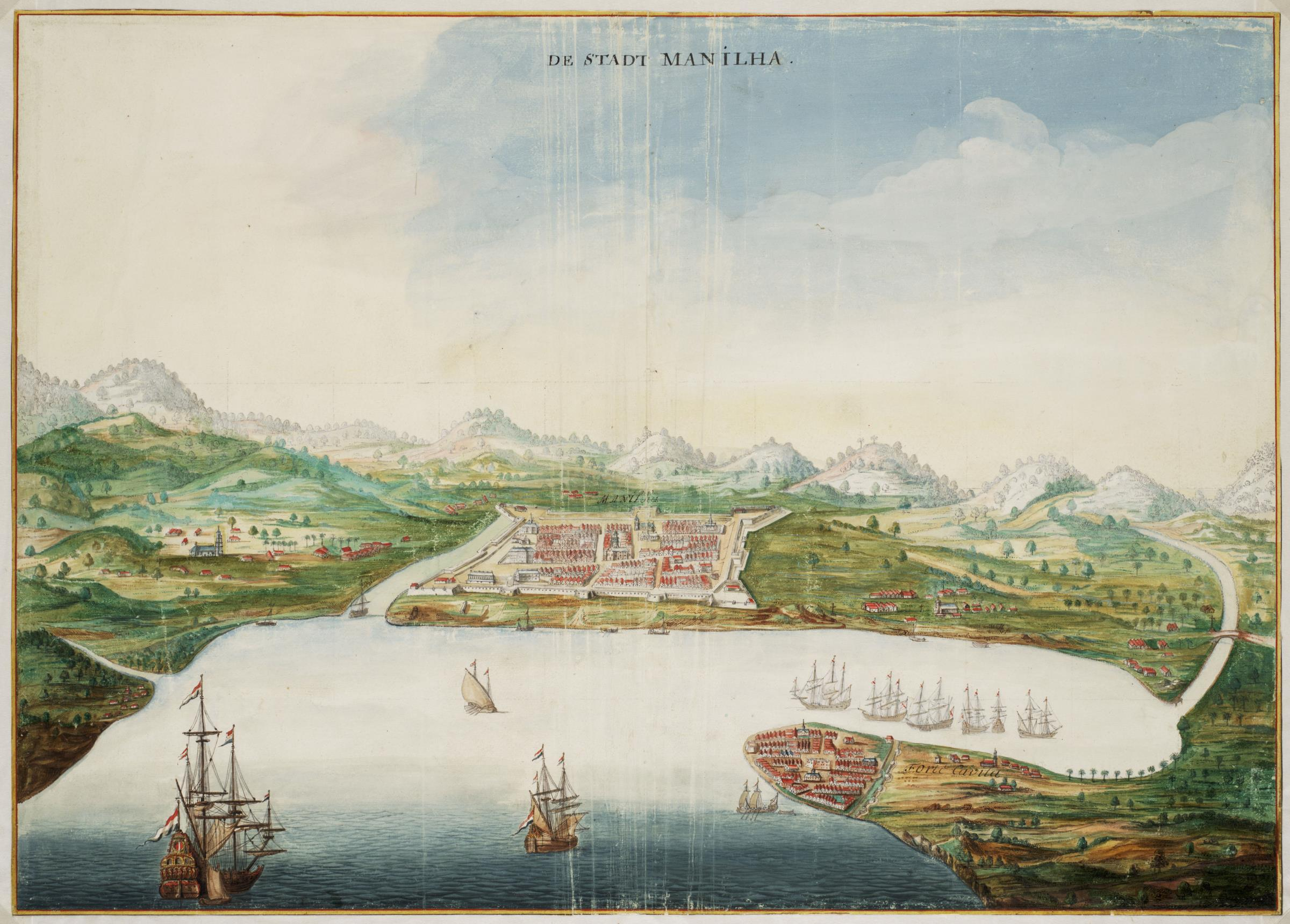
View of Manila, c. 1665

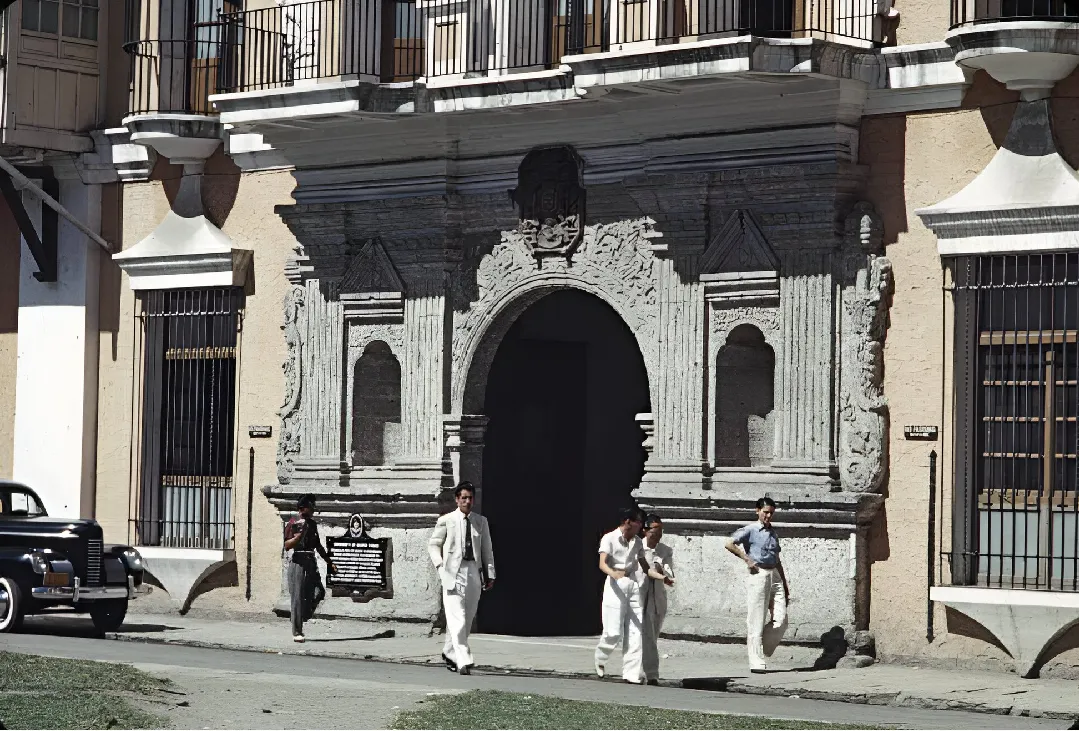
University of Santo Tomas Manila (Intramuros), the oldest university in Asia

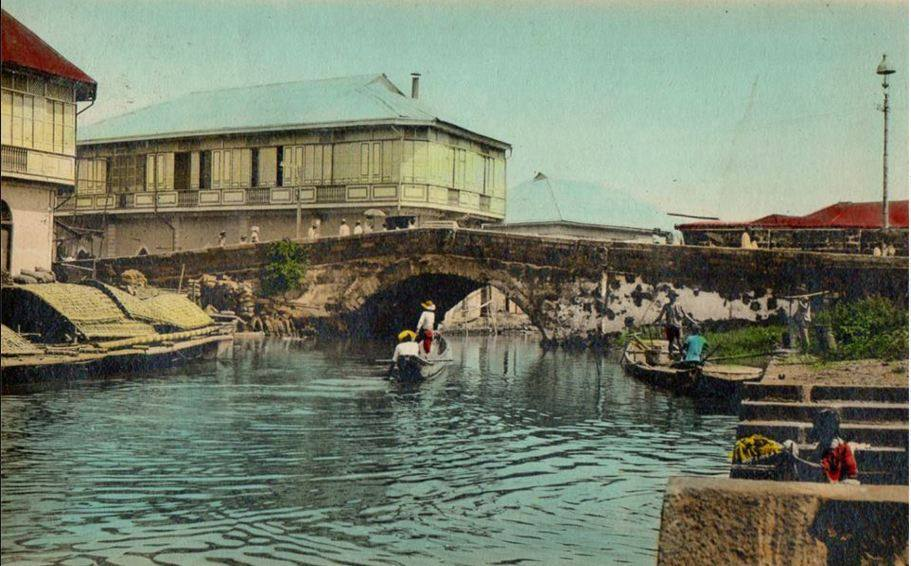
Esteros of Manila

Governor-General Miguel López de Legazpi, searching for a suitable place to establish his capital after being compelled to move from Cebu to Panay by Portuguese pirates, heard of prosperous kingdoms in Luzon. Legazpi sent an expedition under Marshal Martin de Goiti and Captain Juan de Salcedo to discover its location and examine its potential. De Goiti anchored at Cavite and attempted to establish his authority through peacefully methods, sending a message of friendship to Maynila. Rajah Sulayman, its ruler at the time, was willing to accept the friendship that the Spaniards were offering, but did not want to submit to its sovereignty to them and waged war against them. As a result, de Goiti and his army attacked Maynila in June 1570. The fight was fierce but short, and de Goiti captured the city before returning to Panay. And so began the Christianization of Manila.

In 1571, the unity of the Luzon Empire was already threatened by the uneasy alliance of the Rajah Matanda of Sapa, Lakandula of Tondo, and Rajah Sulayman, the rajah muda or "crown prince" of Maynila and laxamana or "grand admiral" of the Macabebe Armada. Powerful states like Lubao, Betis, and Macabebe grew bold enough to challenge the traditional leadership of Tondo and Maynila. The same year, the Spaniards returned, this time led by López de Legazpi himself along with his entire force (consisting of 280 Spaniards and 600 native allies). Seeing them approach, the natives set the city on fire and fled to ancient Tondo and neighboring towns.

=== Spanish colonial era ===
The Spaniards occupied the ruins of Maynila and established a settlement there. On May 19, 1571, López de Legazpi gave the title city to the colony of Manila. The title was certified on June 19, 1572. Under Spain, Manila became the colonial entrepot (transhipment port) in the Far East. The Philippines was a Spanish colony administered under the Viceroyalty of New Spain and the Governor-General of the Philippines who ruled from Manila was sub-ordinate to the Viceroy in Mexico City. The Manila-Acapulco Galleon trade route between the Philippines and Mexico flourished from 1571 until 1815. Manila became famous because of this trade, which transported goods and slaves from a wide area of Eastern and Southern Asia and even East Africa.

Because of the Spanish presence in the area, the Chinese people, who were living in the area and engaging in free trade relations with the natives, were subjected to commercial restrictions as well as laws requiring them to pay tribute to Spanish authorities. As a result, the Chinese revolted against the Spaniards in 1574, when a force of about 3,000 men and 62 Chinese warships under the command of Limahong attacked the city. The said attempt was fruitless, and the Chinese were defeated. In order to safeguard the city from similar uprisings later, the Spanish authorities confined the Chinese residents and merchants to a separate district called Parian de Alcaceria.

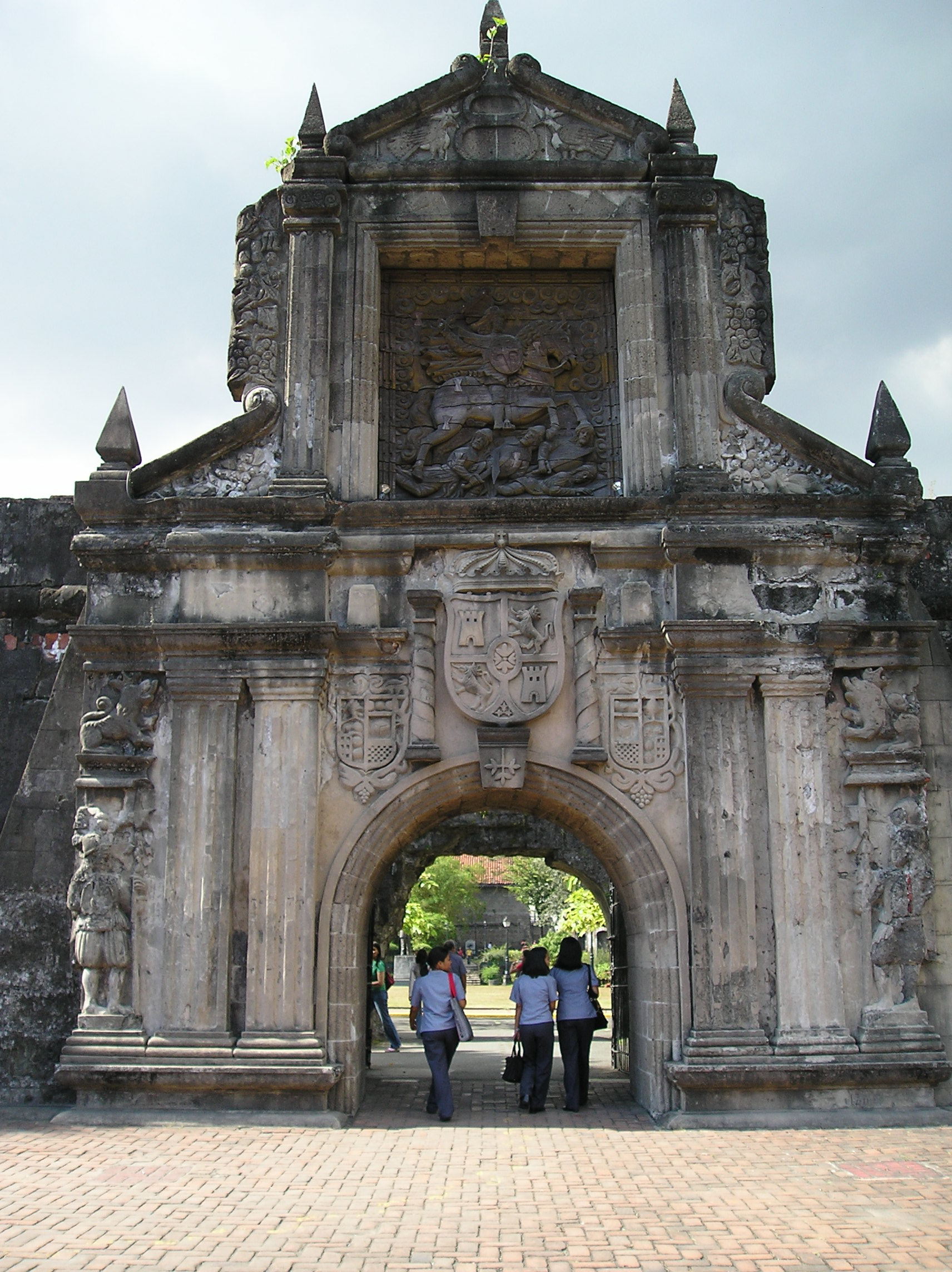
The Entrance of the Real Fuerza de Santiago (now Fort Santiago). This entrance was wrecked during World War II and had to be rebuilt.

On June 19, 1591, after the commencement of the construction of a fort there, López de Legazpi made overtures of friendship with the Lakandula of Tondo, which was prudently accepted. However, the Muslim, Rajah Sulayman, refused to submit to the Spaniards and gathered together a force composed of Tagalogwarriors after failing to get the support of Lakandula and that of the leaders of Hagonoy and Macabebe. On June 3, 1571, Sulayman led his troops and attacked the Spaniards in a decisive battle at the area of Bangkusay, but were defeated. With the destruction of Sulayman's army and the friendship with the Lakandula, the Spaniards began to establish themselves throughout the city and its neighboring towns. Afterwards came the rapid Christianization of the natives of the city. The first missionaries to arrive were the Augustinians, followed by the Franciscans, Jesuits, Dominicans, Augustinians and other religious orders. The friars also began to establish schools and churches dedicated to the Christian faith, eventually spreading throughout Manila and beyond.

In 1595, Manila was decreed to be the capital of the Philippines, although it had already in fact served that function practically from its founding in 1571. Legazpi then ordered the creation of a municipal government or cabildo with a set of Spanish-style houses, monasteries, nunneries, churches, and schools giving birth to Intramuros. The layout of the city was haphazardly planned during this era as a set of communities surrounding the fortified walls of Intramuros (within the walls), which was the original Manila. Intramuros, one of the oldest walled cities in the Far East, was constructed and designed by Spanish Jesuit missionaries to provide protection from invading Chinese pirates and native uprisings. The walled district of Intramuros, as well as the suburbs outside Intramuros, housed a total of 1200 Spanish families and garrisoned 400 Spanish soldiers.

At various times in the following century, the Chinese rose in revolt against the Spaniards. In 1602, they set fire to Quiapo and Tondo, and for a time threatened to capture Intramuros. In 1662, they again revolted, while in 1686, a conspiracy led by Tingco plotted to kill all the Spaniards. These events led to the expulsion of the Chinese from Manila and the entire country by virtue of the decrees that were made by the Spanish authorities to that effect. However, later reconciliations nearly always permitted the continuation of the Chinese community in the city.

Approximate locations of the towns of the province of Manila

==== British occupation (1762–1764) ====
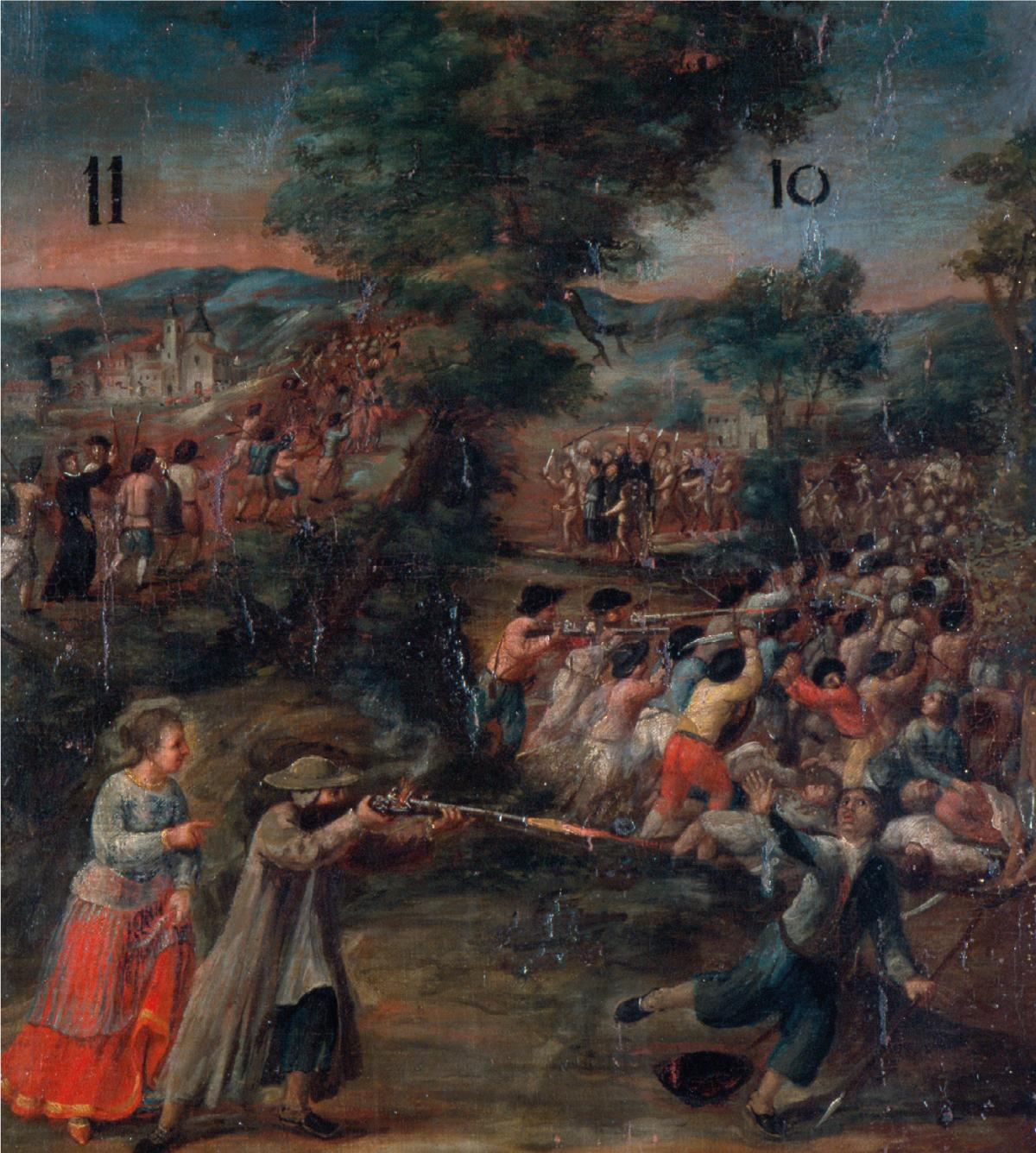
Simon de Anda and his Filipino soldiers defense against British Indian soldiers.

British forces conquered Manila in October 1762 with the city coming under British occupation until 1764 as a result of the Seven Years' War. Spain became Britain's enemy when it sided with France due to ties between their royal families.

The British accepted the written surrender of the Spanish government in the Philippines from Archbishop Rojo and the Real Audiencia on 30 October 1762. The city remained the capital and key to the Spanish East Indies under the government of the provisional British governor, acting through the Archbishop of Manila and the Real Audiencia. The terms of surrender proposed by Archbishop Rojo and agreed to by the British leaders, secured private property, guaranteed the Roman Catholic religion and its episcopal government, and granted the citizens of the former Spanish colony the rights of peaceful travel and of trade "as British subjects". Under the direction of the provisional British governor, the Spanish East Indies was to be governed by the Audencia Real, the expenses of which were agreed to be paid for by Spain. The terms of surrender dated 29 October 1762 signed by Archbishop Rojo, and sealed with the Spanish Royal Seal, ceding the entire archipelago to Great Britain. This was rejected by Simón de Anda y Salazar who claimed to have been appointed Governor-General under the Statutes of the Indies.

Outside of Manila, the Spanish forces in the region regrouped in Pampanga, where Salazar established his headquarters first in Bulacan, then in Bacolor. So successful was Salazar's efforts at harassing the British that Captain Thomas Backhouse reported to the Secretary of War in London that "the enemy is in full possession of the country".

At the time of signing the treaty, the signatories were not aware that Manila had been captured by the British and was being administered by them as a colony. Consequently, no specific provision was made for the Philippines. Instead they fell under the general provision that all other lands not otherwise provided for be returned to the Spanish Crown.

An unknown number of Indian soldiers known as sepoys, who came with the British, deserted and settled in Cainta, Rizal, which explains the uniquely Indian features of generations of Cainta residents. In January 1798 during the French Revolutionary Wars a British naval squadron entered Manila for reconnaissance, seizing three gunboats in the bloodless Raid on Manila.

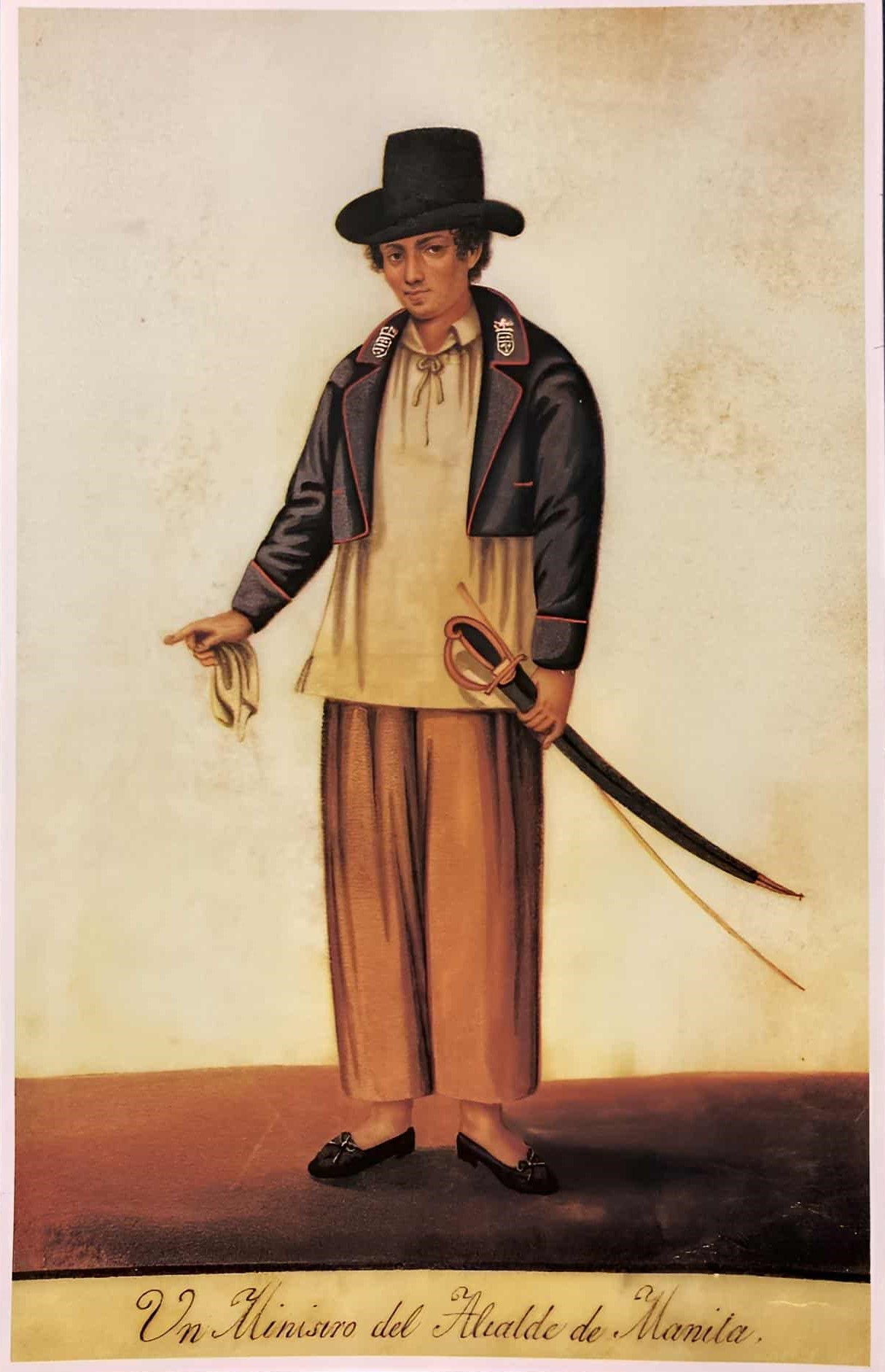
Native minister of the Mayor of Manila, sword and baton symbolized their authority. they are of principalia class and are chosen by the mayor for the job.

==== Spanish rule 1764–1898 ====
Mexican Independence in 1821 necessitated direct rule from Spain. Under direct Spanish rule, banking, industry and education flourished more than it had in the previous two centuries. The opening of the Suez Canal in 1869 helped to facilitate direct trade and communications with Spain. Construction of bridges, roads and railways, and the expansion of the ports came to symbolize the rapid development.

Being the traditional seat of education and liberal thinking in the Philippines, Manila was a rich field for anticlerical propaganda. The seeds of revolution germinated in 1886 with the publication of José Rizal's book Noli Me Tangere (Touch Me Not), a novel critical of the way the Spanish friars were governing the Philippines. The Spanish government condemned the book, and Rizal was exiled to Dapitan. In 1892, he returned to Manila to found La Liga Filipina, a nationalistic organization. Later that year, in Tondo, Andrés Bonifacio founded the Katipunan, a secret organization with aim of overthrowing Spanish colonial rule.

The Katipunan movement grew until open rebellion broke out in August 1896 after its discovery by the Spaniards. Bonifacio's attack on Manila was unsuccessful. Rizal became a martyr of the revolution when the Spaniards executed him by firing squad on December 30, 1896 in Bagumbayan. After several months of fighting, a revolutionary government was formed at the Tejeros Convention in Cavite province with Emilio Aguinaldo at its head. Aguinaldo's government was also unsuccessful in its fight for independence, and as part of the Pact of Biak-na-Bato peace treaty, Aguinaldo accepted exile in Hong Kong.

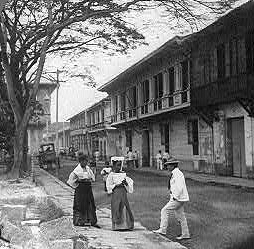

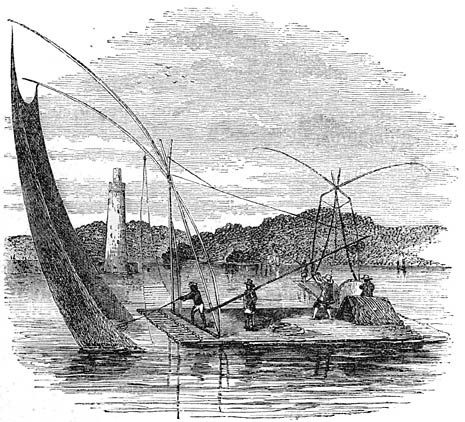

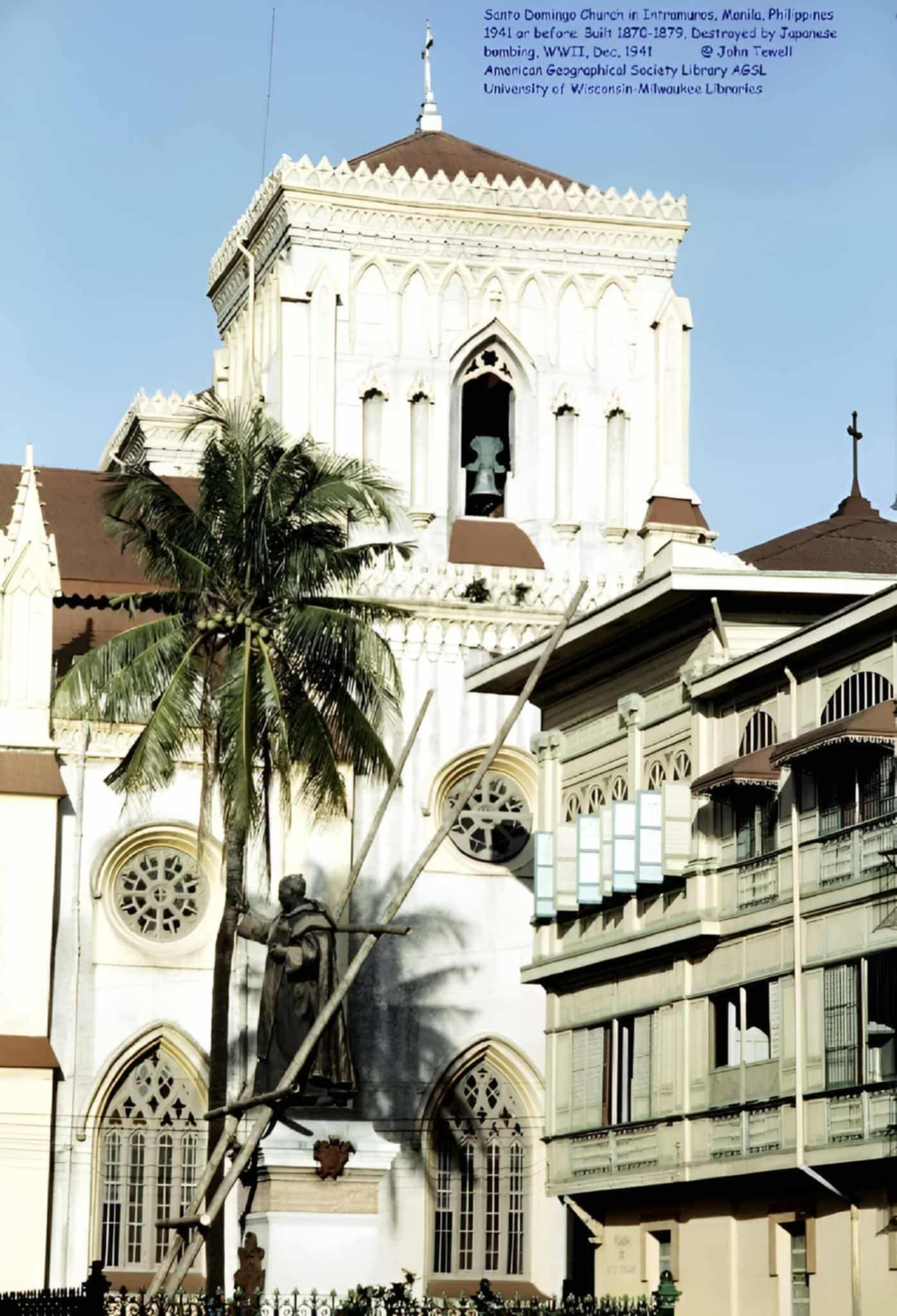
Santo Domingo church, College of Santa Rosa and Benavides Monument in Plaza Santo Tomas

=== American period (1898–1942) ===
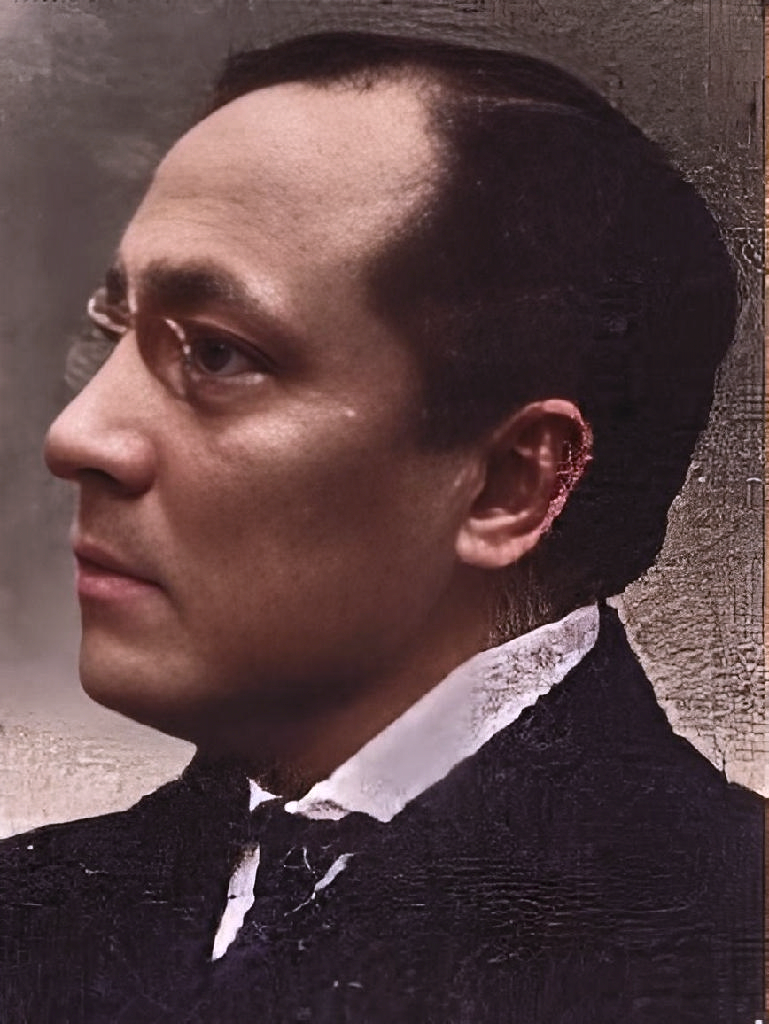
Felix Roxas y Fernandez, The 2nd Mayor of Manila and the son of the architect Felix Roxas y Arroyo who is the nephew of Domingo Roxas, from the prominent Spanish Filipino family in Manila; the Roxas clan.

U.S. troops invaded Manila in 1898 and waged war with the Spaniards and Filipinos in the Spanish–American War and the Philippine–American War. Following the defeat of Spain, U.S. forces took control of the city and the islands in one of the most brutal and forgotten chapters of Philippine American history.

The U.S. Navy, under Admiral George Dewey, defeated the Spanish squadron in the Battle of Manila Bay on May 1, 1898.

During the Battle of Manila the Americans took control of Manila from the Spanish. Admiral Dewey testified that after the battle the Spanish Governor-General wished to surrender to the Americans rather than the Filipinos.

In the Treaty of Paris in 1898, Spain handed over the Philippines to the United States of America for US$ 20,000,000, ending 333 years of Spanish rule in the islands.

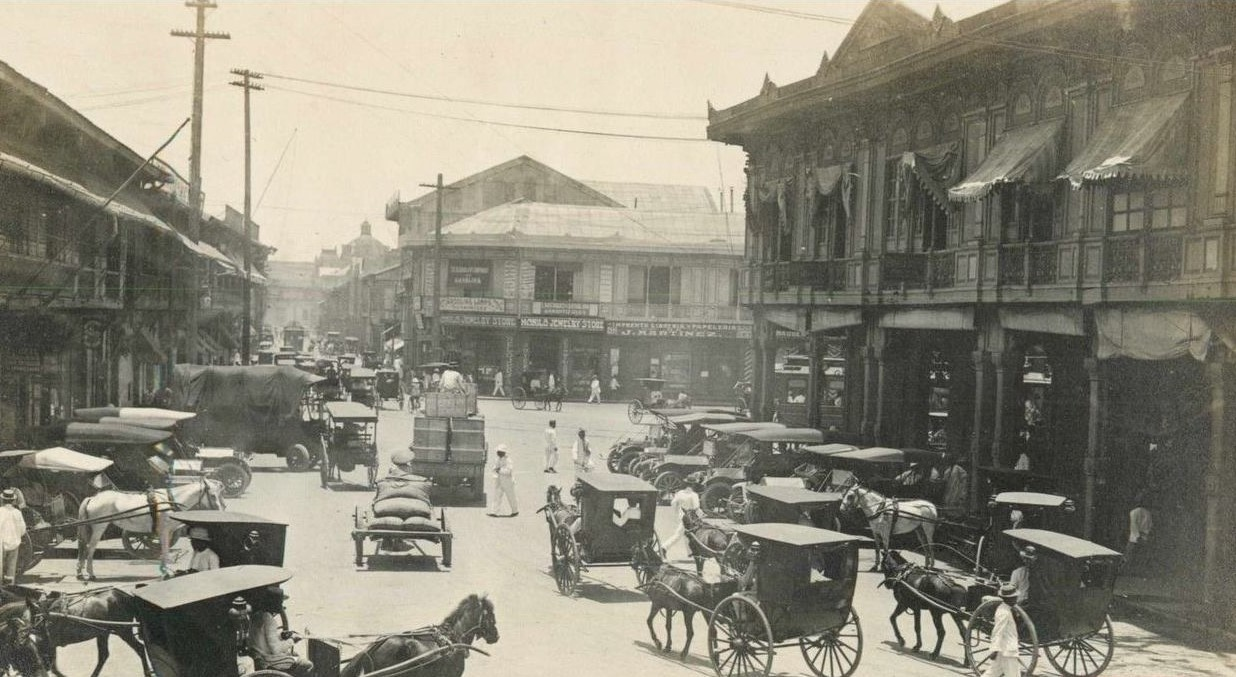
Busy streets of early American-era Manila

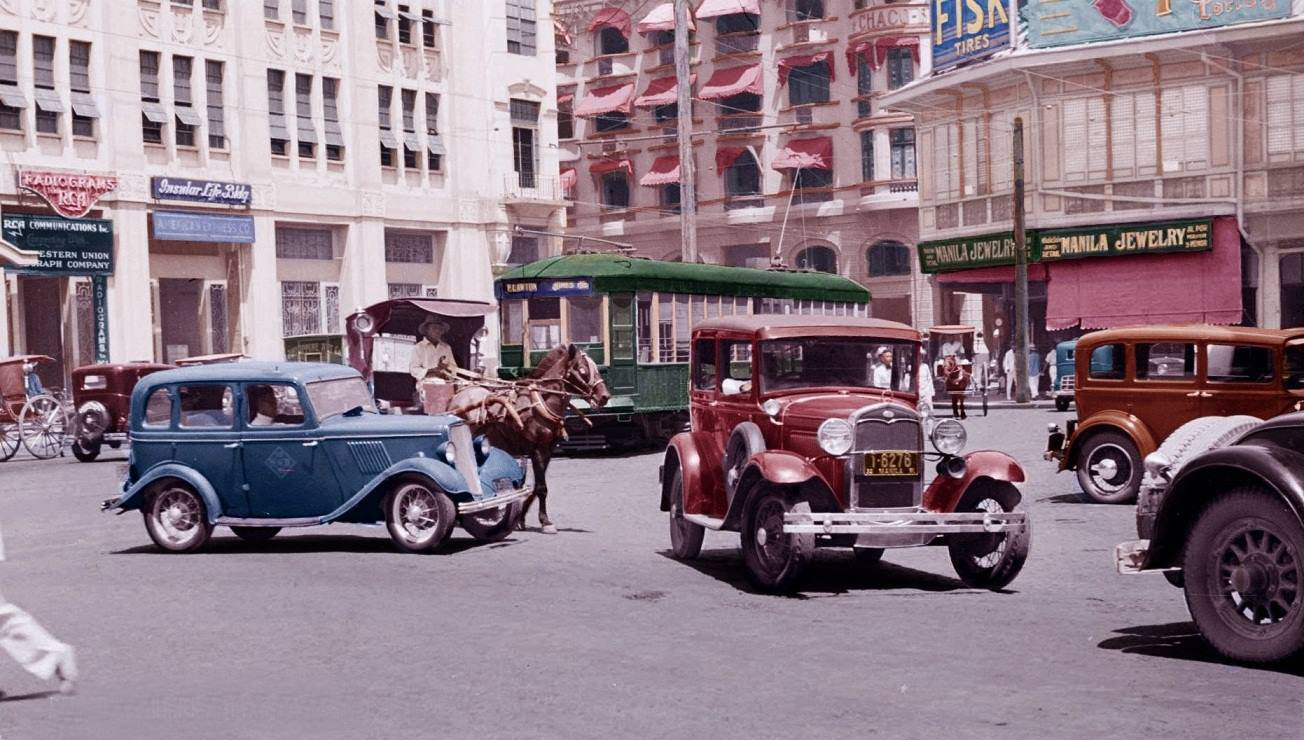
Pre-war cosmopolitan city of Manila

Having just won their independence from Spain, the Filipinos were fiercely opposed to once again being occupied. Emilio Aguinaldo proclaimed the First Philippine Republic at the Malolos Congress and had begun to build the foundations for an independent nation. Admiral Dewey, however, claimed he never recognized the Philippine Republic, as he did not have the authority to do so and did not consider it an organized government.

War broke out between the Filipinos and the Americans on February 4, 1899, the 1899 Battle of Manila, which began the Philippine–American War. The Americans pursued the retreating Filipino forces province by province, until General Emilio Aguinaldo (then president of the Republic) surrendered in Palanan, Isabela, on March 23, 1901.

Manila continued under an American military government until civil government was established for the city on July 31, 1901.

During the American period, Daniel Burnham designed the plans for the city south of the Pasig River following principles of the City Beautiful movement.

In 1935, the United States government committed itself to granting the Philippines Independence after a ten-year transition, a period that was extended by one year due to World War II. The General Headquarters of the Philippine Commonwealth Army was stationed in Manila under the Commonwealth government, and was active from December 21, 1935 to January 3, 1942, when the Philippines was invaded by Japanese Imperial forces.

=== World War II and Japanese occupation ===
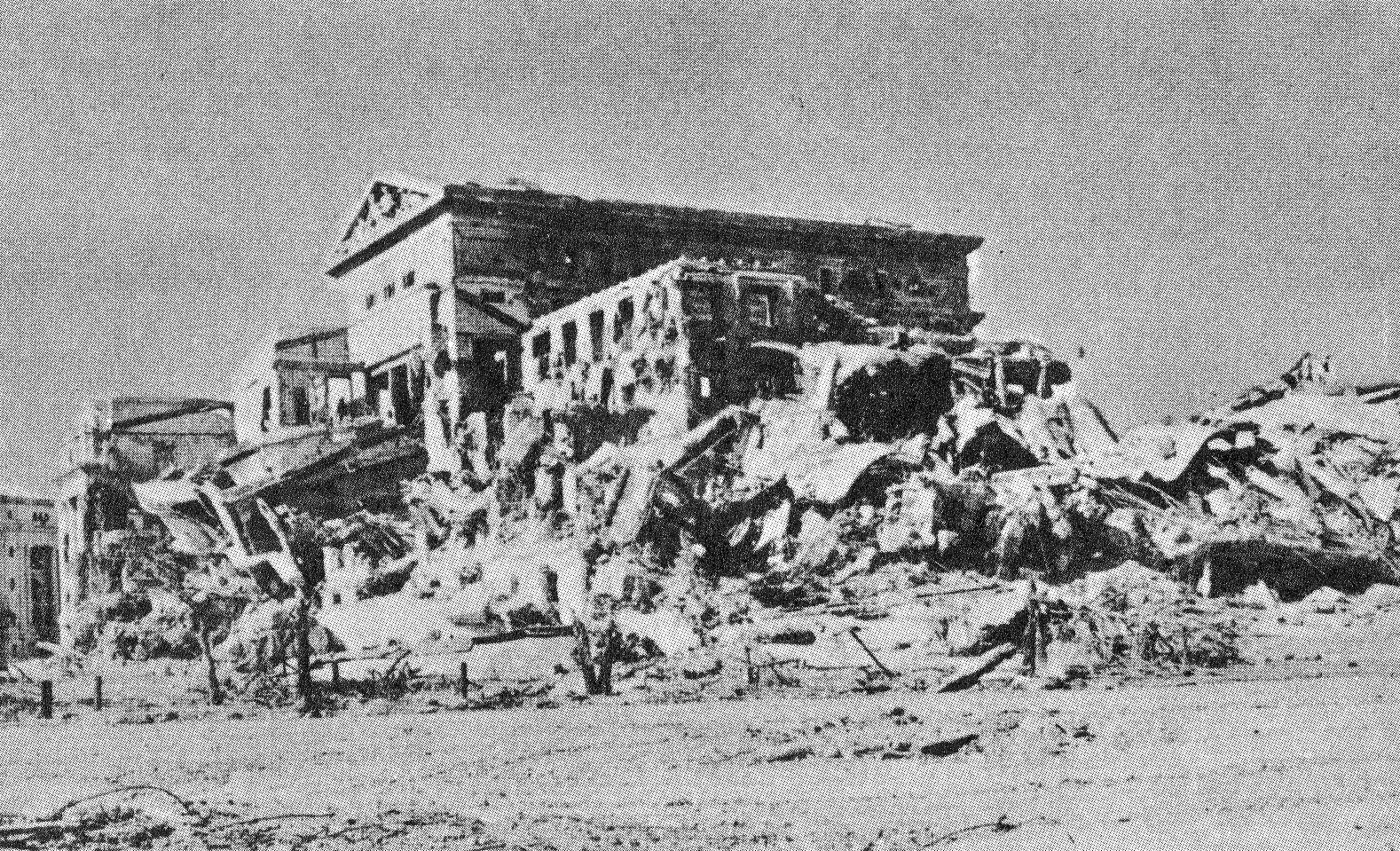
The Legislative Building in Manila after the 1945 liberation.
(Reconstructed and is now a part of the National Museum.)

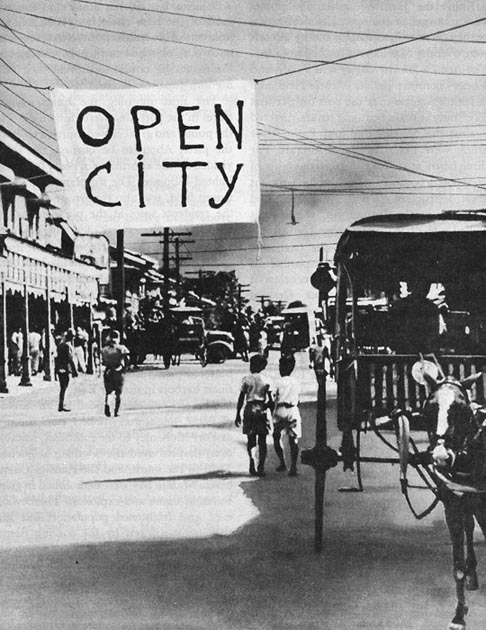
On December 24, 1941, Manila was declared an open city. Newspapers published the text of the declaration radio stations broadcast the news of it. A huge banner bearing the words "Open city" and "No Shooting" was strung across the front of the city hall. That night the blackout ended and Manila was ablaze with lights.

Filipino and American combat units were ordered to withdraw from the city and all military installations were removed on December 24, 1941 (Philippine time). That same day, Manila was declared an open city to spare the city from death and destruction. Despite this, the Japanese warplanes bombed Manila, and for the first time, Manileños experienced an air raid. Quezon issued a decree enlarging the safe zone to include outlying areas of Manila as safe zones, establishing the new administrative jurisdiction, the City of Greater Manila. Manila was divided into four districts: Bagumbuhay, Bagumpanahon, Bagumbayan, and Bagungdiwa. Bagumbuhay encompassed Binondo, San Nicolas, Tondo, and the northern portion of Santa Cruz. Bagumpanahon encompassed the rest of Santa Cruz, Quiapo, Sampaloc, and San Miguel. Bagumbayan encompassed Ermita, Intramuros, Malate, Port Area, and the western portion of Paco. Bagungdiwa encompassed the rest of Paco, Pandacan, and Santa Ana.

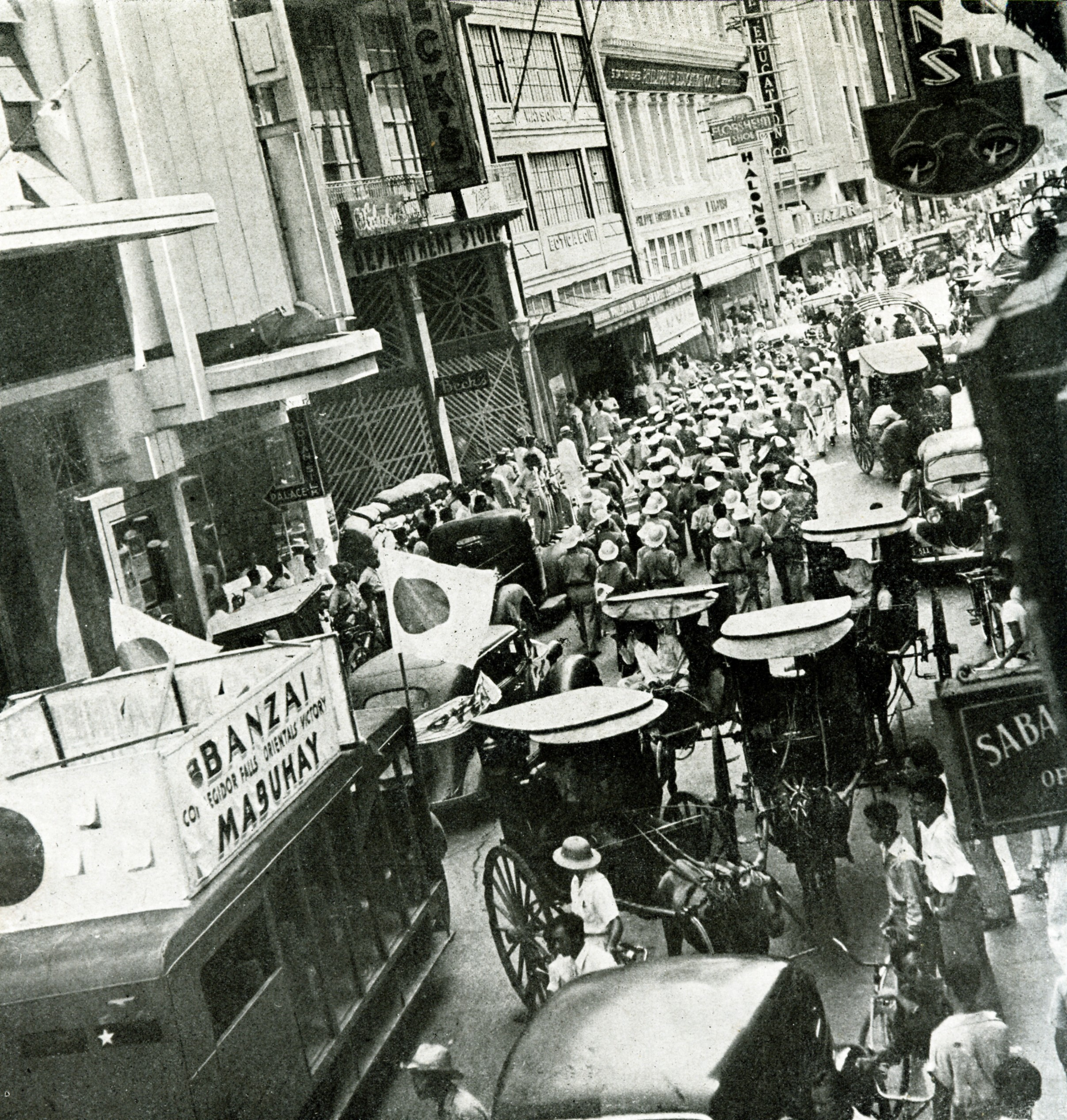
Manila after the fall of Corregidor, May 9, 1943.

The main general headquarters of the Philippine Commonwealth Army was withdrawn and retreated to the military stations in Ermita, Manila. On December 24, 1941, they were closed down following the arrival and occupation of the capital city by the Japanese Imperial forces, who took control of the main general headquarters of the Commonwealth Army on January 3, 1942. Following the Japanese occupation, the general headquarters and military camps and bases of the Philippine Commonwealth Army were scattered across the provinces of the Philippines, including Luzon, Visayas, and Mindanao, from January 3, 1942, to June 30, 1946, actively participating in military conflicts against Japanese forces.

The post of Mayor of Greater Manila was given to Quezon's former Executive Secretary, Jorge B. Vargas. On the evening of New Year's Day of 1942, a Japanese courier delivered notice to Vargas that Japanese forces already bivouacked at Parañaque would enter Greater Manila the following day. From 9 am to 10 am of January 2, Japanese imperial forces marched into the City of Manila.

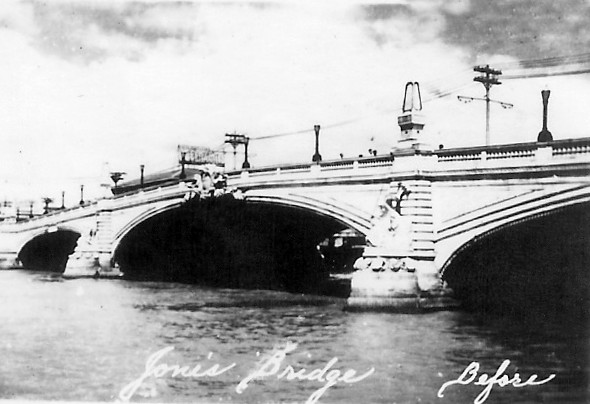
Jones Bridge in its prewar state

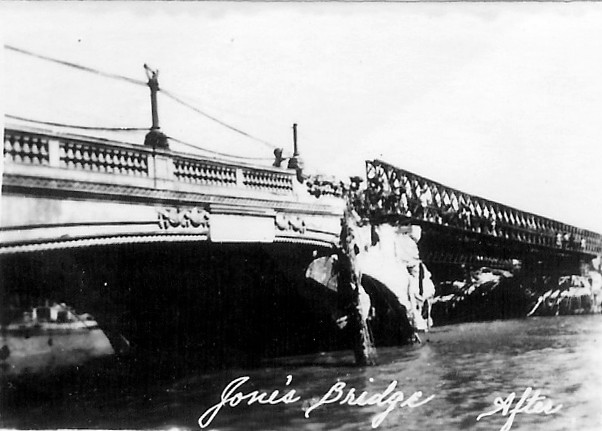
The destroyed Jones Bridge after the war

Vargas was tasked to hand over Greater Manila to the new authorities and present the remaining Filipino leaders to Japanese authorities. Vargas and the Filipino leaders present were asked to choose three options; (1) a purely Japanese military administration, (2) a dictatorial government run by a Filipino under General Artemio Ricarte who went on self-exile to Japan after the Filipino-American war, or (3) a government by commission selected by Filipinos. Vargas and the local leaders chose the third option and established the Philippine Executive Commission to manage initially Greater Manila, and was later expanded to cover the whole of the Philippines.

Vargas assumed the chairmanship of the Philippine Executive Commission and appointed to the post of Mayor of Greater Manila in December 1941, later appointing León Guinto, a Secretary of Labor under the Philippine Commonwealth administration of President Manuel L. Quezon, as his successor in January 1942. Guinto held the position of Mayor of Greater Manila until the liberation of the city.

On October 20, 1944, American and Philippine Commonwealth troops, led by American General Douglas MacArthur, began the reconquest of the Philippines. Gen. Tomoyuki Yamashita ordered the commander of Shimbu Group, General Shizuo Yokoyama, to destroy all bridges and other vital installations and evacuate the city. However, units of the Imperial Japanese Navy, led by Sanji Iwabuchi, refused to leave the city. Thus, from February 3 to March 3, 1945, much of the city was destroyed during the Battle of Manila and 100,000 to 500,000 civilians were killed in the Manila massacre. Almost 85,000 to 140,000 strong Filipino soldiers and military officers under the Philippine Commonwealth Army were sent to military operations around Manila from the main general headquarters of the Commonwealth Army in Central and Southern Luzon, were aided by 3,000 guerrilla fighters and 35,000 American liberation forces. As a result of these events in World War II, Manila was the second most destroyed city in the world after Warsaw, Poland. Once Manila was officially liberated, the rebuilt general headquarters of the Philippine Commonwealth Army and the Philippine Constabulary was relocated to the city on March 4, 1945 to June 30, 1946 after the liberation and prepared the engagements of the military operations in Luzon against the Japanese with the help of Americans and guerrillas. Greater Manila was dissolved, and its towns returned to their pre-war status. On July 4, 1946, the Philippine flag was raised for the first time in Rizal Park. Reconstruction took place during the years following WWII.

=== Contemporary period ===
==== The Golden Age and the Marcos Era (1952–1965) ====
With Arsenio Lacson becoming the first elected mayor in 1952 (all mayors were appointed prior to this), the City of Manila underwent what many historians refer to as the The Golden Age. This was a period of rebuilding the city's infrastructure and economy after the war.

After Mayor Lacson's successful term in the fifties, the city was led by Mayor Antonio Villegas during most of the 1960s, and Mayor Ramon Bagatsing for nearly the entire decade of the 1970s until the 1986 People Power Revolution, making him the longest serving Mayor of Manila.

Mayors Lacson, Villegas, and Bagatsing are collectively referred to as "the Big Three of Manila" by local historians and in the education system by the administration for their comparatively long tenures as chief executive of City Hall (continuously for over three decades, from 1952–1986) and for their contribution to the development of the city and people during this time.

==== The Marcos Era (1965–1986) ====
During the Marcos era, Metro Manila was enacted as an independent entity in 1975 encompassing several cities and towns, being a separate local-regional unit and the seat of government of the Philippines.

==== Fifth Republic (1986–present) ====
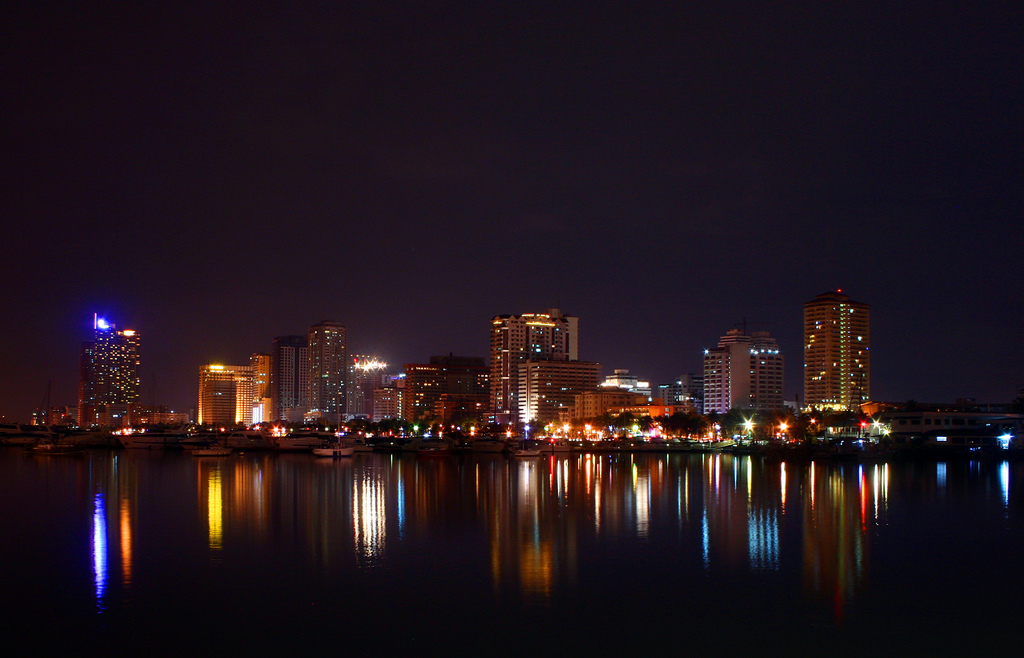
View of the Manila skyline by night from the Harbour Square.

After the People Power Revolution, Corazon Aquino, was installed as president in 1986. During the Aquino presidency, Manila witnessed eight unsuccessful coup attempts, the most serious occurring in December 1989.

In 1992, Alfredo Lim became the mayor, and was known for his anti-crime crusades. When Lim ran for the presidency during the 1998 presidential election, his vice mayor Lito Atienza was elected as city mayor. Atienza was known for renovating most of the city's plaza and projects that would benefit the populace, but also faced criticism from historical preservation activists for demolishing heritage buildings such as the Manila Jai Alai Building. He was the mayor of Manila for 3 terms (9 years), but barred from seeking a fourth consecutive term. Lim defeated Atienza's son Ali in the 2007 city election and immediately reversed all of Atienza's projects claiming the projects made little contribution to the improvements of the city. On July 17, 2008, councilor Dennis Alcoreza filed human rights complaints before the Commission on Human Rights, against Lim, and other Manila officials. Twenty-four Manila officials also resigned because of the mistreatment of Lim's police forces. The relationship of both parties turned bitter, with the two pitting again during the 2010 city elections in which Lim won against Atienza.

Among the numerous controversies surrounding Lim's administration were the filing of human rights complaints against him and other city officials by councilor Dennis Alcoreza on 2008, the resignation of 24 city officials because of the mistreatment of Lim's police forces, and his bloody resolution of the Manila hostage crisis, one of the deadliest hostage crisis in the Philippines. Lim was also accused of graft and corruption, believed to be the cause of the city's bankruptcy. These allegations were later followed by a complaint in 2012 by Vice Mayor Isko Moreno and 28 city councilors which cited that Lim's statement in a meeting were "life-threatening" to them. During the 2013 elections, former President Joseph Estrada defeated Lim in the mayoral race despite having recently moved from neighboring San Juan, where he had previously served as its long-time mayor. Estrada was reelected in 2016 but lost to former actor and Vice Mayor Isko Moreno, who campaigned on a change platform and a youthful image and was colloquially referred to as "Yorme" (a reversed phonemic of the word "Mayor"). In 2022, Moreno launched an ultimately unsuccessful bid for the presidency in elections held that May. He was succeeded by his Vice Mayor, Honey Lacuna, who became the first woman to become Mayor of Manila. Lacuna would however turn out to be unpopular with Manila residents, losing to Moreno in the 2025 Manila local elections.

== Historical battles ==
The first historically recorded battle in the region was the Battle of Manila in 1570, which led to the burning of Maynila and the annexation of the city by Miguel López de Legazpi under the Spanish crown before heading back to Panay for logistical purposes, leading to the rebuilding of Maynila by the Tagalogs. It was followed by another battle in 1571, wherein the conquistador Martín de Goiti arrived from Mexico to drive out the Muslim elite, and the city was razed to the ground. It explains the absence of any pre-Hispanic architecture in Manila. The battle of Manila in 1574, between Chinese pirate-warlord Limahong and Spanish fopces only produced minimal damage to Manila. Folk tradition in Parañaque suggested that Dongalo was named after a figure known as Don Galo, who supposedly repelled Limahong out of the region. However the Spanish documents about Limahong do not mention any figure named Don Galo.

After the battle and occupation of Manila by Britain in 1762, the city was pillaged for 40 hours. The next two consecutive battles for Manila; the battle in 1896 and the battle in 1898 did little damage to the city as whole. The battle of 1899, the first battle of the Philippine–American War, caused more than 200 Filipino casualties.

During the battle of Manila in 1945 between the Japanese Empire and the Allied forces, some 100,000 to 500,000 of Manila's civilians were killed by the Japanese troops in Manila massacre. The whole city was devastated, erasing its cultural and historic identity, including the destruction of the walled city of Intramuros. Reconstruction of the city took place afterwards, with some of Manila's landmarks restored.

== See also ==
- Tondo (historical polity)

== Sources ==
- Bayor, Ronald H (June 23, 2004), The Columbia Documentary History of Race and Ethnicity in America, Columbia University Press, ISBN 978-0-231-11994-8.
- Blair, Emma Helen, ed. (1911), The Philippine Islands, 1493-1803, (Vol. 1, no. 3).
- Boot, Max (April 1, 2002), The Savage Wars of Peace: Small Wars and the Rise of American Power, Basic Books, ISBN 978-0-465-00720-2, LCCN 2004695066.
- Fish, Shirley (2003), When Britain Ruled the Philippines 1762–1764, Bloomington, Ind.: 1st Book Library, ISBN 978-1-4107-1069-7.
- Hancock, Rose (April 2000). "April Was a Cruel Month for the Greatest Manila Mayor Ever Had". 1898:The Shaping of Philippine History. 35. Vol. II. Manila: Asia Pacific Communications Network, Inc. pp. 15–20.
- Kumar, Amitava (October 29, 1999), Poetics/Politics: Radical Aesthetics for the Classroom, Palgrave, ISBN 978-0-312-21866-9.
- Painter, Nell Irvin (May 1, 1989), Standing at Armageddon: The United States, 1877–1919, W. W. Norton & Company, ISBN 978-0-393-30588-3.
- Tracy, Nicholas (1995), Manila Ransomed: The British Assault on Manila in the Seven Years' War, University of Exeter Press, ISBN 978-0-85989-426-5 ISBN 0-85989-426-6, ISBN 978-0-85989-426-5
