= Magat Salamat =

Filipino historical figure

- Lakan of Tondo
- Reign: c. 1580s-1588
- Born: c. 1550; Tondo
- Died: 1589 (aged 38–39); Manila, Philippines
- Cause of death: Execution by hanging
- Father: Bunao Lakandula
- Occupation: Datu in charge of a barangay (a term which at the time meant a "following" or "loyalty group"), recognizing Agustin de Legazpi as lakan (paramount ruler)

Datu Magat Salamat was a Filipino historical figure best known for co-organizing the Tondo Conspiracy of 1587. He was one of at least four sons of Lakandula, (Note: Magat Salamat is a son of Lakandula, not of Rajah Matanda nor of Rajah Sulayman.) and thus held the title of Datu under his cousin and co-conspirator Agustin de Legazpi, who had been proclaimed paramount ruler of Tondo after the death of Lakandula, although the position soon became little more than a courtesy title.

== Lineage ==
For a long time, not much was known about Magat Salamat outside of his participation in the Tondo Conspiracy. As a result, early Filipino historians such as Gregorio Zaide could only definitively say that he was born of noble heritage - presumably somewhere in or near Tondo.

Luciano P.R. Santiago's paper, "The Houses of Lakandula, Matanda And Soliman (1571–1898)", published by the Philippine Quarterly of Culture & Society Journal in 1990, established that Magat Salamat was of at least five children (at least four of whom were male) of Lakandula.

== Early life ==
From a very young age, Magat Salamat had already witnessed and experienced the abuses of the Spanish invaders firsthand. As a boy, he was there the moment Miguel López de Legazpi arrived in Manila in 1571. His father, who was said to be Rajah Sulayman (although recent research lists Lakandula as his biological father) led the resistance against the Spaniards, which would end unsuccessfully due to the superior firepower of the foreign invaders, concluding with Soliman being killed along with his troops in battle. The Spanish were then able to enter Sulayman's village, where they burned and pillaged the neighborhood, including Salamat's own home. Eventually, Salamat also became a chief just like his father before him, specifically the chief of Tondo.

== Motives for conflict ==
As the Spaniards continued to strengthen their grip on the Philippines, they introduced new elements meant to subjugate the Filipino people, such as Catholicism. For Salamat, the idea of adopting this new religion was completely reprehensible, and he refused to do so. These events would become so commonplace throughout Magat Salamat's life that it would eventually manifest in the form of an intense hatred for the Spaniards, and this hatred would lead to Magat Salamat forming a secret society in Tondo, in the hopes of overthrowing the Spanish regime.

"These people (Spaniards) came to our country as friends. But they are not behaving like friends."

== The Tondo Conspiracy ==
=== Involvement ===
Salamat chose to involve himself in the Tondo Conspiracy because, being the chief or Datu of Tondo, wished to recapture it from the Spanish, in turn also recovering his heritage and birthright. Their aim was to restore the freedom they once had prior to the arrival of the Spanish, but they also sought to restore the leadership and power they had as well.

Alongside Salamat were others who shared his ambition, such as the chief of Bulacan, Felipe Salonga, chief of Polo, and Pedro Balinguit, chief of Pandacan, and he was also joined by other chiefs of Tondo, namely Juan Banal and Pitonggatan. Being a family affair as Tondo was his birthright, Salamat was also joined by a few relatives: Agustin de Legazpi, nephew of Lakandula, Salamat's father, and Geronimo Basi, brother of Agustin. Their final ally came in the form of Dionisio Fernandez, a Japanese Christian who reached out to one of his contacts known as Juan Gayo, a Japanese sea captain, in an attempt to secure both manpower and supplies. Gayo would recruit Japanese warriors to assist in the fight against the Spaniards, and in exchange for their assistance, Salamat and the others promised the Japanese half of the tribute to be collected from the Philippines. The Japanese would also attempt to secure aid from areas such as Borneo, Laguna, and Batangas, but it is unknown as to whether or not they were successful. Finally, Martin Pangan, gobernadorcillo of Tondo at the time, also pledged to support the cause, and with their band assembled, a plan came into fruition.

=== "Betrayal" and death ===
Some days prior to the plot's execution, Magat Salamat accidentally revealed the plot to Antonio Surabao, a native of Cuyo who was posing as a supporter of their plot. After he had learned of it, Surabao brought what he had heard to his master, Pedro Sarmiento, the Spanish encomendero of Calamianes, who then scampered to Manila on October 26, 1588, and reported it to the Governor-General at the time, Santiago de Vera. It was then after the revelation of the plot that de Vera had all those involved in the plot arrested, with several of them including Magat Salamat being hanged and executed while others were either fined heavily or exiled to Mexico.

== Legacy ==
=== Magat Salamat Elementary School ===
The Magat Salamat Elementary School or Paaralang Magat Salamat was erected in the city of Manila to honor the last Datu to rule Tondo. The school is located in the 1st District of Manila, along the streets of Sta. Maria, Pavia, and Perla in Tondo, Manila.

=== BRP Magat Salamat (PS-20) ===
The Philippine Navy also has the BRP Magat Salamat (PS-20) as part of its naval fleet. Originally named as the USS Gayety under the United States during 1942 and renamed to BRP Magat Salamat (Bapor ng Republika ng Pilipinas) when it was acquired by the Philippine Navy in 1976. After almost 12 years since it was first commissioned, the BRP Magat Salamat is still in part of the fleet of the Philippine Navy.

== Historiography ==
Aside from his participation in the Tondo Conspiracy of 1587, few definite facts about Magat Salamat's life were documented in 20th Century history textbooks until historian Luciano P.R. Santiago's paper, "The Houses of Lakandula, Matanda And Soliman (1571–1898)" was published by the Philippine Quarterly of Culture & Society Journal in 1990. The paper drew from the genealogical documents kept in the Philippines' National Archives (collectively referred to by historians as the "Lacandola Documents") and from the works of earlier historians such as Cesar Adib Majul, who documented the tarsila genealogies of Sulu and Maguindanao, and has since become considered a seminal work on the genealogy of the noble houses of Manila and Tondo.

== See also ==
- Datu
- Agustin de Legazpi
- Lacandola Documents
- Philippine revolts against Spain
- Paramount rulers in early Philippine history
