= Felipe Salonga =

Cousin of the king of Tondo

Felipe Salonga was a cousin of the king of Tondo, Lakandula and he was a brother of Dionisio Capulong, who was Datu of Candaba while his brother Felipe Salonga was Datu of Polo. He was related to the Sultan of Brunei and also the King of Manila Rajah Sulayman through dynastic links.

He was noted in Philippine history, as having participated in the Tondo Conspiracy, which involved local Filipinos and conspirators from the Sultanate of Brunei and Empire of Japan, and once caught had argued before the Spanish Royal Audiencia of Manila (Court of Law of Spanish Philippines) of their abuses causing the Tondo Conspiracy, and the court, instead of having him executed like the rest of the conspirators, chose to exile him to the Americas especially to the South American areas of New Spain in what was made into Nueva Granada named after a former Emirate in Spain (Emirate of Granada) which is now in the country of Colombia. He was exiled, to "Serve Justice" He was exiled for 6 years in Latin America before he returned to the Philippines.
