= Rajah Sulayman =

16th-century Crown Prince of Luzon

Sulayman
- Co-rajah of Maynila
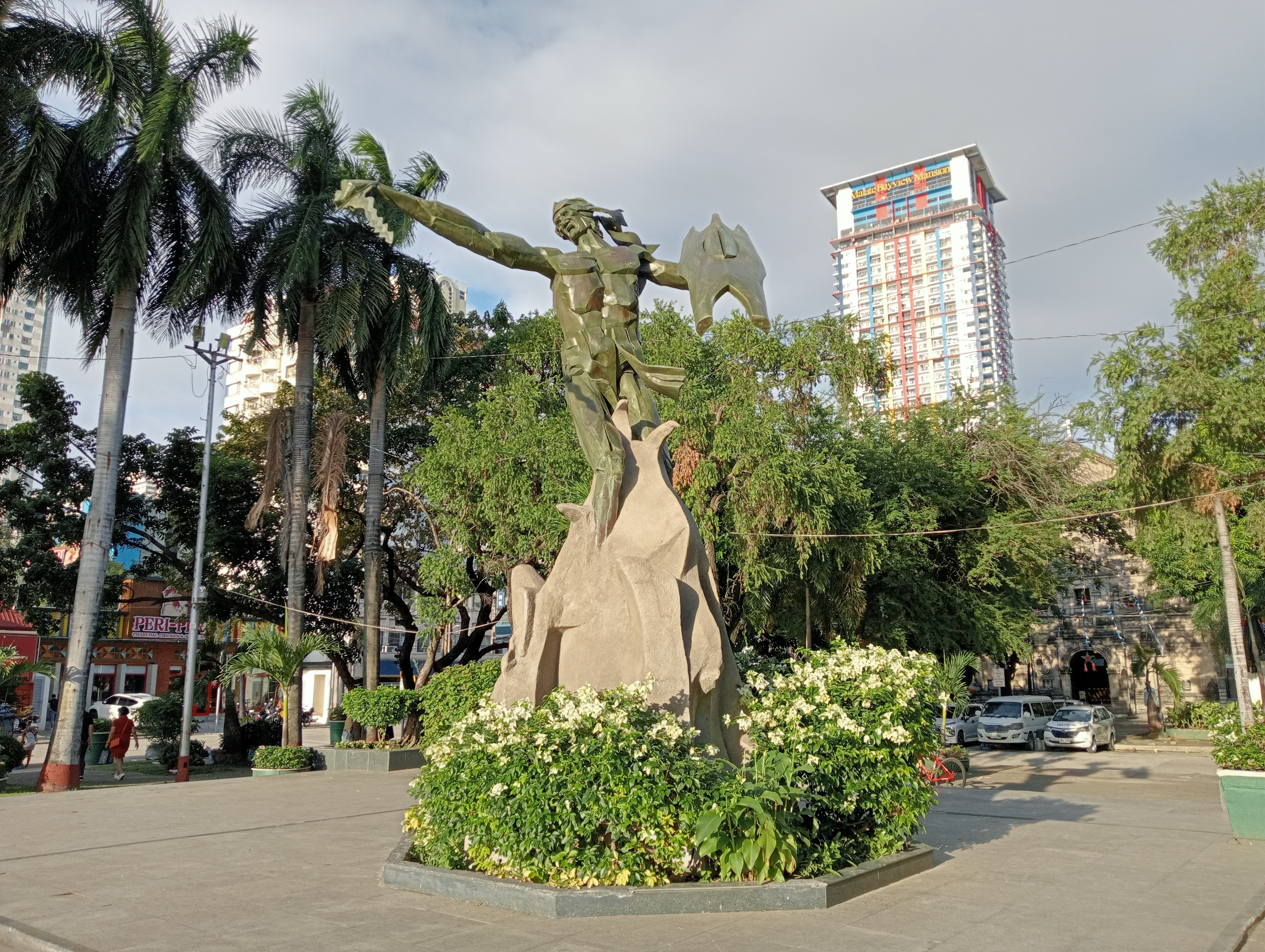
- Monument of Rajah Sulayman in Manila
- Reign: around 1570 until 1571
- Predecessor: Ache
- Successor: Monarchy abolished
- Issue: See Descendants
- House: Salalila
- Religion: Islam

Sulayman, sometimes referred to as Sulayman III (Arabic: سليمان, romanized: Sulaymān, Abecedario: Solimán) (d. 1590s), was the Crown Prince of the Kingdom of Maynila in the late 16th century and was a nephew of Raja Ache of Luzon. He was the commander of the Tagalog forces in the battle of Manila of 1570 against Spanish forces.

His palace was within the walled and fortified city of Manila. Sulayman—along with his uncle, King Ache, and Lakandula, who ruled the adjacent bayan of Tondo—was one of the three rulers who dealt with the Spanish in the battle of Manila of 1570. The Spanish described him as the most aggressive one due to his youth relative to the other two rulers. Sulayman's adoptive son, baptized Agustin de Legazpi upon conversion to Christianity, was proclaimed the sovereign ruler of Tondo upon the death of Lakandula. Legazpi, along with most of Lakandula's sons including Magat Salamat, and most of Sulayman's other adoptive sons, were executed by the Spanish after being implicated in an assembly to overturn Spanish rule in Manila in 1589. This execution helped the Spanish East Indies fortify its rule on parts of Luzon.

== Names ==
Spanish documents note that Sulayman's subjects called him Raja Mura or Raja Muda, "Young Raja", a reference to the fact that he was Raja Matanda's nephew and heir apparent. The Spaniards also called him "Raja Solimano el Mow" so his name is also often spelled as Solimán due to Spanish influence.

== Ancestry ==
According to the genealogy proposed by Mariano A. Henson in 1955, and asserted by Majul in 1973, Sulayman was the 14th Raja of Manila since it was founded as a Muslim principality in 1258 by Rajah Ahmad when he defeated the Majapahit suzerain, Raja Avirjirkaya.

== Spanish conquest of Manila (1570–1571) ==
Rajah Sulayman was the ruler of Maynila along with Rajah Matanda when the invasion of Legazpi occurred. Manila was already influenced by neighboring Southeast Asian kingdoms. The area was already an entrepot of trade from China, Siam and other places.

The Spanish explorer Miguel López de Legazpi, searching for a suitable place to establish his capital after moving from Cebu to Panay due to Portuguese claim of the archipelago, sent Martín de Goiti and Juan de Salcedo on an expedition northward to Luzon upon hearing of a prosperous kingdom there.

Goiti anchored at Cavite and established his authority by sending a "message of friendship" to the states surrounding the Pasig River. Sulayman, who had been given authority over these settlements by the ageing Rajah Matanda, was willing to accept the "friendship" from the Spaniards. However, he refused to cede his sovereignty, and had no choice but to waged war against the new arrivals' demands. As a result, Goíti and his army invaded the kingdoms in June 1570, sacking and burning the great city before returning to Panay.

== Tarik Sulayman and the Battle of Bangkusay (1571) ==
Some controversy exists about the identity of the leader of the Macabebe people that initiated the Battle of Bangkusay in 1571. That chieftain is referred to by Filipino historians as Tarik Sulayman. In some versions of the Battle of Bangkusay, Tarik Sulayman of Macabebe and Sulayman III of Manila are the same person, while other contend that they are separate individuals.

Spanish documents do not name the leader of the Macabebe Revolt, but record that he died at Bangkusay, resulting in a Macabebe retreat and Spanish victory. Sulayman III, on the other hand, is clearly recorded as participating in the Revolt of 1574, and thus cannot be the unnamed figure who died in 1571 at Bangkusay.

== The "Sulayman Revolt" (1574) ==
When López de Legazpi died in 1572, his successor, Governor-General Guido de Lavezaris, did not honour their agreements with Sulayman and Lakandula. He sequestered the properties of both kings and tolerated Spanish atrocities.

In response, Sulayman and Lakandula led a revolt in the villages of Navotas in 1574, taking advantage of the confusion brought about by the attacks of Chinese pirate Limahong. This is often referred to as the "Manila Revolt of 1574" but is sometimes referred to as the "Sulayman Revolt" and the "Lakandula Revolt." Since it involved naval forces, the Sulayman Revolt is also known as the "First Battle of Manila Bay".

Friar Gerónimo Marín and Juan de Salcedo were tasked with pursuing conciliatory talks with the kingdoms. Lakandula and Sulayman agreed to Salcedo's peace treaty and an alliance was formed between the two groups.

== Life after 1574 ==
Some accounts from the American Occupation claim that Sulayman was killed during the revolt of 1574, but this once again seems to be the result of Sulayman being confused with Tarik Sulayman of Macabebe, who had died in the previous revolt in 1571. A review of genealogical documents in the National Archives notes that Sulayman lived past the 1574 revolt, in which his son, Rahang Bago, was killed, and lived long enough to adopt the children of an unnamed sibling to be his descendants.

Sulayman is no longer mentioned in the accounts of events that took place from 1586 to 1588, which involved many members of his family.

== Descendants ==
According to Luciano P.R. Santiago's genealogical research, Sulayman married his cousin, a princess from Borneo, and they had at least two biological children: a son referred to as "Rahang Bago" ("new prince"; written as "Raxa el Vago" in the Spanish texts), and a daughter who would be baptized Doña María Laran. A legend cited by the government of Pasay in the 1950s also says Sulayman had two children: a son named Suwaboy, and a daughter, Dayang-dayang (Princess) Pasay, who would inherit from her father the lands south of Manila now known as Pasay and Parañaque. However, Rahang Bago and his cousin Lumantalan were killed by the Spanish in November 1574, in the confusion that ensued during the attack of the Chinese corsair, Limahong.

According to Santiago's research, Doña María Laran had two daughters: Doña Inés Dahitim, the elder, who married Don Miguel Banal of Quiapo; and Doña María Guinyamat, who married a Don Agustín Turingan. Luciano P.R. Santiago theorizes that Don Miguel Banal was the son of the Don Juan Banal implicated in the Tondo Conspiracy of 1587. Santiago furthers that Don Miguel Banal and Doña Inés Dahitim are said to have begotten the second Filipino to join the Augustinian Order, Fray Marcelo Banal de San Agustín.

The oral legend cited by the local government of Pasay says that Dayang-dayang Pasay married a local prince named Maytubig and settled in the place called Balite. The legend says that they had a daughter named Dominga Custodio, who grew up to donate all her lands to the Augustinians just before her death.

Santiago, however, claims that aside from his biological children, Sulayman had descendants by adoption. Santiago's genealogical research suggests that Sulayman had at least one male sibling, unnamed in the records, and who had died prior to the death of Rahang Bago in 1574. Sulayman chose to adopt the sons of this sibling, who were identified in records as Agustin de Legazpi, Don Gabriel Taumbasan, and Don Jerónimo Bassi. All three adopted children of Sulayman participated in the Tondo Conspiracy of 1587, and only Taumbasan was not executed, having instead been exiled in Mexico for four years.

== Others ==
According to Meranau history, he is part of this list of rulers:

- Rajah Sulayman
- Rajah Indarafatra
- Rajah Umaka'an

== Legacy ==
In Rizal Park in Manila is a statue of Rajah Sulayman as a hero against Spanish invasion. Rajah Soliman Science and Technology High School in Binondo, Manila – one of two science high schools – is named after him.

== See also ==
- Agustin de Legazpi
- Maginoo
- Rajah
- Sultan
- Datu
- Lakan
- Philippine revolts against Spain
- Lacandola Documents

Rajah Sulayman House of Salalila Born: mid-16th century Died: after 1589
Regnal titles
Preceded by Rajah Matanda	Rajah of Maynila as co-ruler around 1570 onwards 1570-1571	Title abolished Manila founded as the capital of the Spanish East Indies
