= Tarik Sulayman =

Kapampangan commander

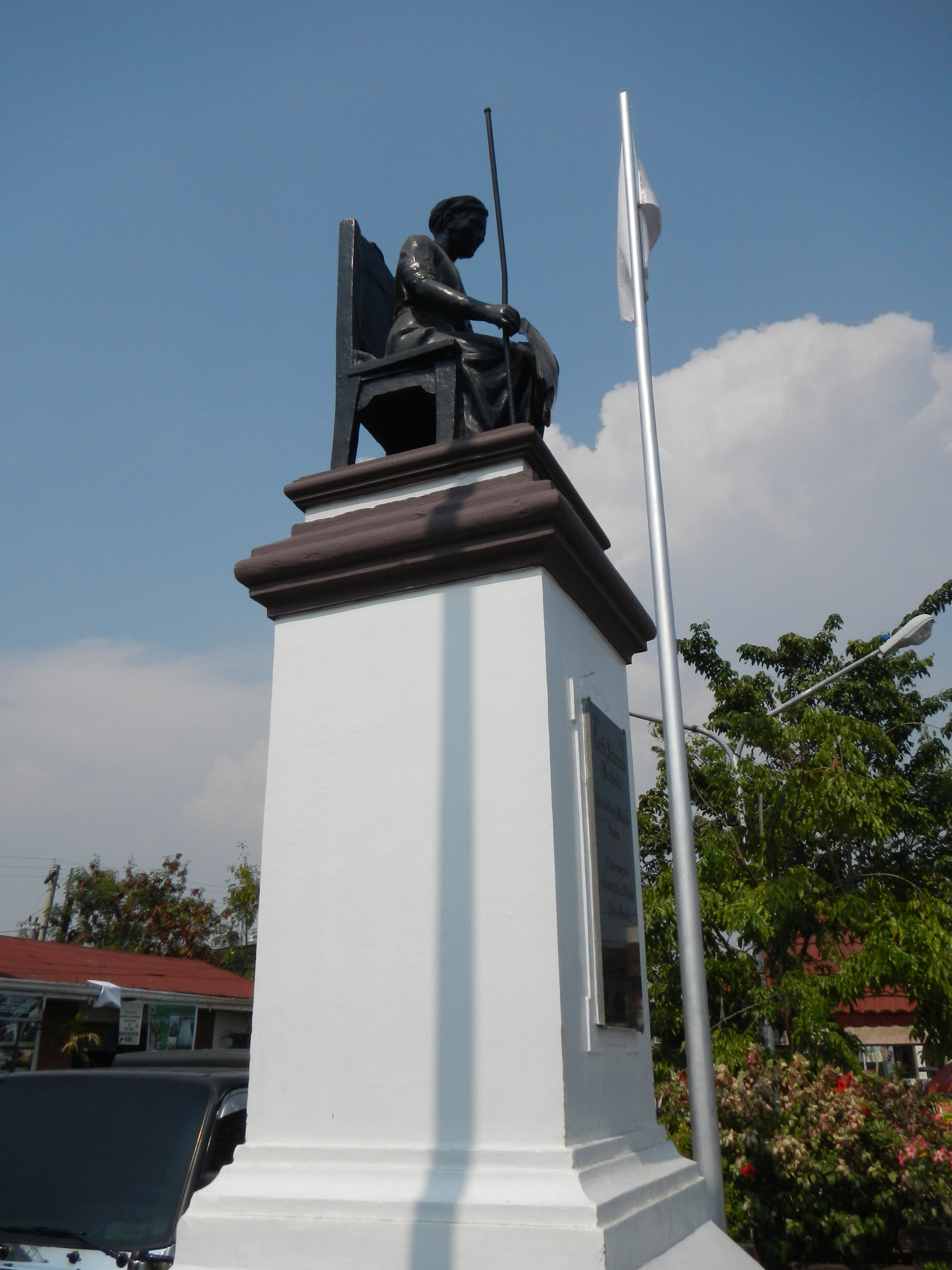
Tarik Sulayman Monument in Macabebe, Pampanga

Tarik Sulayman, also spelled Tarik Soliman (from Arabic طارق سليمان Tāriq Sulaiman), is the most popular of several names attributed by Kapampangan historians to the individual that led the forces of Macabebe against the Spanish forces of Miguel López de Legazpi during the Battle of Bangkusay Channel on June 3, 1571. Aside from "Tarik Sulayman", this individual has also been associated with the names Bambalito or Bankau by some historians, while others simply consider him "nameless."

== Biography ==
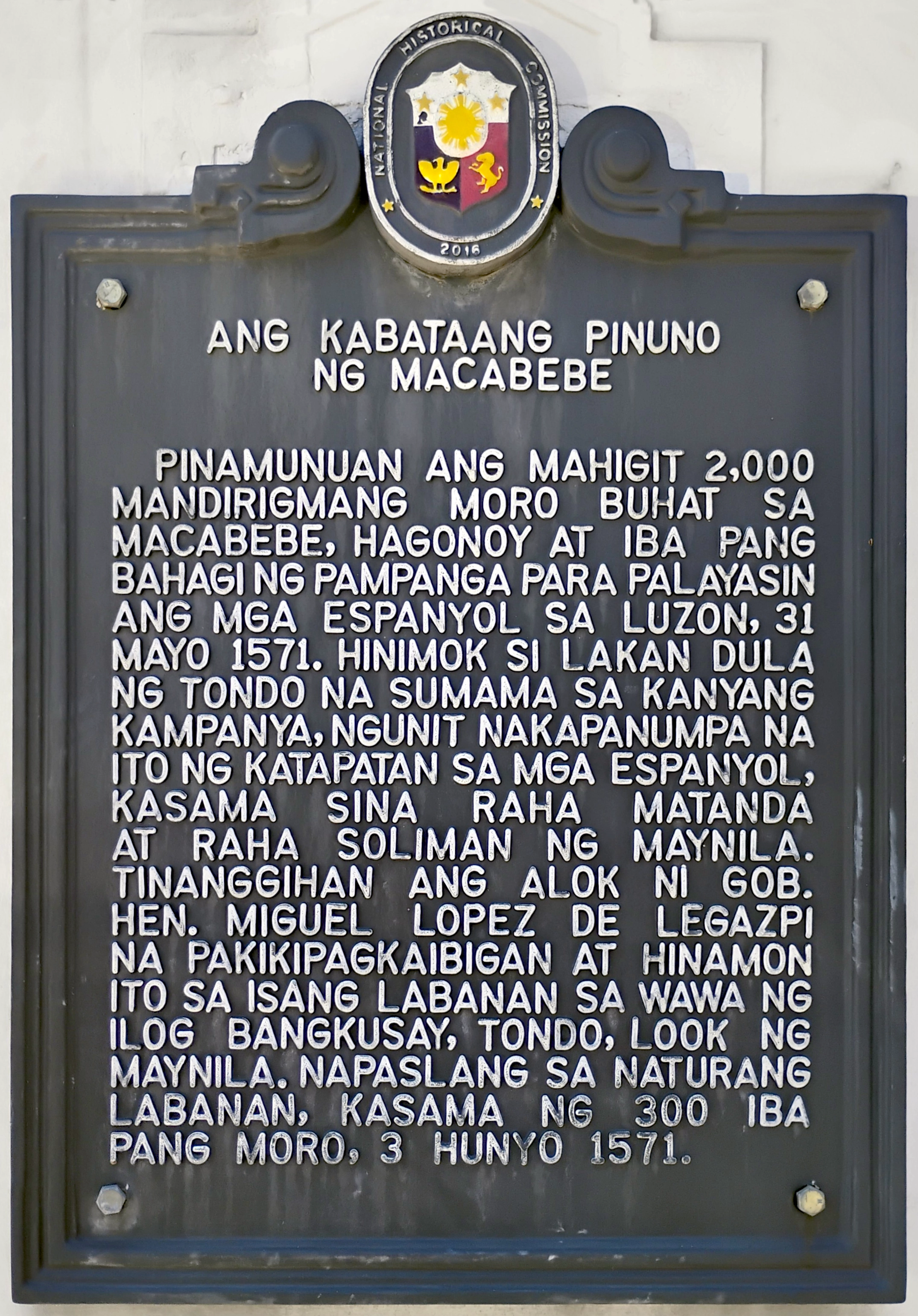
National historical marker installed in 2016 in Macabebe

The Spanish records do not identify that individual by name, so the attribution of the name Tarik Sulayman is based on genealogical records presented by the leader's supposed Kapampangan descendants during the 19th century.

The Battle of Bangkusay happened because he refused to ally with the Spaniards as Lakandula had done, decided to mount an attack on the Spaniards, massing his forces at Bangkusay Channel. López de Legazpi got word of the impending attack and launched a preemptive strike. The Macabebe forces were defeated, and Tarik Sulayman himself was killed.

The Spanish victory at Bangkusay and López de Legazpi's friendship with Lakandula enabled the Spaniards to establish themselves throughout the city and its neighboring towns.

== Controversy ==
Some controversy exists about whether Tarik Sulayman of Macabebe, and Rajah Sulayman of Manila were the same person. This is presented to be the case in some versions of the Battle of Bangkusay, but Kapampangan historians insist that the two were different individuals who are often confused with one another because of their names. Some have even suggested that the two men were related.

In any case, the Spanish records do not identify the leader of the Macabebe forces by name, but they do record that he died during the Battle of Bangkusay, resulting in a Macabebe retreat and a Spanish Victory. Rajah Sulayman of Manila, on the other hand, is clearly recorded as participating in the 1574 Manila revolt. This data reinforces the theory that the two are completely different men, as the Spanish clearly knew who is Rajah Sulayman of Manila, and that they did not use his name when writing about Tarik Sulayman of Macabebe.
