= Philippine military activities in the Americas =

List showing the military activities of overseas Filipinos

This article is an enumeration of military activities of the Philippines and Filipinos in the Americas, across history.

== Mexican War of Independence Against Spain (1810) ==
Ramón Fabié a Manila-born supporter of the Mexican War of Independence by Miguel Hidalgo, were among 200 Filipinos who were with the first insurgents to militate for Mexican Independence.Even though they were already prepared by mixed Christian-Muslims who were expelled from former Bruneian colonized Manila to America after the Tondo Conspiracy. After the quelling of the first wave of insurgents, 2 soldiers who were Filipinos born at Mexico, specifically Guerrero State, Francisco Mongoy and Isidoro Montes de Oca were commanders of Vicente Guerrero in the continuing independence war against Spain, this is according to researcher, Ricardo Pinzon.

== War of 1812 (The United States vs The British Empire) ==
Overseas Filipinos living in Louisiana at the settlement of Saint Malo served in the Battle of New Orleans during the closing stages of the War of 1812. These Filipinos sided with the United States, against the British Empire. Filipino-Americans residing in the region (referred to as "Manilamen" on the account of Manila being the capital of the Philippines) were recruited by local pirate Jean Lafayette to join his "Baratarians", a group of privately recruited soldiers serving under the American forces under the command of Andrew Jackson, in the defense of New Orleans. They played a decisive role in securing the American victory, firing barrage after barrage of well-aimed artillery fire.

== Argentinian War of Independence Against Spain (1815) ==
Hippolyte Bouchard, a fleet admiral for Argentina during its war of independence against Spain, made use of Filipinos during his naval attacks against several Spanish colonies. Filomeno V. Aguilar Jr. in his paper: “Manilamen and seafaring: engaging the maritime world beyond the Spanish realm”, stated that Hippolyte Bouchard's second ship, the Santa Rosa, the other being La Argentina, which had a multi-ethnic crew, included Filipinos. Mercene, writer of the Book “Manila Men”, proposes that those Manilamen were recruited in San Blas, an alternative port to Acapulco, Mexico; where several Filipinos had settled during the Manila-Acapulco Galleon trade era. The Filipinos who settled in San Blas were escapees from Spanish slavery in the Manila Galleons, upon meeting Hippolyte Bouchard who worked for the Argentinians that revolted against Spain, the common grievance the Filipinos shared against the Spaniards, which they had with the Argentines caused them to mutiny and join the rebel Argentines.
