= Lakandula =

Lakan of Tondo

- Lakan of Tondo
- Reign: Before 1570–1575
- Successor: Agustin de Legazpi
- Full name: ᜊᜓᜈᜏ᜔ᜎᜃᜈ᜔ᜇᜓᜎ; Bunao Lakan Dula
- Died: 1575
- Noble family: Tondo
- Issue: Dionisio Capulong; Magat Salamat; Phelipe Salonga; Maria Poloin; Martin Lacandola; Luis Taclocmao (sometimes referred to as Luis Salugmoc)

Lakandula (Baybayin: ᜎᜃᜈ᜔ᜇᜓᜎ, Spanish orthography: Lacandola) was the title of the last lakan or paramount ruler of pre-colonial Tondo when the Spaniards first conquered the lands of the Pasig River delta in the Philippines in the 1570s.

The firsthand account of Spanish Royal Notary Hernando Riquel says that he introduced himself to the Spanish as "Sibunao Lacandola". While his given name has since been interpreted as being "Bunao", the historic meaning of the word Lakan, was a title equivalent to prince or paramount ruler, meaning he was the principal Datu or Prince of his domain.

Along with Rajah Matanda and Rajah Sulayman, Bunao Lakandula (or Lakan of Tondo), was one of three rulers who played significant roles in the Spanish conquest of the Pasig River delta polities during the earliest days of the Philippines under Spanish colonial period.

While it is questionable whether "Lakandula" represented a single titular name during his own lifetime, a few of his descendants in the first few generations after his death came to refer to themselves as the "Lakandula of Tondo", taking that name on as a noble title.

== Name and title ==
Over time, the Lakandula's name has come to be written in several ways. However, according to the firsthand account written in Spanish by Hernando Riquel, the royal notary who accompanied Miguel López de Legazpi, the Lord of Tondo specifically identified himself as "Sibunao Lacandola, lord of the town of Tondo" when he boarded Legazpi's ship with the lords of Manila on May 18, 1571. According to Riquel, the lords of Manila introduced themselves as "Rajah Ache the Old and Rajah Soliman the Young, lords and principals of the town of Manila"

In page 13 of "Cracks in the Parchment Curtain", preeminent historian William Henry Scott quotes Riquel's original text, which he found in the Spanish archives under "Archivo General de Indias Seccion Patronato leg. 24, no 24." The relevant part of the text read:

...declaracion llamarse Raha Ache el Viejo y Raha Solimane el Mozo, senores y principales del pueblo de Manila, y Sibunao Lacandola, principal del pueblo de Tondo...(emphasis added)

Modern historians routinely remove the Filipino word "si", a grammatical article that precede personal names, from recorded names during this era because Spanish writers had not yet learned the local languages and often mistakenly included "si-" in Filipino names. Sibunao thus should be interpreted as "[Ako] si Bunao" = "[I am] Bunao". Historians thus take this to mean that the Lakan introduced himself as "Bunao Lakandula." At the time, Lakandula was assumed to be a regnal name, but as noted below, it was actually his title.

=== Etymology of "Lakandula" ===
His title "Lakan" denoted a "paramount ruler" (or more specifically, "paramount datu") of one of the large coastal settlements (known as a "bayan" or "large barangay") of the Tagalog people.

In its current Tagalog form, means "gentleman".

Another common variation of the name is Gat Dula (alternatively spelled as a single word, Gatdula). Historically, the prefix Gat, a shortened version of the Tagalog honorific "Pamagat", meant "nobleman." Hence, Gatdula would literally read "Nobleman of the Palace", meaning essentially the same thing as the Kapampangan version, Lakandula.

This leaves the matter of the addendum "dula" to be settled. While this could not have been a family name such as Filipinos use today, this may not be a satisfactory explanation, since static family names were introduced to the Filipino culture much later, by a decree issued by Governor General Narciso Clavería y Zaldúa on November 11, 1849. Alternatively, rather than a surname per se, Dula may have referred to a family group or clan, but there does not neem to be any historical evidence to support this postulation. Historian Jose N. Sevilla y Tolentino, theorized that "Dula" was not a personal name at all, but a local word that meant something akin to "Palace". While he may not have ruled from a literal palace, this would have indicated the Lakan's seat of power. As such, the "Lakandula" would have been the local language title for the "Lord of the Palace" and ruler of Tondo. Analogously, contemporary Rajah Ache was referred to as Rajah Matanda (Old Rajah), while Rajah Sulayman was sometimes referred to as Rajah Muda or Rajamora (Young Rajah).

Historians such as Dery and Scott explain that his given name was Bunaw, but they also continue to refer to him by his title, Lakandula or "the" Lakandula. On the other hand, Joaquin explains that the Lakan's given name was Bunaw, and proceeds to call him Lakan Dula (separate words) or "the" Lakan Dula throughout his "Manila, My Manila" manuscript. In any case, many contemporary historians continue to ignore the fact that Lakan was a title, and refer to the last Lakan of Dula (or Lakan of Tondo) as "Lakandula" as if it had been his name. All things considered, the most accurate way to style the historical person's name and title would be "Bunao, Lakandula" or "the Lakan of Tondo".

=== "Lakan" instead of "Rajah" ===
While he has been erroneously referred to as Rajah Lakandula, the terms "Rajah" and "Lakan" actually have practically the same meaning. In Tondo, the native Lakan title was used, making the use of both "Rajah" and "Lakandula" at the same time both redundant and erroneous. and Filipino historian and national artist for literature Nick Joaquin takes pains to point out that the term Lakan, not Rajah, was used by the rulers of Tondo.

== Life before the arrival of the Spaniards ==
Little is known about the early life of Bunaw, Lakan Dula, before the arrival of Legazpi. According to National Artist Nick Joaquin "he is presumed to be of native birth," with mixed Sinaunang Tagalog (Dumagat) and Kapampangan ancestry. Joaquin adds that "He was said to be a descendant of King Balagtas."

Joaquin further speculates on the Lakandula's religious beliefs:

"Tondo's Lakan Dula may have been unusual in being neither foreign nor Muslim. This was indicated by his use of the native term Lakan instead of the foreign [Muslim] title Rajah. Lakandula can be presumed . . . to have been reared in the anito cults. One guess is that he converted to Islam, then changed his mind and returned to his native faith."

Joaquin also expounds on the economic context of the Lakandula's reign over Tondo:

"Tondo had replaced Namayan as the chief port of entry on Manila Bay. Tondo was right on the seaside. This was the advantage it had over Namayan, which was upriver inland. So the merchant ships that came into the bay preferred to unload their goods at the port of Tondo. And now it was the king of Tondo who was responsible for sending the merchandise upriver to the lakeside communities, there to be traded for local products. Tondo was thus the distributing center, or entrepot, on the delta... At the time of [the last] Lakan [in the 1570s], Tondo was at the height of its career as an entrepot...."

According to Scott (1982), when ships from China arrived at Manila Bay, the Lakandula would remove the sails and rudders of their ships until they paid him duties and anchorage fees, and then he would then buy up all their goods himself, paying half its value immediately and then paying the other half upon their return the following year. In the interim, he would trade these goods with peoples further upstream, the end result being that other locals were not able to buy anything from the Chinese directly, but only through the Lakandula, who made a considerable profit as a result.

William Henry Scott notes that Augustinian Fray Martin de Rada Legaspi reported that the Tagalogs were "more traders than warriors", and elsewhere notes that Maynila's ships got their goods from Tondo and then dominated trade through the rest of the archipelago. People in other parts of the archipelago often referred to Maynila's boats as "Chinese" (Sina or Sinina) because they came bearing Chinese goods.

== Arrival of Legazpi, May 1571 ==
When Miguel Lopez de Legazpi arrived at Manila Bay in May 1571, the Lakandula was there to meet him. The two first met on May 17, the day after Legazpi's arrival on the bay, when Rajah Matanda and Lakandula boarded Legazpi's ship to discuss terms with him. Part of these discussions specified that the Spaniards would not land in Tondo, and would instead land in Manila, which had been burned to the ground the year before. Joaquin suggests that Lakandula would "have seen that Legaspi was being practical. Burned down and emptied, Maynila would be a better spot to fortify, being more strategic." In fact, Manila was not conquered, but it was occupied through a peace pact that joined Legazpi and the three kings: the Lakandula, the (older) Rajah Ache and the (younger) Rajah Sulayman.

On May 18, 1571, the native nobility of Luzon, Rajah Sulayman, Rajah Matanda, and Lakandula, acknowledged the sovereignty of Spain over the islands and proclaimed themselves to be vassals of Spain. On the following day, May 19, Legazpi landed in Manila and took ceremonial possession of the land in the presence of Soliman, Matanda, and Lakandula.

Lakandula helped establish a house for Legazpi and build a fort for the Spaniards, giving them fourteen pieces of artillery and twelve jars of gunpowder, a gift much appreciated by the Spaniards, who were running low on ammunition.

Soon after, the Lakandula and his sons were baptized as Catholics. Bunao Lakandula took on the name "Don Carlos Lacandola" after Charles I of Spain. To celebrate the event, the Spanish discharged Manila's artillery and arquebuses as part of the ceremony.

== The Battle of Bangkusay, June 1571 ==
When the Spaniards first came to Manila they were kindly accepted, but over time the natives understood that it had meant subservience to them. It was not long before Spanish power in Luzon was challenged. A first battle took place on May 24, 1570, where the natives were defeated. A month later, Tarik Sulayman of Macabebe attacked Manila, convincing Rajah Sulayman to join the battle against Legazpi. Macabebe and Sulayman's forces were defeated, and the Datu of Macabebe was killed in what history would record as the Battle of Bangkusay Channel. (The similarity of names has caused some confusion between these two leaders, but Tarik Sulayman and Rajah Sulayman were different individuals – one survived the battle, and the other did not.)

Lakandula had refused to join Macabebe and Sulayman's coalition, but among the prisoners taken by the Spaniards after the battle were two of his nephews and a number of his officers. When questioned, they said that they had been on the scene only as observers, not as combatants. Legazpi let them go to demonstrate his confidence in Lakandula.

Joaquin notes that this was a wise choice on Legazpi's part:

"If he had been playing a double game before, Lakandula now became earnest in supporting the Spanish. It may be he who persuaded the fugitive Soliman to surrender and return to the good graces of Legazpi."

== Expedition to Pampanga and Bulacan, late 1571 ==
Later that year, Legazpi sent Martin de Goiti to spread Spanish rule to the peoples of what are now the provinces of Bulacan and Pampanga, particularly the territories of Lubao with Macabebe, Guagua on September 14, 1571. One month later they conquered Calumpit and Malolos in November 14 of the same year. Legazpi conceded these settlements under Spanish rule. He sent Lakandula and Sulayman with him, because, as one account has it, "if so great a chief should go with him, when the Tagalogs and Pampangos saw that he had given obedience to His Majesty, they would give it also."

The account continues:

"Lacandola agreed to go, and served with two ships provided at his cost, and distinguished himself by performing much service for His Majesty, and went along so the said Pampangos would give him obedience, as in fact they did."

These boats were joangas (karakoa), a type of seacraft capable of carrying 300 men each, which, as Dery points out, were common in Maritime Southeast Asia.

== Attack by Limahong, 1574 ==
Lakandula's close association with the Spaniards continued despite Legazpi's death on August 20, 1572, and his replacement as governor by Guido de Lavezares, who had been the colony's treasurer. The possession of the Islands was unsuccessfully disputed by a rival expedition under the command of Limahong, a Chinese pirate, who had been outlawed by the Celestial Emperor of China. Lakandula was on hand to help repel Limahong when he came to try and sack Manila in 1574. Lakandula was able to raise a rebellion against the Spaniards. The natives of Mindoro Island revolted too but all these disorders were solved by a detachment of soldiers.

== Death ==
Mentions of Lakandula's death are few, but Scott indicates that he died in 1575, "three years after" Legazpi and Rajah Matanda, who both died in 1572.

Lakandula's role as ruler of Tondo was then taken up by his grandnephew, and Rajah Soliman's adopted son, Agustin de Legazpi.

Agustin de Legazpi, who was married to the cousin of Sultan Bolkiah, would lead Tondo as a territory under Spanish rule until he rose up against them in 1587–1588 Revolt of the Lakans, and was deposed and killed as a result.

According to Fray Gaspar de San Agustin in "Conquistas de las Islas Filipinas 1565–1615", as cited by Kimuell-Gabriel (2013), Lakandula had ruled Tondo from an elevated site near Manila bay, facing the shore and fronted by fishermen's dwellings. According to local oral histories, this site eventually became the site of the Sto Niño of Tondo Parish church.

== Documentary sources ==
Primary documentary sources about Lakandula are sparse, so much so that there has been debate about the actual name of the Lakan. Dery identifies three types of sources regarding Lakandula:

- direct accounts of Legazpi's 1571 conquest, and indirect references from other documents of the period;
- a record group in the Philippine National Archives collectively referred to as the "Lacandola Documents" containing mostly 18th-century genealogical documents; and
- folklore, which "suggests prior lineage where documentation definitively identifies only descendants".

=== Direct accounts and references from period documents ===
In his "Bibliographic Essay" at the end of his book Barangay: Sixteenth Century Philippine Culture and Society, William Henry Scott identifies the three accounts directly detailing the events of Lakandula's lifetime:

- An account written by Miguel Lopez de Legazpi himself;
- An account by royal notary Hernando Riquel who was part of Legazpi's expedition; and
- a third account which is anonymous, but which Scott suggests is probably written by royal notary Hernando Riquel.

Scott singles this third account out as particularly useful, because it includes careful observations of the islands and people contacted.

Scott also identifies other accounts that do not directly refer to that occasion, but provide additional information about conditions at the time. These include two accounts of the Magellan voyage, reports from the attacks on Borneo in 1578–1579, letters to the king from royal auditor Melchor de Avalos, Reports by later Governors General, passing details in sworn testimony about Augustinian activities (the latter two recorded in Blair and Robertson), Correspondence of Augustinian Fray Martin de Rada, the Relacion accounts of Miguel de Loarca and Juan de Plasencia, and the Boxer Codex, which "can be dated to 1590 on internal evidence."

== Descendants ==
=== Children ===
His descendants are spread out all across the Kapampangan region during the Spanish colonial era. Genealogical research by Filipino historian Luciano P. R. Santiago indicate that Lakandula fathered at least five children:

- Don Dionisio Capulong, the Datu of Candaba, the eldest son of Lakandula;
- Don Magat Salamat, who would later rule Tondo with his cousin Agustin de Legazpi after Lakandula died, and who was then executed by the Spanish in 1588 for his role in the Revolt of the Lakans;
- Don Felipe Salonga, the Datu of Pulu;
- Doña Maria Poloin, his only historically recorded daughter, who married Don Juan Alonso Talabos; and
- Don Martin Lakandula who entered the Augustinian Order as a lay brother in 1590.

Other documentary sources also mention a "Don Luis Taclocmao" (or "Salugmoc"), a supposed son Lakandula of who was killed in the 1603 Chinese rebellion, fighting the Chinese rebels.

=== Other relations ===
Local folk legends recount that Mexico-born conquistador Juan de Salcedo fell in love with an 18-year-old noblewoman called "Dayang-dayang Kandarapa", who was said to be the niece of Lakandula.

=== Later descendants ===
In 1990, Filipino historian Luciano P. R. Santiago wrote an article for the Philippine Quarterly of Culture and Society which details the identities and life stories of some of the descendants of Lakandula, mostly based on the "Lacandola Documents," a collection of legal documents held by the Philippine National Archives. Another Filipino historian, Luis Camara Dery, in his 2001 book "A History of the Inarticulate", notes that a purported 1539 document called the "Will of Fernando Malang Balagtas," which, although its exact provenance has been determined to be doubtful, corroborates the information from the Lacandola documents. The Lacandola of Arayat came from one of the grandchildren of Lakandula of Tondo named Dola, who is from San Luis, Pampanga. When Dola married, she insisted to use the surname Lacandola for her children to maintain connection with his grandfather from Tondo and partly, to hide from Spanish authorities.She was married to a Spanish mestizo surnamed Reyes. Eventually, the Reyes-Lacandola was married into a Macapagal.

Dery, Scott, and Santiago recount that the privileges accorded to the descendants of Lakandula had been discontinued for a while in the aftermath of Lakandula's death, because some of the descendants came into conflict with the Spanish authorities. According to Dery, the Balagtas document recounts that these privileges were restored when a Juan Macapagal, who claimed to be a great grandson of Lakandula (through Dionisio Capulong's son Juan Gonzalo Capulong), aided the Spanish authorities in suppressing the 1660 Maniago revolt, the 1660-1661 Malong revolt, and the 1661 Almazan revolt, performing his role as Master-of-Camp and Datu of Arayat.

In 1758, A Gremio de Lakandulas was created to safeguard the rights and privileges of the Kapampangan descendants of Lakandula as assured by the Spanish crown. During the British invasion of 1762–1764, the descendants of Lakandula, concentrated in the province of Pampanga, formed a company of volunteers to fight the British and were granted autonomy by Governor General Simon de Anda.

Macapagal (rare variant: Makapagal) is a Filipino surname derived from the Kapampangan language. By Santiago's genealogical reckoning, prominent Lakandula descendants of the 20th century include the former Philippine Presidents Diosdado Macapagal and Gloria Macapagal Arroyo, former Philippine Senate President Jovito Salonga, international stage celebrity Lea Salonga, pioneer Filipino industrialist Gonzalo Puyat, and former Philippine Senate President Gil Puyat.

== Legacy ==
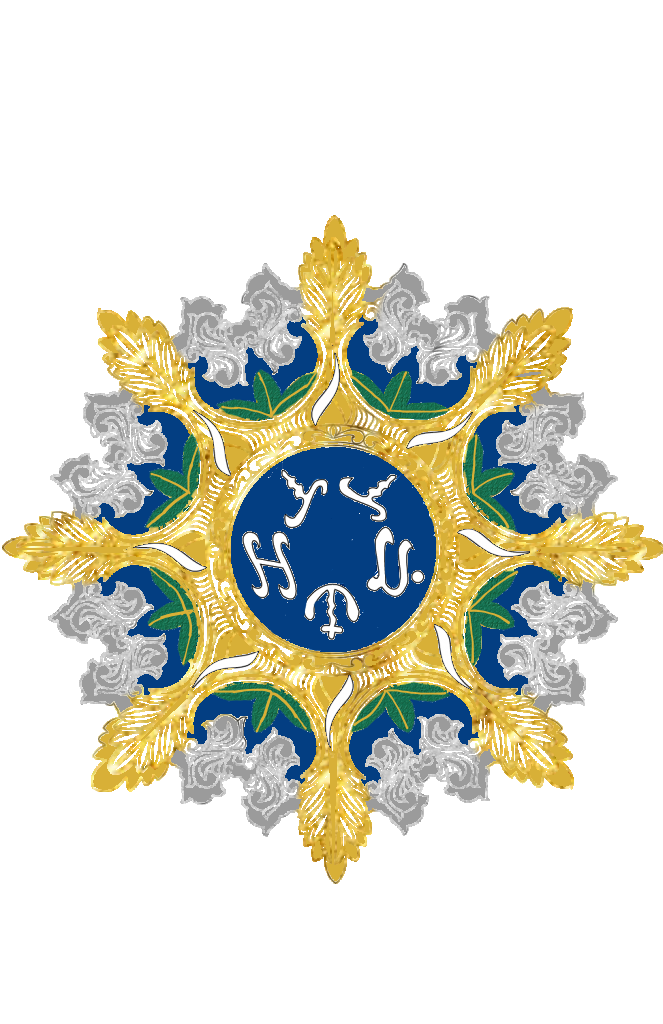
The insignia of the Order of Lakandula

- The Order of Lakandula is one of the highest honors given by the Republic of the Philippines. It is an order of political and civic merit, awarded in memory of Lakandula's dedication to the responsibilities of leadership, prudence, fortitude, courage and resolve in the service of one's people.
- The BRP Rajah Lakandula (PF-4) was the destroyer escort / frigate and is the only ex-USN Edsall-class destroyer escort that served the Philippine Navy. It was also the flagship of the Philippine Navy from 1981 to 1988. Struck from the Navy List in 1988, it was still in use as a stationary barracks ship in Subic Bay as of 1999.
- A number of Lakandula elementary and secondary schools are named after Lakandula, notably in the City of Manila, and the Province of Pampanga, both closely associated with Banaw Lakandula.

== See also ==
- Tondo (historical polity)
- Rajah Sulayman
- Rajah Matanda
- Maynila (historical polity)
- Rajah
- Sultan
- Datu
- Lakan
- History of the Philippines
- History of the Philippines (900–1521)
- Philippine revolts against Spain

Regnal titles
Preceded by Rajah Matanda	Lakan of Tondo; Early 16th century–1571	Succeeded by Rajah Sulayman
