= Lacandola Documents =

Group of Philippine genealogical records

The term "Lakan Dula Documents" is used by Philippine historiographers to describe the section of the Spanish Archives in Manila which are dedicated to the genealogical records (cuadernos de linaje) of the Manila and Tondo aristocracy. As of 2001, only one bundle of twelve folders (containing eleven distinct sets of documents) remains in the archive, the rest having been lost, misplaced, or destroyed by various events such as the Japanese Occupation of Manila during World War II. The surviving bundle is labeled "Decendientes de Don Carlos Lacandola" ('Descendants of Don Carlos Lacandola'), and scholars use the term "Lacandola Documents" as an informal shortcut.

Scholars specializing in the noble houses of Rajah Matanda, Rajahmuda, and Lakandula mostly use these documents in conjunction with the Archivo General de Indias (General Archive of the Indies) in Seville, Spain in studying the genealogies of these "noble houses." Other primary sources frequently referred to by historiographers are the Silsila or Tarsilas of Sulu, Maguindanao, and Brunei, and local records (usually Catholic parish registers) of towns where descendants of the three houses may have moved.

== Contents ==
| Folder Number | Title or Topic | Relevant Dates | Notes |
|---|---|---|---|
| I | Royal ordinary provision for the mayor of the province of Bulacan to summon the rulers Lakan Dula and Raja Sulayman so that within 30 days they appear in this royal court to present the requests they express within. [Real provision ordinaria para que alcalde mayor de la provincia de Bulacan cite y emplaze de los regulos Lacandola y Raja Soliman para que dentro de 30 diaz comparezcan en esta Real Audiencia a presentar los recaudos que dentro expresan.] | 1740–1754 | Santiago (1990) notes that this folder contains missing pages. |
| II | The following: Testimony of the royal sentence delivered in the judicial proceedings by the prosecutor against the descendants of the rulers Lakan Dula, Raja Sulayman, and Raja Matanda on the extent and intelligence of the tax reserves that by different lord governors have been granted to those referred to (broken) from the list of reserved descendants of the aforementioned.; [Testimonio de la Real sentencia librada en los autos sequidos por el Sr. Fiscal contra los desciendentes de los Regulos Lacandola, Raja Soliman y Ladia Matanda sobre la extension e inteligencia de las reservas de tributos que por diferentes Sres. Governadores se hand concedidio a los referidos con (roto) de la lista de los reservados descendientes de los susodichos.]; With history of the tribute reserves of said descendants.; [Con historia de las reservas de tributos de dichos descendientes.]; Investigation procedures of the descendants of the three brothers Don Juan, Don Manuel, and Don Miguel Lapira Macapagal which have been carried out in accordance with the royal sentence.; [Diligencias de averiguacion de los descendientes de los tres hermanos D. Juan, D. Manuel y D. Miguel Lapira Macapagal que se ha practicado en conformidad de la real sentencia.] | 1758; 1751–1758; 1758–1759 | Santiago (1990) notes that this folder contains missing pages. |
| III | Testimonio literal de la reserva de tributos, polos y servicios personales y demas contribuciones generales y particulares concedida a los descendientes por linea recta del Regulo Lacandola. | 1779–1758 (Pampanga) | Santiago (1990) notes that this folder contains missing pages. |
| IV-A | Part 1 of Representacion del comun de tributatnes del pueblo de San Simon en Pampanga contra los descendiented del Regulo Lacandola sobre per juicios. | 1787–1793 | |
| IV-B | Part 2 of Representacion del comun de tributantes del pueblo de San Simon en Pampanga contra los descendiented del Regulo Lacandola sobre per juicios. | 1787–1793 | |
| V | Peticion de Manuel de los Reyes marido de Patricia Lacandola sobre para que le disfrute de la reserva de tributos, polos y servicios personales, privilegios, que estan concedidos a la familia de los Lacandola. | 1816–1829 | |
| VI | Peticion de Zacarias Naquit del pueblo de Binondo para que se le conceda las gracias y privilegios que estan concedidos a la familia de los Lacandola por ser descendiented de ellos. | 1828–1829 | |
| VII | Documentos de los descendientes de Lacandola en las provincias de Tayabas, Nueva Ecija, y Pampanga. | 1830–1834 | Untitled document – the name used here is the label of the folder. |
| VIII | Expediente sobre extension del impuesto y prestacion personal a favor de los descendiented de Don Carlos Lacandola. | 1883–1885 (Pampanga) | |
| IX | Testimonio del expediente instruido a solicitud de Francisa de Los Reyes Lacandola, casado de Miguel Polintan, residente del pueblo de la Hermita estramuros de esta capital. | 1841–1842 | |
| X | Documentos de Don Pedro Macapagal Mallari Lacandola del pueblo de San Simon, provincia de Pampanga y Don Mariano Punzalan Mallari Vergara Lacandola del pueblo de Apalit, de la misma provincia. | 1882–1883 | Untitled document – the name used here is the label of the folder. |
| XI | Documentos de Don Francisco Siongco Soliman (Descendiente de Raja Soliman) | 1661–1666 (Mexico, Pampanga) | Untitled document – the name used here is the label of the folder. |

== See also ==
- Paramount rulers in early Philippine history
- Rajahnate of Maynila
- Tondo (historical polity)
- Rajah Matanda
- Rajah Sulayman
- Lakandula
- Agustin de Legaspi
- Magat Salamat
