= Tondo Conspiracy =

Planned Filipino uprising against Spain

Conspiracy of the Maginoos
Date	1587–1588
Location	Manila, Philippines
Result	Plot discovered: Centralization of the Spanish colonial government; Tondo dissolved and became a direct territory under the Spanish Empire

Belligerents
Tondo: Tagalog maginoos	Spanish Empire: Spanish encomenderos

Commanders and leaders
Agustin de Legazpi (executed); Magat Salamat (executed)	Santiago de Vera; Pedro Sarmiento

The Tondo Conspiracy of 1587, popularly known as the Conspiracy of the Maginoos (Spanish: La Conspiración de las Maginoos), also known as the Revolt of the Lakans, was a revolt planned by Tagalog nobles known as maginoos, led by Don Agustin de Legazpi of Tondo and his cousin Martin Pangan, to overthrow the Spanish government in the Philippines due to injustices against the Filipinos. It was territorially one of the largest conspiracies against Spanish rule next to the Katipunan. It ranged from provinces near Manila all the way to the Calamianes Islands near Palawan.

Legazpi sought help from a Japanese sea captain named Juan Gayo who was a Christian and asked for arms and warriors to fight alongside them in exchange for one-half of the tributes collected in the Philippines. They also requested help from places such as Borneo, Laguna, and Batangas with a plan to assault the city of Manila and assassinate the Spaniards. However, their plan was discovered by the Spaniards when Magat Salamat revealed their plan to fellow rebel Antonio Surabao, who turned out to be a traitor when he reported the conspiracy to the Spaniards. Consequently, the rebels associated with the conspiracy were punished, with some being put to death and others being exiled. The plot against the Spaniards died alongside them.

== Background ==
=== Cause for the revolt ===
Numerous datus were not in favor of the Spanish rule as they had conflicting interests with regard to authority and freedom. An instance of such is the waning obedience of the slaves to the datus. This was brought about by the initiatives of the Spaniards to abolish slavery in hopes of shifting the slaves' allegiance from the datus to the kingly Spaniards. Furthermore, this elimination of slavery had institutionalized how the slaves were obligated to pay their tributes to the Spaniards instead of the datus. They had been reduced to vassalage, thus the plan of rebellion of the datus against the Spaniards.

=== Conspirators ===
Martin Pangan, who was accused of adultery, Agustin de Legazpi, who was accused of not paying fees as governor of Tondo (his Bruneian Muslim name before Baptism to Catholicism was Rajah Muhammad Zahir al-Din), Gabriel Tuambasan, and Pitonggatan all met in jail, where they made a pact of the datus to aid each other in times of need and hardship. They also made a pact to stand united against the Spaniards, though they did not know in which manner yet.

After they got out of jail, Martin Pangan (who was exiled from Tondo) went to live in a village in Tambobong (known today as Malabon), where he, along with Legazpi, planned a secret meeting. They reached out to the datus of Pandacan, Navotas, Taguig, Maysilo, Catangalan, and many others in the Manila area and of nearby provinces such as Candaba, Pampanga who had been thinking of starting an uprising for quite some time then. With a pseudo reason of visiting their dear friend Pangan, arrived Agustin Manuguit and his father Felipe Salalila (chief from Maysilo), Magat Salamat (chief of Tondo), Pedro Balinguit (chief from Pandacan), Geronimo Basi and Gabriel Tuambasan (Legazpi's brothers), Luis Amanicalao and his son Calao, Dionisio Capulong (chief of Candaba) and his brother Felipe Salonga (chief of Polo), Felipe Amarlangagui (chief of Catangalan), Francisco Acta (another chief from Tondo), and Omaghicon (chief of Navotas). Timawas, servants, and other allies were also invited to the secret meeting.

=== Planning of the conspiracy ===
All conspirators went planning for three days, pretending to be merely celebrating and drinking as they were keeping their planning under the covers. As they recalled the good old times before the Spanish conquest, they had strengthened their unified bond. Subsequently, they agreed that they would always protect each other and if the Spaniards' initiatives toward the freedom of the datus' slaves were reinforced, they would unite in preventing this to come into fruition.

=== Involved foreign parties ===
Legazpi told his co-conspirators that he knew a Japanese captain of a trading boat named Juan Gayo, a Japanese Christian, whom he frequently entertained in his home. They were able to communicate through his interpreter, Dionisio Fernandez. Through him, the conspirators were assured of weapons they could use for the revolt. He also allegedly promised to provide them with Japanese warriors, under the deal that he would get a half of the tribute to be collected in the Philippines. The warriors were to arrive in Manila and pretend they arrived with peaceful intentions by bringing in ship flags for the Spaniards to use. Once they captured the Spaniards, Legazpi was to be made king. However, there was no fine print that dictated for how long this deal would go on, thus showing the lack of organization in the plan.

Legazpi also had ties with Brunei, as he was the son-in-law of the sultan. As such, the conspiracy also sought the help of Borneo. They believed they would come join and help the uprising not only because of their apparent blood ties, but because of their historical clash with the Christian Spaniards as well. The plan was that once Bornean fleets arrived at Cavite causing the Spaniards to call the chiefs to their aid, they would arrive with their men and attack the Spaniards in their own homes.

== Events and plots ==
The conspiracy would remain a plot for long, as almost a year would pass before the conspirators could come up with another step in their plot. In 1588, they learned that the English pirate Thomas Candish had captured the Spanish galleon Santa Ana. He had apparently threatened the Spaniards of taking over Manila. They waited for him to arrive in hopes that he would act on his threat to fight the Spaniards; once he did, they planned to overthrow the government by overpowering them on land. However, they made no contact with Candish to let them know of their plans. He had made his way to the Visayas (where he failed to burn a galleon being built in Aravelo) and after, to India and then England.

The conspiracy started to materialize more once Pangan met with Esteban Taes, a chieftain from Bulacan. They planned an all-Tagalog uprising: Taes invited all other chiefs from Bulacan to Tondo, while Pangan planned to send letters to the gobernadorcillo of Malolos and Guiguinto, as well as to reach out to chiefs from Laguna and Batangas. However, their planned meeting with all the chiefs never pushed through. Thus, Pangan went to approach datus from Pampanga hoping they could unite their cause because several Pampango chiefs were about to file a petition asking the government to suspend the freeing of their slaves. However, they had no interest in joining the uprising because they were in favor of the Spaniards and the King. It was after the inability to form a meeting with other Tagalog chiefs and the rejection of Pampango chiefs when the conspirators sought the help of Borneans.

However, when the time of attack came, Gayo did not come through with the arms or warriors either because he lost interest or betrayed the rebels. While they were waiting in vain for help that did not come, the conspirators were caught when Magat Salamat revealed their plan against the Spaniards to Antonio Surabao.

Magat Salamat had been chosen chief envoy to go to Borneo and communicate the plan to the sultan. On his way over, Salamat stopped at Cuyo island, where he was able to recruit a native chief named Sumaclob to join the uprising. After transferring to another Calamianes island, Salamat met Surabao, who was a Cuyo native pretending to be a supporter. He was actually a servant of Pedro Sarmiento, a Spanish encomendero. Surabao then betrayed the rebels’ plan to his master, Sarmiento, who brought Magat Salamat, Don Agustin Manuguit, and Don Joan Banal to Manila as captives. He exposed the conspirators’ plan against the Spanish government to Governor General Santiago de Vera on October 26, 1588, with the plan having been in motion for over 15 months. As a result, with Salamat in captive, the plan, their letters and gifts never reached the sultan of Brunei. Moreover, the governor ordered the arrest of all members part of the conspiracy who were tried and investigated in court.

== Aftermath ==
There were harsh penalties given to the conspirators, especially to the leaders Agustin de Legazpi and Martin Pangan who were brutally hanged while their heads were chopped off and placed in iron cages. Their properties were also seized, with half going to the royal treasury and the other half to judicial expenses. Furthermore, their homes plowed and sown with salt to remain barren. A similar fate occurred to Dionisio Fernandez who was also hanged and his properties confiscated. Other conspirators who were executed were Magat Salamat, Geronimo Basi, and Esteban Taes.

While some people were punished severely, others were let off on a milder sentence such as paying heavy fines or being exiled from their towns. Notable members who were exiled to New Spain (Mexico) were Pedro Balunguit, Pintonggatan, Felipe Salonga, Calao, and Agustin Manuguit. Balanguit was charged with six years of exile and payment of six tael of orejas gold, Pintonggatan with two years, Salonga with eight years, Calao with four years, and Manuguit with six years of exile and payment of 20 tael of orejas gold.

Ironically, Agustin de Legaspi's family, including his wife of Bruneian Caliph descent, passed through California, which was named after the female Caliph in the novel 'The Adventures of Esplandián', on their route to Mexico. Their exile had also made them some of the earliest Filipino immigrants to the Americas. Later on mixed Christian-Muslim families of newly Hispanized Philippines at the Americas, opposed the issue of slavery in the Americas. They were on different sides to the issue of slavery compared to their Crypto-Muslim and Crypto-Jewish Spanish co-religionists, direct from Spain, who supported slavery in the Americas Filipinos in the Americas were firmly in support of Native American and African struggles against slavery.

== Significance ==
At the beginning of the Manila Galleon Trade, slaves and exiles were exchanged between Manila and Acapulco. The exiles of these datus were significant because they were reported to be the first Filipinos to settle in Mexico.

The conspiracy is also worth noting for it is the only recorded plot during the Spanish colonial period where Luzon chiefs attempted to enlist help from the Muslims. The trace and influence of Islam in Manila and the Tagalog regions disappeared with passing of these Tagalog chiefs—allowing stability for Catholicism in the region in the future. It is also worth pointing out that the Indios tried to fight for their lost freedom only after quickly surrendering to the Spaniards. Thus, their uprising had them labelled as rebels as they were already subject under Spanish rule; this contrasted them from Muslims who never surrendered to the Spaniards. Furthermore, it was different from other uprisings in the seventeenth century because the primary goal was to overthrow the Spanish rule rather than to protest the oppression of a tribute collector, alcalde, or friar. The chiefs sought to get rid of Spanish control rather than be satisfied with the death of a particular Spanish official. It is also in this uprising where the persona of the traitor first appeared. Lastly, the conspiracy was not an isolated case, as several other uprisings were being planned in regions like Cebu and Panay as well.

== See also ==
- Philippine revolts against Spain
- Military history of the Philippines
