= Lakan =

Early Filipino nobility

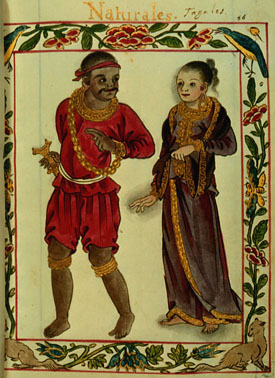
"Naturales" (natives) depicted in the Boxer Codex, specifically marked and identified as Tagalogs.

In early Philippine history, the rank of lakan denoted a "paramount ruler" (or more specifically, "paramount datu") of one of the large coastal barangays (known as a "bayan") on the central and southern regions of the island of Luzon.

== Overview ==
The lakan was democratically selected by other ruling datus from among themselves to serve as their "pangulo" (head). Writers such as William Henry Scott have suggested that this rank is equivalent to that of rajah, and that different ethnic groups either used one term or the other, or used the two words interchangeably. But other writers such as Nick Joaquin have suggested that the usage of the term "rajah" specifically indicates leadership of a bayan or barangay which has extensive trade relations with Muslim traders. Equivalent terms for this rank include the term "sultan" in the Muslim polities of Mindanao, and the term "datu" as used by various polities in the Visayas and in some areas of Mindanao.

== Orthography ==
There is no particular legal or academic prescription of orthography for the title of lakan. Thus it may be spelled separate from the person's name (e.g. "Lakan Dula"), or be incorporated with the name to form a single word (e.g. "Lakandula").

Rajah and lakan: It is sometimes argued that since the titles "rajah" and "lakan" are roughly equivalent, the two should not be used together. Thus, referring to Lakandula as Rajah Lakandula is said to be the result of mistaking Lakandula to be the full proper name of the said king.

In his book, Tagalog Borrowings and Cognates (2024), linguist Jean-Paul Potet lists the word 'laka' as the possible earlier form of the title; the added 'n' is a shortened '-ng', a descriptive linker that is a contraction of the word 'nang/ng'. The man Dula is described as a 'laka' in the phrase, "laka na Dula", which becomes "Lakang Dula" contracted further to 'Lakandula", meaning the Chief who is Dula. The cognate identified for 'laka' is the Javanese word 'raka', which means 'lord', "the highest-ranking ruler of a region comprising several communities" in pre-Hinduist Java. Hindi influences brought the title 'raja' to the Philippines. Perhaps from the Spanish colonists' lack of knowledge and/or interpretation of Tagalog,'lakan' was believed to be the word for highest chief starting from the Spanish period. This probable 'mistake' is akin to the contemporary use of the word 'barong' instead of the grammatically correct 'baro', as an abbreviation of the phrase 'barong Tagalog'; the latter is a contraction of the descriptive phrase, 'baro na Tagalog', which means 'shirt that is Tagalog (or worn by the Tagalogs)'. The proper word for shirt is 'baro', but the use of the word 'barong' as if it were a stand-alone noun has become widespread and mainstream.

== Prominent lakans ==
Users of the title lakan that figure in 16th- and 17th-century Spanish colonial accounts of Philippine history include:

- Lakandula (later christened as Don Carlos Lacandola), ruler of Tondo when the Spanish conquest of Luzon began.
- Lakan Tagkan, ruler of Namayan.

== Present-day usage ==
In present-day culture, the term is still occasionally used to mean "nobleman", but has mostly been adapted to other uses.

The name of Malacañan Palace, the official residence of the president of the Republic of the Philippines, is traditionally attributed to the phrase may lakan diyan, or "the king [or head] resides there".

In Filipino Martial Arts, lakan denotes an equivalent to the black belt rank. Also, beauty contests in the Philippines have taken to referring to the winner as "lakambini", the female equivalent of lakan. In such cases, the contestant's assigned escort can be referred to as a lakan. More often, a male pageant winner is named a lakan.

Philippine National Police Academy graduates are called lakan (male) and lakambini (female).

== See also ==
- Principalía
- Maginoo
- Datu
- Maharlika
- Timawa
- Philippine shamans
- Tondo (historical polity)
- Barangay
- History of the Philippines (pre-1521)
