= Luciano P. R. Santiago =

Filipino historian and writer

Luciano Perez-Rivera Santiago (June 21, 1942 – February 1, 2019) was a Filipino writer, historian, and psychiatrist best known for his award-winning books on Philippine history and the arts. He was a psychiatrist by profession.

== Education ==
Santiago was an alumnus of the University of the Philippines College of Medicine in Manila. After graduating, he trained in both adult and child psychiatry at the Sheppard and Enoch Pratt Hospital in Baltimore, Maryland and practiced there for a while before returning to the Philippines to be a physician at the Department of Psychiatry of The Medical City Hospital in Pasig.

== Awards ==
Santiago has received a number of prizes and awards for his work, including:

- The National Book Award for Art and for History (from the Manila Critics Circle),
- The Wendell Muncie Prize for Distinguished Writing in Psychiatry (from the Maryland Psychiatric Society),
- The Premio Manuel Bernabé (Primer Premio) in History (from the Centro Cultural de la Embajada de Espana),
- The Dr. Pedro Villaseñor Award for Genealogy,
- The Catholic Author Award (from the Asian Catholic Publishers)
- The Catholic Press Award (from the Archdiocese of Manila), and
- A Research Grant Award from the Toyota International Foundation.

== Bibliography ==
- Santiago, Luciano P. (1990). The art of ancestor hunting in the Philippines. Quezon City: New Day Publ. ISBN 978-971-10-0437-8.
- Santiago, Luciano P. R. (1987). The hidden light: the first Filipino priests. Quezon City, Philippines: New Day Publishers. ISBN 978-971-10-0339-5.
- Santiago, Luciano P. (2010). More Pinay than we admit: the social construction of the Filipina. Quezon City: Vibal Foundation. ISBN 9789710538126.
- Santiago, Luciano P. R. (2005). To love and to suffer: the development of the religious congregations for women in the Spanish Philippines, 1565-1898. Quezon City: Ateneo de Manila University Press. ISBN 9789715504782.
- Santiago, Luciano P. (1873). Children of Oedipus: Brother and Sister Incest in Psychiatry, Literature, History and Mythology. Quezon City: Libra Pub. ISBN 978-0-87212-028-0.
