= History of Luzon =

The history of Luzon covers events that happened in the largest island of the Philippine Archipelago, Luzon. Luzon wrested the record of having the oldest man ever discovered in the Philippines with discovery of the Callao Man in 2007, which predated the Tabon Man by around 20,000 years. The written history of Luzon began in around 900 CE with the discovery of the Laguna Copperplate Inscription in 1989. After that, Luzon began to appear in the annals of the Japanese. One example would be the , wherein Luzon appeared in 22 records. Luzon was split among Hindu-Buddhist kingdoms, Muslim principalities, and ethnoreligious tribes, who had trading connections with Borneo, Malaya, Java, Indochina, India, Okinawa, Japan before the Spanish established their rule. As a result of the Spanish–American War, Luzon became American territory. In the Second World War, Luzon saw one of the fiercest battles during the Japanese occupation. Luzon, apart from being the largest island, had been the economic and political center of the Philippines ever since the country entered the Western Calendar, being home to the country's capital city, Manila, and the country's largest metropolis, Metro Manila.

== Prehistory of Luzon ==
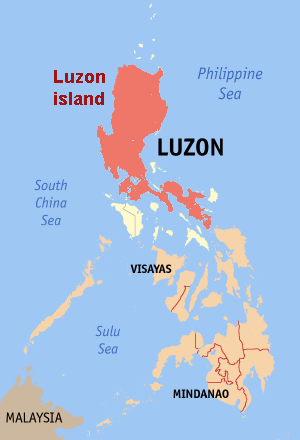
Map showing Luzon in red shade.

The first evidence of the systematic use of Stone-Age technologies in the Philippines is estimated to have dated back to about 50,000 BCE, and this phase in the development of proto-Philippine societies is considered to end with the rise of metal tools in about 500 BCE, although stone tools continued to be used past that date. However, new discoveries in Luzon, particularly in Liwan, Kalinga, found stone tools that were dated through potassium argon test at most 920,000 years old, and at least 750,000 years old.

The earliest human remains known in the Philippines are the fossilized remains discovered in 2007 by Armand Salvador Mijares in Callao Cave, Peñablanca, Cagayan. The find was of a 67,000-year-old remains that predate the Tabon Man, which was discovered in 1962 by Robert Bradford Fox. Specifically, the find consisted of a single 61 millimeter metatarsal which, when dated using uranium series ablation, was found to be at least about 67,000 years old. If definitively proven to be remains of Homo sapiens, since there was a certainty that the Callao Man could be a Homo floresiensis, it would antedate the 47,000-year-old remains of Tabon Man to become the earliest human remains known in the Philippines, and one of the oldest human remains in the Asia Pacific.

The primary theory surrounding the migration of Callao Man and his contemporaries to Luzon from what is believed to be the present-day Indonesia is that they came by raft. It is notable that the approximate time this happened is, according to experts, prior to the point when human beings were thought to be capable of making long voyages across the sea. It has also been noted that Callao Man could have crossed into the Philippines by a land bridge. This is because at the time Callao Man lived, it was the period known as Ice age and the sea level was lower. Because of lower sea levels, there could have been an Isthmus between the Philippines and the rest of Southeast Asia.

=== Cultural and technological achievements ===
Mining in the Philippines began around 1000 BCE. However, the discovery of a brass needle in Musang Cave, Cagayan pushed back the date to 2160 BCE, the date the needle was made. Metal smiths from this era had already developed a crude version of modern metallurgical processes, notably the hardening of soft iron through carburization. However, unlike the typical pattern, there had been no shift to copper or bronze implements before iron implements, it had been from stone to iron.

== History of Luzon during the Classical Period ==
=== Laguna Copplerplate Inscription ===
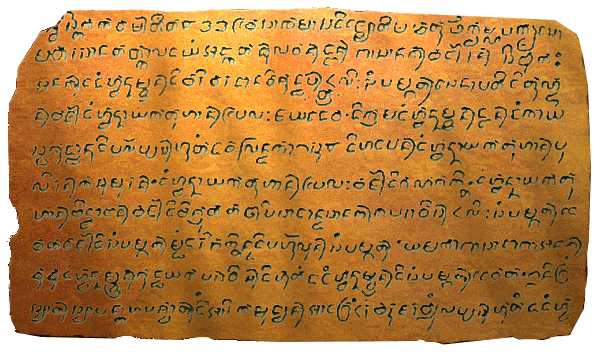
e Inscription (circa CE 900) is inscribed with small writing hammered into its surface. It shows heavy Indian cultural influence (by way of Medang) present in the Philippines prior to Spanish colonization in the 16th century.

The Laguna Copperplate Inscription is the earliest known written document found in the Philippines. The plate was found in 1989 by a sand labourer near the mouth of the Lumbang River in Barangay Wawa, Lumban, Laguna. The inscription on the plate was first deciphered by Dutch anthropologist Antoon Postma.

The inscription is on a thin copper plate measuring less than 20 × 30 cm (8 × 12 inches) in size with words directly embossed onto the plate. It differs in manufacture from other Javanese scrolls of the period, which had the words inscribed onto a heated, softened scroll of metal.

Inscribed on it the Saka era date year of Saka 822, month of Waisaka, the fourth day of the waning moon, which corresponds to Monday, 21 April 900 CE in the Gregorian calendar. The writing system used is the Kawi Script, while the language is a variety of Old Malay, and contains numerous loanwords from Sanskrit and a few non-Malay vocabulary elements whose origin is between Old Tagalog and Old Javanese. The document states that it releases its bearers, the children of Namwaran, from a debt in gold amounting to 1 kati and 8 suwarnas (865 grams). The original text was written with an English translation below. (Place names are in bold.)

**Transliteration**

**English translation**

Swasti. Ṣaka warṣatita 822 Waisakha masa di(ng) Jyotiṣa.

Long Live! In the Year of Saka 822, month of Waisakha, according to the astronomer.

Caturthi Kriṣnapaksa Somawāra sana tatkala Dayang Angkatan lawan dengan nya sānak barngaran si Bukah anak da dang Hwan Namwaran di bari waradāna wi shuddhapattra ulih sang pamegat senāpati di Tundun barja(di) dang Hwan Nāyaka tuhan Pailah Jayadewa.

The fourth day of the waning moon, Monday. On this occasion, Lady Angkatan, and her relative whose name is Bukah, the children of the Honorable Namwaran, were awarded a document of complete pardon from the Commander-in-Chief of **Tundun**, represented by the Lord Minister of **Pailah**, Jayadewa.

Di krama dang Hwan Namwaran dengan dang kayastha shuddha nu di parlappas hutang da walenda Kati 1 Suwarna 8 di hadapan dang Huwan Nayaka tuhan Puliran Kasumuran dang Hwan Nayaka tuhan Pailah barjadi ganashakti.

This means that, through the Honorable Scribe, the Honourable Namwaran is totally cleared of his salary-related debts of 1 Katî and 8 Suwarna, before the Honorable Lord Minister of **Puliran**, Kasumuran; by the authority of the Lord Minister of **Pailah**, represented by Ganasakti.

Dang Hwan Nayaka tuhan Binwangan barjadi bishruta tathapi sadana sanak kapawaris ulih sang pamegat Dewata [ba]rjadi sang pamegat Mdang dari bhaktinda diparhulun sang pamegat.

the Honourable and widely-renowned Lord Minister of **Binwagan**, represented by Bisruta. And, with his whole family, upon ordered of the Lord Minister of **Dewata**, represented by the Chief of **Mdang**, because of his loyalty as a subject of the Commander-in-Chief.

Ya makanya sadanya anak cucu dang Hwan Namwaran shuddha ya kapawaris dihutang da dang Hwan Namwaran di sang pamegat Dewata.

Therefore, the living descendants of the Honorable Namwaran are cleared of all debts of the Honorable Namwaran to the Lord Minister of **Dewata**.

Ini gerang syat syapanta ha pashkat ding ari kamudyan ada gerang urang barujara welung lappas hutang da dang Hwa.

This, in any case, whosoever, sometime in the future, who shall state that the debt is not yet cleared of the Honorable...

The Laguna Copperplate Inscription, among other recent finds such as the Golden Tara of Butuan and 14th century pottery and gold jewellery in Cebu, is significant in revising precolonial Philippine history, which was until then considered by some Western historians to be culturally isolated from the rest of Asia, as no evident pre-Hispanic written records were found at the time. Noted Philippine historian William Henry Scott debunked these theories in 1968 with his Prehispanic Source materials for the Study of Philippine History which was subsequently published in 1984.

=== The barangay government ===
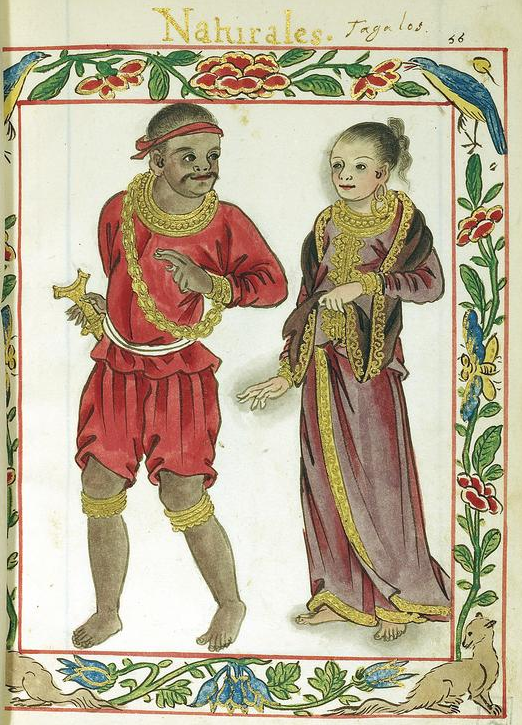
Tagalog royalty and his wife, wearing the distinctive color of his class (red), an illustration from the Boxer Codex.

The barangay government emerged in around the 3rd century, which owed the name from the Malay boat balangay. In more developed barangays in the Visayas (e.g. Cebu, Bohol, and Panay) which were the first to be conquered by Spain by means of pacts, peace treaties, and reciprocal alliances, the datu was at the top of the social order in a sakop or haop (elsewhere referred to as barangay). In Luzon, the social structure had been less stable and more complex as compared to the barangays in the Visayas. Enjoying a more extensive commerce than those in Visayas, having the influence of Bornean political contacts, and engaging in farming wet rice for a living, the Tagalogs, who had established the dominant pre-colonial barangays in Luzon, were described by the Spanish Augustinian friar Martin de Rada as more traders than warriors.

The more complex social structure of the Luzon barangays was less stable because it was still in a process of differentiating. A Jesuit priest Francisco Colin made an attempt to give an approximate comparison of it with the Visayan social structure in the middle of the 17th century. The term datu or lakan, or apo refers to the chief, but the noble class to which the datu belonged to was known as the maginoo class. Any male member of the maginoo class can become a datu by personal achievement.

The Yongle Emperor instituted a Chinese Governor on Luzon during Zheng He's voyages and appointed Ko Ch'a-lao to that position in 1405. China also had vassals among the leaders in the archipelago. China attained ascendancy in trade with the area in Yongle's reign.

In c.1595, the Spanish made a manuscript known as the Boxer Codex which contained illustrations of Filipinos during the early Spanish era. Aside from a description of, and historical allusions to the Philippines and various other Far Eastern countries, it also contains seventy-five colored drawings of the inhabitants of these regions and their distinctive costumes. At least fifteen illustrations deal with the natives of the Philippine Archipelago.

In the period between the 7th century to the beginning of the 15th century, numerous prosperous centers of trade had emerged, including the three city-states that formed in what is now Metro Manila, Pila, Cebu, Iloilo, Butuan, Pangasinan, Caboloan, Pampanga, Kumintang and Aparri (which specialized in trade with Japan and the Kingdom of Ryukyu in Okinawa).

=== Ma-i ===
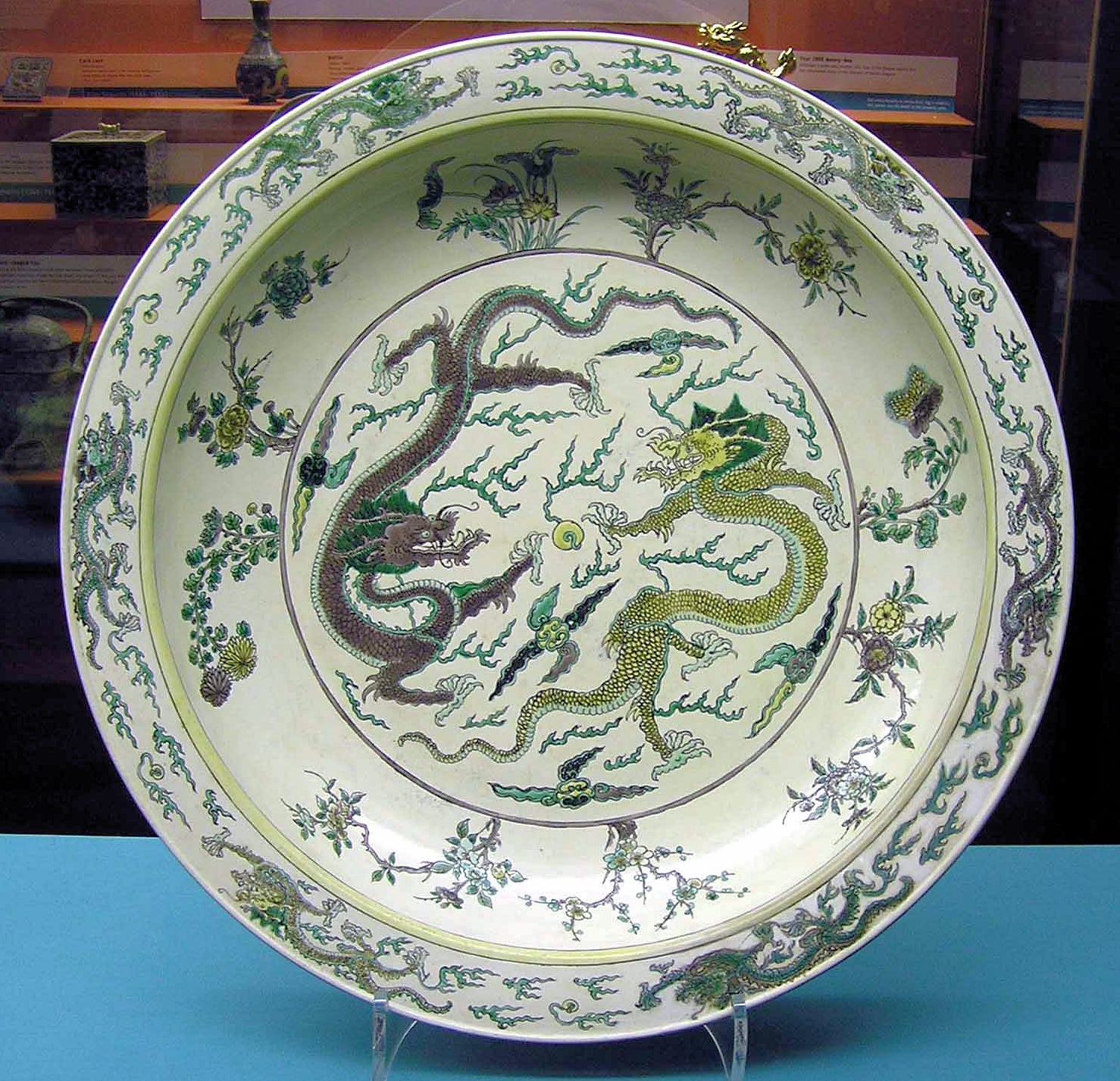
Chinese porcelain-ware, Kangxi era (1662–1722), Qing Dynasty. Ancient Chinese porcelain excavated in Mindoro, Philippines; proves the existence of trade between the island and Imperial China. This consequently validates Chinese historical records of the area.

Ma-i (also spelled Ma'i, Mai, Ma-yi or Mayi; Chinese: 麻逸; Pe̍h-ōe-jī: má it) was a pre-colonial Philippine state whose existence was recorded in the Chinese Imperial annals Zhu Fan Zhi and History of Song. It is also recorded in the Sultanate of Brunei's royal records as the nation of Maidh. This state was said to have been centered on the island of Mindoro.

Traders from Ma-i (麻逸, present-day Mait in northern Mindoro) came to Guangdong as early as 971 during the Northern Song dynasty (960‒1127). Their activities received the attention of officials at the Chinese Bureau of Maritime Trade. The traders came again in 982. During the Southern Song dynasty, officials at the Chinese Bureau of Maritime Trade in Fujian reported the arrival of more merchants from various Philippine islands: Ma-i, Baipuer 白蒲邇 (present-day Babuyan Islands), and Sandao 三嶋, which was known also as Sanyu 三嶼, a term that was used collectively to refer to the following three islands: Jamayan 加麻延 (present-day Calamian), Balaoyou 巴姥酉 (present-day Palawan), and Pulihuan 蒲裏喚. Their trading activities, especially those by merchants from Sanyu, continued well into the Yuan dynasty (1271‒1368).

The country of Mai is to the north of Borneo. The natives live in large villages on the opposite banks of a stream and cover themselves with a cloth like a sheet or hide their bodies with a loin cloth. There are metal images (Buddhas) of unknown origin scattered about in the tangled wilds. Few pirates reach these shores. When trading ships enter the harbor, they stop in front of the official plaza, for the official plaza is that country's place for barter and trade and once the ship is registered, they mix freely. Since the local officials make a habit of using white umbrellas, the merchants must present them as gifts.

—

== Sources ==
- Agoncillo, Teodoro A.; Guerrero, Milagros (1975). History of the Filipino People (4 ed.). R. P. Garcia. ISBN 9712345386.
- Agoncillo, Teodoro A. (1962). Philippine History. Inang Wika Publishing Company. ISBN 9712345386.
- Alip, Eufronio Melo (1954). Political and Cultural History of the Philippines. Vol. 1–2 (revised ed.). Alip & Sons.
- Antonio, Eleanor D.; Dallo, Evangeline M.; Imperial, Consuelo M.; Samson, Maria Carmelita B.; Soriano, Celia D. (2007). Turning Points I' 2007 Ed (unabridged ed.). Rex Bookstore, Inc. ISBN 978-9712345388.
- Bishop, Carl Whiting (1942). War Background Studies. Contributor Smithsonian Institution. Smithsonian Institution.
- Bishop, Carl Whiting (1942). Origin of Far Astern Civilizations: A Brief Handbook. Contributor Smithsonian Institution. Smithsonian Institution.
- Corpuz, Onofre D. (1957). The Bureaucracy in the Philippines. Institute of Public Administration, University of the Philippines.
- Demetrio, Francisco R. (1981). Myths and Symbols: Philippines (2 ed.). National Book Store.
- Del Castillo y Tuazon, Antonio (1988). Princess Urduja, Queen of the Orient Seas: Before and After Her Time in the Political Orbit of the Shri-vi-ja-ya and Madjapahit Maritime Empire: A Pre-Hispanic History of the Philippines. A. del. Castillo y Tuazon.
- Dizon, Eusebio (1983), The Metal Age in the Philippines: An Archeometallurgical Investigation, Manila: National Museum of the Filipino People
- Farwell, George (1967). Mask of Asia: The Philippines Today. Praeger.
- Fitzgerald, Charles Patrick (1966). A Concise History of East Asia. Praeger.
- Ho, Khai Leong, ed. (2009). Connecting and Distancing: Southeast Asia and China (illustrated ed.). Institute of Southeast Asian Studies. ISBN 978-9812308566.
- Jocano, F. Landa (2001), Filipino Prehistory: Rediscovering Precolonial Heritage, Quezon City: Punlad Research House, Inc., ISBN 971-622-006-5
- Karnow, Stanley (2010). In Our Image: America's Empire in the Philippines (unabridged ed.). Random House LLC. ISBN 978-0307775436.
- Krieger, Herbert William (1942). Peoples of the Philippines. Vol. 3694 of Publication (Smithsonian Institution). Smithsonian Institution. ISBN 9780598408662.
- Lucman, Norodin Alonto (2000). Moro Archives: A History of Armed Conflicts in Mindanao and East Asia. FLC Press.
- Liao, Shubert S. C., ed. (1964). Chinese Participation in Philippine Culture and Economy. Bookman. Archived from the original on Nov 9, 2006.
- Manuel, Esperidion Arsenio (1948). Chinese Elements in the Tagalog Language: With Some Indication of Chinese Influence on Other Philippine Languages and Cultures, and an Excursion Into Austronesian Linguistics. Contributor Henry Otley Beyer. Filipiniana Publications.
- Ostelius, Hans Arvid (1963). Islands of Pleasure: A Guide to the Philippines. G. Allen & Unwin.
- Panganiban, José Villa; Panganiban, Consuelo Torres (1965). The Literature of the Pilipinos: A Survey (5 ed.). Limbagang Pilipino.
- Panganiban, José Villa; Panganiban, Consuelo Torres- (1962). A Survey of the Literature of the Filipinos (4 ed.). Limbagang Pilipino.
- Quirino, Carlos (1963). Philippine Cartography, 1320-1899 (2 ed.). N. Israel.
- Ravenholt, Albert (1962). The Philippines: A Young Republic on the Move. Van Nostrand.
- Regalado, Felix B.; Franco, Quintin B. (1973). History of Panay. Central Philippine University.
- Roces, Alfredo R., ed. (1977), "Boxer Codex", Filipino Heritage: The Making of a Nation, vol. IV, Philippines: Lahing Pilipino Publishing, Inc.
- Sevilla, Fred; Balagtas, Francisco (1997). Francisco Balagtas and the Roots of Filipino Nationalism: Life and Times of the Great Filipino Poet and His Legacy of Literary Excellence and Political Activism. Trademark Pub. Corp. ISBN 9789719185802.
- Scott, William Henry (1984), Prehispanic Source Materials for the study of Philippine History, New Day Publishers, ISBN 971-10-0226-4
- Spencer, Cornelia (1951). Seven Thousand Islands: The Story of the Philippines. Aladdin Books.
- Tan, Antonio S. (1972). The Chinese in the Philippines, 1898-1935: A Study of Their National Awakening. R. P. Garcia Publishing Company.
- Yust, Walter, ed. (1949). Encyclopædia Britannica: A New Survey of Universal knowledge, Volume 9. Encyclopædia Britannica.
- Walter Yust, ed. (1954). Encyclopædia Britannica. Vol. 9 of EncyclopÆdia Britannica: A New Survey of Universal Knowledge. EncyclopÆdia Britannica.
- Zaide, Gregorio F. (1957). The Philippines Since pre-Spanish Times. Vol. 1 of Philippine Political and Cultural History (revised ed.). Philippine Education Company.
- Zaide, Gregorio F. (1979). The Pageant of Philippine History: Political, Economic, and Socio-cultural. Vol. 1. Philippine Education Company.
- Philippines (Republic). Office of Cultural Affairs (1965). The Philippines: A Handbook of Information. Contributor National Economic Council (Philippines) (revised ed.). Republic of the Philippines, Department of Foreign Affairs.
- Philippine Chinese Historical Association (1975). The Annals of Philippine Chinese Historical Association. Vol. 5–8 (revised ed.).
- IAHA Conference (1962). Biennial Conference Proceedings, Issue 1. Philippine Historical Association.
- The Philippines: A Handbook of Information. 1955.
- University of Manila Journal of East Asiatic Studies. Vol. 7 (revised ed.). University of Manila. 1959.
- Unitas, Issues 1-2. Vol. 30. University of Santo Tomás. 1957.
- The Researcher, Issue 2. Vol. 2. Dagupan Colleges, University of Pangasinan. 1970.
- Philippine Social Sciences and Humanities Review. Vol. 24–25. University of the Philippines. College of Liberal Arts. 1959.
- Philippine Social Sciences and Humanities Reviews. Vol. 24. College of Liberal Arts, University of the Philippines. 1959.
- Studies in Public Administration, Issue 4. Institute of Public Administration, University of the Philippines. 1957.
- Proceedings [of The] Second Biennial Conference, Held at Taiwan Provincial Museum, Taipei, Taiwan. Republic of China, October 6-9, 1962. Tʻai-pei. 1963.
- Yearbook. 1965.
- Philippine Almanac & Handbook of Facts. 1977.
- International Institute of Differing Civilizations (1961). Compte rendu. Contributor International Colonial Institute. The Institute.
