= 900 in the Philippines =

- Decades
- See also: List of years in the Philippines

900 in the Philippines details events of note that happened in the Philippines in the year 900.

== Events ==
=== April ===
- April 21 – Namwaran and his children, Lady Angkatan and Bukah, are granted pardon by the Lakan (ruler) of Tondo, as represented by Jayadewa, Lord Minister of Pila, which released them of all their debts as inscribed in the Laguna Copperplate Inscription.

== See also ==
- List of years in the Philippines
- Timeline of Philippine History
