= History of the Philippines (900–1565) =

Pre-colonial era of the Philippines
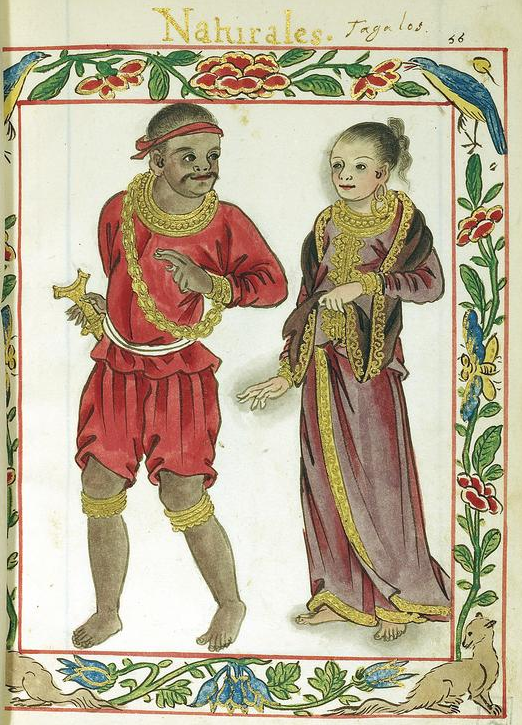
- Horizon: Philippine history
- Geographical range: Southeast Asia
- Period: c. 900–1560s
- Major sites: Tondo, Maynila, Pangasinan, Pila, Limestone tombs, Idjang citadels, Panay, Cebu (historical polity), Butuan (historical polity), Sanmalan, Sultanate of Maguindanao, Sultanate of Sulu, Ma-i, Bool, Kumalarang, Gold artifacts, Singhapala
- Characteristics: Indianized kingdoms, Hindu and Buddhist Nations, Malay Sultanates
- Preceded by: Prehistory of the Philippines
- Followed by: Spanish colonial period

The recorded pre-colonial history of the Philippines, sometimes also referred to as its "classical period" or "protohistoric period," begins with the creation of the Laguna Copperplate Inscription in 900 AD and ends with the beginning of Spanish colonization in 1565. The inscription on the Laguna Copperplate Inscription itself dates its creation to 822 Saka (900 AD). The creation of the document is considered to mark the end of the prehistory of the Philippines on Monday, April 26, 900 AD, and the formal beginning of its recorded history. During this period, the Philippine archipelago was home to numerous kingdoms and sultanates and was part of the Indosphere and Sinosphere.

Sources of precolonial history include archaeological findings; records from contact with the Song dynasty, the Brunei Sultanate, Korea, Japan, and Muslim traders; the genealogical records of Muslim rulers; accounts written by Spanish chroniclers in the 16th and 17th centuries; and cultural patterns that at the time had not yet been replaced through European influence.

== Societal categories ==
Early Philippine society was composed of diverse subgroups such as fishermen, farmers and hunter-gatherers, with some living in mountainside swiddens, some on houseboats and some in commercially developed coastal ports. Some subgroups were economically self-sufficient, and others had symbiotic relationships with neighboring subgroups. Society can be classified into four categories as follows:

1. Classless societies, societies with no terms which distinguish one social class from another;
2. Warrior societies, societies with a recognized class distinguished by prowess in battle;
3. Petty plutocrats, societies with a recognized class characterized by inherited real property; and
4. Principalities, societies with a recognized ruling class with inherited rights to assume political office, or exercise central authority

== Social classes ==
The fourth societal category above can be termed the datu class, and was a titled aristocracy.

The early polities were typically made up of three-tier social structure: a nobility class, a class of "freemen", and a class of dependent debtor-bondsmen:

- Datu (ruling class) and Maginoo (noble class, where the datu ascends from)
- Maharlika/Timawa (freemen; warrior class)
- Alipin (dependent class), classified into aliping namamahay (serfs) and aliping saguiguilid (slaves)

== Laguna Copperplate Inscription ==
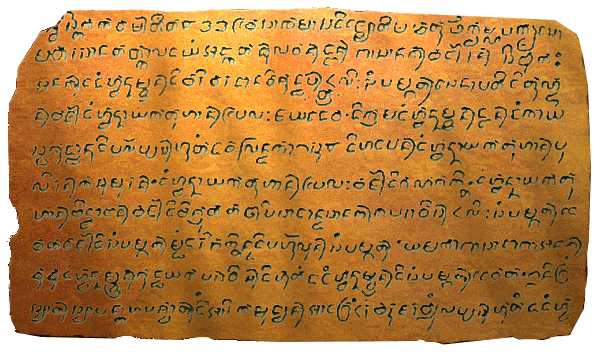
Reconstructed image of the Laguna Copperplate Inscription

The Laguna Copperplate Inscription (LCI) is the earliest record of a Philippine language and the presence of writing in the islands. The document measures around 20 cm by 30 cm and is inscribed with ten lines of writing on one side.

=== Text ===
The text of the LCI was mostly written in Old Malay with influences of Sanskrit, Tamil, Old Javanese and Old Tagalog using the Kawi script. Dutch anthropologist Antoon Postma deciphered the text. The date of the inscription is in the "Year of Saka 822, month of Vaisakha", corresponding to April–May in 900 AD.

The text notes the acquittal of all descendants of a certain honorable Namwaran from a debt of 1 kati and 8 suwarna, equivalent to 926.4 grams of gold, granted by the Military Commander of Tundun (Tondo) and witnessed by the leaders of Pailah, Binwangan and Puliran, which are places likely also located in Luzon. The reference to the contemporaneous Medang Kingdom in modern-day Indonesia implies political connections with territories elsewhere in the Maritime Southeast Asia.

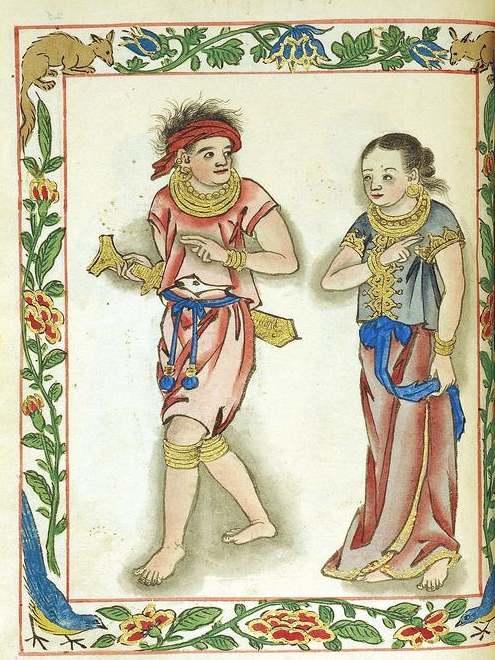
Depiction of a noble Visayan couple in the 16th-century (Boxer Codex)

== Politics ==
=== Emergence of independent polities ===
Early settlements, referred to as barangays, ranged from 20 to 100 families on the coast, and around 150–200 people in more interior areas. Coastal settlements were connected over water, with much less contact occurring between highland and lowland areas. By the 1300s, a number of the large coastal settlements had emerged as trading centers, and became the focal point of societal changes. Some polities had exchanges with other states across Asia.

Polities founded in the Philippines from the 10th to 16th century include Pila, Maynila, Tondo, Namayan, Kumintang, Pangasinan, Caboloan, Cebu, Butuan, Maguindanao, Buayan, Lanao, Sulu, and Ma-i. Among the nobility were leaders called datus, responsible for ruling autonomous groups called barangay or dulohan. When these barangays banded together, either to form a larger settlement or a geographically looser alliance group, the more esteemed among them would be recognized as a "paramount datu", rajah, or sultan which headed the community state. There is little evidence of large-scale violence in the archipelago prior to the 2nd millennium AD, and throughout these periods population density is thought to have been low.

Pre-colonial polities in the Philippine archipelago
Polity / Kingdom	Period	Today part of
Ijang Settlements	Unknown – 1790	Batanes
Lawang	Unknown − 1605	Samar, parts of Eastern Visayas
Samtoy	Unknown – 1572	Ilocos Region
Ibalon	Unknown – 1573	Bicol Region
Kumintang	Unknown – 1581	Batangas City
Taytay	Unknown – 1623	Northern Palawan
Cainta	Unknown – 1571	Rizal
Bo-ol	Unknown − 1595	Bohol, parts of Northern Mindanao
Pila	Before 900-1575	Pila, Laguna and parts of Rizal
Tondo	Before 900–1589	Manila, parts of Central Luzon, Calabarzon and Bicol
Ma-i	Before 971 – c. 1339	Mindoro Island, parts of Southern Luzon
Sanmalan	Before 982 – 1500s	Zamboanga
Butuan	Before 989 – 1521	Butuan, parts of Northern Mindanao and Caraga
Namayan	Before the 11th century – 1571	Manila, parts of Calabarzon
Caboloan	Before 1225 – 1572	San Carlos City, Pangasinan
Sandao	Before 1225 – c. 1300s	Calamian, Palawan, and parts of Luzon
Pulilu	Before 1225 – 1571	Polillo, Quezon
Pangasinan	Before 1225 – 1576	Pangasinan, parts of Northern Luzon
Madja-as	After the 11th century	Western Visayas
Lubao	14th century – 1571	Pampanga
Sultanate of Buayan	c. 1350–1905	Parts of Maguindanao del Norte, Maguindanao del Sur, Cotabato, South Cotabato and General Santos City
Sugbu	c. 1400–1565	Cebu, parts of Central Visayas
Sultanate of Sulu	1457–1915	Sulu Archipelago, parts of Southern Palawan, Sabah, North and East Kalimantan in north-eastern Borneo
Maynila	c. 1500–1571	Manila, parts of Central Luzon
Sultanate of Maguindanao	1515–1899	Maguindanao, parts of Bangsamoro, Zamboanga Peninsula, Northern Mindanao, Soccsksargen and Davao Region
Confederate States of Lanao	1616 – present	Lanao, parts of Bangsamoro

=== Other political systems by ethnic group ===
Locations of pre-colonial principalities, polities, kingdoms and sultanates in the Philippine archipelago

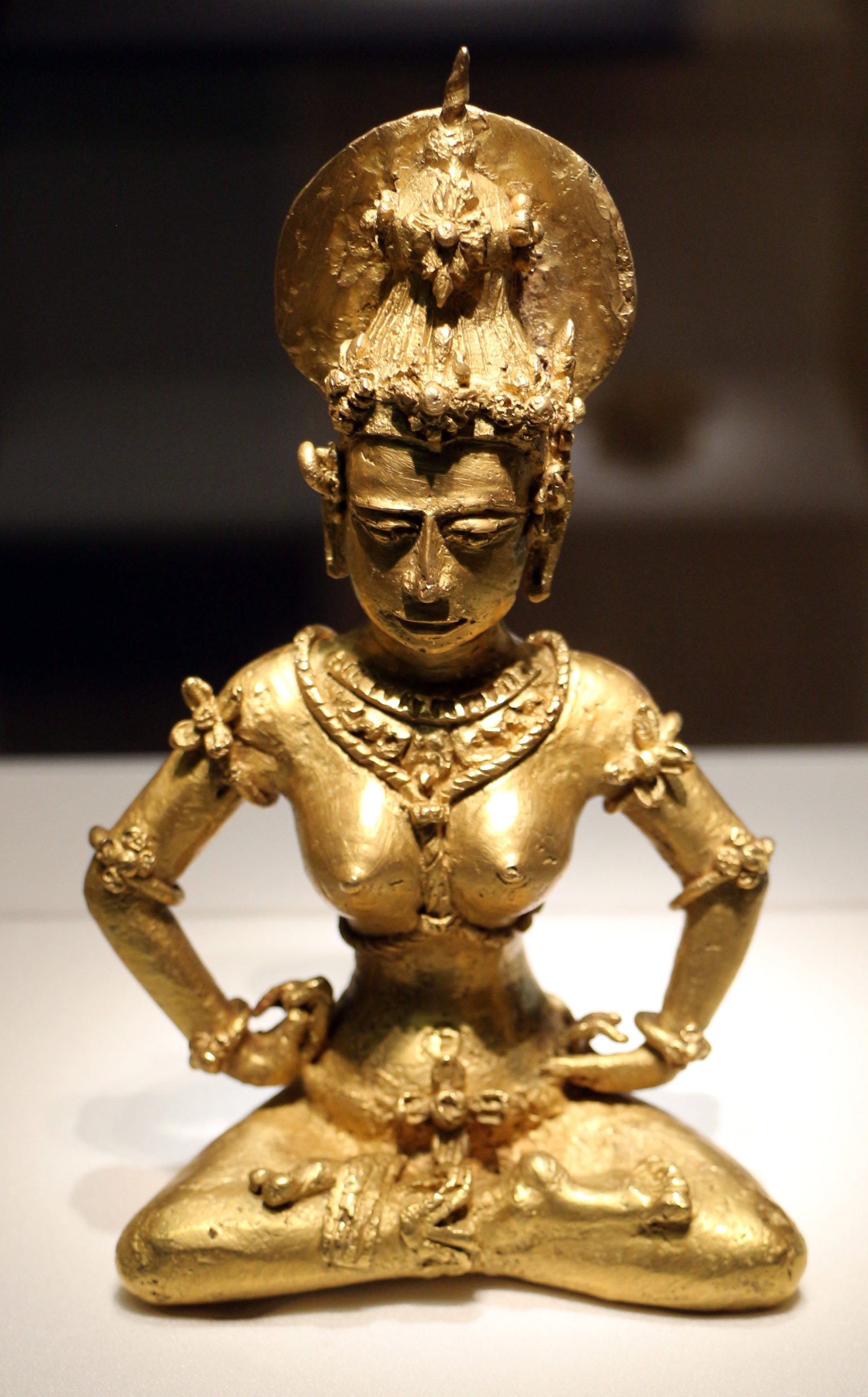
The Agusan image statue (900–950 AD) discovered in 1917 on the banks of the Wawa River near Esperanza, Agusan del Sur, Mindanao in the Philippines.

==== In Luzon ====
In the Cagayan Valley, the head of the Ilongot city-states was called a benganganat, while for the Gaddang it was called a mingal.

The Ilocano people in northwestern Luzon were originally located in modern-day Ilocos Sur and were led by a babacnang. Their polity was called samtoy which did not have a royal family but, rather, was a collection of certain barangays (chiefdoms).

==== In Mindanao ====
The Lumad people from inland Mindanao are known to have been headed by a datu.

The Subanon people in the Zamboanga Peninsula were ruled by a timuay until they were overcome by the Sultanate of Sulu in the 13th century.

The Sama-Bajau people in Sulu who were not Muslims nor affiliated with the Sultanate of Sulu were ruled by a nakurah before the arrival of Islam.

=== Trade ===
Trade with China is believed to have begun during the Tang dynasty, but grew more extensive during the Song dynasty. By the 2nd millennium AD, some Philippine polities were known to have sent trade delegations which participated in the Tributary system enforced by the Chinese imperial court, trading but without direct political or military control. The items much prized in the islands included jars, which were a symbol of wealth throughout South Asia, and later metal, salt and tobacco. In exchange were traded feathers, rhino horns, hornbill beaks, beeswax, bird's-nests, resin, and rattan.

== Indian influence ==
Indian cultural traits, such as linguistic terms and religious practices, began to spread within the Philippines during the 10th century, likely via the Hindu Majapahit empire.

=== Writing systems ===
Brahmic scripts reached the Philippines in the form of the Kawi script, and later the Baybayin writing system. The Laguna Copperplate Inscription was written using the Kawi script.

==== Baybayin ====
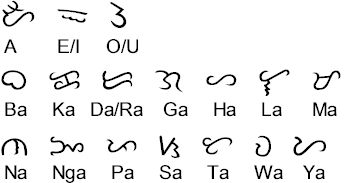
The Baybayin script

By the 13th or 14th century, the baybayin script was used for the Tagalog language. It spread to Luzon, Mindoro, Palawan, Panay and Leyte, but there is no proof it was used in Mindanao.

There were at least three varieties of baybayin in the late 16th century. These are comparable to different variations of Latin which use slightly different sets of letters and spelling systems.

In 1521, the chronicler Antonio Pigafetta from the expedition of Ferdinand Magellan noted that the people that they met in Visayas were not literate. However, in the next few decades the Baybayin script seemed to have been introduced to them. In 1567 Miguel López de Legaspi reported that "they [the Visayans] have their letters and characters like those of the Malays, from whom they learned them; they write them on bamboo bark and palm leaves with a pointed tool, but never is any ancient writing found among them nor word of their origin and arrival in these islands, their customs and rites being preserved by traditions handed down from father to son without any other record."

== Earliest documented Chinese contact ==
The earliest date suggested for direct Chinese contact with the Philippines was 982. At the time, merchants from "Ma-i" (now thought to be either Bay, Laguna on the shores of Laguna de Bay, or a site called "Mait" in Mindoro) brought their wares to Guangzhou and Quanzhou. This was mentioned in the History of Song and Wenxian Tongkao by Ma Duanlin which were authored during the Yuan Dynasty.

== Arrival of Islam ==
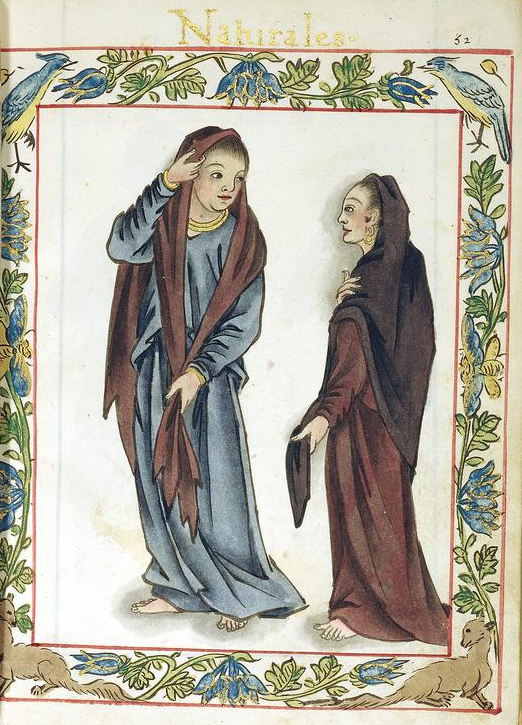
Depiction of female commoners in the Philippine archipelago during the 16th century when Spanish conquest began. (Boxer Codex)

=== Beginnings ===
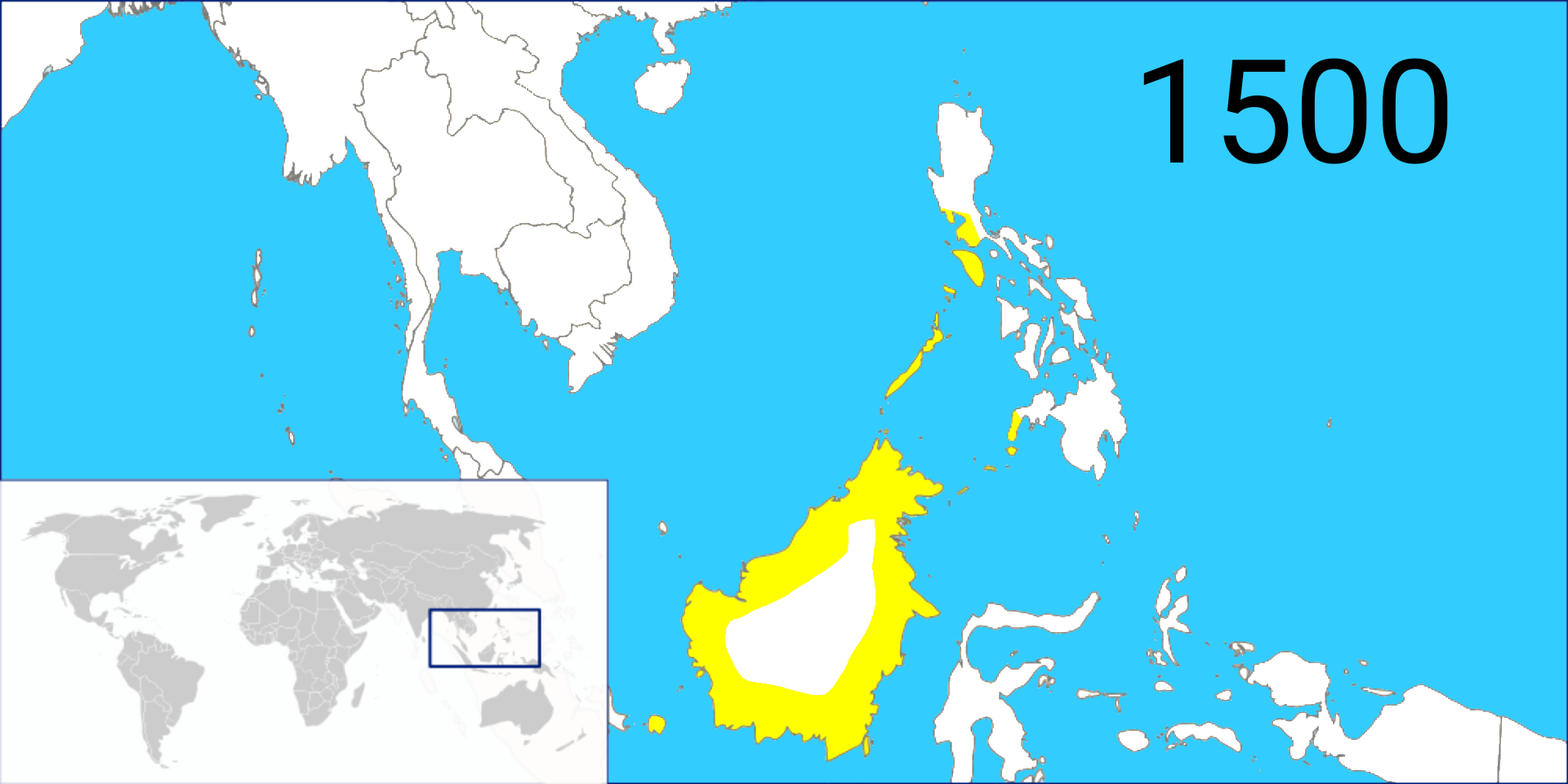
Around 1500, the Sultanate of Brunei controlled a western portion of the Philippine archipelago.

Muslim traders introduced Islam to the then-Indianized Malayan empires around the time that wars over succession had ended in the Majapahit Empire in 1405. Islam in the Philippines had established itself in Simunul, Tawi-Tawi, the oldest mosque in the country. By the 15th century, Islam was established in the Sulu Archipelago and spread from there. Subsequent visits by Arab, Persians, Malay and Javanese missionaries helped spread Islam further in the islands.

the Islamic "Raja" of the Philippines were good at defending the island nations, they often built their own: fleets, outposts, fortifications and ports. The Islamic community often ruled the country from their presence in Manila. Their legitimacy is known through their diplomatic relations that extended from China to India.

At the peak of Islam in the Philippines the Sultanate of Sulu once encompassed parts of modern-day: Indonesia, Malaysia and the Philippines. Their progress is recognized on the maps as evidence of political and military strength.

== Spanish expeditions ==
The following table summarizes expeditions made by the Spanish to the Philippine archipelago.

Spanish expeditions reaching the Philippine archipelago
Year	Leader	Ships	Landing
1521	(Portugal) / Ferdinand Magellan	Trinidad, San Antonio, Concepcion, Santiago, and Victoria	Homonhon, Limasawa, Cebu
1525	García Jofre de Loaísa	Santa María de la Victoria, Sancti Spiritus, Anunciada, San Gabriel, Santa María del Parral, San Lesmes, and Santiago	Surigao, Visayas, Mindanao
1527	Álvaro de Saavedra Cerón	Florida, Santiago, and Espiritu Santo	Mindanao
1542	Ruy López de Villalobos	Santiago, Jorge, San Antonio, San Cristóbal, San Martín, and San Juan	Samar, Leyte, Saranggani
1564	(Spain) Miguel López de Legazpi	San Pedro, San Pablo, San Juan, and San Lucas	First landed on Samar, established colonies as part of Spanish Empire

=== First expedition ===
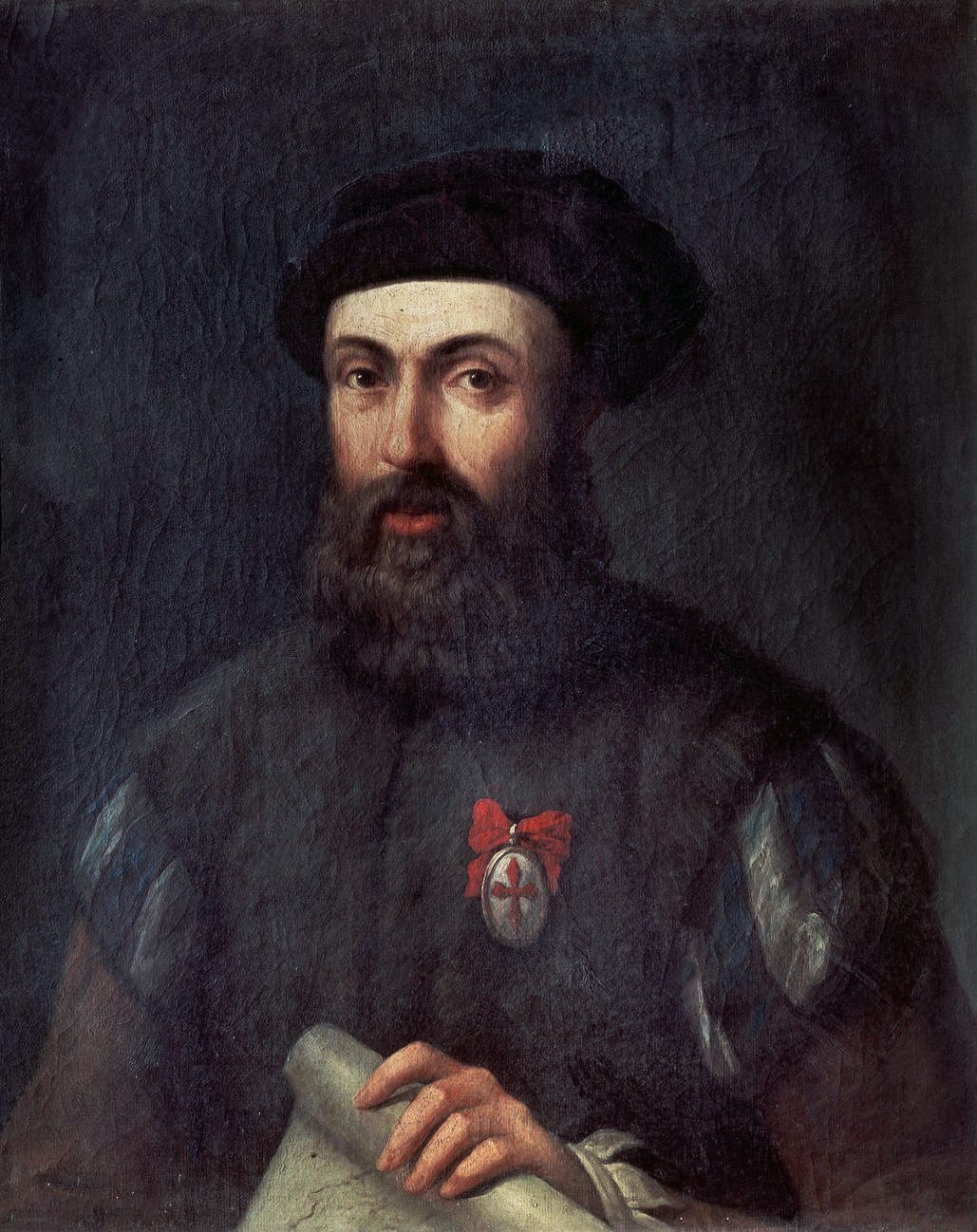
Ferdinand Magellan

Although the archipelago may have been visited before by the Portuguese (who conquered Malacca City in 1511 and reached Maluku Islands in 1512), the earliest European expedition to the Philippine archipelago was led by the Portuguese navigator Ferdinand Magellan in the service of King Charles I of Spain in 1521.

The Magellan expedition sighted the mountains of Samar at dawn on March 17, 1521, making landfall the following day at the small, uninhabited island of Homonhon at the mouth of Leyte Gulf. On Easter Sunday, March 31, 1521, on the island of Mazaua, Magellan planted a cross on the top of a hill overlooking the sea and claimed the islands he had encountered for the King of Spain, naming them Archipelago of Saint Lazarus as stated in First Voyage Around The World by his companion, the chronicler Antonio Pigafetta.

Magellan sought alliances among the people in the islands beginning with Datu Zula of Sugbu (Cebu) and took special pride in converting them to Christianity. Magellan got involved in the political conflicts in the islands and took part in a battle against Lapulapu, chief of Mactan and an enemy of Datu Zula.

At dawn on April 27, 1521, Magellan with 60 armed men and 1,000 Visayan warriors had great difficulty landing on the rocky shore of Mactan where Lapulapu had an army of 1,500 waiting on land. Magellan waded ashore with his soldiers and attacked Lapulapu's forces, telling Datu Zula and his warriors to remain on the ships and watch. Magellan underestimated the army of Lapulapu, and, grossly outnumbered, Magellan and 14 of his soldiers were killed. The rest managed to reboard the ships.

The battle left the expedition with too few crewmen to man three ships, so they abandoned the Concepción. The remaining ships – Trinidad and Victoria – sailed to the Spice Islands in present-day Indonesia. From there, the expedition split into two groups. The Trinidad, commanded by Gonzalo Gómez de Espinoza tried to sail eastward across the Pacific Ocean to the Isthmus of Panama. Disease and shipwreck disrupted Espinoza's voyage and most of the crew died. Survivors of the Trinidad returned to the Spice Islands, where the Portuguese imprisoned them. The Victoria continued sailing westward, commanded by Juan Sebastián Elcano, and managed to return to Sanlúcar de Barrameda, Spain in 1522.

=== Subsequent expeditions ===
After Magellan's expedition, four more expeditions were made to the islands, led by García Jofre de Loaísa in 1525, Sebastian Cabot in 1526, Álvaro de Saavedra Cerón in 1527, and Ruy López de Villalobos in 1542.

In 1543, Villalobos named the islands of Leyte and Samar Las Islas Filipinas in honor of Philip II of Spain, at the time Prince of Asturias.

=== Conquest of the islands ===
Philip II became King of Spain on January 16, 1556, when his father, Charles V, abdicated the thrones of both the Spanish and Holy Roman Empire; the latter went to his uncle, Ferdinand I. On his return to Spain in 1559, the king ordered an expedition to the Spice Islands, stating that its purpose was "to discover the islands of the west". In reality its task was to conquer the Philippine islands.

On November 19 or 20, 1564, a Spanish expedition of a mere 500 men led by Miguel López de Legazpi departed Barra de Navidad, New Spain, arriving at Cebu on February 13, 1565. They soon established Fort San Pedro in the abandoned settlement, but were on the verge of collapse from hunger and intermittent skirmishes from Sugbuhanon descending from the hills until Moro (muslim Tagalog) merchants from Luzon, unaware of their origins, arrived and saved them with food and arms supplies.

“Truly, had God not mercifully for them, they would have been in greater trouble and need than they were, for two or three times they were in dire absolute want, some ships of Moro merchants from Luzon arrived at the camp without their knowing where they came from or why, whom the Governor received very well and paid what they wanted, so the camp was supplied and had enough to eat, whereas, had they had to maintain it by making war on the natives, they would certainly have been lost and perished.”

— Relación muy circunstanciada de lo occurrido en el Real y Campo de la Isla de Zubu de las Islas Philipinas desde 10 de Junio de 1565 ...", Collección de Documentos inéditos de Ultramar, II Series, Vol. 3 (Madrid 1887), pp. 163-164

It was this expedition that established the first Spanish settlements. It also resulted in the discovery of the tornaviaje return route to Mexico across the Pacific by Andrés de Urdaneta, heralding the Manila galleon trade, which lasted for two and a half centuries.

== See also ==
- Anito
- Antonio de Morga
- Antonio Pigafetta
- Barangay (pre-colonial)
- Baybayin
- Boxer Codex
- Butuan (historical polity)
- Cainta (historical polity)
- Caboloan
- Dambana
- Datu
- Enrique of Malacca
- Ferdinand Magellan
- First Mass in the Philippines
- Tondo (historical polity)
- Lacandola Documents
- Lakan
- Lapulapu
- List of sovereign state leaders in the Philippines
- Luzones
- Ma-i
- Madja-as
- Maginoo
- Maharlika
- Maynila (historical polity)
- Kumintang (historical polity)
- Pangasinan (historical region)
- Philippine shamans
- Pila (historical polity)
- Pintados
- Pulilu
- Rajah
- Rajah Humabon
- Rajahnate of Butuan
- Rajahnate of Cebu
- Sandao
- Sanmalan
- Sultanate of Maguindanao
- Sultanate of Sulu
- Sultanate of Buayan
- Confederate States of Lanao
- Suyat
- Thimuay
- Timawa
- Warfare in pre-colonial Philippines
- Tawalisi
- Use of gold in early Philippine history
- History of the Philippines
- Prehistory of the Philippines
- History of the Philippines (Spanish Era 1521–1898)
- History of the Philippines (American Era 1898–1946)
- History of the Philippines (Third Republic 1946–65)
- History of the Philippines (Marcos Era 1965–86)
- History of the Philippines (Contemporary Era 1986–present)
