= Pila (historical polity) =

City-state in what is now Pila, Laguna, from c. 900 to 1575

Pailah Pila 𑼦𑼿𑼭𑼲𑽁 ᜉᜒᜎ᜵ᜉᜁᜎ
- before 900–1575
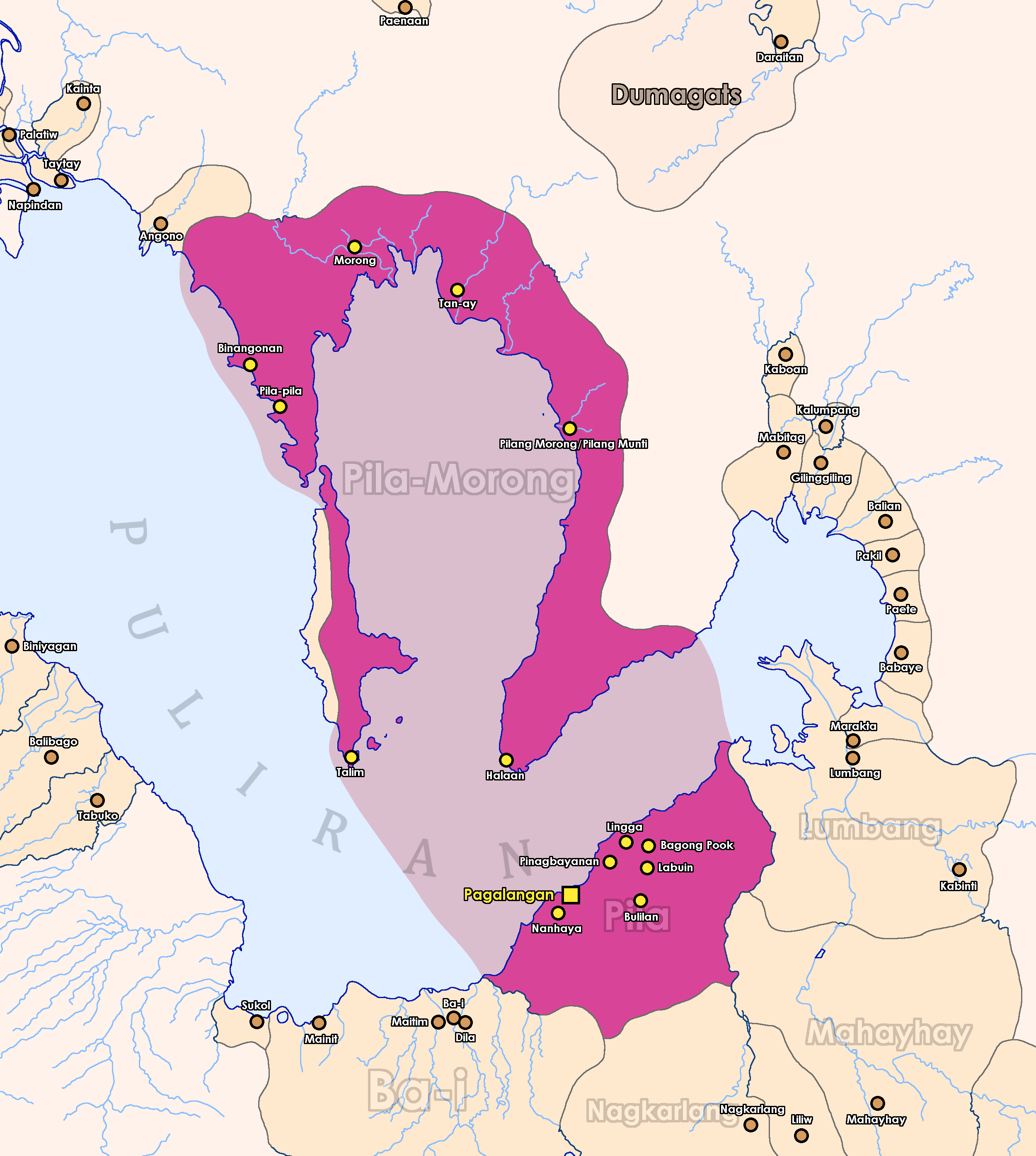
- A map of Old Pila during the rule of Gat Salian Maguinto in the mid-14th century.
- Capital: Pailah/Pinagbayanan (c.900-c.1375); Bagong Pook (c.1375); Pagalangan (c.1375-1575)
- Official languages: Old Tagalog and Old Malay
- Religion: Hinduism; Tantrayana Buddhism; Islam (Note: Practiced by some members of the "Maginoo" caste, the apex social class (Scott, 1994)); Tagalog polytheism
- Government: Feudal Bayan ruled by a lord
- Lord
  - fl. 900: Jayadewa
  - 14th century: Gat Salian Maguinto
- History
  - Settling of Tagalogs into Laguna de Bay: before 900
  - First historical mention, in the Laguna Copperplate Inscription; trade relations with the Mataram kingdom implied: 900
  - Severe flooding in Pila and relocation of capital: c.1375
  - Spanish conquest of Laguna de Bay: 1571
  - Reorganization of encomiendas in Laguna: 1575
- Currency: Piloncitos, Gold rings, Barter, and Rice
| Succeeded by |
| 1575; Captaincy General of the Philippines; La Laguna |
- Today part of: Philippines

Pila, formerly known as Pailah (Kawi: 𑼦𑼿𑼭𑼲𑽁, Baybayin: ᜉᜒᜎ/ᜉᜁᜎ), was an ancient Tagalog polity in what are the modern-day municipalities of Pila and Victoria in the province of Laguna in Luzon. It is one of the earliest recorded polities in the Philippines.

Pila was first mentioned in 900 as Pailah in the Laguna Copperplate Inscription, a document regarding a debt acquittance. Although once disputed by Dutch anthropologist Antoon Postma, recent scholarship such as the works of Luciano P.R. Santiago and Jaime F. Tiongson identified Pailah as Pila, as the document was found adjacent to Pila itself.

Pila was once one of the economic centers of the Laguna region, known for its sophisticated pottery, flat and fertile land as well as other archaeological artifacts as a result of maritime trade with regions the Malay Peninsula and China, as well as having diplomatic ties with Butuan.

== Etymology ==
In the early 17th century, Fr. Pedro de San Buenaventura claims that the name “Pila” took its name from the soft stone (piedra blanda) which “formed its entire floor”.

According to historian Luciano P.R. Santiago, the name Pila means “stone” or “soil” in Tagalog, and that pila pila or pilapil is a term used to refer to the mixture of soils and stones, which typically form the bed land of rice fields in the Philippines. In the present day, the word pila is used to refer to clay soil.

== Location ==
=== Geography ===
Pila is situated in between Pulilan or Puliran, a term used to refer to the coastal region from Bay to Pila, as well as Silangan, which was the eastern region ranging from Lumbang to Siniloan. Both Pulilan and Silangan combined constituted the Dagatan ng Baé (Lake of Bay), which was the ancient name for Laguna de Bay.

=== LCI Dispute ===
When the Laguna Copperplate Inscription was first discovered and analyzed by historians like Antoon Postma in 1990, he first speculated that Pailah was situated in Pila, but later in his study he changed his mind and suggested it was in modern-day Norzagaray in Bulacan. One of his main reasons was due to ‘Pailah’ being a diphthong, which made it apparent that the term Pailah could not have transitioned into Pila. The Pila Historical Society and Jaime F. Tiongson (2006) however suggested that it was possible for the name Pailah to have transitioned into Pila in the same logic as the Tagalog terms transitioning from baywang to bewang or tainga to tenga. Tiongson’s theory is supported by other scholars such as Nancy Kimuell-Gabriel as well as Elsa Clavé and Arlo Griffiths.

== History ==
=== Prehistory ===
Laguna de Bay was considered to be one of the most prosperous sites of habitation in the early Tagalog migration period. Its geography is flat and richly irrigated, and a rich source of freshwater. Many settlements formed along the coast of the large lake.

The earliest evidence for human habitation in Pila dates back to the 10th century archaeological findings from 1967, when an early-10th century cemetery was discovered in the area which included 150 graves accompanied by ceramics from other parts of Asia including China. The pits and jars showed hints of cremation. The inhabitants of Pila were also known for making clay pottery, due to the inherent softness of the area’s soil, which is where the name of the settlement was derived from.

=== Laguna Copperplate Inscription ===
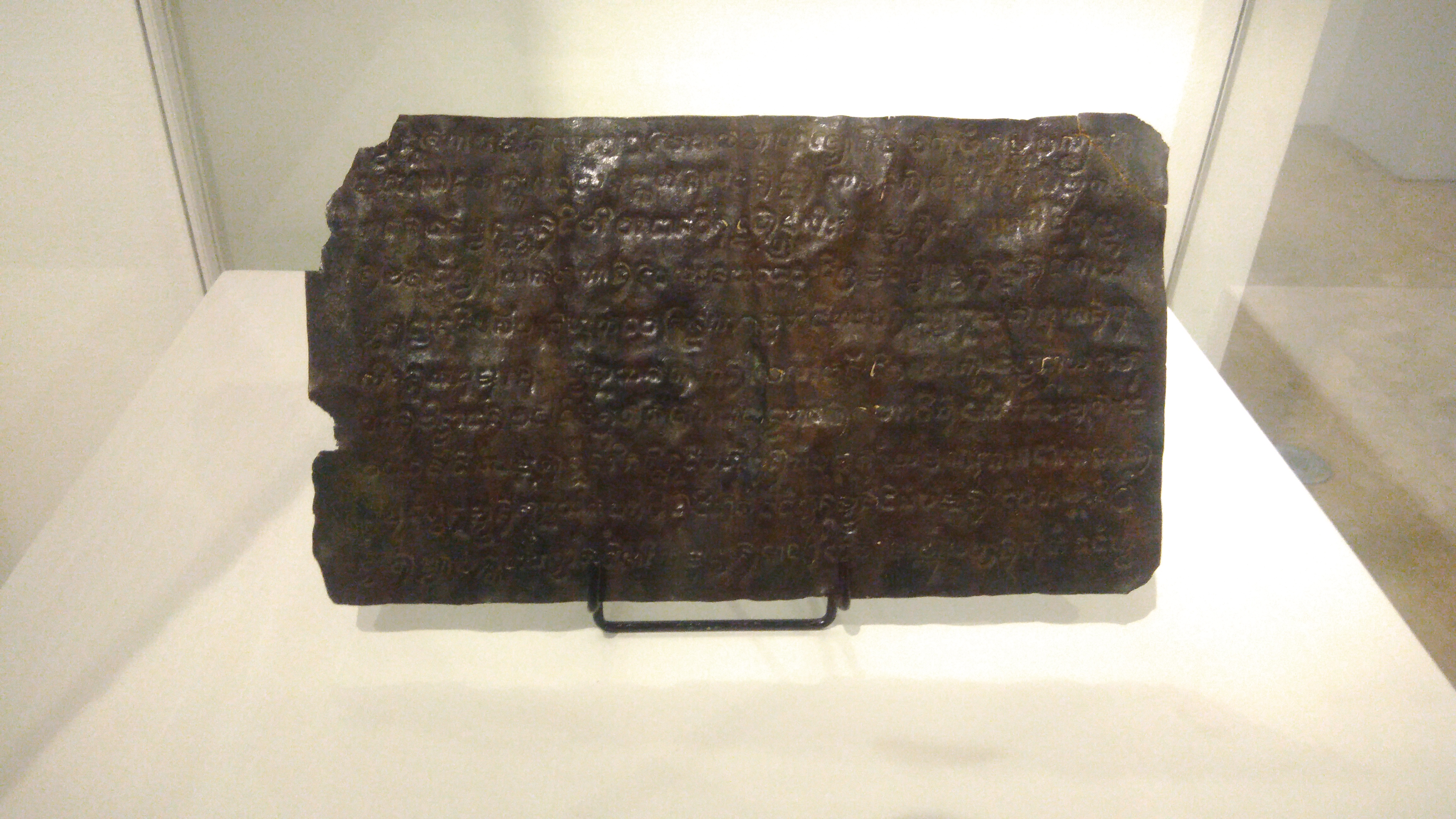
An image of the Laguna Copperplate Inscription (900).

The Laguna Copperplate Inscription was an official acquittance document discovered in 1987 in Wawa at the town of Lumban in Laguna which dates back to the Shaka year 822, equivalent to the date of Monday, 21 April 900 in the Julian calendar. It was written on a copper plate in Old Malay with incorporated words from Sanskrit and Old Tagalog using the Kawi script, first translated by Dutch anthropologist Antoon Postma.

The first part of the document says that:

On this occasion, Lady Angkatan, and her brother whose name is Bukah, the children of the Honourable Namwaran, were awarded a document of complete pardon from the Senepati of Tundun, with the title of His Honor the Lord of Pailah, Jayadewa.

The acquittal document mentions Namwaran, who along with his relatives such as Lady Angkatan and Bukah, were acquitted of a debt owed to the Lord of Devata by Jayadewa (meaning “Royal Victor”), who was the Senepati (army commander) of Tundun and Lord of Pailah. The document also specifies that Pailah was the seat of power (ganashakti) of Jayadewa.

=== Trade with Song China ===
In the 12th to 14th centuries, Pila engaged in extensive trade with the Chinese, often regarding ceramics. This was evidenced by archaeological findings in the Pila capital of Pinagbayanan around the same time period. This point in time was regarded as a prosperous age for Pila, flourishing into a commercial and cultural center in the Laguna de Bay region. However, Pinagbayanan was abandoned due to flooding in 1375.

=== Legend of Gat Salian Maguinto ===
According to Go Bon Juan (2005), legends and oral histories mention a kingdom that flourished in the vicinity of Laguna de Bay. This was corroborated by Vitales (2013) who mentioned that the area around Pila, Talim Island, Tanay and other lakeshore towns were said to have belonged to a single state.

The bards of the shores of the Morong peninsula once sang of the exploits of a lord known as Gat Salian Maguinto, who was a gold-rich datu of Pila whose control encompassed Pila, Talim, Pililla, Jalajala, Tanay, Baras and Morong. Pililla itself is a diminutive which meant ‘minor Pila’, suggesting that Pililla was once a dependency of Pila. “Maguinto” was a regal title which meant “full of gold”. The descendants of Gat Salian Maguinto were regarded as the founders of various towns in modern-day Rizal province, bearing the surname Gatchalian.

==== Transfer to Pagalangan ====
Oral traditions such as the one mentioned by Fr. Juan de Plasencia (1589) stated that the datu of Pila once bought a new site with his gold to make use of as a field. Santiago suggested that the datu may have been Gat Salian, and that the transaction occurred around the year 1375, when the old site of Pila (Pinagbayanan) and Bulilan were abandoned due to severe flooding and transferred to Bagong Pook (new place). However, the new site failed to thrive due to its poorer location, pressuring the datu to buy a new site called Pagalangan (meaning "place of reverence") from another lord, which was a higher and more solid location.

==== Expansion and rivalry with Namayan ====
During this period, Gat Salian Maguinto was a fierce opponent of Lakantagkan of Namayan as he was said to have been a leader who frequently engaged in violent raids, especially towards the Aeta settlements of Ironga or Paidas, having formed an alliance, located in the coasts of modern-day Rizal Province. The Aetas formed an alliance with the leader of Tan-ay against Pila, but to no avail. During this encounter, the Aeta leader Baug was killed by Gat Salian and the settlements were burned. He proceeded to conquer these areas as well as the eastern part of Talim Island.

=== Spanish colonial rule ===
After the Battle of Bangkusay in June 1571, Legazpi, Governor-General of the Philippines, awarded encomiendas to various subjects, as well as the Spanish crown. One of the benefactors was Don Francisco de Herrera, who received Pagalangan and other villages around Laguna as part of his encomienda. With the reorganization of the encomienda system in 1575, Pila was granted to Don Hernando Ramírez on 29 July of the same year. Pila, now a Spanish settlement, was given the title “La Noble Villa de Pila” (The Noble Town of Pila). The Franciscans led by Fr. Juan de Plasencia and Fr. Diego de Oropesa eventually took control of Pila and adjacent areas around Laguna and Tayabas in 1578. The first church of Pila was built in 1581 at Pagalangan, in dedication to San Antonio de Padua before a much sturdier church was completed in 1617.

== Language ==
The primary language of Pila was Old Tagalog according to the account of Fr. Juan de Plasencia, a very influential missionary responsible for the conversion of Laguna Tagalogs into Christianity. This was corroborated by linguistic evidence provided by R. David Zorc, who theorized that Tagalogs came from Eastern Visayas or Northern Mindanao and settled in Luzon sometime in the 9th-10th centuries, roughly around the same time period as the Laguna Copperplate Inscription. However, as the LCI shows, Old Malay was also spoken in Pila, and Sanskrit titles and honorifics were used frequently throughout the document.

For written communications, the people of Pila used both Kawi and Baybayin scripts. The Kawi script used in the copperplate was different from the Kawi used in Java, suggesting a different variant.

== Social Structure ==
=== Social Hierarchy ===
According to Fr. Juan de Plasencia, there were six overall classes of people in the society of old Pila, the highest of which, is the datu, who is the leader and the judge of a domain. The leader of Pila was also referred to as a datu. The elite or the nobility of a datu's bayan is referred to as the maginoo. Meanwhile, there were two kinds of commoners. The first was the timawa, who were neither slaves nor part of the elite. However, they were not confined towards anything. This contrasts the maharlikas, who were the warrior class and have an obligation to serve their datu in battle. The maharlikas could not transfer their allegiance except through marriage or through payment of a fee. The maharlika class was only present in Laguna during the period and nowhere else.

There was slavery, but it was distinguished into two types of slaves (alipin). The higher of the two are the aliping namamahay, who had their own houses and served their lords, comparable to serfs. This mainly happens due to debt or when petty crime is committed. Most often, they only provide a portion of their harvest and had access to land controlled by the overall bayan or barangay. They also had the chance to be freed after the payment of a debt. The latter, the aliping sagigilid, is more unfortunate, as they did not own anything, and had no chance of freedom in the future. Their offspring were also destined to be slaves.

Titles were also commonly used in daily communication. Ginoo for instance was used as a title of respect for both sexes historically, although it is still used today but only for men. Meanwhile, the titles Gat or Dayang were equivalent to Lord and Lady respectively. Maginto or Maygintawo, literally meaning 'full of gold' or 'has gold', were used to people with extreme wealth, as in the case of Gat Salian Maguinto, who both have the titles Gat and Maginto.

=== Sanskrit titles ===
An organized political structure had already existed in the Laguna de Bay area, including Pila since early antiquity, as evidenced by the common use of Hindu titles among the leaders in Laguna de Bay in the Laguna Copperplate Inscription. The use of titles such as Dang Hwan (His Honor), Nayaka Tuhan (the Lord/Master), Senepati (army commander or general) indicate high levels of Sanskrit influence in the region, as well as evidence that the inhabitants of Pila held great respect to its rulers. The most prominent leader who used such titles during the period was Jayadewa, who was the Senepati of Tundun and Lord of Pailah.

=== Women in Pila ===
In ancient Pila, women were often held almost in the same regard as with men. A woman could succeed to a chiefdom in absence of a male heir and inherited equal shares with their brothers. Various priestesses called the katalungan or catalonan were held in high esteem.

== Customs ==
=== Burials ===
The early inhabitants of Pila often washed the bones and wrapped up the corpses of the dead, as well as placing grave goods in the burial jars. They also practiced cremation, although it was a short-lived tradition.

When a master died, his slave was buried alive in the same grave as his master in a ship, so that he may serve his master in the next world. In many instances, a master died, and more than sixty slaves were buried alive in a ship within the earth. Funeral rites were then performed by drinking for more than a month.

=== Phallic cult ===
Apart from ancient burial jars, potteries, cemeteries, weaving and metallurgy, Pila was also known for its phallic cult. A large part of Pila near the old capital was called Lingga (from the Sanskrit lingam, which means phallus). In Tanay, which was a former territory of Pila, women often wiped their skirts on a large stone phallus to forestall barrenness.

== Demographics ==
According to de Plasencia, by the time Pila became an encomienda in 1582, which was sometime after Pila became subject to Spanish rule, it had a population of 1,600 people. However, by 1592, it was referred to as Pila de Grande, with a population of 6,800, second only to Bay.

== Religion ==
=== Tagalog polytheism ===
According to Fr. Juan de Plasencia, Tagalogs in the Laguna region which included that of Pila did not have temples consecrated for the worship of their idols. However, Tagalogs sometimes gathered in the house of a datu (simbahan) during the celebration of festivals (pandot). The process of worship is called nag-aanito, from the Tagalog word anito (god). Tagalogs had many gods before the colonial period. The almighty creator of the Tagalogs was Badhala or Bathala, which they also called May-Ari (creator). They also worshipped the sun, the moon, the Tala (morning star), as well as other gods like Dian Masalanta (Goddess of Love), Lakapati (God of Cultivation), Idianale (God of Husbandry), Lakanbakor (God of Fruits), Uwinan Sana (God of the Fields and Jungle) and Haik (God of the Sea). They also worshipped crocodiles (buwaya). The officiating priests of the Tagalogs were called the katalungan or catalonan, and it can be either male or female, and they dressed effeminately. However, bayog or bayogin was a more common term for male priests. Witchcraft was also common at the time.

Images of anitos were called licha or likha (creations), typically made of wood or soft clay. During a pagaanito session, Tagalogs offered food and beverages while reciting prayers, as well as performing ritualistic sacrifices, all to please the anitos.

Tagalogs believed that after one dies, their soul goes to a place called kasanaan (place for sailors) and the other is maka, both places in which they become anitos. It is said that souls who live in these places die seven times and are resurrected just as often. During this period, they have the power to give health or take it away, and they're able to do this via the air, and so Tagalogs worshipped them to seek for aid.

=== Islam ===
From the 14th to 16th centuries, Islam gradually spread throughout the Philippine Archipelago. It specifically began when the first mosque was built in Tawi-Tawi in 1380 by Syrian missionary Sheikh Karimul Makhdum. The Islamic faith was further strengthened after the marriage of Rajah Salalila to the daughter of Sultan Bolkiah of Brunei, which led to the Islamization of Luzon. However, the influence that Islam had on Pila itself remain obscure, apart from the fact that it received some Islamic influence.

== Economic activities ==
The economy of Pila as well as other polities in the shoreline of Laguna de Bay were regarded as one of the oldest and most important trading centers in the Philippines during the precolonial period, being situated at the center of the economic activities throughout the Tagalog region.

Pila relied mainly on fishing and agriculture due to the inherent abundance of rivers in the region. Weaving, pottery and metallurgy were also practiced in the area.

== Diplomatic relations ==
=== Tundun ===
Tundun is identified by most scholars such as Postma with Tondo, a bayan situated in the northern bank of the Pasig River delta. Tundun was first recorded in the LCI as under Jayadewa, its senepati (army commander), who also happened to be the Lord of Pailah (Pila). It remains unclear whether Jayadewa was from Tundun or Pailah, however Luciano P.R. Santiago suggested that Jayadewa's seat of power (ganashakti) was in Pailah.

=== Puliran ===
While it is speculated that the term Puliran or Pulilan mentioned in the LCI is used to refer to Laguna de Bay, a theory by Santiago suggested that since Puliran was mentioned as a settlement, that it was more likely referring to the settlement at Bulilan, which was an expansive area that currently serves as the modern-day town center of Pila itself. However Tiongson suggested that 'Puliran Kasumuran' referred to the “source” (sumur) of Laguna de Bay, placing its location around the region between Nagcarlan and Mauban in Quezon. Meanwhile, Postma pinpointed Puliran to modern-day Pulilan in Bulacan, and Kasumuran as a person who ruled Puliran, not a location.

The Leader of Puliran was mentioned as one of the witnesses to the debt acquittal done by Jayadewa to Namwaran and his relatives, suggesting a close diplomatic and political relationship between Pila and Puliran.

=== Binwangan ===
According to Antoon Postma, the location of Binwangan was situated around the modern-day municipality of Obando. However more recent studies such as that of Nancy Kimuell-Gabriel and Jaime F. Tiongson suggested that Binwangan was situated in Capalonga, Camarines Norte. Tiongson further stated that the region of Capalonga and Paracale in Camarines Norte were a part of the Tagalog region, and were heavily involved in the trade between the region and the settlements in Laguna. It was also speculated that the ruler of Pailah by the time of the Laguna Copperplate Inscription acted as the middleman at the trade route between Bicol and the rest of the Tagalog region.

=== Aetas ===
There were tensions between Aeta groups in coastal Morong, possibly Dumagats, as well as Pila, especially during the 14th century. Oral and folk history suggest that Gat Salian Maguinto waged war on the Aeta settlements of Ironga and Paidas, killing its leader, Baug. Having looted and burned their settlements, Gat Salian annexed their territory as part of his domain.

=== Bai ===
Pila was adjacent to Bai, and was bigger in territory compared to the latter. There was competition in trade between Pila and Bai for Chinese goods, especially regarding the procurement of ceramics.

=== Namayan ===
Namayan and Pila were rival states that fought for dominance over the Tagalog region. Lakantagkan constantly warned one of his sons Majulpedanra not to go to Talim Island as that was where “their enemies like Gat Salian Maguinto lurked”. However, Majulpedanra did not obey his father and proceeded to capture the western part of Talim Island (part of modern-day Binangonan) for the kingdom.

=== China ===
Various wares, golden beads, ornaments and other works of art coming from the Song and Yuan dynasties were found in Pila, suggesting consistent and active trade between the people of Pila and the Chinese traders in Laguna de Bay.

=== Maynila ===
The relations between Maynila and Pila, or Laguna for that matter, were not extensively recorded. However, Pila received influence from Maynila regardless as the latter controlled the flow of goods coming from outside the Philippine archipelago from the Pasig River all the way to Laguna de Bay. This allowed Maynila to control trade throughout the rest of the archipelago.

== Notable figures of Pila ==
=== Notable rulers of Pila ===
| Title | Name | Specifics | Dates | Primary source(s) | Academic reception of primary source(s) |
|---|---|---|---|---|---|
| Dang Hwan Nayaka Tuhan Pailah and Senepati di Tundun | Jayadewa | Senapati (army commander), known in the LCI as the ruler who gave the pardon to Namwaran and his relatives Dayang Angkatan and Buka for their excessive debts in c. 900. | c. 900 AD | Identified in the Laguna Copperplate Inscription as the ruler of Pailah and Tundun in c. 900 | Identification as ruler of Pailah and Tundun in c. 900 |
| Gat | Salian | Ruler of the eastern coasts of Laguna de Bay including Pila, Pililla, Jalajala and Cardona in Talim Island. He was also the fierce opponent of Lakantagkan of Namayan. | 14th century | Folk and oral history | Ruler of Pila and Pila-Morong |

=== Nobles associated with Pila ===
| Title | Name | Specifics | Dates | Primary sources | Academic notes on primary sources |
|---|---|---|---|---|---|
| Dang Hwan | Namwaran | Probable person-name mentioned in the Laguna Copperplate Inscription, as the ancestor of Namwaran and Bukah and original debtor of the transaction in question. The title "Hwan" is translated "Honourable" or "Lord" in different lines of the LCI, depending on context. | c. 900 AD | Translation of the Laguna Copperplate Inscription by Antoon Postma | |
| Dayang | Angkatan | Probable person-name mentioned in the Laguna Copperplate Inscription, as the descendant (daughter) of Namwaran. Related through Namwaran to Bukah. | c. 900 AD | Translation of the Laguna Copperplate Inscription by Antoon Postma | |
| | Bukah | Probable person-name mentioned in the Laguna Copperplate Inscription, as the descendant of Namwaran related to the Lady (Dayang) Angkatan | c. 900 AD | Translation of the Laguna Copperplate Inscription by Antoon Postma | |
| Dang Hwan Nayaka Tuhan Puliran | Kasumuran (uncertain) | Possible person-name mentioned in the Laguna Copperplate Inscription. The word may either be a reference to a Lord Minister or a reference to an ancient name of the Southeast coast region of Laguna Lake | c. 900 AD | Translation of the Laguna Copperplate Inscription by Antoon Postma | Identified by Postma as possibly being either a place-name or a person-name. Possible reference the Southeast coast region of Laguna Lake proposed by Tiongson |
| Dang Hwan Nayaka Tuhan Binuangan | Bishruta | Probable person-name mentioned in the Laguna Copperplate Inscription, as the representative of the Lord Minister of "Binuangan" | c. 900 AD | Translation of the Laguna Copperplate Inscription by Antoon Postma | Postma's conclusions about the Bulacan location of Binwagan have been questioned by local Laguna historian Tiongson (2006) |
| Dang Hwan Nayaka Tuhan Pailah | Ganashakti(uncertain) | Probable person-name mentioned in the Laguna Copperplate Inscription, as the representative of Jayadewa, Lord Minister of "Pailah" | c. 900 AD | Translation of the Laguna Copperplate Inscription by Antoon Postma | Postma's conclusions about the Bulacan location of Pailah have been questioned by local Laguna historian Tiongson (2006) |

== See also ==
- Pila, Laguna
- Laguna Copperplate Inscription
- Jayadewa
- Tondo (historical polity)
- Maynila (historical polity)
- Bay, Laguna
