= Jayadewa =

Jayadeva
- Dang Hwan Nāyaka Tuhan Pailah
- Reign: c. 900 CE
- Spouse: Dayang Bukah
Names
- Dang Hwan Nāyaka Tuhan Pailah 𑼣𑼁 𑼲𑽂𑼮𑼥𑽂𑼥𑼴𑼫𑼒 𑼡𑼸𑼲𑼴𑼥𑽁 𑼦𑼿𑼭𑼃 𑼙𑼫𑼣𑼾𑼮
- House: Pailah

Jayadewa or Jayadeva (Old Javanese: 𑼙𑼫𑼣𑼾𑼮; full title: Dang Hwan Nāyaka tuhan Pailah Jayadewa) was the name of the Senapati of Tundun and the Lord of Pailah at the time that the Laguna Copperplate Inscription was written in c. 900 CE. According to the document, he served as the "Commander in Chief" (Malay: pamegat senāpati di Tundun) who pardoned the descendants of an individual named Namwaran of his debts. Although no other records describe his life and works, Jayadewa is an important figure in Philippine historiography because he is one of the persons clearly identified in the LCI, which is the earliest known written document found in the Philippines.

== Personal life ==
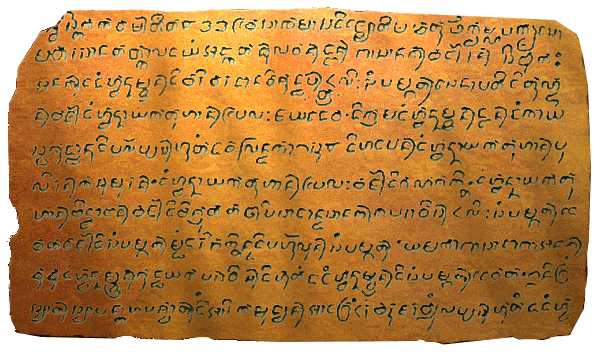
The Laguna Copperplate Inscription (c. 900 CE), which mentions a person named Jayadewa as the ruler of Tondo at that time.

He married Dayang Bukah, as in exchange to clear the debit of 1 kati and 8 suwarnas of Bukah's parents which is Namwaran and Dayang Angkatan.

"On this occasion, Lady Angkatan, and her brother, Buka, the children of the Honourable Namwaran, were awarded a complete pardon from the Commander in Chief of Tundún, represented by the Lord Minister of Pailáh, Jayadewa."

== See also ==
- Laguna Copperplate Inscription (LCI) - the oldest written document in the Philippines
- Senapati - a Sanskrit title and rank for an Admiral or General
- List of sovereign state leaders in the Philippines
- List of ancient Philippine consorts
