= Sanmalan =

Precolonial kingdom in the Philippines

Locations of pre-colonial principalities, polities, kingdoms and sultanates in the Philippine archipelago

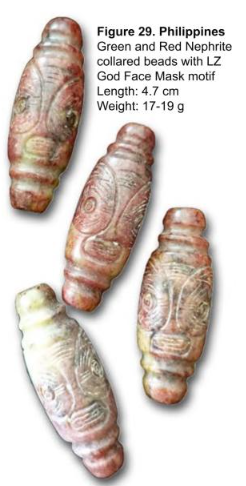
Various Green-Red Nephrite Jade beads used as money, found in the Philippines, the Kingdom of Sanmalan like its neighboring polities is presumed to use this as one of its currencies.

The polity of Sanmalan is a precolonial Philippine state centered on what is now Zamboanga. The capital may have been located in modern-day Zamboanga City, which is part of the ancestral land of the indigenous Subanon people, who were the majority in the Zamboanga peninsula at the time.

It was mentioned in Chinese annals as "Sanmalan" (三麻蘭) and was supposedly ruled over by a Rajah Chulan, who sent the emissary Ali Bakti to the Chinese imperial court in 1011 CE. The tribute presented by Rajah Chulan to the Chinese Emperor included aromatics, dates, glassware, ivory, peaches, refined sugar, and rose- water, which suggests that Sanmalan had trade links into Western Asia.

The later Chinese historical chronicle Zhufan Zhi 諸蕃志 published at 1225; wrote once again about Sanmalan but it was now known as Shahuagong. In contrast to its previous mention as a trade emporium, it became a pirate-state driven by slave raiding.

Many of the people of the country of Shahuagong go out into the open sea on pirate raids. When they take captives, they bind them and sell them to Shepo (Java) (as slaves)

— ~Zhufan zhi 1225

When the Spanish arrived, they gave protectorate status to the ancient semi-independent Sanmalan which was before them, was previously a protectorate of the Sultanate of Sulu. Under Spanish rule, the location of Sanmalan received Mexican and Peruvian military immigrants. After a rebellion against Spanish rule, the state that replaced Spain and had subsisted on what was once Sanmalan's location, was the short-lived Republic of Zamboanga.
