= Kumintang (historical polity) =

Philippine historical polity

Kumintang ᜃᜓᜋᜒᜈ᜔ᜆᜅ᜔
- Unknown–1581
- Capital: Kumintang
- Common languages: Batangas Tagalog
- Ethnic groups: Tagalog
- Religion: Tagalog polytheism
- Government: Precolonial barangay under the rule of a paramount datu
  - Unknown-1581: Gat Pulintan
- History
  - Established: Unknown
  - Arrival of Spanish missionaries into Batangas: 1572
  - Christianization of Kumintang: 1581
Succeeded by
Captaincy General of the Philippines; Balayan
- Today part of: Philippines

Kumintang (Baybayin: ᜃᜓᜋᜒᜈ᜔ᜆᜅ᜔) or Comintan in Spanish orthography, was a precolonial Philippine polity (bayan) situated north of the modern-day downtown of Batangas City in Southern Luzon, around the Calumpang River. Its inhabitants were the Tagalog people, and was also claimed to be the place of origin of the song “Kumintang”. Its most commonly known ruler was a legendary figure known as Gat Pulintan, the paramount datu of the region.

== Etymology ==
Sixteenth, seventeenth and eighteenth century historical narratives of early chroniclers referred to Kumintang not as a musical form, but as a “kingdom” centered around present-day Batangas City. Batangas is still referred to poetically as Kumintang to this day. However, as time went on, the term ‘kumintang’ became associated more with the song. The original meaning of the term remains to be unknown and evidence remains inconclusive.

=== Kumintang as a song ===
According to folklore, it was said that the Spanish missionaries could only communicate to the natives through hand signs, and because he and the soldiers had no way of communicating to the people to ask the name of the place, they decided to call it “Kumintang”, after the “melodious song sung everywhere by the natives”. The folklore however, did not state as to how the Spaniards knew that the song was called kumintang.

The term kumintang was often used in the twentieth century urban music circles as a long lost, archaic song of the Tagalogs, that expressed deep emotions and longing, often describing the beauty of nature and the pain of love.

Kumintang as a song or as a type of song was also mentioned in a 1691 Spanish document from the Ventura del Arco MSS, where it was mentioned that there are ‘several comintans’.

Sixteenth, seventeenth and eighteenth century historical narratives of early chroniclers, however, referred to Kumintang not as a musical form, but as a “kingdom” centered around present-day Batangas City.

== Customs ==
Like the nearby tribes, the early people of Batangan or Kumintang were described to be non-aggressive peoples, partly because most of the tribes in the immediate environs were related to them by blood. However, during war, they used bakyang (bows and arrows), the bangkaw (spears) and the suwan (bolo).

Similar to their neighbors, the people of Kumintang were highly superstitious and made use of amulets (talisman). The people believed in the presence of higher beings and other things unseen. Thus, there was a strong connection between the people and nature.

They also made frequent use of domestic cattles to deliver their goods, and are producers of many cotton hoses. Spanish accounts described them to be ‘healthier and more clever than others’.

== History ==
=== The story of Gat Pulintan ===
In an oral tradition recorded by Fr. Joaquin Martinez de Zuñiga (1893), Gat Pulintan ruled over the places around Bulaquin (modern-day Bulakin), Magsalacot, and from the Labasin River and Panghayaan, with the former three being located on or near modern-day San Pablo in Laguna while Panghayaan was described to be located in Batangas. Gat Pulintan was also described to be always at war with his neighbors.

According to the National Library of the Philippines archives, supposedly an old oral tradition from Batangas, the old ruler of Kumintang was said to be Gat Pulintan, a brave chieftain and a paramount datu in the region. One day, a Spanish missionary in 1572 went to visit Gat Pulintan, only to find Gat Pulintan absent from his home. However, the Spanish missionary met Princess Kumintang, the daughter of the datu. It was said that the Spanish missionary was so impressed by her beauty that he paid homage to her by kneeling and addressed her as a princess. After the Christianization of Kumintang in 1581, Gat Pulintan and Princess Kumintang fled to the hills to resist the Spanish occupation.

Centuries later, Gat Pulintan was mentioned in the “Vocabulario de la lengua Tagala” (1754) by Juan de Noceda as Gat Polintan, who was described to be an ancient ruler. He was also mentioned erroneously as Gat Pulentang, who was the ‘ruler of Bulacan’ by Luis Camara Dery.

=== The story of Datu Kumintang ===
According to the Maragtas by Pedro Alcantara Monteclaro of Miagao, Iloilo, after the settlement of the Ten Bornean Datus, some datus left Malandog to head towards Batangas, one of whom was Datu Balensuela. (Note: Datu Balensuela is sometimes spelled as Balensusa.) The book also claimed that these datus were the primogenitors of the Tagalog people. Folk stories in Batangas added that Datu Balensuela established a settlement in Batangas, and later bequeathed it to a leader named Datu Kumintang, in which the settlement or region was named in his honor. However, the historicity of the Maragtas is either disputed or dismissed by many scholars as a mere legend, and linguistic evidence such as the works of linguist David Zorc state that the origins of the Tagalogs may not have come from Panay, but from Eastern Visayas or Northeastern Mindanao.

=== Spanish accounts ===
In 1570, Spanish generals Martín de Goiti and Juan de Salcedo explored the coasts of Batangas and found numerous settlements, but mainly around the Pansipit River in Taal, which they called Bonbon. In 1571, a large chunk of land from the lake called Bonbon all the way to Batangan was given as an encomienda (repartimiento) to Martín de Goiti, who led the first Spanish expedition to explore Batangas and Luzon in 1570 under the orders of Miguel López de Legazpi. Kumintang was later founded as the town of Batangan on 8 December 1581 by Spanish missionaries under Balayan Province. It was christened Batangan due to the presence of numerous big logs, which were called “batang” by the locals. However the name was not yet official. On the same year, the Batangas parish was founded under Fr. Diego Mexica. In 1601, the renaming of Kumintang into Batangan became official, with Don Agustin Casulao as its first gobernadorcillo.

== See also ==
- Batangas
- Batangas City
- Balayan
- Tondo (historical polity)
- Maynila (historical polity)
- Namayan
