= Pila, Laguna =

Municipality in Laguna, Philippines

Pila
- Municipality
- Municipality of Pila
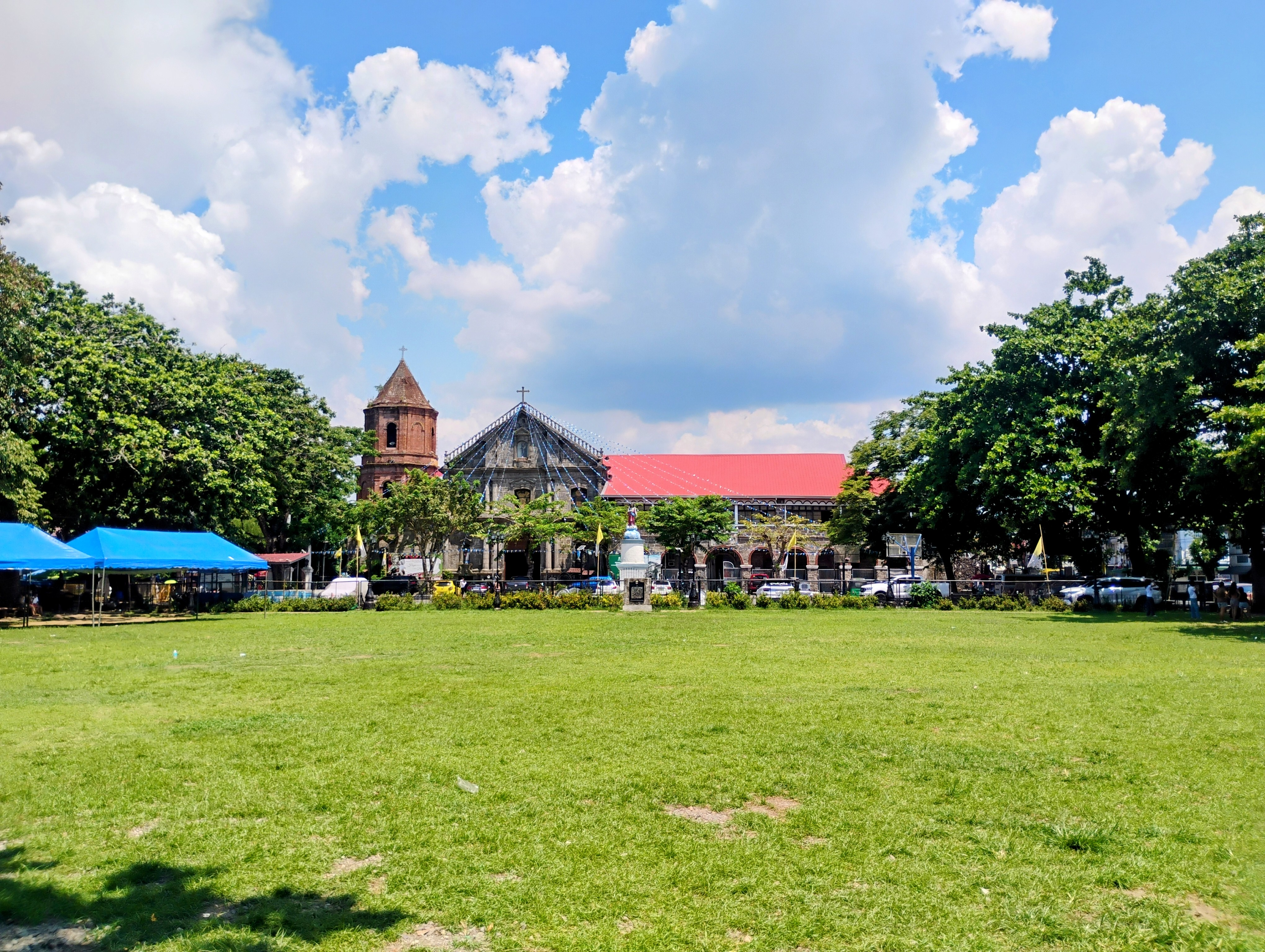
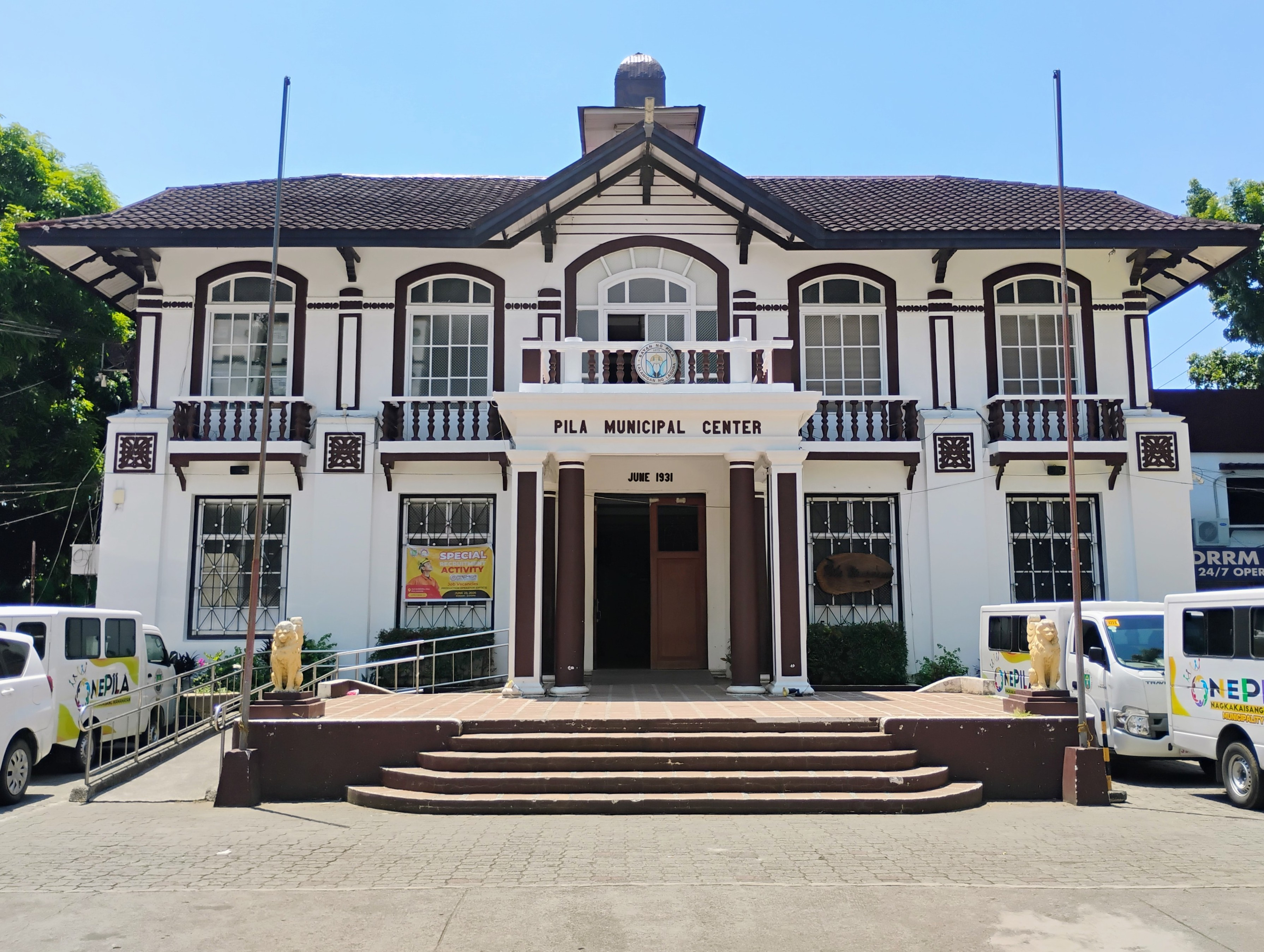
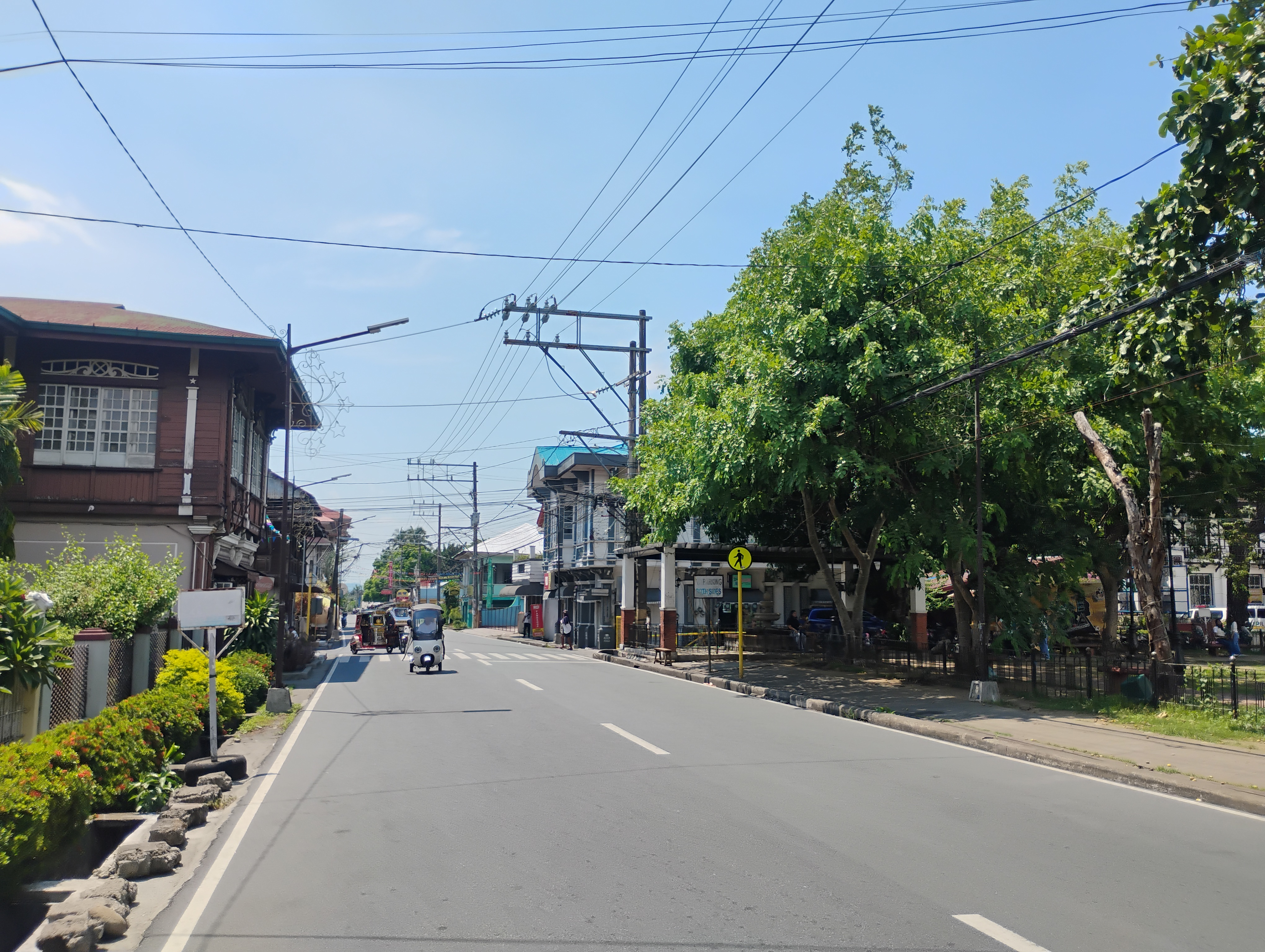
- Pila Church & Town Plaza Pila Municipal Hall Pila Town Proper

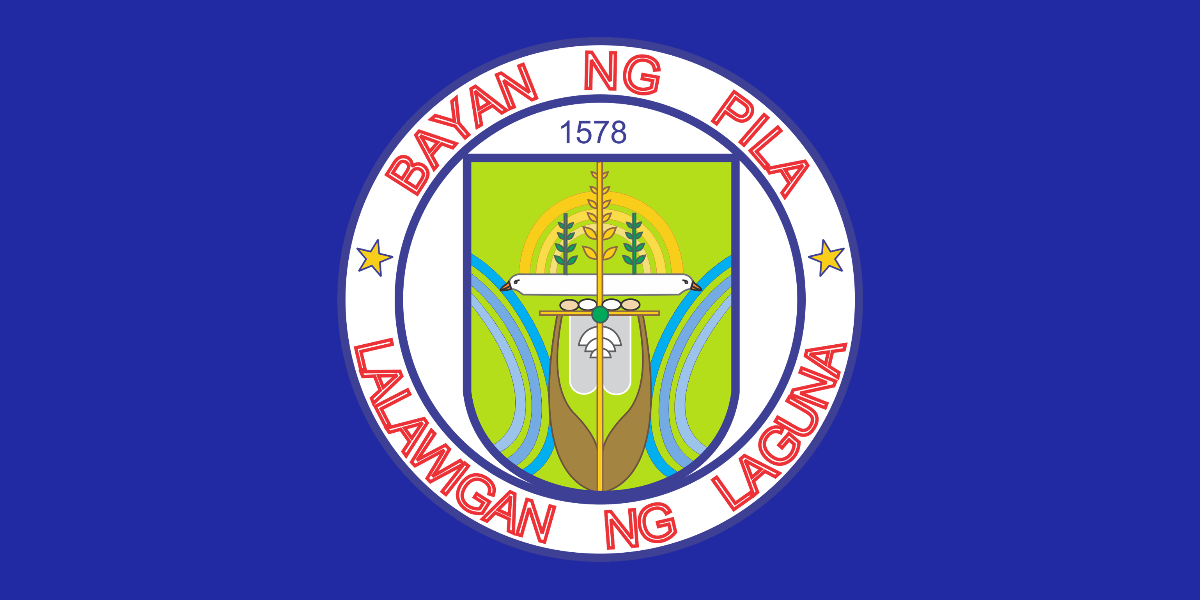
- Flag Seal
- Nickname: La Noble Villa de Pila
- Map of Laguna with Pila highlighted
- Interactive map of Pila
- Location within the Philippines
- Coordinates: 14°14′N 121°22′E
- Country: Philippines
- Region: Calabarzon
- Province: Laguna
- District: 4th district
- Founded: July 29, 1578
- Barangays: 17 (see Barangays)

Government
  - Type: Sangguniang Bayan
  - Mayor: Queen Marilyd S. Alarva
  - Vice Mayor: Edgardo A. Ramos
  - Representative: Benjamin C. Agarao Jr.
  - Municipal Council: Members: Carlito S. Magpily; Virgillo Jay G. Relova; Dr. Rosauro R. Framil MD; Loreto B. Ordoñez; Florentino M. Vergara Jr.; Delilah M. Gonzales; Ronald N. Herradura; Apolo H. Del Rio Jr.
  - Electorate: 39,713 voters (2025)

Area
  - Total: 31.20 km^{2} (12.05 sq mi)
- Elevation: 14 m (46 ft)
- Highest elevation: 95 m (312 ft)
- Lowest elevation: 1 m (3.3 ft)

Population (2024 census)
  - Total: 57,776
  - Density: 1,852/km^{2} (4,796/sq mi)
  - Households: 13,440

Economy
  - Income class: 1st municipal income class
  - Poverty incidence: 9.81% (2023)
  - Revenue: ₱ 272.1 million (2024)
  - Assets: ₱ 493.3 million (2024)
  - Expenditure: ₱ 92.84 million (2024)
  - Liabilities: ₱ 91.77 million (2024)

Service provider
  - Electricity: Manila Electric Company (Meralco)
- Time zone: UTC+8 (PST)
- ZIP code: 4010
- PSGC: 0403422000
- IDD : area code: +63 (0)49
- Native languages: Tagalog

Pila, officially the Municipality of Pila (Tagalog: Bayan ng Pila), is a municipality in the province of Laguna, Philippines. According to the 2024 census, it has a population of 57,776 people.

The town is known for some well-preserved houses dating back to the Spanish period, as well as the old Saint Anthony of Padua Parish Church, the first Antonine church in the Philippines.

== History ==
=== Early history ===
Pila and neighboring towns along the shores of Laguna de Bay are regarded by archaeologists as among the oldest settlements in the Philippines. The area forms part of a cluster of communities known to have existed prior to the year 1000. Excavations in Pinagbayanan have yielded pottery and artifacts indicating a well-established settlement during the late Tang dynasty (10th century). Archaeological findings in the area also include ancient horse remains, contributing to the discussion on whether horses were present in the Philippines prior to the Spanish arrival. In addition, what is considered the country’s oldest cremation site was discovered in the same locality. The Laguna Copperplate Inscription, dated 900 A.D., likewise references Pila, recorded as Pailah, and mentions its ruler, Jayadewa, further attesting to the area’s early historical significance.

Pre-Hispanic Pila was one of the biggest barangay domains in Southern Luzon. Its leader was not only the local chief but also the regional datu. The bards of the shore towns of the Morong Peninsula, across the lake from Pila, sang of the exploits of Gat Salyan Maguinto, the "gold-rich" datu of Pila, who extended his kingdom far and wide into their settlements. In fact, the greater territory was also called Pila. Wary of concentrating power on a noble Indio, the conquistadors later dismantled his realm. To avoid confusion, they changed the name of the Pila dependencies to Pililla, which means "minor Pila." The original territory had encompassed the present towns of Morong (from which the town of Pililla or Pilang Morong separated in 1583), Baras (separated from Morong in 1588), Tanay (separated from Pililla in 1606), Jala-jala, whose old name was also Pila (separated from Pililla in 1786) and Talim Island, which, until now, has a sitio named Pila. The descendants of Gat Salyan were also regarded as the founders of the other towns of the present province of Rizal.

Around 1375, due to a weather calamity, most probably flooding, the original seat of Pila had to be abandoned and the barangay transferred to Pagalangan, which means "the place of reverence". The Franciscan chronicler, Fray Juan Plasencia, gathered that the datu of Pila, "with his own gold", purchased the new site from another chief who had owned it and thus moved to another place. The datu then farmed out the arable land among the nobles and the freemen who, in return, paid him an annual rent of a hundred ganta of rice.

Even before the coming of the Spaniards, Pila was already noted for its spiritual ambience. The center of the town was known as Pagalangan, which means "The Place of Reverence."

=== Spanish colonial era ===
In 1571, the Spanish conquistadors, led by Don Juan de Salcedo, "discovered" Pila in Pagalangan after the "pacification" of Manila. On November 14 of the same year, Miguel Lopez de Legazpi, the first Spanish governor-general, awarded the encomienda (tributes) of Pagalangan and other Laguna villages to Don Francisco de Herrera, a regidor (councilman) of Manila. With the reorganization of the encomiendas in 1575, the tributes of Pila were granted to Don Hernando Ramirez on July 29.

The Franciscans arrived in 1578 to evangelize the people of Pila and afterwards built a church dedicated to St. Anthony of Padua, the first Antonine house of worship in the Philippines. Due to the nobleness and mildness of the character of its inhabitants, the Spanish leadership honored the town with the exceptional title La Noble Villa de Pila, one of five villas named by the Spaniards in the 16th and 17th centuries in the Philippines. During this period, the demesne of Pila included Victoria, Laguna, and Jala-Jala, Rizal.

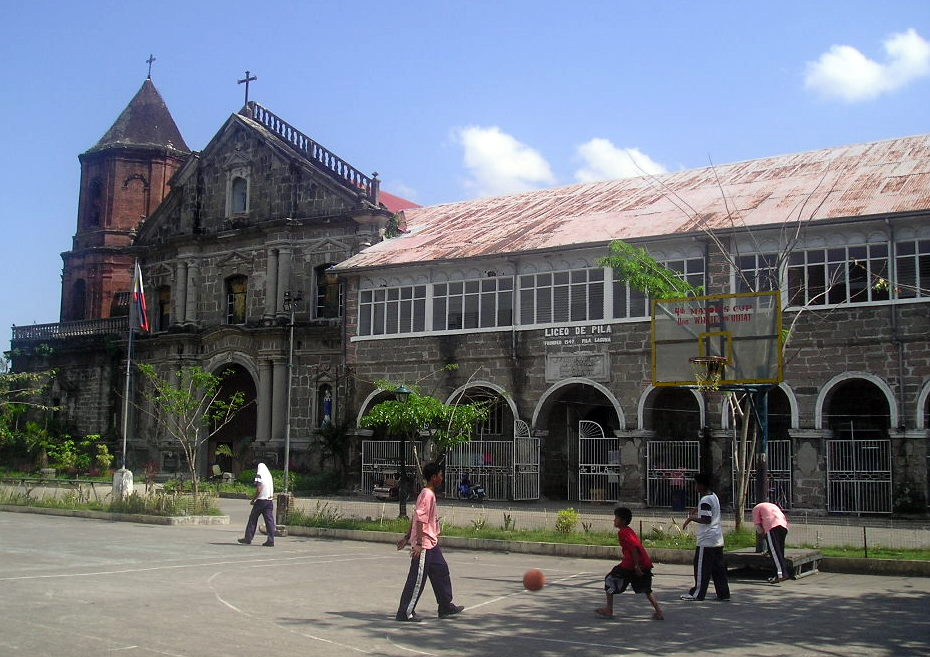
Church of Pila, built in 1849

The Franciscans established the second printing press in the Philippines in Pila in 1611 under the auspices of Tomas Pinpin and Domingo Loag. In 1613, the press printed the Philippines’ oldest dictionary and the first book printed using movable type, the Vocabulario de la Lengua Tagala. The book was written and compiled by Fray Pedro de San Buenaventura and printed by Tomas Pinpin, the Prince of Filipino printers. The book is twenty-seven years older than the Bay Psalm Book, the first book printed in the United States in 1640. The 1818 Spanish census recorded the area having 1,117 native families and 3 Spanish-Filipino families.

At the beginning of the 19th century, the town was transferred from Pagalangan to the present site of Santa Clara due to perennial flooding.

=== Post-colonial era ===
In 1949, the barrios of Bancabanca, Daniw, Masapang, Nanhaya, San Benito, San Felix, San Francisco, and San Roque were excised from Pila to form the new independent municipality of Victoria by virtue of Executive Order No. 282.

In 1957, the sitio of Pinagbayanan was converted into a barrio, by virtue of Republic Act No. 1689.

== Geography ==
Pila is 8 kilometers (5.0 mi) from Santa Cruz and 79 kilometers (49 mi) from Manila.

=== Barangays ===
Pila is politically subdivided into 17 barangays, as indicated in the matrix below. Each barangay consists of puroks and some have sitios.

- Aplaya
- Bagong Pook
- Bukal
- Bulilan Norte (Poblacion)
- Bulilan Sur (Poblacion)
- Concepcion
- Labuin
- Linga
- Masico
- Mojon
- Pansol
- Pinagbayanan
- San Antonio
- San Miguel
- Santa Clara Norte (Poblacion)
- Santa Clara Sur (Poblacion)
- Tubuan

=== Climate ===
Climate data for Pila, Laguna
Month	Jan	Feb	Mar	Apr	May	Jun	Jul	Aug	Sep	Oct	Nov	Dec	Year
Mean daily maximum °C (°F)	26 (79)	27 (81)	29 (84)	31 (88)	31 (88)	30 (86)	29 (84)	29 (84)	29 (84)	29 (84)	28 (82)	26 (79)	29 (84)
Mean daily minimum °C (°F)	22 (72)	22 (72)	22 (72)	23 (73)	24 (75)	25 (77)	24 (75)	24 (75)	24 (75)	24 (75)	24 (75)	23 (73)	23 (74)
Average precipitation mm (inches)	58 (2.3)	41 (1.6)	32 (1.3)	29 (1.1)	91 (3.6)	143 (5.6)	181 (7.1)	162 (6.4)	172 (6.8)	164 (6.5)	113 (4.4)	121 (4.8)	1,307 (51.5)
Average rainy days	13.4	9.3	9.1	9.8	19.1	22.9	26.6	24.9	25.0	21.4	16.5	16.5	214.5
Source: Meteoblue

== Demographics ==
Population census of Pila
Year	Pop.	±% p.a.
1903	6,040	—
1918	6,917	+0.91%
1939	10,171	+1.85%
1948	13,606	+3.29%
1960	11,156	−1.64%
1970	15,551	+3.37%
1975	18,399	+3.43%
1980	20,962	+2.64%
1990	27,467	+2.74%
1995	31,251	+2.45%
2000	37,427	+3.94%
2007	44,227	+2.33%
2010	46,534	+1.87%
2015	50,289	+1.49%
2020	54,613	+1.75%
2024	57,776	+1.36%
Source: Philippine Statistics Authority

In the 2024 census, the population of Pila was 57,776 people, with a density of 1,900 inhabitants per square kilometer or 4,900 inhabitants per square mile.

== Economy ==
Poverty incidence of Pila (%)

Source: Philippine Statistics Authority

== Tourism ==
The National Historical Institute of the Philippines (now the National Historical Commission of the Philippines) declared the town plaza and surrounding ancestral houses a National Historical Landmark on May 17, 2000, by NHI Resolution No. 2 series of 2000. It cited Pila as an early pre-Hispanic center of culture and trade in Laguna known as La Noble Villa de Pila, and has been recognized as one of the country's more important archeological sites where clay potteries were discovered through excavations conducted in Pinagbayanan in 1967. The historic town of Pila is bounded by General Luna Street in the north, M. H. del Pilar Street in the east, Mabini Street in the south, and Bonifacio Street in the west, including the Pila Elementary School and the Juan Fuentes and Santiago Fernandez house.

On July 9, 2002, the Roman Catholic Diocese of San Pablo proclaimed the parish church of San Antonio de Padua de Pila as the Diocesan Shrine of St. Anthony. According to Philippine historian, Dr. Luciano Santiago, it is the only town in the Philippines formally recognized as a historical site by both the church and the state.

=== National Shrine of San Antonio de Padua ===
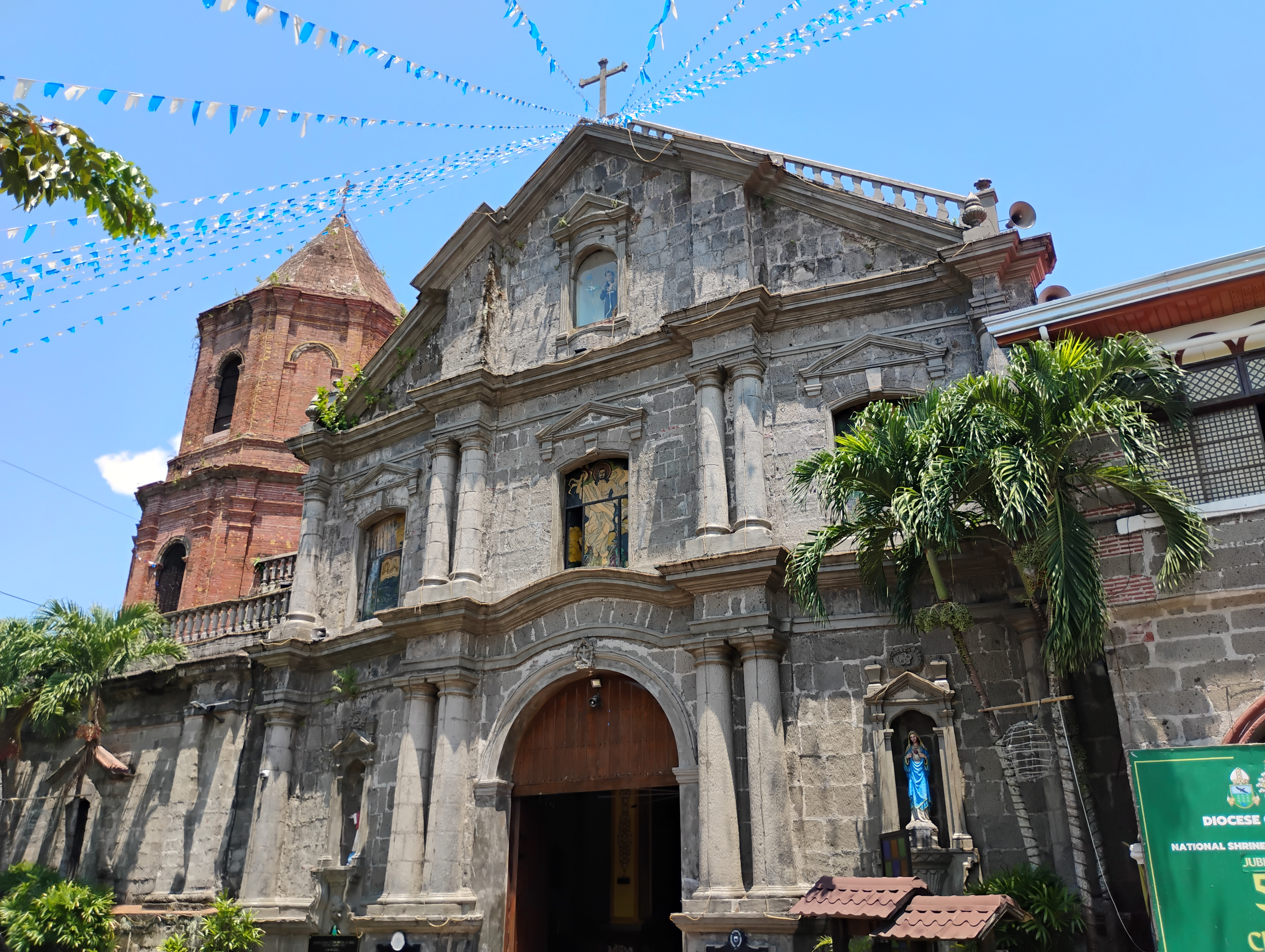
Facade of the San Antonio de Padua Parish in Pila, Laguna

Formerly the San Antonio de Padua Parish Church, the original Pila church was built in Pagalangan in 1578 with Rev. Juan de Florencia serving as its first priest. The whole structure, including the convent, was completed in 1618. The church was then transferred to its present location in the town square in 1800 due to frequent flooding in the original town center. The church's transfer and reconstruction were completed along with the convent in 1849. However, both were severely damaged by an earthquake in 1880. It was once more built in the early 19th century after the damage caused by the earthquake. The church was spared from the ravages of World War II.

Pila Church is among the newest churches in Laguna. This is evident in its strong stone structure. Its red bell tower is one of its distinguishable features. The church is dedicated to Saint Anthony of Padua, and it was declared by the Pontificate of Pope John Paul II as the Diocesan Shrine of the said saint on July 9, 2002. Inside, wood is prominently seen as the material of choice for the chairs and altar. The altar is a massive structure that holds a relic of St. Anthony's garment.

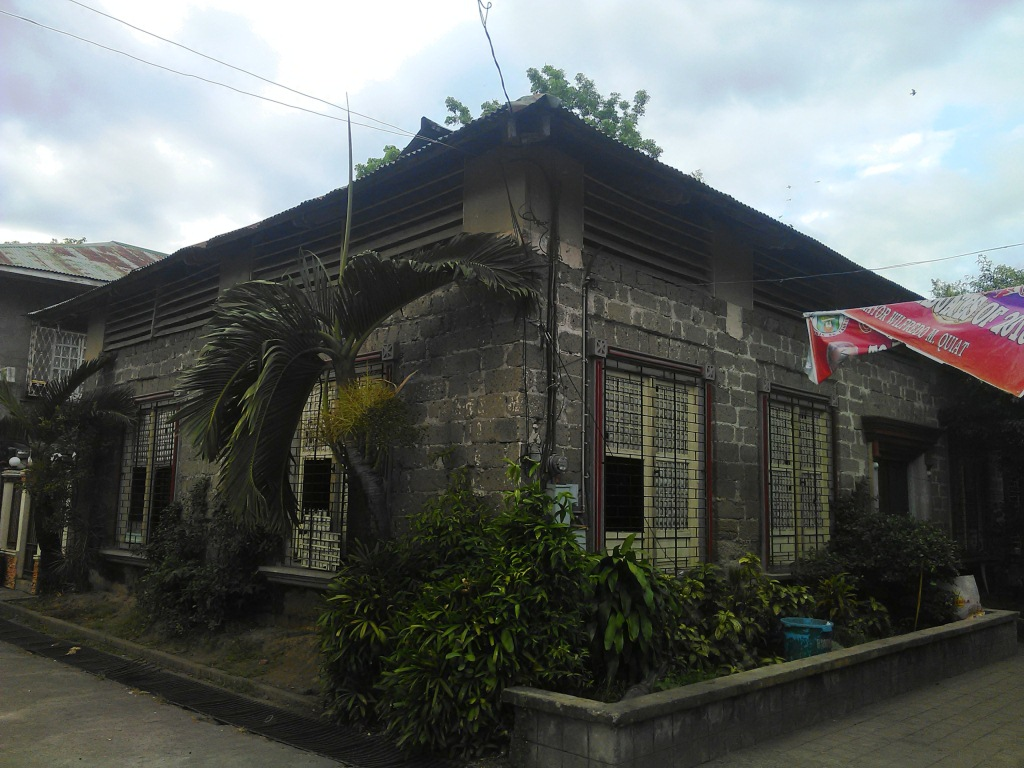
Pila Museum

=== Pila Museum ===
Pila Museum is one of the Municipal Museums in Laguna, the other one being in Paete. The museum is under the direct jurisdiction of the office of the mayor of Pila. It was built through the efforts of the Pila Historical Society Foundation, a group of concerned citizens that seeks to preserve the cultural heritage of Pila. The museum was built on November 10, 1993, from funds raised by the foundation. The foundation was also responsible for securing the declaration of the town as a National Historical Landmark. The declaration, granted in 2000, was formalized via the installation of a landmark in the middle of the open field adjacent to the museum on December 4, 2007, with former president Fidel V. Ramos as the guest of honor.

It occupies part of the Pila Elementary School with an area of about 50 square meters. The majority of what is contained within include artifacts dating from the Chinese period, such as jars, plates and jugs. The rest of the exhibit consists of American-period appliances like sewing machines, Bakelite telephones and adding machines. Most of the Chinese-period artifacts were dug from the Pinagbayanan Crematorium, while others were donated by old families in the town.

The Elizalde family donated 250 to 300 specimens to the museum, and the museum itself was also donated by them. The museum's contents were transferred to a heritage building in 1994. Some of the specimens given include celadon dishes with fish motifs, Qingbai and blue and white jarlets, lead-glazed water droppers and teapots, carabao figurines, brown wares, iron and glass bracelets, and gold or copper colored beads and earrings.

=== Old Ancestral Houses ===
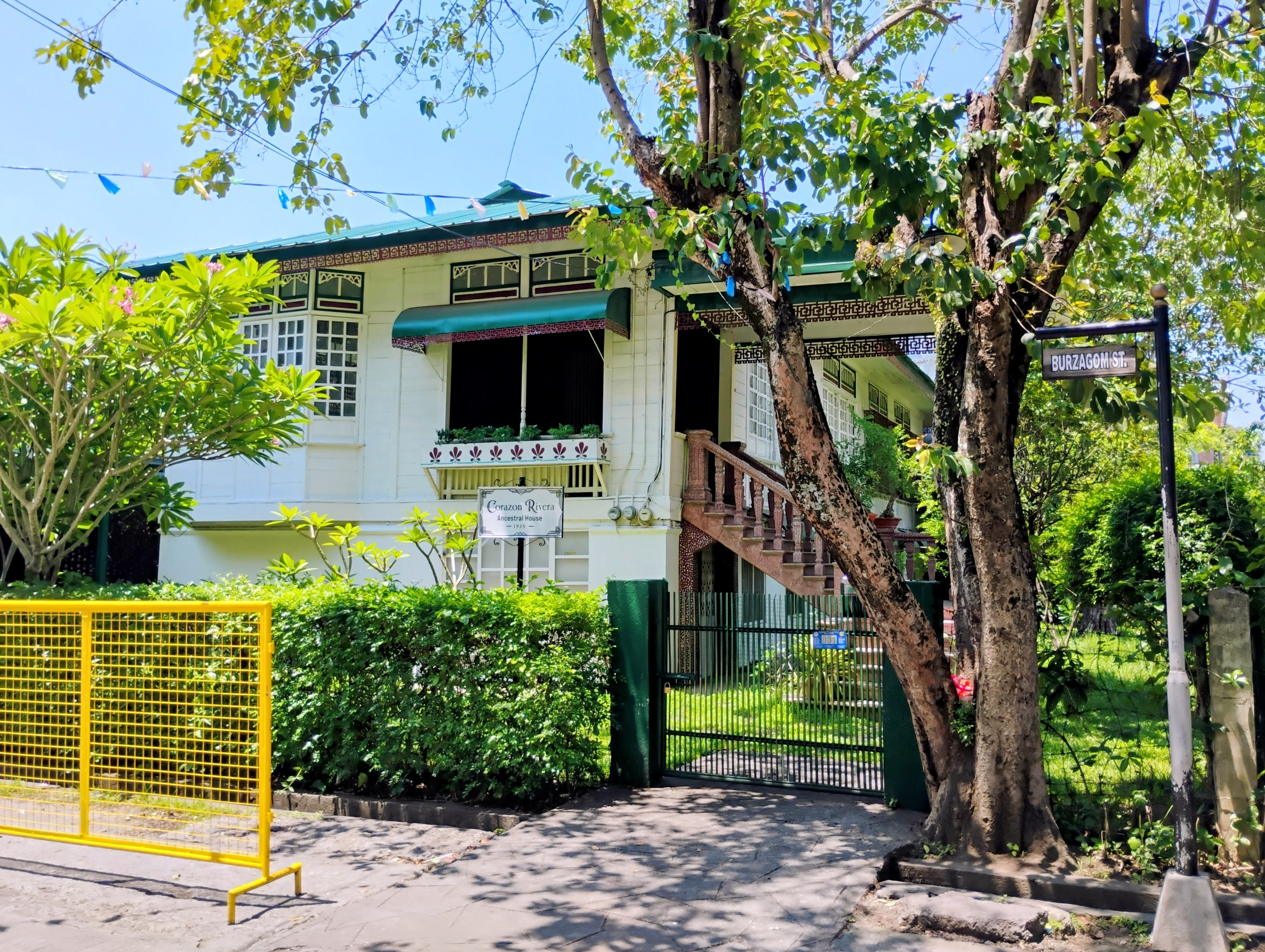
Corazon Rivera Ancestral House

It is a common misconception that the old ancestral houses are Hispanic in design. According to the town's curator and tourism officer, however, these houses were built during the early American period. A number of them are still in pristine condition, preserved by the descendants of the houses' original owners, while some have been converted into shops and cafés. A majority of the houses within the site are derelict, but the town officials are taking action to restore these architectural treasures.

Some of the old ancestral houses include the Casto Maceda / Concha Monserrat house, Corazon Rivera House, Jose Agra / Rosario Villarica house and Teodora Alava House.

== Government ==
=== Municipal Hall ===
The Pila Municipal Hall is a small and quaint structure right in front of the Pila Church. It is distinguishable by its white paint scheme, red-tiled roof and brown pillars. Outside is a statue of Rizal standing guard in remembrance of the national hero. The hall has been situated there since 1931 and has repeatedly been renovated.

The open field in front of the hall serves as a waiting spot for those with appointments to the mayor or any public official. Parking space is adequate, and tricycles parked near the hall can be easily hailed to go about town.

As with any municipal hall, it houses the local post office, the assessor's office, the local internal revenue office and the health center. Unlike most municipal halls, the office of the tourism officer is not located within the hall, but is stationed at the Pila Museum.

== Archaeology ==
Esso Standard Philippines and Elizalde Family Project funded an archaeological project along Laguna de Bay. It was supervised by Dr. Robert Fox and Avelino Legaspi of the Anthropology Department of the National Museum.

In total, there were ten excavations from May to October 1967. Talim Island, Balibago, and Rizal were the first to be excavated. It was followed by Pinagbayanan and Bagong Pook. Pila and Lumban were the last sites to be excavated. Three of the four sites mentioned exposed 153 graves, ranging from the 12th to the 15th centuries.

=== Access to trade ===
As a place situated along Laguna de Bay, Pila was an accessible area for foreign trade. Vessels filled with merchants carrying goods and services traded with the locals for their products.

Since Laguna de Bay is connected to Manila Bay, past trade covered a wide geographical area.

The items retrieved from the area were of very good quality and expensive-looking. This indicates that the people who once lived in Pila were wealthy.

=== Cremation activities ===
Professor H. Otley Beyer pointed out that cremation was once practised in Novaliches. In Pila's case, the team members found traces of cremation practice in the site. In their data, 40% of the cremated remains were found to be buried in soil, and the remaining 60% were found in medium-sized jars.

In Pinagbayanan, the cremation burials were secondary burials. In the first phase, the body is left alone to decompose. It is then followed by a ritual performance. The body is burned because, according to the belief of ancient people, the "spirit is as clean as though washed in gold" once the body is set on fire.

=== Stratigraphy of the Pinagbayanan Excavation ===
Six major layers:

1. Thin humus level of light brown soil, banana trees and young coconut trees are planted
2. Compact, fine-grained, gray-brown, 10 cm (3.9 in) thickness. No cultural materials found in this layer.
3. Soft black loam rich with organic material, 15–20 cm (5.9–7.9 in) below the surface. Sherds were also found here. Also, cremation burials and postholes were found, that is why it is thought of that this area was home for the ancient people and burial site. Animal remains of pigs and horses were recovered. A C14 date of 1375+-25 bp was obtained on a ceremonial burial.
4. Medium-grained, reddish-brown, and sandy clay found in here shows that it is a burial ground. The fourth level is 85 centimeters (33 in).
5. Compact, fine-grained, and sandy clay. Dated as part of the Iron Age.
6. Water table and stable natural soil.

== Education ==
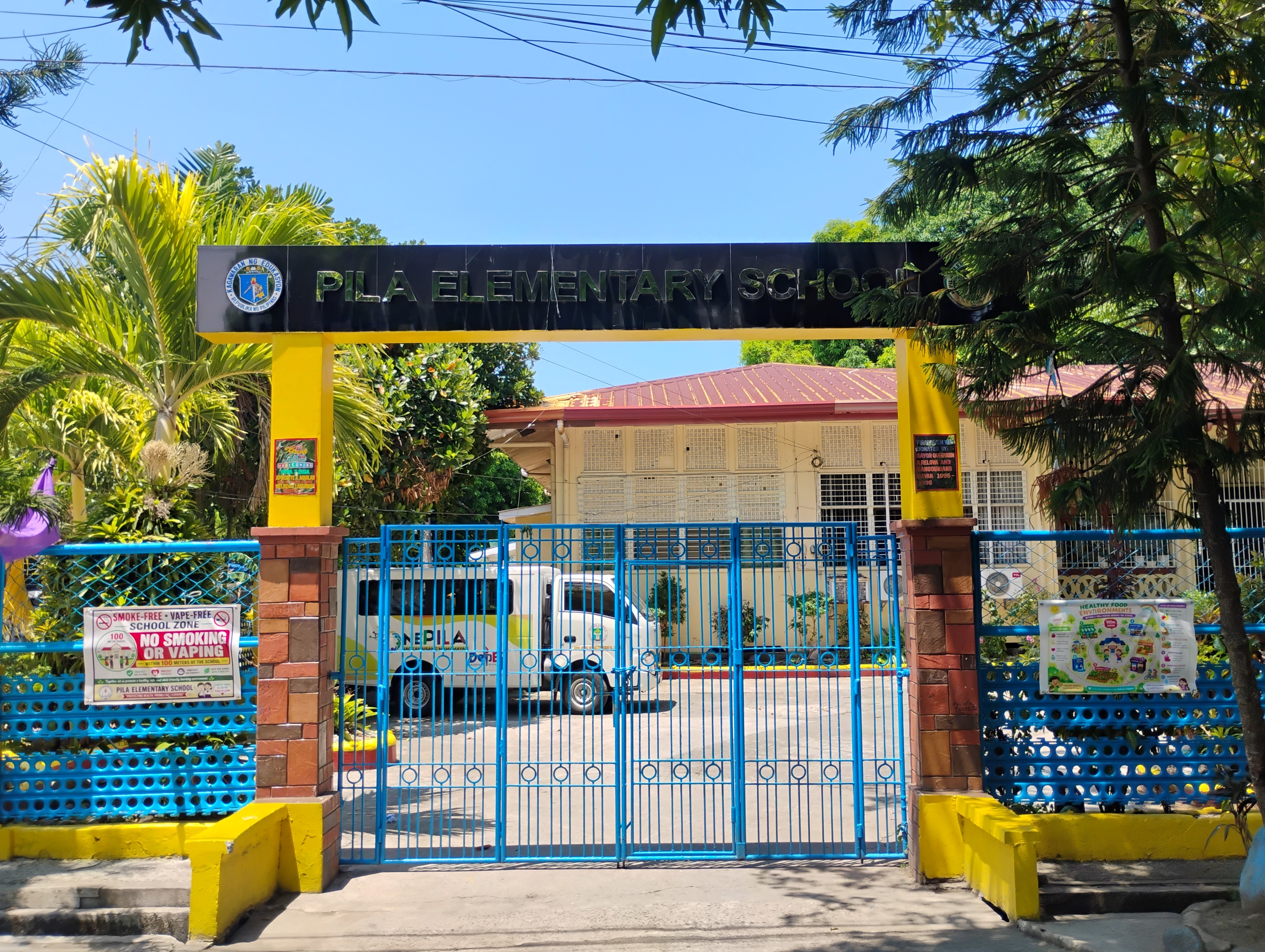
Pila Elementary School

The Pila Schools District Office governs all educational institutions within the municipality. It oversees the management and operations of all private and public schools from the primary to the secondary levels.

=== Primary and elementary schools ===
- Aplaya Elementary School
- Concepcion-Mojon Elementary School
- Jesus Reigns United Methodist Christian School
- Labuin Elementary School
- Linga Elementary School
- Masico Elementary School
- Pansol Elementary School
- Pila Elementary School
- Pinagbayanan Elementary School
- Pook Elementary School
- San Antonio Elementary School
- San Miguel Elementary School
- St. Therese School of Arts & Science
- Tubuan Elementary School

=== Secondary schools ===
- Don Manuel Rivera Memorial National High School
- Linga National High School
- Masico National High School
- Stand Alone Senior High School No. 16
- South Greenville School Inc.

=== Higher educational institutions ===
- Colegio Monterei de Pila Child Development
- Missionary Oratorians of Jesus College
- San Antonio de Padua College

== In popular culture ==
Pila served as a location for the AXN reality show The Amazing Race Asia 2 and as a setting for the ABS-CBN-produced drama series Be Careful with My Heart and Huwag Kang Mangamba.

== Notable people ==
- Marvin Agustin, actor, entrepreneur
- José Maceda, National Artist of the Philippines for Music
- Lorenzo Relova, 103rd Associate Justice of the Supreme Court of the Philippines
