= Antoon Postma =

Dutch anthropologist

Antoon Postma (Hanunó'o: ᜠᜨ᜴ᜦᜳᜨ᜴ ᜩᜳᜰ᜴ᜦ᜴ᜫ Buhid: ᝀᝈ᜔ᝆᝓᝈ᜔ ᝉᝓᝐ᜔ᝆ᜔ᝋ) (28 March 1929 – 22 October 2016) was a Dutch anthropologist who married into and lived among the Hanunuo, a Mangyan sub-tribe in southeastern Mindoro, Philippines. He is best known for being the first to decipher the Laguna Copperplate Inscription, and for documenting the Hanunó'o script, paving the way for its preservation and understanding.

== Early Life and Missionary Work ==
Postma was born in the Netherlands in 1929. In 1958, he arrived in Mindoro as a missionary priest of the Society of the Divine Word. His early years in the Philippines were marked by pastoral work, but he soon developed a deep interest in the culture and traditions of the Mangyan communities he encountered in the early 1960s.

== Work with the Mangyans ==
Postma focused his research on the Buhid and Hanunuo Mangyan syllabic scripts and the ambahan, a traditional poetic form of the Hanunuo Mangyan. Over several decades, he published numerous works on Mangyan poetry, language, and customs.

In 2000, he co-founded the Mangyan Heritage Center in Calapan, Oriental Mindoro, which houses his extensive collection of Mangyan documents, including more than 20,000 ambahans and other poetic forms such as urukay and adahiyo. These materials have since been digitized and preserved.

== Major Contributions ==
One of Postma’s most significant achievements was his decipherment of the Laguna Copperplate Inscription, dated 900 A.D. His commentary, published in Philippine Studies in 1992, provided evidence of complex socio-political and cultural interactions in the archipelago prior to Spanish colonization.

He also brought renewed attention to early Filipino texts, including the Vocabulario Tagalo, the oldest Tagalog-Spanish dictionary compiled from unpublished manuscripts.

== Recognition ==
In March 2009, Queen Beatrix of the Netherlands honored Postma as a Chevalier in the Order of Orange Nassau for his invaluable contributions to cultural preservation and scholarship.

== Sources ==
- Santos, Hector (1995). "Sulat sa Tanso: Antoon Postma's Translation". A Philippine Leaf. Archived from the original on 2008-09-17.
- Sta. Maria, Dina (2009). "Bapa Antoon". Starweek Magazine. The Philippine STAR.
