= Tondo (historical polity) =

City-state in what is now Manila, Philippines, from c. 900 to 1589

Coordinates: 14°37′08″N 120°57′58″E

Tondo Tundun ᜆᜓᜇᜓ
- before 900 (Note: Earliest historical reference.)–1589
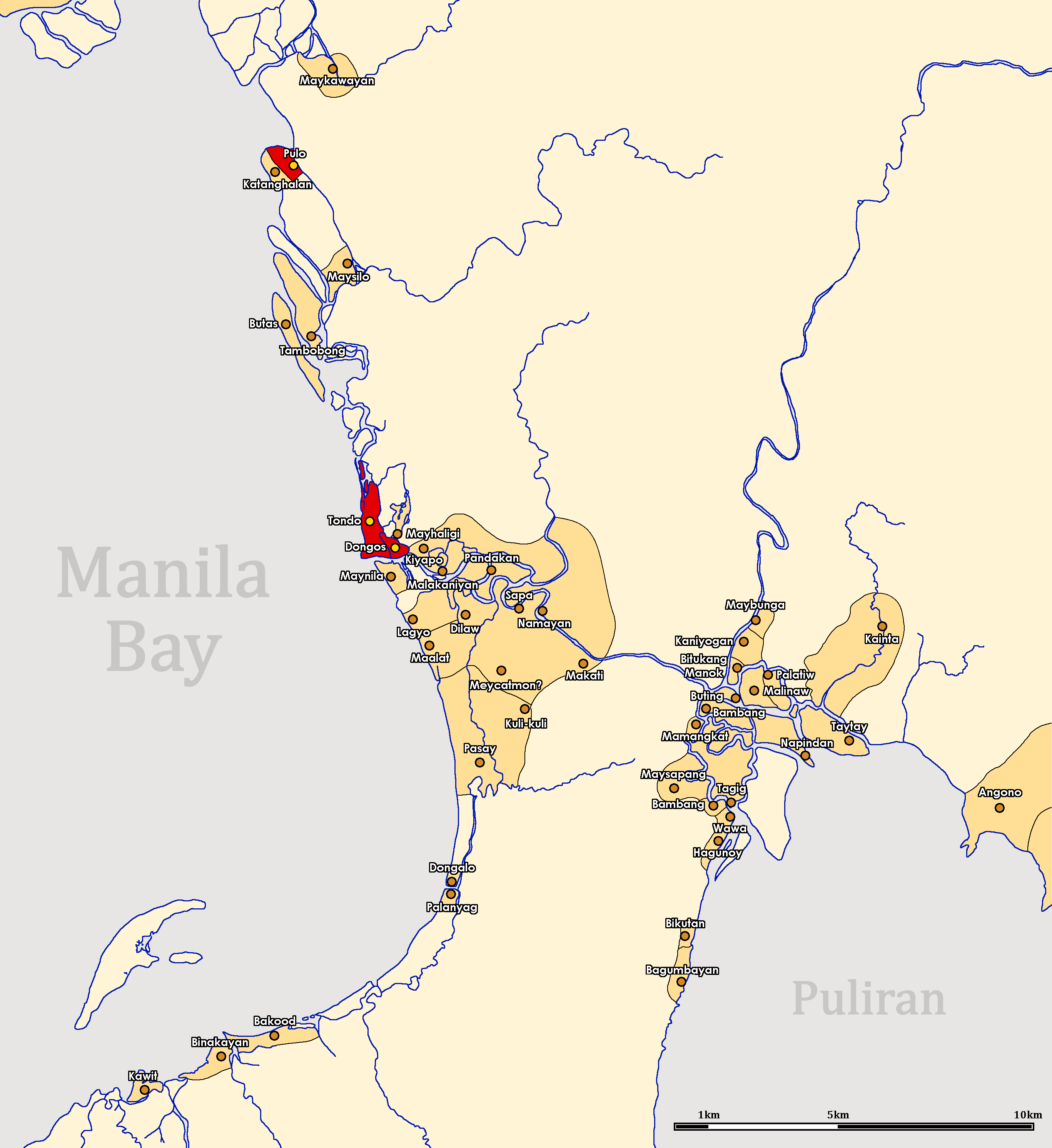
- Location of Tondo (colored red) in 1570.
- Capital: Tondo
- Common languages: Old Tagalog, Kapampangan, and Classical Malay
- Religion: Hinduism; Tantrayana Buddhism; Islam (Note: Practiced by some members of the "Maginoo" caste, the apex social class (Scott, 1994)); Tagalog polytheism
- Government: Feudal bayan ruled by a lakan
- Lakan
  - c. 900: Jayadewa, the Senapati of Tundun and Lord Minister of Pailah (according to a record of debt acquittance)
  - 1450–1500: Gat Lontok and Dayang Kalangitan
  - Late 15th century-1521: Malangsi
  - 1521–1575: Lakandula
  - 1575–1589: Agustin de Legazpi
- Historical era: Antiquity to Early modern (Note: Earliest historical reference.)
  - First historical mention, in the Laguna Copperplate Inscription; trade relations with the Mataram kingdom implied: before 900 (Note: Earliest historical reference.)
  - Various proposed dates for the founding of the neighboring Rajahnate of Maynila range as early as the 1500s (see Battle of Manila (1500)) (Note: Participation as "Tondo" not explicitly mentioned in these oral history): c. 1500s
  - Territorial conflict with Maynila during the reign of Rajah Matanda's mother: early 16th century
  - Fall of Manila: 1570
  - Battle of Bangkusay Channel: 1571
  - Attack of Limahong and concurrent Tagalog revolt of 1574: 1574
  - Discovery of the Tondo Conspiracy, dissolution of indigenous rule, and integration into the Spanish East Indies: 1589
- Currency: Piloncitos, Gold rings, and Barter
Succeeded by
c. 1500; Maynila
1589; Captaincy General of the Philippines
Manila (province)
- Today part of: Philippines

Tondo (Tagalog: [tunˈdo]; Baybayin: ᜆᜓᜇᜓ, Kapampangan: Balen ning Tundo), also popularly known as the Kingdom of Tondo, was a Tagalog and Kapampangan settlement which served as a major trade hub located on the northern part of the Pasig River delta on Luzon Island. Together with Maynila, the polity (bayan) which was also situated on the southern part of the Pasig River delta, Tondo established a shared monopoly on the trade of Chinese goods throughout the rest of the Philippine archipelago, making it an established force in trade throughout Southeast Asia and East Asia.

Tondo is one of the oldest historically documented settlements in the Philippines. It was mentioned in the noble Namvaran's acquittance in 900 AD, also called the Laguna Copperplate Inscription, the oldest extant written document in the Philippines.

Manila, Tondo, and other settlements around Manila Bay and Laguna de Bay saw an influx of travelling Spanish warriors under Spanish royal command starting from 1570.

The Spaniards conspired to conquer the towns of Luzon for the Spanish king starting from the Manila Bay area. The Lusong towns by the Manila Bay only started to capitulate to Spanish rule in 1571, including the traditional city of Manila (now called Intramuros), which was the capital of Luzon, and the town of Tondo. Tondo was afterwards ruled by the Spaniards from Manila.

Tondo's absorption into the Spanish East Indies effectively ended its status as an independent political entity. It only regained sovereignty in the Philippine revolution, and then succumbed again to foreign rule after the American invasion, and has always remained a separate town until 1911 when Tondo was designated as a district of the modern City of Manila.

== History ==
Geographically, the settlement was completely surrounded by bodies of water: mainly the Pasig River to the south and the shore of Manila Bay to the west, but also by several of the delta's rivulets: the Canal de la Reina to the southeast, the Estero de Sunog Apog to the northeast, and the Estero de Vitas on its eastern and northernmost boundaries.

It is referred to in academic circles as the "Tondo polity" or "Tondo settlement", and the earliest Tagalog dictionaries categorized it as a "bayan and Balayan in Kapampangan" (a "city-state", "country" or "polity", lit. '"settlement"').

Early travellers from monarchical cultures who had contacts with Tondo (including the Chinese, Portuguese and the Spanish) often initially referred to it as the "Kingdom of Tondo". Early Augustinian chronicler Pedro de San Buenaventura explained this to be an error as early as 1613 in his Vocabulario de la lengua tagala, but historian Vicente L. Rafael notes that the label was nevertheless later adapted by the popular literature of the Spanish colonial era because Spanish language writers of the time did not have the appropriate words for describing the complex power relations on which Maritime Southeast Asian leadership structures were built. The earliest Spanish accounts referred to Tondo as a smaller settlement compared to the fortified polity of Maynila, a characterization that reflects Spanish perceptions rather than the settlement's actual complexity.

Politically, Tondo was made up of several social groupings, traditionally referred to by historians as barangays, which were led by datus. These datus in turn recognised the leadership of the most senior among them as a sort of "paramount datu" called a lakan over the bayan. In the middle to late 16th century, its lakan was held in high regard within the alliance group which was formed by the various Manila Bay area polities, which included Tondo, Maynila, and various polities in Bulacan and Pampanga. Extrapolating from available data, the demographer-historian Linda A. Newson has estimated that Tondo may have had a population of roughly 43,000 when the Spanish first arrived in 1570.

Culturally, the Kapampangan and Tagalog people of Tondo had a rich Austronesian (specifically Malayo-Polynesian) culture, with its own expressions of language and writing, religion, art, and music dating back to the earliest peoples of the archipelago. This culture was later influenced by its trading relations with the rest of Maritime Southeast Asia. Particularly significant were its relations with Ming dynasty, Malaysia, Brunei, and the Majapahit empire, which served as the main conduit for significant Indian cultural influence, despite the Philippine archipelago's geographical location outside the Indian cultural zone.

== Sources and historiography ==
Only a few comprehensive reviews of source materials for the study of Philippine prehistory and early history have been done, with William Henry Scott's 1968 review being one of the earliest systematic critiques. Scott's review has become a seminal academic work on the study of early Philippine history, having been reviewed early on by a panel of that era's most eminent historians and folklorists including Teodoro Agoncillo, Horacio de la Costa, Marcelino Foronda, Mercedes Grau Santamaria, Nicholas Zafra and Gregorio Zaide. Scott's 1968 review was acknowledged by Laura Lee Junker when she conducted her own comprehensive 1998 review of primary sources regarding archaic Philippine polities, and by F. Landa Jocano in his anthropological analysis of Philippine prehistory.

Scott lists the sources for the study of Philippine prehistory as: archaeology, linguistics and paleogeography, foreign written documents, and quasi-historical genealogical documents. In a later work, he conducts a detailed critique of early written documents and surviving oral or folk traditions connected with the Philippines early historic or protohistoric era.

Sources Scott, Jocano, and Junker consider particularly relevant to the study of the Tondo and Maynila settlements include:

- Malay texts,
- Philippine oral traditions,
- Chinese tributary records and geographies,
- early Spanish writings, and
- archeological evidence from the region around Manila Bay, the Pasig River, and Laguna Lake.

Primary sources for the history of Rajah Kalamayin's Namayan, further upriver, include artifacts dug up from archaeological digs (the earliest of which was Robert Fox's work for the National Museum in 1977) and Spanish colonial records (most notably those compiled by the 19th-century Franciscan historian Fray Felix Huerta).

A more detailed discussion of notable archaeological, documentary, and genealogical sources can be found towards the end of this article.

=== Critical historiography ===
Junker notes that most of the primary written sources for early Philippine history have inherent biases, which creates a need to counter-check their narratives with one another, and with empirical archaeological evidence. She cites the works of F. Landa Jocano, Felix M. Keesing, and William Henry Scott as notable exceptions.

F. Landa Jocano warns that in the case of early Philippine history, it's essential that "even archaeological findings" be carefully interpreted by experts, because these can be misinterpreted if not analyzed in proper context.

== Names and etymology ==
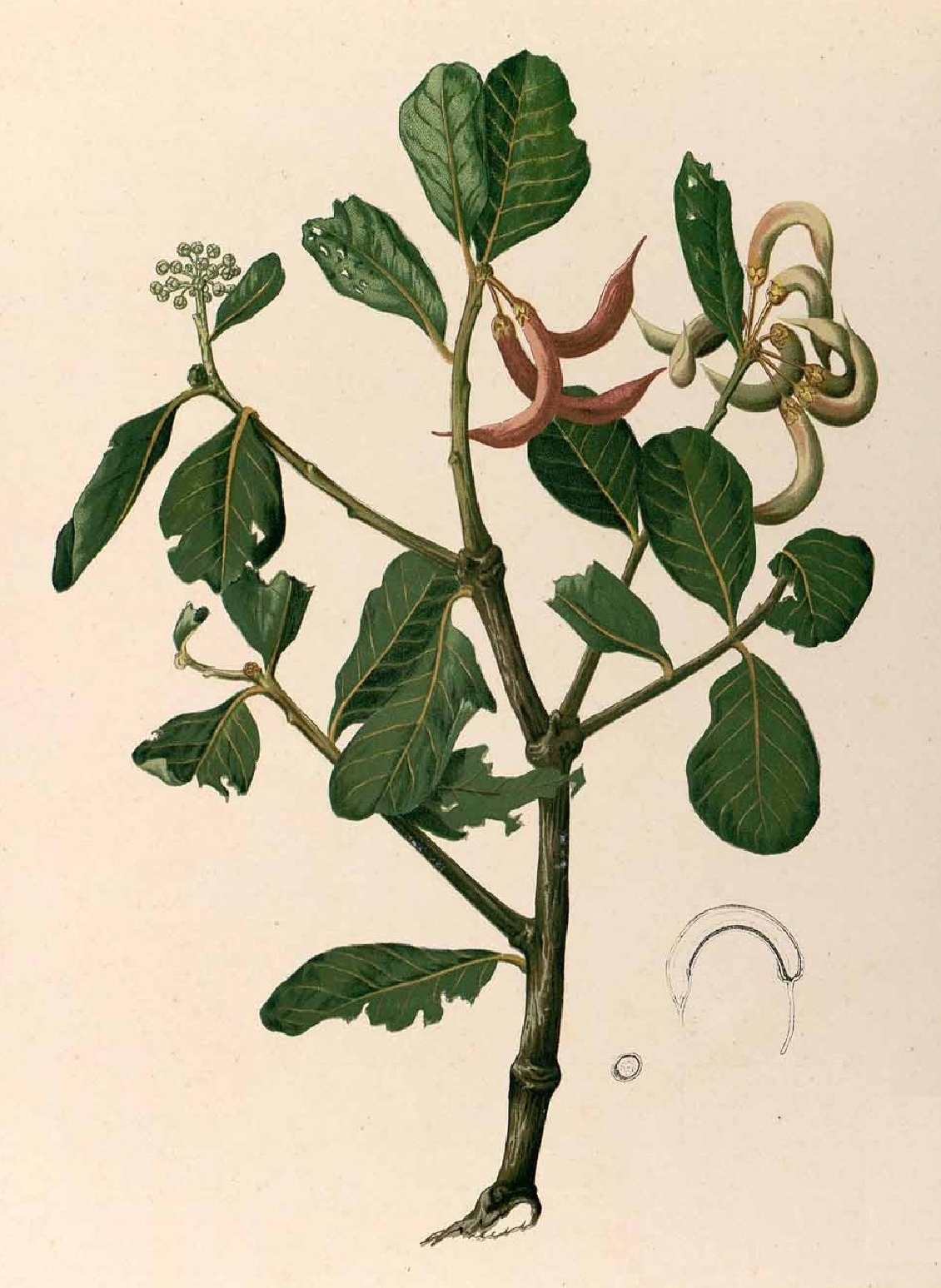
Plate depicting the "tundok" tree (Aegiceras corniculatum), from Fray Francisco Manuel Blanco's "Flora de Filipinas"

=== Alternative names and orthographies ===
As a result of Tondo's history as a center of commerce, it has been referred to by many names by in various texts and languages. It is variously also referred to as Tundo, Tundun, Tundok, Tung-lio, Tundaan, Tunduh, Tunda, or Tong-Lao.

=== Origins of the name "Tondo" ===
Numerous theories on the origin of the name "Tondo" have been put forward. Filipino National Artist Nick Joaquin suggested that it might be a reference to high ground ("tundok"). The French linguist Jean-Paul Potet, however, has suggested that the river mangrove, Aegiceras corniculatum, which at the time was called "tundok" ("tinduk-tindukan" today), is the most likely origin of the name. Kapampangan studies professor Robby Tantingco suggested that the name was derived from tundun, Kapampangan term of "nape."

=== Tondo as a "Bayan" ===
According to the earliest Tagalog dictionaries, large coastal settlements like Tondo and Maynila, which a lakan or rajah ultimately led, were called "bayan" in the Tagalog language. This term (which is translated today as "country" or "town") is a Tagalog term that eventually came to refer to the entire Philippines in modern times, alongside the word bansa (meaning "nation").

However, the precolonial settlement of Tondo has also been described using several descriptors.

The earliest firsthand Spanish accounts described it as a smaller "village", in comparison to the fortified polity of Maynila. However, this term is no longer used in academic circles because it reflects the strong hispanocentric bias of the Spanish colonizers.

Travelers from monarchical cultures who had contacts with Tondo (including the Chinese, Portuguese and the Spanish) also often initially mislabelled it as the "Kingdom of Tondo". Early Augustinian chronicler Pedro de San Buenaventura explained this to be an error as early as 1613 in his Vocabulario de la lengua tagala. Historian Vicente L. Rafael notes, however, that the label was later adapted by the popular literature of the Spanish colonial era anyway because Spanish-language writers of the time did not have the appropriate words for describing the complex power relations on which Maritime Southeast-Asian leadership structures were built.

Historian F. Landa Jocano has described Tondo using the term "large barangay", making Tondo out to be a larger version of what Filipino historians have traditionally considered the "basic political structure" of pre-colonial societies. However, the use of the term "barangay" for such purposes has recently been brought to question by historian Damon Woods, who believes that the use of this term was the result of a 20th-century American mistranslation of the writings of Juan de Plasencia.

To avoid cross-cultural inaccuracies regarding the political structure of Tondo, it is usually described in academic texts using generic umbrella terms, where it is described as the "Tondo polity" or "Tondo settlement".

== Geographical location and political influence ==
Detail of the Duque de Almodóvar's 1787 "Plan de Manila su Bahia y Puerto de Cavite" with the islands of Binondo, Tondo, and Isla de Balut highlighted in sepia.

Scholars generally agree that Tondo was located north of the Pasig river, on the northern part of Lusong or Lusung, which is an Old Tagalog name for the Pasig river delta. This name is thought to have been derived from the Tagalog word for a large wooden mortar used in dehusking rice. This name eventually came to be used as the name for the entire island of modern Luzon.

=== Territorial boundaries ===
Except in the case of fortified polities such as Maynila and Cainta, the first-hand descriptions of territorial boundaries of Tagalog polities tend to discourage scholars from providing exact delineations, because the descriptions depict the boundaries of even compact polities like Tondo as slowly diminishing concentrations of households, dissipating into agricultural land (parang) and eventually wild vegetation (sukal).

However, Tondo's territorial boundaries are generally accepted as defined by several bodies of water which gave Tondo an island shape:

- the Pasig River to the South;
- the Canal de la Reina, forming the Isla de Binondo between itself and Estero de Binondo to the southeast,
- an eastern stretch of the Estero de Vitas to the east,
- the Estero de Sunog Apog to the northeast forming the Isla de Balut between itself and the Estero de Vitas,
- a northern stretch of the Estero de Vitas merging from the mouth of the Navotas River to the north, and
- the original (pre-reclamation) shoreline of Manila Bay to the west.

Notably, the area of modern Tondo now known as "Gagalangin" is not believed to have been part of Tondo's original "territory", since it was a place grown wild with plants in olden days.

The shoreline of the modern district of Tondo has been significantly altered by reclamation activities. Pre-reclamation maps of Tondo show a relatively straight shoreline from the beachfront of Intramuros to the mouth of the Estero de Vitas.

Tondo's territorial boundaries also excluded territory occupied by Maynila Namayan (modern day Santa Ana and Mandaluyong), Tambobong (modern day Malabon), Butas (modern day Navotas), Pandacan, and Pasay – all of which had their own respective leaders.

=== Notable areas ===
One notable area controlled by Tondo under the reign of Bunao Lakandula in the 1500s was called "Baybay", now known as the district of San Nicolas, Manila. William Henry Scott, citing Augustinian missionary records, notes that Bunao Lakandula had allowed a group of Chinese refugees, fleeing persecution from Japan, to settle there. These refugees, which included two Christians, then "diked, drained, and reclaimed land along the waterfront", extending the shore of Tondo further out to Manila Bay.

Another notable area controlled by Tondo was on the banks of the Estero de Vitas, called "Sunog Apog", which eventually lent its name to the nearby Estero de Sunog Apog in Gagalangin. This area was noted for the production of lime (apog) through the burning (pag-sunog) of oyster (talaba) shells, and a lime kiln was still present in the area by 1929.

=== Polities influenced through the lakan's "alliance network" ===
Although popular portrayals and early nationalist historical texts sometimes depict Philippine paramount rulers, such as those in the Maynila and Tondo polities, as having broad sovereign powers and holding vast territories, critical historiographers such as Jocano, Scott, and Junker explain that historical sources clearly show that paramount leaders, such as the lakans of Tondo and the rajahs of Maynila, exercised only a limited degree of influence, which did not include claims over the barangays (Note: Specifically meaning their "following", or group of loyal supporters) and territories of less-senior datus.

Junker describes this structure as an "alliance group", which she describes as having "a relatively decentralized and highly segmentary structure" similar to other polities in Maritime Southeast Asia:

In the Philippines, the primary unit of collective political action appears to have been an organizationally more fluid "alliance group," [...] made up of perpetually shifting leader-focused factions, represented the extension of [...] power over individuals and groups through various alliance-building strategies, but not over geographically distinct districts or territories.

The Malacañang Presidential Museum, on the other hand, described this political setup in their 2015 Araw ng Maynila briefers as an "alliance network."

This explains the confusion experienced by Martin de Goiti during the first Spanish forays into Bulacan and Pampanga in late 1571. Until that point, Spanish chroniclers continued to use the terms "king" and "kingdom" to describe the polities of Tondo and Maynila, but Goiti was surprised when Rajah Sulayman of Maynila explained there was "no single king over these lands" and how his own subjects frequently disobeyed his orders despite his nominal title as rajah, and that the leadership of Tondo and Maynila over the Kapampangan polities did not include either territorial claim or absolute command. San Buenaventura (1613, as cited by Junker, 1990 and Scott, 1994) later noted that Tagalogs only applied the term Hari (King) to foreign monarchs, rather than their own leaders.

==== Polities in Bulacan and Pampanga ====
The influence of Tondo and Maynila over the datus of various polities in pre-colonial Bulacan and Pampanga are acknowledged by historical records, and are supported by oral literature and traditions. This influence was assumed by Miguel Lopez de Legaspi, leading him to implore Bunao, the Lakan of Tondo, to join Martin de Goiti on his journey to Bulacan and Pampanga in late 1571. However, since the Lakandula did not have territorial sovereignty over these territories, the effort met with limited success.

Patanne, as well as Abinales and Amoroso, interpret Postma's translation of the Laguna Copperplate Inscription as meaning that this influence-via-alliance-network defined Tondo's relationship with the territories of Binwangan, Pailah, and Puliran, which Postma believed to be in Bulacan/Pampanga.

Polities in Bulacan and Pampanga which were supposedly under the influence of Tondo and Maynila's alliance network include, but are not limited to:

- Paila, in Barangay San Lorenzo, Norzagaray, Bulacan (coordinates 14–54.5 & 121–06.9) – the "Pailah" mentioned in the LCI.
- Pulilan, Bulacan (coordinates: 14–54.2 & 120–50.8) – the "Puliran" mentioned in the LCI.
- Barangay Binwangan in Obando (coordinates: 14–43.2 & 120–543) – the "Binwangan" mentioned in the LCI. It was also mentioned in the Carta Hydrographica y Chorographica de las Islas Filipinas (1734) as Vinuanga.
- Candaba, Pampanga

==== Laguna Lake region polities ====
Scholars, particularly Junker (1990) and Scott (1994) also acknowledge that Tondo and Maynila engaged in trade and political alliances with Puliran, a region covering the southeastern shore of Laguna Lake. However, neither Junker nor Scott, or even other scholars such as Jocano, Odal-Devora, or Dery, do not explicitly characterize this relationship as Puliran being a part of Tondo and Maynila's alliance network.

The interpretation of Puliran as part of Tondo and Maynila's alliance network is instead implied by the challenge posed by the Pila Historical Society Foundation and local historian Jaime F. Tiongson to Postma's assertions regarding the exact locations of places mentioned in the Laguna copperplate.

According to Tiongson's interpretation: Pailah refers to Pila; Puliran refers to Puliran, the old name of the territory that occupied the southeastern part of Laguna de Bay at the time; and Binwangan refers to modern-day Barangay Binawangan in Capalonga, Camarines Norte.

Polities in the Puliran region which were supposedly under the influence of Tondo and Maynila's alliance network include, but are not limited to:

- The southeastern shore region of Laguna Lake – interpreted as the "Puliran Kasumuran" mentioned in the LCI
- Pila, Laguna – interpreted as the "Pailah" mentioned in the LCI

== Culture and society ==
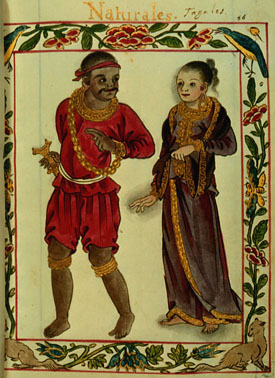
A portrayal of the Ginu class. From the Boxer Codex, c. 1595.

Since at least the 3rd century, the Kapampangan and Tagalog people of Tondo had developed a culture which is predominantly Hindu and Buddhist society. They are ruled by a lakan, which belongs to a caste of Maharlika, were the feudal warrior class in ancient Tagalog society in Luzon, translated in Spanish as hidalgos, and meaning freeman, libres or freedman. They belonged to the lower nobility class similar to the timawa of the Visayans. In modern Filipino, however, the term itself has erroneously come to mean "royal nobility", which was actually restricted to the hereditary maginoo class.

=== Social structure ===
The pre-colonial Tagalog barangays of Manila, Pampanga and Laguna had a more complex social structure than the cultures of the Visayas, enjoying a more extensive commerce through their Bornean political contacts, and engaging in farming wet rice for a living. The Tagalogs were thus described by the Spanish Augustinian friar Martin de Rada as more traders than warriors.

In his seminal 1994 work Barangay: Sixteenth Century Philippine Culture and Society (further simplified in the briefer by the Presidential Communications Development and Strategic Planning Office in 2015), historian William Henry Scott delineates the three classes of Tagalog society during the 1500s:

- the maginoo (ruling class), which included the lakan/rajah and the datus under him;
- A class described as "freemen" consisting of timawa and maharlika; and
- Alipin (slaves), which could further be subcategorized as aliping namamahay or aliping sa gigilid.

The term datu or lakan, or apo refers to the chief, but the noble class to which the datu belonged to was known as the maginoo class. Any male member of the maginoo class can become a datu by personal achievement.

The term timawa referring to freemen came into use in the social structure of the Tagalogs within just twenty years after the coming of the Spaniards. The term, however, was being incorrectly applied to former alipin (commoner and slave class) who have escaped bondage by payment, favor, or flight. Unlike the Visayan timawa, the Tagalog timawa were primarily freemen with less emphasis on military roles, reflecting the differing societal structures of the regions. The equivalent warrior class in the Tagalog society was present only in Laguna, and they were known as the maharlika class.

At the bottom of the social hierarchy are the members of the alipin class. There are two main subclasses of the alipin class. The aliping namamahay who owned their own houses and served their masters by paying tribute or working on their fields were the commoners and serfs, while the aliping sa gigilid who lived in their masters' houses were the servants and slaves.

The more complex social structure of the Tagalogs was less stable during the arrival of the Spaniards because it was still in a process of differentiating.

=== Leadership structure ===
Tondo was a large coastal settlement led by several leaders, called datu, who had their own followings, called either "dulohan" or "barangay". These datus with their respective barangays in turn acknowledged the leadership of a datu with the most senior rank – a "paramount ruler" or "paramount datu", who was called a "lakan". According to San Buenaventura, a large coastal settlement with this kind of leadership structure was called a "bayan".

The equivalent paramount datus who led the southern polity of Maynila were referred to using the term "rajah", and in Mindanao, a similar title in more Islamized polities was that of "sultan".

The term for the barangay social groupings refers to the large ships called balangay, which were common on such coastal polities, and is used by present-day scholars to describe the leadership structure of settlements in early Philippine history. This leads to some confusion for modern readers, because the term "barangay" was also later adapted (through the 1991 Local Government Code) as a replacement for the Spanish term barrio to describe the smallest administrative division in the modern Republic of the Philippines – a government structure very different from the original meaning of the word.

In addition, Jocano warns that there were significant differences between "smaller" barangays, which were only 30 to 100 households in size, and considerably larger barangays, which according to Buenaventura were called "bayan". Jocano asserted that the social and governance structures of these larger barangays, with high levels of economic specialization and a clear system of social stratification, should be the primary model for the analysis of social structures in early Philippine history, rather than the "smaller" barangays.

Popular literature has described these political entities as either chiefdoms or kingdoms. Although modern scholars such as Renfew note that these are not appropriate technical descriptions.

Contemporary historiographers specializing in early Philippine history prefer to use the generic term "polity" in international journals, avoiding the terms "chiefdom" and "kingdom" altogether.

Scholars such as William Henry Scott and F. Landa Jocano have continued to use the term "barangay", especially in longer-form texts such as books and anthologies, because these longer forms allow space for explanations of the differences between the modern and archaic uses of the word "barangay".

=== Cultural influences ===
Map depicting the Greater Indian cultural sphere, showing the Philippines as among the countries, highlighted in yellow, which are outside the Indian cultural zone but have considerable current or historical Indian cultural influence.

Scholarly analysis of the Laguna Copperplate Inscription, which includes the first historical mention of Tondo, suggests that Tondo was "culturally influenced" by the Hindu and Buddhist cultures of Maritime Southeast Asia as early as the 9th century. The writing system used on the copperplate is the Old Kawi, while the language used is a variety of Old Malay, with numerous loanwords from Sanskrit and a few non-Malay vocabulary elements whose origin may be Old Javanese. The date indicated on the LCI text says that it was etched in the year 822 of the Saka Era, the month of Waisaka, and the fourth day of the waning moon, which corresponds to Monday, April 21, 900 AD in the Proleptic Gregorian calendar.

While these Hindu-Buddhist cultural influences can ultimately be traced to the cultures of the Indian subcontinent, scholars generally do not believe that it indicates physical contact between the Philippines and India. The scope, sequence, and mechanism of Indian cultural influences in early Philippine polities continues to be an active area of research and are the subject of much debate among scholars of Philippine and Southeast Asian history and historiography.

During the reign of Sultan Bolkiah from 1485 to 1524, the Sultanate of Brunei decided to break Tondo's monopoly in the China trade by attacking Tondo and establishing the state of Maynila as a Bruneian satellite-state.

== Religion ==
Historical accounts, supported by archeological and linguistic evidence and by corroborated by anthropological studies, show that the Tagalog people, including those in Tondo and Maynila, practiced a set of Austronesian beliefs and practices which date back to the arrival of Austronesian peoples, although various elements were later syncretistically adapted from Hinduism, Mahayana Buddhism, and Islam.

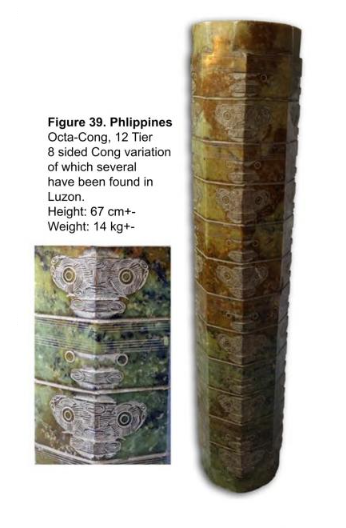
A Black Green Jade Kong found in Luzon Philippines in the vicinity of what is now Tondo, presumed to be forged locally. Kongs in Chinese and neighboring Asian cultures are holy symbols of royal power as it postulates mastery and finesse, since it is shaped as an elongated Inverted pyramid, thus requiring extreme order and balance to sustain stability and inertia.

The Tagalogs did not have a specific name for this set of religious beliefs and practices, although later scholars and popular writers referred to it as Anitism, or, less accurately, using the general term "animism."

=== Tagalog religious cosmology ===
The Tagalog belief system revolved around the idea that the world was inhabited by spirits and supernatural entities, a worldview reflected in their religious practices and rituals.

According to the early Spanish missionary-ethnographers, the Tagalog people believed in a creator-god named Bathala, whom they referred to both as maylicha (creator; lit. "actor of creation") and maycapal (lord, or almighty; lit. "actor of power"). Loarca and Chirino also report that in some places, they were called "Molayri" (Molaiari) or "Diwata" (Dioata)." However, these early missionary-ethnographers also noted that the Tagalogs did not include Bathala in their daily acts of worship (pag-a-anito). Buenaventura was informed that this was because the Tagalogs believed Bathala was too mighty and distant to be bothered with the concerns of mortal man, and so the Tagalogs focused their acts of appeasement to "lesser" deities and powers, immediate spirits which they believed had control over their day-to-day life.

Because the Tagalogs did not have a collective word to describe all these spirits together, Spanish missionaries eventually decided to call them "anito," since they were the subject of the Tagalog's act of pag-aanito (worship). According to Scott, accounts and early dictionaries describe them as intermediaries ("Bathala's agents"), and the dictionaries used the word abogado (advocate) when defining their realms. These sources also show, however, that in practice, they were addressed directly: "in actual prayers, they were petitioned directly, not as intermediaries." Modern day writers divide these spirits are broadly into the categories of "Ancestor spirits, nature spirits, and guardian spirits," although they also note that the dividing line between these categories is often blurred.

Demetrio, Cordero-Fernando, and Nakpil Zialcita observe that the Luzon Tagalogs and Kapampangans' use of the word "Anito", instead of the word "Diwata" which was more predominant in the Visayan regions, indicated that these peoples of Luzon were less influenced by the Hindu and Buddhist beliefs of the Majapahit empire than the Visayans were. They also observed that the words were used alternately amongst the peoples in the southernmost portions of Luzon – the Bicol Region, Marinduque, Mindoro, etc. They suggested that this would have represented a transitional area, the front lines of an increased "Indianized" Majapahit influence which was making its way north the same way Islam was making its way north from Mindanao.

=== Localization of other beliefs ===
Although most contemporary historians, approaching Philippines from the point of view of critical historiography, assert the predominance of indigenous religious beliefs, they also note that there are significant manifestations of other belief systems in early Tagalog history. While it was common among mid-20th century historians and in earlier texts to use these manifestations as evidence of "influence," more contemporary scholars of Southeast Asian history have emphasized that the manifestations of these beliefs do not necessarily reflect outright adoption of these religions, but rather of syncretistic adaptation or "localization."

Osborne (2004) describes a process of "adaptation" happening in connection with Hindu and Buddhist influences in the various cultures of Maritime Southeast Asia, and emphasizes that this "indianization" of Southeast Asia did not per-se overwrite existing indigenous patterns, cultures, and beliefs:

Because Indian culture "came" to Southeast Asia, one must not think that Southeast Asians lacked a culture of their own. Indeed, the generally accepted view is that Indian culture made such an impact on Southeast Asia because it fitted easily with the existing cultural patterns and religious beliefs of populations that had already moved a considerable distance along the path of civilization.[…] Southeast Asians, to summarize the point, borrowed but they also adapted. In some very important cases, they did not need to borrow at all.

Milner (2011) suggests that this pattern of adaptation reflects what Wolters (1999) calls "localization," a process by which foreign ideas ("specifically Indian materials") could be "fractured and restated and therefore drained of their original significance" in the process of being adopted into "various local complexes."

==== Hindu and Buddhist religious influences ====
Hinduism expansion in Asia, from its heartland in Indian Subcontinent, to the rest of Asia, especially Southeast Asia, started circa 1st century marked with the establishment of early Hindu settlements and polities in Southeast Asia.

The degree to which Hindu and Buddhist cultures influenced the Philippine archipelago is debated among scholars, with evidence suggesting trade and cultural exchange through the Srivijaya and Majapahit empires. The current scholarly consensus is that although the Philippines was not directly influenced by India, Hindu and Buddhist cultural and religious influences reached the Philippines through trade – possibly on a small scale with the SriVijayan empire, and more definitively and extensively with the Majapahit empire.

The Laguna Copperplate Inscription, which is the artifact which specifically points to an Indian cultural (linguistic) influence in Tondo, does not explicitly discuss religious practices. However, some contemporary Buddhist practitioners believe that its mention of the Hindu calendar month of Vaisakha (which corresponds to April/May in the Gregorian Calendar) implies a familiarity with the Hindu sacred days celebrated during that month.

Elsewhere in the Philippines, Hindu and Buddhist religious influences are evidenced by the presence of explicitly religious artifacts – in at least one case as close to Tondo as Calatagan, Batangas.

Contemporary Buddhist practitioners believe that Filipino cultures would have been exposed to the Vajrayana and Theravada schools of Buddhism through their trade contacts with the SriVijaya and Majapahit, and archeological findings on the Island of Luzon have produced artifacts associated with the Mahayana school of Buddhism.

==== Islamization ====
One clearer exception to the predominance of "Anitism" in early Tondo and Maynila was that the apex-level leaders of these polities identified themselves as Muslims, as did the migrant sailor Luzones who were encountered by early 15th century chroniclers in Portuguese Malacca. However, the various ethnographic reports of the period indicate that this seemed to only be a nominal identification ("Muslim by name") because there was only a surface level acknowledgement of Muslim norms (avoidance of pork, non-consumption of blood, etc.) without an "understanding of Mohammedan teachings." Scholars generally believe that this nominal practice of Islam actually represented the early stages of Islamization, which would have seen a much more extensive practice of Muslim beliefs had the Spanish not arrived and introduced their brand of Iberian Catholicism.

Islamization was a slow process characterised by with the steady conversion of the citizenry of Tondo and Manila which created Muslim domains. Islamization of Luzon began in the 16th century when traders from Brunei settled in the Manila area and married locals while maintaining kinship and trade links with Brunei and thus other Muslim centres in Southeast Asia. The Muslims were called "Moros" by the Spanish who assumed they occupied the whole coast. There is no evidence that Islam had become a major political or religious force in the region, with Father Diego de Herrera recording that the Moros lived only in some villages and were Muslim in name only.

== Economic activities ==
Historians widely agree that the larger coastal polities which flourished throughout the Philippine archipelago in the period immediately prior to the arrival of the Spanish colonizers (including Tondo and Maynila) were "organizationally complex", demonstrating both economic specialization and a level of social stratification which would have led to a local demand for "prestige goods".

Specialized industries in the Tagalog and Kapampangan regions, including Tondo and Maynila, included agriculture, textile weaving, basketry, metallurgy, hunting, among others. The social stratification which gave birth to the Maginoo class created a demand for prestige products including ceramics, textiles, and precious stones. This demand, in turn, served as the impetus for both internal and external trade.

Junker notes that significant work still needs to be done in analyzing the internal/local supply and demand dynamics in pre-Spanish era polities, because much of the prior research has tended to focus on their external trading activities. Scott notes that early Spanish lexicons are particularly useful for this analysis, because these early dictionaries captured many words which demonstrate the varied nuances of these local economic activities.

=== Trade ===
Junker describes coastal polities of Tondo and Maynila's size as "administrative and commercial centers functioning as important nodes in networks of external and internal trade." While the basic model for the movement of trade goods in early Philippine history saw coastal settlements at the mouth of large rivers (in this case, the Pasig River delta) controlling the flow of goods to and from settlements further upriver (in this case, the upland polities on the Laguna Lake coast), Tondo and Maynila had trade arrangements which allowed them to control trade throughout the rest of the archipelago. Scott observes that while the port of Tondo had the monopoly on arriving Chinese merchant ships, it was Manila's fleet of trading vessels which in turn retailed them to settlements throughout the rest of the archipelago, so much so that Maynila's ships came to be known as "Chinese" (sinina).

==== Redistribution of Chinese goods ====
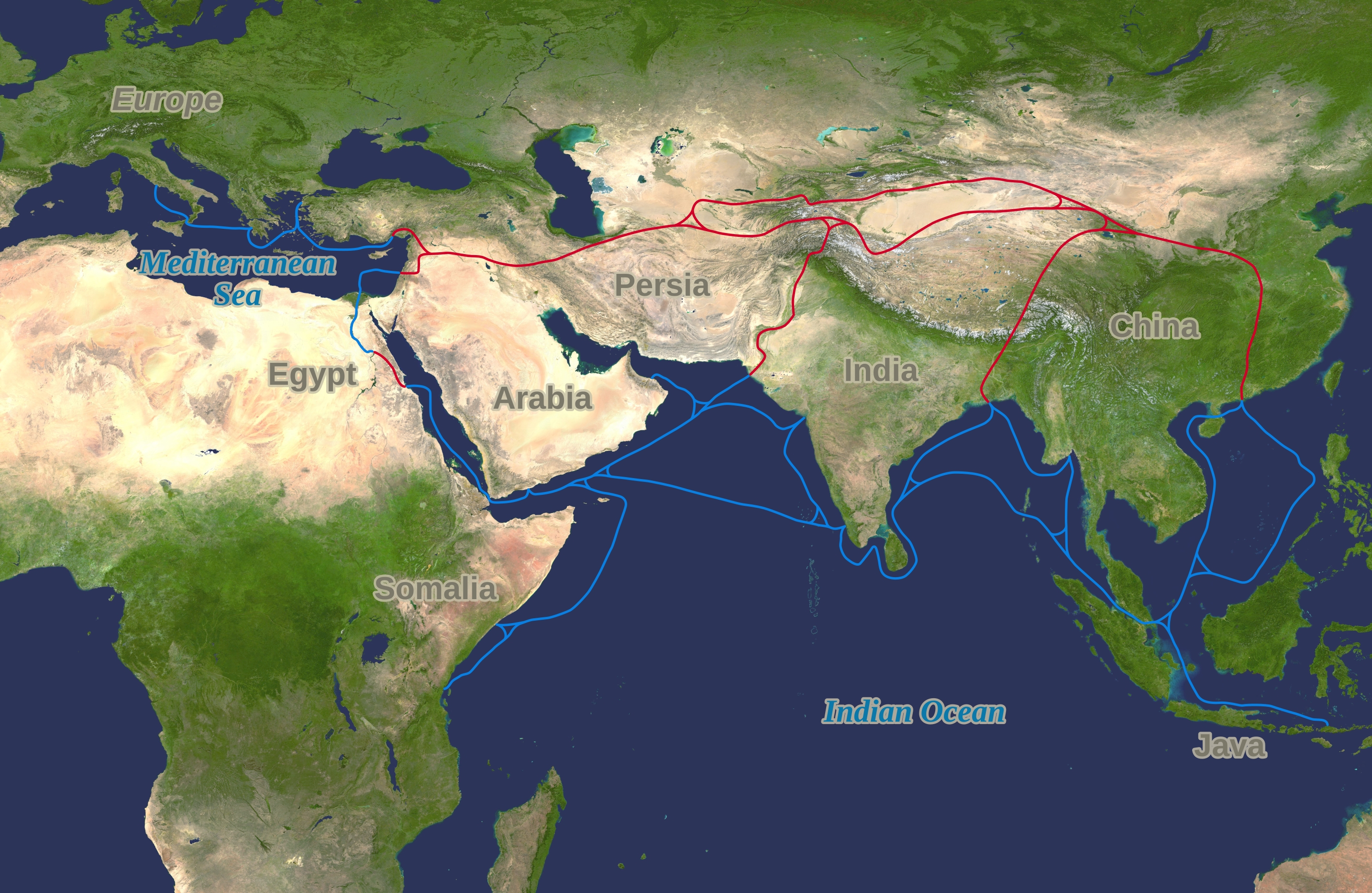
Tondo and Maynila's shared trade relations with China make the Manila bay area one of the northernmost points on the route of the Silk Road.

The most lucrative of Tondo's economic activities involved the redistribution of Chinese goods, which would arrive in Manila bay through Tondo's port and be distributed throughout the rest of the archipelago, mostly through Maynila's extensive shipping activities.

The Chinese migrations to Malaya and the Philippines shore began in the 7th century and reached their peak after 1644 owing to the Manchu conquest of China. These Chinese immigrants settled in Manila, Pasig included, and in the other ports, which were annually visited by their trade junks, they have cargoes of silk, tea, ceramics, and their precious jade stones.

According to William Henry Scott (1982), when ships from China came to Manila bay, Lakandula would remove the sails and rudders of their ships until they paid him duties and anchorage fees, and then he would then buy up all their goods himself, paying half its value immediately and then paying the other half upon their return the following year. In the interim, these goods would be traded throughout the rest of the archipelago. The end result was that other locals were not able to buy anything from the Chinese directly, but from Tondo and Maynila, who made a tidy profit as a result.

Augustinian Fray Martin de Rada Legaspi says that the Tagalogs were "more traders than warriors", and Scott notes in a later book (1994) that Maynila's ships got their goods from Tondo and then dominated trade through the rest of the archipelago. People in other parts of the archipelago often referred to Maynila's boats as "Chinese" (Sina or Sinina) because they came bearing Chinese goods.

==== Gold as a currency ====
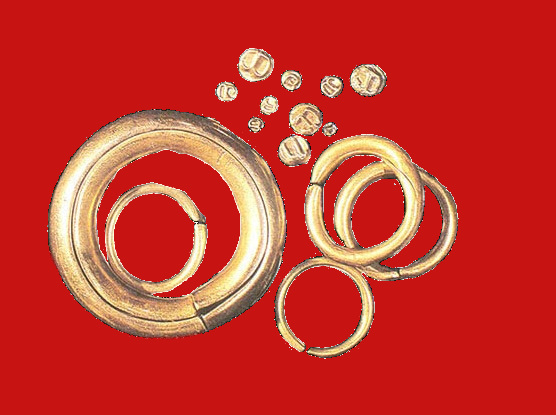
The Piloncitos, a type of gold nuggets with Baybayin Ma characters. Used as one of the early currency along with Gold rings.

Trade among the early Filipinos and with traders from the neighboring islands was conducted through Barter. The inconvenience of barter later led to the use of some objects as a medium of exchange. Gold, which was plentiful in many parts of the islands, invariably found its way into these objects that included the Piloncitos, small bead-like gold nuggets/bits considered by the local numismatists as the earliest coin of ancient Filipinos, and gold barter rings.

The Piloncitos, a type of small gold ingots, with some the size of a corn kernel, typically weigh from 0.09 to 2.65 grams. Large Piloncitos weighing 2.65 grams approximate the weight of one mass. Piloncitos have been excavated from Mandaluyong, Bataan, the banks of the Pasig River, and Batangas. That gold was mined and worked here is evidenced by many Spanish accounts, like one in 1586 that said:

The people of this island (Luzon) are very skillful in their handling of gold. They weigh it with the greatest skill and delicacy that have ever been seen. The first thing they teach their children is the knowledge of gold and the weights with which they weigh it, for there is no other money among them.

Other than piloncitos, the people of Tondo also used the Barter rings, which are gold ring-like ingots. These barter rings are bigger than doughnuts in size and are made of nearly pure gold. Barter rings were circulated in the Philippines up to the 16th century.

=== Aquaculture and agriculture ===
Tondo was primarily known as an aquacultural community, similar to its neighbors such as Palanyag, Tambobong and others. The waters that surrounded old Tondo were clean which gave the area an abundance of marine life, leading to the development of innovations such as by drying (tuyo) or smoking (tinapa) fish. Fishermen who caught fish, mussels, oysters, clams, paros and sea urchins often rode on light boats. However, the people of Tondo also engaged in harvesting bamboo.

== Foreign relations ==
=== Within the Philippine archipelago ===
==== Maynila ====
By virtue of proximity, Tondo had a close and complex relationship with its neighbor-settlement, Maynila. Tondo and Maynila were key trade hubs for Chinese goods, significantly influencing the distribution of these goods throughout the archipelago, with Tondo's port controlling the arrival of Chinese goods and Maynila retailing those goods to settlements throughout the rest of the archipelago. Historical accounts specifically say that Maynila was also known as the "Kingdom of Luzon", but some scholars such as Potet and Alfonso suggest that this exonym may have referred to the larger area of Manila Bay, from Bataan and Pampanga to Cavite, which includes Tondo. Whatever the case, the two polities' shared alliance network saw both the Rajahs of Maynila and the Lakans of Tondo exercising political influence (although not territorial control) over the various settlements in what are now Bulacan and Pampanga.

Notably, the 1521 account of "Prince" Ache, who would later become Rajah Matanda, cites a bitter territorial dispute between Maynila, then ruled by Ache's mother, and Tondo, then ruled separately by Ache's cousin. This conflict was enough to cause Ache to run away to his uncle, the Sultan of Brunei, in a bid to martial some military support as leverage against Tondo.

==== Butas, Tambobong, and Macabebe ====
Tondo's relations with its neighboring settlements to the north are less clear, but the anonymous 1571 account translated by Blair and Robertson notes that the "neighboring village" of "Butas" (now called Navotas) acted independently of Tondo in 1571, and allied itself with the leader of Macabebe during the Battle of Bangkusay. Other sources mention another polity, Tambobong was further north of Navotas. This is generally believed to be the origin of the present day city of Malabon.

=== Outside the Philippine archipelago ===
==== Java ====
One of the primary sources of Tondo's historiography—the Laguna Copperplate Inscription (c. 900 AD), was written using Kawi script, a writing system developed in Java. The inscription was written in Old Malay, with a few Sanskrit and Old Javanese elements, and many of the words in the inscription having equivalents in Tagalog. This was a rare trace of Javanese influence that reached far flung island as far north as Luzon, which suggests the extent of interinsular exchanges of that time.

The Dutch anthropologist Antoon Postma has concluded that the Laguna Copperplate Inscription contains toponyms that might be corresponding to certain places in modern Philippines; such as Tundun (Tondo); Pailah (Paila, now an enclave of Barangay San Lorenzo, Norzagaray); Binwangan (Binuangan, now part of Obando); and Puliran (Pulilan). The toponym of Mdaŋ in particular, is interesting since it might correspond to the Javanese Kingdom of Mataram, in present-day Indonesia, which flourished around the same period (c. 9th to 10th century). However, the nature of Tondo's relations with Java is not clear.

==== Cambodia and India ====
The Portuguese who conquered the nearby Sultanate of Malacca, noticed that the people of Luzon traded with the people of Cambay (Cambodia) and Keling (India) albeit since their knowledge of the Luzones people were imprecise they mistook the Luzones from Luzon island, to have come from Borneo, before they corrected that notion in later records.

Letter from Rui de Brito Patalim, Captain of Malacca, to King Manuel I of Portugal, January 6, 1514, in Malacca. Published in Artur Basílio de Sá, ed., Documentação para a História das Missões do Padroado Português do Oriente. Insulíndia, Vol. 1 (Lisbon: Agência Geral do Ultramar, 1954), 66−74 (Page 68).

"Three junks came from Borneo to this city [Malacca]. They brought edible camphor, seed pearls and provisions. The king is a kaffir and the merchants are Moors. Borneo is a large island that lies between China and the Moluccas, in the Archipelago. The people of the island are called Luções. They are good men and our friends. They take cloth from Cambay and from the Keling on the return journey.".

They had traffic and trade with people from Indianized Cambodia and India, this is why linguistic researchers found traces of the Sanskrit and Tamil languages in Kapampangan, and the Tondo kingdom used to incorporate what was now the Tagalog and Kampampangan speaking areas.

== Timeline of historical events ==
=== Conflicts with Maynila (before 1521) ===
According to the account of Rajah Matanda as recalled by Magellan expedition members Gines de Mafra, Rodrigo de Aganduru Moriz, and expedition scribe Antonio Pigafetta, Maynila had a territorial conflict with Tondo in the years before 1521.

At the time, Rajah Matanda's mother (whose name was not mentioned in the accounts) served as the paramount ruler of the Maynila polity, taking over from Rajah Matanda's father (also unnamed in the accounts, assumed to be Salalila), who had died when Rajah Matanda was still very young. Rajah Matanda, then simply known as the "Young Prince" Ache, was raised alongside his cousin, who was ruler of Tondo – presumed by some to be a young Bunao Lakandula, while historian Ian Christopher Alfonso in his 2016 study identifies the unnamed cousin as Malanci or Malangsi, who was mentioned in the "Will of Fernando Malang Balagtas" as the son of Prince Balagtas and Panginoan, who was the uncle and aunt of Ache respectively, thereby corroborating the theory. However, the identity of the elder cousin itself was not specifically named in the Spanish accounts.

During this time, Ache realized that his cousin, who was ruler of the Tondo polity, was "slyly" taking advantage of Ache's mother by taking over territory belonging to Maynila. When Ache asked his mother for permission to address the matter, his mother refused, encouraging the young prince to keep his peace instead. Prince Ache could not accept this and thus left Maynila with some of his father's trusted men, to go to his "grandfather", the Sultan of Brunei, to ask for assistance. The Sultan responded by giving Ache a position as commander of his naval force.

In 1521, Prince Ache was coming fresh from a military victory at the helm of the Bruneian navy and was supposedly on his way back to Maynila with the intent of confronting his cousin when he came upon and attacked the remnants of the Magellan expedition, then under the command of Sebastian Elcano. Some historians suggest that Ache's decision to attack must have been influenced by a desire to expand his fleet even further as he made his way back to Lusong and Maynila, where he could use the size of his fleet as leverage against his cousin, the ruler of Tondo.

=== Exclusion from the Battle of Manila (May 1570) ===
While Spanish colonizers first arrived in the Philippines in 1521, the Spanish only reached the Manila Bay area and its settlements in 1570, when Miguel López de Legazpi sent Martín de Goiti to investigate reports of a prosperous Moro settlement on the island of Luzon.

De Goiti arrived in mid-1570 and was initially well received by Maynila's ruler Rajah Matanda, who, as former commander of the Naval forces of Brunei, had already had dealings with the Magellan expedition in late 1521. Negotiations broke down, however, when another ruler, Rajah Sulayman, arrived and began treating the Spanish belligerently, saying that the Tagalog people would not surrender their freedoms as easily as the "painted" Visayans did. The accounts of the De Goiti mission report that Tondo's ruler, Lakandula, sought to participate in these negotiations early on, but De Goiti intentionally ignored Lakandula because he wanted to focus on Maynila, which Legazpi wanted to use as a headquarters because it was already fortified, whereas Tondo was not.

By May 24, 1570, negotiations had broken down, and according to the Spanish accounts, their ships fired their cannon as a signal for the expedition boats to return. Whether or not this claim was true, the rulers of Maynila perceived this to be an attack and as a result, Sulayman ordered an attack on the Spanish forces still within the city. The battle was very brief because it concluded with the settlement of Maynila being set ablaze.

The Spanish accounts claim that De Goiti ordered his men to set the fire, historians today still debate whether this was true. Some historians believe it is more likely that the Maynila forces themselves set fire to their settlement, because scorched-earth retreats were a common military tactic among the peoples of the Philippine archipelago at the time.

De Goiti proclaimed victory, symbolically claimed Maynila on behalf of Spain, then quickly returned to Legaspi because he knew that his naval forces were outnumbered. Contemporary writers believe the survivors of Maynila's forces would have fled across the river to Tondo and other neighboring towns.

=== Establishment of Maynila (May 1571) ===
López de Legazpi himself returned to assert the Spanish claim on Maynila a year later in 1571. This time, it was Lakandula who first approached the Spanish forces, and then Rajah Matanda. Historical accounts suggest that Rajah Sulayman initially did not participate in negotiations with the Spanish, possibly due to concerns about antagonism.

López de Legazpi began negotiating with Rajah Matanda and Lakandula to use Maynila as his base of operations, and an agreement was reached by May 19, 1571. According to Spanish accounts, Sulayman began participating in the discussions again when he apologized to the Spanish for his aggressive actions of the previous year, saying that they were the product of his "youthful passion." As a result of these talks, it was agreed that Lakandula would join De Goiti in an expedition to make overtures of friendship to the various polities in Bulacan and Pampanga, with whom Tondo and Maynila had forged close alliances. This was met with mixed responses, which culminated in the Battle of Bangkusay Channel.

=== Battle of Bangkusay Channel (June 1571) ===
June 3, 1571, marked the last resistance by locals to the occupation and colonization by the Spanish Empire of Manila in the Battle of Bangkusay Channel. Tarik Sulayman, the chief of Macabebes, refused to ally with the Spanish and decided to mount an attack at the Bangkusay Channel on Spanish forces, led by Miguel López de Legazpi. Sulayman's forces were defeated, and he was killed. The Spanish victory in Bangkusay and Legaspi's alliance with Lakandula of Tondo, enabled the Spaniards to establish themselves throughout the city and its neighboring towns. The defeat at Bangkusay significantly weakened resistance against the Spanish among the Pasig River settlements, paving the way for the establishment of Spanish authority.

=== Tondo Conspiracy (1587–1588) ===
The Tondo Conspiracy of 1587–1588, also referred to as the "Revolt of the Lakans" and sometimes the "Conspiracy of the Maharlikas" was a plot against Spanish colonial rule by the Tagalog and Kapampangan nobles of Manila and some towns of Bulacan and Pampanga. They were the indigenous rulers of their area or an area yet upon submission to the might of the Spanish was relegated as mere collector of tributes or at best Encomenderos that needed to report to a Spanish governor. It was led by Agustín de Legazpi, the son of a Maginoo of Tondo (one of the chieftains of Tondo), born of a Spanish mother given a Hispanized name to appease the colonizers, grandson of conquistador Miguel López de Legazpi, nephew of Lakandula, and his first cousin, Martin Pangan. The datus swore to rise up in arms. The uprising failed when they were betrayed to the Spanish authorities by Antonio Surabao of Calamianes. The mastermind of the plot was Don Agustín de Legazpi; the mestizo grandson of conquistador Miguel López de Legazpi, nephew of Lakandula, a relative of Rajah Matanda. Being a Moro, he was the son-in-law of Sultan Bolkiah of Brunei, whose first cousin was Martín Panga, the gobernadorcillo of Tondo.

Besides the two, the other leaders were Magat Salamat, son of Lakandula and a ruler of Tondo; Juan Banal, another ruler of Tondo and Salamat's brother-in-law; Geronimo Basi and Gabriel Tuambacar, brothers of Agustín de Legazpi; Pedro Balingit, the Lord of Pandakan; Felipe Salonga, the Lord of Polo; Dionisio Capolo (Kapulong), the Lord of Kandaba and brother of Felipe Salonga; Juan Basi, the Lord of Tagig; Esteban Taes (also Tasi), the Lord of Bulakan; Felipe Salalila, the Lord of Misil (Maysilo); Agustín Manuguit, son of Felipe Salalila; Luis Amanicaloa, another ruler of Tondo; Felipe Amarlangagui, the commander-and-chief of Katanghalan; Omaghicon, the Minister of Nabotas, and Pitongatan (Pitong Gatang), another ruler of Tondo and two governors from Malolos and Guiguinto.

== Notable rulers and nobles of Tondo ==
=== Historical rulers of Tondo ===
A number of rulers of Tondo are specifically identified in historical documents, which include:

- the epistolary firsthand accounts of the members of the Magellan and Legaspi expeditions, referred to in Spanish as "relaciones";
- various notarized genealogical records kept by the early Spanish colonial government, mostly in the form of last wills and testaments of descendants of said rulers; and,
- in the case of Jayadewa, specific mention in the Laguna Copperplate Inscription.

Title	Name	Specifics	Dates	Primary source(s)	Academic reception of primary source(s)
Senepati	Jayadewa	Senapati (Admiral), known in the LCI as the ruler who gave the pardon to Namwaran and his relatives Dayang Angkatan and Buka for their excessive debts in c. 900 AD.	c. 900 CE	Identified in the Laguna Copperplate Inscription as the ruler of Tondo in c. 900 CE	Identification as ruler of Tondo in c. 900 CE proposed by Antoon Postma and generally accepted by Philippine historiographers
Lakan or Lakandula	Unnamed, presumably Malangsi	The unnamed ruler of Tondo who was Ache's older cousin who attacked Maynila under the regency of Ache's unnamed mother, who was the daughter of Sultan Bolkiah, according to an 1882 Spanish document, identified as Malanci or Malangsi, firstborn son of Prince Balagtas and Panginoan	fl. 1521	"Coleccion de Documentos Inéditos para la Historia de España" by the Marquis of Fuensanta del Valle (1882) Will of Fernando Malang Balagtas (cited by Dery, 2001)	Identification by Ian Christopher Alfonso (2016) as Malanci or Malangsi, the firstborn son of Prince Balagtas
Lakan or Lakandula	Pansomun, later baptized as Don Fernando Malang Balagtas	Claimed to be a native of Tabungao, son of Malanci and Mandic, with the title of "Lakandula", presumably of Tondo, later died in Binalatongan, Pangasinan.	fl. 1521–1589	Will of Fernando Malang Balagtas (cited by Dery, 2001)	Authenticity of Balagtas and his will questioned by Isabelo de los Reyes and William Henry Scott, but supported by Luis Camara Dery and Ian Christopher Alfonso
Lakan or Lakandula	Bunao (Lakandula)	Bunao Lakandula, Lakan of Tondo, he is the last ruler which possess the title of "Lakan".	Birth: – Death:c. 1575 "Three years after" Legazpi and Rajah Matanda, who both died in 1572." Reign: c. 1570s and earlier	Multiple firsthand accounts from the Legaspi Expedition (early 1570s); Spanish genealogical documents	Firsthand accounts generally accepted by Philippine historiographers, with corrections for hispanocentric bias subject to scholarly peer review; veracity of genealogical documents subject to scholarly peer review.
Don (Presumably Lakan, but the actual use of the term is not recorded in historical documents.)	Agustin de Legazpi	The last Tagalog ruler of Tondo; son of Rajah Sulayman, proclaimed Lakandula of Tondo after the death of Bunao Lakandula. Co-instigator of the 1588 Tondo Conspiracy along with his cousin Magat Salamat (Lakandula's son); caught and executed by the Spanish, resulting in the dissolution of Tondo.	1575–1589	Firsthand accounts of the Legaspi Expedition (mid-1570s); Spanish genealogical documents	Firsthand accounts generally accepted by Philippine historiographers, with corrections for hispanocentric bias subject to scholarly peer review; veracity of genealogical documents subject to scholarly peer review.

=== Legendary rulers ===
A number of rulers of Tondo are known only through oral histories, which in turn have been recorded by various documentary sources, ranging from historical documents describing oral histories, to contemporary descriptions of modern (post-colonial/national-era) oral accounts. These include:

- orally transmitted genealogical traditions, such as the Batu Tarsila, which have since been recorded and cited by scholarly accounts;
- legends and folk traditions documented by anthropologists, local government units, the National Historical Institute of the Philippines, and other official sources; and
- recently published genealogical accounts based on contemporary research.

Scholarly acceptance of the details recounted in these accounts vary from case to case, and are subject to scholarly peer review.

Title	Name	Specifics	From	Primary sources	Academic notes on primary sources
"Princess" or "Lady" (term used in oral tradition, as documented by Odal-Devora)	Panginoan	In Batangueño Folk Tradition as cited by Odal-Devora, the daughter of Kalangitan and Lontok who were rulers of Pasig, who eventually married Balagtas, King of Balayan and Taal. In Kapampangan Folk Tradition as cited by Odal-Devora, who eventually married Bagtas, the "grandson of Kalangitan." In oral tradition recounted by Nick Joaquin and Leonardo Vivencio, "Princess Panginoan of Pasig" who was married by Balagtas, the son of Emperor Soledan of Majapahit in 1300 in an effort consolidate rule of Namayan. According to the Will of Fernando Malang Balagtas cited by Luis Camara Dery (2001), a daughter of Lontok and Kalangitan who married Prince Balagtas, son of the Emperor Soledan and Empress Sasanban of Sapa.	15th century	Batangueño folk tradition, Kapampangan folk tradition, Oral tradition cited by Vivencio and Joaquin Will of Fernando Malang Balagtas (cited by Dery, 2001)	First mentioned in the Will of Fernando Malang Balagtas, then cited in non-academic work by Nick Joaquin, then later mentioned in Odal-Devora, 2000.
Gat	Lontok	In Batangueño Folk Tradition as cited by Odal-Devora, husband of Kalangitan, serving as "rulers of Pasig" together. According to the Will of Fernando Malang Balagtas cited by Luis Camara Dery (2001), a son of Lakantagkan/Arao and Buwan/Maylac, who married Kalangitan of Pasig.	15th century	Kapampangan folk tradition Will of Fernando Malang Balagtas (cited by Dery, 2001)	First mentioned in the Will of Fernando Malang Balagtas, then cited in non-academic work by Nick Joaquin, then later mentioned in Odal-Devora, 2000.
Dayang or Sultana	Kalangitan	Legendary "Lady of the Pasig" in Batangueño Folk Tradition and "Ruler of Sapa" in Kapampangan Folk Tradition (as documented by Odal-Devora). Either the mother in law (Batangueño Tradition) or grandmother (Kapampangan Tradition) of the ruler known as "Prinsipe Balagtas" According to the Will of Fernando Malang Balagtas cited by Luis Camara Dery (2001), a lady of the Pasig who married Lontok, son of Arao and Maylac.	15th century	Kapampangan folk tradition Will of Fernando Malang Balagtas (cited by Dery, 2001)	First mentioned in the Will of Fernando Malang Balagtas, then cited in non-academic work by Nick Joaquin, then later mentioned in Odal-Devora, 2000.
Sultan	Bolkiah	Sultan Bolkiah, according to Brunei folk history, is the "Nakhoda Ragam" or the "Singing Captain", the reputed conqueror of the Philippines. The tradition even names the cannon with which he was said to have taken Manila – "Si Gantar Alam", translated as the "Earth-shaking Thunderer". He established an outpost in the center of the area of Manila. According to this legend, Sultan Bolkiah of Brunei is the grandfather of Ache, the old rajah, also known as Ladyang Matanda or Rajah Matanda.	c. 1500–1524	–	–

=== Nobles associated with Tondo ===
Title	Name	Specifics	Dates	Primary sources	Academic notes on primary sources
Hwan (possibly "Honourable" or "Lord")	Namwaran	Probable person-name mentioned in the Laguna Copperplate Inscription, as the ancestor of Namwaran and Bukah and original debtor of the transaction in question. The title "Hwan" is translated "Honourable" or "Lord" in different lines of the LCI, depending on context.	c. 900 AD	Translation of the Laguna Copperplate Inscription by Antoon Postma	
Dayang	Angkatan	Probable person-name mentioned in the Laguna Copperplate Inscription, as the descendant (daughter) of Namwaran. Related through Namwaran to Bukah.	c. 900 AD	Translation of the Laguna Copperplate Inscription by Antoon Postma	
	Bukah	Probable person-name mentioned in the Laguna Copperplate Inscription, as the descendant of Namwaran related to the Lady (Dayang) Angkatan	c. 900 AD	Translation of the Laguna Copperplate Inscription by Antoon Postma	
	Kasumuran (uncertain)	Possible person-name mentioned in the Laguna Copperplate Inscription. The word may either be a reference to a Lord Minister or a reference to an ancient name of the Southeast coast region of Laguna Lake	c. 900 AD	Translation of the Laguna Copperplate Inscription by Antoon Postma	Identified by Postma as possibly being either a place-name or a person-name. Possible reference the Southeast coast region of Laguna Lake proposed by Tiongson
Gat	Bishruta	Probable person-name mentioned in the Laguna Copperplate Inscription, as the representative of the Lord Minister of "Binwagan"	c. 900 AD	Translation of the Laguna Copperplate Inscription by Antoon Postma	Postma's conclusions about the Bulacan location of Binwagan have been questioned by local Laguna historian Tiongson (2006)
	Ganashakti(uncertain)	Probable person-name mentioned in the Laguna Copperplate Inscription, as the representative of Jayadewa, Lord Minister of "Pailah"	c. 900 AD	Translation of the Laguna Copperplate Inscription by Antoon Postma	Postma's conclusions about the Bulacan location of Pailah have been questioned by local Laguna historian Tiongson (2006)
Datu	Magat Salamat	Co-instigator of the 1588 "Conspiracy of the Maharlikas," son of Bunao Lakan Dula who served as datu under his cousin and co-instigator, Rajah Sulayman's son Agustin de Legaspi who had been pronounced Paramount Ruler over the datus of Tondo after the death of Lakandula.	c. 1588	Firsthand accounts of the Legaspi Expedition (mid-1570s); Spanish genealogical documents	Firsthand accounts generally accepted by Philippine historiographers, with corrections for hispanocentric bias subject to scholarly peer review; veracity of genealogical documents subject to scholarly peer review.
	Luis Amanicaloa	Participant in the 1588 "Conspiracy of the Maharlikas." Member of the Maginoo class from Tondo.	c. 1588		
	Felipe Amarlangagui	Participant in the 1588 "Conspiracy of the Maharlikas." Member of the Maginoo class from Katanghalan.	c. 1588		
	Lord Balingit	Participant in the 1588 "Conspiracy of the Maharlikas." The Datu of Pandakan	c. 1588		
	Pitongatan (Pitong-gatang)	Participant in the 1588 "Conspiracy of the Maharlikas." Member of the Maginoo class from Tondo.	c. 1588		
	Kapulong	Participant in the 1588 "Conspiracy of the Maharlikas." Member of the Maginoo class from Candaba, Pampanga.	c. 1588		
	Juan Basi	Participant in the 1588 "Conspiracy of the Maharlikas." The Datu of Tagig (Taguig)	c. 1588		
	Esteban Taes (also known as Ginoong Tasi)	Participant in the 1588 "Conspiracy of the Maharlikas." A Datu from Bulacan.	c. 1588		

== Notable sources ==
=== Primary sources ===
==== Laguna Copperplate Inscription (c. 900 CE) ====
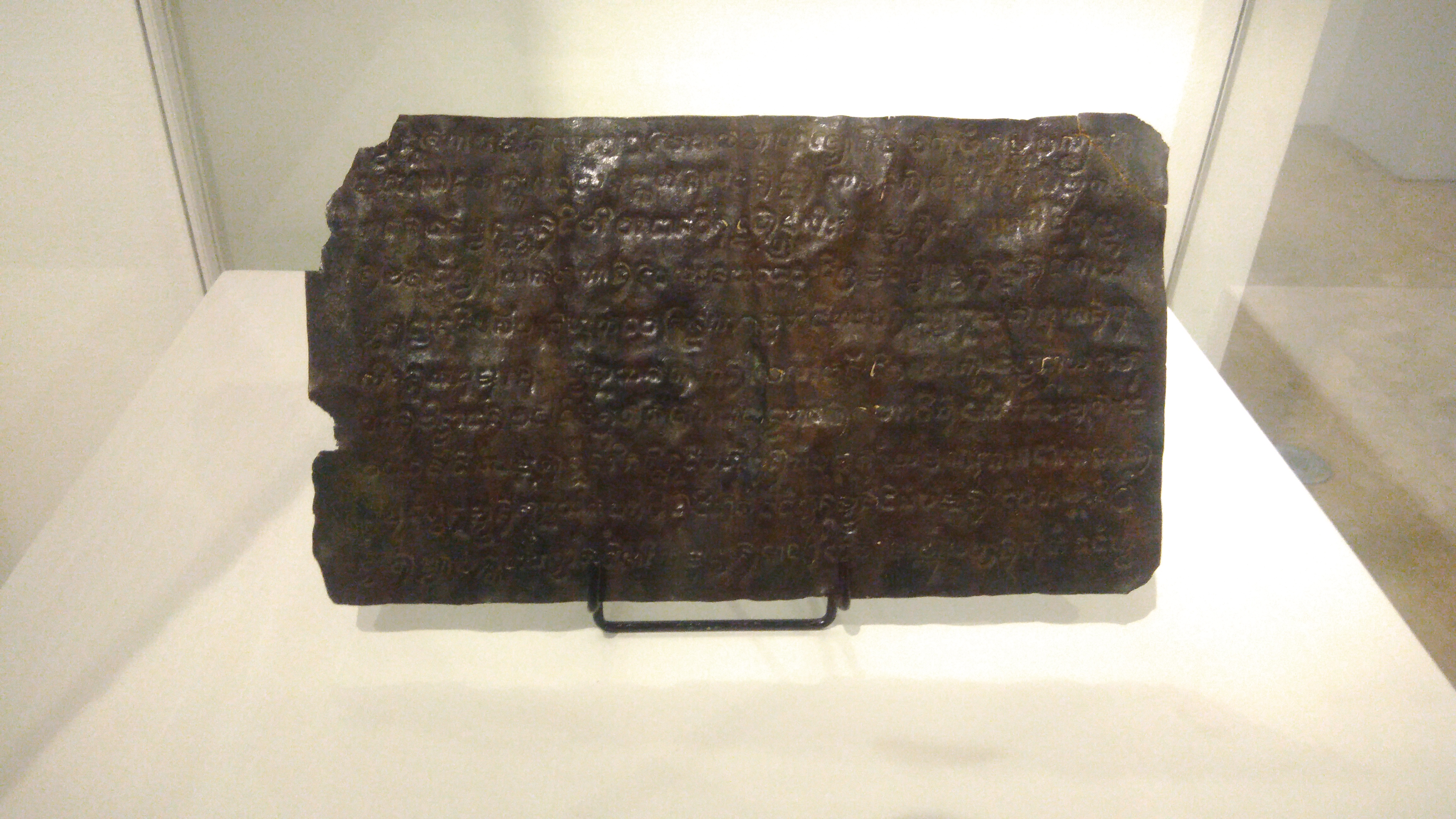
Laguna Copperplate Inscription (c. 900). The artifact is the first historical record mentioning Tondo.

The first reference to Tondo occurs in the Philippines' oldest historical record — the Laguna Copperplate Inscription (LCI). This legal document was written in Kawi, and dates back to Saka 822 (c. 900).

The first part of the document says that:

On this occasion, Lady Angkatan, and her brother whose name is Bukah, the children of the Honourable Namwaran, were awarded a document of complete pardon from the Senepati of Tundun, with the title of His Honor the Lord of Pailah, Jayadewa.

The document was a sort of receipt that acknowledged that the man named Namwaran had been cleared of his debt to the Chief and Commander of Tundun, which in today's measure would be about 926.4 grams of gold.

The article mentioned that other places in the Philippines and their rulers, including Pailah (Lord Minister Jayadewa), Puliran Kasumuran (Lord Minister), Binwangan (unnamed). It has been suggested that Pailah, Puliran Kasumuran, and Binwangan are the towns of Paila, Pulilan, and Binwangan in Bulacan, but it has also been suggested that Pailah refers to the town of Pila, Laguna. More recent linguistic research of the Old Malay grammar of the document suggests the term Puliran Kasumuran refers to the large lake now known as Laguna de Ba'i (Puliran), citing the root of Kasumuran, *sumur as Old Malay for well, spring or freshwater source. Hence ka-sumur-an defines a water-source (in this case the freshwater lake of Puliran itself). While the document does not describe the exact relationship of the Chief and Commander of Tundun with these other rulers, it suggests that he was of higher rank.

==== Firsthand Spanish accounts (1521 – late 1500s) ====
Events that took place in the Pasig river delta in the 1500s were documented in some of the firsthand epistolary accounts ("relaciones") written by the Spaniards who where under the command of Martín de Goiti, and later Miguel de Legazpi himself after arriving in Manila Bay. They were mainly written by the expedition's assigned notary Hernando de Riquel, by Legazpi's successor Guido de Lavezares, and by Legazpi himself. Hwever, there are also some references to Maynila, Luzon, and Tondo in the accounts of the Magellan expedition in 1521, which, under the command of Sebastian Elcano, had captured a commander of naval forces for the Sultan of Brunei, whom the researchers William H. Scott and Luis Dery identified as Prince Ache, who would later become Rajah Matanda. These events, and the details Ache's interrogation, were recorded in accounts of Magellan and Elcano's men, including expedition members Rodrigo de Aganduru Moriz, Gines de Mafra, and the expedition's scribe Antonio Pigafetta. Many of these relaciones were later published in compilations in Spain, and some were eventually translated and compiled into the multi-volume collection "The Philippine Islands, 1493-1898" by Emma Helen Blair and James Alexander Robertson.

==== Early Tagalog lexicons (late 16th century – early 17th century) ====
In addition to the extensive descriptions contained in the firsthand accounts of the Spanish expeditions, much of what is now known about precolonial Tagalog culture, religion, and language are derived from early Tagalog dictionaries and grammar books, such as Fray San Buenaventura's 1613 "Vocabulario de la lengua tagala" and Fray Francisco Blancas de San José's 1610 "Arte de la lengua tagala." Scott notes that while the relaciones spoke much about the Tagalogs' religion because it was the concern of the Spanish missionaries, and of their political and martial organization because it was the concern of the Spanish bureaucrats, these dictionaries and grammar books are rich sources of information regarding the Tagalogs' material and ephemeral culture.

=== Notable genealogical sources ===
Historical documents containing genealogical information regarding the rulers of Tondo during and immediately after the arrival of the Spanish fleet in the early 1570s mostly consist of notarized Spanish documents executed by the direct descendants of rulers such as Bunao Lakandula of Tondo, Rajah Matanda (Ache) and Rajah Sulayman of Maynila. In addition to firsthand accounts of the executors' immediate descendants and relatives, some of the genealogical documents include information from family oral traditions, connecting the document's subjects to local legendary figures. Several of these notarized Spanish documents are kept by the National Archives and are labeled the "Lakandula documents".

Scott, in his seminal 1984 work "Prehispanic Source Materials for the Study of Philippine History", identifies a number of "quasi-historical" genealogical sources, which are not physically historical, but which contain genealogical information which claims to date back to early historic times. These include the Sulu and Maguindanao Tarsilas, and the Batu Tarsila of Brunei.

== Theories associated with old Tondo ==
=== Lakandula as a title ===
While earlier historians think of the Lakandula as a specific person, with Lakan meaning lord or paramount ruler and Dula being a proper name, more recent studies suggest that Lakandula is a hereditary title for the rulers of Tondo.

=== The heirs of Bunao Lakandula ===
In 1587, Magat Salamat, one of the children of Lakandula, and with his Spanish name Augustin de Legazpi, Lakandula's nephew, and the lords of the neighboring areas of Tondo, Pandacan, Candaba, Polo, Navotas, and Bulacan were martyred for secretly conspiring to overthrow the Spanish colonizers. Stories were told that Magat Salamat's descendants settled in Hagonoy, Bulacan and many of his descendants spread from this area.

== See also ==
- Pila (historical polity)
- Luções
- Majapahit
- Cainta (historical polity)
- Namayan
- Lakandula
- Battle of Bangkusay
- Lacandola Documents
- Will of Fernando Malang Balagtas
- Tondo Conspiracy of 1587–1588
- History of the Philippines (900–1521)
- History of Luzon
- Hinduism in the Philippines
