= List of rivers and estuaries in Metro Manila =

Metro Manila, Philippines, is located in the hydraulically complex Pasig River—Marikina River—Laguna de Bay watershed, which includes more than thirty tributaries within the urban area.

The following list is sorted by name, with a brief description of each. Bold indicates the body of water is a major channel.

== Rivers ==
Name	Description	Image
Alabáng River	Drains water from Alabáng (up to Ayala Alabang Village and Festival Supermall). Dumps water into Laguna de Bay via Pasong Diablo River.	
Batasan River	Drains water from Malabón and Navotas. Dumps water into the Tanza River, which empties into Manila Bay via the Tangos River.	
Dampalit River	Drains water from Malabón and Navotas, dumping it into Tangos River.	
Dario River	Quezon City. Tributary of the San Francisco River.	
Dongalo River	Barangay Don Galo.	
**Laguna River**	Major channel. Drains water from Makati, Pateros, and Taguig. Dumps water into Laguna de Bay.	
**Las Piñas River**	Major channel. Drains water from Las Piñas and dumps it directly to Manila Bay.	
Magdaong River	Drains water from Muntinlupa. Dumps water into Laguna de Bay.	
Mangangate River	Drains water from Alabáng and Ayala Alabang in Muntinlupa and empties into Laguna de Bay.	
**Marikina River**	Major channel. Drains water from Marikina, Caintâ, Rodríguez, San Mateo and Antipolo in Rizal, and parts of Quezon City. It leads to the Pasig River.	
**Marilao River**	Major channel. Drains water from Marilao, Meycauayan and as far as the northwestern side of the La Mesa Dam area. Two other rivers, the Meycauayan River and Polo River that drain Malabón and Valenzuela dump their water here. The Santa María River and Balagtás River join the Marilao River in Obando before emptying into Manila Bay.	
**Meycauayan River**	Major channel. Drains water from Valenzuela and Meycauayan in Bulacan. Dumps water into Manila Bay via the Marilao River.	
Muzon River	Drains water from Malabon and Bulacan. Dumps water to Manila Bay via the Marilao River in Bulacan.	
Nangkâ River	Tributary of the Marikina River.	
**Navotas River**	Major channel. Drains water from Navotas, Caloocan and Manila. Intersects with Tullahan River at the middle. Dumps water directly to Manila Bay (southern end) and to Tangos River (northern end).	
**Parañaque River**	Major channel. Drains Parañaque, Pasay, and Manila. Dumps water directly into Manila Bay.	
**Pasig River**	Major channel. Drains water from Laguna de Bay and Marikina River, and also Makati, Mandaluyong, Manila, Quezon City, and San Juan (including the San Juan River). Dumps water directly to Manila Bay.	
Pasong Diablo River	Drains water from Alabáng, Muntinlupa. Dumps water into Laguna de Bay.	
**Pateros River**	Major channel. Drains water from Pateros and Makati (Guadalupe and Bonifacio Global City). Dumps most of its water into Laguna de Bay via the Laguna River at its southeastern end. Dumps some of its water into the Pasig River in Guadalupe.	
Poblacion River	Drains water from Muntinlupa (Poblacion). Dumps water into Laguna de Bay.	
Polo River	Alternatively known as Santolan River. Drains water from Malabon, Valenzuela and Bulacan. Connects both Tullahan and Meycauayan Rivers.	
Salapan River	Quezon City.	
San Francisco River	Quezon City.	
**San Juan River**	Major channel. Drains water from Quezon City (including Tandang Sora and as far as Sauyo and Fairview), San Juan and Manila. Dumps water into Pasig River.	
Sapang Baho River	Its headwaters are in the Sierra Madre in Antipolo crossing the northern portion of Marikina and nearby municipalities in Rizal before emptying into Laguna de Bay.	
**Sucat River**	Major channel. Drains water from Parañaque and Muntinlupa. Dumps water into Laguna de Bay.	
Taguig River		
Tangos River	Drains water from Navotas. Dumps water directly to Manila Bay.	
Tanza River	Drains water from Navotas. Connects with Dampalit River. Dumps water to Tangos River.	
**Tullahan River**	Major channel. Drains water from La Mesa Dam, as well as the northern part of Quezon City, Valenzuela, Malabón and Navotas. Mouth is in Navotas.	
Tunasan River	Drains water from Muntinlupa. Dumps water into Laguna de Bay.	
**Zapote River**	Major channel. Drains water from Las Piñas and parts of Bacoór, Cavite. Dumps water directly into Manila Bay.	

== Creeks, estuaries, channels ==
Name	Description	Image
Amorsolo Creek	Drains water from Amorsolo Street in Makati starting from the area around the Makati Medical Center. A section of has been built over by developers of the Amorsolo on-ramp of the Metro Manila Skyway. Passes through San Lorenzo Village and Don Bosco Church. Dumps water into Estero de Tripa de Gallina.	
Anaran Creek	Quezon City.	
Balaba Creek	Quezon City	
Balingasa Creek	Quezon City. Dumps water into the San Francisco River.	
Bayan Creek	Quezon City.	
Bayanan Creek	Drains water from Muntinlupa. Dumps water into Laguna de Bay.	
Buwaya Creek	Project 4, Quezon City	
Campupot Creek	Quezon City.	
Canal de Balete / Estero de Balete	A waterway in Ermita, Manila, which traversed the four barangays of 660, 660A, 661, and 664 of Zone 71, District V, Ermita, Manila. Has a length of 550 meters, and was adjacent to the Estero de Provisor, and drained into the Pasig River.	
Canal de la Reina (Estero de la Reina)	Drains water from Manila as far as Tayuman Street, Recto Avenue, and Binondo. Ends in Binondo and there is a floodgate or pumping station in that end at Muelle de Binondo. Dumps water into the Pasig River at its southern end. Dumps water into Manila Bay via Estero de Vitas in its northern end.	
Centerville Creek	Quezon City.	
Culiat Creek	Quezon City.	
Dilimán Creek	Quezon City.	
Estero de Avilés		
Estero de Bilibid		
Estero de Binondo		
Estero de Concordia	Pandacan, Manila	
Estero de Curtidor		
Estero de Dulumbayan		
Estero de Gunao		
Estero de Magdalena	Tondo, Manila	
Estero de Maypad	Drains water from Manila, Navotas, and Caloocan. Dumps water to Navotas River.	
Estero de Meysig	Binondo, Manila. Now part of Estero de Magdalena.	
Estero de Paco	Drains Paco and Pandacan in Manila Empties into the left bank of the Pasig River.	
Estero de Pandacan	Drains Pandacan and Paco in Manila. Dumps water into Pasig River.	
Estero de Provisor		
Estero de Quiapo		
Estero de Quinta		
Estero de Quiotan		
Estero de Sampaloc	Minor tributary of the Pasig River. Forms confluence with Estero de Aviles in its end.	
Estero de San Antonio Abad	Malate, Manila. North of Fort San Antonio Abad inside the Bangko Sentral ng Pilipinas Complex.	
Estero de San Jacinto	Now part of Estero de la Reina.	
Estero de San Lazaro	Tondó, Manila	
Estero de San Miguel	Located in the Manila district of San Miguel along its boundary with Quiapo, Sampaloc, and Santa Mesa. Drains into Pasig River.	
Estero de Santa Cruz	Santa Cruz, Manila	
Estero de San Sebastián	Quiapo, Manila	
Estero de Santa Clara	Santa Ana, Manila-Makati.	
Estero de Santibañez	Pandacan, Manila	
Estero de Sibacon		
Estero de Sunog Apog	Drains water from Manila. Dumps water into Manila Bay via Estero de Vitas.	
Estero de Tanduay		
Estero de Tanque	Paco, Manila	
Estero de Tripa de Gallina	Drains water from Manila (Paco and San Andrés), Makati as far as Forbes Park and Fort Bonifacio and travels through Gil Puyat Avenue in Makati and Pasay (including Bangkál and Don Bosco Makati), and then in Parañaque. Dumps water into Manila Bay via the Parañaque River west of the NAIA runway.	
Estero de Trozo	Binondo, Manila, now part of Estero de San Lázaro.	
Estero de Tutubán		
Estero de Uli-Uli		
Estero de Valencia	Drains water from Sampaloc and Santa Mesa, Manila. Dumps water to Pasig River.	
Estero de Vitas	Drains water from Manila (as far as Tayuman Street). Dumps water directly to Manila Bay.	
Gabe Creek	Quezon City.	
Ilang Ilang Creek	Barangay Santa Mónica, Quezon City.	
Kalamiong Creek	Barangay Payatas, Quezon City.	
Kamiás Creek	Quezon City. Tributary of the Dilimán Creek.	
Katipunan Creek	Quezon City.	
Mariblo Creek	Quezon City. Also spelt Mariablo.	
Matalahib Creek	Quezon City.	
Maytunas Creek	Drains Mandaluyong and San Juan. Dumps water into the San Juan River.	
Napindán Channel		
Paltok Creek	Barangay Fairview, Quezon City.	
Pansól Creek	Quezon City.	
Pasong Tamó Creek	Quezon City.	
Pingkian Creek	Quezon City.	
Satopan Creek	Quezon City. Tributary of the San Juan River.	
Tangue Creek	Quezon City.	

== See also ==
- List of rivers of the Philippines
- Manggahan Floodway
