= Music teacher (disambiguation) =

A music teacher is a type of educator who instructs students in music.

Music Teacher may also refer to:

- "The Music Teacher", a 1959 short story by John Cheever
- The Music Teacher, 1988 Belgian film
- Music Teacher, a 2019 Indian film

== See also ==
- Music (disambiguation)
- Teacher (disambiguation)
- List of music students by teacher
