= Estero de Vitas =

River in Manila, Philippines

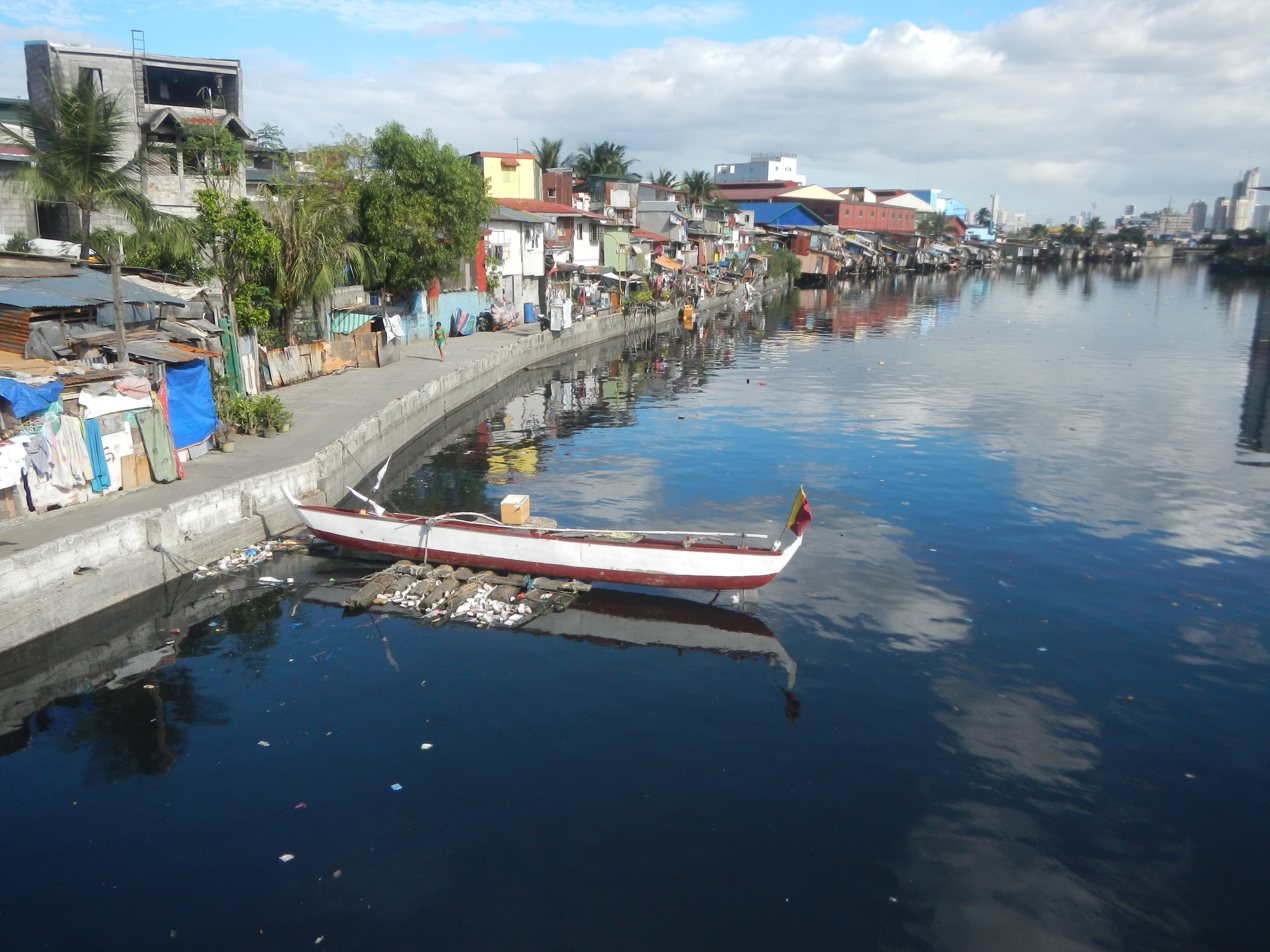
- An outrigger banca on Estero de Vitas, as viewed from R-10 Bridge I, on Radial Road 10, Balut, Tondo, Manila

- Location within Metro Manila Location within Luzon Location within Philippines

Location
- Country: Philippines
- Region: National Capital Region

Physical characteristics
- Mouth: Manila Bay
  - coordinates: 14°37′46″N 120°57′36″E

The Estero de Vitas is one of the rivulets, known as esteros, which delineated the small islands which historically constituted the city of Manila and its predecessors, the Tagalog polities (called bayan) of Maynila and Tondo. These esteros, along with the larger rivers of Manila Bay and the Pasig River delta, originally formed an important connecting network which allowed the precolonial polities of that Tagalog and Kapampangan peoples.

The Estero de Vitas drains water from Manila as far as Tayuman Street, and then dumps water directly to Manila Bay. It is connected to the Navotas River, as well as to Canal de la Reina and Estero de Sunog Apog.

== See also ==
- List of rivers and estuaries in Metro Manila
