= List of Teachers episodes =

List of Teachers episodes may refer to:

- List of Teachers (British TV series) episodes, a comedy-drama series 2001–2004
- List of Teachers (2006 TV series) episodes, an American version of the British series
- List of Teachers (2016 TV series) episodes, an American sitcom on TV Land based on a web series

== See also ==
- Teachers (disambiguation)#Film and television
