= Titser (novel) =

1995 novel by Liwayway A. Arceo

- Author: Liwayway A. Arceo
- Language: Tagalog
- Genre: Novel
- Publication date: 1995
- Publication place: Philippines
- Media type: Print (paperback)
- Pages: 150
- ISBN: 971-550-181-8
- Preceded by: Canal de la Reina

Titser (lit. Teacher) is a Tagalog-language novel written by Filipino novelist Liwayway A. Arceo. It first appeared as a serial on the pages of Liwayway magazine during the 1950s. In 1995, the 150-page novel was published in book form at Quezon City, Manila in the Philippines by the Ateneo de Manila University Press.

== Description ==
The setting of the novel is a community in a Philippine town. The main protagonist of the novel is Amelita Martinez, a teacher. Mauro, another teacher, is Amelita’s husband. The theme of the novel revolves around how Aling Rosa – Amelita’s mother – gets involved with Amelita’s decisions regarding career and love life. It also focuses on how Amelita and Mauro, as husband and wife, respond to the needs of their community, particularly in its upliftment and development.

The other characters in the novel are Osmundo, Mang Ambo, Aling Idad, Rosalida (also known as Lida), Letty, Felisa, Norberto, Jose, Mister Batac, and Enteng. Osmundo was the former suitor of Amelita, a wealthy man preferred by Aling Rosa for Amelita. Mang Ambo is Amelita's father, a more understanding parent than Aling Rosa. Aling Idad is Mauro’s mother. Rosalida is the daughter of Amelita and Mauro. Letty is Rosalida's spoiled cousin and the favorite of Aling Rosa. Felisa, Norberto, and Jose are the affluent siblings of Amelita. Felisa is a physician, Norberto is an engineer, and Jose is an Overseas Filipino worker. Mister Batac is the head teacher or school principal in the school where Amelita and Mauro work as teachers. Mister Batac's wife is a relative of Osmundo. Enteng is an exconvict, a friend of Osmundo. Enteng tried to kill Mauro for Osmundo because he owed Osmundo gratitude for financing his child’s education while in prison.
