= Ang Tundo Man May Langit Din =

1986 novel by Andres Cristobal Cruz

- Author: Andres Cristobal Cruz
- Language: Tagalog
- Genre: Romance
- Publisher: Liwayway; Ateneo de Manila University Press
- Publication date: Serialized: June 22, 1959–May 16, 1960; Book: 1986
- Publication place: Philippines
- Media type: Print
- Pages: 360
- ISBN: 978-9-715-50538-3

Ang Tundo Man May Langit Din ("Even Tundo Has a Heaven") is a 1960 Tagalog-language novel written by Filipino novelist Andres Cristobal Cruz. The novel was first serialized in 48 issues of Liwayway from June 22, 1959 to May 16, 1960, and was then published in book form by the Ateneo de Manila University Press in 1986.

The novel involves love and romance occurring between individuals that residing in a poverty-stricken area in Tondo, Manila in the Philippines. The social background of the individuals produces a "dramatizing effect" in presenting the Philippine experience laid out in contemporary context and setting, giving the novel a similarity in style and theme to Philippine national hero Jose Rizal's Noli Me Tangere.

== See also ==
- Canal de la Reina
