= Titser =

Titser may refer to:

- Titser (novel), a 1995 Tagalog-language novel written by Filipino novelist Liwayway A. Arceo
- Titser (TV series), a Filipino drama television series
