= Liwayway Arceo =

Filipina actor and writer

Liwayway Arceo

Liwayway A. Arceo (January 30, 1924 – December 3, 1999) was a multi-awarded Filipina fictionist, journalist, radio scriptwriter and editor from the Philippines.

== Biography ==
Liwayway A. Arceo was born on January 30, 1924.

Arceo authored a number of well-received novels. She has written almost 50 novels, thousands of short stories, essays, and radio dramas, such as Canal de la Reina (1972) and Titser (1995), which are the most popular. She also published collections of short stories such as Ina, Maybahay, Anak at iba pa, Mga Maria, Mga Eva, Ang Mag-anak na Cruz (1990), and Mga Kuwento ng Pag-ibig (1997). Most of her books were published by Ateneo de Manila University Press and The University of the Philippines Press. Arceo's story, Uhaw ang Tigang na Lupa, was placed second in the Japanese Imperial Government-sanctioned Pinakamabuting Maikling Katha ng 1943 (The Best Short Stories of 1943).

Arceo made her mark as a lead actress in Tatlong Maria, a Japanese/Philippine film produced during World War II. The film was produced by two movie companies, X'Otic Pictures of the Philippines and Eiga Hekusa of Japan, in 1944. She also acted in Ilaw ng Tahanan, a long-running radio serial. Ilaw ng Tahanan became a television soap opera aired on RPN 9, during the late 1970s.

Arceo's short story Lumapit, Lumayo ang Umaga was later turned into an award-winning film by National Artist Ishmael Bernal in 1975. Filipina thespian Elizabeth Oropesa received a FAMAS Best Actress Award in 1976 for her role in the film.

After her death, Filipino writers paid tribute to Liwayway A. Arceo during a memorial service held at the Loyola Memorial Chapel in Guadalupe, Makati, Philippines on December 3, 1999.

== Awards and honours ==
Arceo received a Carlos Palanca Award for Short Story in Filipino (Filipino (Tagalog) Division) in 1962; a Japan Foundation Visiting Fellowship in 1992; a Gawad CCP for Literature given by the Cultural Center of the Philippines in 1993; a Doctorate on Humane Letters, an honoris causa, from the University of the Philippines in 1991; the Catholic Authors Award from the Asian Catholic Publishers in 1990, and the Gawad Balagtas Life Achievement Award for Fiction from the Unyon ng mga Manunulat sa Pilipinas (Writers Union of the Philippines, or UMPIL) in 1988. In 1999, Liwayway Arceo received a Philippine National Centennial Commission award for her pioneering and exemplary contributions in the field of literature.

== Filmography ==
- 1944 - Tatlong Maria ("Three Sisters")
