= Teacher (disambiguation) =

A teacher is a person who helps students to acquire knowledge, competence, or virtue.

Teacher or The Teacher may also refer to:

== Film and television ==
- The Teacher (1974 film), an American film directed by Hickmet Avedis
- The Teacher (1977 film), a Cuban film directed by Octavio Cortázar
- "Teacher" (Fullmetal Alchemist), a 2004 television episode
- A Teacher, a 2013 American film directed by Hannah Fidell
- The Teacher (2016 film), a Slovak-Czech film directed by Jan Hřebejk
- The Teacher (2017 film), a French film directed by Olivier Ayache-Vidal
- The Teacher (2016 TV series), a Polish TV series
- A Teacher (miniseries), a 2020 TV series based on the 2013 film
- The Teacher (2022 TV series), British TV miniseries starring Sheridan Smith
- The Teacher (2022 film), a Malayalam-language Indian film
- The Teacher (2023 film), a British-Qatari-Palestinian film
- "Teacher" (Miranda), a 2009 television episode

== Music ==
- "Teacher" (Jethro Tull song), 1970
- "Teacher" (Nick Jonas song), 2014
- "The Teacher" (Big Country song), 1986
- "The Teacher" (Foo Fighters song), 2023
- "The Teacher", a 1982 song by Magnum from Chase the Dragon
- "The Teacher", a 1999 song by Super Furry Animals from Guerrilla
- "The Teacher", a 2001 song by Paul Simon from You're the One

== People with the surname ==
- Brian Teacher (born 1954), American tennis player
- Kaumudi Teacher (1917–2009), Indian freedom activist

== Other uses ==
- Teacher (Latter Day Saints), an office in the Aaronic priesthood
- Teacher (role variant), in the Keirsey Temperament Sorter personality questionnaire
- Teacher's Highland Cream, a blended Scotch whisky
- A Teacher Partylist, a party-list in Philippine politics
- Qoheleth, or Teacher, subject of the Old Testament book Ecclesiastes
- Sir Leigh Teabing, or the Teacher, a fictional character in The Da Vinci Code
- The Teacher, an antagonist in Little Nightmares II

== See also ==
- Teachers (disambiguation)
- Titser (disambiguation)
- Guru, Sanskrit term for teacher, guide, expert, or master
- Paraprofessional educator, a teaching-related position
- Professor, an academic rank
- Rabbi, a spiritual leader or religious teacher in Judaism
- Tutor, a person who provides assistance on certain subject areas or skills
