= Estero de Sunog Apog =

Stream in Manila, Philippines

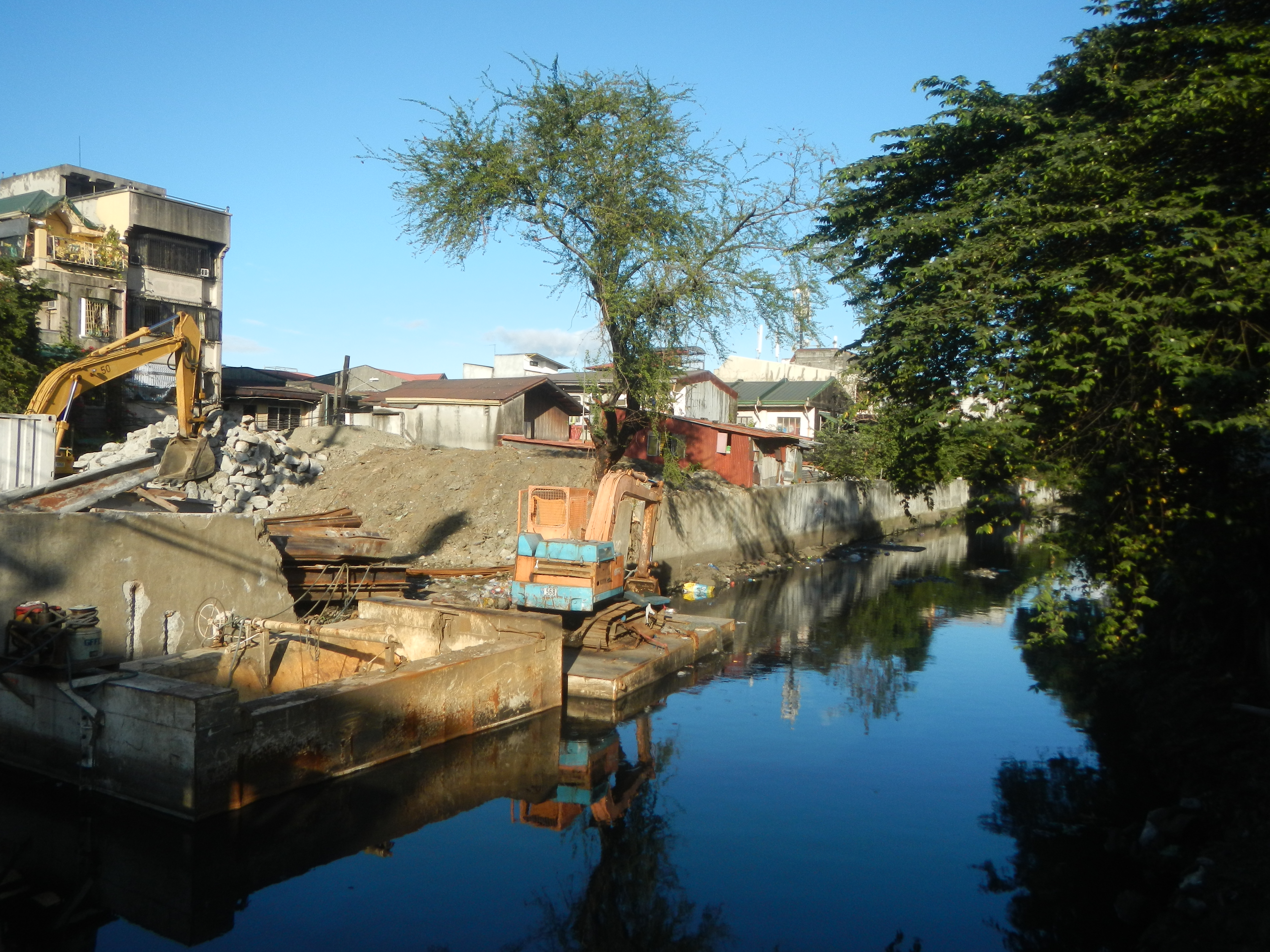

- Location within Metro Manila Location within Luzon Location within Philippines

Location
- Country: Philippines
- Region: National Capital Region

Physical characteristics
- Mouth
  - coordinates: 14°37′33″N 120°57′58″E

The Estero de Sunog Apog is one of the rivulets, known as esteros, which delineated the small islands which historically constituted the City of Manila and its predecessors, the Tagalog polities (called "bayan") of Maynila and Tondo. These esteros, along with the larger rivers of Manila Bay and the Pasig River delta, originally formed an important connecting network which allowed the precolonial polities of that Tagalog and Kapampangan peoples. It currently runs along part of the boundaries of Manila's 1st and 2nd legislative districts.

The Estero de Sunog Apog drains water from Manila as far north as Estero de Maypajo (also sometimes called Estero de Maypad), and then dumps water into Manila Bay via Estero de Vitas. It forms the east bank of the Isla de Balut, along with Estero de Vitas which forms the island's west bank, and Estero de Maypajo and the Navotas River to the island's north.
