= Balingit =

Balingit is a Filipino surname of Kapampangan origin. Notable people with the surname include:

- Bonel Balingit (born 1967), Filipino basketball player
- JoAnn Balingit, American poet and nonfiction writer
