= Vocabulario de la lengua tagala =

Tagalog language Dictionary

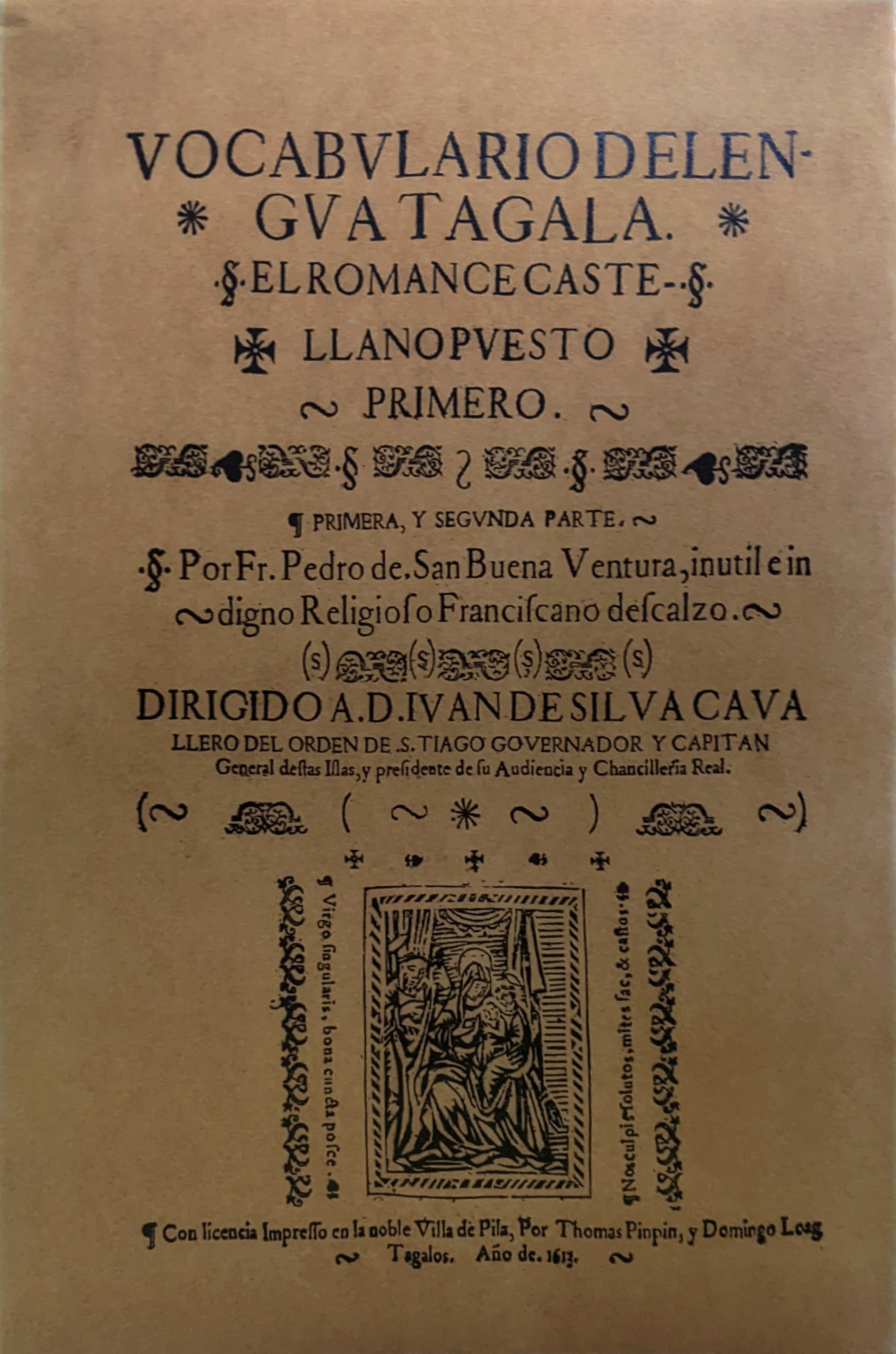
Title page reproduction of the 1613 dictionary

Vocabulario de la lengua tagala (transl. Vocabulary of the Tagalog language) was the first dictionary of the Tagalog language in the Philippines. It was written by the Franciscan friar Pedro de San Buenaventura and published in Pila, Laguna, in 1613. Juan de Plasencia had written a vocabulario earlier but it was not printed. More than a century later, a dictionary of the same name was prepared by Jesuit priests Juan de Noceda and Pedro de Sanlucar; their first edition was published in Manila in 1754 and then the second in 1860, which was reissued by the Komisyon sa Wikang Filipino in 2013.

== Historical and linguistic value ==
The Vocabulario de la lengua tagala by Pedro de San Buenaventura, O.F.M., printed in Pila, Laguna, in 1613, is an important work in Spanish-Filipino literature. Its rarity places it among the limited number of Filipino incunabula — works printed in the Philippines between the years 1593 and 1643—of which copies are still preserved. It is also the first vocabulary or dictionary of a Philippine language printed by Spanish missionaries. These factors alone highlight the significance of this work.

To better understand the value of both the original edition and the current reissue of the Vocabulario de la lengua tagala, it is useful to present the geographical and historical context in which Pedro de San Buenaventura created and printed his work. Spanish polymath Wenceslao E. Retana stated that "Filipino books, in general, are much more scarce than those of any other country in the world (...); the Filipino prints, known by sight, from the 17th and 18th centuries can be counted on the fingers of one hand" (Catálogo abreviado de la biblioteca filipina de W. E. Retana, Madrid 1898, prólogo).

=== Complex linguistic world of the Philippines ===
When El Adelantado Miguel López de Legazpi and his companions, including six Augustinian missionaries, arrived in the Philippines on 13 February 1565, they encountered a complex linguistic landscape. On the island of Luzon alone, six major languages and numerous dialects were spoken. According to approximate statistics from 1591, Tagalog was spoken by 124,000 people, Ilocano by 75,000, Bicol by 77,000, Pangasinan by 24,000, Pampango by 75,000, and Ibanag by 96,000. The largest linguistic group was the Bisaya, spoken in the central region of the archipelago.

This linguistic diversity, which persists today, significantly influenced the missionary strategies of the Augustinians, Franciscans, Jesuits, Dominicans, and Augustinian Recollects. The missionaries recognized the necessity of mastering local languages to effectively convey the Gospel and aspects of Spanish culture.

=== Linguistic studies on Tagalog (1580–1898) ===
The first missionary to focus on the study of Philippine languages was the Augustinian Martín de Rada (1533–1578), who was reported to speak Visayan and Chinese fluently. However, a systematic study of any language did not appear to occur until the Franciscan Extramaduran Juan de Plasencia undertook a significant project. One notable result of this effort was the publication of the Doctrina christiana en letra y lengua española y tagala in Manila in 1593. This work, one of the first three printed in the Philippines, used the xylographic method traditionally employed by the Chinese and is attributed to Plasencia.

The division of missionary territory, mandated by royal decree on 27 April 1594, allowed religious orders to concentrate their linguistic efforts on two, three, or at most four major languages, in addition to Tagalog, which was spoken in the Manila region and served as the basis for the national language. Consequently, all orders studied Tagalog, though with varying interests and outcomes. Linguistic studies and publications in Tagalog far exceed those for other Philippine languages and dialects. Summarized below are the grammars and dictionaries of the Tagalog language printed between 1593 and 1898. Additionally, confessionals, Christian doctrines, and other devotional works written in Tagalog are significant for understanding the language.

The Augustinians printed several significant works in Manila and nearby areas, including Compendio de la lengua tagala by Gaspar de San Agustin (1650–1724) in 1703, Arte de la lengua tagala by Tomás Ortiz (1668–1742) in Sampaloc in 1740, and Gramática de la lengua tagala dispuesta para la más fácil inteligencia de los religiosos principiantes by Manuel Buezeta (1808–?) in Madrid in 1850. A notable and original work published by the Augustinians is Estudio de los antiguos alfabetos filipinos by Cipriano Marcilla y Martín (1851–?), printed in Malabon in 1895.

Agustín María de Castro (1740–1801), using the pseudonym Pedro Andrés de Castro, authored Ortografía y reglas de la lengua tagala. This work was first published in a facsimile edition in Madrid in 1930 by the noted bibliophile Antonio Graiño.

The Jesuit priests Juan José Noceda (1681–1747) and Pedro Sanlúcar (1706–?), along with other members of their order, published Vocabulario de la lengua tagala in Manila in 1754.

Despite arriving in the Philippines after the Augustinians, Franciscans, and Jesuits, the Dominicans were the first to publish Arte y reglas de lengua tagala in Bataan in 1610. This was the first printed Tagalog grammar, authored by Fr. Francisco Blancas de San José (died 1614), who promoted the printing press in the Philippines and is considered one of the foremost experts in Tagalog of his time. This work is regarded as one of the invaluable Filipino incunabula. However, Blancas did not have successors within his Order. It was not until the end of the 19th century that José Hevia y Campomanes (1814–1904) published Lecciones de gramática hispano-tagala in Manila in 1872, which saw twelve reprints in a few years.

One Augustinian Recollect, Toribio Minguella y Arnedo (1836–1920), is noted among Spanish scholars of Tagalog. In addition to Ensayo de gramática hispano-tagala, published in Manila in 1878, he also authored Estudios comparativos entre el tagalo (Filipinas) y el sánscrito, printed in Valladolid in 1888.

In the last decades of the 18th century and throughout the 19th century, the Philippines witnessed a significant population increase and robust economic development. These trends attracted a growing number of Europeans—soldiers, civil servants, missionaries, and businessmen, predominantly Spanish and with higher cultural levels than previous arrivals—to the islands. Many of these newcomers sought to quickly acquire proficiency in the native languages. Consequently, in the latter half of the 19th century, several grammars and vocabularies authored by laymen from these classes began to emerge.

Rosalío Serrano (1802–1867), father of Pedro Serrano Laktaw, published Diccionario de términos comunes tagalo-castellano in Manila in 1854, which underwent several reissues. He also authored Nuevo diccionario manual español-tagalo, published in Manila in 1872. Around the same period, Venancio María de Abella, a Spanish civil servant, released Vademécum filipino o manual de la conversación familiar español-tagalo, seguido de un curioso vocabulario de modismos manileño in Manila in 1869, which saw four reissues between 1869 and 1873. Eligio Fernández published Nuevo vocabulario o Manual de conversaciones en español, tagalo y pampango in Binondo in 1876, which was reprinted eight times.

Eusebio Salvá, an infantry commander, published Vocabulario militar y guía de conversación español-tagalo-visaya in Manila in 1884. In 1887, Método teórico práctico y compendiado para aprender en brevísimo tiempo el lenguaje tagalo appeared in Barcelona, authored by Julius Miles, a pseudonym used by a military doctor. Trinidad Hermenegildo Pardo de Tavera (1857–1925), a versatile Filipino writer, authored several works including Contribución para el estudio de los antiguos alfabetos filipinos published in Losana in 1884, and El sánscrito en la lengua tagala in Paris in 1887. Wenceslao E. Retana (1862–1924), a Spanish historian renowned for his studies on Philippine history, published a pamphlet titled Los antiguos alfabetos de Filipinas in Madrid in 1895. Finally, José Rizal (1861–1896), the national hero of the Philippines, published La nueva ortografía de la lengua tagala in Barcelona in 1890. A notable figure in Tagalog linguistics was Pedro Serrano Laktaw (1853–1924), who authored Diccionario hispano-tagalo. Primera parte, published in Manila in 1889. The second part of his dictionary was not published until 1914.

=== Contributions of the Franciscans to Philippine linguistics ===
In 1580, during the Custodial Chapter of the Franciscans, a decision was made to write a grammar and vocabulary of the Tagalog language, as well as to translate the Doctrina Christiana into Tagalog. This task was entrusted to Father Juan de Plasencia, recognized as the most proficient in the language among them. Three years later, in a letter dated June 18, 1585, addressed to King Felipe II, Plasencia wrote: "In the most general language that exists in these Islands I have written some things, such as the Arte de la lengua tagala y Declaración de toda la doctrina xptiana, and now I am doing the Vocabulario. They are very necessary things for all the ministers if it were printed. It would be a particular favor that Your Majesty would do us, have us order it to be printed in Mexico at the expense of your Real Hacienda, and for this, send me your Cédula, which would be of great use to these souls".

The second work mentioned by Plasencia in the preceding paragraph is the Doctrina christiana en lengua española y tagala. However, neither the Arte nor the Vocabulario were printed. This was due, in part, to Plasencia's death in 1590, three years before the establishment of the printing press in the Philippines. Plasencia, recognized for his proficiency in Tagalog, continued the tradition of linking language and culture, following in the footsteps of earlier Franciscan linguists and ethnologists in New Spain. He also encouraged his fellow Franciscans to pursue similar linguistic and cultural endeavors.

There was a significant figure in Juan de Plasencia's life, Miguel de Talavera, whom he met in childhood, and whose assistance was crucial for his linguistic pursuits. Miguel, originally named Salvador, was born in Nueva Granada, a Spanish settlement in present-day Nicaragua. He arrived in the Philippines with his parents as part of Miguel López de Legazpi's expedition, settling initially in Cebu and later moving to Manila by 1572. In 1578, Salvador's parents entrusted his education to Juan de Plasencia, who furthered his knowledge of Visayan and Tagalog, the principal languages of the Philippines. A strong friendship and mutual support developed between the young Salvador and the missionary. Salvador accompanied the Franciscans as an interpreter and, in turn, taught Tagalog to Plasencia, who instructed him in Latin. In 1580, Salvador joined the Franciscan Order in Manila, taking the name Fray Miguel de Talavera. His life paralleled that of Alonso de Molina, a Mexican Franciscan who taught Nahuatl in New Spain. De Talavera, who died in Pila, Laguna, Philippines, in 1622 at around sixty years of age, acquired an exceptional command of the Tagalog language, attaining profound insight into its nuances. He authored numerous catechetical and spiritual works, though only one, titled An casalanang ipinag cacasala nan onan otos nang Dios (Sins committed against the first commandment of God), was published in Manila in 1617 in a bilingual edition featuring Spanish and Tagalog.

The next notable figure in the lineage of Franciscan Tagalists is Pedro de San Buenaventura, known for his 1613 work Vocabulario. Subsequent Franciscans continued Buenaventura's linguistic efforts, such as Agustín de la Magdalena (died 1689), who published Arte del idioma tagalo in Mexico in 1679. Domingo de los Santos (died 1695), originally from Extremadura, printed Vocabulario de la lengua tagala in Tayabas, Quezon, in 1703, replacing the earlier work by Pedro de San Buenaventura. Melchor de Oyanguren (1688–1747), a native of Gipuzkoa, published Tagalysmo elucidado in Mexico in 1742. Finally, Sebastián de Totanés (1647–1748), hailing from Toledo, synthesized and updated the works of his predecessors in Arte de la lengua Tagala y Manual tagalo para auxilio a los religiosos de esta Santa Provincia de San Gregorio Magno de descalzos de N. S. P. S. Francisco de Filipinas, jointly printed in Sampaloc (Philippines) in 1745. This work saw reissues in 1796, 1850, and 1865.

=== Fray Pedro de San Buenaventura and his Vocabulario ===
Pedro de San Buenaventura, whose birthplace is unknown, arrived in the Philippines around 1594 and dedicated himself to evangelizing the towns of Nagcarlang, Paete, Mauban, Pasabango, Santa Cruz, Siniloan, Manila, Pila, Mambulao, Longos, and Capalonga, around Laguna de Bay until his death in 1627, which occurred during a voyage to the South Seas. In 1613, while stationed in Pila, he completed his significant work, the Vocabulario, which was printed there by Tomás Pinpín and Domingo Loag.
