= Teachers (disambiguation) =

Teachers are people who help students to acquire knowledge, competence or virtue.

Teachers may also refer to:

== Arts, entertainment and media ==
=== Film and television ===
- Teachers (film), a 1984 American satirical comedy-drama
- Teachers TV, a British TV channel and website 2005–2011
- Teachers (British TV series), a comedy-drama series 2001–2004
- Teachers (2006 TV series), an American version of the British series
- Teachers (2016 TV series), an American sitcom on TV Land based on a web series
- "Teachers", an episode of New Girl (season 4)

=== Music ===
- "Teachers", a song by Leonard Cohen from the 1967 album Songs of Leonard Cohen
- "Teachers", a song by Daft Punk from the 1997 album Homework
- "Teachers", a song by P.O.D. from the 2006 album Testify

== Other uses ==
- Teacher's Highland Cream, a blended Scotch whisky
- Teachers Building Society is a mutual British financial institution

== See also ==
- Educators (TV series)
- Ontario Teachers' Pension Plan, or Ontario Teachers'
- Teacher (disambiguation)
