= Canal de la Reina =

1972 novel by Liwayway A. Arceo

- Author: Liwayway A. Arceo
- Cover artist: Fidel Rillo
- Language: Filipino, English
- Genre: Drama
- Publisher: Ateneo de Manila University Press
- Publication date: 1972
- Publication place: Philippines
- Media type: Print
- Pages: 215
- ISBN: 971-550-201-6
- Dewey Decimal: 899.211'3
- LC Class: PL6058.4 1973

Canal de la Reina is a 1972 Filipino novel written by Filipino novelist Liwayway A. Arceo. The novel exposes the social cancer in the high levels of contemporary Philippine society. The social cancer, based on the novel, is masked by the flamboyance and the pomposity of the affluent members of Filipino society.

== Title and setting ==
The novel takes its name from the titular Estero de la Reina (sometimes called the Canal de la Reina) - one of the rivulets, known as esteros, which delineated the small islands which historically constituted the City of Manila. Estero de la Reina is a manmade estro, which was dug through the fishponds of Binondo during Spanish times, in order to facilitate the passage of shipped goods.

== Plot ==
The story opens with the De Los Angeles family arriving at the old home of the matriarch, Caridad. Upon seeing the dilapidated condition of the place, her children, Junior and Leni, are visibly repulsed. Reluctantly, they step out of the car with their father, Salvador, and ask a young boy to watch it for 25 centavos before heading inside.

Vicenta Marcial, also known as Nyora Tentay, is the matriarch of the wealthy Marcial family and is referred to as the "queen of Canal de la Reina." She is a moneylender who charges high interest rates. Nyora Tentay lives with her maid, Dominga Canlas (Ingga), whom she mistreats by starving her and withholding wages. She has a son, Victor, who is married to Gracia Montes, and they have a son named Gerry.

Nyora Tentay buys a piece of land from the De Los Angeles family's former caretaker, Precioso Santos (Osyong), and uses bribery to assert her claim over it.

The De Los Angeles family's lawyer, Atty. Agulto, discovers that Nyora Tentay's land documents for Canal de la Reina are falsified. The documents falsely claim that the family sold the land to Osyong, who then sold it to Nyora Tentay, even though this never occurred.

A flood hits Canal de la Reina, causing significant damage to buildings and structures. After the flood, Nyora Tentay and Ingga part ways. Ingga finds refuge at the De Los Angeles' home, with Junior's help. Caridad discovers Nyora Tentay's falsified land documents, which Ingga had managed to save and bring with her. Although Ingga initially resists, Caridad convinces her to return the documents to Nyora Tentay. Victor then meets Junior, who was asked by Ingga to help return the documents.

Caridad meets with Osyong's wife, Tisya, who reveals the truth: Nyora Tentay threatened to have both her and Osyong imprisoned unless he sold the land to her. Tisya explains that selling the land was the only way they could repay their debts to Nyora Tentay.

Victor visits Nyora Tentay in the hospital and tries to convince her to return the Canal de la Reina land to its rightful owners, the De Los Angeles family. However, during their conversation, Nyora Tentay rejects him, telling him she no longer wants to talk.

Leni achieves her dream of becoming a doctor and marries Gerry. The De Los Angeles family returns to Canal de la Reina, where Junior expresses optimism about the future of the land and its potential.

== See also ==
- Ang Tundo Man May Langit Din
