= Indian influences in early Philippine polities =

The Indian influences in early Philippine polities, particularly the influence of the Srivijaya and Majapahit thalassocracies on cultural development, is a significant area of research for scholars of Philippine, Indonesian, and Southeast Asian history, and is believed to be the source of Hindu and Buddhist elements in early Philippine culture, religion, and language. Because the Indonesian thalassocracies of Srivijaya and Majapahit acquired many of these Hindu and Buddhist elements through Indianization, the introduction of such elements to early Philippine cultures has sometimes been referred to as indianization. In more recent scholarship, it is termed localization, as in, e.g., localization of Hindu and Buddhist beliefs. Some scholars also place the Philippine archipelago within the outermost reaches of the Indosphere, along with Northern Vietnam, where the Hindu and Buddhist elements were not directly introduced by Indian travellers.

The most updated scholarship notes that there is no evidence of direct political or economic interaction between India and the various polities of the Philippine archipelago prior to the Philippines' European colonial era. Scholars such as Milton Osborne and F. Landa Jocano instead suggest that "indirect cultural influence" mostly arrived through these early Philippine polities' relations with the Srivijaya and Majapahit empires. during the 10th through the early 14th centuries. This updates the theories of earlier scholars, who posited that Indian elements in Philippine culture suggested relations between the two societies as early as the 2nd and 3rd centuries BCE. This also places the Philippines and the northern part of Vietnam outside the pattern of "Indianization" which took place elsewhere in Southeast Asia.

== History ==
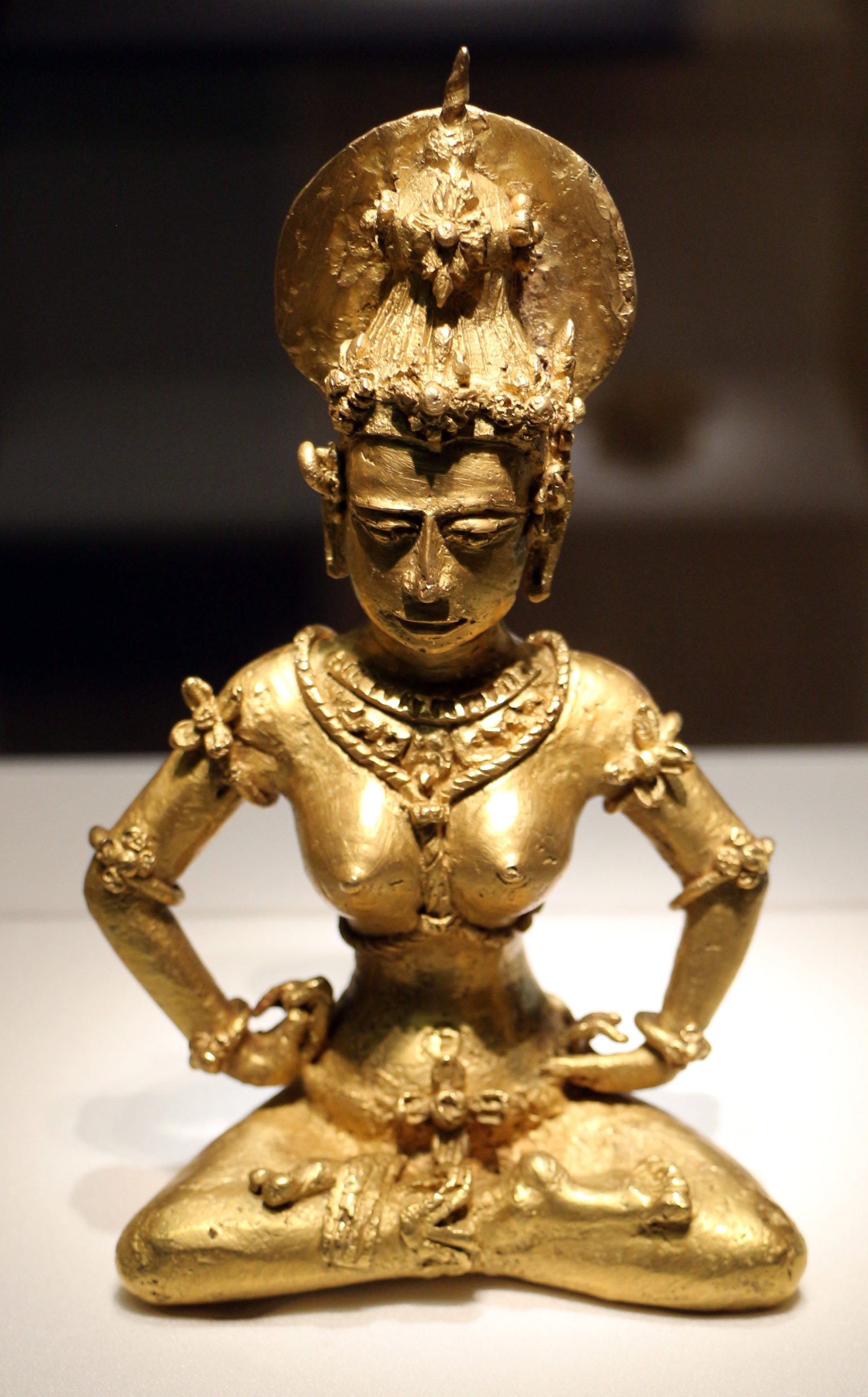
The Agusan image statue (900–950 CE) discovered in 1917 on the banks of the Wawa River near Esperanza, Agusan del Sur, Mindanao in the Philippines.

Historians prior to the later part of the twentieth century such as Zaide and Manuel generally believed that Srivijaya and Majapahit played a significant role in the development of cultures throughout the Philippine archipelago, although the degree of Srivijayan influence was later questioned in seminal works by Jocano and Scott.

Hindu and Buddhist influences first reached Nusantara or Maritime Southeast Asia as early as the first century. There are two major theories for the arrival of Hinduism in the region, both focusing on Indonesia. The first is that South Indian sea traders brought Hinduism with them, and second being that Indonesian royalty welcomed Indian religions and culture, and it is they who first adopted these spiritual ideas followed by the masses. Either way, Indonesian islands adopted both Hindu and Buddhist ideas, fusing them with pre-existing native folk religion and Animist beliefs.

This meant that the Buddhism and Hinduism introduced into the Philippine archipelago by the Srivijaya and the Majapahit were of a distinctly (Insular) Southeast Asian variant, as Osborne, in his 2004 history of Southeast Asia, notes:

Much, but not all, of this culture was absorbed by the local population and joined to their existing cultural patterns.[…] Because Indian culture “came” to Southeast Asia, one must not think that Southeast Asians lacked a culture of their own. Indeed, the generally accepted view is that Indian culture made such an impact on Southeast Asia because it fitted easily with the existing cultural patterns and religious beliefs of populations that had already moved a considerable distance along the path of civilization.[…] Southeast Asians, to summarize the point, borrowed but they also adapted. In some very important cases, they did not need to borrow at all."

=== Possible influence through early contacts with the Srivijaya ===
Popular literature and some 20th century history textbooks often suggest that Hindu and Buddhist cultural influences first came to the Philippines through early contacts with the Srivijayan and Majapahit thalassocracies. Jocano notes, however, that there is insufficient physical evidence to suggest that Philippine polities traded extensively with the Srivijayan empire. He suggests that contact between Philippine polities and the Srivijaya was probably limited to small-scale trade.

=== Influence through trade with the Majapahit ===
Jocano suggests that the Hindu and Buddhist cultural influences on Philippine cultures actually probably came through the Majapahit, as evidenced by significant archeological findings:

"Philippine-Indonesian relations during precolonial times became intensified during the rise of the Majapahit Empire. It was during this time that much of the so-called Indian cultural influence reached the Philippines through Indonesia. But what penetrated into our country, particularly in the seaport communities, was already the modified version of the original Hindu cultural traits."

== Manifestations of cultural influence ==
Because physical evidence regarding the degree to which India influenced the Philippines prior to the Spanish conquista is rather sparse, scholars have held differing views on this matter over the years. Preeminent Filipino Anthropologist F. Landa Jocano (2001) notes:

"Except for a few artifacts and identified loanwords that have been accepted as proofs of Indian-Philippine relations, there are meager intrusive materials to sustain definite views concerning the range of Indian prehistoric influence in the country. Many generalizations [that] have so far been advanced merely obscure the basic issues of Philippine cultural development. Even archeological data, mostly trade items, must be critically evaluated before they are judged as evidence of direct contacts."

Jocano lists the various streams of the evidence which support the assertion that this influence reached the Philippines include:

"Syllabic writing; artifacts in the form of different figurines made of clay, gold, and bronze that were dug in various sites in the Philippines; and 336 loanwords identified by Professor Francisco to be Sanskrit in origin, with 150 of them identified as the origin of some major Philippine terms."

=== The Agusan image ===
One major artifact often presented as physical evidence of early Indian influence in the Philippines is the "golden image of Agusan" artifact, a 1.79 kilogram, 21 carat Mataram-period gold image discovered by a Manobo woman named Bilay Campos in Esperanza, Agusan in 1918.

H. Otley Beyer interpreted the image as that of a Sivaite goddess, but with the religiously important hand signals improperly copied by local (probably Mindanao) workmen. Thus it suggests that Hinduism was already in the Philippines before Magellan arrived, but also suggests that the early Filipinos had an imperfect version of Hinduism which they got from the Majapahit.

=== The Laguna copperplate inscription ===
Another artifact often presented as physical evidence of early Indonesian and Indian influence in the Philippines is the 10th century Laguna Copperplate Inscription (LCI), found in 1989 and deciphered in 1992 by Dutch anthropologist Antoon Postma, and famous as the earliest known written document found in the Philippines.

The (LCI) was written in a variety of the Old Malay language, using the Old Kawi script, and contains numerous loanwords from Sanskrit and a few non-Malay vocabulary elements whose origin may be Old Javanese. The use of Sanskrit loanwords is considered evidence of Indian cultural influences on the cultures of the Malay Archipelago, which in turn had close trade and cultural ties with early Philippine polities, including those mentioned in the LCI.

=== Sanskrit loanwords and scripts ===
According to Jocano, a total of 336 loanwords were identified by Professor Juan R. Francisco to be Sanskrit in origin, "with 150 of them identified as the origin of some major Philippine terms." Many of these loanwords concerned governance and mythology, which were the particular concern of the Maginoo class, indicating a desire of members of that class to validate their status as rulers by associating themselves with foreign powers.

Indian honorifics also influenced the Filipino honorifics. Examples of these include Raja, Rani, Maharlika, Datu, etc. which were transmitted from Indian culture to Philippines via Malays and Srivijaya empire.

The origins of various pre-colonial native Filipino scripts such as the Baybayin, the Visayan as badlit, the Ilocano kur-itan/kurditan, and the Kapampangan kudlitan, can be traced to the Brahmic scripts of India and first recorded in the 16th century.

=== Folk literature ===
The most prominent example of Indian cultural influence on early Philippine folk literature is the case of the Maharadia Lawana, a Maranao epic which tells a local version of the Indian epic Ramayana, first documented by Filipino anthropologist Juan R. Francisco in the late 1960s. Francisco believed that the Ramayana narrative arrived in the Philippines some time between the 17th to 19th centuries, via interactions with Javanese and Malaysian cultures which traded extensively with India.

Some Philippine High School textbooks have also suggested that the Ilocano epic Biag ni Lam-ang may have been influenced by Hindu epics the Mahabharata and Ramayana, although the textbooks do not substantiate this claim. Most of the scholarship around the poem focus instead on the incorporation of syncretistic elements from Roman Catholicism, with no mention of supposed Indian influence.

Philippine anthropologists and historiographers such as F. Landa Jocano suggest that such Hindu influences probably arrived in the Philippines through the extensive trade local cultures had with the Majapahit empire during the 14th through 16th centuries, although earlier scholars such as Juan R. Francisco and Josephine Acosta Pasricha had suggested earlier dates for this influence, during the 9th to 10th century AD.

== "Indirect Indianization" through Maritime Southeast Asia ==
=== "Indianization" in Maritime Southeast Asia ===
Historically Southeast Asia was under the influence of Ancient India, where numerous Indianized principalities and empires flourished for several centuries in Thailand, Myanmar, Cambodia, Laos, Singapore, Indonesia, Malaysia, and the southern part of Vietnam, with cultural influence also spreading indirectly to the mostly Austronesian cultures of the Philippine archipelago and the highly sinified culture of Northern Vietnam. The influence of Indian culture in these areas was given the term indianization. French archaeologist, George Cœdès, defined it as the expansion of an organized culture that was framed upon Indian originations of royalty, Hinduism and Buddhism and the Sanskrit language. This can be seen in the Indianization of Southeast Asia, spread of Hinduism and Buddhism.

=== "Indirect Indianization" in the Philippines ===
Historiographers — both from Southeast Asia in general, and the Philippines specifically — agree that the impact of "indianization" in Philippines was indirect in nature, occurring through contacts with the Majapahit culture. Osborne (2004) notes that Vietnam and the Philippines did not participate in the main wave of Indianization:

"In the case of Vietnam, who were in this period living under Chinese rule, the process of Indianization never took place. For a different reason – distant geographical location – neither did the Philippines participate in this process."

Jocano furthers:

"The Philippines is geographically outside the direct line of early commerce between India and the rest of Southeast Asia. Moreover, the island world of Indonesia, with Sumatra and Java controlling the traffic of trade, functioned as a sieve for whatever influence (cultural, social, and commercial) India might have had to offer beyond the Indonesian archipelago.[...]Thus, it can be said that Indian Influence filtered into the Philippines only indirectly."

=== Degree and nature of "influence" in the Philippines ===
Regardless of how and when it actually happened, Historiographers specializing in Southeast Asia note that this "influence" was cultural and religious, rather than military or political in nature. For example, Osborne, in his 2004 history of Southeast Asia, notes:

Beginning in the 2nd and third centuries C.E. there was a slow expansion of [Indian] cultural contacts with the Southeast Asian region. It was an uneven process, with some areas receiving Indian influence much later than others, and the degree of influence varying from century to century. [...] Indianization did not mean there was a mass migration of Indian population into Southeast Asia. Rather, a relatively limited number of traders and priest scholars brought Indian culture in its various forms to Southeast Asia where much, but not all, of this culture was absorbed by the local population and joined to their existing cultural patterns.

Osborne further emphasizes that this "indianization" of Southeast Asia did not per-se overwrite existing indigenous patterns, cultures, and beliefs:

"Because Indian culture “came” to Southeast Asia, one must not think that Southeast Asians lacked a culture of their own. Indeed, the generally accepted view is that Indian culture made such an impact on Southeast Asia because it fitted easily with the existing cultural patterns and religious beliefs of populations that had already moved a considerable distance along the path of civilization.[…] Southeast Asians, to summarize the point, borrowed but they also adapted. In some very important cases, they did not need to borrow at all."

=== Localization of Hindu and Buddhist beliefs ===
Milner (2011) suggests that the cultural adaptation of Hindu and Buddhist beliefs in Maritime Southeast Asia is better characterized as "localization," which Wolters (1999) describes as a process by which foreign ideas ("specifically Indian materials") could be "fractured and restated and therefore drained of their original significance" in the process of being adopted into "various local complexes."

== See also ==
- Butuan (historical polity)
- Cebu (historical polity)
- Indosphere
- Greater India
- Indian Filipino
- History of Indian influence on Southeast Asia
- List of India-related topics in the Philippines
