= List of India-related topics in the Philippines =

India–Philippines relations

- India: Philippines

Diplomatic mission
- Embassy of India 2190 Paraiso, Makati, Metro Manila, Philippines Phone:+63 922 340 4676 Google map: Embassy of Philippines; 50-N Nyaya Marg, Chanakyapuri, New Delhi 110021, India; Phone: +91 11 2611 0152; Google map

Envoy
- Ambassador Mr. Lalduhthlana Ralte: Ambassador Ms. Teresita C. Daza

India and the Philippines have historic ties going back over 3000 years and there are over 150,000 people of Indian origin in Philippines.

Iron Age finds in the Philippines also point to the existence of trade between Tamil Nadu in South India and the Philippine islands during the ninth and tenth centuries B.C. The influence of the culture of India on the culture of the Philippines intensified from the 2nd through the late 14th centuries CE.

The Indian-Filipinos are Philippine citizens of Indian descent. The NRI are Indian citizens living in Philippines.

This is an alphabetical list:

== History ==
Historic Indosphere cultural influence zone of Greater India for transmission of elements of Indian elements such as the honorific titles, naming of people, naming of places, mottos of organisations and educational institutes as well as adoption of Hinduism, Buddhism, Indian architecture, martial arts, Indian music and dance, traditional Indian clothing, and Indian cuisine, a process which has also been aided by the ongoing historic expansion of Indian diaspora.

Locations of pre-colonial principalities, polities, kingdoms and sultanates in the Philippine archipelago

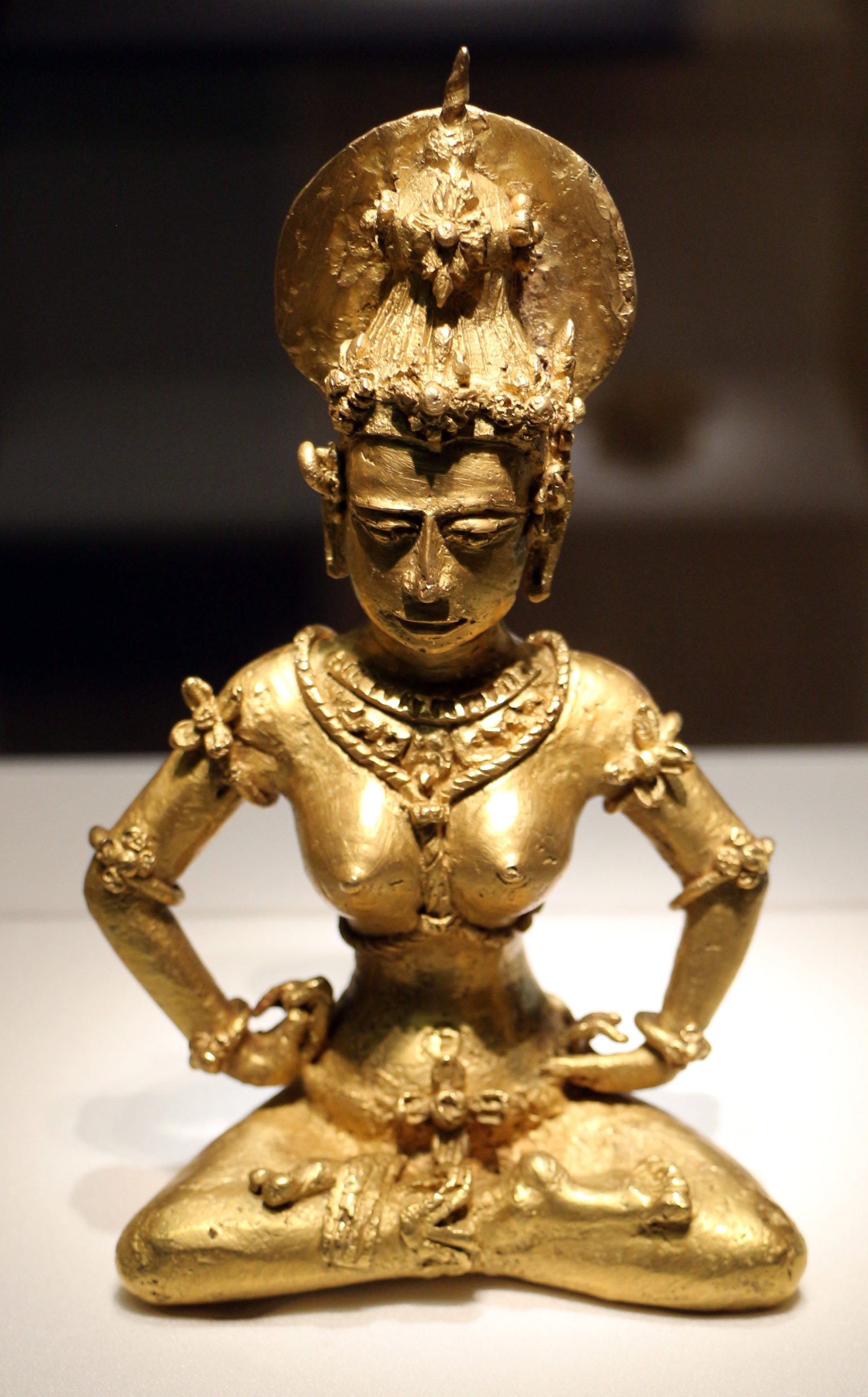
The Agusan image statue (900–950 CE) discovered in 1917 on the banks of the Wawa River near Esperanza, Agusan del Sur, Mindanao in the Philippines.

=== Indianisation concepts ===
- Indianisation
  - Greater India
    - Mandala (political model)
  - Indosphere
    - Sanskritisation
      - One of the pre-Spanish pre-Catholic pre-colonial ancient native Names of the Philippines is Maharlika "freeman" from ancient Indian language Sanskrit. And they are proposals to rename the Philippines to this name to remove the colonialism.
      - Early industries in Philippines that were introduced from India include boatbuilding, metal works, weaving of cotton clothes and quicklime mining method.
      - Flowers and their Sanskrit names introduced to Philippines by the Indian traders during the ancient times include sampaguita the National flower of Philippines which is one of National symbols of the Philippines and champaka.
      - Fruits and their Sanskrit names introduced to Philippines by the Indian traders during the ancient times include mango, nangka (Jackfruit) and sirisa.
      - Vegetables and their Sanskrit names introduced to Philippines by the Indian traders during the ancient times include ampalaya, patola and malunggay

=== Indianised kingdoms of early Philippines history ===
- Maritime Southeast Asia
- History of Indian influence on Southeast Asia
  - Indian influences in early Philippine polities
  - Indianised kingdoms of Philippines
  - Luzon
    - Around Manila and Pasig River were 3 polities which were earlier Hindu-Buddhist, later Islamic and then subsumed and converted to Catholicism by Spanish in 16th century
      - Namayan polity was confederation of barangays
      - Maynila (historical entity)
        - Rajah Sulayman (also Sulayman III, 1558–1575), Indianized Kingdom of Maynila
        - Rajah Matanda (1480–1572), ruler of the Indianized Kingdom of Maynila, together with Rajah Sulayman was co-ruled Maynila, their cousin Lakandula ruled Tondo. Rajah Sulayman was one of three kings that ruled parts of present-day Manila, and fought against the Spanish Empire's colonisation of the Philippines
      - Tondo (historical polity) on Pasig river near Manila
        - Lakandula, was a raja who was cousin of Rajah Sulayman and Rajah Matanda
        - Laguna Copperplate Inscription, earliest known written document found in the Philippines, in Indianized Kawi script with Sanskrit loanwords
    - Ma-i, a Buddhist kingdom in Mindoro island, from before 10th century till the 14th century
  - Visayas
    - Cebu at Singhapala (Mabolo in Cebu city on Mahinga creek) capital city in southern Cebu island was Hindu kingdom founded by Sri Lumay or Rajamuda Lumaya, a half-Tamil and half-Malay from Sumatra. Cebu was subsumed by Spanish in 16th century.
      - King Sri Lumay was half-Tamil and half-Malay, noted for his strict policies in defending against Moro Muslim raiders and slavers from Mindanao. His use of scorched earth tactics to repel invaders gave rise to the name Kang Sri Lumayng Sugbu (literally "that of Sri Lumay's great fire") to the town, which was later shortened to Sugbu ("scorched earth").
      - Sri Bantug, king and successor son of Sri Lumay
      - Rajah Humabon, king and successor son of Sri Batung
        - Battle of Mactan on 27 April 1521 between Rajah Humabon and Ferdinand Magellan in which Lapulapu fought on side of Rajah, resulting in the death of Ferdinand Magellan.
        - Lapulapu, warrior under Rajah Humabon, Lapulapu fought Spanish
        - Ferdinand Magellan, Portuguese explorer on hired by Spanish empire
      - Rajah Tupas (Sri Tupas), nephew and successor of Rajah Humabon, last to rule the kingdom before subsumed by Spanish Miguel López de Legazpi in the battle of Cebu during 1565.
      - Caste system: Below the rulers were the Timawa, the feudal warrior class of the ancient Visayan societies of the Philippines who were regarded as higher than the uripon (commoners, serfs, and slaves) but below the Tumao (royal nobility) in the Visayan social hierarchy. They were roughly similar to the Tagalog maharlika caste. Lapu Lapu was a Timawa.
      - A crude Buddhist medallion and a copper statue of a Hindu Deity, Ganesha, has been found by Henry Otley Beyer in 1921 in ancient sites in Puerto Princesa, Palawan and in Mactan, Cebu. The crudeness of the artifacts indicates they are of local reproduction. Unfortunately, these icons were destroyed during World War II. However, black and white photographs of these icons survive.
    - Madja-as of Panay island, a supra-baranganic polity
  - Mindanao
    - Butuan in northeast Mindanao, Hindu kingdom existed earlier than 10th century and ruled till being subsumed by Spanish in 16th century.
      - Golden Tara (Agusan image) is a golden statue that was found in Agusan del Sur in north east Mindanao.
      - Mount Diwata: named after diwata concept of Philippines based on the devata deity concept of Hinduism
    - Confederate States of Lanao of Muslims in Maguindanao in northwestern Mindanao from 15th century till present day
    - Sultanate of Maguindanao in Cotabato in far west Mindanao from split from Srivijaya Hindu ancestors in 16th century and ruled till early 20th century, originally converted by sultan of Johor in 16th century but maintained informal kinship with Hindu siblings who are now likely Christians
    - Sultanate of Sulu in southwestern Mindanao, established in 1457 by a Johore-born Muslim explorer, gained independence from the Bruneian Empire in 1578 and lasted till 1986. It also covered the area in northeastern side of Borneo, stretching from Marudu Bay to Tepian Durian in present-day Kalimantan.
    - Lupah Sug, a predecessor Hindu state before the establishment of Sultanate of Sulu.
      - Maimbung principality: Hindu polity, predecessor of Lupah Su]] Muslim sultanate. Sulu that time was called Lupah Sug The Principality of Maimbung, populated by Buranun people (or Budanon, literally means "mountain-dwellers"), was first ruled by a certain rajah who assumed the title Rajah Sipad the Older. According to Majul, the origins of the title rajah sipad originated from the Hindu sri pada, which symbolises authority. The Principality was instituted and governed using the system of rajahs. Sipad the Older was succeeded by Sipad the Younger.

=== Indians in Philippines during colonial era ===
- 1762–1764 British Manila
  - Battle of Manila (1762) by the East India Company's Indian soldiers during Anglo-Spanish War (1761–63)
  - Cainta in Rizal: historic colonial era settlement of escaped Indians sepoys of British East India Company
- Indian Filipino: Filipino citizens with part or whole Indian blood

=== Key Indianised Hindu-Buddhist artifacts found in Philippines ===
- Luzon
  - Laguna Copperplate Inscription in Luzon, earliest known written document found in the Philippines, in Indianized Kawi script with Sanskrit loanwords
  - Palawan Tabon Caves Garuda Gold Pendant found in the Tabon caves in the island of Palawan, is an image of Garuda, the eagle bird who is the mount of Hindu deity Vishnu
- Visayas
  - Cebu Buddhist medallion and copper statue of Hindu Deity: A crude Buddhist medallion and a copper statue of a Hindu Deity, Ganesha, has been found by Henry Otley Beyer in 1921 in ancient sites in Puerto Princesa, Palawan and in Mactan, Cebu. The crudeness of the artifacts indicates they are of local reproduction. Unfortunately, these icons were destroyed during World War II. However, black and white photographs of these icons survive.
- Mindanao
  - Golden Tara (Agusan image) from Kingdom of Butuan in northeast Mindanao is a golden statue that was found in Agusan del Sur in north east Mindanao.

== Language ==
- Baybayin: a Philippine script classified as an abugida, part of the Brahmic family of scripts
- Indian honorifics also influenced the Malay, Thai, Filipino and Indonesian honorifics. Examples of these include Raja, Rani, Maharlika, Datu, etc. which were transmitted from Indian culture to Philippines via Malays and Srivijaya empire
- Influence of Indian languages on Tagalog language
- Sanskrit language loanwords in Cebuano language

== Sports ==
Filipino sports influenced by the Indian martial arts

- Filipino martial arts such as Kalis and others have been inspired by the Indian martial arts

== Art, music, epics and chants ==
Filipino epics and chants inspired by the Indian Hindu religious epics Ramayana and Mahabharata.

- Alim and Hudhud Oral traditions of Ifugao of Ifugao people of the Cordillera Administrative Region in Luzon island. The Hudhud – the Ifugao epic of the Ifugao was chosen as one of the 11 Masterpieces of the Oral and Intangible Heritage of Humanity in 2001 and formally inscribed as a UNESCO Intangible Cultural Heritage in 2008.
- Biag ni Lam-ang (English: "The Life of Lam-ang") is an epic poem of the Ilocano people from the Ilocos region.
- Ibalong epic of Bikol region of southeast Luzon.
- "Aginid, Bayok sa atong Tawarik", a Bisayan epic of Cebu.
- Bayok, an epic of Marano people of northwestern Mindanao.

Music instrument

- Kudyapi, native Filipino guitar of Maranao, Manobo and Maguindanao people, is influenced by the Indian classical music concepts of melody and scale.

== Religion ==
- Buddhism in Southeast Asia
  - Buddhism in the Philippines
- Hinduism in Southeast Asia
  - Hinduism in the Philippines
- Related topics
  - Religion in pre-colonial Philippines had Indianized Hindu and Buddhist influence
  - Nanak Darbar Indian Sikh Temple, Iloilo

== People ==
- List of Filipino-Indian people
- Josephine Acosta Pasricha, PhD (Indology) – Filipina Indologist
- Juan R. Francisco, PhD (Indology) – Filipino Indologist
- Filipinos in India

== Business ==
- Business process outsourcing to India
- Business process outsourcing in the Philippines
- Indian Companies, some operate in Philippines also
- Murrah buffalo originally from the Central Institute for Research on Buffaloes, Hisar, Haryana, India was exported to Philippine Carabao Center in Nueva Ecija to improve the breed of Filipino carabao
- Maritime Southeast Asia under the influence of Indosphere

== Politics and travel ==
- India–Philippines relations
- Visa requirements for Indian citizens
- Visa requirements for Filipino citizens
- Tourism in the Philippines
- Tourism in India

== Gallery ==
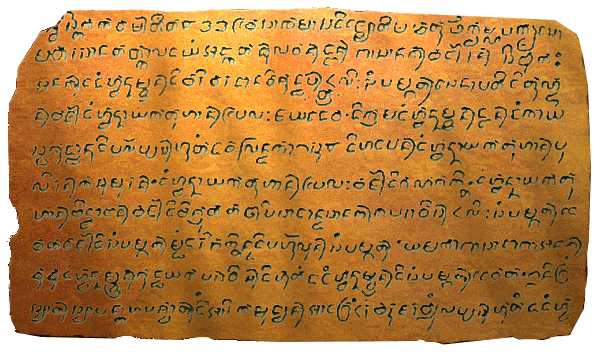
Laguna Copperplate Inscription in Kawi script with Sanskrit loanwords

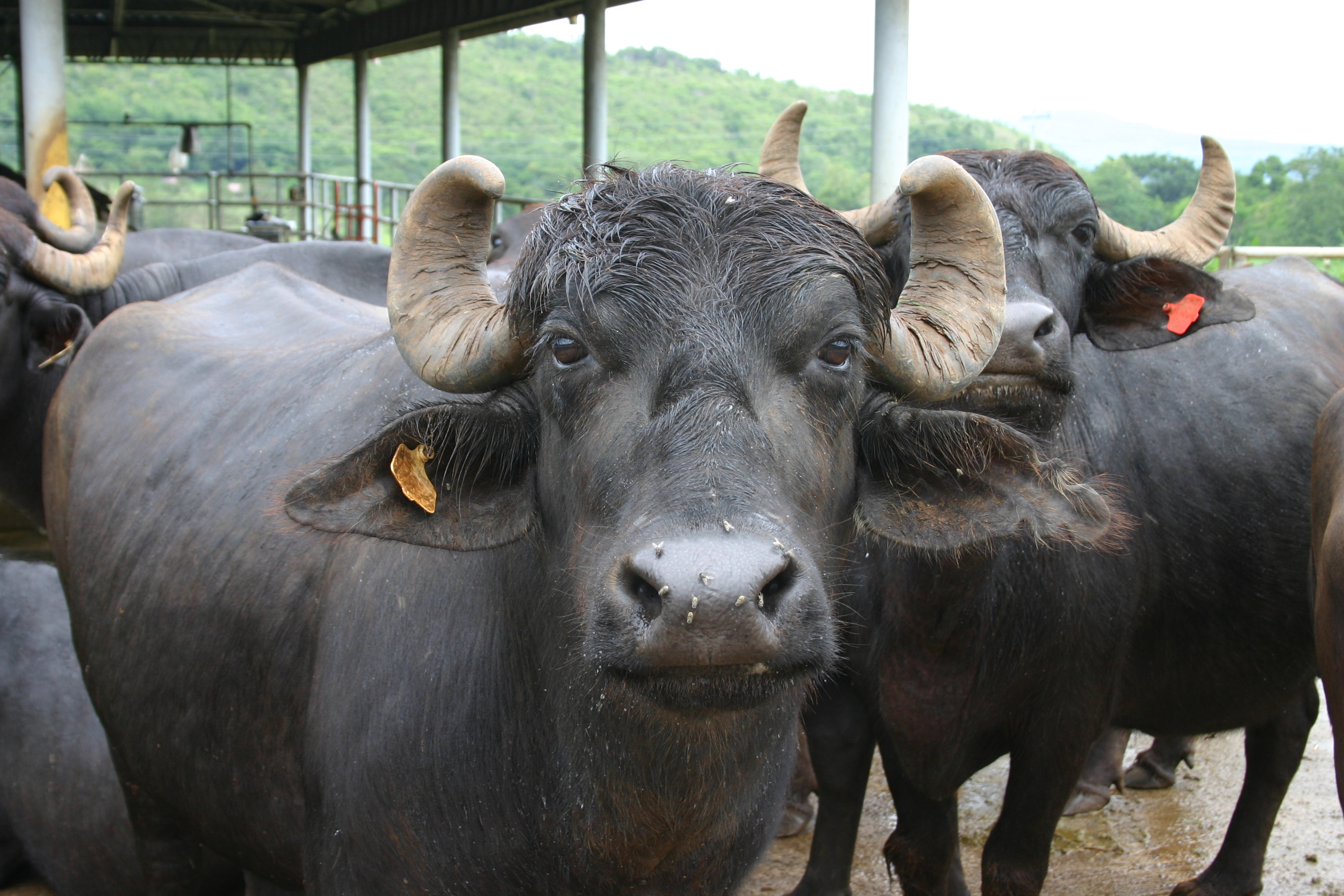
Murrah buffalo originally from Punjab and Haryana states of India was exported to Philippine Carabao Center in Nueva Ecija to improve the breed of Filipino carabao

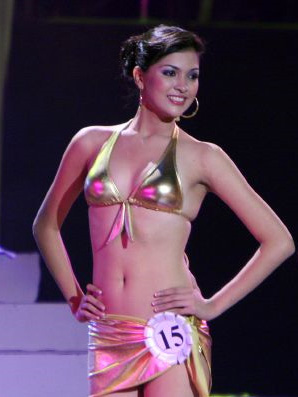
Janina San Miguel, Binibining Pilipinas 2008

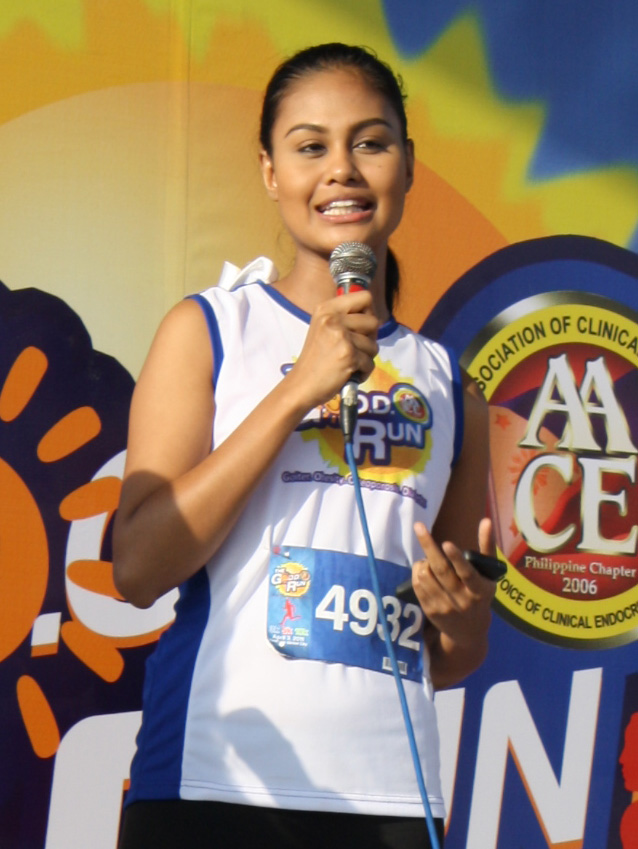
Venus Raj, Binibining Pilipinas 2010

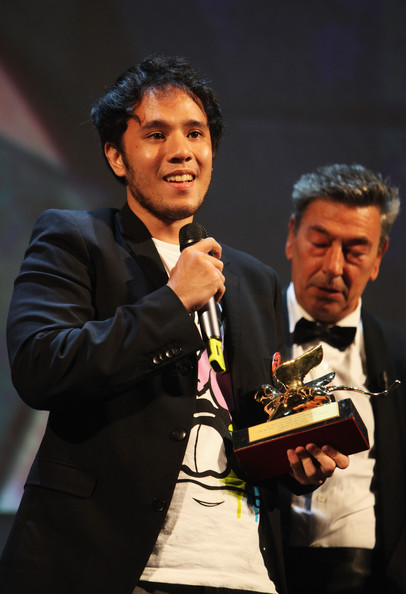
Pepe Diokno movie director and producer

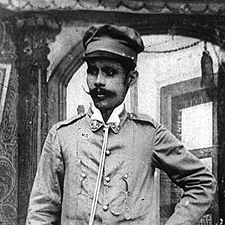
Juan Cailles independence revolutionary

== See also ==
- Indian Australians
- Indian Singaporeans
- Indian Indonesians
- Indian Malaysians
- Filipino Australian
- Australian Indian Ocean Territories
