= Philippines–Sri Lanka relations =

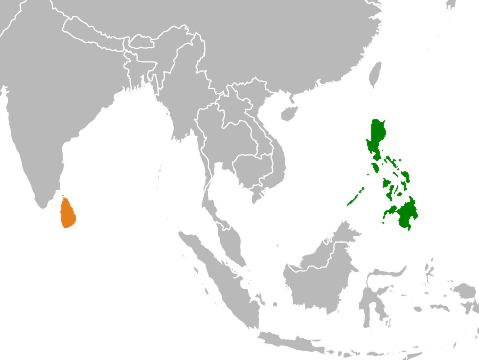

- Philippines: Sri Lanka

The Philippines–Sri Lanka relations refers to the bilateral relations between the Philippines and Sri Lanka. The Philippines has a non resident ambassador in Dhaka. Sri Lanka has an embassy in Manila.

== History ==
=== Pre-Colonial ===
Philippines Sri Lanka relations began even before the respective countries were colonized by Spain and Portugal. Genetic studies point to the Philippines being the destination of immigrants from South Asia (Sri Lanka included). The proliferation of Sanskrit and Tamil words in Filipino languages show the influence South Asia had in the establishment of Hindu and Buddhist kingdoms in the Philippines. The epic of Ramanaya which is set in Sri Lanka has a localized version named Maharadia Lawana, performed among the Maranao people. Migration wasn't only one way though, Sri Lanka received Lucoes trader-immigrants (People from Luzon Island at the Philippines), as Lungshanoid pottery from Luzon was excavated from Sri Lankan burial sites. Sri Lanka was also part of the Chola Empire, an empire which conquered parts of Srivijaya in South East Asia and would possibly have connections to the Philippines. Sri Lumay, a half Tamil and half Malay prince of the Chola Empire settled in the Visayas and founded the Rajahnate of Cebu.

=== Colonial Era ===
During the Spanish colonial era of the Philippines, people from South Asia were captured as slaves, but those slaves mostly came from the parts of Bengal and South India. However, there were slaves from Sri Lanka and those slaves interacted with the Minnanese, Tagalogs and Kapampangans of Central Luzon.

During the 19th century, José Rizal, a national hero in the Philippines, visited Ceylon (which was under British Rule) in May 1882. He travelled on boarding on the Djemnah which was a French Ship as the journey to Colombo, Ceylon would improve his knowledge of French. Rizal arrived in Point De Galle which he described as " A tropical vegetation formed by elegant palm." Rizal visited the Oriental Hotel and Temple of the Buddha which for the first time, saw how Sri Lankan Sinhalese Buddhists prayed. Rizal also Visited Colombo which a suit in the Grand Oriental Hotel was named after him.

=== Post-Colonial ===
Formal Diplomatic relations between the Philippines and Sri Lanka were established in January 1961 with the Philippines opening a diplomatic mission office in Colombo. Sri Lanka has a Chargé d'affaires-level mission based in Japan with the Philippines. The diplomatic missions of both countries in Manila and Colombo were elevated to embassies in 1964 and 1966, respectively. However, both countries decided to close their embassies on June 30, 1993.

In September 1998, Sri Lanka reopened its diplomatic mission in Manila, driven by an interest to coordinate with the Asian Development Bank based in Mandaluyong, Metro Manila. The Philippines, as a founding member of the Association of Southeast Asian Nations (ASEAN), also contributed to the decision to reopen its embassy. To commemorate positive bilateral relations, Sri Lanka gave an elephant named Mali to the Philippines, which is now being cared for by the City Government of Manila through the Manila Zoological and Botanical Gardens.

The Philippines maintains an honorary consulate in Sri Lanka.

== Economic relations ==
There are 400 to 500 Overseas Filipino Workers stationed in Sri Lanka.
