= India–Philippines relations =

- India: Philippines

Diplomatic mission
- Embassy of India, Manila: Embassy of the Philippines, New Delhi

Envoy
- Ambassador Harsh Kumar Jain: Ambassador Josel Francisco Ignacio

India–Philippines relations (Filipino: Ugnayang Pilipinas-India), also known as the Indian–Filipino relations or Indo–Filipino relations, are the bilateral relations between India and the Philippines. Diplomatic relations between India and the Philippines were established in 1949. India maintains an embassy in Manila, whilst the Philippines maintains one in New Delhi. A treaty of friendship was signed between the Philippines and India on 11 July 1952, while a strategic partnership between the two countries was established on 5 August 2025.

== History ==
=== Early history ===
Through the Srivijaya and Majapahit empires, Indian influences would have reached the Philippines from the 10th through the early 14th centuries, based on the events in these two regions, and through direct migration from the Indian subcontinent to the Philippines. During this time, scholars and traders would refer to the Philippines as Panyupayana, a term which emanated from the geopolitical orientation of the Indians, that started with the cosmological orientation. This is manifested by the Puranas and other Indian literature, such as Ramayana and Mahabharata, which was later absorbed by indigenous cultures in the Philippines, leading to localized versions such as the epic Maharadia Lawana. Artifacts of Indian orientation have been found in a lot of islands in the Philippines. The golden image of the female Bodhisattva which was found in Agusan, was related to the development of Buddhism in Southeast Asia dating back to the late 13th and 14th centuries. The introduction of Sanskrit words and literature may be dated to the 10th and 12th centuries. Until now, Sanskrit words are still found in abundance in various Philippine languages. Then there is the folk narrative among the Maranao, known as Maharadia Lawana which shows an Indian character and whose story is very similar to the Indian epic Ramayana. The existence of rajanates in Philippine classic history, especially in Cebu, Butuan, and Sanmalan, show Indian influence, Cebu had a half-Tamil and half-Malay founder and ruler Sri Lumay and according to researcher Eric Casino, he believes the name of the first mentioned ruler of Butuan, Rajah Kiling is not Visayan in origin but rather, Indian, because Kiling is a local label for people coming from India. The Sejarah Melayu (Malay Annals) of the nearby country of Malaysia, refers to the similarly worded Keling as immigrant people from India. Sanmalan was ruled by a Rajah with the name of Chulan, the Malay pronunciation of the Tamil Chola. These point to heavy influence from Indian cultures. Hinduism was also prevalent in various societies in the Philippines, notably in central and southern islands, along with the banks of Manila Bay and Laguna de Bay. Genetic studies also show a migration of South Asians to the Philippines which is most evident among the Sama-Bajau ethnic group.

=== Colonial era ===
This era witnessed great demand in the Philippines for South Asian slaves captured from the Dravidian speaking South India area and Indo-European speaking Bengal Coast.

During the period 1762–1764, during the various Anglo-Spanish wars, 600 Sepoy (or native Indian) troops arrived in the Philippines as part of the military expedition of the East India Company. When the British troops withdrew, many of the Sepoys mutinied and refused to leave. They settled in what is now Cainta, Rizal. The region in and around Cainta still has many Sepoy descendants.

During the 18th century, there was robust trade between Manila and the Coromandel Coast of Bengal, involving Philippine exports of tobacco, silk, cotton, indigo, sugar cane and coffee.

=== Post-World War II era ===
The Philippines established diplomatic relations with India on 26 November 1949. The first Philippine envoy to India was Foreign Secretary Narciso Ramos.

Five years after India's independence in 1947, the Philippines and India signed a Treaty of Friendship on 11 July 1952 in Manila to strengthen the friendly relations existing between the two countries. Soon after, the Philippine Legation in New Delhi was established and then elevated to an embassy.

However, due to foreign policy differences as a result of the bipolar alliance structure of the Cold War, the development of bilateral relations was stunted. It was only in 1976 that relations started to normalize when Aditya Vikram Birla, one of India's successful industrialists, met with then-Philippine President Ferdinand Marcos to explore possibilities of setting up joint ventures in the Philippines. This resulted in the establishment of Indo-Philippine Textile Mills, Inc. (Indo-Phil), then the largest Indian investment in the country. Indo-Phil currently employs 2,000 Filipino workers and supplies 40% of Philippine domestic demand for yarn.

The Trade Agreement between the Philippines and India was signed on 29 May 1979. In 1995, following the first Philippine Trade Mission to India, a Joint Working Group and a Joint Business Council were set up to assess and identify potentials for trade as well as identify new areas for collaboration. Since then, bilateral meetings have been held regularly.

=== 21st-century relations ===
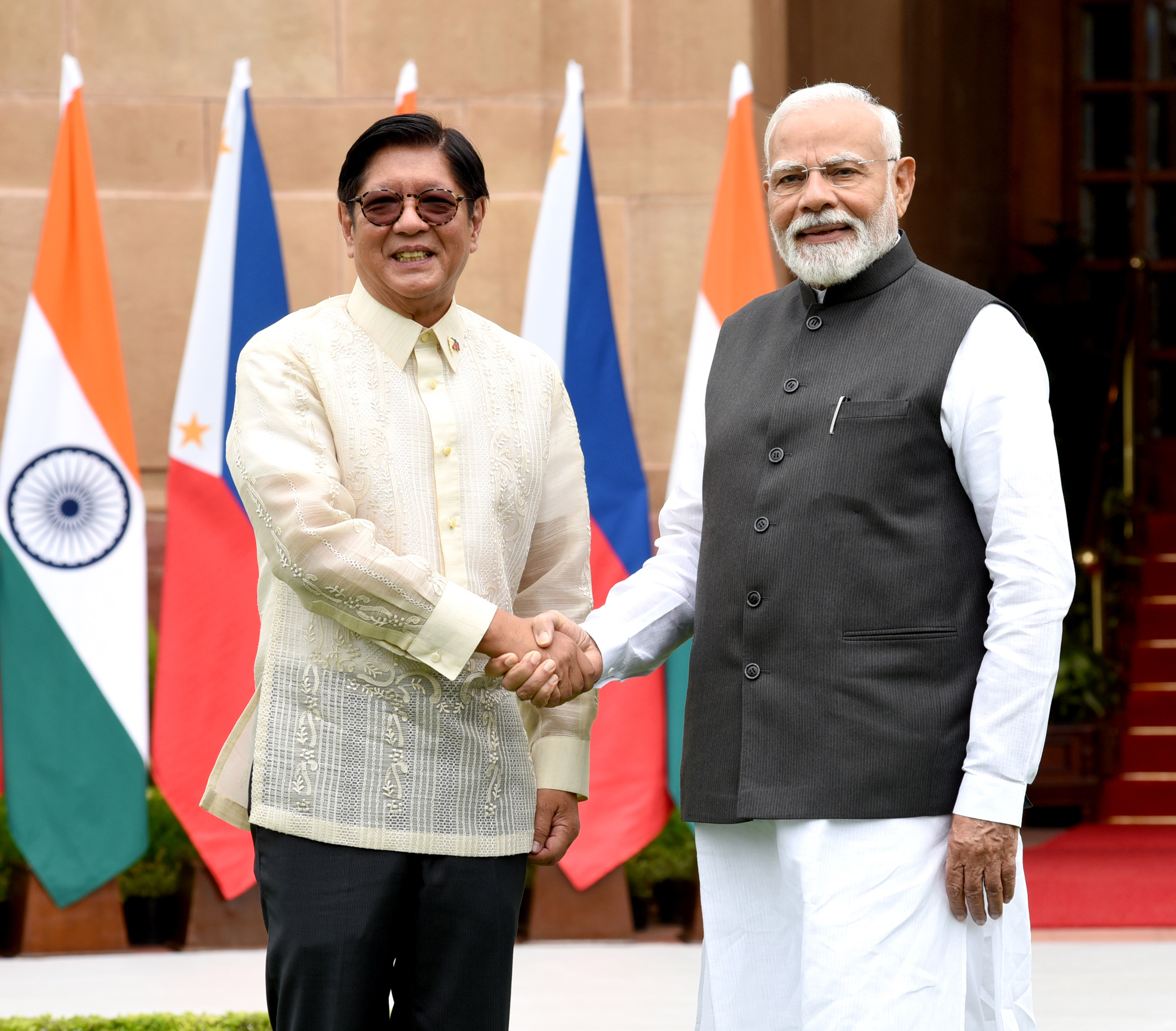
Philippine President Bongbong Marcos and Indian Prime Minister Narendra Modi at Hyderabad House, New Delhi, in 2025

Policy consultation talks between the two countries were established in 2000. The talks, which are held annually and conducted by senior officials of the foreign ministries of the two countries, aimed at discussing bilateral issues and regional and international issues of common concern.

Both countries signed a Joint Declaration for Co-operation to Combat International Terrorism to complement the ASEAN-India Joint Declaration to Combat International Terrorism, which was adopted by the Heads of Government and States of ASEAN and India on 8 October 2003 in Bali, Indonesia. The declaration seeks to enhance intelligence and information sharing on counter-terrorism measures; strengthen capacity-building efforts through training and education, capability, and readiness, including training and technical assistance; and continue working together in the fight against cybercrime and terrorist misuse of cyberspace.

The first RP–India Security Dialogue was held in Manila on 12 March 2004. The Philippines and India agreed to establish a security dialogue that would serve as a policy forum for sharing security assessments and for reviewing and giving direction to cooperation in bilateral/regional security and defence matters.

In commemoration of the 60th anniversary of Philippines–India diplomatic relations, and pursuant to Presidential Proclamation 1924, the month of November 2009 was proclaimed as Philippines–India Friendship Month by then-Philippine President Gloria Macapagal Arroyo.

The ASEAN–India Free Trade Area agreement signed by India in 2009 also includes the Philippines as a signatory.

In August 2025, on the 75th anniversary of bilateral relations, Indian Prime Minister Narendra Modi and Philippine President Bongbong Marcos announced the establishment of a strategic partnership between the two countries during the latter's state visit to India, the first by a Philippine president since Arroyo in 2007. India is the Philippines's fifth strategic partner after Australia, Japan, South Korea, and Vietnam. Modi also announced visa-free entry for Filipino tourists visiting India.

On 27 October 2025, at the 22nd ASEAN-India Summit in Kuala Lumpur, Philippine President Bongbong Marcos praised Indian Prime Minister Narendra Modi for India's consistent support for international law and the rule of law in the South China Sea, highlighting India's growing strategic and economic role in ASEAN, while PM Modi reaffirmed ASEAN centrality in India's Act East policy and declared 2026 the "Year of ASEAN-India Maritime Cooperation".

=== Joint Commission on Bilateral Co-operation ===
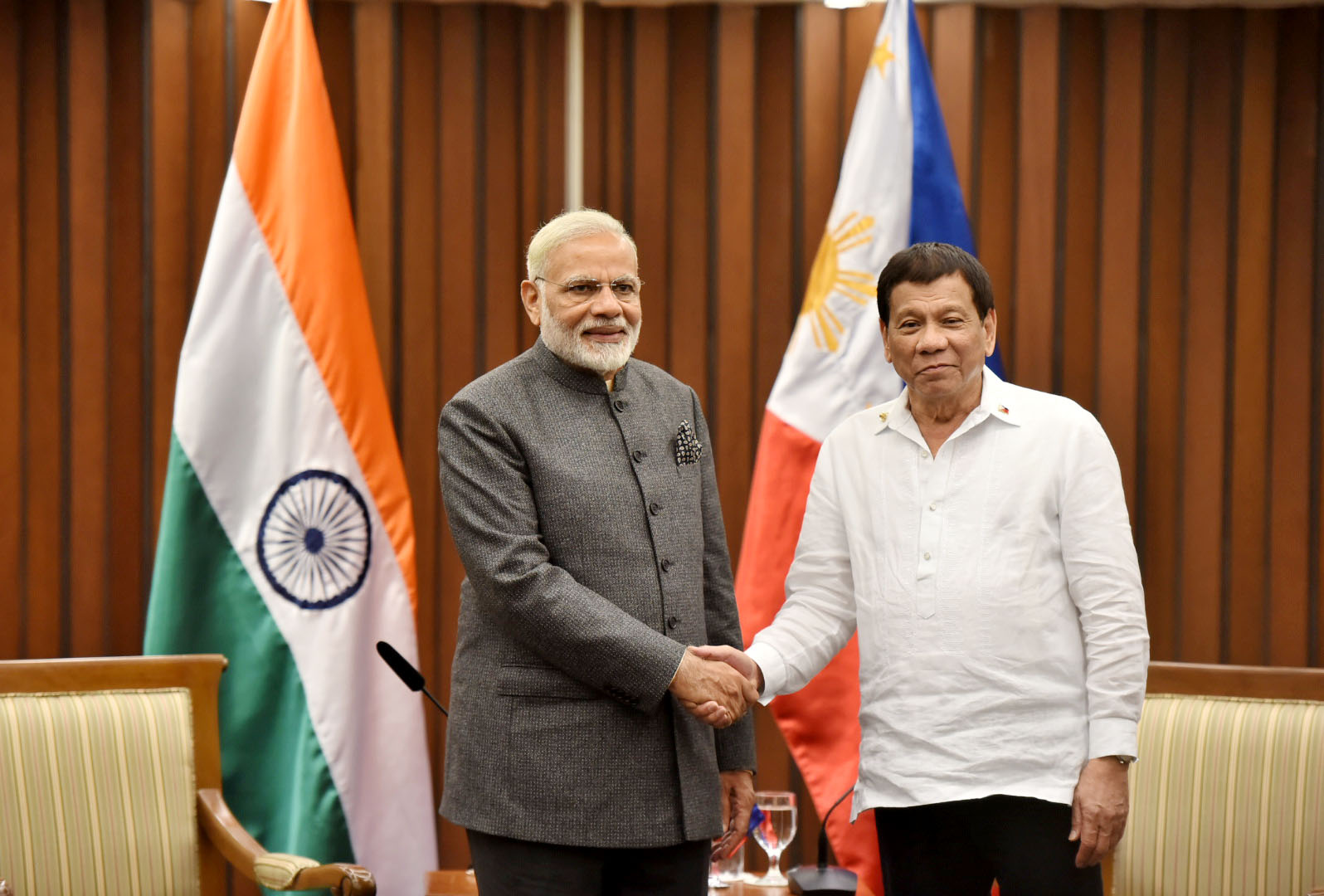
Indian Prime Minister Narendra Modi and Philippine President Rodrigo Duterte in Manila in 2017

The agreement to establish a Joint Commission on Bilateral Co-operation was signed during the state visit to India of President Gloria Macapagal Arroyo on 5 October 2007. The establishment of the Joint Commission on Bilateral Co-operation aims to further strengthen and develop the co-operation in the field of trade, economic, scientific, technological and other fields of co-operation. The meeting of the Joint Commission will be co-chaired by the two countries' foreign ministers, who will meet once every two years.

The inaugural session of the Joint Commission was held on 15 March 2011, co-chaired by Philippine Foreign Affairs Secretary Albert del Rosario, and was held in New Delhi. During the meeting both sides agreed to move forward on co-operative initiatives in various fronts (trade, agriculture, defence).

During the 2018 ASEAN–India Commemorative Summit in New Delhi, where the Delhi Declaration was signed, Philippines-India relations was one of the two most focal bilateral discussions made. India is targeting billions of investments in Philippine markets, notably in the pharmaceutical, information technology, energy, and transportation which would lead to the creation of 10,000 jobs.

In a joint statement of the 5th Joint Commission on bilateral cooperation between India and the Philippines, "they underlined the need for a peaceful settlement of disputes and for an adherence to international law, especially the UNCLOS and the 2016 Arbitral Award on the South China Sea in this regard."

== Cultural relations ==
Filipino culture had Indian influences. About 30 percent of the Tagalog language were loanwords from Sanskrit. The use of brass, bronze, copper and tin in Philippine decorative arts and metal works also had Indian origin. Early Filipino literature and folklore also had Indian influences such as the Maranao epic of Darangan and the Ifugao tale of Balituk. The Philippine folk belief regarding eclipses, where some narrates that the dragon called laho bites the moon or sun to cause the phenomenon is related to the Indian belief regarding the being Rahu from Hindu tradition.

== Military relations ==
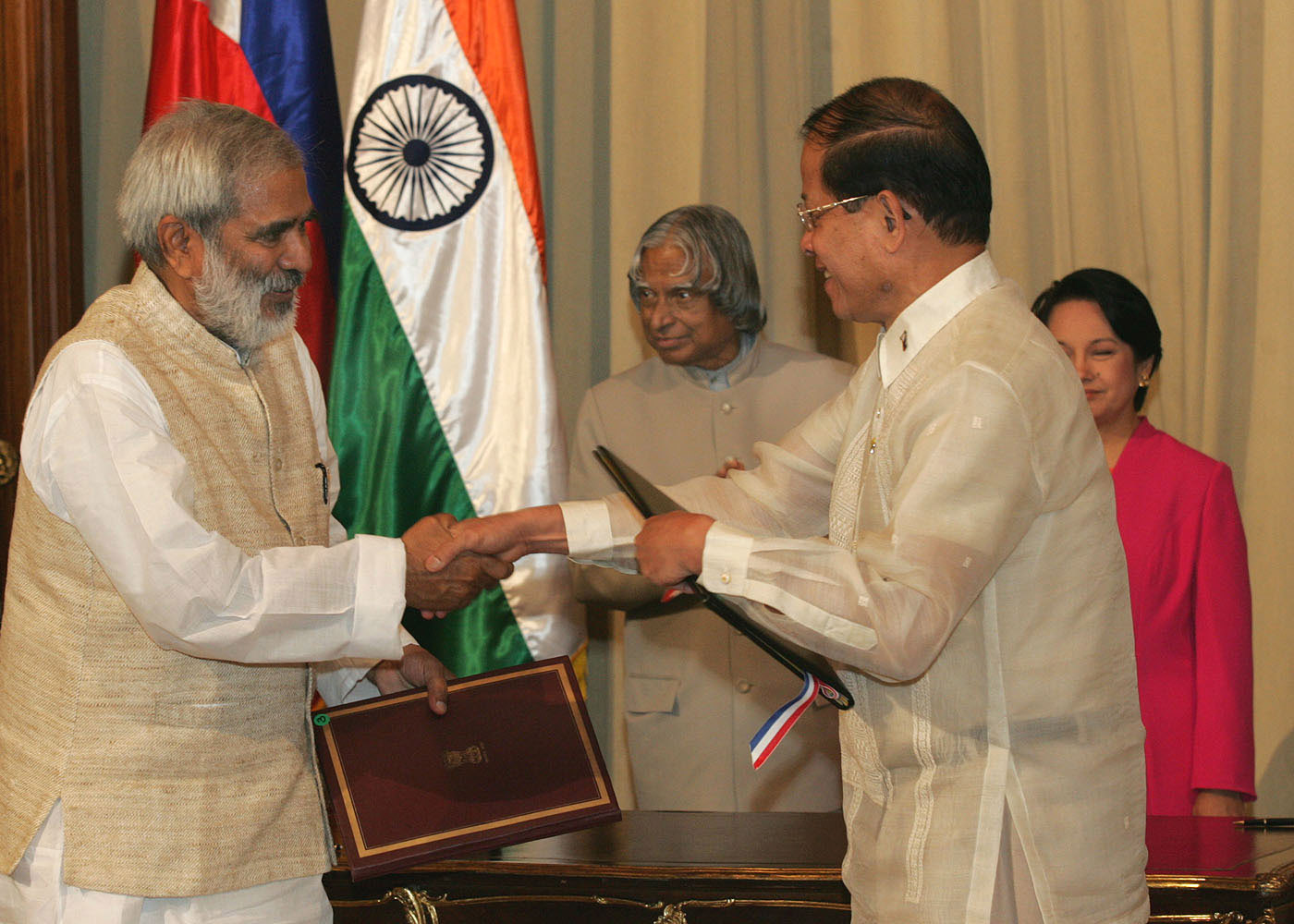
Indian Union Rural Development Minister Raghuvansh Prasad Singh signs a defence cooperation agreement with the Philippine government in the presence of Indian President A. P. J. Abdul Kalam and Philippine President Gloria Macapagal Arroyo in Manila, 2006.

The Philippines supported India's successful candidature for the non-permanent membership of the UN Security Council for the term 2011–12, and there is regular consultation between delegations of both countries in the UN and other multilateral fora. Several foreign service officers from the Philippines have attended the ASEAN diplomats' course that is held at the Sushma Swaraj Institute of Foreign Service in India. Indian navy and coast guard ships regularly visit the Philippines and hold consultations with their counterparts: the INS Satpura and INS Kadmatt visited Manila on 3–6 October 2017, Indian coast guard ship ICGS Samarth visited Manila on 7–10 January 2017, the INS Sahyadri and INS Shakti visited Manila on a goodwill visit to Subic Bay on 30 May – 2 June 2016; INS Sahyadri visited Manila on 1–4 November 2015; and from 20 to 23 August 2014; the ICGS Samudra Paheredar visited Manila from 19 to 22 September 2014; a flotilla of four Indian ships from the Eastern Fleet, namely the INS Shakti, INS Satpura, INS Ranjit and the INS Kirch visited Manila on a goodwill visit from 12 to 16 June 2013. The participation of officers of the armed forces of both countries in various specialized training courses in each other's countries has intensified, as have visits by National Defence College (NDC) delegations, including the first-ever NDC visit from the Philippines to India. A delegation from the College of Defence Management visited the Philippines from 23 to 31 October 2015, while a delegation from the Army High Command Course of India visited the Philippines from 10 to 14 November 2014.

The government of India sent an Indian Air Force flight with relief material for the victims of Typhoon Haiyan, which struck the Philippines on 7–8 November 2013. Following the loss of life, livelihood, and property as a result of Typhoon Bopha, which struck the southern Philippines in December 2012, the Indian government provided disaster relief assistance of US$200,000 to the Philippine government and $100,000 as disaster relief assistance following the October 2013 earthquake in Bohol. India announced an immediate relief assistance of $500,000 (equivalent to ₱25 million) on 11 July 2017 for the relief and rehabilitation efforts underway in Marawi which had come under siege on 23 May 2017, after armed terrorists belonging to the Maute group, owing allegiance to ISIS, took over the city.

In January 2022, Philippine Defense Secretary Gilbert Teodoro said that his country had finalised a deal to acquire a shore-based anti-ship missile system (BrahMos) from India for nearly $375 million to beef up its navy.

In August 2025, the Indian and Philippine navies began their first joint exercise in the West Philippine Sea. Among the ships that took part were the BRP Miguel Malvar, BRP Jose Rizal, INS Delhi, INS Kiltan, and the INS Shakti.

== Trade relations ==
According to India's Ministry of External Affairs, trade between India and the Philippines is at around US$1.6 billion. Economic relations have grown gradually over the years. Despite the impact of the ASEAN–India Free Trade Area on goods, the India–Philippine trade has, so far, been at around $1.981 billion in 2016–17. In 2016–17, India's exports amounted to US$1,487 million and imports worth US$494 million. India–Philippine trade in 2018–2019 has been at around $2.32 billion (exports from India to the Philippines—US $1,743 million—and imports from the Philippines to India—US $581 million). However, a number of growth drivers suggest a major and sustained growth in two-way trade and investment, helped by the conclusion of the India–ASEAN trade in services and investment agreements. Indian investment in the Philippines is mainly in the areas of textiles, garments, information technology, steel, aviation, chemicals, automobiles, and pharmaceuticals.

== Indian community in the Philippines ==
The Indian community in the Philippines, according to the Bureau of Immigration, is estimated to be about 120,000. Around 5,000 persons of Indian origin have acquired Filipino citizenship. Punjabis and Sindhis constitute the bulk of the community. Since the last ten years, there has been a growing number of professionals, estimated in the range of about 1500 persons, who are working in the Philippines in organizations such as the Asian Development Bank, International Rice Research Institute, and UN agencies, as well as in multinational corporations, BPOs, and with Indian joint ventures in the country.

The Philippines is also beginning to emerge as a destination for Indian students. There are more than 10,000 Indian students pursuing medical courses in various universities in the Philippines. Nearly 50 per cent of the students at the prestigious Asian Institute of Management in Manila are from India. The flying schools are also attractive, as instructions are in English and students do not have to learn local languages. Several universities in the Philippines, such as the University of Santo Tomas, the University of the Philippines Diliman, the University of Northern Philippines, the University of the Visayas, Adamson University, the University of Mindanao, and others have opened special "India chapters" in their prestigious libraries, which house the collection of books on India (gifted through the public diplomacy division of the Ministry of External Affairs). A bust of Mother Teresa has been installed in the University of Santo Tomas, gifted by the Indian Council for Cultural Relations.

In 2024, arrivals increased by about 12%, nearly 80,000 visitors. Since June 8, 2025, Indian tourists can visit the Philippines without a visa.

== See also ==
- Foreign relations of India
- Foreign relations of the Philippines
- List of India-related topics in the Philippines
- Indian settlement in the Philippines
- Filipinos in India
