= Agusan image =

Solid gold statue found in the Philippines

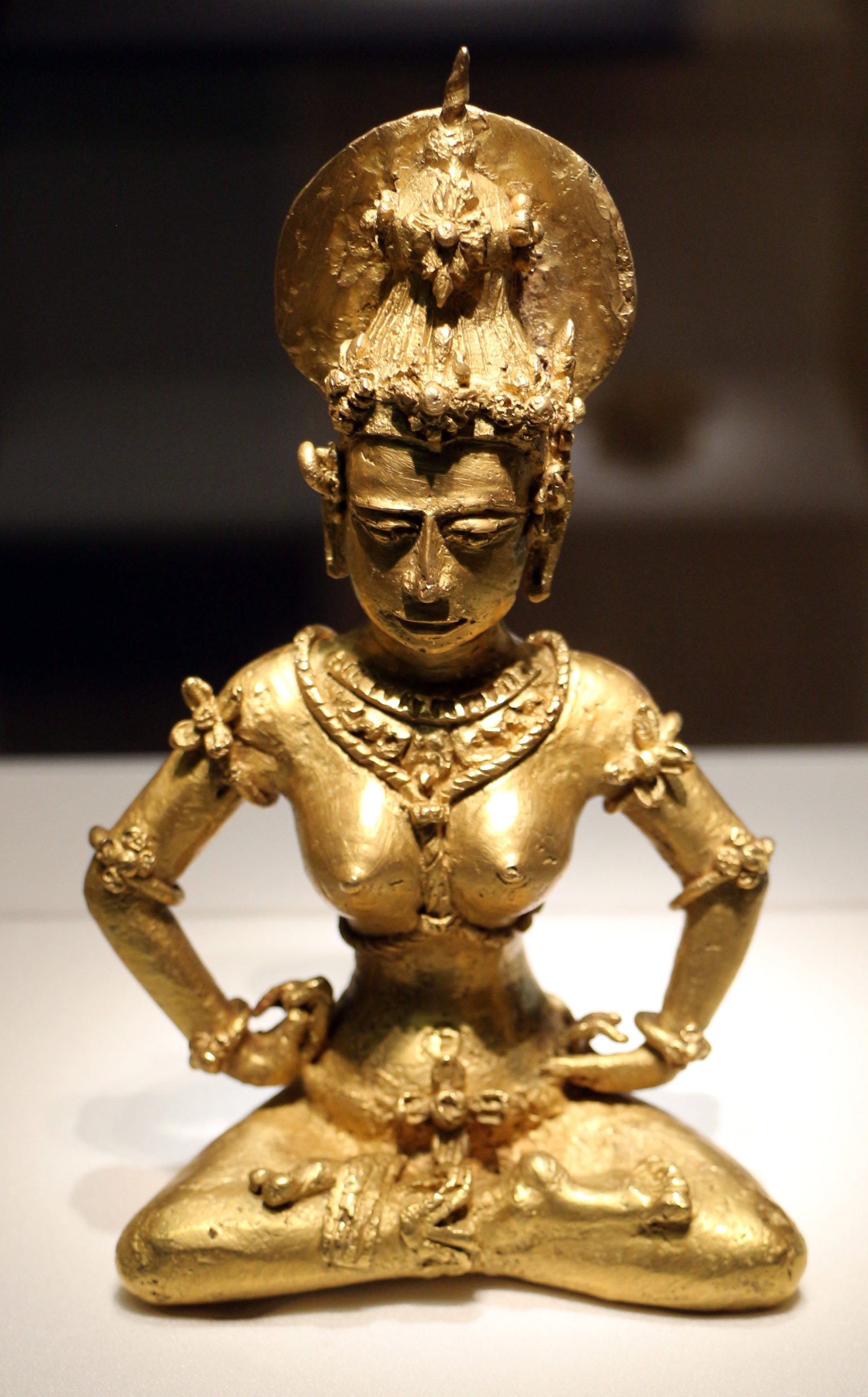
- The Agusan image, 2016
- Material: gold, copper and silver
- Height: 178 mm (7.0 in)
- Weight: 2 kg (4.4 lb)
- Created: 9th–10th Centuries AD
- Discovered: 1917; Esperanza, Agusan del Sur, Mindanao, Philippines
- Present location: Field Museum of Natural History
- Culture: Indigenous Philippine folk religions, Hinduism, Buddhism (disputed in regards to Hindu & Buddhist identity)

The Agusan image (commonly referred to in the Philippines as the Golden Tara due to its earliest and most-common association with, but disputed, identity as an image of a Buddhist Tara) is a 2 kg (4.4 lb), 21-karat gold statuette found in 1917 on the banks of the Wawa River near Esperanza, Agusan del Sur, Mindanao in the Philippines. It is dated to the 9th–10th centuries. The figure, approximately 178 mm (7.0 in) in height, is of a female Hindu or Buddhist deity, seated cross-legged and wearing a richly-adorned headdress and other ornaments on various parts of the body. It is now on display in the Field Museum of Natural History in Chicago.

Since its discovery, the identity of the goddess represented by the gold statuette has been the subject of debate. Proposed identities of the gold figurine range from that of a Hindu Sivaite goddess to a Buddhist Tara. Recent scholarship suggests that the image represents the offering goddess Vajralāsyā of the Tantric Buddhist tradition.

== Identity ==
H. Otley Beyer believed that the image was that of a Hindu Shaivite goddess, but with the religiously important hand gestures improperly copied by local craftsmen. If true, this suggests Hinduism was already in the Philippines before Ferdinand Magellan arrived, with early Filipinos adopting an imperfect version of Hinduism from the Majapahit Empire. Natives would not convert into Hinduism, rather, they absorbed its traditions while retaining their own indigenous Anitist religions. This golden Agusan image seems to be modelled after — or copied — Nganjuk bronze images of early Majapahit period.

A study of this image was made by F. D. K. Bosch, of Batavia, in 1920, who came to the conclusion that it was made by local workmen in Mindanao, copying a Nganjuk image of the early Majapahit period — except that the local artist overlooked the distinguishing attributes held in the hand. It probably had some connection with the Javanese miners who are known to have been mining gold in the Agusan-Surigao area in the middle or late 14th century. The image is apparently that of a Sivaite goddess, and fits in well with the name "Butuan" (signifying "phallus").

— H. Otley Beyer, 1947

Juan R. Francisco however questioned Beyer’s identification of the golden image in that: (1) "Butuan" means "phallus" (the origin is still under discussion); (2) that the King of Butuan, not being a Muslim, should therefore be a Hindu of the Shaivite persuasion; (3) that the existence of other Shaivite images discovered among the Mandaya (south of where the Agusan image was discovered) and in Cebu should support his conclusions regarding the female Shaivite goddess identity of the golden statuette. Regarding the last assumption, Francisco pointed out that the identity of the other supposedly "Sivaite" images mentioned by Beyer (all of which were destroyed by the fire that consumed the Ateneo de Manila Museum in the early 1930s) is also questionable, since John Carroll, who examined a photograph of the Cebu image, believed that it is an "Avalokitesvara, not a Siva". Francisco, on the basis of the re-study of the gold statue, believed that it represents a Buddhist Tara.

It seems likely that the image is a goddess of the Buddhist pantheon, in the Mahayana group. Its related to the concept of a female Boddhisattva, and at the same time the counterpart of the Hindu goddess (Sakti), as a Tara (or wife of a Buddhist god), which is a peculiar development of Buddhism in Southeast Asia.

— Juan R. Francisco, "A Note on the Golden Image of Agusan" (1963)

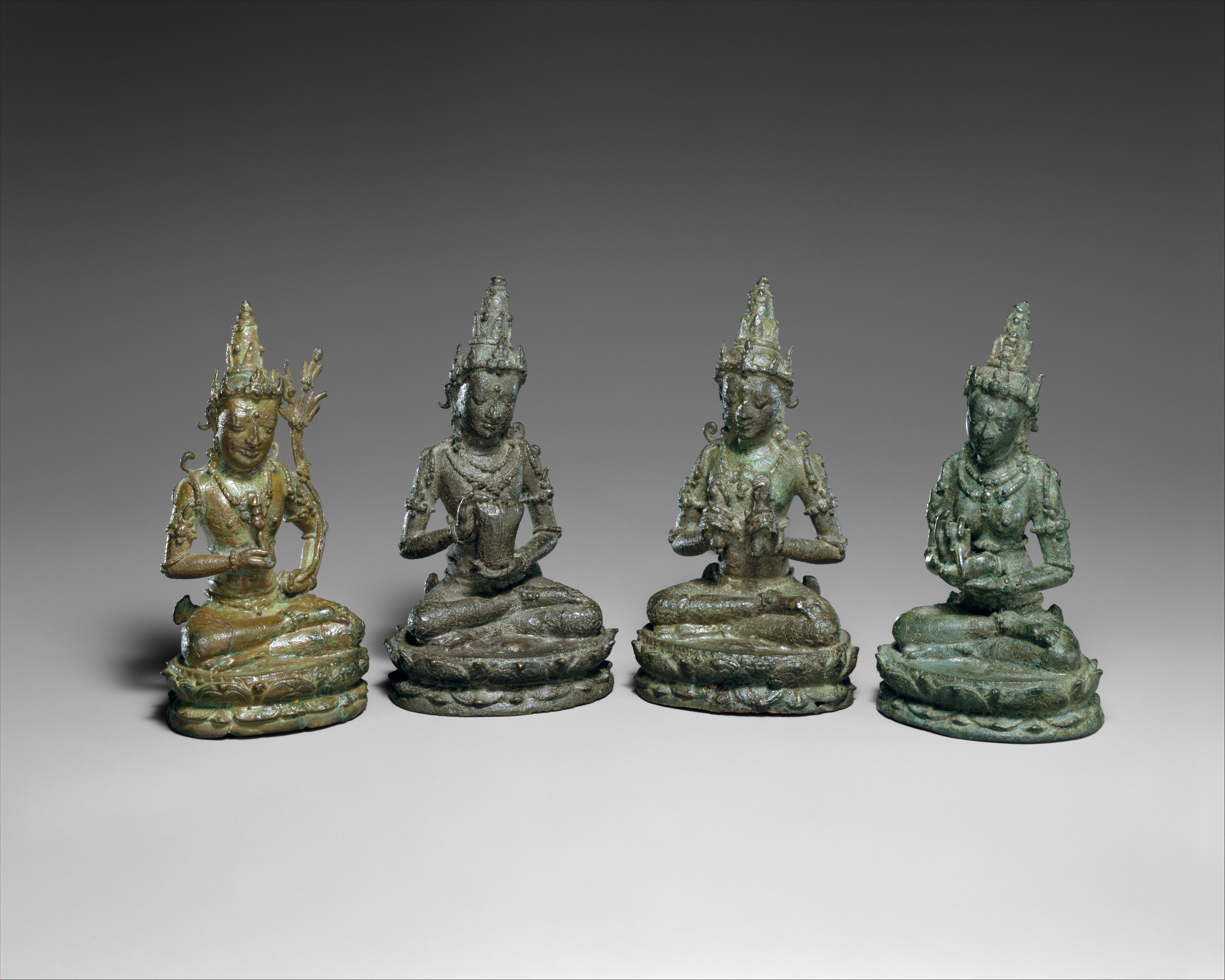
Four bronze deities from a Vajradhātu Mandala and unearthed in Nganjuk, Java. These figurines share stylistic similarities with the Agusan image.

Another proposed identity of the Agusan image is the offering goddess Vajralāsyā, one four female deities located in the inner circle of a mandala called the Diamond Realm (Vajradhātu). Mandalas like the Diamond Realm Mandala in Tantric Buddhism are elaborate diagrams that represent the cosmos in a metaphorical or symbolic manner. Mandalas can be represented as two-dimensional (either temporarily drawn on flat surfaces, painted on cloth, or etched on metal plates), as three-dimensional sculptural tableaux, and large architectural constructions likeBorobudur in Central Java. Three-dimensional mandalas are thought to have been used for sacred rituals involving the offering of water, flowers, incense, lamps, unguents, etc.

The Diamond Realm Mandala is one of the well-known and well-documented of early Buddhist mandalas. Located at the center of such mandala is the Buddha Vairocana, surrounded by an inner circle of deities. The four cosmic Buddhas occupy the four cardinal points of the inner circle, each of which is surrounded by four attendants, while the four offering goddesses sit at the inner circle's four corners. The four inner goddesses associated with offerings made to the Buddha Vairocana are Vajralāsyā ("amorous dance", at the southeast corner); Vajramālā ("garland", at the southwest); Vajragītā ("song", at the northwest); and Vajramṛtyā ("dance", at the northeast). In the outer circle are sixteen more deities, four arranged along each of the four cardinal directions, while at the interstitial corners are four more "outer" offering goddesses. The outer circle is surrounded by 1,000 more buddhas and 24 deities who guard the boundaries, while four guardian deities protect the four portals at the four cardinal directions.

The Tibetan scholar Rob Linrothe was one of the first to identify the Agusan image as Vajralāsyā, who is always shown with her hands on her hips. Florina Capistrano-Baker agrees with this conclusion, noting the similarities in style between the Agusan golden image and the other statuettes belonging to a three-dimensional Diamond Realm Mandala set such as the four bronze deities discovered in Nganjuk, Java (believed to represent the four outer offering goddesses). The shared characteristics between the Nganjuk figurines and the Agusan golden image were already suggested back then in 1920 by the Dutch scholar F. D. K. Bosch; however, it was ignored at that time because no illustrations of the bronze figurines were presented. Recent scholarship is now re-evaluating the relationship between the Agusan golden image and the Nganjuk bronze deities as these are believed to have been made around the same time (10th–11th centuries). Identification of the gold figurine with the offering goddess Vajralāsyā also implies that it is part of a larger set of offering deities associated with the Diamond Realm mandala, the whereabouts of which remains unknown and is most likely lost.

Although study of the relationship between the Agusan Vajralasya and the Nganjuk offering goddesses has been overlooked, it is clear that the Agusan image belongs to the same genre.

— Florina H. Capistrano-Baker, "Butuan in Early Southeast Asia", Philippine Ancestral Gold (2011)

One of the factors that makes the identification of the image by scholars difficult is the fact that it has no specific iconographic attributes. The goldsmiths in the Philippines knew of Hindu and Buddhist artistic conventions, but did not include motifs to identify them as specific deities. Philippine goldsmiths may have done this intentionally to maintain their ethnic identity.

== History ==
In 1917, the Agusan image was found by a Manobo woman along the banks of the Wawa River near Esperanza, Agusan del Sur. She kept the artifact as a manika (doll) until it was acquired by the then Agusan Deputy Governor Blas Baklagon, after which it gained the name Buwawan ni Baklagon (Gold of Baklagon). However, according to Constancia Guiral, her grandmother Belay Campos had found the image and kept it as a manika (doll), placing it on an altar for worship until it was stolen from their traditional Manobo house. It then ended up in the hands of Blas Baklagon.

In 1918, Baklagon brought the artefact to the attention of Dr. H. Otley Beyer, who called it "the most spectacular single find yet made in Philippine archeology". Beyer, who was then the chair of the Department of Anthropology at the University of the Philippines and thus an honorary curator of the National Museum of the Philippines, attempted to convince the American colonial government in the Philippines to purchase the Agusan image for the National Museum of the Philippines in Manila. However, the government failed to purchase the artefact due to lack of funds.

Ownership next passed to the Agusan Coconut Company, to which Blas Baklagon owed a debt. News of its existence eventually reached important people such as Louise Wood, whose husband Leonard Wood was the American Governor-General in the Philippines. Fearing the image might be melted down for its value in gold, Mrs. Wood conducted a fundraising campaign for the purchase of the gold artifact. She enlisted the help of Fay-Cooper Cole, the curator of Chicago Field Museum's Southeast Asian department, together with Shaler Matthews, a professor at the University of Chicago. Their efforts paid off when the image was finally acquired for the museum in 1922 for ₱4,000.00.

In 1922, the image was shipped to the United States and was finally housed at the Field Museum of Natural History in Chicago, where it remains to this day. Since the 21st century, the site in Agusan where the image was found has become a pilgrimage site for Buddhists and animists alike.

== Reparation to Philippines ==
Filipinos have demanded reparation of the Agusan image from the United States to Philippines. The artifact has been a source of conflict between Filipinos and Americans for many years, and many Filipino scholars have demanded its return. It is seen as a national treasure of the country, unreported during the time of its discovery, and sold to Americans during a period of national financial difficulty leading to the inability of the Philippine government to purchase the artifact when it was auctioned. Scholars have argued that if the reason the Field Museum took the artifact was due to fear of it may have been melted down, then the museum should return it, or at least allow the Philippines to purchase back the artifact since the scenario that involves the image being melted down for its gold is now unlikely.

Also mentioned is how the artefact was bought by an American museum during a time when the Philippines was under financial duress and an American colony. One of the major advocates for the return of the Agusan image is former Senator Aquilino Pimentel Jr., who made his last privilege speech specifically supporting its repatriation to the Philippines. The Field Museum has stated that it may return the golden image if it is "strongly requested" by the Philippine government.

In April 2018, a documentary by GMA Network featured the Agusan image, this time showing the people of Agusan del Sur supporting the repatriation of the statue. Scholars in partnership with the government also found a document proving the Philippines' right to claim the artefact.

== See also ==
- Indian influences in early Philippine polities
  - Butuan silver paleograph
  - Butuan ivory seal
  - Laguna Copperplate Inscription
  - Buddhism in the Philippines
  - Hinduism in the Philippines
  - Tabon Caves Garuda Gold Pendant
  - Laguna Copperplate Inscription
- History of the Philippines
  - Butuan (historical polity)
