= Filipinos in India =

- (Philippines) (India)

Total population
- 3,500

Regions with significant populations
- Chennai · Kochi · New Delhi · Mumbai · Hyderabad · Bangalore · Kolkata · Lucknow · Visakhapatnam · Indore · Amritsar · Ahmedabad

Languages
- English (Philippine and Indian) · Tagalog · Cebuano · Telugu · Kannada · Marathi · Gujarati · Punjabi · Tamil · Malayalam · Hindi · other languages of India

Religion
- Christianity · Roman Catholicism

Related ethnic groups
- Overseas Filipino

Filipinos living in India consists of migrants from the Philippines to India. As of March 2013, there are about 3,500 Filipinos living in the country. They form one of the largest expat minorities in India.

== Employment ==
Most Filipinos in India work in companies in the information technology industry. They would be managers, trainees on a limited schedule, or connected in key and sensitive positions. There are also others working in other industries such as engineering, hospitality as well as foreign or diplomatic relations.

There are smaller numbers of Filipinos also working as musicians, bands and singers working in the best nightspots in India as well as teachers in specific schools.

== Distribution ==
Many of them live in cities such as Chennai, New Delhi, Kochi and Mumbai. There are about 70 Filipinos living in Chennai, and they come together for early Christmas celebrations every year in Nandambakkam, where they celebrate in the traditional Filipino way. There is also a Filipino film festival in Chennai. The 10-day film festival is being jointly organised by the Madras Film Society, Embassy of the Philippines in New Delhi, and the International Cine-Appreciation Foundation (ICAF).

Mumbai is home to about 90 Filipino residents and most of them are married to Indian nationals. Many Filipinos who met their Malayali spouses while working in the Arab States of the Persian Gulf have settled in the state of Kerala.

== Notable people ==
- Juan R. Francisco - Filipino Indologist
- Josephine Acosta Pasricha - Filipino Indologist

== See also ==
- Indian Filipino
- India–Philippines relations
