= Nanak Darbar Indian Sikh Temple =

Gurdwara in Iloilo City, Philippines

Coordinates: 10°42′43″N 122°32′26″E

Nanak Darbar Indian Sikh Temple, Iloilo is an Indian Sikh temple in Mandurriao, Iloilo City, Philippines. It was part of creating a Guinness world record, for simultaneous candle lighting by 100,000 people for the world peace,

== Location ==
It is located close to the Old Iloilo Airport or Iloilo Business Park at 113 R. Mapa Street in the Mandurriao district of Iloilo City.

== Cultural significance and free meals for all ==
The temple serves the Indian community in Iloilo City. It also acts as a means of cultural integration by welcoming all and by providing free meals (called "langar") for all visitors which is available whenever the temple is open.

== Indian community in Iloilo ==
=== Focus on and the concentration of Indians ===
Philippines' Department of Tourism has identified India, the 12th biggest source of tourist arrival to Philippines, as a high value source nation to attract more tourists to Western Visayas, including Boracay and Iloilo.

The District of Mandurriao in Iloilo City, and Barangays Taculing and Bara in Bacolod are main area of concentration of Indians living in Panay. Several Indians are engaged in local micro-finance lending business (mostly Punjabis), mobile shops on bikes (mostly Punjabis), consumer goods (mostly Sindhis), pawan shops (mostly Sindhis), textiles (mostly Sindhis), electronic accessories (mostly Sindhis), MBBS students (mixed) and even in BPO and Outsourcing industry (mixed professionals) in Iloilo. In 2008, estimated population of Indians, both alien and naturalised Filipino citizens, was around 600 in Western Visayas, which is expected to be few thousand currently. Indian students also come to Iloilo Doctors' College to study Bachelor of Medicine, Bachelor of Surgery degree which also has the on-campus Indian canteen for these students. Diamond Shopping Centre and Sambo Bazar are prominent Indian businesses in Iloilo.

=== Mini India of Iloilo ===
Area around the SIkh temple in Iloilo is the "Mini India of Iloilo". A few Indian grocery stores located next to the temple sell groceries imported from India, which are bought by the local Indians and Indian restaurants as far as those in Boracay.

== See also ==
- Indian settlement in the Philippines
- Indian Ethnic group in the Philippines
- Hinduism in the Philippines
