= Lumbang, Myanmar =

Village in Chin State, Myanmar

Coordinates: 23°00′N 93°42′E

Lumbang (Lumbana) is a village in Falam Township, Falam District Chin State, Myanmar, 9.4 kilometres (5.8 mi) north of the town of Falam on the Tedim Road. Lumbang observes Myanmar Time with a UTC offset of 6.5 hours.
