= Josephine Acosta Pasricha =

Filipino indologist (1945–2020)

Josephine Acosta Pasricha (born 26 March 1945 – 6 June 2020) was a Filipino indologist who translated the "Ramacharitamanasa" of Tulasi Dasa, the Hindi translation of the Ramayana by Valmiki in Sanskrit, into the Filipino language.

== Biography ==
Pasricha was mentored by Filipino indologist Juan R. Francisco. She made a complete unpublished Filipino translation of the seven books of the "Ramacharitamanasa" of Tulasi Dasa, accompanied with contextual, intertextual and textual analysis, and cross-references with Sanskrit, Hindi and English translations.

An expert in the Ramayana and the Mahabharata, she was also a Ford Foundation research scholar to the University of Delhi. She taught humanities in the University of Santo Tomas in Manila, up until her death. In the undergraduate level, she taught Art Appreciation, Aesthetics and Hermeneutics. In the graduate level, she taught Advanced Aesthetics, Advanced Hermeneutics, Cultural Studies, Feminist Philosophy and Theology of the Body.

She was one of the editors of the Filipino translation of Kama Sutra by Marvin Reyes and Paz Panganiban. The translation is based on the work of Vatsyayana and Sir Richard Burton. Dr. Pasricha died on 6 June 2020 due to cardiac arrest.

== Personal life ==
Pasricha was married to an Indian man and had two daughters, Sarina and Satya (also known as Selene). Both daughters were raised in the Philippines and now work in India for a global Indian Informational Technology company.

== Works ==
=== Author ===
- The Theory of the Sublime in the Mahabharata
- Introduction to Art Appreciation, co-author with Manolita Policarpio and Inez Pascual
- Introduction to Art Appreciation and Aesthetics, co-author with Tomas Hernandez

=== Editor ===
- Kama Sutra, a Filipino translation

== See also ==
- Filipinos in India
- Indomania
- Indian Filipino
- List of India-related topics in the Philippines
