= Indian Filipino =

Filipinos of Indian descent

Indians in the Philippines, Indian Filipinos
Indyanong Pilipino/Indyanong Pinoy/Bumbay (colloquial)/Turko (Cebuano reference)

Total population
- 70,000

Regions with significant populations
- Metro Manila; Cainta; Cebu City; Davao City; Cagayan de Oro; Iloilo City; Bacolod

Languages
- Punjabi; Sindhi; Gujarati; Telugu; Tagalog; Hindustani; Cebuano; Hiligaynon; Ilocano; English; Various Indian languages

Religion
- Hinduism; Sikhism; Christianity (especially Catholic Christianity); Buddhism; Islam; Jainism

Indian Filipinos are Filipinos of Indian descent who have historical connections with and have established themselves in what is now the Philippines. The term refers to Filipino citizens of either pure or mixed Indian descent currently residing in the country, the latter a result of intermarriages between the Indians and local populations.

Indians in the Philippines have generally arrived in four waves since pre-colonial times: Indian merchants and traders who visited the Philippines regularly from India and Southeast Asia; slaves from South India and Bengal, who made up the majority of slaves imported into the Philippines by the Spanish in the 1500s and 1600s; Indian soldiers and sepoys who arrived in the Philippines and mutinied during the British occupation of the Manila in the 1760s, deserting and intermarrying with native Filipinos; and the fourth wave, continuing to the present of Indians who have immigrated to the Philippines since the 1890s for work, education, and business, with this number continuing to grow as relations between the Philippines and India continue.

The first census in the Philippines was in 1591, based on tributes collected. The tributes counted the total founding population of the Spanish-Philippines as 667,612 people. 20,000 were Chinese migrant traders, at different times: around 15,600 individuals were Latino soldier-colonists who were cumulatively sent from Peru and Mexico and they were shipped to the Philippines annually, 3,000 were Japanese residents, and 600 were pure Spaniards from Europe. There was a large but unknown number of South Asian Filipinos, as the majority of the slaves imported into the archipelago were from Bengal and Southern India, adding Dravidian speaking South Indians and Indo-European speaking Bengalis into the ethnic mix.

== History ==
=== Prehistory ===
Indian genetic signatures found among the Dilaut native ethnic group of the Sulu archipelago show that Indian immigration to the Philippines happened even before the start of formal written Philippine history.

=== Ancient history ===
Iron Age finds in Philippines also point to the existence of trade between the Indian Subcontinent and the Philippine Islands during the ninth and tenth centuries B.C. India had greatly influenced the many different cultures of the Philippines through the Indianized kingdom of the Hindu Majapahit and the Buddhist Srivijaya. For at least two millennia before the arrival of the Spanish, Philippines was ruled by Hindu kings called Rajahs and Pramukhas. Numerous kings with written genealogies and Sanskrit names were found by Spanish warlords and friars. Indian presence in the Philippines has been ongoing since ancient times along with the Japanese people and the Han Chinese and Arab and Persian traders, predating even the coming of the Europeans by at least two millennia. Indian people together with the natives of the Indonesian Archipelago and the Malay Peninsula, who came as traders introduced Hinduism to the natives of the Philippines. Indian migrants have been crucial in the establishment of several Indianized kingdoms ruled by 'rajahs' in the Philippines, such as that of Butuan and Cebu. Indian Bania converts to Islam brought Sunni Islam to the Philippine islands in the course of trade, which was later enhanced and strengthened by Arab Muslim sea traders to Mindanao and Sulu Sultanate.

The semi-legendary first Rajah and founder of Cebu, Sri Rajahmura Lumaya, whose existence is only confirmed through oral tradition in the Cebuano epic Aginid, Bayok sa atong Tawarik, was said to be of Tamil and Malay ancestry from Sumatra.

By the 17th century, Gujarati merchants with the aid of Khoja and Bohri ship-owners had developed an international transoceanic empire which had a network of agents stationed at the great port cities across the Indian Ocean. These networks extended to the Philippines in the east, East Africa in the west and via maritime and the inland caravan route to Russia in the north.

=== Colonial Period ===
Indian Filipinos on the Velarde map, 1754

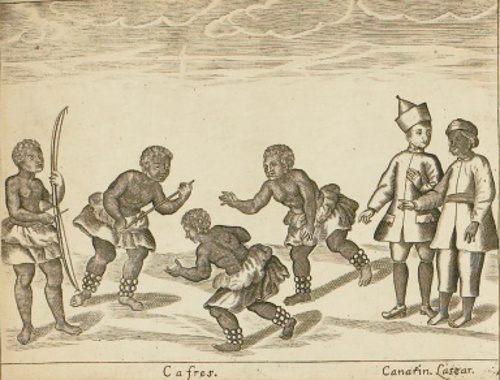
A "Canarin" (Konkani) and a Lascar, right side

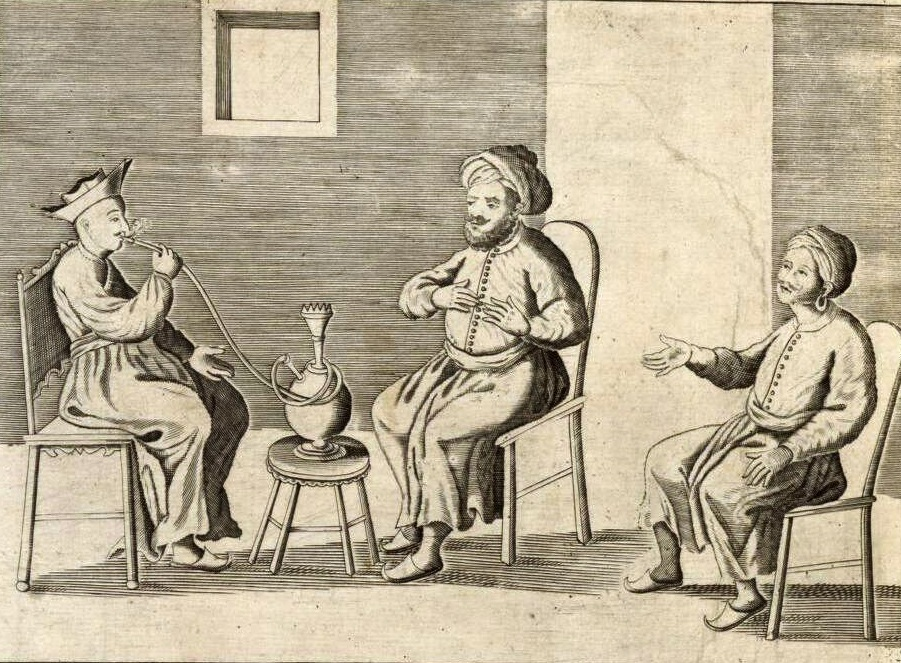
A Mughal and a "Malabar", right side

During the Spanish era, the chief source of slaves bought by Spanish administrators, native Filipino nobilities, and Chinese merchants in the Philippines, were: India and Bengal. Together they formed a cosmopolitan community in even the rural areas of the country. Sepoy troops from Madras (now Chennai, Tamil Nadu), British India also arrived with the British expedition and occupation between 1762 and 1764 during the Seven Years' War. When the British withdrew, many of the sepoys mutinied and refused to leave. Virtually all had taken native brides (or soon did so). They settled in what is Cainta, in what was then the Province of Manila (currently part of Rizal Province). As of 2006, between 70 and 75 percent of Indians in the Philippines lived in Metro Manila, with the largest community outside of Manila being in Isabela province. The region in and around Cainta still has many Sepoy descendants.

However, Indian business people started to arrive in larger numbers in The Philippines during the American colonial period (1898–1930s) – especially during the 1930s and 1940s, when many Indians and Indian Filipinos lived in Filipino provinces, including Davao. The longest serving mayor of Manila, Ramon Bagatsing, was of Indian-Punjabi descent, having moved to Manila from Fabrica, Negros Occidental before the Second World War.

A second surge of Indian businessmen, especially Sindhis arrived in Philippines during the Partition of India.

=== Present ===
Most of the Indians and Indian Filipinos in the Philippines are Sindhi and Punjabi as well as a large Tamil population. Many are fluent in Tagalog and English as well as local languages of the provinces and islands. Many are prosperous middle class with their main occupations in clothing sales and marketing. Sikhs are involved largely in finance, money lending (locally called Five – six), sales and marketing.

Over the last three decades, a large number of civil servants and highly educated Indians working in large banks, Asian Development Bank and the BPO sector have migrated to Philippines, especially Manila. Most of the Indian Filipinos and Indian expatriates are Hindu, Sikh, Christians or Muslims, but have assimilated into Filipino culture. The community regularly conducts philanthropic activities through bodies such as the Mahaveer foundation, The SEVA foundation and the Sathya Sai organization.

Most Indians congregate for socio-cultural and religious activities at the Hindu Temple (Mahatma Gandhi Street, Paco, Manila), the Indian Sikh Temple (United Nations Avenue, Paco, Manila), and the Radha Soami Satsang Beas center (Alabang, Muntinlupa, Metro Manila).

Many Indians have intermarried with Filipinos, more so than in neighboring countries such as Indonesia, Malaysia, and Singapore, mainly because their populations are largely Muslim, and the Indians there (with the exception of Indian-Muslims) are averse to marrying Muslims in those host countries.

Indian Filipino companies with the largest work force include Indo Phil Textile (1,800 employees), Global Steel (950 employees and 8,000 in Iligan), Hinduja Global (3,500 workers) and Aegis People Support (over 12,000).

== Demography and DNA studies ==
The Indian Mitochondrial DNA hapolgroups, M52'58 and M52a are also present in the Philippines suggesting that there was Indian migration to the archipelago starting from the 5th Century AD.

The integration of Southeast Asia into Indian Ocean trading networks around 2,000 years ago also shows some impact, with South Asian genetic signals present within some Filipino ethnic groups like the Sama-Bajau communities.

== Filipino people of Indian descent ==
=== Beauty pageant winners ===
- Rabiya Occeña Mateo, winner of Miss Universe Philippines 2020.
- Parul Quitola Shah, Miss Grand International 2015 – 2nd Runner-up.
- Maria Venus Bayonito Raj, winner of Binibining Pilipinas 2010, Miss Universe 2010 Fourth Runner-up.

=== Movies & TV ===
- Addy Raj, actor
- Aljur Abrenica, actor, dancer, model and singer
- Vin Abrenica, actor, model, singer
- Raymond Bagatsing, actor, model
- RK Bagatsing, actor
- Joem Bascon, actor
- Gian Magdangal, singer and actor
- Cassandra Ponti, Filipina-Indian actress, model and dancer
- Sharmaine Arnaiz, Filipina-Indian actress
- Rene Requiestas, actor and comedian

=== Radio ===
- Sam Y.G., Filipino-Indian radio disc jockey
- Mo Twister, Filipino-Indian DJ, actor, host and podcaster

=== Author ===
- Roshani Chokshi, Filipino-Indian descent, American author

=== Politics ===
- Ramon Bagatsing, Filipino-Indian of Punjabi Jat blood, longest serving mayor of Manila, grandfather of Raymond Bagatsing
- Ranjit Shahani, Filipino-Indian politician congressman and former youngest vice governor in the country of Pangasinan province at the age of 28, from Indian father Dr. Ranjee Gurdassing Shahani, PhD and former senator Dr. Leticia Ramos-Shahani, PhD who is the sister of former president of Philippines Fidel Ramos

=== Sports ===
- Von Pessumal, Filipino professional basketball player
- Carlo Sharma, Filipino professional basketball player
- Khasim Mirza, Filipino professional basketball player
- Hyram Bagatsing, Filipino professional basketball player
- Sanjay Beach, American football player

=== Army and Revolution ===
- Juan Cailles, commander who served during the Philippine Revolution and Philippine–American War

== See also ==
- List of India-related topics in the Philippines
- Hinduism in the Philippines
- Filipinos in India
- India–Philippines relations
- Nanak Darbar Indian Sikh Temple, Iloilo
