= Maharadia Lawana =

Maranao epic story

The Maharadia Lawana (sometimes spelled Maharadya Lawana or Maharaja Rāvaṇa) is a Maranao epic poem which is a local retelling of the Indian epic Ramayana. Its English translation is attributed to Filipino Indologist Juan R. Francisco, assisted by Maranao scholar Nagasura Madale, based on Francisco's ethnographic research in the Lake Lanao area in the late 1960s.

It narrates the adventures of the monkey-king, Maharadia Lawana, to whom the gods have granted immortality.

Francisco first heard the poem being sung by Maranao bards around Lake Lanao in 1968. He then sought the help of Maranao scholar Nagasura Madale, resulting in a rhyming English translation of the epic.

Francisco believed that the Ramayana narrative arrived in the Philippines some time between the 17th to 19th centuries, via interactions with Javanese and Malay cultures which traded extensively with India.

By the time it was documented in the 1960s, the character names, place names, and the precise episodes and events in the Maharadia Lawana narrative already had some notable differences from those of the Ramayana. Francisco believed that this was a sign of "indigenization", and suggested that some changes had already been introduced to the Malay Peninsula and Java before the story was transmitted to the Maranao, and that upon reaching their homeland, the story was "further indigenized to suit Philippine cultural perspectives and orientations."

== List of characters and places ==
- Maharadiya Lawana - Ravana, a destructive king with seven heads. The son of the Sultan and Sultana of Polo Bandiyarmasir.
- Polo Bandiyarmasir - Lanka, the island kingdom of Ravana.
- Polo Nagara - Mount Kailash, an island where Maharadiya Lawana cut off his own heads as a sacrifice.
- Agama Niyog - Ayodhya
- Radiya Mangandiri and Radiya Mangawarna - Rama and Lakshmana, two brother princes.
- Towan Potri Malano Tihaya (also called Potri Malayla Ganding) - Sita, princess of Polo Nabanday.
- Ba’i or Sultan of Polo Nabanday - the ruler of Polo Nabanday. Roughly equivalent to Janaka.
- Polo Nabanday - the kingdoms where Potri Malayla Ganding lived. Roughly equivalent to Videha.
- Kabayan - an elderly woman living by the sea. She took in Radiya Mangandiri and Radiya Mangawarna.
- Imam
- Laksamana - a monkey who helped the two brothers. Roughly equivalent to Hanuman.
- Potri Langawi - the mother of the monkey Laksamana.

== See also ==
- Darangen
- Ramayana
- Maranao people
- Juan R. Francisco
