= Cebu (historical polity) =

Visayan historical polity in the Philippines

Cebu Sugbu
- Mid-15th century–1565
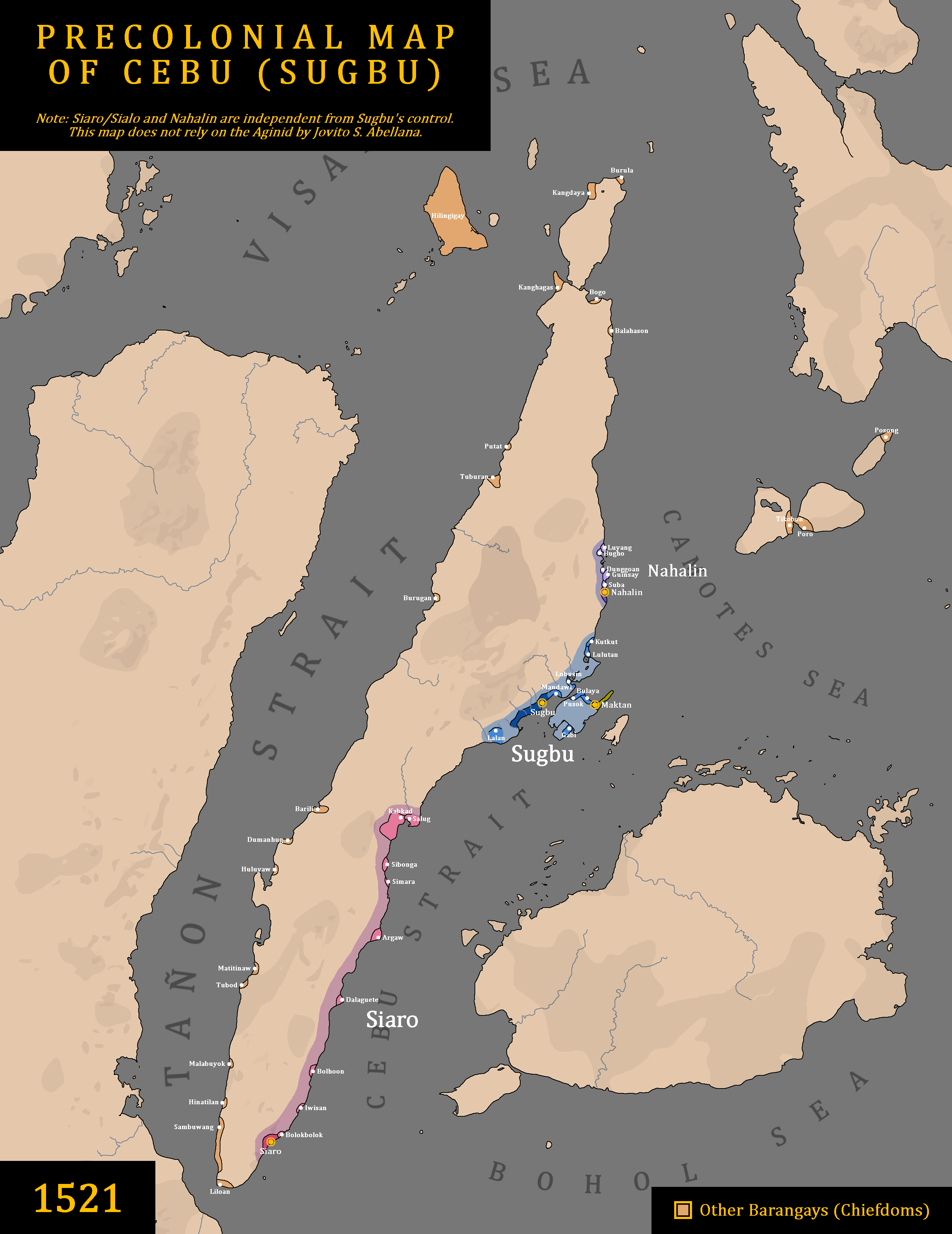
- Map of old Cebu in 1521, with Sugbu under Rajah Humabon colored as dark blue, and its subordinate barangays as lighter blue. Mactan under Si Lapulapu is colored yellow green.
- Capital: Singhapala (Modern Mabolo district in Cebu City)
- Common languages: Old Cebuano, Old Malay, Middle Tamil
- Religion: Syncretic form of Hinduism, Buddhism and Animism (see also Polytheism); Roman Catholicism (since 1521)
- Government: Absolute Monarchy
- Rajah
  - 1521: Rajah Humabon
  - 1521–1565: Rajah Tupas (last)
- History
  - Established: Mid-15th century
  - Disestablished: 4 June 1565
- Currency: Barter
Succeeded by
Captaincy General of the Philippines; Cebu (province)
- Today part of: Philippines

Cebu, also called Sugbu, informally referred to as the Rajahnate of Cebu, was an Indianized mandala (polity) monarchy on the island of Cebu in the Philippines prior to the arrival of the Spanish conquistadors. It is known in ancient Chinese records as the nation of Sokbu (束務) (Hokkien) or Suwu (Mandarin). According to Visayan oral legend, it was founded by Sri Lumay or Rajamuda Lumaya, a half-Malay and half-Tamil from Sumatra.

== History ==
=== Foundation ===
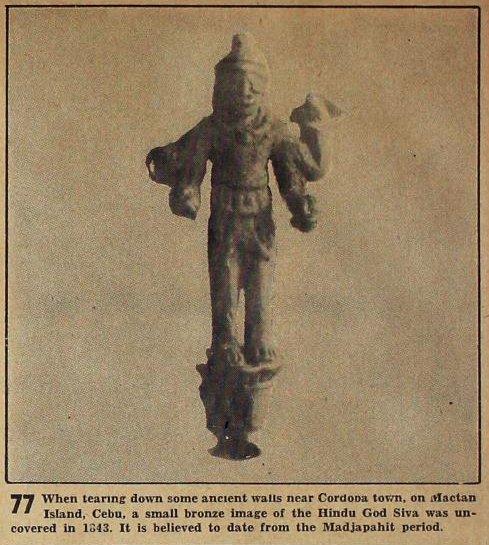
A picture of a bronze image of the Hindu god Shiva (lost during World War II), found at Mactan-Cebu. It shows how the culture of the area was Hindu and Indianized.

A kingdom called Suwu was mentioned in the 1225 Chinese Annals, the Zhufan Zhi (諸蕃志), and during the 17th Century this was the same name used for Cebu among Chinese traders to the Philippines thus it is presumed to be the same location.

This kingdom was mentioned in association with Boni (Brunei) wherein it was written:

The countries of Xilonggong (Sailunggung/Sailengkeng, possibly Selingaan Island ), Shimiao (Simmiu/Simbio), Rili (Jatlai/Jitleh, possibly Jelai ), Hulumantou (Wulomantau/Holobantau), Suwu (Somat/Sobut), Lima (Leima/Libeh), Danyu (Damjyu/Tamu), and Manuo (Manok/Belok) are located on islands in the sea. Their people travel to and fro in small boats, and their clothing and diet are the same as those of Boni. They produce sheng agarwood, lakawood, beeswax, and tortoiseshell. Merchants can trade for these with white porcelain ware, wine, rice, coarse salt, white spun silk, and trade-quality gold.

— Zhao Rukuo

According to Visayan folklore, Sri Lumay was a half-Tamil and half-Malay from Sumatra who settled in the Visayas, and had several sons. One of his sons was Sri Alho, who ruled a land known as Sialo which included the present-day towns of Carcar and Santander in the southern region of Cebu. Sri Ukob ruled a polity known as Nahalin in the north, which included the present-day towns of Consolacion, Liloan, Compostela, Danao, Carmen and Bantayan. He died in battle, fighting with the Muslim Moro pirates known as magalos (literally "destroyers of peace") from Mindanao. The islands they were in were collectively known as Pulua Kang Dayang or Kangdaya (literally "[the islands] which belong to Daya").

Sri Lumay was noted for his strict policies in defending against Moro Muslim raiders and slavers from Mindanao. His use of scorched earth tactics to repel invaders gave rise to the name Kang Sri Lumayng Sugbu (literally "that of Sri Lumay's great fire") to the town, which was later shortened to Sugbu ("scorched earth").

=== Cebuano and Visayan raids ===
Among the Chinese, especially during the Ming era, the people of Cebu and the surrounding groups from nearby islands (including Butuan, Samar, Leyte, Negros, Panay, and Northern Mindanao) were grouped under the term of Visayans and are called Peshiye.

The areas known as Pisheye were probably located in lowland coastal regions with minimal agricultural activity, a description that Cebu fits well.

The Visayans were described to have invaded Eastern Taiwan and had raided Southern China, especially the city of Quanzhou, and towns of Shui'ao and Weito.

=== Civics and commerce ===
The port-kingdom of Cebu was founded as early as the 10th Century, early Spanish-era contact descriptions show that it was a long, lineal, sea-side port-kingdom stretching up to 8 kilometers composed of 300 houses and buildings and at its center was a King's (Rajah's) Palace where the Rajah lives and an open square or plaza, in front of it. It is noted that there were no large temples, but had many wooded oratories. The explorer Wang Dayuan at 1350 published in the Daoyi Zhilüe, Zhifu Zhai Congshu edition as well as the book Zhinan Zhengfa (“The True Art of Pointing South) which had maritime logs compiled from 1471-1588 show a maritime shipping lane from the Kingdom of Manila to the Rajahnate of Cebu.

Ming Dynasty Maritime Itinerary: Shuangkou (Manila) to Suwu (Cebu)
Seq.	Chinese Name	Transliteration	Modern Identification	Navigational Notes
1	雞嶼	Jiyu		
2	糧裏	Liangli		
3	豬朥尾	Zhulaowei	Calatagan, Batangas	
4	麻里驢	Malilü	Marinduque	
5	石仔港	Shizigang		
6	龍陌大山	Longmo Dashan	Romblon	
7	馬蘇未	Masuwei	Masbate	
8	白表仔	Baibiaozi	Bantayan	
9	竹篙嶼	Zhugaoyu	Bogo	
10	蘇武	Sūwǔ	Cebu (Sugbu)	The final destination; recorded as a major trading hub.

From Suwu (Cebu) to Shuangkou (Manila)
Seq.	Chinese Name	Transliteration	Modern Identification	Navigational Notes
10	蘇武	Sūwǔ	Cebu (Sugbu)	The origin point, the Cebu Rajahnate
2	竹篙嶼	Zhugaoyu	Bogo	
3	市武祿	Shiwulu		
4	對開班愛大山	Duikai Banai dashan	off Panay Island	
5	脚桶嶼	Jiaotongyu		
6	市武淵	Shiwuyuan	Sibuyan Island	
7	慰交頭	Weijiaotou		
8	竹嶼	Zhuyu		
9	荖降頭	Laojiangtou		
10	里呂大山	Lilüdashan		
11	五虎下山	Wuhuxiashan		
12	海蹈大山	Haidaodashan		
13	外交武樓	Waijiaowulou		
14	呂蓬外山	Lüpeng waishan	Lubang Island	
15	現平坪	Xianpingshan		
166	覆鼎山	Fudengshan		

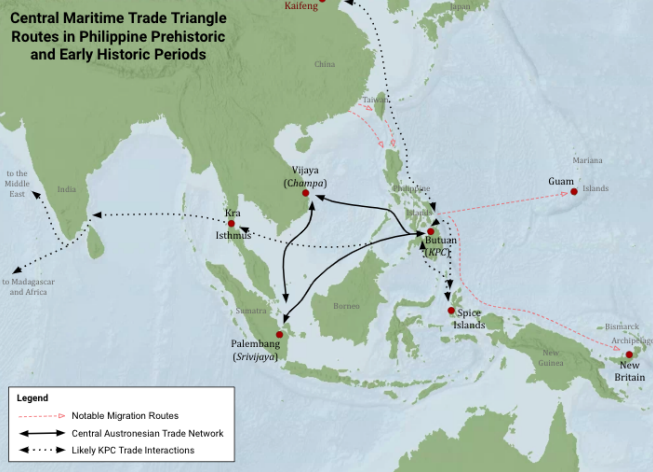
The KPC (Kalaga Putuan Crescent) Visayan trade-alliance or Rajamandala, which was an Entrepôt of: spices from Ternate, silk from China, Sandalwood incense from East Timor, Gold from Caraga, Shipping from Indochina, and Camphor from Brunei, peaked in the 1000s, and was led by the Rajahnate of Butuan, but was soon eclipsed by fellow Visayan kingdoms Sulu and Cebu, of which Cebu became the lead by dynastically marrying into the Rajahnate of Butuan's clan. And furthermore, according findings from the University of Australia, the Piseheye of Taiwan, Visayans of the Philippines, Bisaya of Borneo, the Sri Vijayans of Sumatra-Malacca, and Vijaya Mandala in Champa-Central Vietnam, were also connected in a transoceanic maritime thalassocracy.

Upon arrival in the Precolonial Rajahnate of Cebu or the Kingdom of Suwu among the Chinese, they traded in the products, the industries of Cebu had specialized in, mainly: Seaweed, Iron Smithing, Terraced Rice, and Native Cotton. Cebu was thus a polity characterized by a population largely made up of mixed ethnicities, and native merchants exchanged local and inter-archipelagic goods with traders from Java, Sumatra, Ayutthaya and China.

=== Reign of Sri Bantug ===
Sri Lumay was succeeded by the youngest of his sons, Sri Bantug, who ruled from a region known as Singhapala, which is now Mabolo of Cebu City. He died of disease. Sri Bantug had a brother called Sri Parang who was originally slated to succeed Sri Bantug. But he was a cripple and could not govern his polity because of his infirmity. Parang handed his throne to Sri Bantug's son and his nephew, Sri Humabon (also spelled Sri Hamabar), who became the rajah of Cebu in his stead.

=== Reign of Rajah Humabon ===
During Rajah Humabon's reign, the region had since become an important trading center where agricultural products were bartered. From Japan, perfume and glass utensils were usually traded for native goods. Ivory products, leather, precious and semi-precious stones and śarkarā (sugar) mostly came from India and Burma traders. The harbors of Sugbu (the modern-day Parián district of Cebu) became known colloquially as sinibuayang hingpit ("the place for trading"), shortened to sibu or sibo ("to trade"), from which the modern Castilian name "Cebú" originates. It was also during Humabon's reign that Lapulapu arrived from Borneo, and was granted by Humabon the region of Mandawili (now Mandaue), including the island known as Opong or Opon (later known as Mactan). First contact with the Spanish also occurred during Humabon's reign, resulting in the death of Ferdinand Magellan.

The phrase Kota Raya Kita was documented by historian Antonio Pigafetta, to be a warning in the Old Malay language, from a merchant to the rajah and was cited to have meant:

Have good care, O king, what you do, for these men are those who have conquered Calicut, Malacca, and all India the Greater. If you give them good reception and treat them well, it will be well for you, but if you treat them ill, so much the worse it will be for you, as they have done at Calicut and at Malacca.

In reality, this phrase is that of Kota Raya kita, an indigenous Malay phrase of merchants under the authority of Rajah Humabon, with a meaning in English of: "our capital city": Kota (fortress), Raya (great, hence Kotaraya (capital city)), kita (we).

==== Diplomacy with other Southeast Asian kingdoms ====
Cebu had diplomatic recognition among the other kingdoms of Southeast Asia. When Ferdinand Magellan's expedition landed on the port-kingdom of Cebu; the expedition scribe noted that not long before, an embassy carried by a ship from Siam (Thailand) arrived at Cebu and paid tribute to Rajah Humabon.

==== Dependencies of Cebu ====
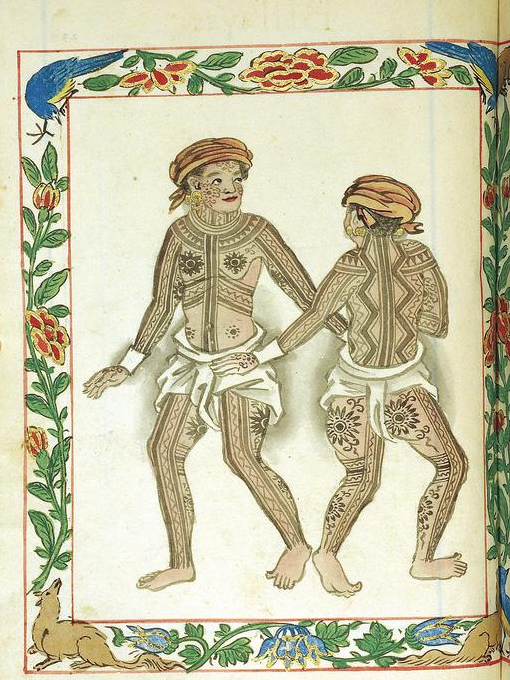
A picture from the Boxer Codex showing Cebuano men's war-tattoos, marks of honor, as the Pintados only tattoo themselves after victories in battle. This connects them to the dragon-people of China, the Baiyue, famous for their maritime and warrior ethos, plus serpent and dragon tattoos motif.

Antonio Pigafetta, the expedition scribe, enumerated the towns and dependencies Cebu had.

In this island of Zubu there are dogs and cats, and other animals, whose flesh is eaten; there is also rice, millet, panicum, and maize; there are also figs, oranges, lemons, sugar-canes, cocos, gourds, ginger, honey, and other such things; they also make palm-wine of many qualities. Gold is abundant. The island is large, and has a good port with two entrances: one to the west, and the other to the east-north-east. It is in ten degrees north latitude and 154 east longitude from the line of demarcation.

In this island there are several towns, each of which has its principal men or chiefs. Here are the names of the towns and their chiefs:—

Cingapola: its chiefs are Cilaton, Ciguibucan, Cimaninga, Cimaticat, Cicanbul.

Mandani: its chief is Aponoaan.

Lalan: its chief is Teten.

Lalutan: its chief is Japau.

Lubucin: its chief is Cilumai.

— Antonio Pigafetta

It is notable how the Spanish mispronounced the Tamil "Singhapala" (சிங்கப்பூர்) as "Cingapola".

==== Battle of Mactan ====
The Battle of Mactan was fought on 27 April 1521 between forces of Rajah Humabon which included the Portuguese explorer Ferdinand Magellan and Lapulapu, which resulted in the death of the former himself.

=== Reign of Rajah Tupas and the Legazpi Expedition ===
Map of the Chola empire after Rajendra I's Southeast Asian campaign, Sumatra island, which became a Chola colony, was where Rajamuda Lumaya the half Malay and half Tamil founder, of the Rajahnate of Cebu, was from.

Sri Parang, the limp, also had a young son, Sri Tupas, also known as Rajah Tupas who succeeded Rajah Humabon as king of Cebu. There is linguistic evidence that Cebu tried to preserve its Indian-Malay roots as time wore on since Antonio Pigafetta the scribe of Magellan described Rajah Tupas' father, the brother of Rajah Humabon as a "Bendara" which means "Treasurer" or "Vizier" in Sanskritized Malay and is a shortening of the word "Bendahara" (भाण्डार) which means "Storage house" in Sanskrit. The Hindu polity was dissolved during the reign of Rajah Tupas by the forces of conquistador Miguel López de Legazpi in the battle of Cebu during 1565.

=== Relations with other kingdoms ===
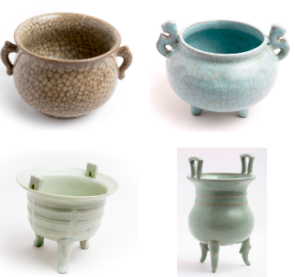
Varying expensive ceramics sourced from China, Thailand, and Indonesia, showing how among Philippine kingdoms, Cebu was a recipient of much foreign trade.

The rajahs of Cebu were relatives to the rajahs of Butuan. (Note: The book Aginid recounts the beginning of Cebu as having been founded by Bataugong and Balintawak, supposedly Humabon's great-grandparents. The book further narrates how the descendants of this couple founded their own chiefdoms and the narrative shows that the rulers of Butuan, for instance, were relatives of Humabon.) Thus the monarchies of Cebu and Butuan had relations with each other, as evidenced by the fact that Rajah Colambu of Butuan gave guidance to the Magellan expedition to reach the island of Cebu. The rajahs of Butuan were descendants of Rajah Kiling, who according to Researcher Eric Casino, were not Visayan in origin but rather, Indian, because Kiling refers to the people of India. The Sejarah Melayu (Malay Annals) of the nearby country of Malaysia, point to the similarly worded Keling as the immigrant people from India to Southeast Asia.

However, Cebu was not at peace with all kingdoms. Maynila, which was under the influence of Brunei and would later become the city of Manila had an arrogant attitude against Cebuanos and Visayans as the rajah of Maynila who had an Islamic name, Rajah Sulayman, ridiculed the Visayans that came and assisted the Legazpi expedition (which also included the Cebuanos) as an easily conquerable people. Fernao Mendes Pinto, among the earlier Portuguese colonists of Southeast Asia, pointed out that there were Muslims and non-Muslims among the inhabitants of the Philippines who fought each other.

=== Legacy ===
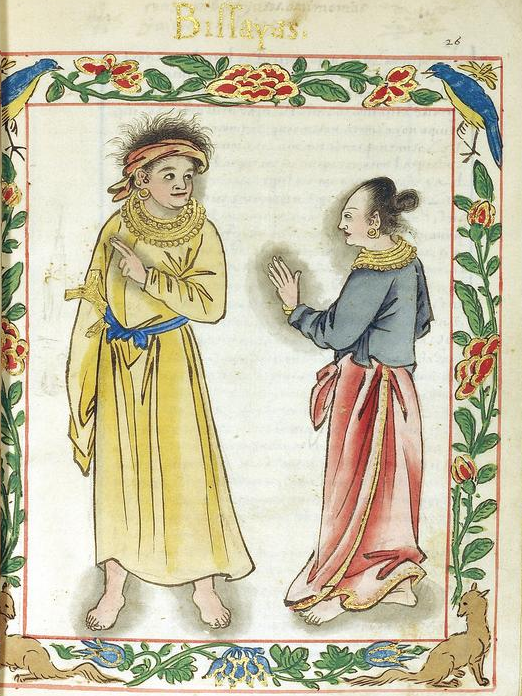
A Visayan royal couple donning gold jewelry similar to the attire Antonio Pigafetta described Rajah Humabon had donned in the Magellan landing on the Cebu Rajahnate.

Indianization, although it was superseded by Hispanization, left markers in the Cebuano language and culture, such as religious practices and common vocabulary words whose origins are from Sanskrit and Tamil. There is also genetic evidence of South Asian or Indian Hindu influence in Cebu as according to genetic studies, the people of Cebu and Bohol have as much as 10-20% of their genetics taken from South Asian admixture.

== Social hierarchy ==
Below the rulers were the Timawa, the feudal warrior class of the ancient Visayan societies of the Philippines who were regarded as higher than the uripon (commoners, serfs, and slaves) but below the tumao (royal nobility) in the social hierarchy. They were roughly similar to the Tagalog Maharlika class.

== Hindu-Buddhist artifacts ==
In 1921, Henry Otley Beyer found a crude Buddhist medallion and a copper statue of a Hindu deity, Ganesha, in ancient sites in Puerto Princesa, Palawan and in Mactan, Cebu. The crudeness of the artifacts indicates they were of local reproduction. The icons were destroyed during World War II. However, black and white photographs of these icons survive.

== Modern name usage ==
There have been proposals to rename the current Central Visayas region, which is dominated by the Cebuano ethnic group, into Sugbu region, the former name of the region prior to Spanish colonization in the 16th century.

== See also ==
Related to Cebu polity

- Singhapala – the ancient capital of the polity of Cebu.
- Battle of Mactan
- Lapulapu
- Timawa

Other related

- List of India-related topics in the Philippines
- Hinduism in the Philippines
- History of the Philippines (Before 1521)
- Pintados

== Notes ==
- https://web.archive.org/web/20110721110617/http://www.nhi.gov.ph/downloads/mp0073.pdf
