= Juan R. Francisco =

Filipino Indologist

Juan R. Francisco is a Filipino Indologist who first published an English translation of the Maranao version of the Ramayana epic. He is also a professor at the University of the Philippines in Manila. For several years he served as the Executive Director of the Philippine-American Educational Foundation (PAEF), administering the Fulbright Program in the Philippines.

== Education ==
He has a Ph.D. in Sanskrit from the University of Madras, and he studied under Indologist Raghavan from Chennai. Francisco himself taught another Filipino Indologist, Josephine Acosta Pasricha.

== Works ==
- Indian Influences in the Philippines (1964)
- Maharadia Lawana (1969)
- Sanskrit in Philippine Language and Literature (1973)
- From Ayodhya to Pulu Agamaniog: Rama's Journey to the Philippines (1994)
