= History of Bulacan =

Bulacan is a province of the Philippines. It was established on 15 August 1578.

== Prehistory ==
The earliest archeological evidence human habitation in the Philippines archipelago is the 40,000-year-old Tabon Man of Palawan and the Angono Petroglyphs in Rizal. By 1000 B.C. the inhabitants of the Philippine archipelago had developed into four distinct kinds of peoples: tribal groups who depended on hunter-gathering and were concentrated in forests; warrior societies who practiced social ranking and ritualized warfare and roamed the plains; the petty plutocracy of the Ifugao Cordillera Highlanders, who occupied the mountain ranges of Luzon; and the harbor principalities of the estuarine civilizations that grew along rivers and seashores while participating in trans-island maritime trade.

Around 300–700 C.E. the seafaring peoples of the islands traveling in balangays began trading with the Indianized kingdoms of Maritime Southeast Asia and nearby East Asian principalities, adopting influences from Buddhism and Hinduism.

During the reign of the Tang emperors in the 10th century, Arab and Chinese traders began to come to Bulacan, with both Indian and Chinese influences intensifying in the 11th and 12th centuries. Bulacan had by this time became an entrepot and the Bulakeños expert seafarers.

They built and sailed various types of ships, river canoes and larger vessels to carry merchandise, with up to hundred rowers and 30 fighting men. They lived in houses made of wood, bamboo and palm leaf thatch, had a syllabary written on bark and bamboo, played music, wore silk doublets and loin clothes or flowing skirts and flimsy blouses and jewellery. They had devised a social scheme of nobles, freemen and serfs and buried their dead in formal graveyard (with grave furniture consisting of imported Chinese pottery) at least one example of which can still be seen in Bulacan today.

The history began when a settlement of fishermen lived along the coast of Manila Bay before the coming of the Spaniards. These settlers moved inland and begun farming as they discovered the interior was fertile and drained by the network of rivers and streams. The settlements flourished and grew into what is now known as the province of Bulacan.

The Laguna Copperplate Inscription or the LCI was discovered at the Lumbang River in Laguna in 1991 (and deciphered by Antoon Postma of Mangyan Heritage Center in Mindoro). Historians such as Zeus Salazar of the University of the Philippines, consider the date of the LCI AD 900 as the commencement of recorded Philippine history rather than 1521. The copperplate was written in Kavi, an ancient script related to baybayin, and contains the placename "Binoangan" (now a barangay of Obando), Pailah (now Sitio Paila in barangay San Lorenzo of Norzagaray as mentioned on the Laguna Copperplate Inscription which is the oldest written document of Philippines inscribed in Indianized script dates back to 900 CE)), and Puliran (first said to be somewhere in Laguna, but Postma announced that it was much near to be Pulilan of Bulacan), and a native chieftain named Bukah from which Gatbuka in Calumpit probably derives. All of these were now part of Bulacan.

== Etymology ==
It is believed that flowers bloomed in the region when the Spaniards came. Because of these sprawling green orchards, vegetables and profusely flowering plants, as well as attractive women, this land had come to be called Bulacan as sort of shortened term for "bulak-lakan" and/or a derivative of the word "bulak" (kapok or cotton) which abounded in the province before the Spaniards came, hence "bulakán" means "cotton field or plantation" or "kapok field".

Some historians disagree on where the name Bulacan came from: some say from the word burak, because the place was swampy and muddy (burak means "muck"), while others say from the word bulak, since the road to the capital town was once upon a time lined with rows of cotton trees. According to Bahay-saliksikan ng Bulacan (Center for Bulacan Studies)

Another point of disagreement is the year it became a province because of lack of the real cedula: Provincial Government of Bulacan thru then-Governor Josefina dela Cruz commissioned the Bulacan Center for Study to research the exact date but until now the research is still ongoing. But due to grey areas of due to the lack of document, it was officially declared by the Sangguniang Panlalawigan ng Bulacan in its administrative order in 2008. It was duly recognized to be that in 1578, upon the foundation of the Town of Bulakan (former capital) with the research conducted by the Bahay-saliksikan ng Bulacan in 2005, then its director Prof. Reynaldo S. Naguit agreed that it was founded in August 15, 1578 the Center for Bulacan Studies researchers found some documents mentioning Provincia de Bulacan in the years such as 1582 (Relacion delas Islas of Miguel de Loarca) 1591 (in documents on Report on Encomendas by Governor-General Luis Perez de Dasmarinas. In some Cedularios mentioning "Provincia de Bulacan" found by the research centre. It was the used grounds for declaring the year 1578 as Foundation of the Province.

Section III, New Provincial Administrative Code of 2007 provides that August 15, 1578 is Bulacan's foundation date, coinciding with the patronal festival of Nuestra Señora de la Asuncion, its patroness.

=== The Dasmariñas Document ===
According to the Relación de encomiendas en las Islas Filipinas, which may be considered as the first census report of the Philippines prepared by Governor Gómez Pérez de Dasmariñas in 1591, there were 75,000 "souls"in "La Pampanga", which included Bataán and Bulacán."

Under the vast multilingual region of "La Pampanga" (equal to present-day Regions), its encomiendas was divided into 4 Alcaldias (Provinces) which governed by its own Alcalde Mayor (Governor)

- The Alcaldia de Bitis y Lubao (encompasses the today's towns of Lubao, Guagua, Floridablanca, Sasmuan, and Sta. Rita, and its capital was the Betis 'y Lubao [Betis was downgraded in 1903 is now part of Municipality of Guagua]),
- Alcaldia de Candava (encompasses the today's towns of Northern Apalit, San Simon, San Luis, and Candaba as its capital),
- Alcaldia de Calonpite (more likely the Alcaldia de Calumpit and encompasses the today's towns of Macabebe, Masantol, Minalin, Santo Tomas, part of Southern and Eastern Apalit, Hagonoy, Malolos, (ceded to Alcaldia of Bulacan in 1580) and Calumpit as its capital), and
- Alcaldia de Bulacan (where its capital was at the present-day town of Bulakan, Bulacan and encompasses the encomiendas of Guiguinto, Caluya (Bigaa, now Balagtas) and Meycauayan, except those towns that were part of Alcaldia de Calonpite and the town of San Miguel, was then part of Pampanga ceded to Bulacan in 1847 were then at the progress of the province and placing the exact demarcation of the boundaries of the provinces of Pampanga and Bulacan.

All of these alcaldias under a Vast Region called La Pampanga, with one corrigmiento, and that was the Corigimiento de Batan (the today's Province of Bataan) were all have only one Alcalde Mayor but they all became alcaldias during the time of Governor-General Gonzalo Ronquillo de Peñalosa when he came as te 4th Governor-General in the Islands in 1580 according to Gov. Gen. Dasmariñas.

== Spanish colonial period ==
The history of the province from the Spanish occupation has been replete with events worthy of recollection. As early as the time of the coming of Legaspi to conquer Manila with two of his subordinate officers, Martin de Goiti and Juan Salcedo, the 1000 Bulakenyo Moros through their seafaring brothers from Hagonoy showed their instinctive love of country by helping Bambalito (source ?), a brave datu of Macabebe, a town quite near to Bulacan in Pampanga (which according to Conquistas de las Islas Filipinas of Fray Gaspar de San Agustin in the 1698. He was a brave youth from Macabebe), and another 1000 Kapampangan Moros of Macabebe, Hagonoy, Malolos, Guiguito, Lubao, Betis, and some records tells also Calumpit fought at the naval Battle of the Bangkusay on June 3, 1571. The first recorded heroic deed of the Bulakenyos in history. Here also in this battle, Spanish friars and chroniclers recorded that Bulakenyo and Kapampangan chiefs sent 40 karakoas (warships) to Tondo armed with lantaka swivel guns.

This is also recognized by historian Dr. Sonia M. Zaide as the first ever naval battle in the country.

By the time of Governor-General and adelantado Miguel Legazpi in 1571, Bulacan was reported to be well populated. The Spaniards organized the then-existing barangays in Bulacan into pueblos (towns). The first pueblo established in Bulacan is the town of Calumpit. Calumpit was also the birthplace of Roman Catholicism in the province.

The recorded history of Province of Bulacan might as well start in 1572, when Fray Martin de Rada and Fray Diego Vivar of Guadalajara, Mexico, an Augustinian, opened missions in Calumpit (headquarters) Malolos and Hagonoy. He was the first to plant the Cross on Calumpit at river bank of Meyto soil with the help of the force of the sword.

Fray Diego Vivar arrived in the Philippines from Mexico in 1570 and died in Pampanga in 1603. Three years later, the first pueblo established in Bulacan is the town of Calumpit, founded by the Augustinian friars in 1575.

In 1580 at the time of Don Gonzalo Ronquillo de Penalosa, Bulakan, (Bulacan) was established as the capital town of the province. With Bulakan as the centre, the missionaries and the military might of Spain worked hand in hand to subjugate the pagan population to accept the Catholic faith.

Fray Agustin Albuquerque prior provincial of Tondo in 1575 and established Bulakan as a mission in this town, then with 4,000 inhabitants.

According to Fray Juan de Medina, O.S.A. “All the Manila religious extol the “Indios” of this town as the most tractable and most attached to the church.

Secondary sources in the 1800s state that ”It has been said that in 1578 the Augustinian conquered Bulakan and that same year the Franciscan Friar Juan Plasencia and Fray Diego de Oropesa founded Meycauayan, then, and for a time was the capital, people were able to do so flourishing, so rich, that her sons are six of the best in the province.(Bocaue-1606, Polo-1623, San Jose del Monte-1751, OBando-1754, Santa Maria de Pandi-1792, and Marilao-1796 Researchers in the province studies the possibility of existing of Province of Meycauayan but the primary sources where the Apuntes Interesantes sobre Las Islas Filipinas obtained its statement.

It was on November 14, 1571 that Malolos founded as Encomienda primarily. Pre-colonial Malolos according to Blair and Robertson, the name “Li-han” was the ancient Chinese name for Malolos, whose leaders bore the title of “Gat-Salihan” or Gatchalian. Malolos originally belonged to Alcaldia of Calumpit in 1572 but in 1580 it was ceded to the newly established Alcadia de Bulacan. Malolos have it territories such as Quingua (separated in 1605) and Paombong (separated in 1619). Malolos became an independent town on June 11, 1580, with Fray Matheo de Mendoza as its first curate. The civil administration belongs to Don Jeronimo Tirado in the same year.

The town of Hagonoy already existed as a pre-colonial settlement. It was one of the participants of the Battle of Bangkusay on June 3, 1571.

On December 28, 1576, Governor General Sande orders the inclusion of Hagonoy to Calumpit. No exact year when it became an independent town from Calumpit presumably it was in the 1700s but it has already a huge church and convent in 1581. In 1578, Bulacan was separated from La Provincia de La Pampanga.

Hagonoy was officially founded in 1581 duly recognized by National Historical Commission of the Philippines (NCHP) despite that documents such as Loarca (1582) and Dasmarinas (1591) did not mention Hagonoy as an Encomienda or town on its own but part of Calumpit instead.

The first Bulakeño uprising against Spanish rule occurred in 1583 led by Magat Salamat from Hagonoy, claiming descendants to Rajah Matanda and the Lakadulas of Tondo. It was tagged in Philippine History as the Magat Salamat Revolution. The Chiefs of the towns of Polo, Catanghalan, Bulakan, Guiguinto, Hagonoy and Malolos was recruited to join. The planned revolt was preempted and the Chief of Bulakan Don Esteban Tasi was executed with other Bulakeño chieftains in the same year.

Don Felipe Salonga, chieftain of Catanghalan who started the revolt was exiled in the Islands to New Spain, Mexico.

A Royal Decree in 1595 created the Archbishop of Manila, which has jurisdiction of all the parishes in the province of Bulacan. The power of the church bells was now encompassing more and more pueblos under its sway. The Spanish colonisation policy of Cross and Sword worked marvels in the organization of the pueblos during the 17th century:

Bocaue a former visita of Meycauayan separated from its mother town in the year 1606 with its first minister R. P. Fr. Pedro de los Santos. In the year 1623 Polo became town with Fray Juan Tarancon OFM as its first minister and Don Juan Tibay as its Gobernadorcillo In 1628 Captain Fernando de Perona was appointed Alcalde Mayor of the Province of Bulacan and also as military commander.

A three-year war occurred in Bulacan province (1638–1640) where Chinese in many parts of Luzon revolted against Spain. There were more than 300 Chinese rebels killed in Bulacan by the Spaniards and the Bulakeños. Three years later (1643) another revolt took place led by Maloleno native Don Pedro Ladia, from Borneo. Ladia claimed that he was a descendant of Rajah Matanda, the King of Maynila in 1571. Ladia styled himself King of the Tagalog. This rebellion was checked by Fray Cristobal Enriquez. Ladia was arrested and sent to Manila where he was executed.

The last town in the 17th century succumb to the power of the bells was Paombong which became a town in 1619 established from Malolos.

=== Second batch of towns 1650-1800 ===
The second batch of Towns in the northwestern part of the Province was from the Old Quingua. Some of the towns founded were: Angat in 1683; Baliwag in 1733, San Rafael in 1758 (from Hacienda Buenavista), Pulilan in 1764, Norzagaray in 1857, San Ildefonso in 1887

Vast Augustinian Territory

In 1750 the Augustinians had 11 parishes in Bulacan, namely; Angat, Baliuag, Bigaa, Bulakan, Calumpit, Guiguinto, Hagonoy, Malolos, Paombong, Quingua. From 1760 to 1880 Augustinians added the town of Pulilan, San Rafael, Barasoain and Santa Isabel (separated in Malolos in 1859) San Ildefonso and Norzagaray counting it to 17 parishes.

Franciscan Territory

As the oldest among the Riconandas of the Franciscan territory tagged as the Old Meycauayan which established in 1578, six towns of the Province of Bulacan came from this town such as; Bocaue in 1606, San Jose del Monte in 1752, having Fray Estevan Gadea as its first minister. The decree of the foundation of the town of Obando was made by Governor-General Don Jose Francisco de Obando on May 14, 1753, directing the Franciscans that the visita of Polo(Catanghalan) be made into town, but only took effect the year after, 1754 under the term of Sr. Don. Francisco Morales Y Mozarabe-Alcalde Mayor of Bulacan. other towns are Marilao in 1794. and from Bocaue, Santa Maria will be established in 1792. and Pandi in 1940.

October 4, 1762 marked the Fall of Manila from the British invaders. That same night Simon de Anda y Salazar left Manila aboard a small banca for Bulakan, Bulacan. Early in the morning of October 5, 1762 Simon de Anda landed on the shores of Bulakan. On the same day Anda issued his first proclamation naming himself Captain General and the Supreme Governor of the Philippines and President of the Real Audiencia on account of the Fall of Manila to the British. At this time the province was headed by Capitan Don Jose Pasarin, alcade mayor. June 27, 1763, the battle of Malinta, Bulacan takes place between the British Army, reinforced by Chinese rebel, and Simon de Anda's Group. Afterwards Gen D. Jose de Bustos ordered the burning of the houses and transferred his camp to Meycauayan. During that time, many Tagalog refugees from Manila & north areas of Cavite escaped to Bulacan and to neighboring Nueva Ecija, where the original Kapampangan settlers welcomed them. Bulacan, along with Nueva Ecija, was natively Kapampangan when Spaniards arrived. Majority of Kapampangans sold their lands to the newly-arrived Tagalog settlers and others intermarried with and assimilated to the Tagalog, which made Bulacan dominantly Tagalog.

During the years 1745 and 1746 there were agrarian revolts in several provinces near Manila, which included Bulacan, on account of occupations of Filipino lands by religious orders. The agrarian revolt in Bulacan started in a small village between Hacienda de Malinta and Hacienda de lolomboy. In a royal decree of November 7, 1751, it noted that in the provinces of Bulacan, Cavite, Laguna and Morong (Rizal) (especially in the towns of Hagonoy, Malolos, Taguig, Parañaque, San Mateo, Bacoor, Cavite Viejo (Kawit), Silang, Imus, and Biñan the people revolted because the religious orders had usurped "the lands of the Indians, without leaving them the freedom of the rivers for their fishing, or allowing them to cut wood for their necessary use, or even to collect the wild fruits; nor did they allow the natives to pasture on the hills near their villages the carabaos which they used for agriculture."

On January 18, 1763, Capt. Slay left Manila for Bulacan with a force of 400 British soldiers, 300 Malabar Negroes and 2,000 Chinese allies. The Alcalde Mayor and Fr. Agustin de San Antonio, the Recollect Curate of Bulakan, fought them courageously but in vain. Fr. San Antonio died heroically in defending this town against the British invaders. But his death paved the way for unifying force among the Spaniards and Bulakeños.

It was in this first battle of Bulakan that the Catholic Church was burned. The British did not stay long in Bulakan, Bulacan. By June 1763, a strong force of Filipinos and Spaniards estimated at 8,000 stormed the town under the command of Jose Pedro Bustos. With heavy casualties, the British were forced to retreat to Manila. For the first time, the valor of the Bulakeño soldier was recorded in our history.

In an article by Isidro C. Gregorio of Aliaga, Nueva Ecija published in The Philippines Free Press on September 29, 1962, the following portion appears: “The British issued a proclamation declaring Anda a bandit and promising a reward of P5,000 for his capture, dead or alive. Anda countered with an edict awarding 10 million pesos to anyone who could kill or capture a British officer. While the fighting raged in the Philippines, the Seven Years War came to an end, resulting in the signing of a peace treaty on February 10, 1763. Called the Treaty of Paris, it gave the Philippines back to Spain.

Accordingly, on May 31, 1764, Anda and his men entered Manila to receive the city form the enemy. The turnover rites took place on that same day in the patio of the Sta. Cruz Church. The British sailed away after having occupied Manila for a year and a half.” The story of the British occupation cannot be told without mention of the courage and fighting spirit displayed by the Filipino warriors. In this connection, General Draper wrote in his journal: “Had their skill or weapons been equal to their strength and ferocity, it might have cost us dear. Although armed chiefly bows, arrows and lances, they advanced up to the very muzzles of our guns, and kept repeating their assaults…” The Fall of British in Bulakan marked a new epoch. It was a period of reconstruction: the government buildings were reconstructed but the church had to wait for another 50 years before it could be reconstructed from the ruins of war.

The Fall ushered in an era of peace that would last for more than a century. The Spanish colonizers also envisioned the use of the Cross and the Plow in giving the people of the pueblos under the bells an era of peace, progress and prosperity. In 1763 San Miguel was founded as a town by Miguel Pineda who became the first capitan municipal of the town. Vast tracts of land were cultivated and planted to the golden grain which brought bountiful harvest of the basic food. In 1782 Angat became a separate town from Bocaue.

The missionaries encourage the people of Angat to develop the iron mines for the production of harrows and ploughs for the peasants. The ploughs and harrows and other agricultural implements helped accelerate the agricultural development of the province.

In 1792 the town of Sta. Maria was founded and R. P. Fr. Francisco Javier became its First Curate. The separation of Marilao from Meycauayan was verified by a Decree dated April 21, 1796, and R. P. Fr. Vicente de Talavera was assigned as its first curate. In that same year Pulilan was founded by Augustinian friars. The symbol of this town up to the present is the carabao, the peasants’ beast of burden.

In 1848 its boundaries expanded to include the town of San Miguel de Mayumo and some adjacent territories from the province of Pampanga

== First Philippine Republic ==
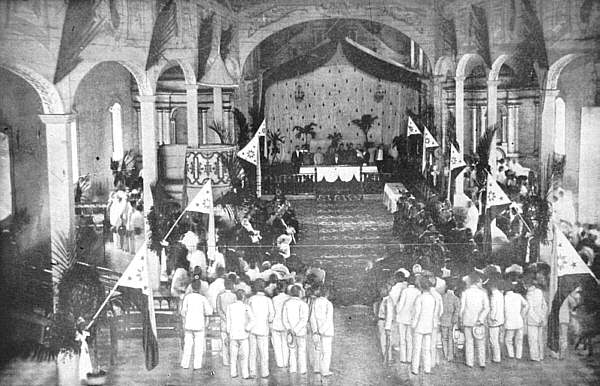
A session of the Malolos Congress at Barasoain Church.

At the height of the Filipino-Spanish conflict in the 1890s, Bulacan was one of the first eight provinces to take up arms against the Spaniards in 1896. However the first phase of the revolution ceased in 1897 with the signing of the Pact of Biak-na-Bato in San Miguel. Under it terms the leaders were to go to Hong Kong and reside there. Under the illusory peace created by the Pact, the end of 1897 saw greater determination pm the part of the Filipinos to carry on the revolution. In early 1898, the provinces of Zambales, Ilocos, Pampanga, Bulacan, Laguna, Pangasinan, Nueva Ecija, Tarlac. and Camarines rose again. In Central Luzon, a revolutionary government was organized under General Francisco Makabulos, a Kapampangan revolutionary leader of La Paz, Tarlac.

By the middle of 1898, the second phase of the revolution broke out and culminated with the establishment of the First Philippine Republic. Reynaldo Naguit's Hinubog sa Batong Buhay: Mga Dakilang Bulakenyo sa Kasaysayan (published by the Bahay-saliksikan ng Bulacan in 2004) noted that on June 1, 1898, Gregorio del Pilar attacked at the midnight the cazadores of the Spaniards in Bulakan, Bulacan. After the ranging smokes of the revolutionaries of del Pilar, at the break of the morning, Spaniards hid inside the Paroquia of the Nuestra Señora de la Asuncion and later surrendered with them. Also on this day, San Miguel de Mayumo was also liberated. June 10, 1898 San Ildefonso was next to be liberated. Following Biak-na-Bato on June 21, 1898, and finally on June 24, 1898, in Bulakan, Bulacan, the Spaniards finally liberated the Province and a treaty of surrendering was signed between the Spanish governor of the Province and del Pilar, the first Filipino governor of Bulacan appointed by Gen. Emilio Aguinaldo on June 19, 1898, to be the military dictator of Bulacan and Nueva Ecija. For the first time, the Philippine flag was hoisted and the national anthem was played by a band for the first time while the Spanish flag was struck down on the pole, with a feast celebrated for the whole day.

August 22, 1898 Gen. Aguinaldo announced that Malolos will be the next capital of the Philippines, as it formally became the seat on September 9, 1898, upon the revolutionary government arrival at Malolos. The Malolos Cathedral and the Barasoain Church became the executive headquarter of President Aguinaldo and the legislative headquarter of the Malolos Congress, respectively.

== American occupation period ==
The Americans established a local Philippine government in the Philippines when they held the first election in the country in the town of Baliuag, Bulacan on May 6, 1899.

In the book, The Philippines and Round About (published in 1899), George John Younghusband described the town of Malolos during the height of the Philippine–American War:

In Malolos, we saw considerable numbers of Spanish prisoners, bare-headed, bare-footed, and in rags, performing all the most menial offices as domestic servants to individual natives or as public scavengers. Every railway station was guarded by insurgent troops, and every train at each station was carefully examined by them. Not even an American can travel without a passport, and the only safe and convenient nationality to assume is that of a British subject.

== Japanese occupation and Second World War ==
In 1941, the Japanese bomber and fighter planes invaded Bulacan,

In 1942, the Japanese Imperial Army occupied Bulacan.

In 1942 to 1945, the ongoing local soldiers of the Philippine Commonwealth military and the Bulaceño guerrilla resistance fighters around the battles, sieges and invasions in the province of Bulacan during the Japanese Counter-Insurgencies and Allied Liberation against the Japanese Imperial armed forces.

In 1942 to 1946, the Military General Headquarters and Military Camp Bases of the Philippine Commonwealth Army was located in Bulacan and some parts in Central Luzon from 1942 to 1946, During the engagements of the Anti-Japanese Operations in Central Luzon from 1942 to 1945 and aiding helpful to the local guerrillas and U.S. military forces against the Japanese Imperial forces in the provinces of Bataan, Bulacan, Pampanga and Zambales during the Japanese Counter-Insurgencies (1942-1944) and Allied Liberation (1944-1945).

In 1945, combined Filipino and American forces including local guerrillas, attacked Japanese Imperial forces and liberated Bulacan.
