= Laguna Copperplate Inscription =

900 inscription found in the Philippines

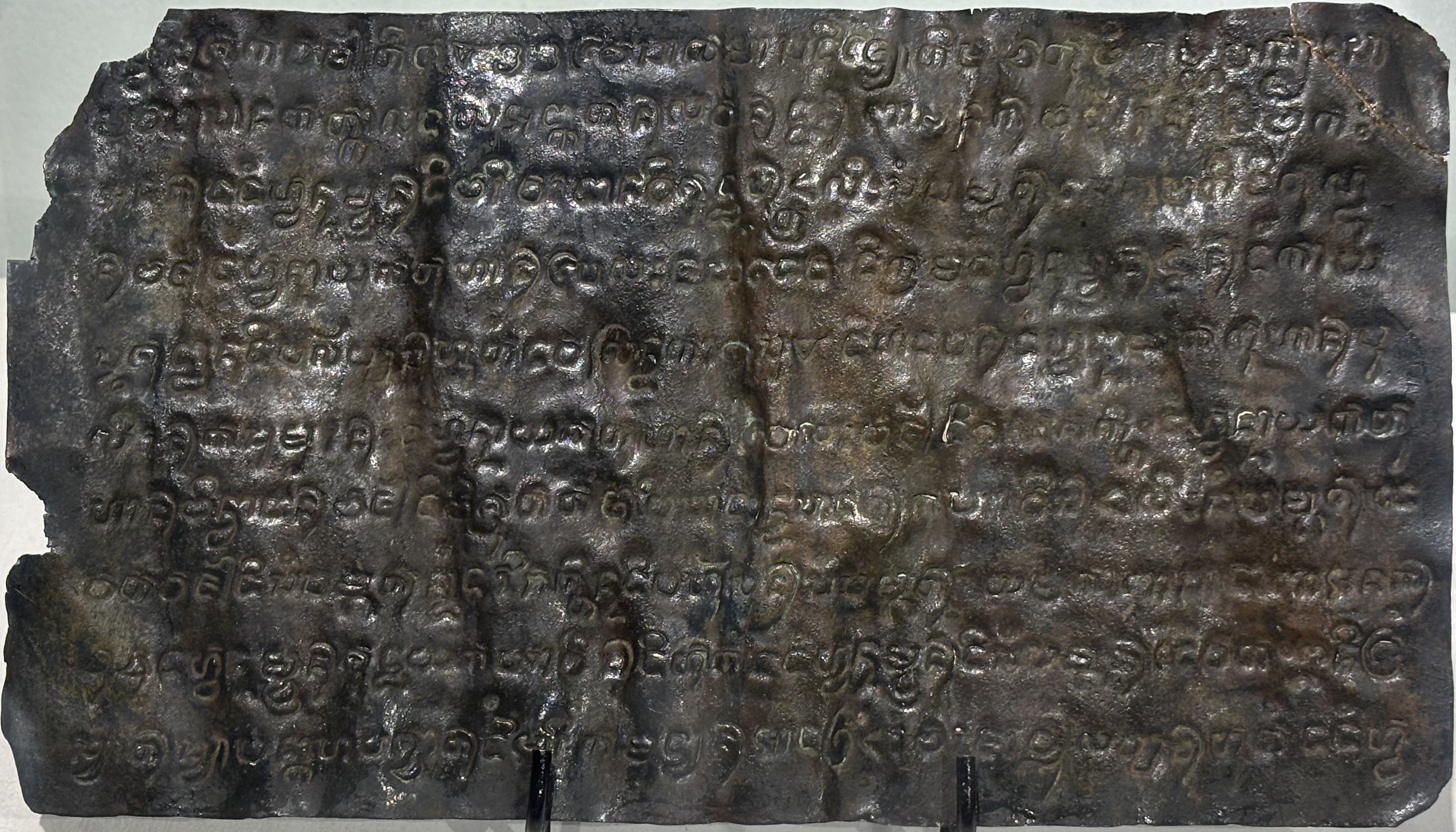
- The inscription displayed at the National Museum of Anthropology in Manila
- Material: Copper
- Height: <20 cm (7.9 in)
- Width: <30 cm (12 in)
- Created: April 21, 900 (1126 years ago)
- Discovered: 1987; Lumban, Laguna, Philippines
- Present location: National Museum of the Philippines
- Language: Mainly Old Malay with some Sanskrit and either possibly Old Javanese or Old Tagalog according to Antoon Postma

The Laguna Copperplate Inscription is an official acquittance (debt relief) certificate inscribed onto a copper plate in the Shaka year 822 (900 A.D.). It is the oldest extant document found in the Philippines.

The plate was unearthed in 1987 by a laborer near the mouth of the Lumbang River in Wawa, Lumban, Laguna, in the Philippines during a dredging operation. The inscription was mainly written in Old Malay using the Old Javanese script called Kawi script, with several technical Sanskrit words and either Old Javanese or Old Tagalog honorifics. After it was found, the text was first translated in 1991 by Antoon Postma, a Dutch anthropologist and Hanunó'o script researcher.

The inscription documents the existence and names of several surrounding states as of A.D. 900, such as the Tagalog city-state of Tondo. Some historians associate the toponym Medang in this inscription regarding the Medang palace in Java at that time, although the name is a common term of Malayo-Polynesian origin.

== Description ==
The inscription is made out of copper and measures about 20 by 30 centimeters (7.9 in × 11.8 in), with the words directly embossed onto the plate. It differs in manufacture from Javanese scrolls of the period, which had the words inscribed onto a heated, softened metal scroll.

It records the date as the year 822 of the Shaka era, the month of Vaishakha, and the fourth day of the waning moon on the weekday of Somavara, which corresponds to Monday, April 21, 900, on the Julian calendar. The text is in Old Malay, with numerous loanwords from Sanskrit and a few non-Malay vocabulary elements whose origin may be Old Javanese. The Sanskrit words are used for technical terms, while the Javanese words are used for forms of address. The Old Malay it uses differs from examples found in Java and Sumatra. The document states that it releases its bearers, the children of Namwaran, from debt in gold amounting to 1 kati and 8 suwarnas (865 grams; 27.8 troy ounces).

== Discovery ==
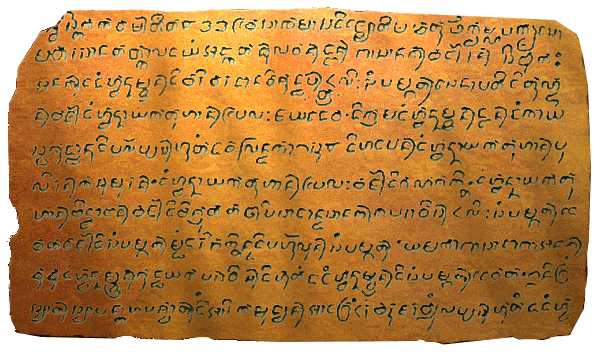
Emphasis on text of Namwaran's acquittance

The Laguna Copperplate Inscription was found in 1987 near the mouth of the Lumbang River near Laguna de Bay by a man named Arjay Angeles, who was dredging sand to turn it into concrete. Suspecting that the artifact might have some value, the man sold it to an antique dealer, who, having found no buyers, eventually sold it to the National Museum of the Philippines, where it was assigned to Alfredo E. Evangelista, head of its anthropology department. The National Museum refers to the artifact as the Laguna Copper Plate.

A year later, Antoon Postma noted that the inscription was similar to the ancient Indonesian script of Kawi. Postma translated the script and found the document dated itself to the Saka year 822, an old Hindu calendar date that corresponds to the year 900. It is from about the same time as the mention of the Philippines in the official Chinese Song dynasty History of Song for the year 972.

== Text ==
Line	Kawi text	Transliteration by Hector Santos (1995)	Preliminary translation by Antoon Postma (1992)	Notes
1	𑼱𑽂𑼮𑼱𑽂𑼡𑼶 𑼯𑼒𑼮𑼂𑼱𑼴𑼡𑼶𑼡 𑽘𑽒𑽒 𑼮𑼿𑼱𑼴𑼓 𑼪𑼴𑼱 𑼣𑼶 𑼙𑽂𑼫𑽀𑼡𑼶𑼰 𑼗𑼡𑼸𑼂𑼢 𑼒𑼺𑼰𑽂𑼠𑼦𑼒𑽂𑼰 𑼱𑽀-	swasti śakawarśatita 822 waisākha māsa diṃ jyotiṣa caturthi kr̥śnapakṣa so-	Hail! In the Saka-year 822; the month of March–April [= Vaishakh] according to the astronomer: the fourth day of the dark half of the moon; on	
2	𑼪𑼮𑼴𑼬 𑼱𑼴𑼪 𑼡𑼡𑽂𑼒𑼴𑼭 𑼣𑼫𑼁 𑼄𑼖𑽂𑼒𑼡𑼥𑽁 𑼭𑼮𑼥𑽁 𑼣𑽂𑼖𑼥𑽁𑼛 𑼱𑼴𑼥𑼒𑽁 𑼨𑼂𑼖𑼴𑼬𑼥𑽁 𑼱𑼶 𑼨𑼸𑼒𑼃	-mawāra sāna tatkāla dayaṃ aṅkatan lawan dṅanña sānak barṅāran si bukaḥ	Monday. At that time, Lady Angkatan together with her relative, Bukah by name,	
3	𑼄𑼥𑼒𑽁 𑼣 𑼣𑼁 𑼲𑽂𑼮𑼥𑽂𑼥𑼪𑽂𑼮𑽂𑼬𑼥𑽁 𑼣𑼶𑼨𑼬𑼶 𑼮𑼬𑼣𑼴𑼥 𑼮𑼶 𑼯𑼸𑼣𑽂𑼤𑼦𑽁𑼂𑼡 𑼈𑼭𑼶𑼃 𑼱𑼁 𑼦𑼪𑽂𑼔𑼡𑽁 𑼱𑼾𑼥𑼴𑼦𑼡𑼶 𑼱𑼶 𑼡𑼸𑼠𑽂𑼣𑼸-	anak da daṃ hwan namwaran dibari waradāna wi śuddhapatra uliḥ saṃ pamgat senāpati di tundu-	the child of His Honor Namwaran, was given, as a special favor, a document of full acquittal, by the Chief and Commander of Tundun	
4	𑼥𑽁 𑼨𑼬𑽂𑼙𑼴 𑼣𑼁 𑼲𑽂𑼮𑼥𑽂𑼥𑼴𑼫𑼒 𑼡𑼸𑼲𑼴𑼥𑽁 𑼦𑼿𑼭𑼃 𑼙𑼫𑼣𑼾𑼮 𑼣𑼶 𑼒𑽂𑼬𑼪 𑼣𑼁 𑼲𑽂𑼮𑼥𑽂𑼥𑼪𑽂𑼮𑽂𑼬𑼥𑽁 𑼣𑽂𑼖𑼥𑽁 𑼣𑼁 𑼒𑼴𑼫-	n barjā(di) daṃ hwannāyaka tuhān pailaḥ jayadewa. di krama daṃ hwan namwaran dṅan daṃ kāya-	representing the Leader of Pailah, Jayadewa. This means that His Honor Namwaran, through the Honorable Scribe	
5	𑼱𑽂𑼢 𑼯𑼸𑼣𑽂𑼤𑼴 𑼥𑼸 𑼣𑼶𑼦𑼂𑼭𑼦𑽂𑼦𑼱𑽁 𑼲𑼸𑼡𑼁 𑼣𑼮 𑼭𑼾𑼥𑽂𑼣𑼒𑼴 𑽑 𑼱𑼸 𑽘 𑼣𑼶 𑼲𑼣𑼦𑼥𑽁 𑼣𑼁 𑼲𑽂𑼮𑼥𑽂𑼥𑼴𑼫𑼒 𑼒 𑼡𑼹𑼲𑼥𑽁 𑼦𑼸-	stha śuddhā nu diparlappas hutaṃ da wale(da)nda kā(ti) 1 su(warna) 8 di hadapan daṃ hwannāyaka tūhan pu-	was totally cleared of a salary-related debt of 1 kati and 8 suwarna (weight of gold): in the presence of His Honor the Leader of Puliran,	
6	𑼭𑼶𑼬𑼥𑽁 𑼒𑼱𑼸𑼪𑼸𑼬𑼥𑽁 𑼣𑼁 𑼲𑽂𑼮𑼥𑽂𑼥𑼴𑼫𑼒 𑼡𑼸𑼲𑼴𑼥𑽁 𑼦𑼿𑼭𑼃 𑼨𑼂𑼙𑼣𑼶 𑼔𑼠𑼯𑼒𑽂𑼡𑼶 𑼣𑼁 𑼲𑽂𑼮𑼥𑽂𑼥𑼴𑼫𑼒 𑼡𑼸-	liran ka sumuran. daṃ hwannāyaka tuhān pailaḥ barjadi ganaśakti. daṃ hwannāyaka tu-	Kasumuran; His Honor the Leader of Pailah, representing Ganashakti; (and) His Honor the Leader	
7	𑼲𑼴𑼥𑽁 𑼨𑼶𑼥𑽂𑼮𑼴𑼖𑼥𑽁 𑼨𑼂𑼙𑼴𑼣𑼶 𑼨𑼶𑼯𑽂𑼬𑼸𑼡 𑼡𑼢𑼴𑼦𑼶 𑼱𑼴𑼣𑼴𑼥𑽂𑼣 𑼱𑼴𑼥𑼒𑽁 𑼒𑼦𑼬𑼴𑼮𑼶𑼱𑽁 𑼈𑼭𑼶𑼃 𑼱𑼁 𑼦𑼪𑽂𑼔𑼡𑽁 𑼣𑼾-	hān binuaṅan barjādi biśruta tathāpi sādānda sānak kaparāwis uliḥ saṃ pamgat de-	of Binuangan, representing Bisruta. And, with his whole family, on orders of the Chief of Dewata	
8	𑼮𑼡 𑼮𑼂𑼙𑼴𑼣𑼶 𑼱𑼁 𑼦𑼪𑽂𑼔𑼡𑽁 𑼪𑽂𑼞𑼁 𑼣𑼬𑼶 𑼩𑼒𑽂𑼡𑼶𑼥𑽂𑼣 𑼣𑼶𑼦𑼂𑼲𑼸𑼭𑼸𑼥𑽁 𑼱𑼁 𑼦𑼪𑽂𑼔𑼡𑽁 𑼫𑼪𑼒𑼴𑼛 𑼱𑼴𑼣𑼴𑼛 𑼄𑼥𑼒𑽁	wata warjādi saṃ pamgat mdaṃ dari bhaktinda diparhulun saṃ pamgat. ya makāña sādāña anak	representing the Chief of Mdang, because of his loyalty as a subject (slave?) of the Chief, therefore all the descendants	
9	𑼗𑼸𑼗𑼸 𑼣𑼁 𑼲𑽂𑼮𑼥𑽂𑼥𑼪𑽂𑼮𑽂𑼬𑼥𑽁 𑼯𑼸𑼣𑽂𑼤𑼫 𑼒𑼦𑼬𑼴𑼮𑼶𑼱𑽁 𑼣𑼶 𑼙𑼸𑼡𑼁 𑼣 𑼣𑼁 𑼲𑽂𑼮𑼥𑽂𑼥𑼪𑽂𑼮𑽂𑼬𑼥𑽁 𑼣𑼶 𑼱𑼁 𑼦𑼪𑽂𑼔𑼡𑽁 𑼣𑼾𑼮𑼡 𑼆𑼥𑼶 𑼔𑽂𑼬𑼁	cucu daṃ hwan namwaran śuddhaya kaparāwis di hutaṃ da daṃ hwan namwaran di saṃ pamgat dewata. ini graṃ	of His Honor Namwaran have been cleared of the whole debt that His Honor owed the Chief of Dewata. This (document) is (issued) in case	
10	𑼱𑽂𑼫𑼴𑼡𑽁 𑼱𑽂𑼫𑼴𑼦𑼴𑼥𑽂𑼡𑼴𑼲 𑼦𑼯𑽂𑼗𑼴𑼡𑽁 𑼣𑼶𑼁 𑼅𑼬𑼶 𑼒𑼪𑼸𑼣𑽂𑼫𑼥𑽁 𑼅𑼣 𑼔𑽂𑼬𑼁 𑼈𑼬𑼁 𑼮𑼬𑼸𑼙𑼬 𑼮𑽂𑼭𑼸𑼁 𑼒𑼦𑽂𑼦𑼱𑽁 𑼲𑼸𑼡𑼁 𑼣 𑼣𑼁 𑼲𑽂𑼮...	syāt syāpāntāha paścāt di ari kamudyan ada graṃ uraṃ barujara wluṃ lappas hutaṃ da daṃ hwa ...	there is someone, whosoever, some time in the future, who will state that the debt is not yet acquitted of His Honor...	Line 10 of the inscription is cut mid-sentence.

== Analysis ==
Antoon Postma, who first translated the Laguna Copperplate Inscription, suggested that the place names and personal names in the inscription needed to be carefully studied by scholars because "they furnish vital clues regarding the political and topographic background" of the world around the time of the inscription. He identified as toponyms the words Pailah, Tundun, Puliran, and Binuangan, and posited that Dewata and Medang could be either personal names or toponyms. Postma identified three of these toponyms, Binuangan, Pailah, and Puliran, as Malayo-Polynesian in origin, and three other toponyms, Tundun, Dewata, and Mdang, as being of Sanskrit origin.

After carefully considering possible interpretations of the text, including the possibility that Pailah and Puliran were located in the Laguna Lake region, Postma concluded that he was confident that Binuangan, Pailah, and Puliran "find their equivalents within the limited area of what is now known as Bulacan Province in the Philippines, [and that] the text of this same inscription can be considered to refer indeed to these places, already existing already under identical names in the tenth century".

=== Toponyms as Bulacan settlements ===
Postma emphasized that his interpretation of the inscription place names being in Bulacan puts these named settlements on key locations on Central Luzon's river systems, which he referred to as "water highways", which allowed "an effective (and often only) means of transportation and communication between the different settlements", as well as providing Chinese and Southeast Asian maritime traders easy access to interior trading centers via rivers. He also noted that Central Luzon's rivers were "much deeper and certainly were more navigable than they are today".

Postma's assertions have been challenged, notably by the Pila Historical Society Foundation and local historian Jaime F. Tiongson, but have not been fully resolved by scholarly peer review.

=== Words affirmed as toponyms ===
Postma asserted that he was fairly certain that four words in the inscription were place names, or toponyms: "Pailah" (lines 4 and 6), "Tundun" (line 3), "Puliran" (line 6), and "Binuangan" (line 7).

==== Tundun ====
Tundun, whose name Postma believed to be "Sanskrit in origin", was referenced in line 3 of the inscription. It is the most easily recognizable of the toponyms identified by Postma in the inscription, and scholarly consensus generally agrees with Postma's original identification of the inscription's Tundun as Tondo, the polity located on the northern seaside of the Pasig River delta, where the Pasig River empties into Manila Bay.

Postma left an avenue for an alternative interpretation open, however, saying that Mdang and Tondo "because of their lingual consonants (n and d) that are of Sanskrit origin might originally be toponyms existing on the Island of Java".

==== Pailah ====
Postma identified Pailah, whose name he believed to be Austronesian in origin, as a "locality with its leader". It was referenced twice, in lines 4 and 6 of the inscription. Locating its possible location in Bulacan, Postma proposed its site to be "the village of Paila, in Barangay of San Lorenzo at the eastern part of the municipality of Norzagaray, with coordinates 14–54.5 & 121-06.9". However, it might also be referred to the Pailaha region part of North Sulawesi province located in the northern Sulawesi.

==== Puliran ====
Postma identified Puliran, whose name he believed to be Austronesian in origin, as a "locality with its own leader" referenced in line 6 of the inscription. Postma asserted that Puliran was probably located in modern-day Bulacan, on the current site of "Pulilan, along the Angat River (pronounced: Anggat) north of Manila, (coordinates: 14–54.2 & 120-50.8)".

==== Binuangan ====
Postma believed that the place-name of Binuangan, referenced in line 7 of the inscription as a locality with its own leader, was Austronesian in origin. Locating its possible location in Bulacan, Postma proposed its site to be "the village of Binuangan, belonging to the municipality of Obando, situated at the mouth of the Bulacan River, with coordinates 14–43.2 & 120–543".

=== Inscription words believed to be possible place names ===
Based on linguistic analysis, Postma concluded that the words Dewata and Mdang "could be either personal names or toponyms". He noted that their names seemed to be Sanskrit in origin but did not go into a deep discussion of where they might have been located, other than to say Mdang was already known as a place name in Indonesia.

Abinales and Amoroso (2005) note that the leaders of Dewata and Mdang (if these words are indeed to be accepted as toponyms) were not present for the transaction but were rather invoked as authorities in certifying the cancellation of the debt in question: "Jayadewa invokes the authority of the chief of Dewata, who in turn represents the chief of Medang".

==== Mdang ====
Postma's paper proposing his translation and interpretation of the inscription mentions that his search of the Indonesian toponym listings developed by Damais and Darmosoetopo, as well as his consultation with the 14th Congress of the Indo-Pacific Prehistory Association (IPPA) in August 1990, determined that Mdang was the only (possible) toponym in the inscription that matched known Indonesian place names.

Abinales and Amoroso (2005), citing Patanñe (1996) note that this seems to refer to "a temple complex in Java, where the kingdom of Mataram was a rival to Srivijaya".

==== Dewata ====
Scholars after Postma, such as Patanñe (1996) and Abinales and Amoroso (2005) have come to identify the Dewata of the inscription as a settlement in or near "present-day Mount Diwata, near Butuan".

While it is clear from the text of the inscription that Jayadewa of Tondo is invoking the authority of the Chief of Dewata, the precise relationship between Dewata and Mdang is less clear. E.P. Patanñe notes: "This relationship is unclear but a possible explanation is that the chief of Dewata wanted it to be known that he had a royal connection in Java."

=== Other proposed interpretations of toponyms ===
Postma's assertions regarding the exact locations of Pailah, Puliran, and Binuangan have been challenged by the Pila Historical Society Foundation and local historian Jaime F. Tiongson, who assert that the place names Pailah and Puliran are more likely to refer to places close to where the plate was found—in Lumban—given that archeological findings in nearby Pila show the presence of an extensive settlement during precolonial times.

According to Tiongson's interpretation, Pailah refers to Pila; Puliran refers to Puliran, the old name of the territory that occupied the southeastern part of Laguna de Bay at the time; and Binuangan refers to a modern-day barangay, Binawangan in Capalonga, Camarines Norte.

=== Vocabularies ===
The inscription contains a great number of words derived from Sanskrit, starting with a line of astronomical terms that indicate the date of the inscription in detail. It also has some Old Javanese and Old Tagalog words expressing ceremonious forms of address. However, the main language of the inscription is Old Malay, which served as the lingua franca, or trade language, of the whole archipelago during those times. The most significant indication of Old Malay features is found in verbal affixes used in the inscription, e.g. bar-, di-, and dipar-, which correspond to ber-, di-, and diper-, respectively, in modern Malay and Indonesian. Old Malay words and their modern Malay and Indonesian counterparts are listed below, each followed by its English gloss:

- sana = sana = there
- tatkala = tatkala = while, during
- dayang = dayang (also used in Tag.) = court maiden
- lawan = lawan (Tag. cognate is laban) = counterpart
- dengan = dengan = with
- -nya = -nya = his / her / its (possessive suffix)
- sanak = sanak = relative, kindred
- anak = anak (also used in Tag.) = child
- bari = beri (Tag. cognate is bigay) = give
- ulih = oleh = by, from
- di, ding = di = at, in, of
- jadi = jadi = become
- tuhan = tuan = leader, master
- shuddha = sudah = already
- lappas = lepas (Tagalog cognate is lipas) = unbounded, escaped
- hutang = hutang (Tagalog/Indonesian cognate is utang) = debt
- hadapan = hadapan (borrowed into Tag. as harapan) = in front
- tathapi = tetapi = but
- sadanda = sadanya (preserved in Minangkabau) = whole, all
- dari = dari = from
- bhakti = bakti = dedication, devotion
- hulun = hulun (Classical Mal.) = slave, subject
- makanya = makanya = therefore
- chuchu = cucu = grandchild
- kaparawis = diperhabis = cleared (compare to Old Javanese (h)awis = cleared)
- ini = ini = this
- gerang = gerang (Classical Mal.) = perchance
- ari = hari = day
- kamudyan = kemudian = afterwards, later
- ada = ada = exist, there is
- urang = orang = person, people
- barujara = berujar (Classical Mal.) = state, say, utter (compare to Old Javanese tujara)
- wellung = belum = not yet

Aside from the Sanskrit and Old Malay words, there are also some pure Old Javanese words that have no cognates in Old Malay, or at least have not been found in other Old Malay inscriptions, like ngaran (name) and pamegat (leader, chief). In an Old Malay inscription, one would expect barnama instead of barngaran because nama is the Sanskrit-derived word for 'name' in Old and Modern Malay. Pamegat is another Old Javanese word that frequently occurs in Old Javanese inscriptions but not in Old Malay ones. It is often preceded by the honorific sang, as in the inscription. These words are accepted as Old Javanese words but could be Old Tagalog as well because they exist in both of these languages.

== Significance ==
The Laguna Copperplate Inscription, together with other recent finds such as the Golden Tara of Butuan and 14th-century pottery and gold jewelry in Cebu, is highly important in revising ancient Philippine history, which some Western historians previously considered culturally isolated from the rest of Asia, as no evident pre-Hispanic written records had been found at the time. Philippine historian William Henry Scott debunked these theories in 1968 with his Prehispanic Source Materials for the Study of Philippine History, which was subsequently published in 1984. The locations mentioned are all near rivers, suggesting Old Malay may have come to the area along trade networks.

The inscription demonstrates pre-Hispanic literacy and culture and is considered a national treasure. It is currently deposited at the National Museum of Anthropology in Manila.

It is the earliest document that shows the use of mathematics in precolonial Philippine societies. The use of precise measurement for gold demonstrates a standard system of weights and measures, and fixing the precise day within the month in relation to the phases of the moon shows familiarity with rudimentary astronomy.

In 2026, the inscription was included in the UNESCO Memory of the World Regional Register.

== Southeast Asian context ==
Prior to the European colonial era, Southeast Asia was under the Indosphere of greater India, where numerous Indianized principalities and empires flourished for several centuries in what are now Myanmar, Thailand, Indonesia, Malaysia, Singapore, Brunei, the Philippines, Laos, Cambodia, and central and southern Vietnam. The influence of Indian culture in these areas was given the term indianization. French archaeologist George Coedes defined it as the expansion of an organized culture that was framed by the Indian origins of royalty, Hinduism and Buddhism, and the Sanskrit dialect. This can be seen in the Indianization of Southeast Asia, the spread of Hinduism, and the transmission of Buddhism. The Indian diaspora, both ancient (PIO) and current (NRI), played an ongoing key role as professionals, traders, priests, and warriors. Indian honorifics also influenced Malay, Thai, Filipino, and Indonesian honorifics.

The pre-colonial native Filipino script Baybayin (ᜊᜌ᜔ᜊᜌᜒᜈ᜔), known in Visayan as badlit (ᜊᜇ᜔ᜎᜒᜆ᜔), as kur-itan/kurditan in Ilocano, and as kulitan in Kapampangan, was itself derived from the Brahmic scripts of India. Its use was recorded in the 16th century by Miguel López de Legazpi.

== Cultural references ==
The inscription shows heavy Sanskrit and Old Javanese linguistic influences. Among the observations made by Antonio Pigafetta in the 16th-century Boxer Codex was that Old Malay had currency among classical-period Filipinos as a lingua franca. The Golden Tara statue, an ancient artifact discovered in Butuan, Agusan del Norte, dates from the same period and strongly suggests the presence of Hindu–Buddhist beliefs prior to the introduction (and subsequent subscription) to Roman Catholicism and Islam among Filipinos.

== Other inscriptions from nearby regions ==
These inscriptions are all from the province of Central Java, Indonesia (except for the Kalasan inscription, which is in the adjacent Special Region of Yogyakarta).

- Canggal inscription (732)
- Kalasan inscription (778)
- Kelurak inscription (782)
- Karangtengah inscription (824)
- Tri Tepusan inscription (842)
- Shivagrha inscription (856)
- Mantyasih inscription (907)

== See also ==
- Related topics
  - Buddhism in the Philippines
  - Indonesian Esoteric Buddhism
  - Indosphere
  - Indian cultural influences in early Philippine polities
  - Hinduism in the Philippines
  - List of India-related topics in the Philippines
  - Golden Tara
  - Tabon Caves Garuda Gold Pendant
  - Suyat
  - Early Indian epigraphy
- Copperplate inscriptions in Southeast and South Asia
  - Copperplate
  - Kaladi copperplate inscriptions of Java
  - Balinese copperplate inscriptions
  - Tamil copperplate inscriptions
  - Indian copper plate inscriptions
