= Binuangan, Obando =

Binuangan
- Barangay
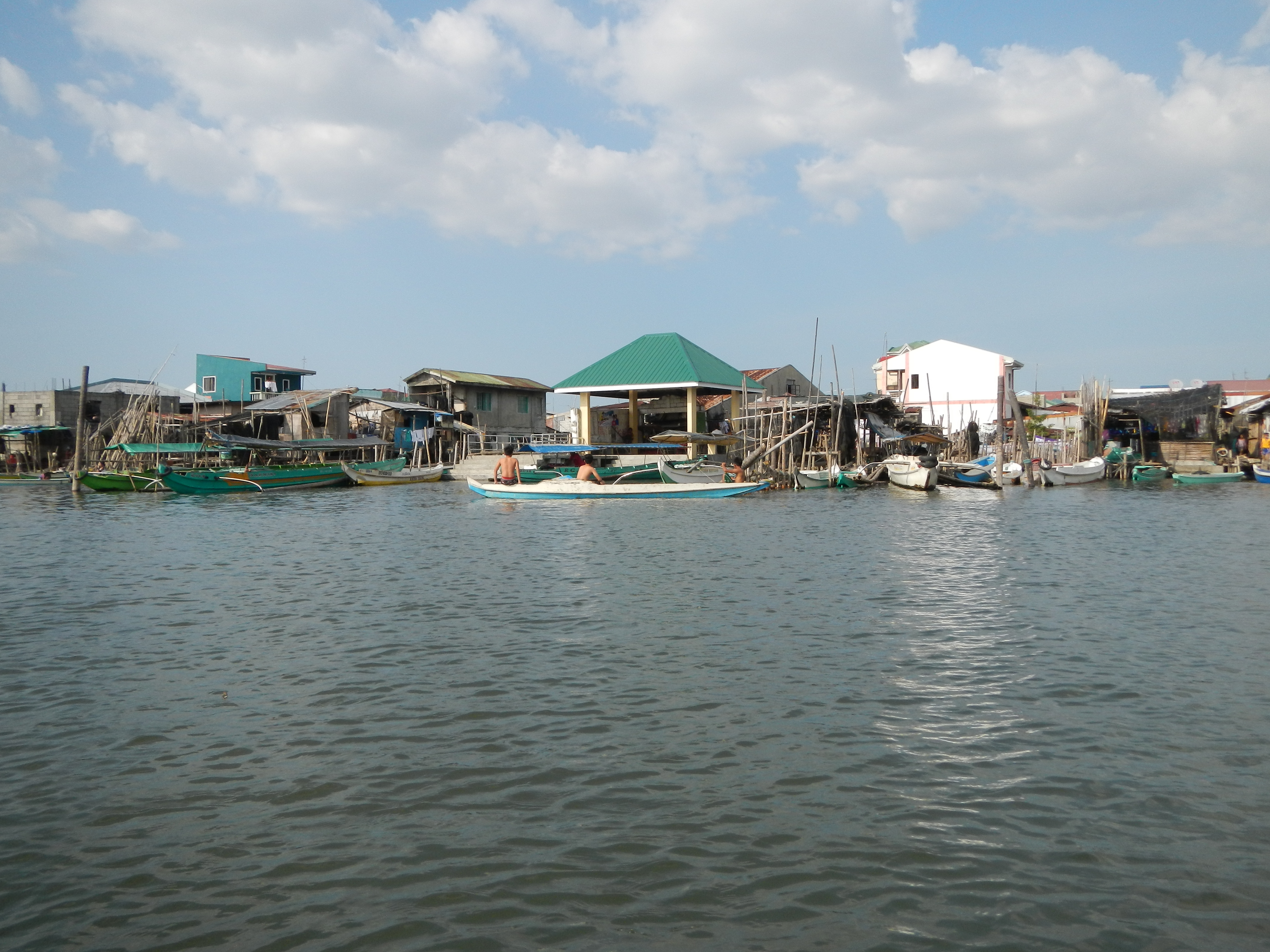
- View of the island barangay from Salambao
- Interactive map of Binuangan
- Location within Luzon Location within Philippines
- Coordinates: 14°43′16″N 120°54′23″E
- Country: Philippines
- Region: Central Luzon
- Province: Bulacan
- Municipality: Obando

Government
  - Barangay Chairman: Jerry Silverio Mendoza

Population (2020)
  - Total: 5,045
- ZIP code: 3021
- Area code: 44

Binuangan is a barangay in the coastal municipality of Obando in Bulacan, the Philippines. It is an island on an estuary formed by the confluence of Binuangan River and Muzon River along the coast of Manila Bay, north of Isla Pulo, Tanza, Navotas. The barangay is surrounded by intertidal mudflats and sandbars with fish pens separating it from the mainland of Obando to the east. It is bordered by the barangays of Tawiran and Paco on the north, Lawa to the east, Salambao on the south, and the Bulakan barangay of Taliptip to the west. As of the 2020 census, Binuangan had a population of 5,045. Binuangan is an ancient barangay, mentioned in the earliest known document of the Philippines, the Laguna Copperplate Inscription in 900 AD.

== See also ==
- List of islands by population density
- List of islands in the Greater Manila Area
