= Obando, Bulacan =

Municipality in Bulacan, Philippines

Obando
- Municipality
- Municipality of Obando
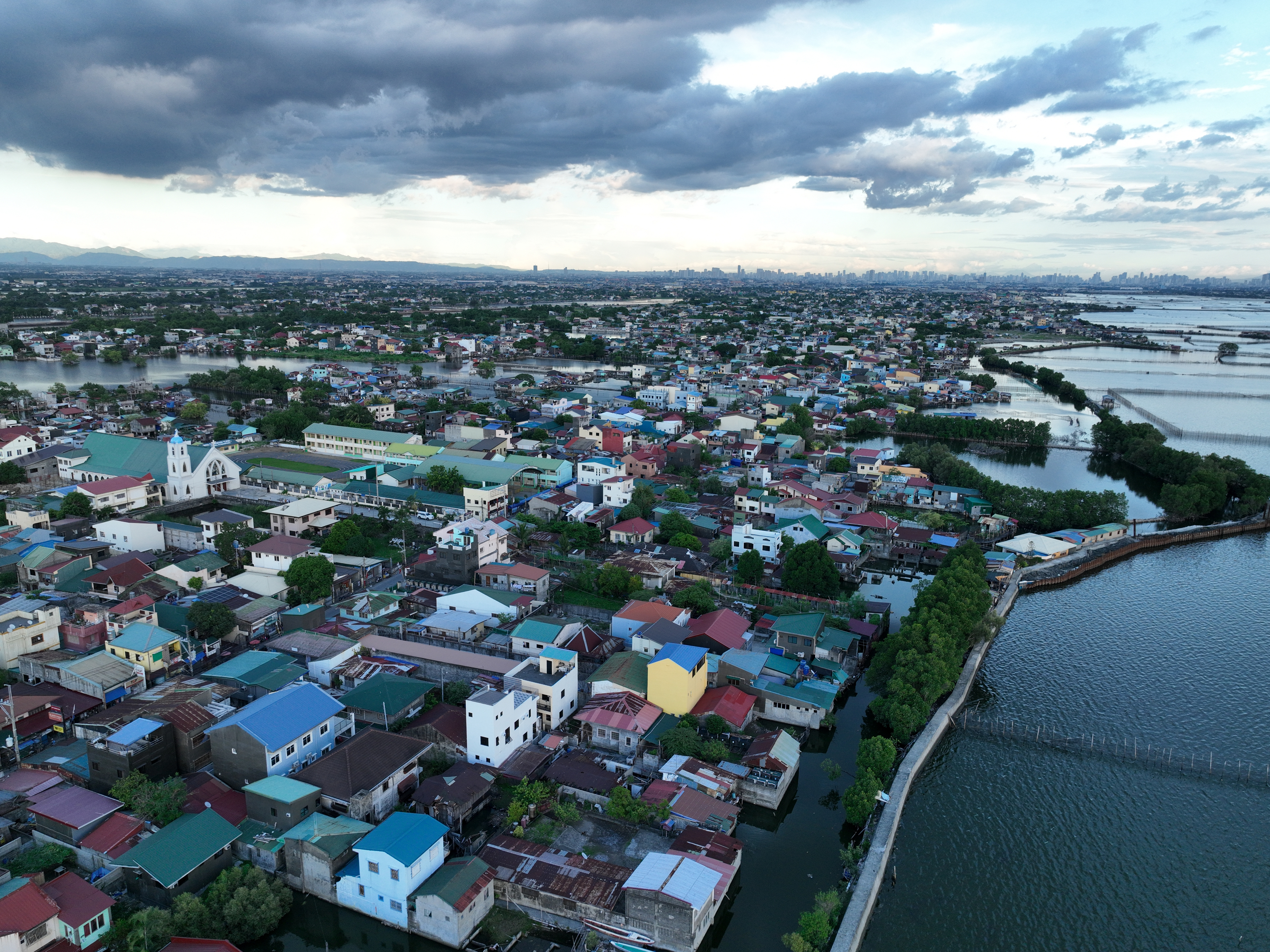
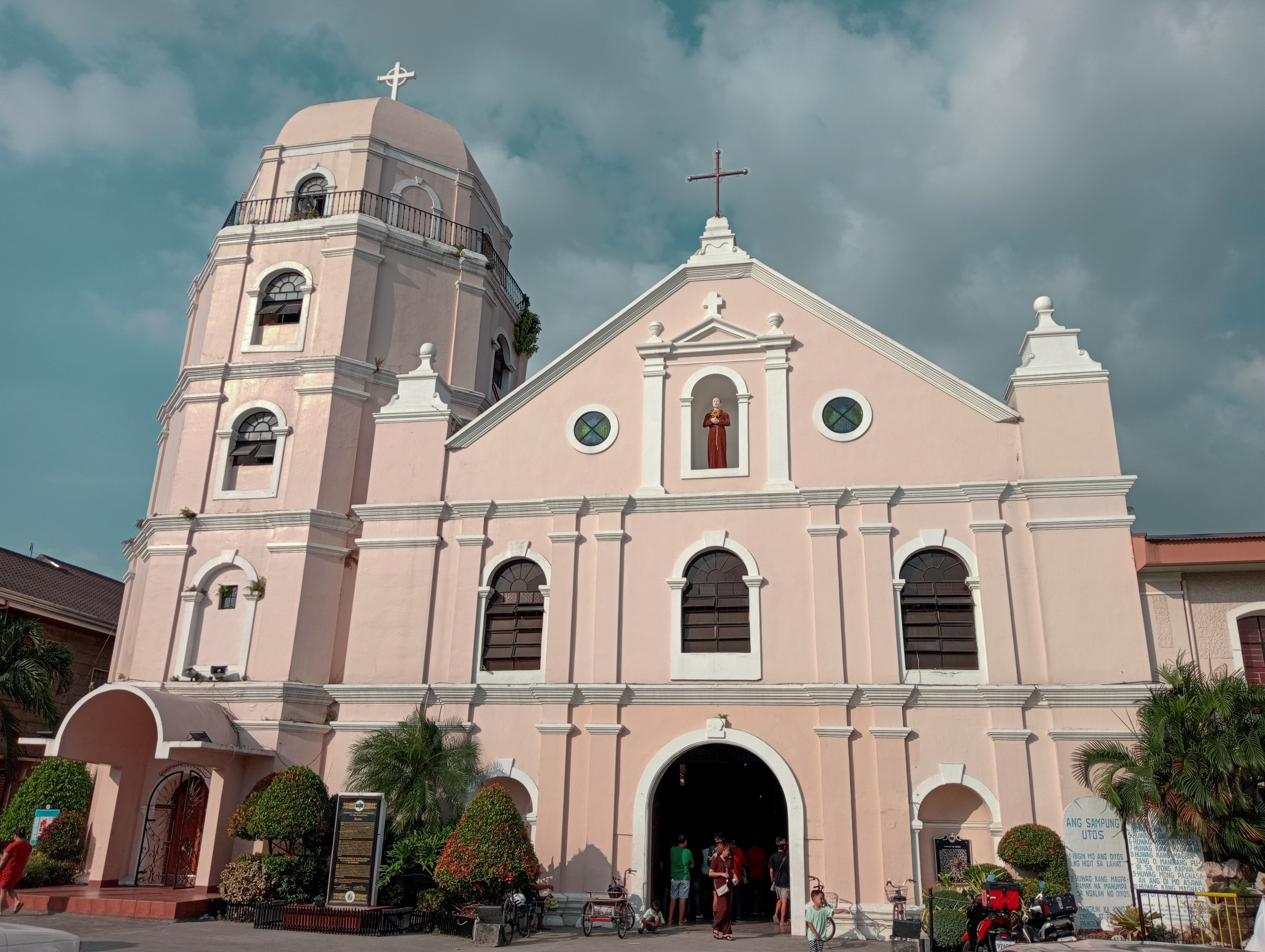
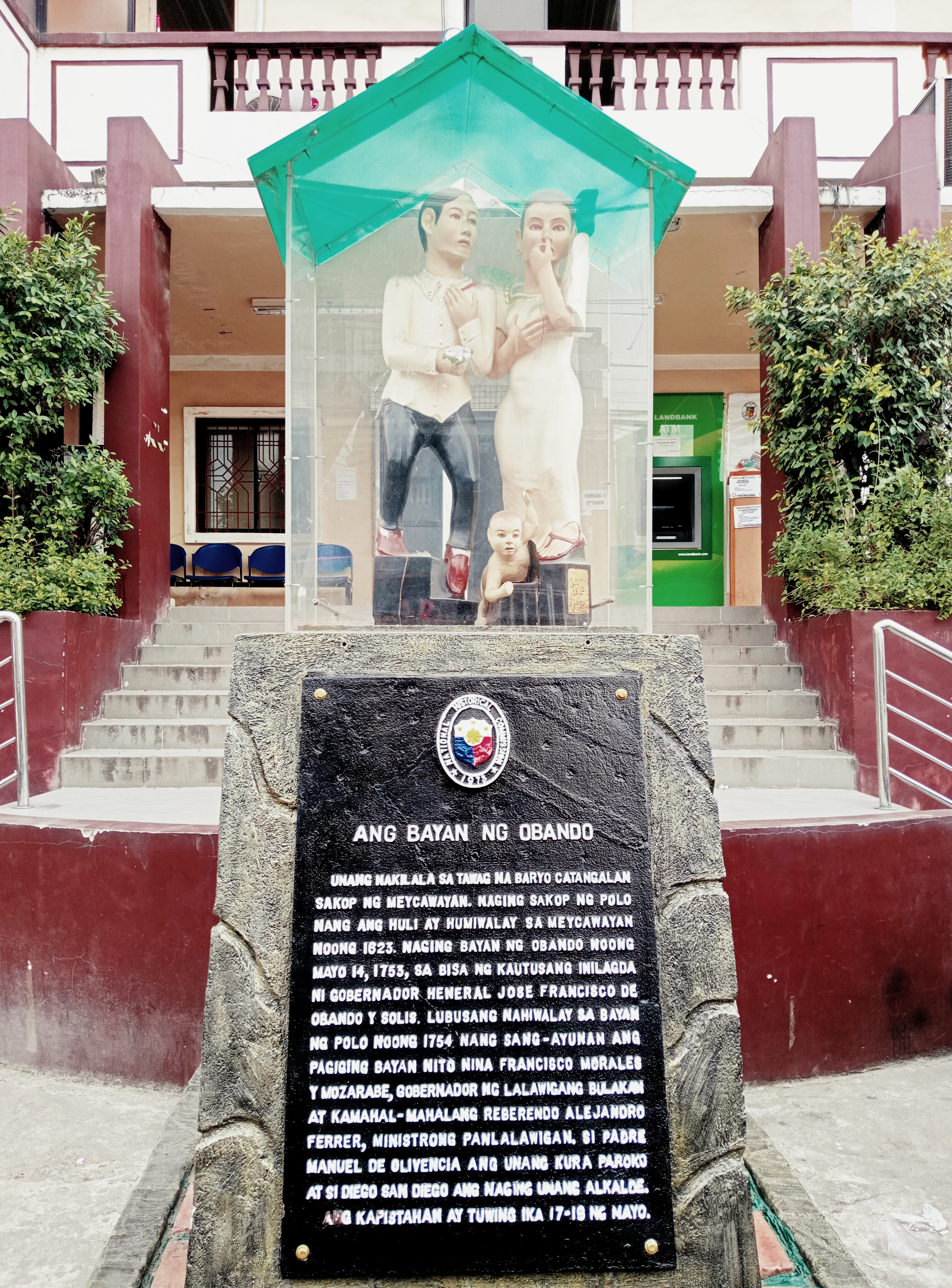
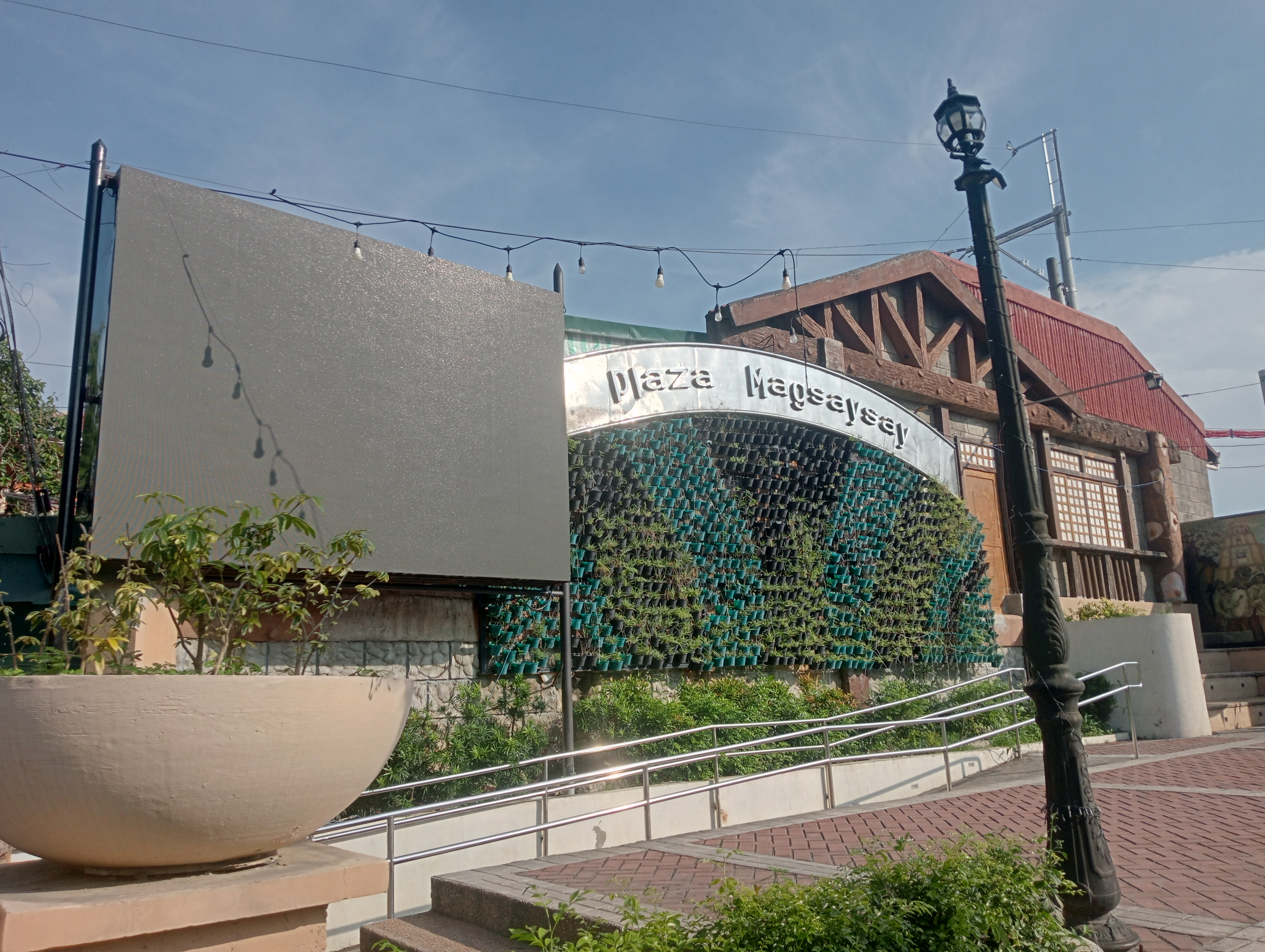
- Skyline Obando Church Obando Fertility Rites and Dance Monument Plaza Magsaysay

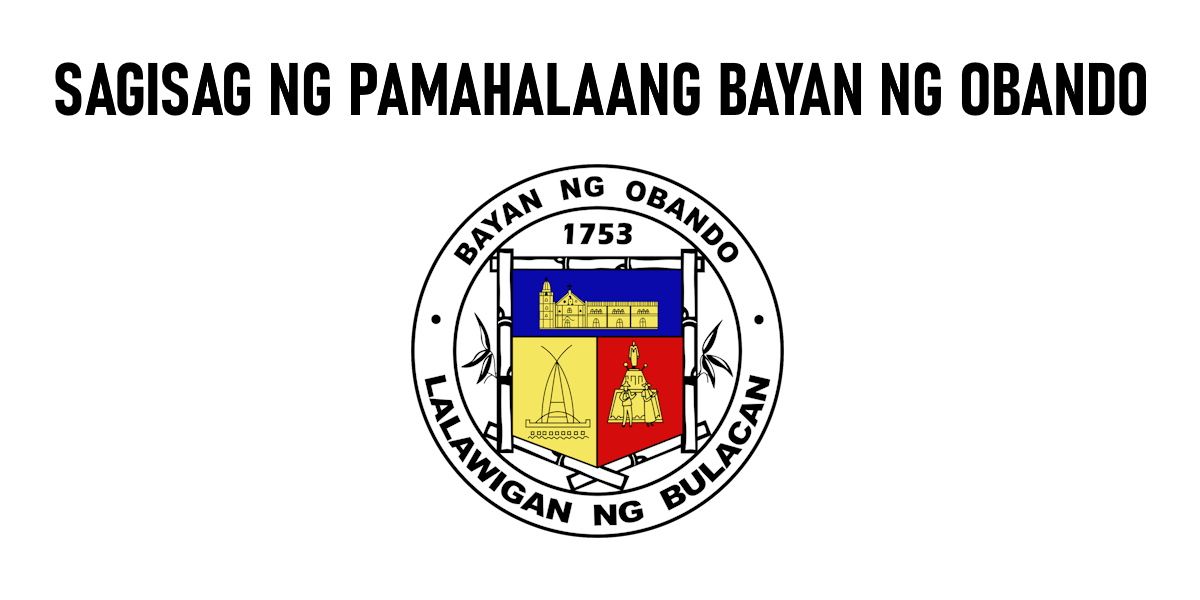
- Flag Seal
- Motto: Obando, Bayang Pinagpala! English: Obando, Blessed Town!
- Anthem: Bayang Pinagpala; English: Blessed Town
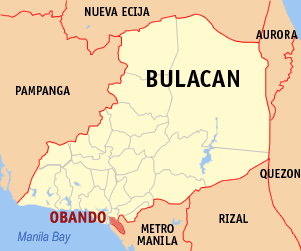
- Map of Bulacan with Obando highlighted
- Interactive map of Obando
- Location within the Philippines
- Coordinates: 14°42′30″N 120°56′15″E
- Country: Philippines
- Region: Central Luzon
- Province: Bulacan
- District: 4th district
- Founded: May 14, 1753
- Annexation to Polo: October 8, 1903
- Chartered: August 10, 1907
- Named for: Francisco José de Ovando, 1st Marquis of Brindisi
- Barangays: 11 (see Barangays)

Government
  - Type: Sangguniang Bayan
  - Mayor: Leonardo D. Valeda (PFP)
  - Vice Mayor: Rowell S. Rillera (PFP)
  - Representative: Linabelle Ruth R. Villarica (PFP)
  - Municipal Council: Members: Drandren R. De Ocampo; Felipe F. Dela Cruz; Gladys Lyn G. De Leon; Michael L. Dela Paz; Evangeline B. Bautista; Erwin M. Valeda; Lawrence R. Banag; Gerald M. Gomez
  - Electorate: 34,184 voters (2025)

Area
  - Total: 52.10 km^{2} (20.12 sq mi)
- Elevation: 5.0 m (16.4 ft)

Population (2024 census)
  - Total: 61,073
  - Density: 1,172/km^{2} (3,036/sq mi)
  - Households: 15,171

Economy
  - Income class: 1st municipal income class
  - Poverty incidence: 10.77% (2023)
  - Revenue: ₱ 256.9 million (2024)
  - Assets: ₱ 271.5 million (2024)
  - Expenditure: ₱ 264.2 million (2024)
  - Liabilities: ₱ 77.45 million (2024)

Utilities
  - Electricity: Meralco
- Time zone: UTC+8 (PST)
- ZIP code: 3021
- PSGC: 0301414000
- IDD : area code: +63 (0)44
- Native languages: Tagalog
- Website: obandopilipinas.wordpress.com

Obando, officially the Municipality of Obando (Tagalog: Bayan ng Obando), is a municipality in the province of Bulacan, Philippines. According to the 2024 census, it has a population of 61,073 people.

== History ==
Obando was likely originally called Binuwangan according to 18th-century maps. In the 1734 map of the Philippine islands by Pedro Murillo Velarde, the places labeled Vinuangan, Polo (now Valenzuela), and Maycauayan were indicated separately and proximate to one another.

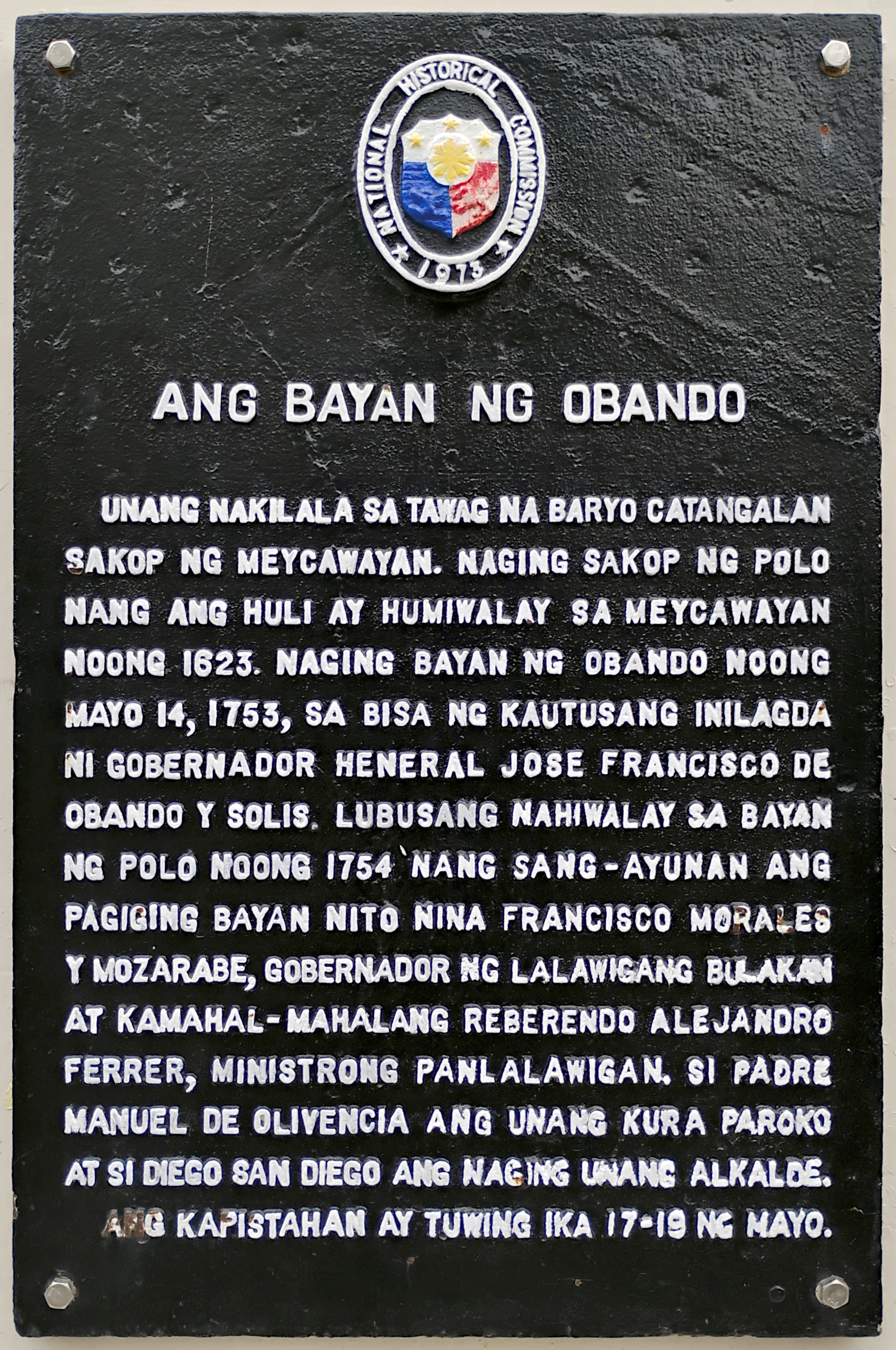
Historical marker created by the National Historical Commission in 1973 to commemorate the town

In the 18th century, the present-day town of Obando formed part of Meycauayan, alongside the present-day cities of Valenzuela (formerly Polo) and San Jose del Monte. The towns of Polo and Obando formed a single barrio called Catanghalan. In the year 1623, the municipality of Polo was organized which included parts of modern Obando. By virtue of a decree promulgated during the time of Governor and Captain General, Francisco José de Obando y Solís, the town was created and separated from its mother town Polo on May 14, 1753. Upon the Governor-General’s untimely death at the hands of the British during the Seven Years' War, the creation and establishment of the town was made and attended by the Alcalde Mayor of the province, Don Francisco Morales y Mozabe, the Provincial Minister, S. Gregorio, Rev. Fr. Alejandro Ferrer, together with numerous religious devotees. The minister chosen for the new town was Rev. Fr. Manuel de Olivencia. On October 8, 1903, Obando was merged with Polo by virtue of Act No. 932 under the United States-run Insular Government.

On August 10, 1907, Obando was made an independent town of Bulacan. Through the untiring efforts of municipal officials, a portion of Gasak, Navotas was reclaimed to form a part of Obando. The municipal officials, believing that this portion was once a part of the municipality but adopted by Navotas in the course of time, effortlessly pushed through its claim to regain the area. The concerted action of all those concerned paid off when on January 30, 1975, by virtue of Presidential Decree No. 646, a portion of approximately 1.78 square kilometers of Gasak, Navotas was returned to Obando. This parcel of land is mostly fishpond and sandy beach and it is expected that, when fully developed, it would serve as a tourist attraction. By a resolution of the municipal council in 1975, the area was made into a barangay and named Nuestra Señora de Salambao in honor of one of the three patron saints.

== Geography ==
Obando is bordered by Valenzuela to the east, Navotas and Malabon to the south, Bulakan to the north, and the waters of Manila Bay to the west. It is 16 kilometers (9.9 mi) away from the Philippine capital Manila and is part of Manila's conurbation which reaches San Ildefonso in its northernmost part.

Flat and low-lying coastal plains characterize the general topography of Obando. The area was formerly an estuary, but it filled up partially from the peripheral parts of sand bars and sand spits and formed up into the current area that mainly consists of a commercial district, partly industrial district, residential area and fishpond. Within the municipality are two rivers and three creeks, namely the Meycauayan River in the north, the Pinagkabalian River in the south, and Paco Creek, Hulo Creek and Pag-asa Creek traversing the town parallel to the provincial road.

Obando, just like the other towns of Bulacan, has two pronounced seasons: dry and wet. The wet season is from May to October and the dry season is from November to April. The rainfall of the wet season accounts for about 80% of the annual rainfall, which is due to monsoons and typhoons.

=== Barangays ===
Obando is politically subdivided into 11 barangays, as shown in the matrix below. Each barangay consists of 7 puroks and some have sitios. There are 8 urban and 3 rural barangays.

Barangays Binuangan (ancient "Binwangan" mentioned on the Laguna Copperplate Inscription, which is the oldest written document of Philippines inscribed in Indianized script, dating back to 900 CE) and Salambao are located along the Paliwas River, and can be reached only by means of motorized boats.

PSGC	Barangay	Population			±% p.a.	
		2024		2010		
031414001	Binuangan	8.5%	5,218	5,213	▴	0.01%
031414002	Catanghalan	5.2%	3,164	3,181	▾	−0.04%
031414003	Hulo	4.1%	2,503	2,475	▴	0.08%
031414004	Lawa	18.8%	11,452	8,118	▴	2.42%
031414005	Salambao	2.6%	1,575	1,336	▴	1.15%
031414006	Paco	11.2%	6,866	6,676	▴	0.19%
031414007	Pag‑asa (Poblacion)	5.7%	3,458	3,381	▴	0.16%
031414008	Paliwas	10.0%	6,113	6,081	▴	0.04%
031414009	Panghulo	20.9%	12,763	12,533	▴	0.13%
031414010	San Pascual	11.8%	7,228	7,074	▴	0.15%
031414011	Tawiran	3.0%	1,857	1,941	▾	−0.31%
	Total		61,073	58,009	▴	0.36%

=== Climate ===
Climate data for Obando, Bulacan
Month	Jan	Feb	Mar	Apr	May	Jun	Jul	Aug	Sep	Oct	Nov	Dec	Year
Mean daily maximum °C (°F)	29 (84)	30 (86)	32 (90)	34 (93)	33 (91)	31 (88)	30 (86)	29 (84)	29 (84)	30 (86)	30 (86)	29 (84)	31 (87)
Mean daily minimum °C (°F)	20 (68)	20 (68)	21 (70)	23 (73)	24 (75)	25 (77)	24 (75)	24 (75)	24 (75)	23 (73)	22 (72)	21 (70)	23 (73)
Average precipitation mm (inches)	7 (0.3)	7 (0.3)	9 (0.4)	21 (0.8)	101 (4.0)	152 (6.0)	188 (7.4)	170 (6.7)	159 (6.3)	115 (4.5)	47 (1.9)	29 (1.1)	1,005 (39.7)
Average rainy days	3.3	3.5	11.1	8.1	18.9	23.5	26.4	25.5	24.5	19.6	10.4	6.4	181.2
Source: Meteoblue

== Demographics ==
Population census of Obando
Year	Pop.	±% p.a.
1903	8,051	—
1918	7,604	−0.38%
1939	10,026	+1.33%
1948	11,957	+1.98%
1960	18,733	+3.81%
1970	27,176	+3.79%
1975	32,378	+3.57%
1980	39,618	+4.12%
1990	46,346	+1.58%
1995	51,488	+1.99%
2000	52,906	+0.58%
2007	56,258	+0.85%
2010	58,009	+1.12%
2015	59,197	+0.39%
2020	59,978	+0.28%
2024	61,073	+0.44%
Source: Philippine Statistics Authority

In the 2024 census, the population of Obando was 61,073 people, with a density of 1,200 inhabitants per square kilometer or 3,100 inhabitants per square mile.

In 2002, Obando had an estimated population of 58,245 wherein 49% were male and 51% were female. Of the current population, about 14% live in rural barangays while the rest constitute the urban population. There are 12,349 households. The average monthly income of a household is ₱9,000.00, slightly below the ₱9,540.00 minimum for a family of 6 threshold set by Department of Social Welfare and Development.

== Economy ==
Poverty incidence of Obando (%)

Source: Philippine Statistics Authority

== Government ==
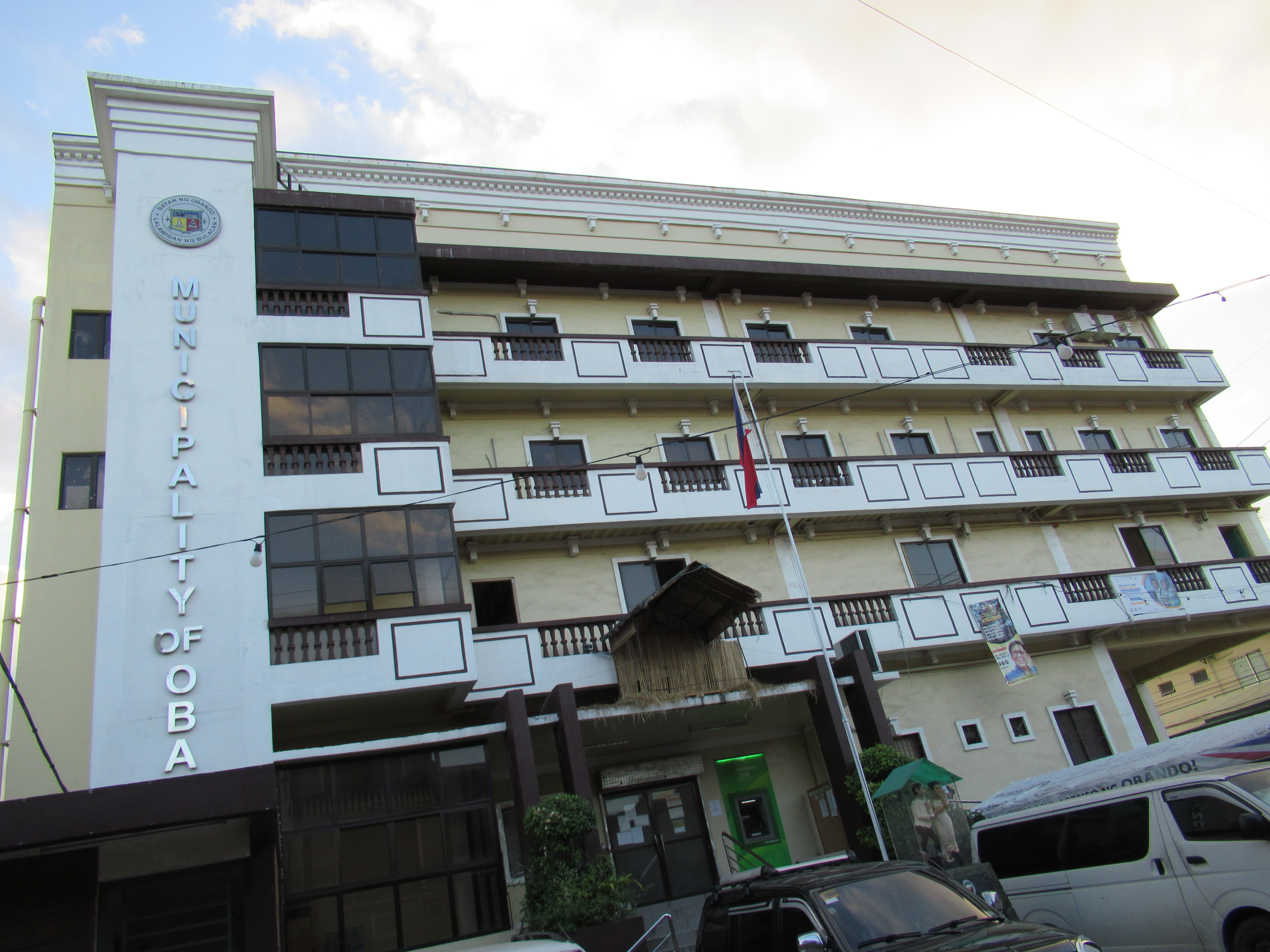
New municipal hall

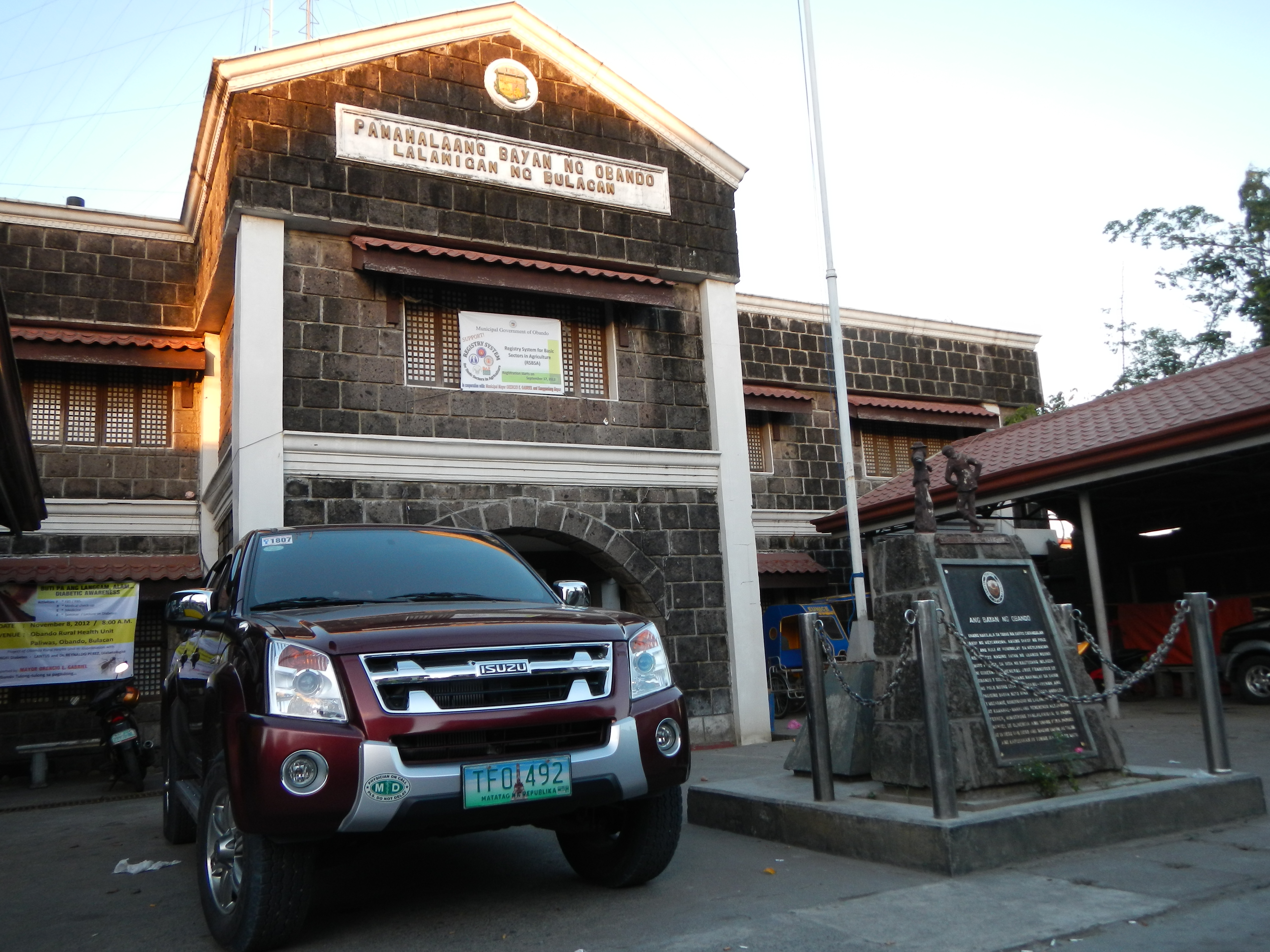
Old municipal hall

=== Elected officials ===
2025-2028 Obando, Bulacan Officials
Position	Name	Party
Mayor	Leonardo d. Valeda	PFP
Vice Mayor	Rowell S. Rillera	PFP
Councilors	Drandren R. De Ocampo	Independent
Councilors	Felipe F. Dela Cruz	PFP
Councilors	Gladys Lyn G. De Leon	PFP
Councilors	Michael L. Dela Paz	PFP
Councilors	Evangeline B. Bautista	PFP
Councilors	Erwin M. Valeda	PFP
Councilors	Lawrence R. Banag	PFP
Councilors	Gerald M. Gomez	PFP
Ex Officio Municipal Council Members
ABC President	TBD	Nonpartisan
SK Federation President	TBD	Nonpartisan

=== List of mayors ===
- Antonio Joaquin (OIC 1986 - 1989)
- Bienvenido Evangelista (1989–1992)
- Conrado Lumabas Jr. (1992–2001)
- Onesimo Joaquin (2001–2004)
- Zoilito Santiago (2004–2007)
- Orencio Gabriel (2007–2013)
- Edwin C. Santos (2013–2022)
- Leonardo Valeda (2022–Present)

=== List of vice mayors ===
Vice Mayors of Obando:

- Remigio Dela Cruz (1988–1992)
- Gaudioso Espinosa (1992–1995)
- Romerico Roque Santos (1995–1998)
- Onesimo Joaquin (1998–2001)
- Zoilito Santiago (2001–2004)
- Jose Correa (2004–2007)
- Leonardo Pantanilla (2007–2010)
- Danilo de Ocampo (2010–2013)
- Zoilito Santiago (2013–2016)
- Arvin Dela Cruz (2016–2025)
- Rowell S. Rillera (2025–Present)

== Education ==
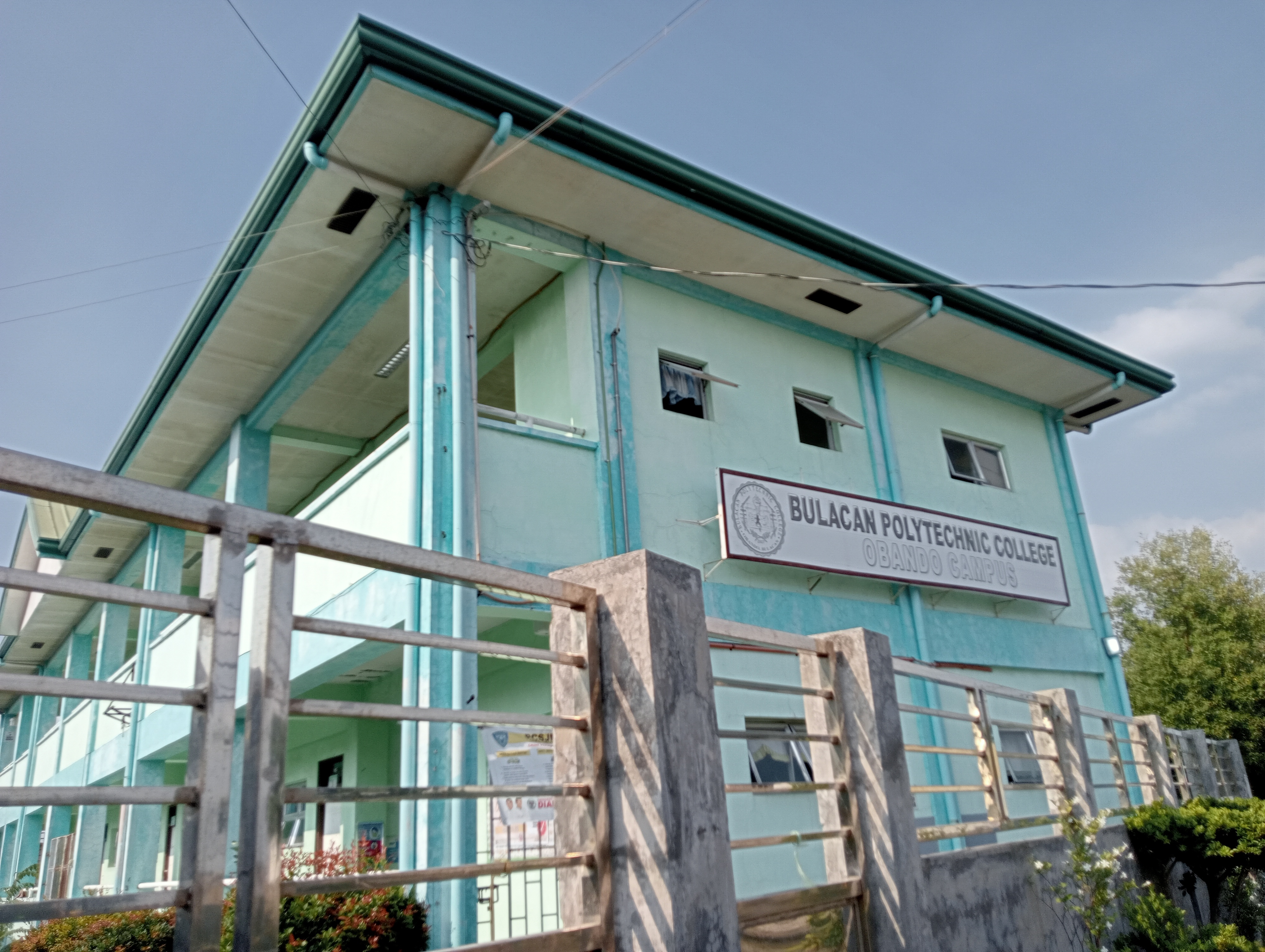
Bulacan Polytechnic College - Obando Campus

The Obando Schools District Office governs all educational institutions within the municipality. It oversees the management and operations of all private and public, from primary to secondary schools.

=== Secondary schools ===
- Obando National High School
- Obando School of Fisheries
- Obando Montessori, Inc
- Riveridge School, Inc
- Lux Mundi Academy, Inc

=== Higher educational institution ===
- Colegio de San Pascual Baylon
- Bulacan Polytechnic College

== Media ==
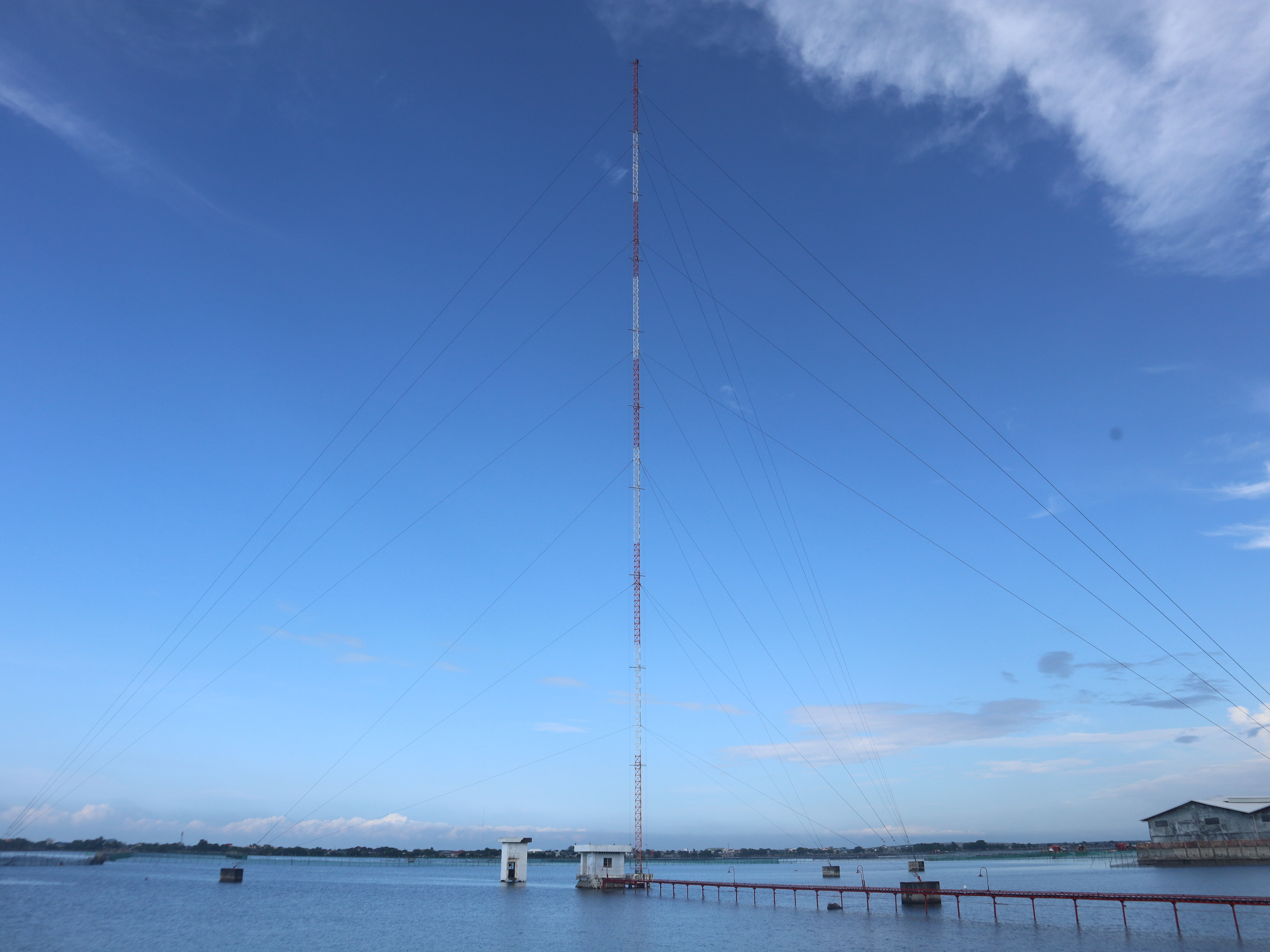
DZBB-AM transmitter

Obando is also the transmitter site of some AM stations, primarily broadcasting the Mega Manila area. Among them are:

- Super Radyo DZBB 594 (GMA Network)
- DWIZ 882 (Aliw Broadcasting Corporation)
- DZMM Radyo Patrol 630 (Philippine Collective Media Corporation/ABS-CBN Corporation)
- DZIQ Radyo Inquirer 990 (Trans-Radio Broadcasting Corporation, defunct)
- DZEC Radyo Agila 1062 (Eagle Broadcasting Corporation)
- INC Radio DZEM 954 (Christian Era Broadcasting Service International)
- DZME 1530 (Capitol Broadcasting Center)

== Gallery ==
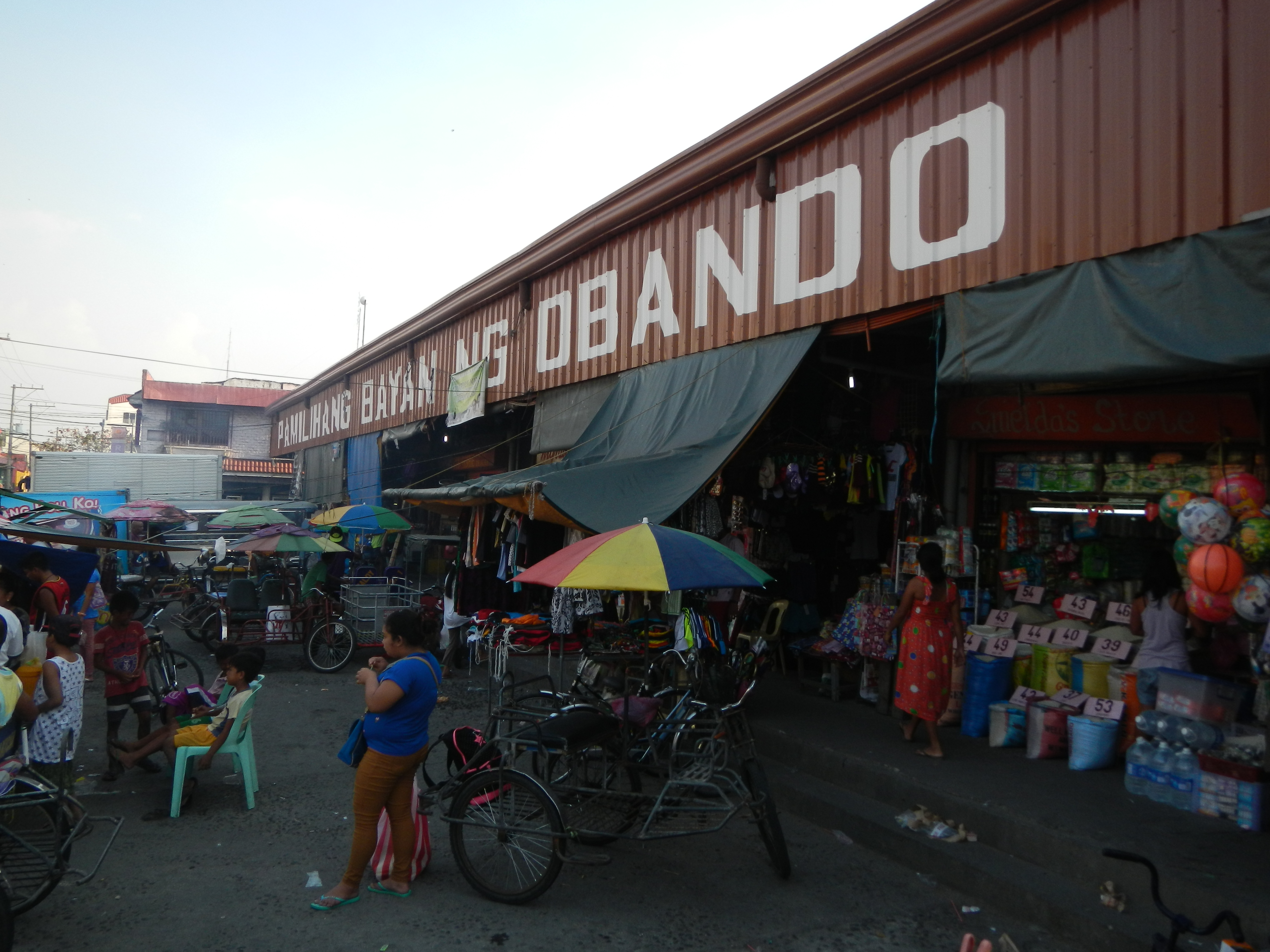
Obando Public Market

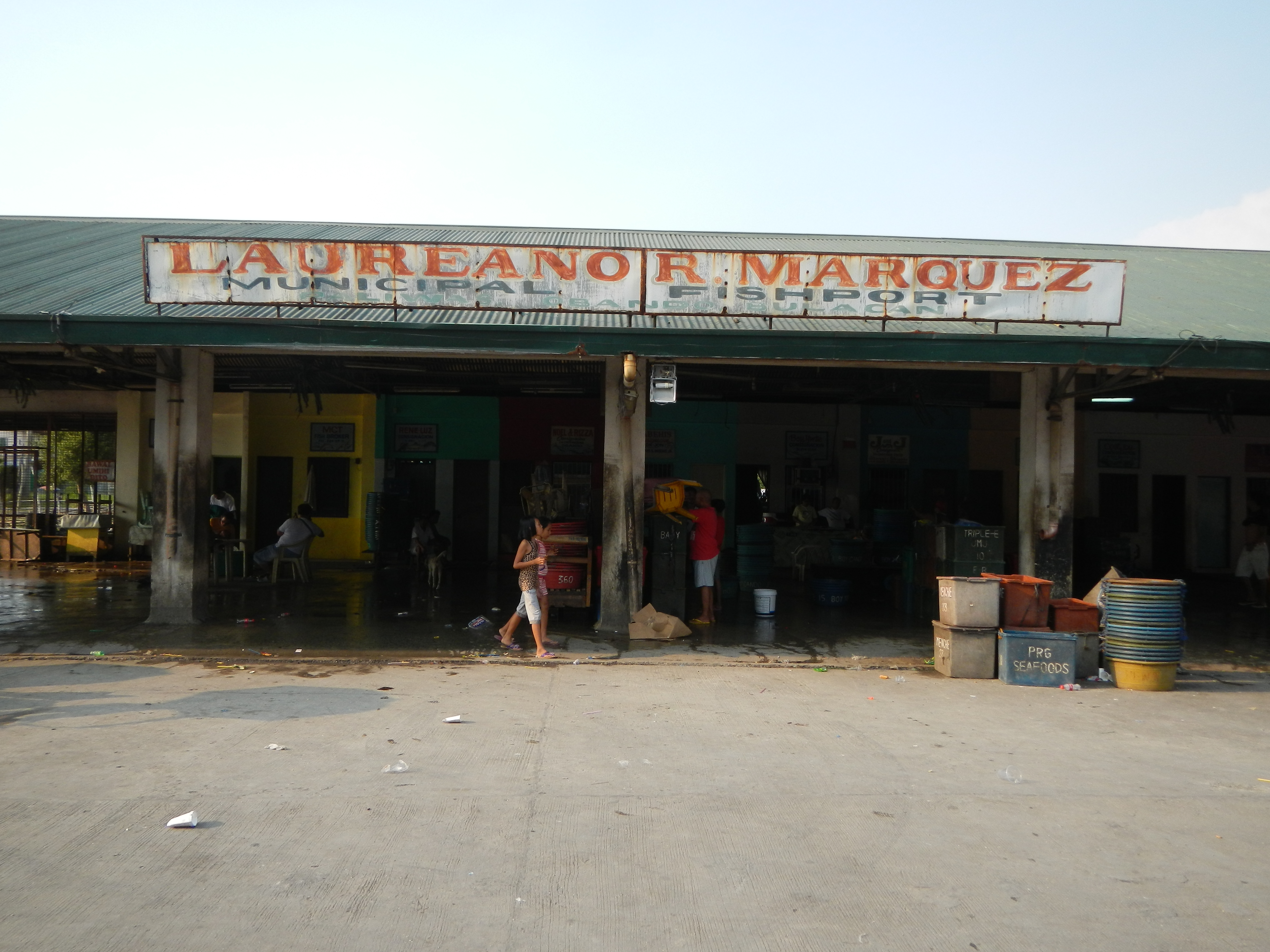
Municipal Fishport

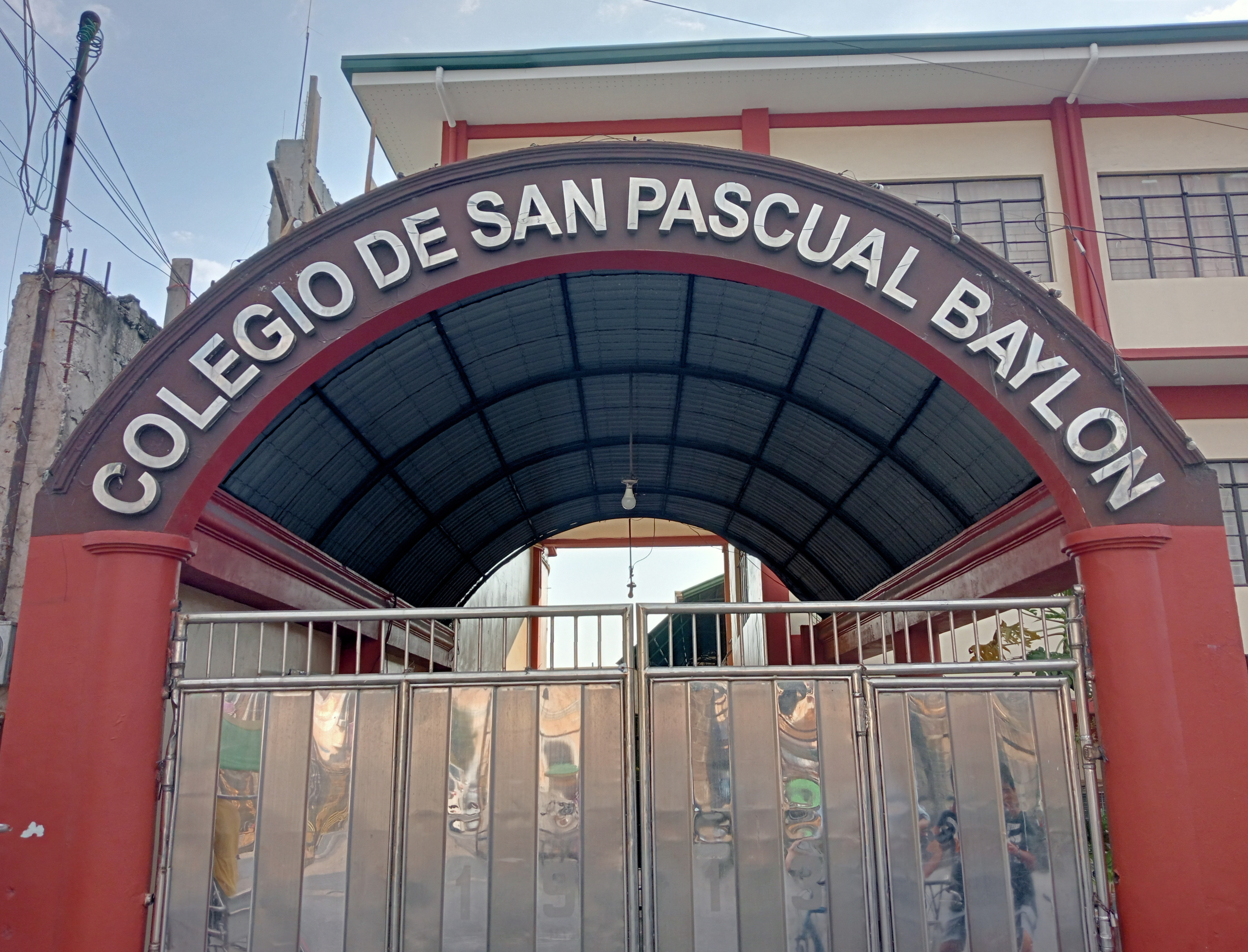
Colegio de San Pascual Baylon

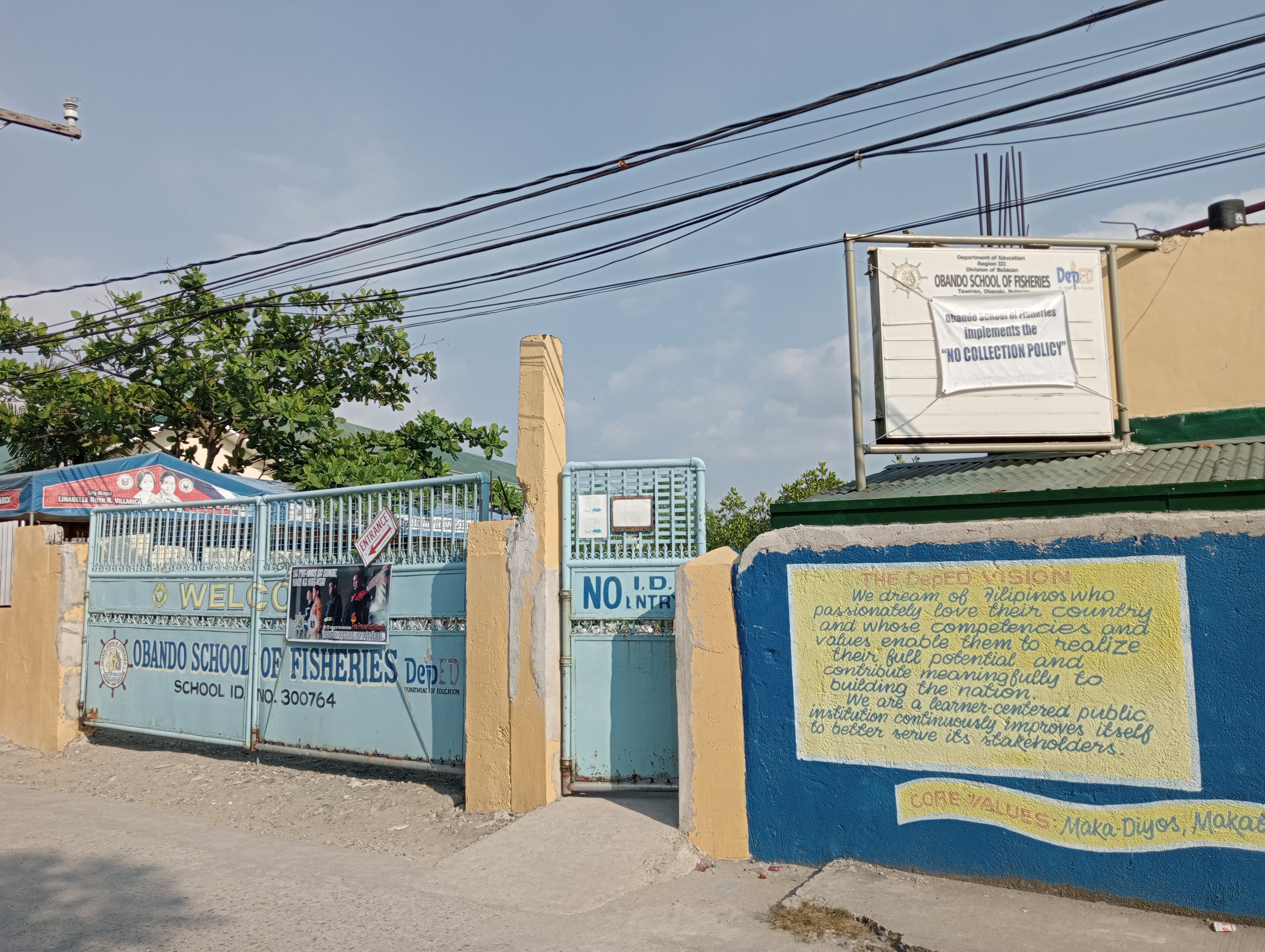
Obando School of Fisheries

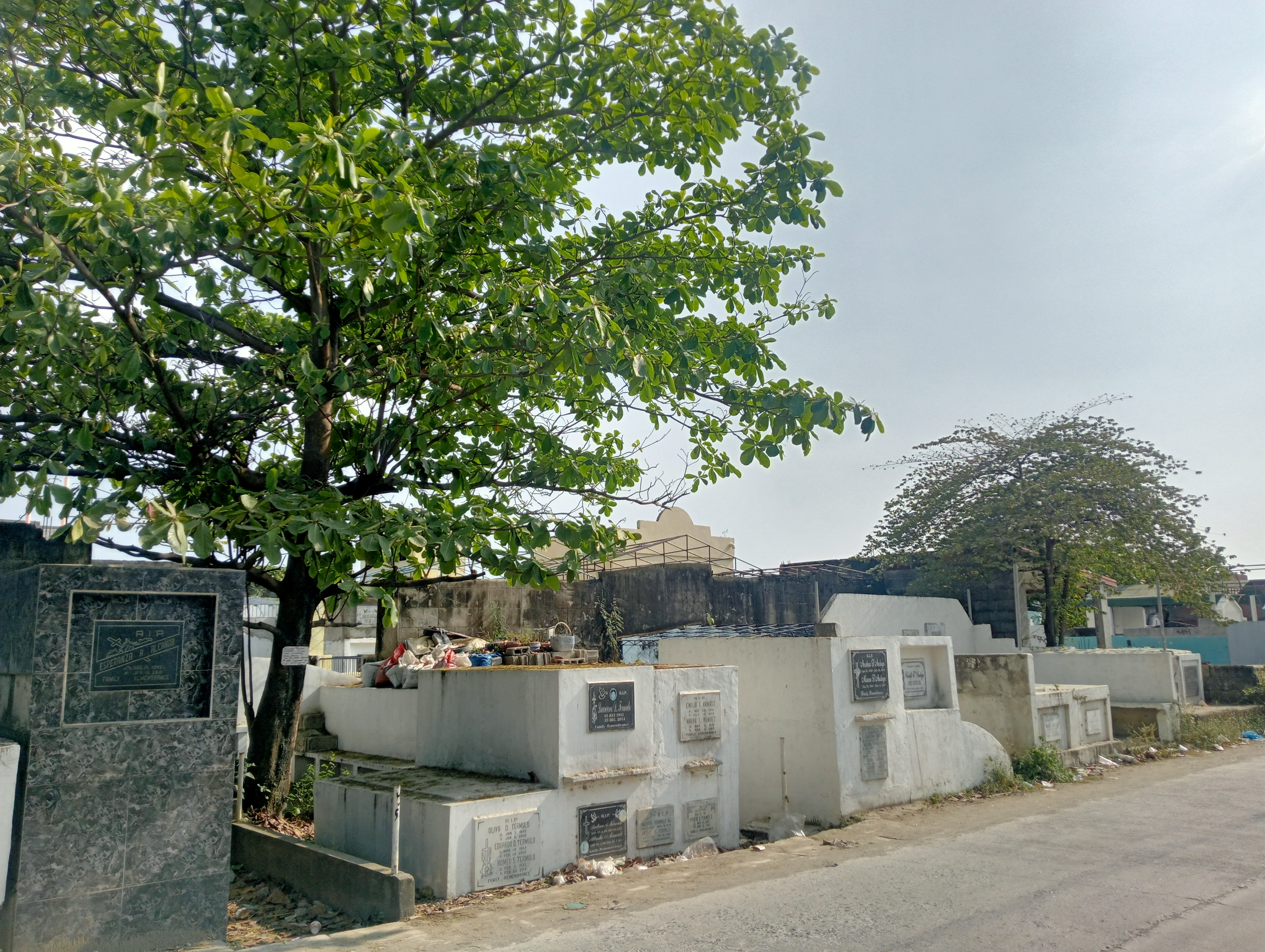
Paco Catholic Cemetery

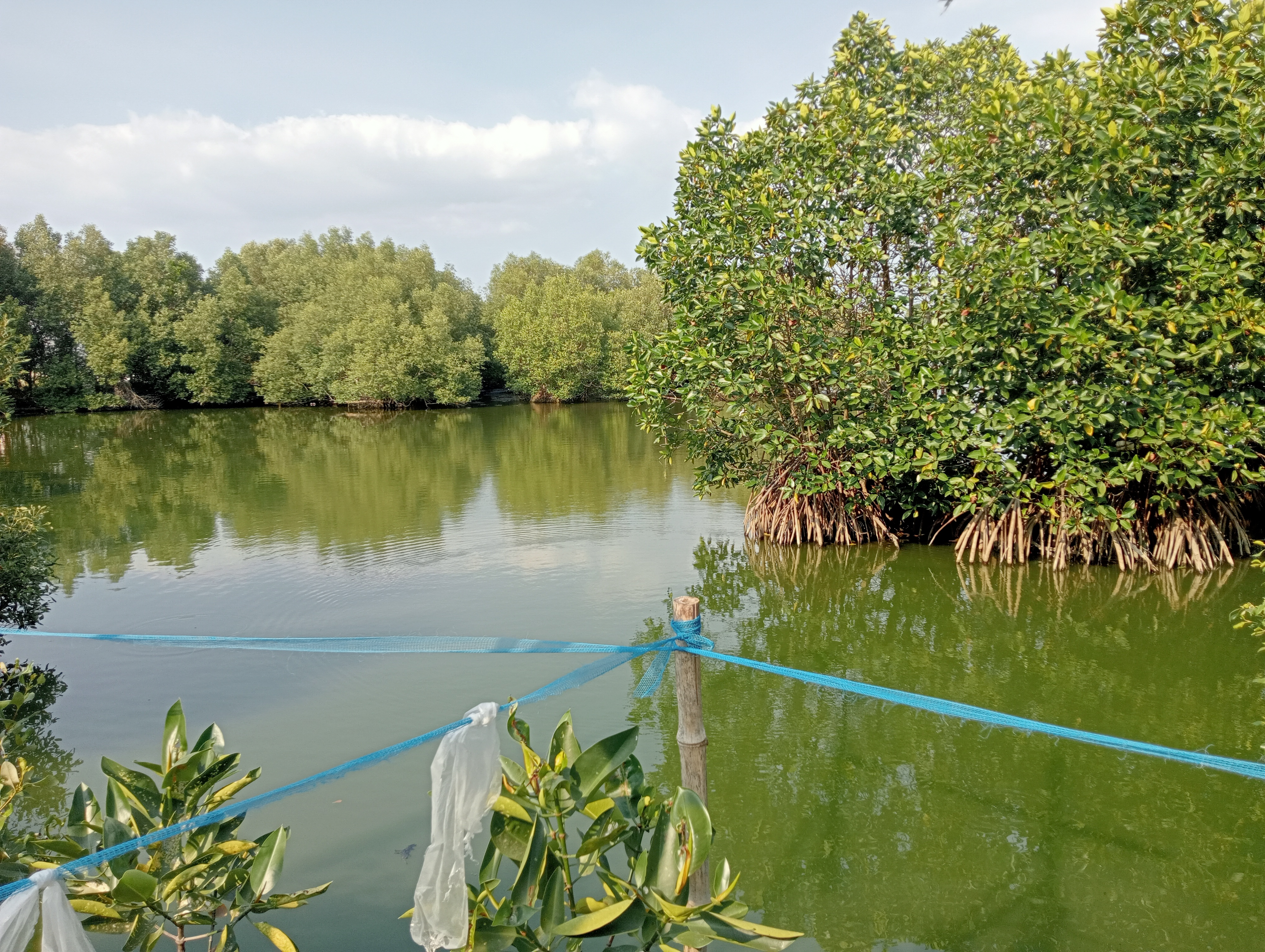
Mangroves beside Paliwas Road

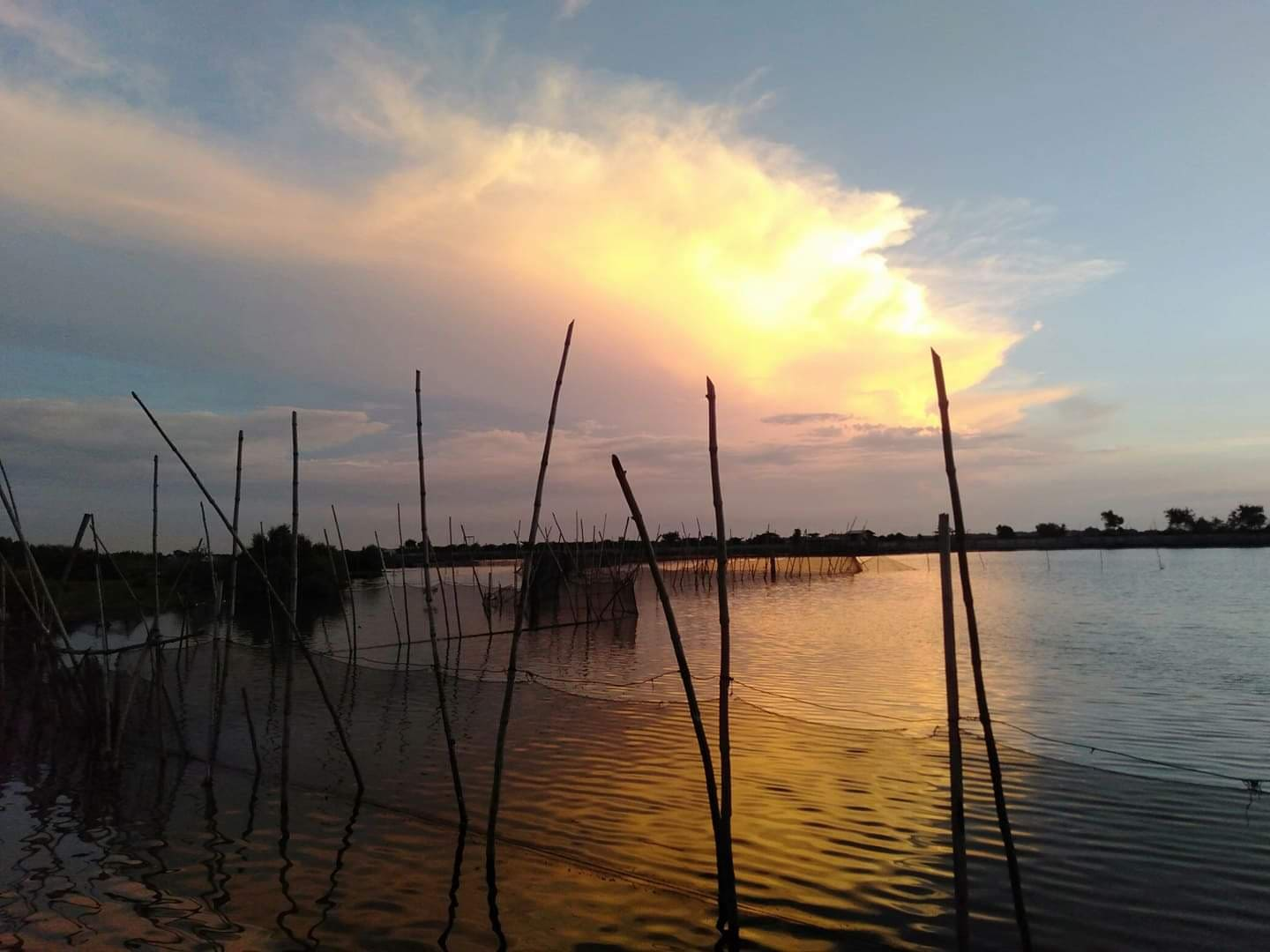
A fish pen in Obando

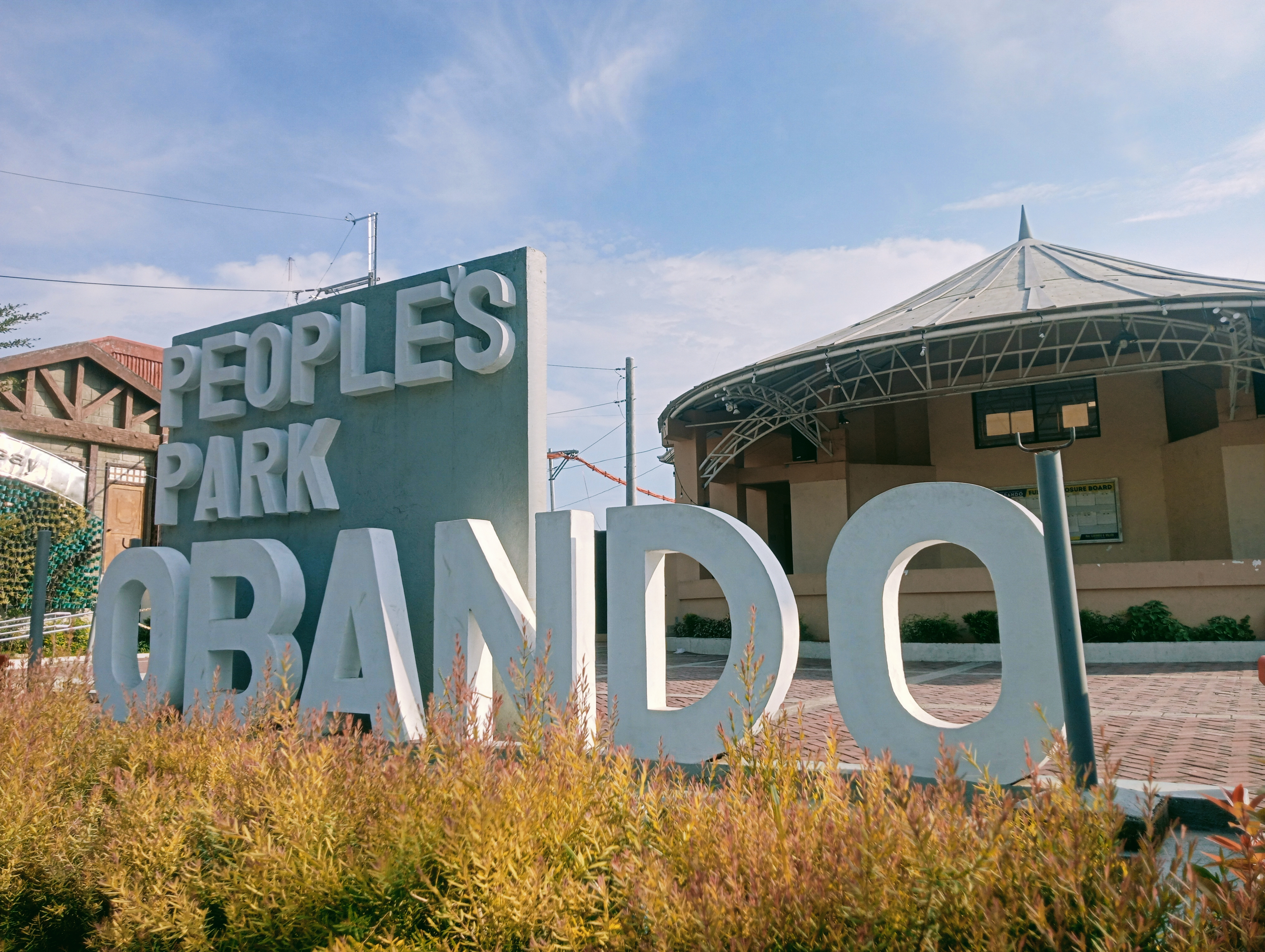
Obando People's Park

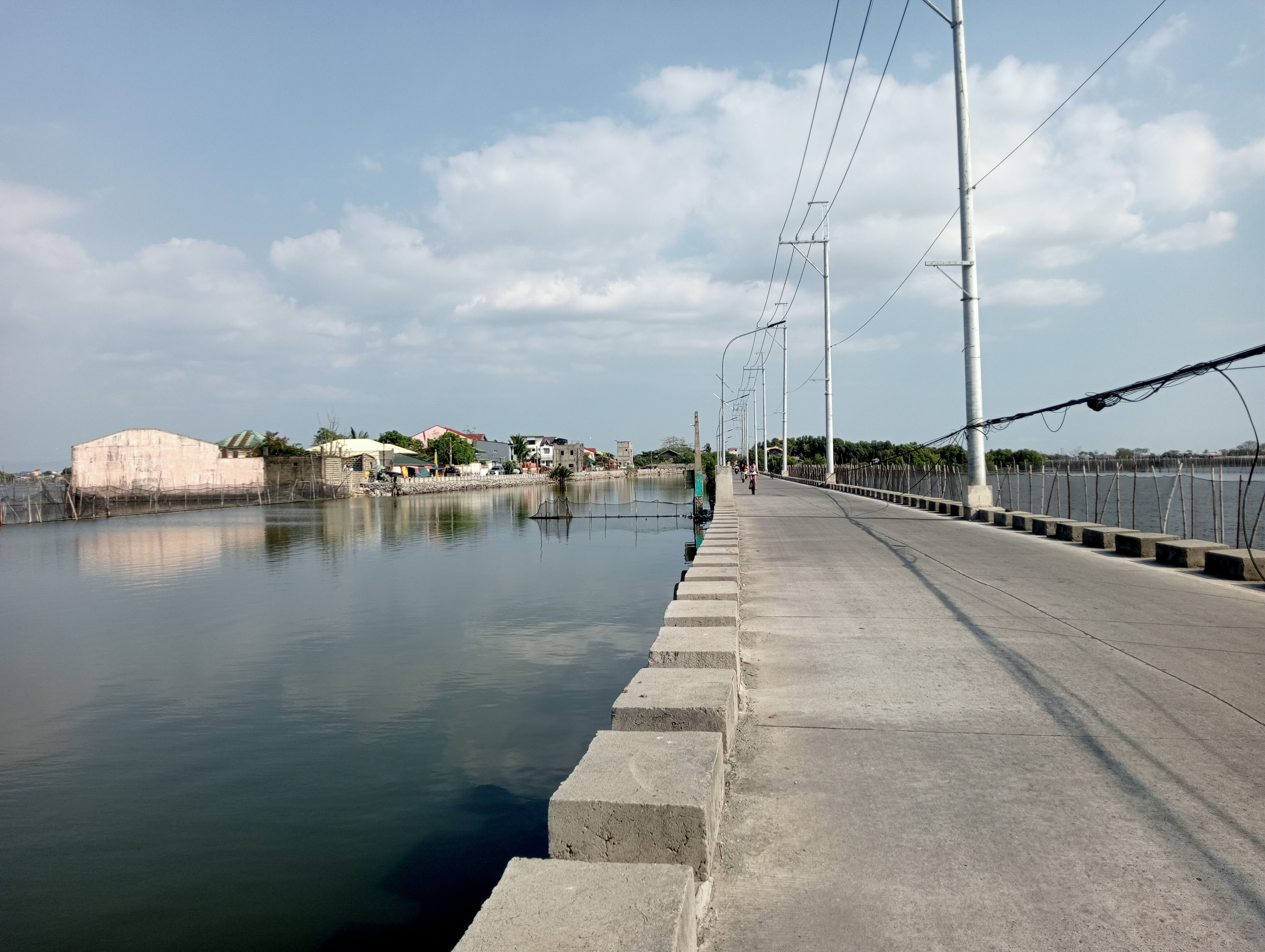
Paliwas Road

== See also ==
- Obando Fertility Rites
- Obando Church
- Colegio de San Pascual Baylon
