= SPIS =

SPIS may refer to:

- Scottish Police Information Strategy, former name of the Scottish Police Services Authority – Information Communications Technology
- Pias Airport (ICAO code), Pias, Peru
- Spiš, a region in north-eastern Slovakia, with a very small area in south-eastern Poland
  - Spiš Castle, one of the largest castle sites in Central Europe
  - Spiš county, an administrative county of the Kingdom of Hungary

== See also ==
- SPI (disambiguation)
