= Sustainable preservation =

Conservation theory

In historic preservation, sustainable preservation is the idea that preservation has tangible ecological benefits, on the basis that the most sustainable building is one that is already built. Historic buildings can have advantages over new construction with their often central location, historic building materials, and unique characteristics of craftsmanship. Arguing for these connections is at least partially an outgrowth of the green building movement with its emphasis on new construction. Sustainable preservation borrows many of the same principles of sustainable architecture, though is unique by focusing on older buildings versus new construction. The term "sustainable preservation" is also utilized to refer to the preservation of global heritage, archaeological and historic sites through the creation of economically sustainable businesses which support such preservation, such as the Sustainable Preservation Initiative and the Global Heritage Fund.

Architect Olaf Grawert has stated the challenges that come with the design of new buildings, especially in the context of the architectural market in Europe, where there has been a 38% increase in the building sector since 2012, but its contribution to global carbon dioxide emissions is also 38%.

== History ==
The U.S. Green Building Council (USGBC) has popularized sustainability initiatives since their founding in 1993. Their LEED certification allowed professionals to develop expertise in the field of green building. The LEED Green Building Rating System with benchmarks was established in 2000.

The Association for Preservation Technology International formed a "Sustainable Preservation Committee" in 2004 to provide an arena for discussion, and educate on the relationship between historic preservation. Among early discussions were a workshop in Halifax, held in 2005. This was followed a workshop on "Greenbuild & LEED for Historic Building" in November 2006. The APTI annual conference in Montreal from October 13–17, 2008, also included a symposium on sustainable heritage conservation.

The National Trust for Historic Preservation also included Sustainability among several issues the Trust works on. The Trust's position statement on sustainability is:

Historic preservation can – and should – be an important component of any effort to promote sustainable development. The conservation and improvement of our existing built resources, including re-use of historic and older buildings, greening the existing building stock, and reinvestment in older and historic communities, is crucial to combating climate change.

National Trust President Richard Moe, addressed the USGBC on November 20, 2008. His speech laid out several principles in an effort to find common ground:

1. Promote a culture of reuse
2. Reinvest at a Community Scale
3. Value the Lessons of Heritage Buildings and Communities
4. Make Use of the Economic Advantages of Reuse, Reinvestment and Retrofits
5. Re-imagine Historic Preservation Policies and Practices as They Relate to Sustainability
6. Take Immediate and Decisive Action

The Kresge Foundation led a Green Building Initiative from 2003 to May 29, 2009. The initiative provided planning grants for nonprofit organizations that went on to build green buildings. The foundation also demonstrated their commitment to sustainability initiatives through construction of a green headquarters in Troy, Michigan. This building incorporated a historic building on the site with new construction. These facilities were completed in 2006, and in 2008 received the Platinum-level rating from the USGBC.

== Notable Projects ==
- Trinity Church, Boston, Massachusetts
- United States Naval Academy, Main Academic Complex, Annapolis, Maryland
- Cambridge City Hall Annex, Cambridge, Massachusetts - in 2005 was the oldest building certified under the USGBC LEED for New Construction, earning the Gold Rating
- Hudson Area Association Library, Hudson, New York
- J.W. McCormack Federal Courthouse and Post Office, Boston, Massachusetts
- Villagra Building, Santa Fe, New Mexico
- William A. Kerr Building, St. Louis, Missouri
- Howard Hall, Athens, New York
- bplus.xyz (b+), Berlin, Germany
