= SPI =

SPI may refer to:

== Businesses ==
- Simulations Publications, Inc., a former US board game publisher
- Sony Pictures Imageworks, a subsidiary of Sony specializing in computer animation
- Stream Processors, Inc, a semiconductor company

== Organizations ==
- Indian Protection Service, a former Brazilian agency whose Portuguese name (Brazil's native language) is Serviço de Proteção ao Índio
- Sisters of Perpetual Indulgence, an LGBT activism movement
- Society for Philosophical Inquiry, a non-profit organization devoted to propagating a version of Socratic inquiry
- Society of the Plastics Industry, an American trade association
- Software in the Public Interest, an American non-profit organization dedicated to the creation and distribution of free open-source software
- Software Patent Institute, an American non-profit organization assisting in obtaining software patents
- St. Pascual Institution, a former name of a school in the Philippines (now named Colegio de San Pascual Baylon)
- St. Paul's Institution, a school in Malaysia
- Sustainable Preservation Initiative, of cultural heritage
- Sveriges Pensionärers Intresseparti, or Swedish Senior Citizen Interest Party
- Social Progress Imperative, a US-based nonprofit created in 2012

== Computing ==
- SCSI Parallel Interface, a suite of standards for inter-connecting electronic devices
- Serial Peripheral Interface, the de facto standard for serial communication
- Security Parameter Index in IPSec tunneling
- Server Programming Interface, an API for PostgreSQL to run SQL queries from the C programming language
- Service provider interface, an API for Java
- Software Process Improvement, an approach to software development initiated by the Data & Analysis Center for Software
- System Packet Interface, a set of specifications for transferring data in computing applications
- Stateful Packet Inspection a type of firewall used in network computing

== Other uses ==
- Schedule Performance Index, a figure of merit used in earned value management
- Single-point injection, an obsolete method of injecting fuel into an internal combustion engine
- Social Progress Index of countries
- Abraham Lincoln Capital Airport (IATA code), US
- Sediment Profile Imagery, a technique for underwater photography of the interface between the seabed and the overlying water
- South Padre Island, a resort town in Cameron County, Texas
- Spi-calculus (Synchronous π-calculus), a proposed extension of π-calculus
- Superintendent of Public Instruction, a state-level official in the United States who is responsible for public education (all states have such an official, but some states have a slightly different title for the position)
- Swiss Performance Index, one of the indecies used to measure the performance of the SIX Swiss Exchange

== See also ==
- SPI 200 futures contract, Australian index
- Spy (disambiguation)
