= CSPB =

CSPB may refer to the following:

- California State Personnel Board, one of California's state constitutional offices
- Credit Suisse Private Banking, a financial services company in Zurich, Switzerland.
- Colegio de San Pascual Baylon, a college in Obando, Bulacan, Philippines.
- Crux Sancti Patris Benedicti ("The Cross of the Holy Father Benedict") found on the Saint Benedict Medal
