= Triduum =

Religious observance lasting three days

A triduum (/ˈtrɪd.juəm, ˈtrɪdʒuəm/; pl. tridua) is a religious observance that lasts three days.

== Paschal Triduum ==
- Day 1: Holy Thursday evening → Good Friday evening
- Day 2: Good Friday evening → Holy Saturday evening
- Day 3: Holy Saturday evening → Easter Sunday evening

== Major tridua ==
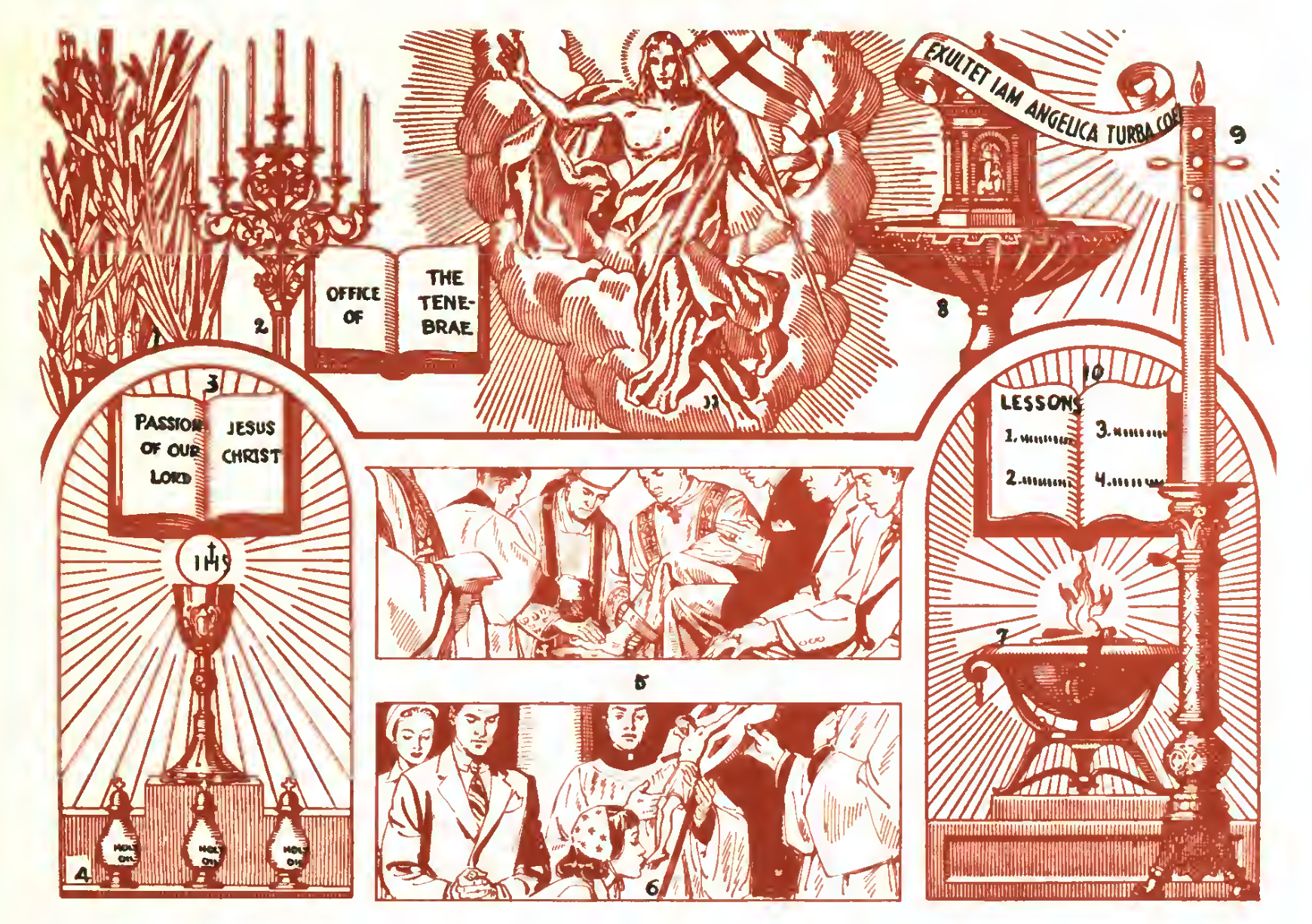
Illustrations of various Catholic observances of the Paschal Triduum, including (2) the candles of Tenebrae services; (3) the reading of the Passion narrative; (6) the veneration of the cross; (7) the blessing of fire; (8) the blessing of baptismal water; (9) the Paschal candle; (10) the reading of the Four Lessons; (11) the commemoration of the Resurrection.

The best-known and most significant example today is the liturgical Paschal Triduum (the three days from the evening of Maundy Thursday to Easter Sunday). Other liturgical tridua celebrated in Western Christianity include the Rogation Days preceding Ascension Thursday, the feasts of Christmas and Pentecost together with the first two days of their octave, and Allhallowtide that lasts from Halloween to All Souls Day.

In Eastern Christianity (both Orthodox and Catholic) the analogues of festive tridua take the form of a major feasts followed by an associated Synaxis. The most publicly celebrated examples are the feast of Epiphany together with its eve and the following day dedicated to Saint John the Baptist, and the Nativity feast with Christmas Eve and the Synaxis of Theotokos. In Spain, tridua are celebrated in honor of each sacred image, for instance, a brotherhood has a fixed date of tridua in honor of their Christ or Virgin.

Ecclesiastical approval has been granted for tridua in honour of the Trinity, the Eucharist and Saint Joseph. Tridua are also celebrated on the local level, often preceding the feasts of patron saints of parishes and localities. An example would be the Obando Fertility Rites in the Philippines, which commemorate Saint Paschal Baylon, Saint Clare of Assisi (in addition to her actual feast day), and Our Lady of Salambáo for three consecutive days in mid-May.

== Other occasions ==
Many other tridua are celebrated on occasions such as when children are preparing for their First Communion; among pupils as well as seminarians at the beginning of the school year; and in religious communities for those who are preparing to renew their vows annually or every six months.

== Historical tridua ==
A triduum was held in Limerick in 1867 in honor of Our Lady of Perpetual Succour, at which the associated icon was first displayed for public veneration in Ireland.

In January of 1915, a number of German cities observed a triduum of meditation on World War I, an event which was influential on a young Martin Heidegger.

James G. McGarry, a Catholic priest and professor, organized a 1977 triduum observance at Knock Shrine.

== See also ==
- Allhallowtide
- Holy Week
- Holy Week procession
- Novena, Octave (liturgy)
