= Obando Church =

Roman Catholic church in Bulacan, Philippines

- San Pascual Baylón Parish and National Shrine of Nuestra Señora de la Immaculada Concepción de Salambáo
- Parokya ni San Pascual Baylón at Pambansáng Dambana ng Mahál na Birhen ng Kalinís-linisang Paglilihî ng Salambáo (Filipino); Santuario Nacional de Nuestra Señora de la Inmaculada Concepción de Salambáo (Spanish)
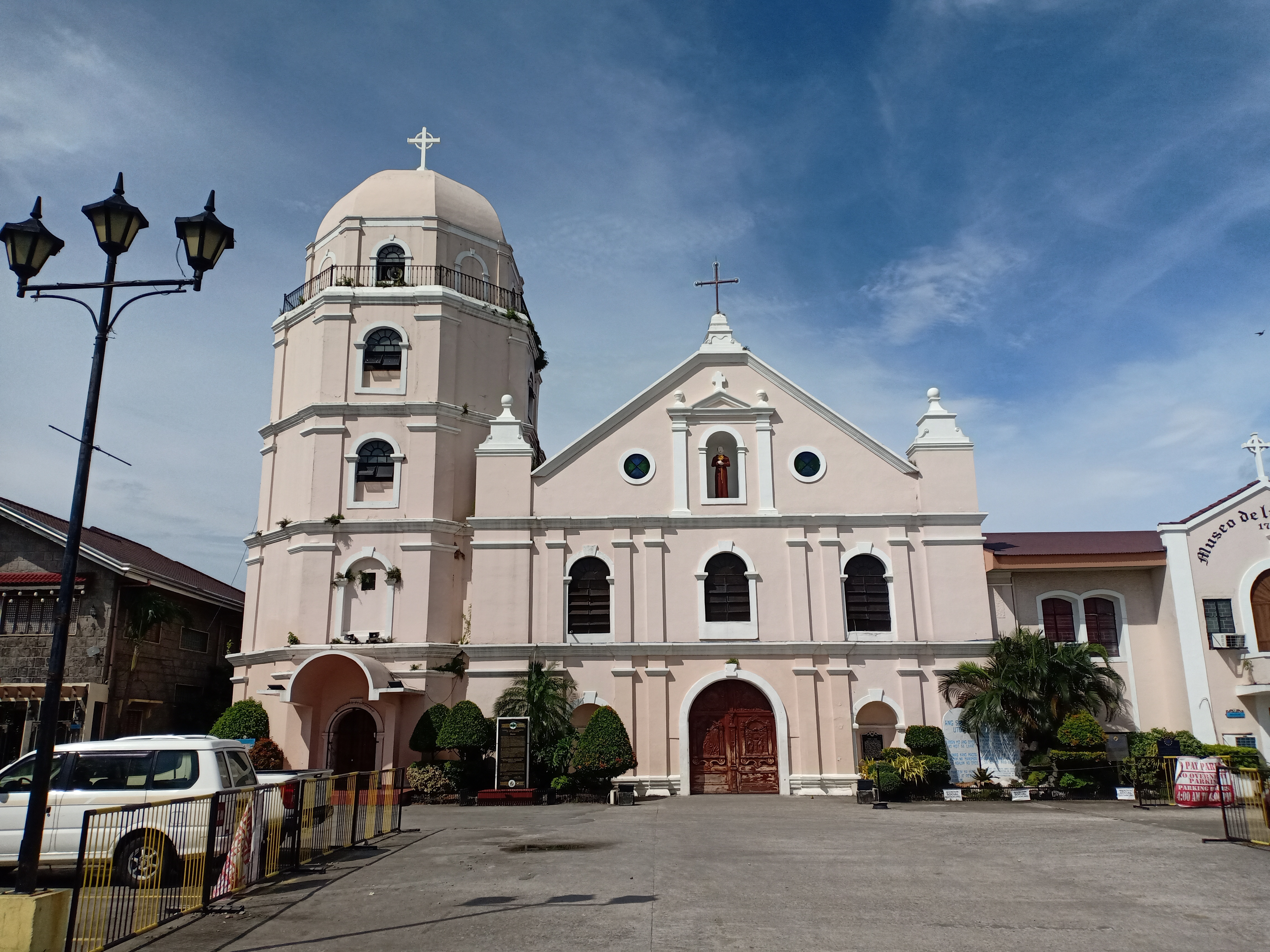
- The main facade in August 2023

- Location in Bulacan Location in Luzon Location in the Philippines
- 14°42′38″N 120°56′13″E
- Location: Obando, Bulacan
- Country: Philippines
- Denomination: Roman Catholic

History
- Former name: San Pascual Baylón Parish-Diocesan Shrine of Nuestra Señora de la Immaculada Concepcion de Salambao
- Status: Parish church and National Shrine
- Founded: April 29, 1754
- Founder: Fray Manuel De Olivencia
- Dedication: Paschal Baylon
- Events: Obando Fertility Rites

Architecture
- Functional status: Active
- Architectural type: Church building
- Completed: 1947

Administration
- Province: Bulacan
- Diocese: Malolos
- Deanery: St. Francis of Assisi
- Parish: St. Paschal Baylon

Clergy
- Priest: Rev. Fr. Proceso Espiritu

The San Pascual Baylón Parish and National Shrine of Nuestra Señora de la Immaculada Concepción de Salambáo, commonly known as Obando Church, is a Roman Catholic church located in the municipality of Obando in the province of Bulacan, Philippines. It is under the jurisdiction of the Diocese of Malolos.

Founded by Franciscan missionaries, under the Spanish Empire, it is the venue of the three-day Obando Fertility Rites held annually in honor of three patron saints, namely: St. Pascual Baylon, St. Claire of Assisi and Our Lady of Salambao. The Rites are mentioned by José Rizal, the Philippine national hero, in chapter 6 of his Spanish-language novel Noli Me Tángere. Every May, parishioners and pilgrims perform the three-day Obando Dance (formerly known as the Kasilonawan, now called Sayáw sa Obando, literally "the dance in Obando") inside the church, followed by a street procession.

== History ==
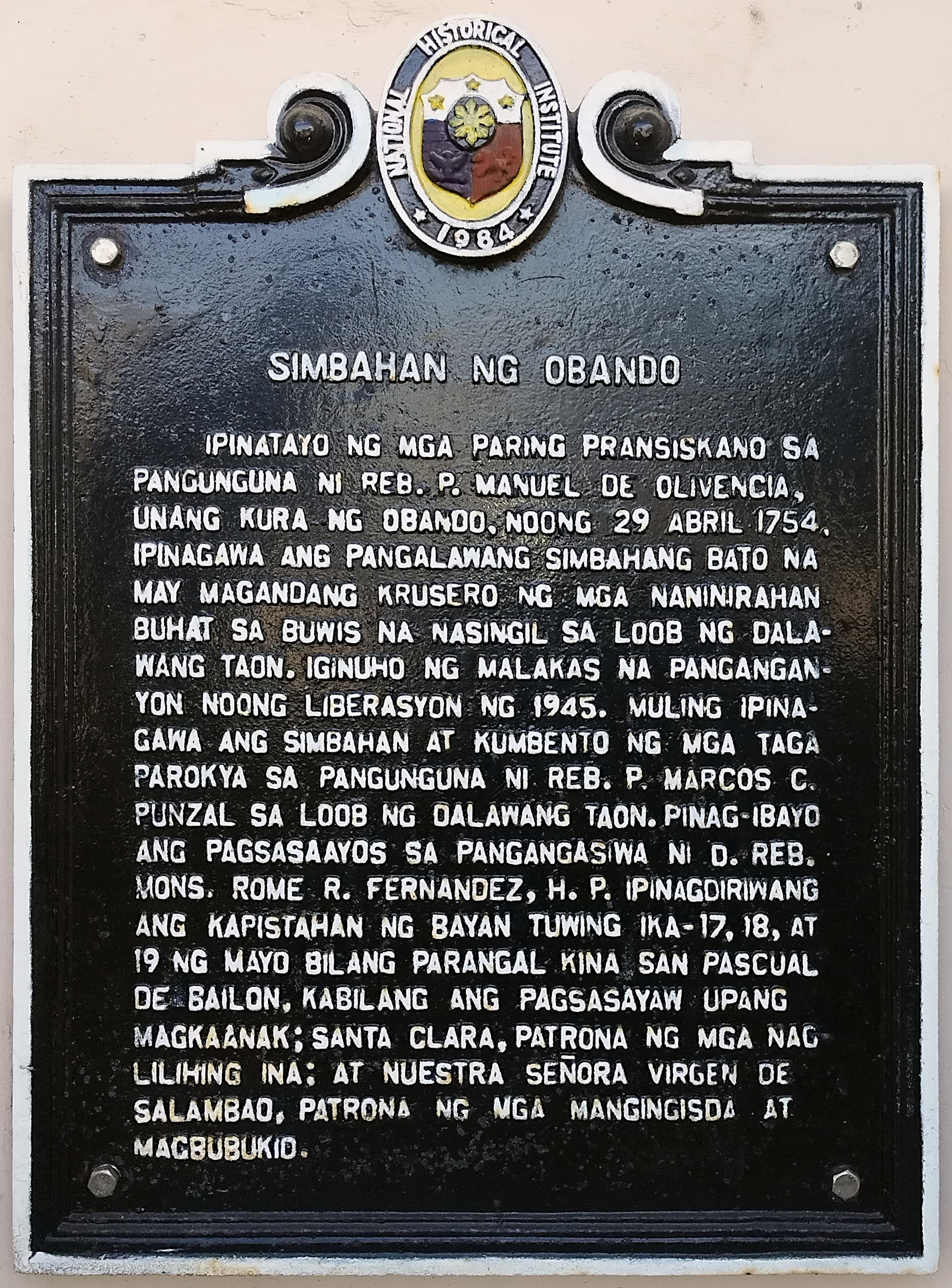
Church NHI historical marker installed in 1984

The Obando Church was built by the Franciscans, headed by Rev. Fr Manuel de Olivencia, the first curate of Obando, on April 29, 1754. The church was destroyed in World War II during the fight for the liberation from Japanese occupation. According to some reports, the original statues of Our Lady of Salambao, Saint Clare and Saint Paschal Baylon were also destroyed during the fighting, and the images presently venerated are commissioned replicas. The church was rebuilt in 1947 through the efforts of Rev. Fr Marcos C. Punzal and Obandeño parishioners.

Other parish priests who also managed Obando church since the 1900s include: Rev. Fr. Juan Dilag, Rev. Fr. Padre Exequiel Morelos, Rev. Fr. Ricardo Pulido, Rev. Fr. Marcos Punzal, Rev Msgr. Rome R. Fernández, Rev. Fr. Marcelo K. Sánchez, Rev. Fr. Danilo G. delos Reyes, Rev. Fr. Avelino A. Sampana, and Rev. Fr. Virgilio C. Ramos. It was Rev. Fr. Fernández, with the assistance from the Cultural Commission of Obando, who revived the celebration of the Obando Fertility Rites in 1972 after these were banned after World War II.

== Current status ==
The Church of Obando has been declared as the "Diocesan Shrine" of the Our Lady of the Immaculate Concepcion of Salambao by the Catholic Church on December 1, 2007.

The church is connected to several barangay chapels in Obando, Bulacan, namely Panghulo, Catanghalan, Pag-asa, Paliwas, San Pascual, and Hulo. Two former chapels that now have parochial church statuses: the Santa Cruz Parish in Paco and the Parish of Our Lady of Salambao in Binuangan. Both are still within the political boundaries of present-day town of Obando.

On January 27, 2021, Obando Church was elevated to the rank of National Shrine by the Catholic Bishops' Conference of the Philippines, raising the number of national shrines in the country to 27. The parish church was solemnly declared a National Shrine on March 25, 2022, during a mass presided by Manila Archbishop Jose Advincula.

At present, Obando Church is managed by its parish priest, Rev. Fr. Proceso Espiritu, since his installation in 2021.

== Architecture ==
Its façade had been described as similar to that of the church of Marilao, Bulacan. The edifice is composed of windows and flat columns and has a pediment with a niche and two round windows at the sides. The façade is also flanked by an octagonal bell tower. Connected to its structure is the Colegio de San Pascual Baylon, a private school managed by the parish. The altar of the church is believed to be gilded with silver.

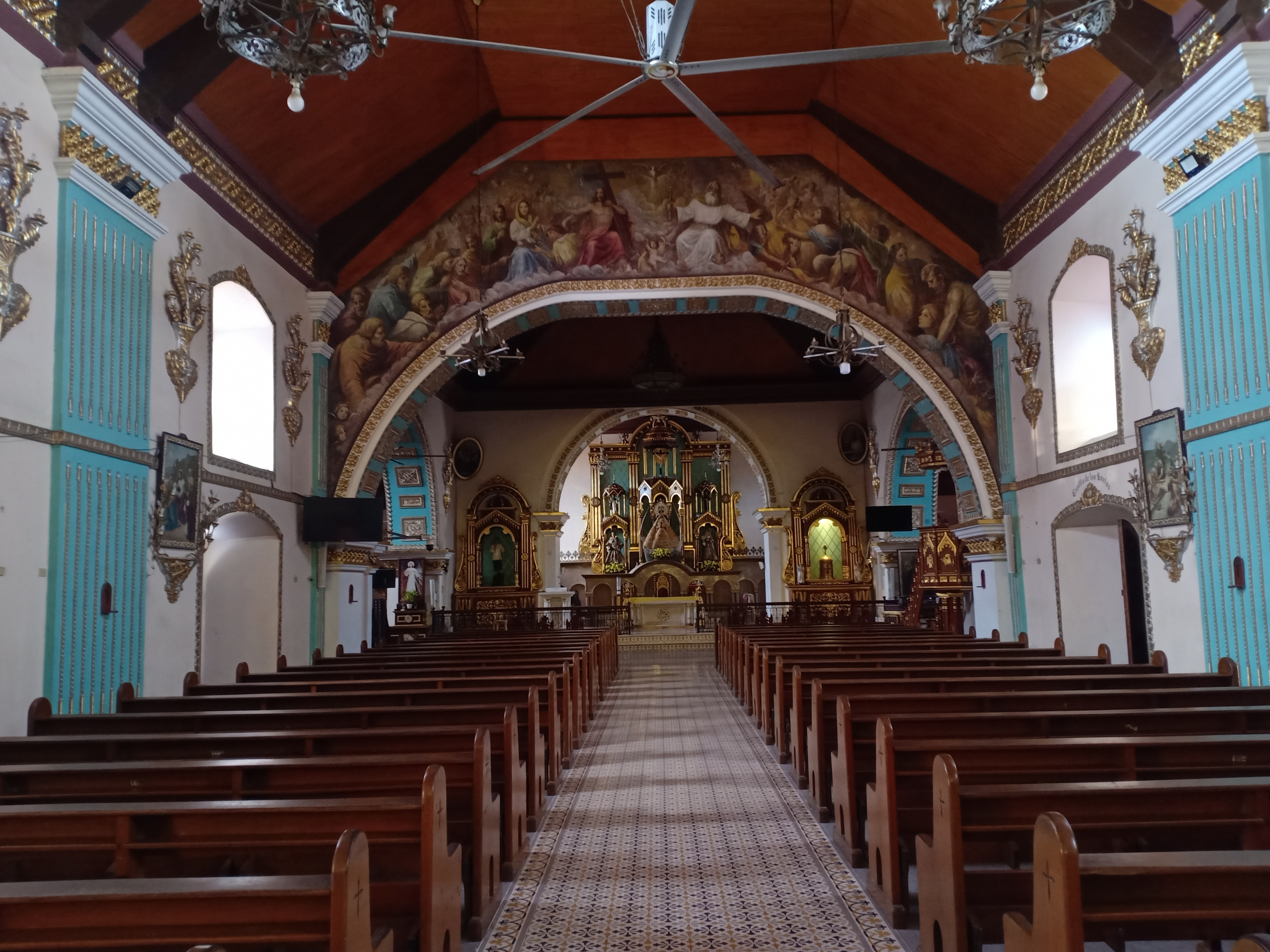
Church interior in 2023

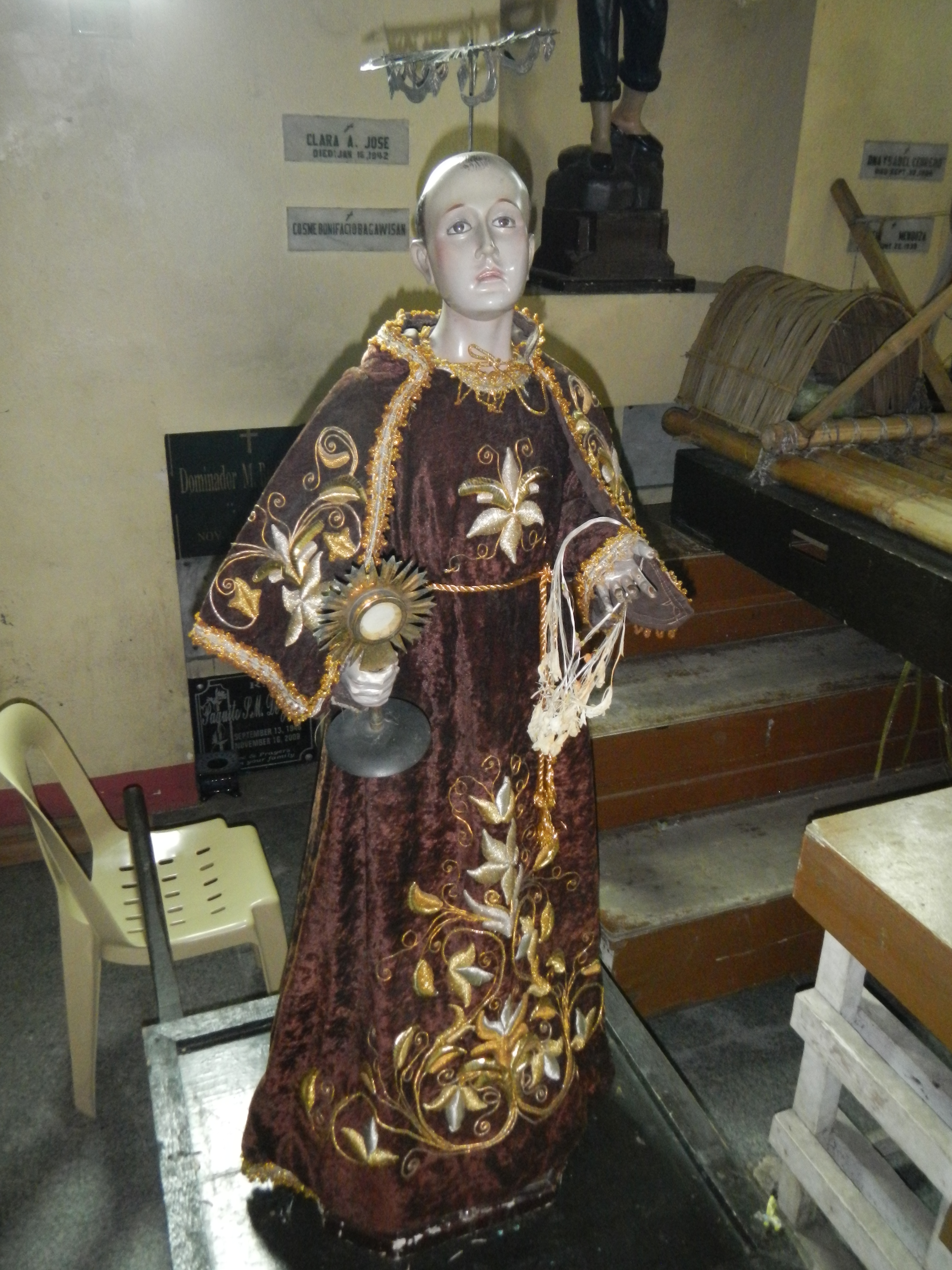
Processional Icon of Paschal Baylon in the Church

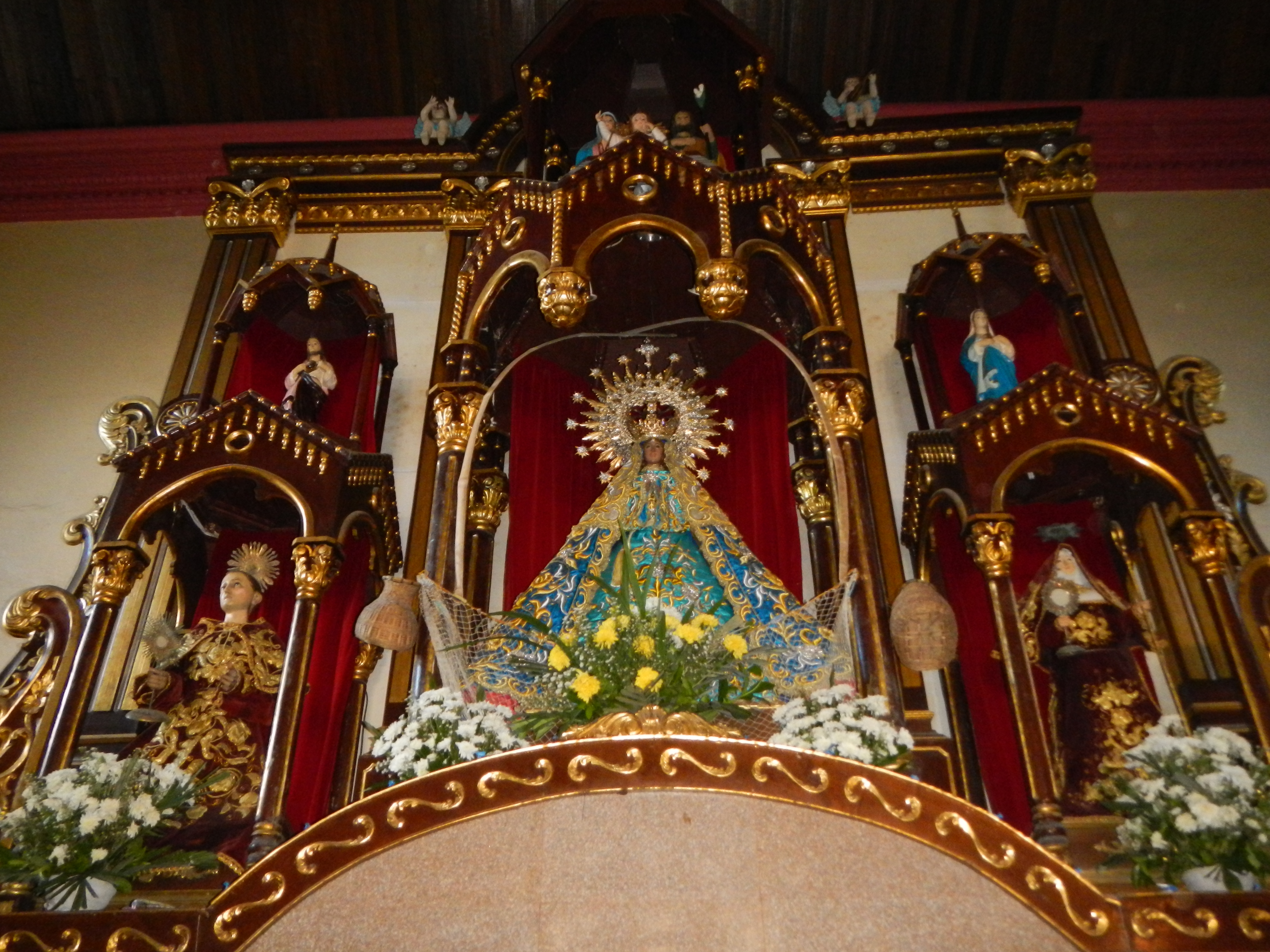
Our Lady of Salambao and saints Baylon (lower left) and Claire of Assisi (lower right) in the altar

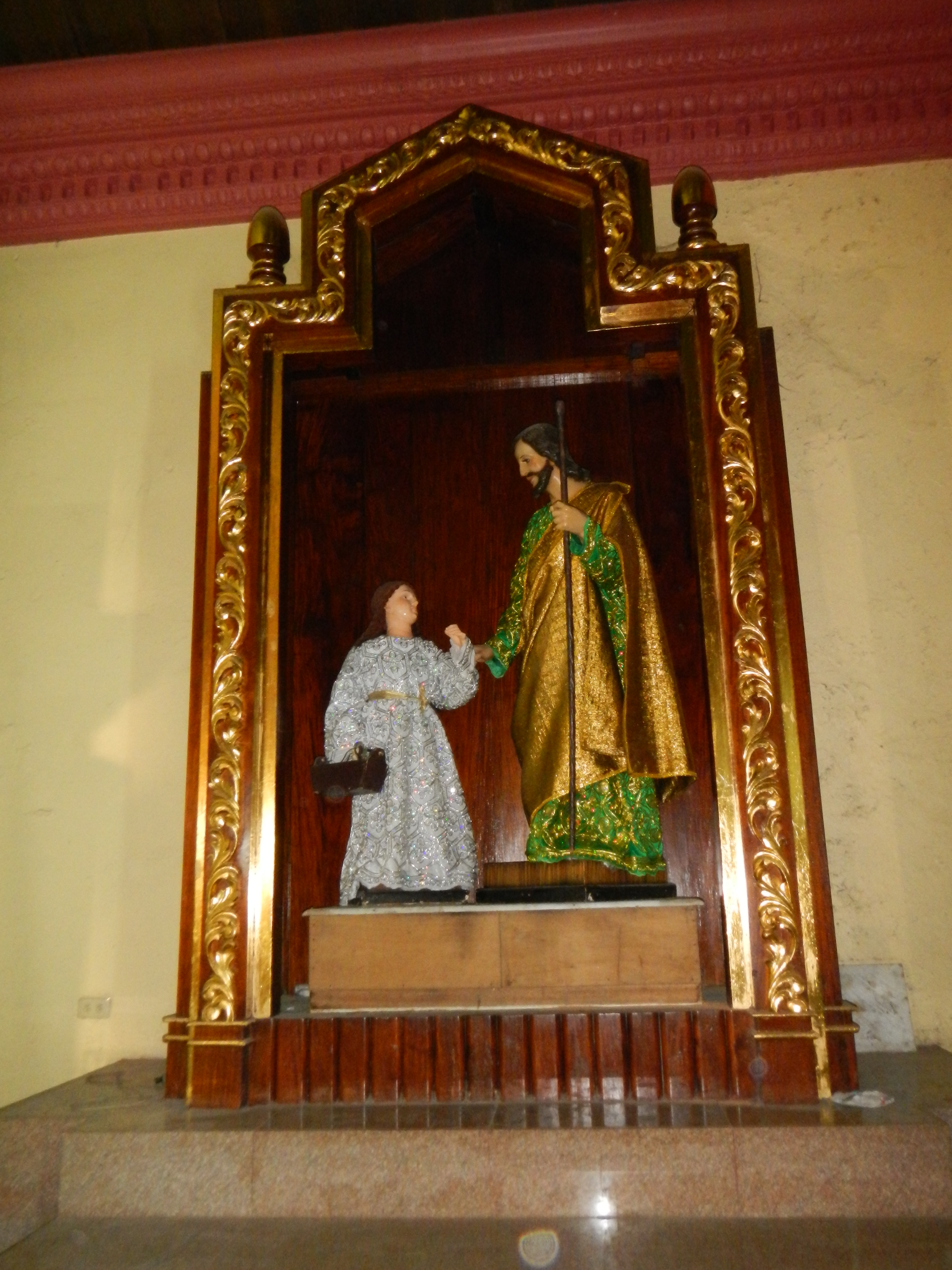
Side altar of St. Joseph and Child Jesus

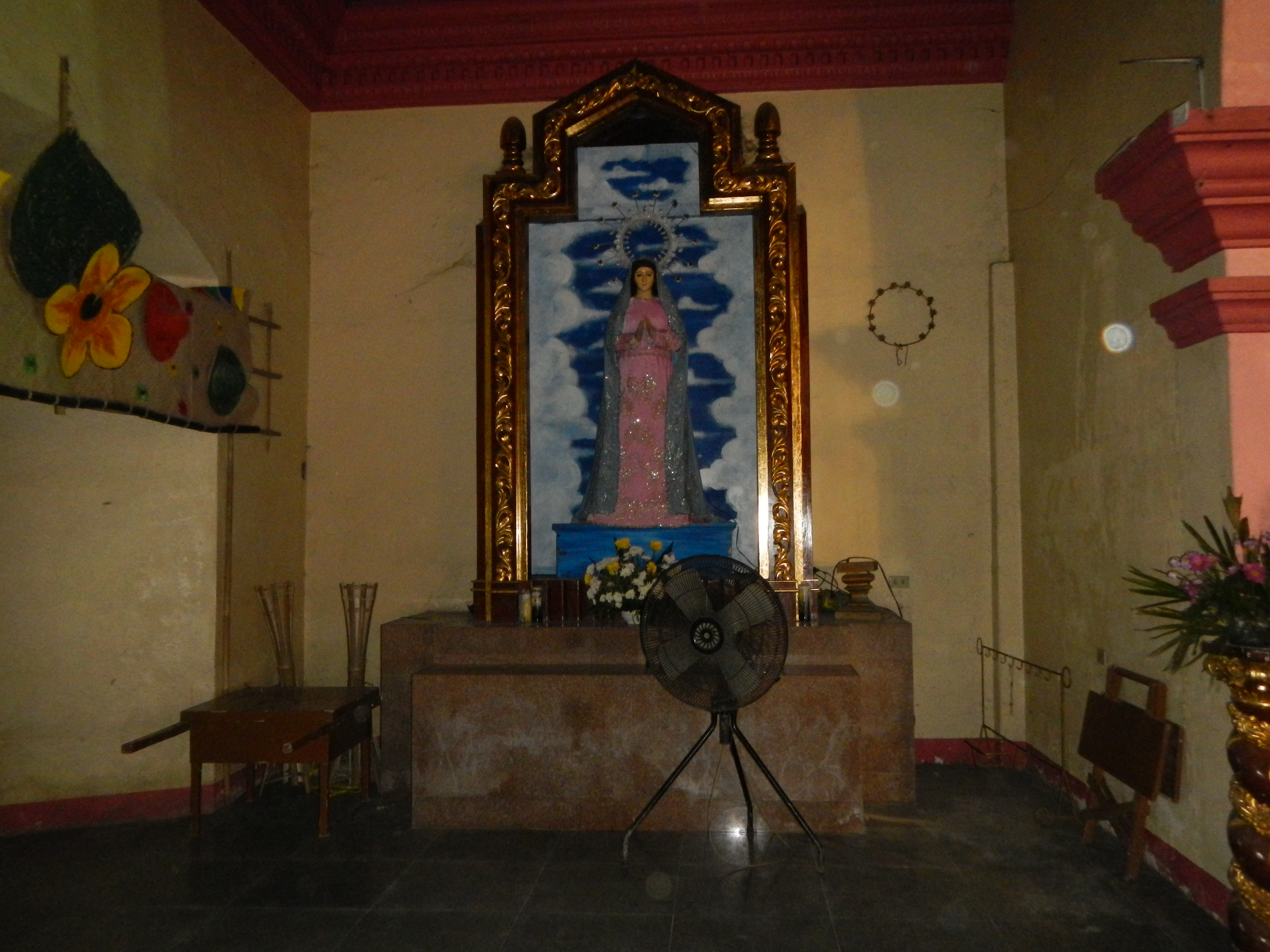
Side altar of the Virgin Mary

== See also ==
- Obando Fertility Rites
- Colegio de San Pascual Baylon
