= Our Lady of Salambao =

Our Lady of The Immaculate Conception of Salambao
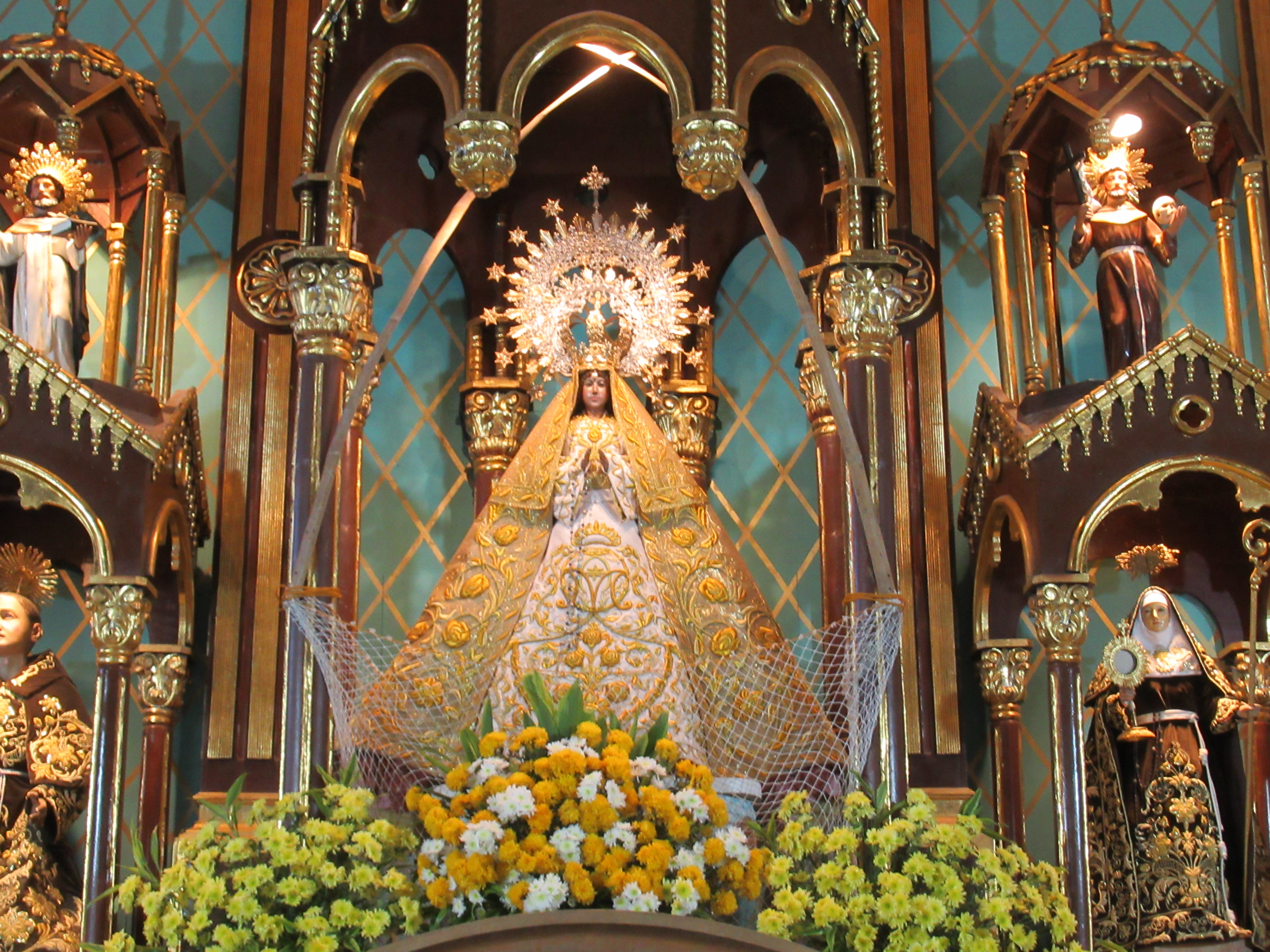
- The image enthroned on the retablo mayor
- Location: Obando, Bulacan, Philippines
- Date: 19 June 1763
- Witness: Juan, Julián, and Diego dela Cruz
- Type: Finding of the image
- Shrine: San Pascual Baylón Parish Church, Obando, Bulacan,

Our Lady of Salambáo (Spanish: Nuestra Señora de la Inmaculada Concepción de Salambáo; Tagalog: Mahal na Birhen ng Salambáo or Birheng ng Salambáw) is a Catholic title of the Blessed Virgin Mary venerated in Obando, Bulacan, Philippines. The Virgin Mary under this title is venerated as the local patroness of fishing, owing to the image's discovery in a salambáw, a type of large lift net supported by bamboo crosspieces and mounted on a raft.

The image is enshrined with Saint Clare of Assisi and Saint Paschal Baylon inside Obando Church. The three saints form a triad that is the focus of the annual Obando Fertility Rites held from 17 to 19 May.

== Legend ==
The date of the image's finding is traditionally held to be 19 June 1763. Three fishermen, named Juan, Julián, and Diego de la Cruz, were fishing at a place known as Hulingduong in the town of Tambobong (now Malabon City). There, they caught the statue within their salambáw, which is a large type of fishing lift net made from bamboo crosspieces and mounted on a raft. When the fishermen tried to bring the Virgin's image to neighbouring Navotas, their salambáw suddenly grew heavy and their boat immobile. They decided to head for Obando, and their raft lightened and became easy to row. This they took as a sign the Virgin wanted to be enshrined in Obando.

The image—complete with a replica salambáw—is now housed in a wooden retablo (reredos) above the high altar of San Pascual Baylón Parish, together with statues of Saint Clare and Saint Paschal. A replica of the statue, in its own salambáw, is used for the annual procession on the final day of the Rites.

== Feast ==
The feast of Our Lady of Salambáo is on 19 May, which is the last day of a triduum honouring the triad of saints. Spread across the triduum are the Rites, which constitute Masses and processions where devotees of both sexes joyfully dance the fandango in supplication for a child and of good livelihood and harvest. The celebrations are centered on the San Pascual Baylón Parish Church, also known as the National Shrine of Nuestra Señora de la Inmaculada Concepción de Salambáo in Barangay Pag-asa, Obando, Bulacan.

== Gallery ==
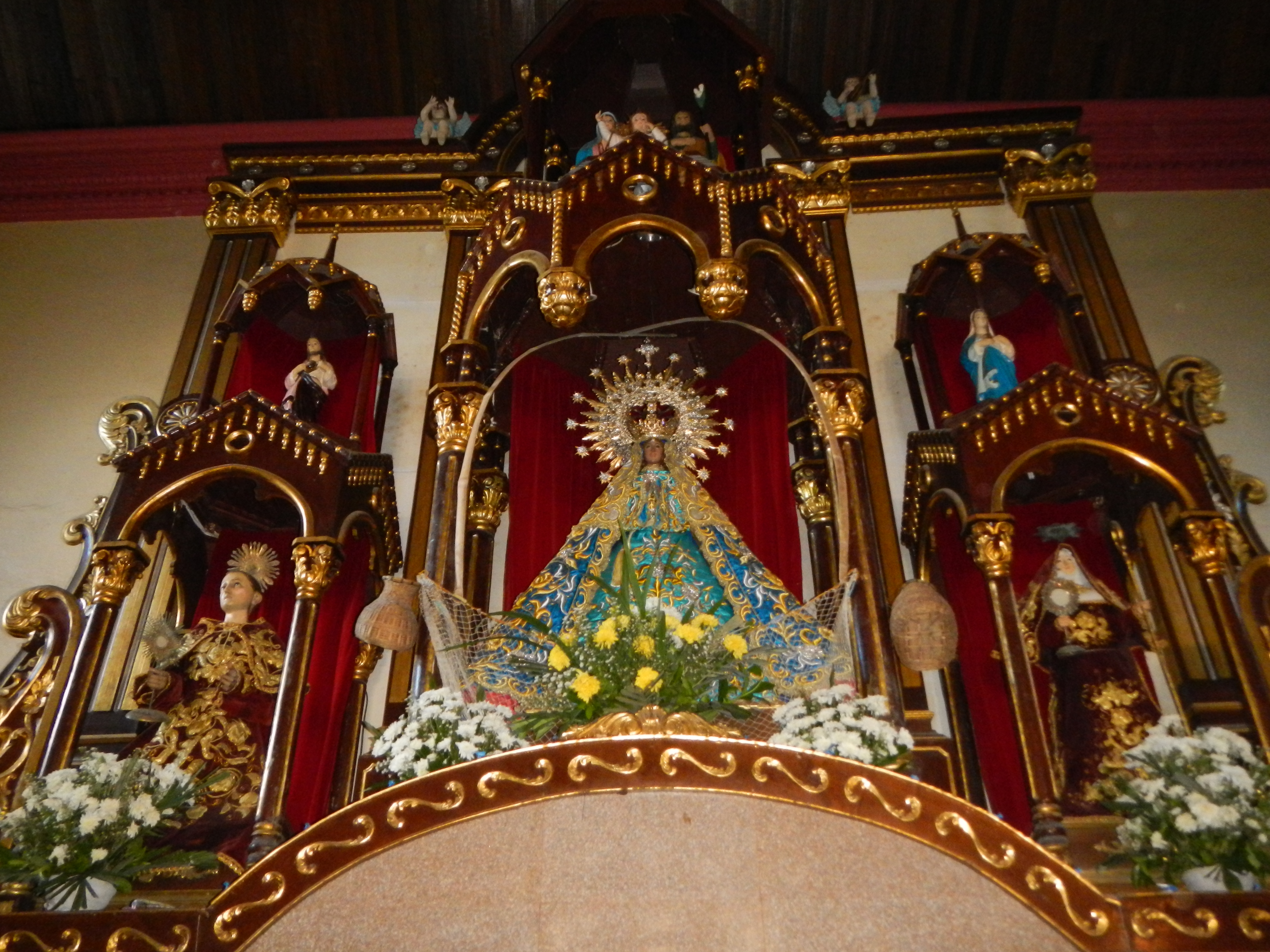
Image of Our Lady of Salambáo in the altar of Obando Church, flanked by St Paschal to her right and St Clare to her left.

Processional Image of Our Lady of Salambao Inside the real Salambaw Lift Net

== See also ==
- Obando Fertility Rites
- Our Lady of Camarin, a statue venerated on Guam that was also found by a fisherman
- Our Lady of Caysasay, which was also found in a fisherman's net

== Sources ==
- Philippine Fiestas & Festivals
- Obando Fertility Rites
- Patron Saints of Fishing (at Bunganut Lake Online)
