= Obando Fertility Rites =

Filipino dance ritual

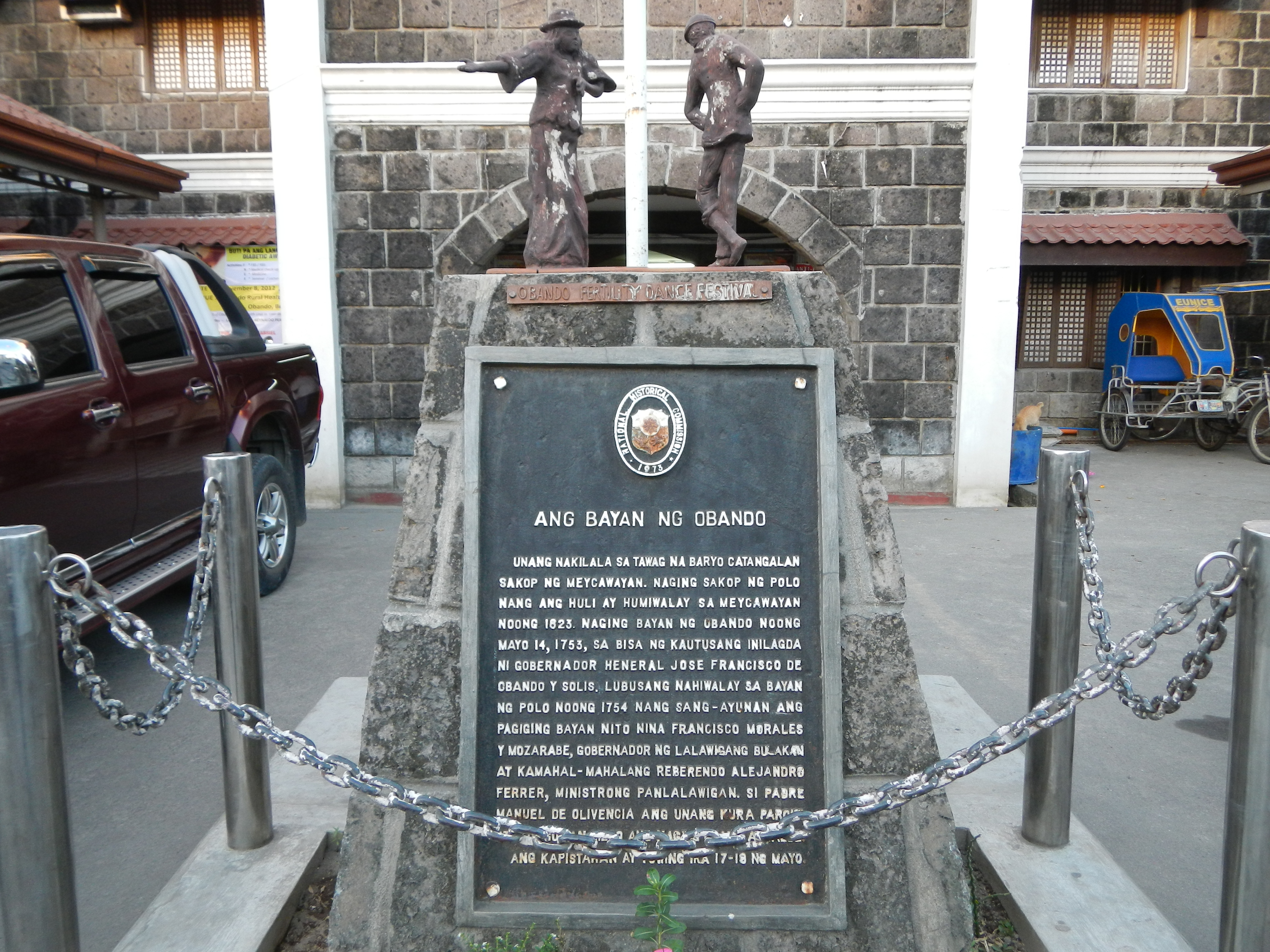
The Obando Fertility Rites and Dance monument in front of the town hall of Obando, Bulacan.

The Obando Fertility Rites are a dance ritual, Anitist in origin, that later became a Catholic festival celebrated every May in Obando, Bulacan, Philippines. Locals and pilgrims, sometimes dressed in traditional costume, dance and sing in the town's streets to honor and beseech Obando's three patron saints: San Pascual (Paschal Baylón), Santa Clara (Clare of Assisi), and Nuestra Señora de Salambáo (Our Lady of Salambao).

== Origin ==
The fertility rites were initially done in honor of the anito Diyan Masalanta, the Tagalog goddess of love, Lakapati, the Tagalog fertility deity, and Bathala, the supreme deity of the Tagalog people. The rites were performed within the vicinity of a dambana. When the Spaniards arrived, they converted the natives to Christianity and changed their religious beliefs regarding the fertility rites.

== Festivities ==
The rites are observed in a triduum: 17 May for St. Paschal Baylon, 18 May for St. Clare of Assisi, and 19 May for Our Lady of Salambáo. Each of the three days usually begins with a morning Mass said by the parish priest. A procession, held immediately thereafter, consists of the three saints' images followed by bands playing instruments made of bamboo or brass, and devotees who dance the fandango while singing the hymn, Santa Clara Pinung-Pino (Saint Clare, Most Refined). The image of each saint leads the procession on his or her designated feast day.

The rites, especially the fertility dance, are popular with pilgrims from all over the Philippines, most of whom supplicate the triad of saints for a child, a spouse, or general good fortune. Throughout the three days, devotees joyously dance in the streets as a form of prayer, asking for the spirit of life to enter into the wombs of women.

== The patron saints ==
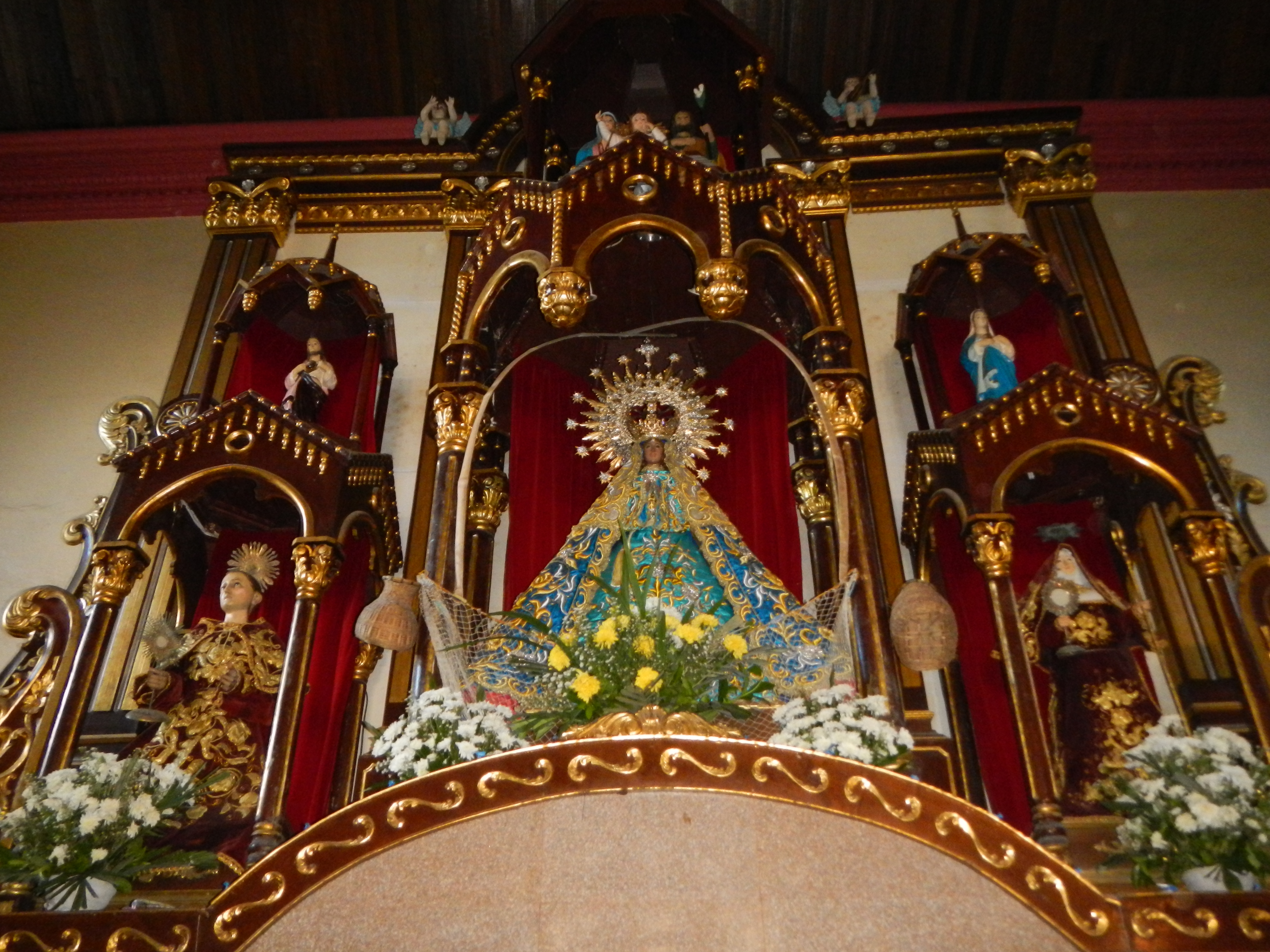
Images of the three saints above the altar of Obando Church: Our Lady of Salambáo is in the center, flanked by St. Paschal to her right and St. Clare to her left.

=== Saint Clare ===
St. Clare of Assisi is the oldest saint declared patroness of Catanghalan (the town's former name), her image was first enshrined in the chapel built by missionaries of the Order of Friars Minor in the town. St. Clare was a 13th-century Italian nun, who founded the Poor Clares according to the rules and teachings of her contemporary, St. Francis of Assisi.

St. Clare became the patroness of good weather because her Spanish name, Clara, also referred to clearer skies after a storm. This formed the basis for the Filipino custom of offering chicken eggs to St. Clare to ensure good weather, as the Spanish word for egg white or albumen, clara, is also a pun on her name. Devotees participating in the rites would sometimes hold eggs as they swayed to the fandango.

The introduction of St. Clare by Spanish Franciscans as a replacement for pre-colonial Tagalog gods, especially the deity of conception Diyan Masalanta, transformed the old, animist Kasilonawan dancing ritual into the offering of the fandango to the saint to prevent or cure sterility in women. Eventually, St. Clare evolved into the patroness of individuals seeking a mate and to have children, particularly daughters.

==== Santa Clarang Pinong-pino ====
- "Santa Clarang pinong-pino / Ako po ay bigyán mo / Ng asawang labíntatló / Sa gastos 'di magreklamo!"
- ("Saint Clare, most refined / Unto me bestow / Spouses, thirteen in all / For the expense, I shan't complain!")
- A variation: "Santa Clarang pinong-pino / Ang pangakò ko ay ganitó / Pagdatíng ko sa Obando / Sasayáw ako ng pandanggo."
- ("Saint Clare, most refined / My promise is like so / When I arrive at Obando / I shall dance the fandango.")

=== Saint Paschal ===
During the 18th century, the Franciscan missionaries built the town church and introduced the veneration of St. Paschal Baylón. His surname, Baylón, was taken to mean "one who likes dancing", ultimately derived from the Spanish bailar ("to dance"). Like St. Clare, the saint also became a patron invoked for fertility, wealth, and abundance.

An anecdote tells of how a childless couple from the neighboring town of Hagonoy met a youth selling crabs. The young man told the couple to visit Obando and participate in the rites to ameliorate their condition. Upon entering Obando Church, the couple was amazed by the sight of St. Paschal's image, for its face looked exactly like the young crab vendor. This is the origin of St. Paschal's patronage of childless couples who wish to have children, particularly sons.

=== Our Lady of Salambáo ===
On 19 June 1763, Our Lady of Salambáo (formal title: "Our Lady of the Immaculate Conception of Salambáo") was the last saint whose cultus was introduced to Obando.

Legend tells of three fishermen named Juan, Julián, and Diego de la Cruz, who caught the Virgin Mary's image in their salambáw, a fishing net supported with bamboo crosspieces and mounted on a raft. They were fishing at a place known as Hulingduong, Binwangan (now part of Malabon), and when they decided to bring the image to the neighbouring town of Navotas, their boat suddenly grew heavy and immobile. When they eventually decided to bring the image to Obando instead, their boat quickly lightened and became easy to row. This was taken a sign that the Virgin wanted to be enshrined in Obando Church. She is venerated there as the local patroness of fishing and good harvests.

== Ban and post-war revival ==
During World War II, the church and a large portion of Obando were ravaged by fire; included amongst the damaged property were the images of the three patron saints. A few years after the war's end, both the Archbishop of Manila and the vicar of Obando Church forbade the fertility dance due to its pagan origins. During the prohibition, normal religious processions were still held on the triduum, but without the lively street dancing.

In 1972, parish priest Rev. Fr. Rome R. Fernández and the Komisyon ng Kalinangan (Commission on Culture) of Obando helped in having the ban lifted and in reviving the ancient dance ritual, which is still practiced to this day.

A contingent representing this festival took part in the celebrations of the 1998 Philippine Centennial.

== In popular culture ==
In his 1887 novel Noli Me Tángere, José Rizal, the Philippine national hero, has a character in Chapter 6 ("Captain Tiago") attribute her long-sought pregnancy to the rites. The pregnancy results in the birth of one of the novel's principal characters, María Clara.

In 2012, the rites were featured in the pilot episode of the Filipino teleserye Ina Kapatid Anak, which used fertility issues as a plot device.

== Gallery ==
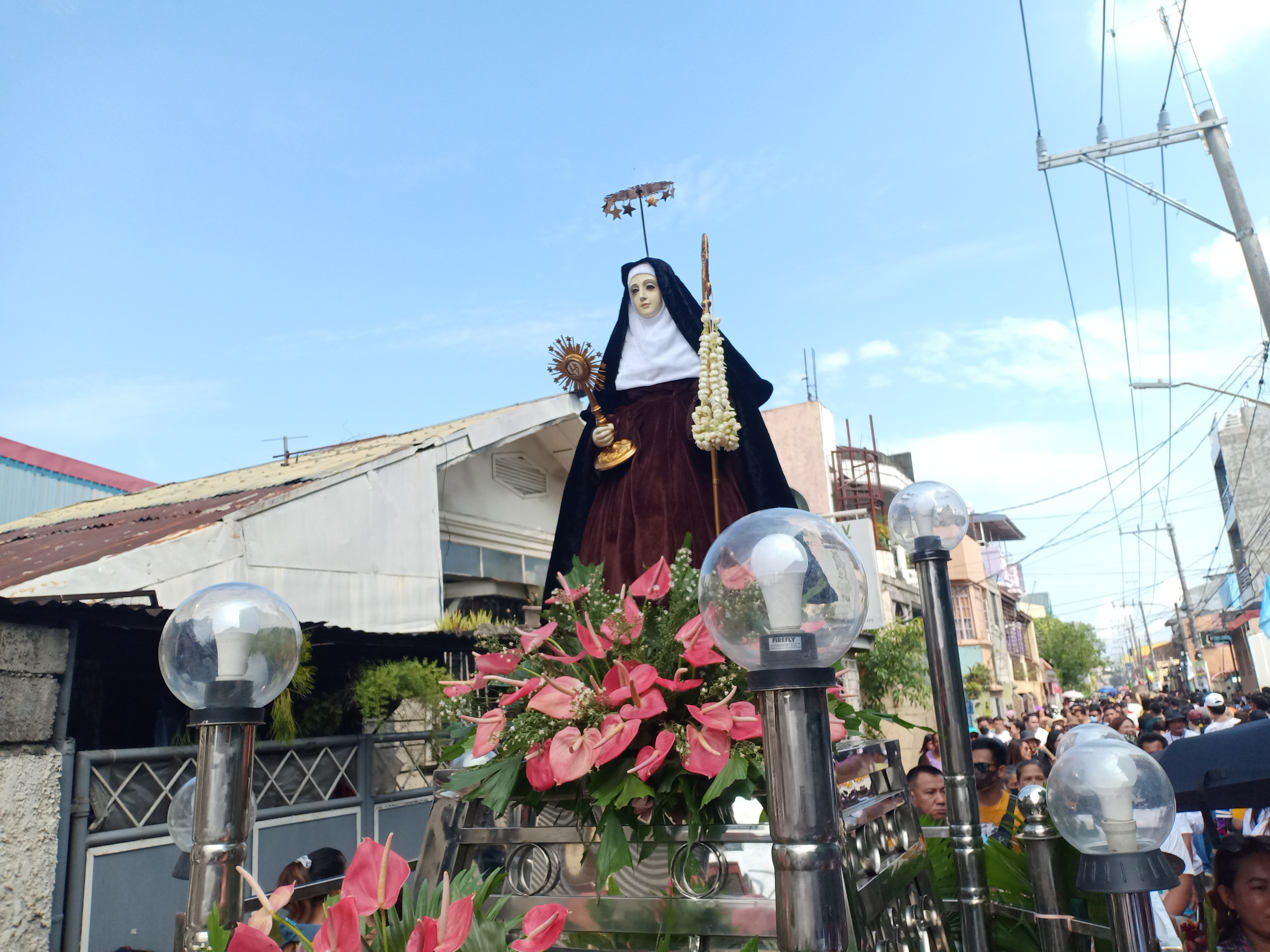
St. Clare of Assisi

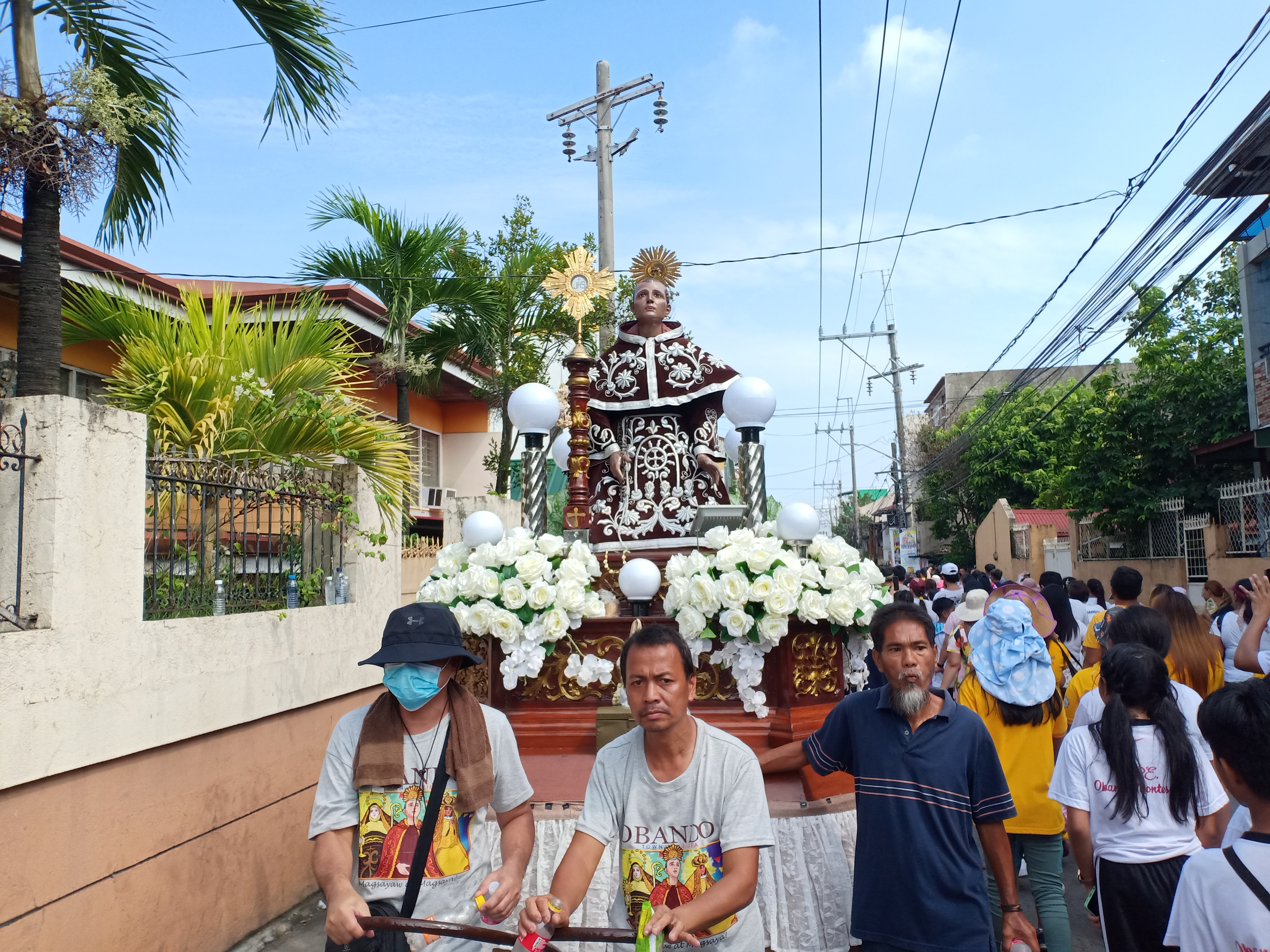
St. Paschal Baylón

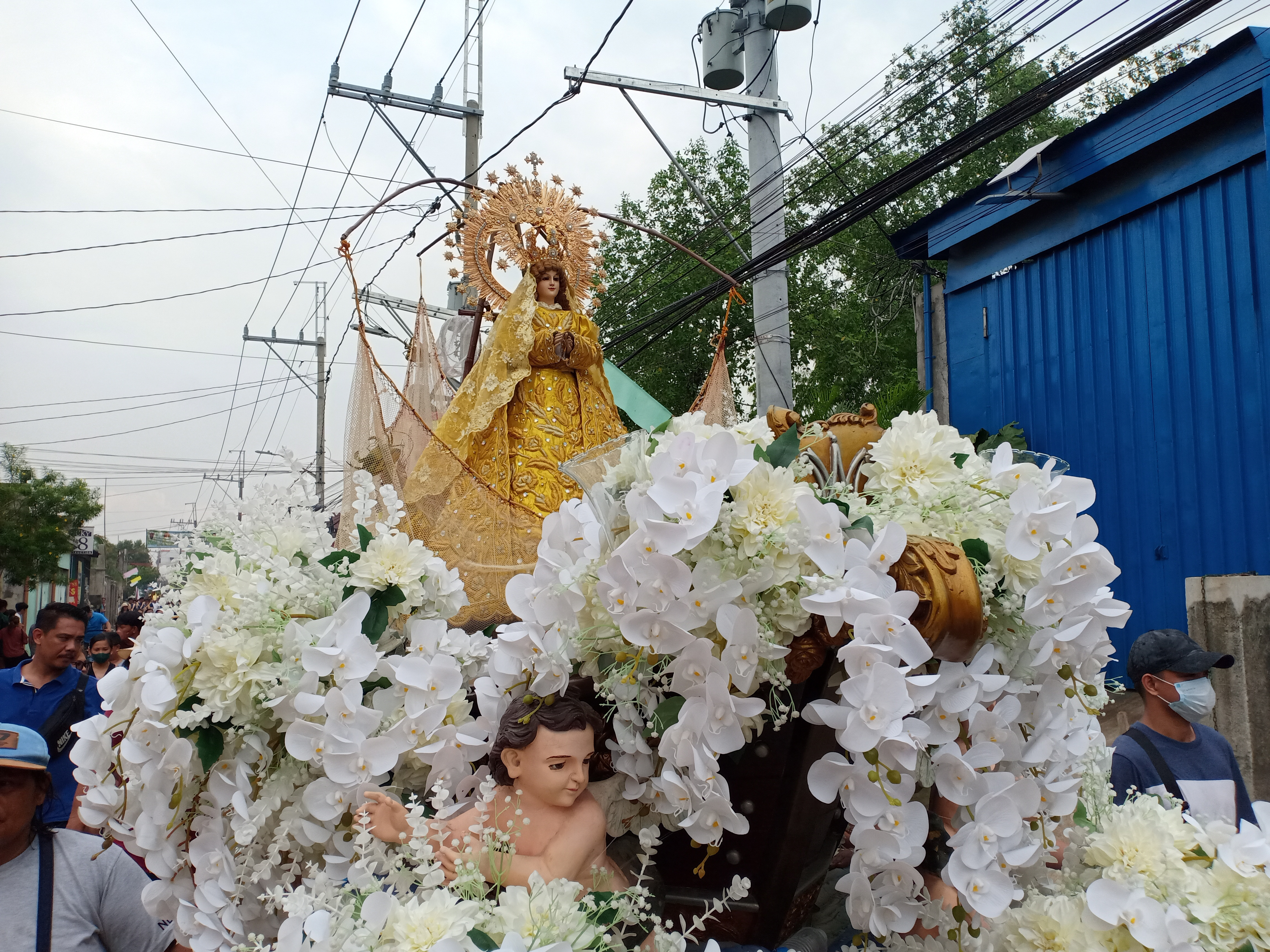
Our Lady of Salambao

== See also ==
- Colegio de San Pascual Baylon
- Folk Catholicism
- Religion in the Philippines
- Sexuality in the Philippines
- Demographics of the Philippines § Single mother phenomenon and illegitimate birth rate
