= Libyan Heritage House =

- Founded: July 2020
- Type: Non-profit cultural initiative
- Headquarters: Washington, D.C., United States
- Key people: Sarah Shennib; Sharon Rodwell
- Website: https://libyanheritagehouse.org

Libyan Heritage House (LHH) is a non-profit cultural heritage initiative founded in 2020 and focused on the documentation, preservation, and promotion of Libya's historical and cultural heritage.

== History ==
Libyan Heritage House was founded in July 2020 as an online initiative dedicated to Libyan cultural heritage, with initial funding and institutional support from the National Council on U.S.-Libya Relations, a U.S.-based 501(c) nonprofit organization.

In 2022, the initiative expanded its scope to include broader cultural preservation, restoration, and digital documentation efforts related to Libya's historical and archaeological heritage.

== Activities ==
=== Documentation and publications ===
Libyan Heritage House publishes articles and thematic content related to Libyan history, geography, architecture, archaeology, and cultural traditions. Notably, the initiative has documented elements of Libya's built heritage, including colonial-era architecture in Benghazi.

=== Online exhibitions ===
The Libyan Heritage House organizes digital exhibitions hosted on its website. In November 2024, it launched ''Omar Al Mukhtar: The Life and History of a Libyan Hero'', a digital exhibition dedicated to the Libyan resistance leader Omar al-Mukhtar.

=== Conservation and Restoration ===
The Libyan Heritage House has undertaken heritage preservation projects in Libya. During the 2022–2023 period, it sponsored and managed conservation activities in the Agora area of the ancient Greek city of Cyrene. It has also listed restoration-related activities related to the archaeological site of the ancient Byzantine city of Olbia (Theodorias).

In 2025, LHH announced the commission of an in-depth catalogue of Libyan heritage sites using high-resolution photography and drone footage of architectural and archeological sites across Libya, to digitally preserve and evaluate conditions at these cultural sites.

== See also ==
- Archaeology of Libya
