= Sustainable Preservation Initiative =

Escala Initiative
- Type: Nonprofit organization
- Purpose: Women entrepreneurship, small business development, cultural heritage preservation
- Location: Peru, Mexico, Tanzania, Guatemala
- Region served: Developing countries
- Method: Business school and capacity-building programs, workshops, mentoring, catalytic capital investment
- Website: Escala Initiative Official Site

The Escala Initiative now operates the programs of the Sustainable Preservation Initiative. It is focused on helping women entrepreneurs in developing countries build a better future for themselves, their families, and their communities. Through its 10-month formalized Business School and Capacity Building Program, ESCALA empowers women entrepreneurs to hurdle economic and social barriers as business owners. The comprehensive and proven curriculum teaches critical entrepreneurial and business skills through workshops and mentoring sessions that prepare students for success. All of the students have either started their own small business or plan to do so while enrolled in the program. They are engaged in a variety of industries such as textiles, food, and tourism. ESCALA presently works in Peru, Mexico, Tanzania, and Guatemala.

SPI had focused its program around archaeological sites, but Escala has now expanded them to women and other marginalized entrepreneurs more broadly. According to Felix Salmon of Reuters, the program was about taking archaeological sites "in poor countries and making them generate cash for the locals — thereby giving them a real monetary incentive (rather than a high-minded lecture) aimed at preserving archeological treasures." In an article on job creation, Salmon cites the initiative as a model for maximum job creation through small investments: "In general, if you want to create the maximum number of jobs for the smallest amount of money, the best way of doing so is to provide catalytic capital which helps to give a small business the step-up it needs to sustain new jobs on a permanent basis". In a recent report, the Milken Institute called for the adoption of this model by the state of Israel in order to better protect that country's cultural heritage. Handeye Magazine, an international publication dedicated to culture and commerce, cites the organization as one that "continues to put 'people, not stones' at the forefront, placing equal or greater focus on economic and social investment as opposed to purely preservation." BigThink.com, a website that seeks to identify the "best thinking on the planet — the ideas that can help you think flexibly and act decisively in a multivariate world," featured SPI's paradigm for preservation and its success.

== See also ==
- Libyan Heritage House
