= Scottish Police Services Authority – Information Communications Technology =

SPSA-ICT

Agency overview
- Formed: 2007 (re-badged from Scottish Police Information Strategy (SPIS), and moved from Atlantic Quay, Glasgow, to St Vincent Street, Glasgow)

Jurisdictional structure
- Operations jurisdiction: Scotland, UK

Operational structure
- Headquarters: Glasgow
- Sworn members: Approx 50 Police Staff, plus 2-3 seconded officers
- Agency executive: Robert Kirkwood, Director

Website
- http://www.spis.police.uk/

The Scottish Police Services Authority – Information Communications Technology (SPSA-ICT), formerly known as the Scottish Police Information Strategy (SPIS), was an organization within the Scottish Police Services responsible for developing new national systems that had a cross-force scope. The personnel consisted primarily of around 50 police staff, mainly IT professionals specializing in a range of technologies, including a large number of Java EE developers and Oracle Database Administrators (DBAs). The team also included some development staff specializing in .NET technologies. Non-technical staff included project managers, administrative staff, software testers, senior management, and a small number of seconded police officers from Scotland's eight police forces and from SPSA-Criminal Justice (formerly SCRO), who provided specialist knowledge on projects under construction.

However, since the formation of Police Scotland in 2013, many of SPSA's functions were integrated into the national police force. This included key ICT responsibilities, with Police Scotland now managing digital infrastructure and projects related to police services. In 2018 Police Scotland has also published a 10-year digital transformation plan, which focuses on upgrading its technology infrastructure, enhancing mobile capabilities, improving data integration, and increasing cyber resilience.

== Projects Undertaken ==
=== The Scottish Intelligence Database (SID) ===
The Scottish Intelligence Database was designed by an external supplier, ABM United Kingdom Limited, under the supervision of a team from SPIS, headed by Detective Superintendent Ian McCandlish, seconded from Strathclyde Police. In respect of his involvement with the SID Project, Det Supt McCandlish was a contributor to the Bichard Inquiry (concerning the 2002 murders of Holly Wells and Jessica Chapman by Ian Huntley, in particular the concerns that case raised regarding how a person with Huntley's police record and background could have been approved to work in proximity to children).

=== Automatic Number Plate Recognition (ANPR2) ===
The ANPR2 Project is an ongoing SPSA-ICT project, concerning the provision of automated number plate recognition (ANPR) technologies to the Scottish Police Service. Notable/controversial aspects of the technologies employed in the project include the collection of information via hidden cameras, concealed in cats eyes in the road.

=== The Scottish Criminal Records Office replacement system ===
The Scottish Criminal Records Office replacement system, also known as the Criminal History System (CHS), was developed by SPIS for SCRO (now known as Scottish Police Services Authority — Criminal Justice, or SPSA-CJ for short).

The CHS Project was undertaken between 2001 and 2007. It was implemented using Java EE and Oracle, with Hibernate and Spring. The Project proved problematic for SPIS / SPSA-ICT, eventually culminating in negative news coverage and questions being asked in the Scottish Parliament regarding the cost of the system, the rationale of its design, and the way it had been managed (see Controversy and External Criticism below).

=== Scottish National Firearms Certificate Holders Register (SNFCHR) ===
The SNFCHR project was developed by SPIS between 1995 and 2005. In July 2005 a decision was made that an off-the-shelf software package that was already being used by several English police forces provided a better-value solution to the issue of maintaining a register of persons authorised to keep firearms, and as a consequence the SNFCHR project was cancelled.

=== The National Custody System ===
The National Custody System was designed for the .NET and Oracle platforms. Initial scoping and design work took place between November 2002 and January 2007, with first rollout of the system to a Scottish Force (Dumfries and Galloway Constabulary) taking place in February 2007. As of January 2008, the system is currently being reviewed for rollout within a second Scottish force, Strathclyde Police. In 2017 Police Scotland use the National custody system throughout the whole of Scotland. Other forces in England and Wales use their own local systems that are not accessible with other police forces

=== Human Resources System ===
The HRS Project aimed to provide a single, coherent personnel system to the Scottish Police Service. Another personnel system, originally developed internally by Tayside Police, known as SCOPE, also remained in use, however. As a combined result of the move from SPIS to SPSA-ICT, and of the elements within Tayside Police responsible for SCOPE also moving to come under the SPSA, as of April 2007, the SPSA is effectively maintaining two, essentially competing, systems geared at providing a personnel management solution. A decision has still to be made regarding which of the two systems will go on to become the single system originally envisaged. This issue is complicated by the fact that different forces in Scotland independently use each system, and by the fact that some of SPSA-ICT's own projects (for example, the National Custody Project) are actually designed to interface solely with the SCOPE solution that was developed by Tayside Police, rather than the HRS solution that was developed by their own staff.

== Controversy and external criticism ==
SPIS, and later SPSA-ICT, came under considerable public criticism for their handling of the delivery of the Criminal History System project. The cost of the system rose from an initial estimate of £1.5m, to an eventual bill of over ten times that amount. In addition to the cost overrun, the system was delivered more than three years later than even a revised estimate of the delivery date, and did not provide any new capabilities that the system it was intended to replace had previously provided. In the most literal sense, the new system was an exact replica of the 1980s-style green-screen, unifont, text-only system that preceded it; the only difference was that this exactly identical interface was presented to users via a secure web browser, rather than via a mainframe terminal. The rationale given for this decision to re-invent an outdated wheel was that proceeding this way would save on training costs for existing staff. This was widely perceived as incredibly shortsighted, given that staff retire or leave and are replaced on a rolling basis, and that consequently the training of new staff will therefore always be an issue, regardless of the nature of the system they require to be trained upon. Additionally, as the new system did not take full advantage of the considerable advances in information technology that have come along since the original 1980's design was envisaged, it was felt that a chance to significantly enhance the safety and efficiency of, for example, the processes that allow persons to be vetted for working with children had been missed. Questions about SPIS / SPSA-ICT's handling of the project were raised in the Scottish news media, by the BBC News, and by an opposition MSP, Stewart Maxwell, in the Scottish Parliament, who called the project "a complete disaster". The net result of the criticism received was that an external software supplier, Real Time Engineering, was brought in to provide Development expertise and Project Management oversight to the project during the period Summer 2005 — Autumn 2007.

== Sources ==
- SPSA website, as at January 2007
- SPSA-ICT website, as at January 2007
- ABM Intelligent Solutions / SPIS press release on SID
- Bichard Enquiry: The Guardian report from 17 February 2005, including a contribution from Detective Superintendent McCandlish of the SPIS Scottish Intelligence Database team.
- UK Speed Trap Guide: cameras concealed within Cats Eyes.
- BBC article regarding questions asked in the Scottish Parliament about the handling of the CHS Project by SPIS.
- Glasgow Herald report on the delayed CHS rollout, June 2007.
