= Colegio de San Pascual Baylon =

Roman Catholic college in Bulacan, Philippines

- Former names: St. Pascual Institution; Escuela Catolica
- Type: Private
- Established: February 11, 1913
- Academic affiliations: Religious Catechists of Mary
- Students: ~1,939
- Location: Pag-asa, Obando, Bulacan, Philippines; 14°42′36″N 120°56′10″E
- Language: English, Filipino
- Colors: Dark green
- Website: www.cspb.edu.ph
- Location in Bulacan Location in Luzon Location in the Philippines

Colegio de San Pascual Baylon or the College of St. Paschal Baylon (CSPB), formerly Escuela Catolica and St. Pascual Institution (SPI), is a collegiate school at Obando, Bulacan in the Philippines. The school started as a catechetical school on February 11, 1913, through the efforts of Rev. Fr. Juan Dilag, then parish priest of Obando. It became a pre-elementary school, and elementary institution in 1936, added a secondary level in 1939 through 1943, then became a college. Formerly managed by the Sisters Religious of the Virgin Mary, it is currently managed by the Dominican Sisters of St. Joseph, a religious congregation in Bulacan. It was formally recognized by the government of the Philippines in 1921. Its name was derived from one of Obando, Bulacan’s patron saints.

== History ==
After being destroyed by fire in February 1944, the school re-opened in 1947. There was separate departments for boys and girls during the time of the parish priest Rev. Fr. Rome Fernandez, who also served as a director of the educational institution. Fernandez managed the boys department while the Religious of the Virgin Mary sisters managed the girls department. After twelve years, the two departments were merged, during the school year of 1975-1976. The kindergarten level was also opened during that time. The merging of the boys and girls departments only lasted for seven years. The two departments separated during the school year 1982-1983. A college department was later opened in June 1985, leading to the change of name from St. Pascual Institution to Colegio de San Pascual Baylon. In 1988, the management of the school was handed over to the Dominican Sisters of St. Joseph by the Most Rev. Cirilo R. Almario, D.D., the bishop of Malolos, Bulacan.

As an educational community, Colegio de San Pascual Baylon is run by 125 personnel (teaching, non-teaching and administrative staff). The college normally educates about 1,939 students per year, from nursery education to the college level. The students are referred to as Paschalians. The school is now 100 years old.

== Facilities ==
The school has a speech laboratory, a library, an audio-visual room, and participates in the yearly inter-school competition held by the BULPRISA or Bulacan Private Schools Association. Apart from academic lessons, the school also provides training in sports-related activities such as basketball, volleyball, and badminton. Kairos, its student newspaper which was first published in 2004, is published twice in a school year.

== Courses offered ==
- Bachelor of Science in commerce with majors in banking and finance
- Management and marketing
- Bachelor of Science in computer science
- Bachelor of Secondary Education (BSEd), major in English, Filipino, social science, mathematics, and general science
- Bachelor of Elementary Education (BEEd) with specialization in preschool education
- Professional education course (certificate in professional education).
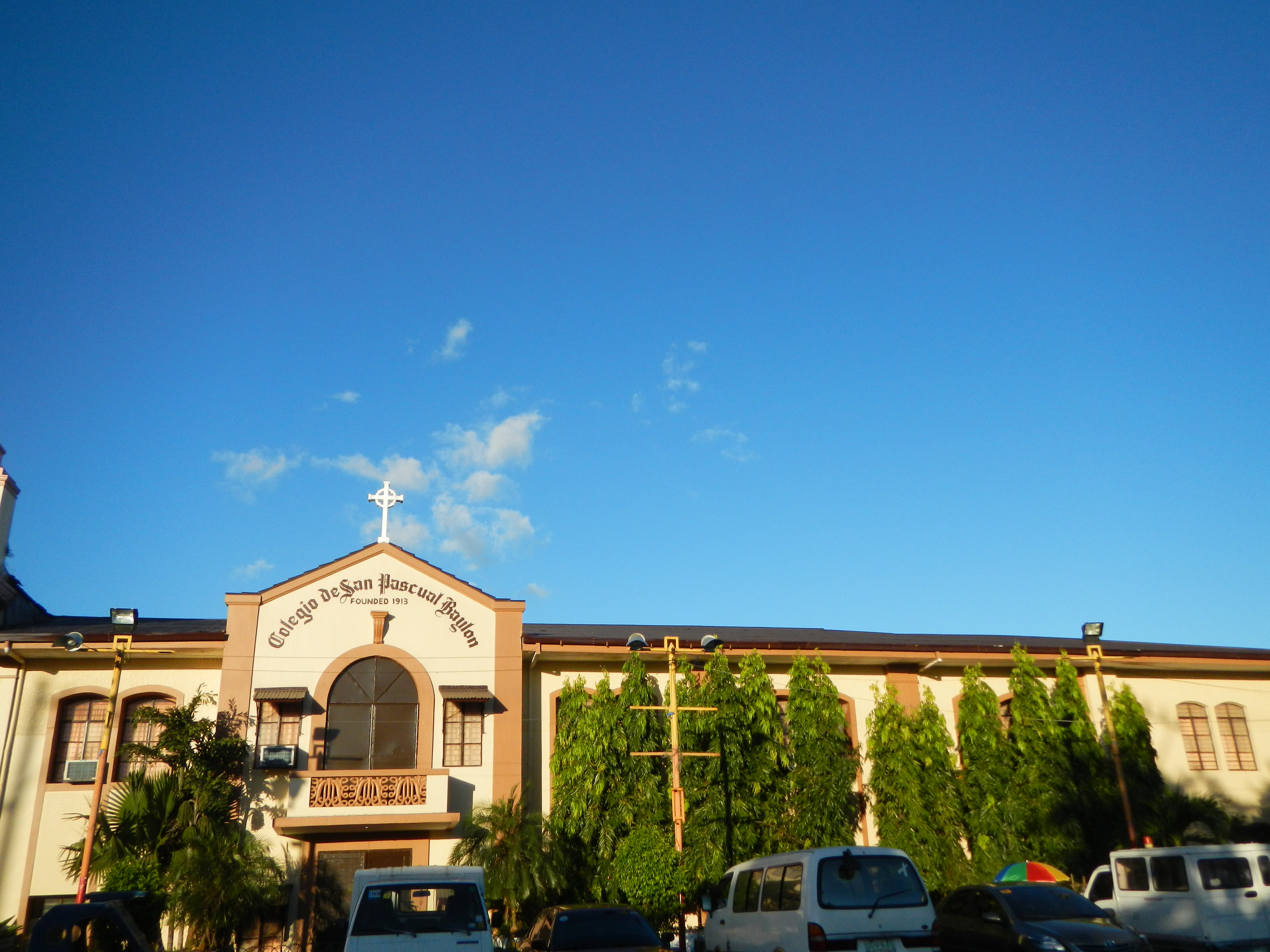
Colegio de San Pascual Baylon facade (beside the church)

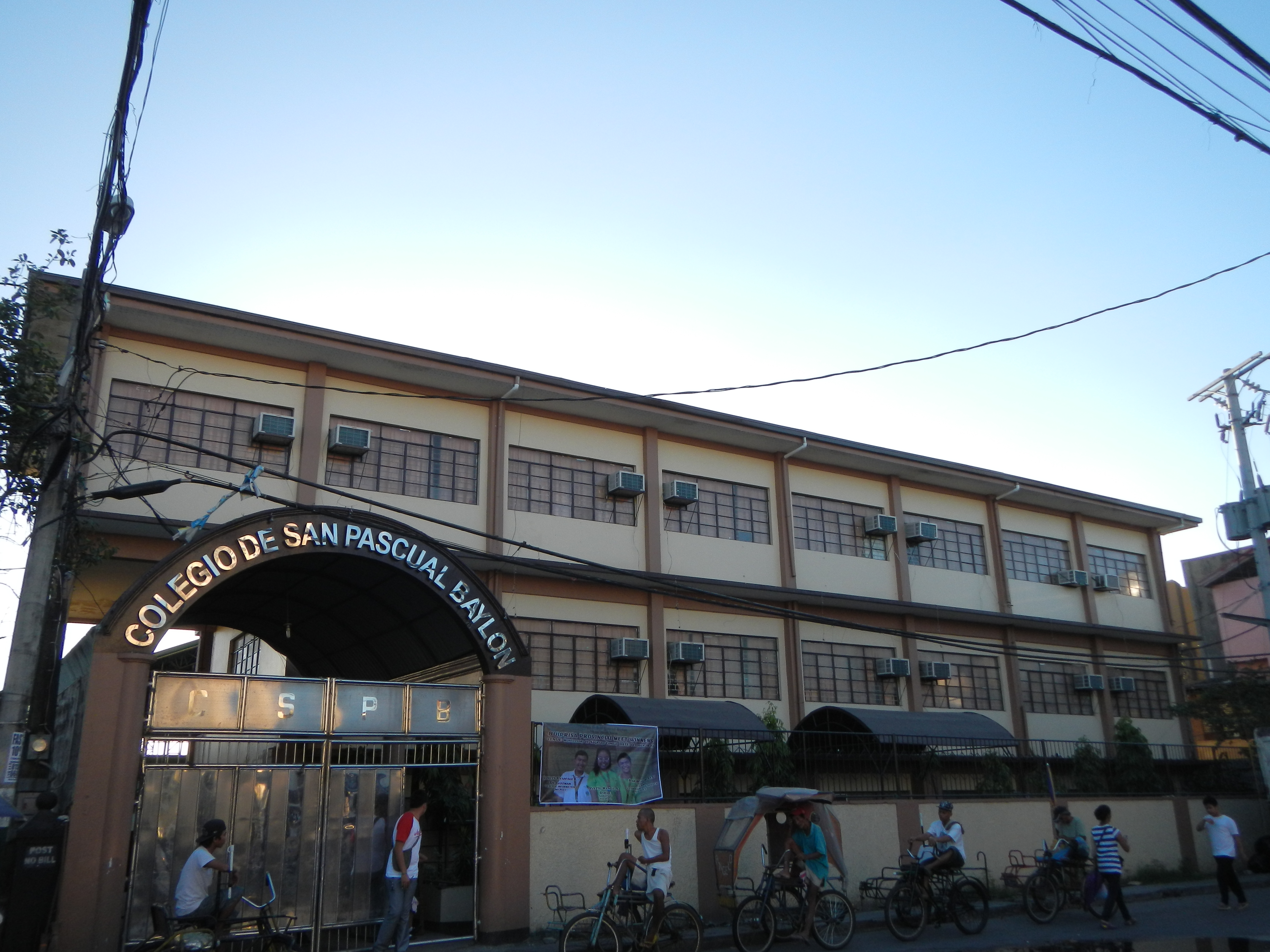
College in front of the church

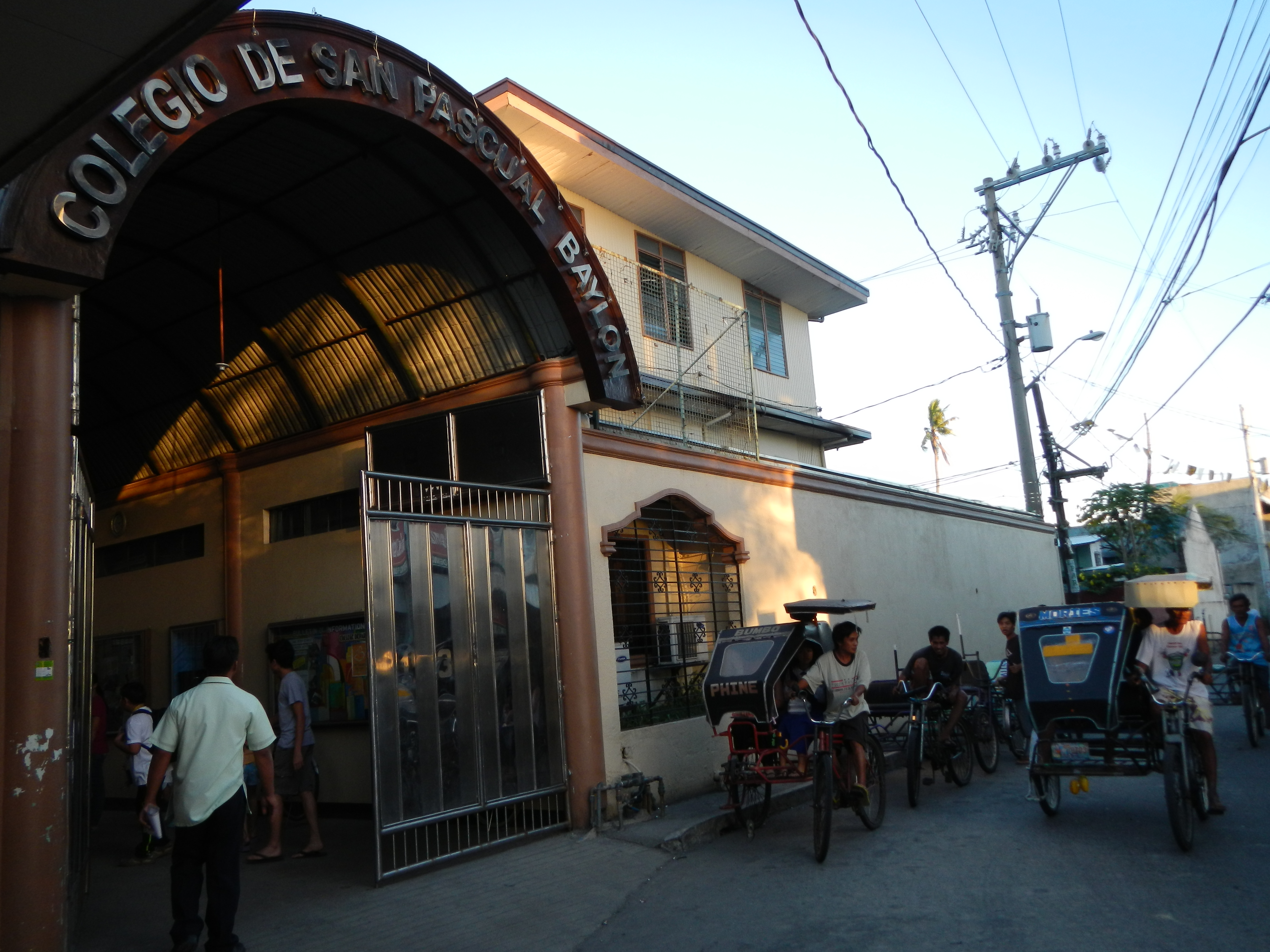
College entrance near the town hall

== See also ==
- Obando Fertility Rites
- Obando Church
- Religious of the Virgin Mary
