= List of recorded monarchs in the Philippines =

The following is a listing of the sovereigns of the kingdoms in the Philippine archipelago before their dominions fell to either the Kingdom of the Spains and the Indies (mostly in the 16th or 17th century) or the United States of America (in the 20th century), and of their non-sovereign descendants that kept honorary titles.

Mentions of the King of Luzon by the Spanish king Charles V in a decree and correspondences and of the King of Cebu by Hernan Cortes, Spanish governor of New Spain, in his letter to him are found in Spanish records; these occurred in the first half of 16th century.

After the fall of particular Philippine dominions to the Kingdom of the Spains and the Indies which started in 1565, due to the much earlier Spanish royal authorization given to the royal audience and chancery of New Spain on 26 February 1538 to prohibit the title of "lord" from being adopted by the nobles of acquired overseas dominions, since, according to its author the Spanish queen Isabella, "it is convenient for our service and royal preeminence that they are not called [lords]" but principals, the particular Philippine nobles who swore allegiance to Spain became part of the "principalia" or Philippine principality and came to be considered as "principal Indians". This same authorization formed part of the Spanish Laws of the Indies as Law 5 of Title 7 of Book 6. The ranks in nobility were also reduced to practically the lowest one based on the truly common designation of "datu" equating it fully to being a "cabeza de barangay" or head of a barangay or town district, with an opportunity for a noble to be elected as "gobernadorcillo" or town governor by the same nobles. Nonetheless, they were given privileges comparable to Spanish nobility such as exemption from taxation, authority of governance, and inheritance of title and privileges; these had also been part of their previous powers albeit reduced. Upon converting to Christianity, these same nobles adopted the initially fairly exclusive titles of "don" and "doña". The occurrence of a Philippine noble becoming a "principal" was only mutually recognized by both the Spanish king and that noble after the noble swore allegiance to the Spanish king. In insular Spanish records, the principalia was also sometimes referred to as nobility, and principals also as nobles.

== In Luzon and its peripheries ==
=== Kingdom of Luzon ===
The Kingdom of Luzon was described as one of the more powerful and wealthier kingdoms in the archipelago. It was noted for its commerce, literacy, diplomacy, navy, and use of artillery. Its influence ranged at least from Mindoro to Kapampangan lordships, with possibilities of greater extent suggested by the name of the kingdom. The kingdom and its subjects began to fall under the Kingdom of the Spains and the Indies, starting in 1570, just as the Kingdom of Luzon was starting to adopt Islam.

Name	Title	From	Until	Events
Seri Laila	Raja (King)	1400s	before 1521	Known in Tagalog as "Sala Lila" (or "Salalila"); died many years before the first Castilian voyage to Ternate, leaving his son, the very young crown prince, to the queen regent in Manila.
Ache	Raja (King)	after 1521	1571	Married a princess of Brunei in 1521 while he was the Crown Prince of Luzon and the grand admiral of Brunei; was given the epithet "the Old" (Matanda); witnessed the fall of Manila on 24 May 1570; uncle of Sulayman, the heir apparent (raja muda).

== In the Visayan islands ==
=== Kingdom of Cebu ===
The Kingdom of Cebu was known for its military achievements and for having a large army. The male citizens of the kingdom were tattooed as marks of honour. Its dominion became a protectorate of the Kingdom of the Spains and the Indies in 1565 but fell to the said kingdom after 1570.

Name	Title	From	Until	Events
Lumay	Sri (Lord)	(no given date)	(no given date)	(no given events)
Humabon	Raja (King)	before 1521	c. 1570	Received the first Castilian voyage to Ternate; was baptised as a Christian king in 1521 as Carlos, while his wife was baptised as Juana, the same names as the King and the Queen of the Spains and the Indies; received a letter from Hernan Cortes, Marquess of Oaxaca, in the name of the Kingdom of the Spains and the Indies in 1527 regarding the possession of some of the crew left by this voyage; witnessed the fall of Cebu on 8 May 1565; uncle of Tupas, the heir apparent (raja muda)

=== Principality of Mactan ===
Mactan is known to have had several rulers at the same time, unlike most principalities in the neighbouring Cebu. Mactan is assumed to have had its own sovereign.

Name	Title	From	Until	Events
Zula	Datu (Lord)	before 1521	after 1521	Received the first Castilian voyage to Ternate
Lapu-lapu	Datu (Lord)	before 1521	after 1521	Defeated the forces from the first Castilian voyage to Ternate under its General Ferdinand Magellan in a battle on 27 April 1521, as Ferdinand Magellan acted under the request of Humabon of Cebu

=== Lordship of Bohol ===
Name	Title	From	Until	Events
Katuna	Raja (King)	unknown	1565	Under the Kingdom of Bohol until 1563; received the sixth Castilian voyage to Ternate in 1565

=== Lordship of Baclayon ===
Name	Title	From	Until	Events
Pagbuaya	Datu (Lord)	(no given date)	1563	Co-ruled with his brother Dailisan; supposedly founded Dapitan in northern Mindanao
Dailisan	Datu (Lord)	(no given date)	1563	Co-ruled with his brother Pagbuaya; his death during a Portuguese raid dissolved the lordship

=== Kingdom of Limasawa ===
Name	Title	From	Until	Events
Kulambo	Raja (King)	before 1521	after 1521	Received the first Castilian voyage to Ternate; accompanied this fleet to Cebu on 7 April 1521

== In Mindanao and its peripheries ==
=== Kingdom of Butuan and Caraga ===
Name	Title	From	Until	Events
Kiling	Raja (King)	989	1009	Received the embassy of Li Shu-Han (李竾罕)
Sri Bata Shaja	Raja (King)	c. 1011	1000s	Received the mission of Li Kan-Hsieh (李于燮)
Awi	Raja (King)	before 1521	after 1521	Received the first Castilian voyage to Ternate

=== Kingdom of Dapitan ===
Name	Title	From	Until	Events
Pagbuaya	Datu (King)	1563	after 1563	Converted to Christianity
Manooc	Datu (King)	after 1563	1595	Was baptised as Pedro Manuel Manooc

=== Sultanate of Cotabato ===
Name	Title	From	Until	Events
Piang	Sultan	1899	after 1900	Contemporary of late Spanish rule, the first Republic of the Philippines, and early American rule; became the first Governor of Cotabato under American rule

=== Maguindanao Sultanate ===
The dominion of the Sultanate of Maguindanao gradually fell to the United States of America in the 1900s.

Reign	Title and Name	Other name(s)
1515-1543	Shariff Muhammed Kabungsuwan	
1543–1574	Sultan Maka-alang Sari Pada	
1574–1578	Sultan Bangkaya	
1578–1585	Sultan Dimasangcay Adel	
1585–1597	Sultan Gugu Sari Kula	Datu Salikala
1597–1619	Sultan Laut Buisan	Datu Katchil
1619–1671?	Sultan Muhammad Dipatuan Kudarat	Datu Qudratullah Katchil
1671?–1678?	Sultan Dundang Tidulay	Sultan Saif ud-Din (Saifud Din)
1678?–1699	Sultan Barahaman	Sultan Muhammad Shah Minulu-sa-Rahmatullah
1699–1702	Sultan Kahar ud-Din Kuda	Maulana Amir ul-Umara Jamal ul-Azam
1702–1736	Sultan Bayan ul-Anwar	Maruhom Batua; Dipatuan Jalal ud-Din; Mupat Batua (posthumously)
1710–1736 (in Tamontaka)	Sultan Amir ud-Din	Paduka Sri Sultan Muhammad Jafar Sadiq Manamir; Shahid Mupat (posthumously)
1736–1748 (in Sibugay, Buayan, Malabang)	Sultan Muhammad Tahir ud-Din	Dipatuan Malinug; Muhammad Shah Amir ud-Din
1733–1755	Sultan Raja Muda Muhammad Khair ud-Din	Pakir Maulana Kamsa; Amir ud-Din Itamza; Azim ud-Din Amir ul-M'umimin
1755–1780?	Sultan Pahar ud-Din	Datu Panglu/Pongloc; Mupat Hidayat (posthumously)
1780?–1805?	Sultan Kibad Sahriyal	Muhammad Azim ud-Din Amir ul-Umara
1805?–1830?	Sultan Kawasa Anwar ud-Din	Muhammad Amir ul-Umara Iskandar Jukarnain
1830–1854	Sultan Qudratullah Untung	Iskandar Qudratullah Muhammad Jamal ul-Azam; Iskandar Qudarat Pahar ud-Din. Properly place, his name was Ullah Untong and seated as Sultan Ashrf Samalan Farid Quadratullah or better known as Sultan Qudarat.
1854–1884	Sultan Muhammad Makakwa	
1884–1888	Sultan Wata	Sultan Muhammad Jalal ud-Din Pablu
1888–1896	(Interregnum)	Sultan Anwar ud-Din contested Datu Mamaku (son of Sultan Qudratullah Untung) of Buayan for the throne versus the then sultan Datu Mangigin of Sibugay.
1896–1898	Sultan Taha Colo	Sultan Rabago sa Tiguma
1908–1933	Sultan Mastura Kudarat	Sultan Muhammad Hijaban Iskandar Mastura Kudarat; Sultan Mastura; Sultan Muhammad Dipatuan Kudarat

=== Kingdom of Basilan and the Yakans ===
Name	Title	From	Until	Events
Kalun	Datu (King)	before 1900	after 1900	Was born Pedro Cuevas Javiér on 6 May 1845 from Bacoor, Cavite; defeated the real Datu Kalun after a battle between the Chavacanos and the Yakans; assumed the title and name and ruled over Basilan island and the Yakans in Mindanao; converted the dominion to Catholic Christianity; founded the city of Lamitan

=== Tausug Sultanate (Sultanate of Sulu) ===
In English toponymy, borrowed from Spanish toponymy, Sulu is the term that refers to the Sultanate of the Tausugs, with this term being an approximation (perhaps Spanish) of the root term "Sulug" in Tausug which is also pronounced as "Suluk" in Malay. Both these terms refer to the Tausug people, the first being an endonym and the second an exonym, besides being the name of the sultanate itself. Jolo is another term that serves this approximation (initially pronounced as /Sho-lo/ in Spanish).

The primary language of the Sultanate of Sulu is Tausug, with Malay and Arabic as secondary languages. The dominion of the sultanate stretched from Sulu in what is now the Philippines to Sabah in what is now Malaysia. From its dominion, the side on the American reckoning of the Philippine islands gradually fell to the United States of America within the first half of the 20th century. The Sabah territory was continually leased by the United Kingdom of Great Britain and Northern Ireland from the Sultan of Sulu, and was then transferred by that kingdom to Malaysia, which continued to pay for the lease.

Part of the legacy of this sultanate is the presence of around 1,200,000 Tausugs in the Philippines and around 700,000 Tausugs in Malaysia at the present time. The royal family of the Sultanate of Sulu still maintains its lineage well-documented.

Title and Name	Flag	From	Until
Sultan Sharif ul-Hashim		1480	1505
Sultan Kamal ud-Din		1505	1527
Sultan Amir ul-Umara		1893	1899
Sultan Jamal ul-Kiram I		1893	1899
Sultan Mahakuttah Kiram		1974	1986
Sultan Muedz ul-Lail Tan Kiram		1986	Present

== In Palawan and its peripheries ==
=== Chiefdom of Southern Palawan ===
Name	Title	From	Until	Events
Harun Ar-Rashid	Datu (Lord) and Sultan	1894	1899	On December 16, 1893, Harun Ar-Rashid, who was involved in a power succession dispute in the Sultanate of Sulu, was forced to be exiled to Palawan.
Bataraza Narrazid	Datu (Lord)	1899		Succeeding his father as the Muslim leader of Palawan under the American Governor-General of Palawan, Edward Y. Miller.
Jolkipli Narrazid	Datu (Lord)			Bataraza Narrazid's younger brother who replaced his older brother's position. He officially took over custody of his sister's children, while also becoming the Muslim leader of Palawan.
Sapiodin Narrazid	Datu (Lord)			Son of Bataraza Narrazid who became the first mayor of Brooke's Point and also became an influential leader of the Muslim community in southern Palawan.

=== Seignory of the Tagbanwas of Coron ===
Name	Title	From	Until	Events
Macarere	Apo (Sire)	(no given date)	(no given date)	(no given events)

== Appendix ==
=== Non-sovereign lordships ===
==== Lordship of Tondo ====
Name	Title	From	Until	Events
Unnamed	Pamegat (Prince); Senapati (Duke)	before 900	900s	Granted a certificate of debt clearance to Lady Angkatan and Lord Bukah, son of Lord Namwaran, in the form of a copper tablet, concerning the debt of Lord Namwaran to the Prince of Dewata; the lordship was a duchy called Tundun in the said document
Luntok	Raja (King)	Unknown	c. 1450	(No given events)
Kalangitan	Dayang (Lady)	c. 1450	c. 1500	Lady of Namayan and Tondo
Banaw	Lakan (Lord)	before 1570	1571	From the House of Lakandula; Lord of Tondo and Sabag
Agustin	Don (Lord; honorary and unofficial)	1575	1588	Had the full name Agustin de Legaspi

=== Title-bearing aristocratic descendants in Philippine republican rule ===
==== Principalities (Datu) ====
Some aristocratic descendants are either officially granted leadership of particular communities by the Republic of the Philippines or unofficially still assume this role.

Muslim

Some Muslim aristocratic descendants who kept ancestral lordly titles have attempted to participate in the republican government and have served as either appointed or democratically elected public officials while they continued to assume roles as community leaders. There are also sometimes contending claimants to the titles. For aristocratic descendants, the following are several examples:

- Datu Pax Mangudadatu – former Governor of Sultan Kudarat from 2001 to 2004
- The Maguindanao Sultanate has an incumbent titular Sultan, Hajji Datu Amir bin Muhammad Baraguir – the 25th Sultan of Maguindanao. Son of Al-Marhum Sultan Hajji Datu Muhammad G.M. Baraguir, Llb. the 24th Sultan of Maguindanao
- The Maranaos have sixteen royal houses that rule the four principalities in what is referred to as the Confederate States of Lanao.

Polytheistic ethnicities

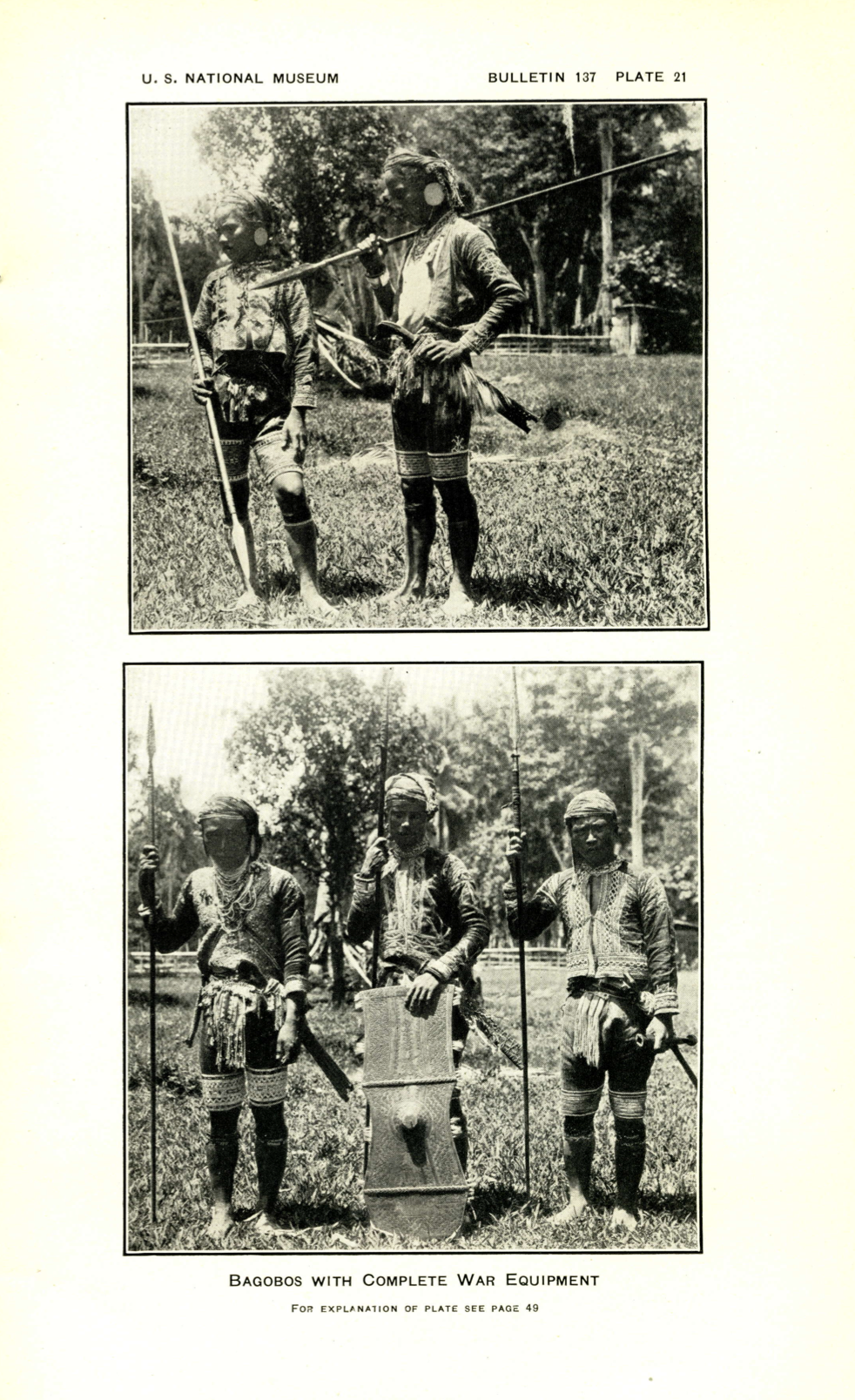
A 1926 photograph of Bagobo (Manobo) warriors in full war regalia. The Bagobo tribe is one of the Lumad tribes in Mindanao.

- Datu Benhur – Lumad leader of the Banuaon tribe
- Datu Viloso Suhat, also known as Datu Lipatuan – a tribal leader from the Tinananon Menuvo tribe in Arakan, Cotabato, and the first Lumad to sit in a local legislative body in central Mindanao.
- Datu Lamparan Talima Danda – the tribal chief from Subanen tribe, and a second generation descendant of Timuay Danda Antanao from Kabasalan, Zamboanga Sibugay. Elected Mayor of Kabasalan, serving from 1961 to 1964. He was the Secretary General of United Subanen Community Association Inc.
- Datu Wilborne Sanghanan Danda – A Tribal Leader of the Peninusula, He became a Board Member of Sangguniang Panlalawigan of Zamboanga Sibugay (2000–2013), Elected Councilor for three terms, Elected Vice Mayor of Municipality of Kabasalan, Zamboanga Sibugay from year 2010–2013, He is the son of Datu Lamparan Talima Danda the Tribal Chieftain of Zamboanga Peninsula.
- Datu Wata Eduardo Lihao Danda – a tribal leader in charge of the communications for the entire Subanen Tribe. He functioned under Datu Lamparan Lihao Danda, his elder brother. He was enlisted into United States Armed Forces of the Far East (USAFFE) during World War II, attach to the Medical Detachment of 106th Infantry (Filipino) Division with rank of Corporal, and captured by the Japanese in May 1942. Datu Wata Eduardo was imprisoned in Camp 78 in Davao, escaped the same year and re-joined with US Army 41st Division. After the liberation of the Philippines from Imperial Japanese forces, he reenlisted to the Philippine Constabulary and retired in 1972. He served as the Secretary General of United Subanen Community Association, Inc. in Zamboanga Sibugay, succeeding his elder brother.
- Datu Labi José Lihao Cayon – a tribal chief of the Subanen tribe and the 1st cousin of Datu Wata Eduardo Lihao Danda and Datu Lamparan Lihao Danda
- Datu Wilfredo Lunsayan Sanggayan - a Municipal Councilor of the Municipality of Kabasalan, Province of Zamboanga del Sur for Three (3) consecutive terms from July 1, 1992 to June 30, 2001 (9 years); He also served as Provincial Board Member representing the Indigenous Peoples of the Province of Zamboanga Sibugay from July 2005 to October, 2012 and was recognized as the FIRST Indigenous Peoples Mandatory Representative (IPMR) of the Philippines in the Provincial level pursuant to RA 8371 otherwise known as the Indigenous Peoples Rights Act of 1997; Founding Chairman of the Provincial Indigenous Peoples' Organization of Zamboanga Sibugay, Inc. (PIPOZSI); Founding Chairman of Subanen Indigenous Peoples Association of the Philippines, Inc. (SIPAP); Founding Chairman of Subanen Partylist of the Philippines; He is the eldest son of late Timuay Langhap Pablo B. Sanggayan of Kabasalan, Zamboanga del Sur.
- Datu Labi Julius Mascarinas Cayon – board member of Zamboanga Sibugay Province And the Son of late Datu Labi JoseLihao Cayon, he is recognized as the Tribal Chieftain not just in Zamboanga Sibugay but entire Region 9 and partly in Region 10. "NCIP" - national commission on indigenous people, record section.
- Datu Lumok Imbing – 2nd cousin of Datu Laparam Talima Danda and a tribal leader from Subanen Tribe, who leads the aborigins of the Municipality of Lapuyan, Zamboanga Del Sur Province.
- Datu Langhap Dacanay – he is the 2nd generation of the royal blood stream and a 3rd degree relative of Datu Wilborne Sanghanan Danda
- Bae Sonita Manda Ryde – the 1st highest women handle the position she was proclaimed by former President Gloria Arroyo, and she is in the 2nd generation royal blood stream a relative of Datu Lamparan T. Danda, Datu Wata Eduardo Lihao Danda and Datu Labi Jose Lihao Cayon.

==== Seignories (Apo) ====
The following are present-day elders in ancestral domains as provided in the 1997 Act No. 8371 of the Republic of the Philippines "to recognise, protect, and promote the rights of the indigenous cultural communities".

- Apo Rodolfo Aguilar – a Tagbanwa sire of Coron island
- Apo Dr. Pio Lledo – a Tagbanwa sire of Calauit island

=== Listings from oral traditions and later histories ===
==== Lordship of Pampanga ====
Name	Title	From	Until	Events
Macabulos	Datu (Lord)	before 1570	c. 1571	(no given events)

==== Lordship of Taytay ====
Name	Title	From	Until	Events
Kabailo	Datu (Lord)	before 1570	c. 1570	(no given events)

==== Confederation of Majaas ====
These figures are based on Pedro Monteclaro's "Maragtas", a history of Panay published in 1907.

Name	Title	Dominion	From	Until	Events
Puti	Datu (Lord)	Aninipay	c.1200	(no given date)	(no given events)
Sumakwel	Datu (Lord)	Antique	c.1200	(no given date)	Presided over the 10 Bornean lords
Bangkaya	Datu (Lord)	Kalibo	c.1200	(no given date)	(no given events)
Dumangsol	Datu (Lord)	Malandug	c.1200	(no given date)	(no given events)
Dumangsil	Datu (Lord)	Taal	c.1200	(no given date)	(no given events)
Lubay	Datu (Lord)	Malandug	c.1200	(no given date)	(no given events)
Paiburong	Datu (Lord)	Irong-Irong	c.1200	(no given date)	(no given events)
Paduhinog	Datu (Lord)	Malandug	c.1200	(no given date)	(no given events)
Dumalugdog	Datu (Lord)	Malandug	c.1200	(no given date)	(no given events)
Balensukla	Datu (Lord)	Taal	c.1200	(no given date)	(no given events)
Marikudo	Datu (Lord)	Panay	(no given date)	c.1200	Aeta (Ati) Lord of Panay; sold the lowlands of the island to the 10 Bornean lords in exchange for a golden salakot (bulawan nga saduk) and a long pearl necklace that could touch the ground (manangyad)

==== Lordship of Marawi ====
Name	Title	From	Until	Events
Sanday	Datu (Lord)	(no given date)	(no given date)	(no given events)

== See also ==
- President of the Philippines
- Governor General of the Philippines
- Heads of state and government of the Philippines
- List of sovereign state leaders in the Philippines
- List of ancient Philippine consorts
- Filipino styles and honorifics
- Indian honorifics, Filipino, Indonesian, Malay and Thai titles originated from these
- Thai honorifics
- Thai royal ranks and titles
- Malay styles and titles
- Indonesian honorifics
- Greater India
- Indosphere
