= List of ancient Philippine consorts =

This is a list of the queen consorts of the major kingdoms and states that existed in present-day Philippines. Only the senior queens—i.e. those with the rank of Dayang ("Lady") and Lakambini ("Queen")—are listed.

== Rankings of consorts ==
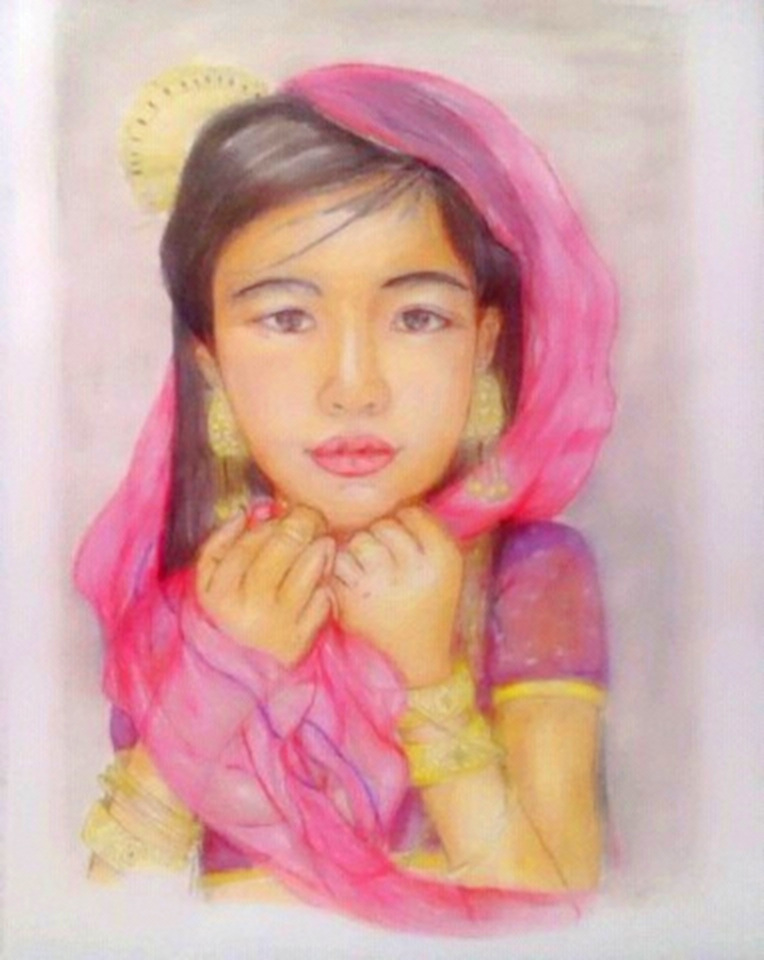
Painting of a young woman of the Noble Maginoo caste adorned with gold ornaments.

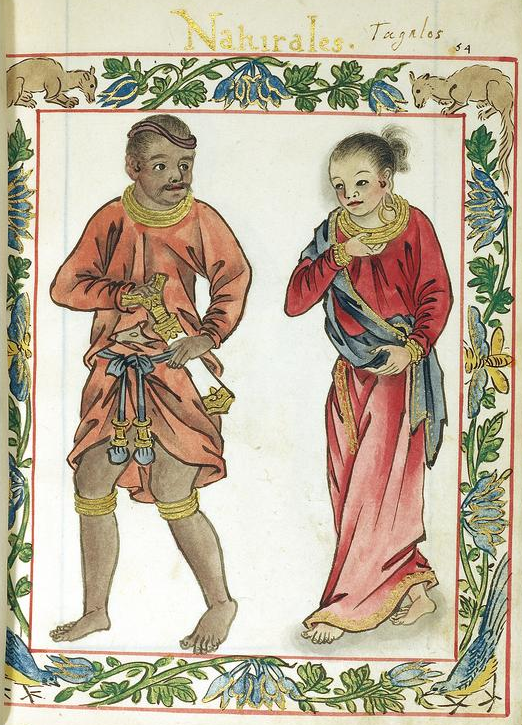
A Tagalog couple belong to Maginoo caste.

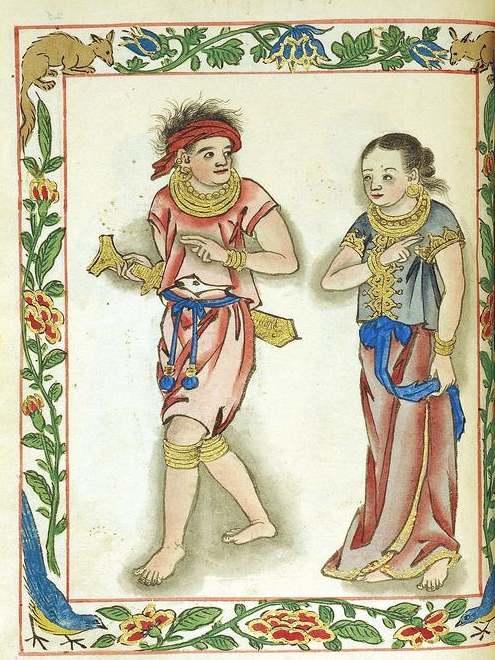
A noble couple in Visayas.

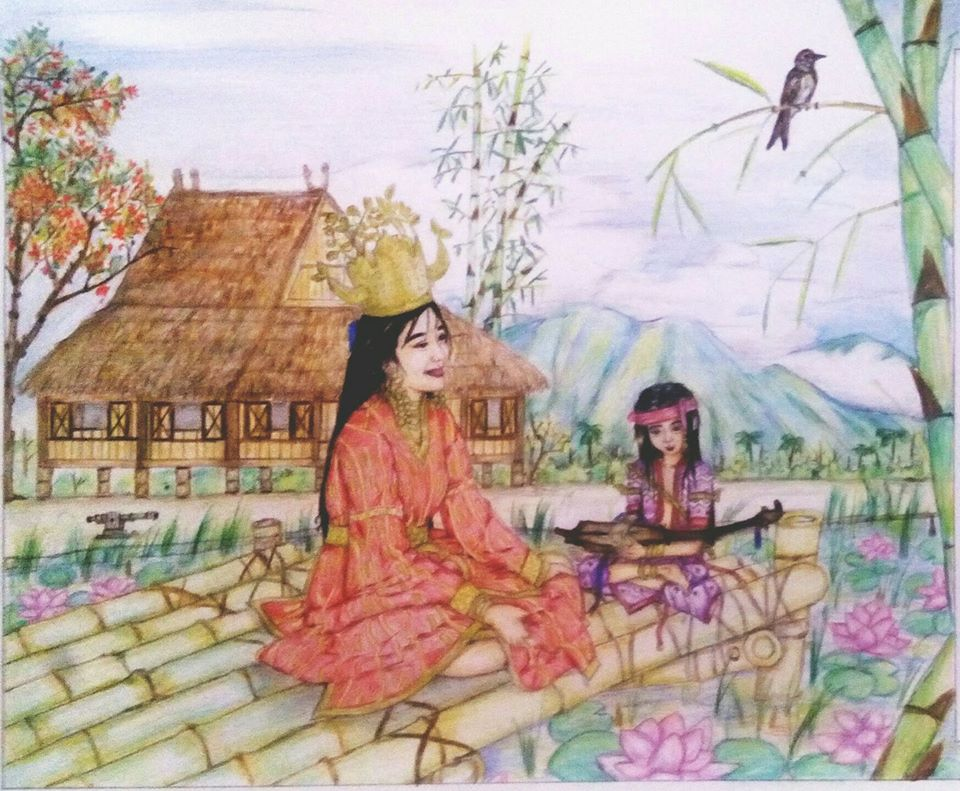
The painting of a young mother and her child which belong in Maginoo caste and their abode which is the Torogan in the background.

Prior to the Archaic epoch (c. 900–1565), the consorts of the Filipino monarchs were organized in three general tiers: Dayang (ᜇᜌᜅ᜔), Lakambini (ᜎᜃᜋ᜔ᜊᜒᜈᜒ), and Binibini (ᜊᜒᜈᜒ ᜊᜒᜈᜒ), or even the word Hara (ᜑᜇ) is a Malayo-Sanskrit terms in which referred to a Queen in western sense, also meant the chief queen of the states and polities which is in the influence of India or Animist states (see also Indianized kingdoms).

The title Sultana or sultanah is an Islamic title and a feminine form of the word Sultan. This term has been legally used for some Muslim women monarchs and sultan's consorts. Nevertheless, westerners have used the title to refer to Muslim women monarchs specially in the southern part of the Philippines, which is in the Islamic influence (like Sulu and Maguindanao), sultan's women relatives who don't hold this title officially.

| Rank | Title in Baybayin / Arabic-Jawi | Description |
|---|---|---|
| Hara | (Tagalog: ᜑᜇ) | Queen consort of a Raja |
| Dayang | (Tagalog: ᜇᜌᜅ᜔) | Court lady or a female Chief spouse of Datu |
| Lakambini | (Tagalog: ᜎᜃᜋ᜔ᜊᜒᜈᜒ) | Queen of the Palace or Chief Consort of Lakan |
| Binibini | (Tagalog: ᜊᜒᜈᜒᜊᜒᜈᜒ) | A Princess also a Court lady |
| Dayang-dayang | (Tagalog: ᜇᜌᜅ᜔ ᜇᜌᜅ᜔, Arabic: دايڠ دايڠ) | A Princess also a Court lady later become Queen consort of a Sultan or a Raja in Mindanao |
| Sultana | Arabic: سلطانه (sulṭānah) | An Islamic title and a feminine form of the word Sultan. This term has been legally used for some Muslim women monarchs and sultan's consorts. Nevertheless, westerners have used the title to refer to Muslim women monarchs and sultan's women relatives who don't hold this title officially. |

== List of consorts ==
=== Legendary consorts ===
- Legendary consorts and their husbands are mentioned in the folktales and oral traditions.

| Image | Consort | Rank | Became consort | Ceased to be consort | Spouse | Notes |
|---|---|---|---|---|---|---|
| | Maria Makiling | Dayang | legendary | legendary | Captain Lara; Joselito and Juan | Maria Makiling is the guardian spirit of the mountain, responsible for protecting its bounty and thus, is also a benefactor for the townspeople who depend on the mountain's resources. In addition to being a guardian of the Mount Makiling, some legends also identify Laguna de Bay - and the fish caught from it - as part of her domain. |
| | Magayon | Princess | legendary | legendary | a Tagalog Prince Pagtuga (eruption) | (transl. Lady Beautiful) is the heroine that appears in the legend of Mt. Mayon in Albay. |

=== Tondo (historical polity) ===
| Consort | Rank | Became consort | Spouse | Notes |
|---|---|---|---|---|
| Angkatan | Dayang | c. 900 | Namwaran | Known in LCI. |
| Buka | Dayang | c. 900 | Jayadewa | Known in LCI. She was married to Senapati Jayadewa, as a bargain to clear the debt of 1 kati and 8 suwarnas of her parents Namwaran and Dayang Angkatan. |
| Dayang Kalangitan | Gat | Unknown | Gat Lontok | The co-ruler of Pasig with Gat Lontok. |
| Panginoan | Dayang | Unknown | Gat Balagtas of Sapa and Taal, Batangas | In oral tradition recounted by Nick Joaquin and Leonardo Vivencio, "Princess Panginoan of Pasig" who was married by Balagtas, the son of Emperor Soledan of Majapahit in 1300 AD in an effort consolidate rule of Namayan. |
| Lahat | Dayang | Unknown | Gat Timog | Daughter of Kalangitan and married Gat Timog. |

=== Namayan ===
| Consort | Rank | Became consort | Spouse | Notes |
|---|---|---|---|---|
| Maylac | Dayang | | Arao | Spouse of Principal Arao, mother of Gat Lontok of Pasig. |
| Sasanban | Princess or Lady | c. 1300 (according to folk tradition cited by Joaquin and Vicencio) Batangueño folk tradition (cited by Odal-Devora, 2000) | Emperor Soledan | In folk tradition recounted by Nick Joaquin and Leonardo Vivencio, a "lady of Namayan" who went to the Madjapahit court to marry Emperor Soledan, eventually giving birth to Balagtas, who then returned to Namayan/Pasig in 1300. |
| Panginoan | Dayang | Unknown | Gat Balagtas of Sapa and Taal, Batangas | In oral tradition recounted by Nick Joaquin and Leonardo Vivencio, "Princess Panginoan of Pasig" who was married by Balagtas, the son of Emperor Soledan of Madjapahit in 1300 in an effort consolidate rule of Namayan. |

=== Maynila (historical polity) ===
| Consort | Rank | Became consort | Ceased to be consort | Spouse | Notes |
|---|---|---|---|---|---|
| Unknown | Hara | c.1400s or 1500 | 1521 | | Firsthand accounts generally accepted by Philippine historiographers, although with corrections for hispanocentric bias subject to scholarly peer review. The veracity of "quasi-historical" (meaning not physically original) genealogical documents also remains subject to scholarly peer review. She served as Paramount ruler of Manila after the death of her husband. Her period of reign covered the youth of Rajah Matanda, including the time Ache spent as commander of the Bruneian navy. |
| Leila Menchanai | Puteri | 1485 (husband's reign) | 1524 (husband's reign) | Bolkiah | She is a princess of Sulu who is the spouse of Sultan Bolkiah who invaded and conquered Sulu and Selurong in the 15th century. |
| Unknown | Dayang or Sultana | Mid to late 16th century | 1571 | Rajah Sulayman | An unnamed spouse and cousin of Rajah Sulayman of Maynila. |

=== Cebu (historical polity) ===
| Consort | Rank | Became consort | Ceased to be consort | Spouse | Notes |
|---|---|---|---|---|---|
| Humamay or Humamai | Hara | Before 1521 (husband's reign) | After 1521 (husband's reign) | Rajah Humabon | Later changed its name to Juana after she converted to Roman Catholic. |

=== Bo-ol ===
| Consort | Rank | Became consort | Ceased to be consort | Spouse | Notes |
|---|---|---|---|---|---|
| Bugbung Humasanum | Dayang (Princess) | c. 12th century | Unknown (husband's reign) | Datu Sumanga | Datu Sumanga raids China to win the hand of Dayang-dayang Bugbung Humasanum. |

=== Sultanate of Maguindanao ===
| Consort | Rank | Became consort | Ceased to be consort | Spouse | Notes |
|---|---|---|---|---|---|
| Three (3) named consorts: Angintabo; Simbaan; Masawang | Dayang-dayang | 1520 (husband's reign) | 1543 (husband's reign) | Sharif Kabungsuwan | A daughter of Macaapun Rajah, A princess from Malabang and Angintabo's niece. |
| Unknown Princess | Dayang-dayang | ? (husband's reign) | ? | Sharif Kabungsuwan | A daughter of Macaapun Rajah. |
| Daragat | Dayang | | | ? | The daughter of Sharif Kabungsuwan. |

=== Sultanate of Sulu ===
| Consort | Rank | Became consort | Ceased to be consort | Spouse | Notes |
|---|---|---|---|---|---|
| Paramisuli | Dayang-dayang | c. 17 November 1405 | ? | Sharif ul-Hāshim of Sulu | |
| Tuambaloka | Dayang-dayang | 1649 | 1650 | Rajah Bongso | A woman from Basilan who ascended to power and become the Queen consort of Jolo known for her bravery as she and her husband held of the invaders with 4,000 warriors. |
| Piandao Kiram | Hadji Dayang-dayang | | | Muedzul Lail Tan Kiram | |
| Tarhata Kiram | Hadji Dayang-dayang | | | | |
| Emraida Kiram | Hadji Dayang-dayang | | | | 1967 Miss World |

== See also ==
- First Lady or First Gentleman of the Philippines
- Binukot - Filipino cultural practice that secludes a young person (usually a young woman)
- History of the Philippines (900–1521)
- List of sovereign state leaders in the Philippines
- List of recorded Datus in the Philippines
- Filipino styles and honorifics
- Greater India
