= Dayang Kalangitan =

Kalangitan
- Dayang of Pasig
- Spouse: Gat Lontok
- Issue: Dayang Panginoan; Dayang Lahat; Rajah Salalila; Gat Kahiya
Names
- ᜃᜎᜅᜒᜆ; Kalangitan; Cálan͠gúitán
- House: Pasig
- Religion: Anitism

Dayang Kalangitan (Baybayin: ᜃᜎᜅᜒᜆᜈ᜔ , Abecedario: Cálan͠gúitán) is a legendary figure in early Philippine history who was said to be Dayang of the precolonial Indianized polity of Pasig. She was co-ruler of Pasig with her husband, Gat Lontok. She is one of the very few known female leaders in precolonial Philippine history.

== Life ==
She was mentioned in the Will of Fernando Malang Balagtas (1589). Dayang Kalangitan was married to Gat Lontok. Together with her husband, Kalangitan ruled over the area around Pasig. Throughout her life, she had four children, who were Panginoan, Lahat, Salalila, and Kahiya. Her daughter Dayang Panginoan was married to Prince Balagtas, the son of Emperor Soledan and Empress Sasanban of Sapa.

Her son, Salalila became ruler of Maynila; and after converting to Islam, he adopted his more famous name, Sulaiman. Tondo and Maynila became separate kingdoms after Kalangitan. Tondo was ruled by Salalila's eldest son, Lakandula and Maynila by Rajah Matanda and Rajah Sulayman.

== In popular media ==
=== Literature ===
- Kalangitan is a novel written by A.F. Eleazar. The plot revolves around a princess named Kalangitan, who became the Queen regnant of Namayan, Tondo, and on her realm at Bitukang Manok, which is the seat of power. As described on the novel, Kalangitan is the most powerful woman in the Maisung at the time of her reign. The novel tackled the history of pre-Hispanic Philippines and the tradition of monogamy, justice system, culture and social norms. The main gist of the novel is about feminism during the pre-colonial era as it shows on the way it was written. It also explores the genre of Philippine mythology, epic and legends. It also contains allegories and sublimal messages as seen on the succeeding chapters of the book.

== See also ==
- List of ancient Philippine consorts
- Tondo (historical polity)
- Pasig
- Namayan
- Precolonial barangay

Regnal titles
Preceded by Araw and Maylak	Dayang of Pasig	Succeeded by Rajah Salalila
