= Kalangitan =

Novel by A.F Eleazar

- Author: A.F.Eleazar
- Original title: Ang nag-iisang Reyna ng Kalangitan
- Language: Tagalog, Malay, Arabic
- Genre: Novel
- Publication place: Philippines

Kalangitan is a Philippine Historical Fiction Novel written by A.F. Eleazar. The plot revolves around a princess named Dayang Kalangitan who became the Queen Regnant of Namayan, Teunduk, and Meneuk kingdom. As described on the novel, Kalangitan is the most powerful woman in the Maisung at the time of her reign. The novel tackled the history of pre-Hispanic Philippines and the tradition of monogamy, justice system, culture and social norms. The main gist of the novel is about feminism during the pre-colonial era as it shows on the way it was written. It also explore the genre of Philippine mythology, epic and legends. It also contains allegories and subliminal messages as seen on the succeeding chapters of the book. The story was set in Manila during 1450 A.D.

== List of Characters ==
=== Main characters ===
- Dayang Kalangitan/ Reyna Kalangitan - the protagonist on the novel and depicted as the "Heavenly Queen From the Skies". She also became the first queen ever ruled the three kingdoms of Manila after his consort dies.
- Gat Lontok - He is the lover and the consort of Kalangitan and died due to the War of Mactan.
- Lady Tinuran - She is the queen dowager from the Kingdom of Haveria and the protagonist on the novel. Well versed with Gaway and Licouneh (Potions, spell and black curse).
- Dayang Pas-i - The step sister of Kalangitan and seems to be unwanted by the society as she was committed a Ravento (curse) to the land of Barashan.

=== Supporting characters ===
- Sultan Bolkian (Father of Dayang Udama, Ruler of the Sultanate of Borneo)
- Lady Buan (Mother of Kalangitan)
- Rajah Gambang (The King of Teunduk, Father of Kalangitan)
- Data Bantigan (The Mother of Dayang Pas-i)
- Ganbontok (The Walir, The Father of Lady Buan)
- Rajah Timatimakum (The Spouse of Dayang Pas-i)
- Pasondong, Dimana, Gintuan (The Offspring of Lady Tinuran to her three Spouses)
- Sultan Bungkos I (The First spouse of Tinuran)
- Gat Makisig (The Second spouse of Tinuran, killed by poisoning)
- Rajah Matanda (The Third Spouse of Tinuran)
- Butwan- (The First Spouse of Lady Buan, A warrior)
- Rajah Imig-(Grandfather of Gat Lontok)
- Rajah Yikis-(Father of Gat Lontok)
- Matok-(The Son of Tinuran, Master of All Warriors)

=== Recurring Characters ===
- Luwalhati- A servant who will escape the Crown Prince, Gubatan the Child of Queen Kalangitan during the war between the Namayan Kingdom and May-i.
- Gubatan- The crown prince of Kingdom of Namayan, Teunduk, and Meneuk. He will be the successor of Queen Kalangitan.
- Handong- Husband of Luwalhati
- Amino- The Mysterious Warrior
- Irogan- Sister of Luwalhati

=== Mythical Characters, Religion, Others ===
- Kabunian- (God/Creator)
- Sisiburanen- (God of Darkness)
- Alon- (God of the Seas)
- Sarimanok- (The mythical bird/ Royal emblem of Sugbu)
- Batuk- Tattoo
- Sugbu- Now Cebu
- Teunduk- Now Kingdom of Tondo
- Namayan- Now Sta.Ana, Manila
- Dian Lamitan- God of Love
- Kaayusang Adlaw- Solar System

== Book Two: Ang Gintong Dakilang Prinsipe ==
Ang Gintong Dakilang Prinsipe is the second prequel novel of Kalangitan, it depicts the story of Gubatan, a prince, the son of Kalangitan, who will become the king of the three kingdoms.
