= Namayan, Mandaluyong =

Barangay in Mandaluyong, Metro Manila, Philippines

Namayan
- Barangay
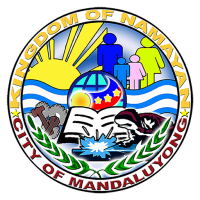
- Seal
- Motto: "Tara Na Isang Namayan Tayo!"; English: "Come On We Are One Namayan!"
- Location of Namayan, Mandaluyong in Metro Manila
- Coordinates: 14°34′51.76″N 121°1′11.61″E
- Country: Philippines
- Region: Metro Manila
- City: Mandaluyong

Government
  - Type: Sangguniang Barangay
  - Barangay Captain: Victor Emmanuel Francisco Jr. (PFP)
  - SK Chairman: Maverick Ross A. Solano (BN)

Area
  - Total: 0.3855 km^{2} (0.1488 sq mi)

Population (2020)
  - Total: 7,670
  - Density: 19,900/km^{2} (51,500/sq mi)
- Demonym: Namayaneño
- Time zone: UTC+8 (Philippine Standard Time)
- Postal code: 1551

Namayan is a barangay in the city of Mandaluyong, Philippines. It is located in the western part of the city near the border with Santa Ana, Manila and Kasilawan and Carmona, Makati, separated from them by the Pasig River. The barangay covers an area of 38.55 hectares (95.3 acres), and is bordered by the barangays of Mabini–J.Rizal and Old Zañiga on the northside, and Vergara on the eastside. According to the 2020 census, it has a population of 7,670 people.

Namayan was the center of a pre-Hispanic kingdom that covered much of the modern city of Manila and surrounding cities in southern and eastern Metro Manila. It was also spelled as Lamayan.

== Education ==
Namayan has one public school, Doña Basilisa Yangco Elementary School, and one daycare school, Namayan Daycare Center.

== Landmarks ==
There are many landmarks in Namayan, the most notable landmarks being the Namayan Park (which houses the Offices of the Barangay Council, the Hardin ni Sotera, and the Narciso Bernardo Arena), and the Most Sacred Heart of Jesus Chapel.

== See also ==
- Administrative divisions of Metro Manila
