= Empress Sasanban =

Legendary lady of Sapa in modern-day Manila, Philippines

Sasanban
- Empress
- Reign: 15th century
- Spouse: Emperor Soledan
- Issue: Prince Balagtas
- House: Sapa

In oral traditions associated with the early history of the Tagalog people, Empress Sasanban or Dayang Sasanban (Baybayin: ᜐᜐᜊᜈ᜔), also spelled as Sasaban is said to have been a 14th or 15th century Empress of Sapa, on the Pasig River in Luzon. She was first mentioned in the Will of Fernando Malang Balagtas, a disputed will that dates back to either 1539 or 1589, as the wife of Emperor Soledan of Sapa and the mother of Prince Balagtas, who eventually succeeded to the throne.

== Claims ==
According to writer Nick Joaquin, she leaves Namayan to marry to an "Emperor Soledan" (also identified as "Anka Widyaya") of the Majapahit. At the Majapahit court, she gives birth to a son named Balagtas, who eventually returns to Luzon to rule over Balayan and Taal and marry Princess Panginoan of Pasig. However, there is no mention of her in the Nagarakretagama, thus her association with the Majapahit is unsure.

== See also ==
- Namayan
- Dayang Kalangitan
- Gat Lontok
- Santa Ana, Manila
- Will of Fernando Malang Balagtas
