= Namayan =

Precolonial polity in Manila

Namayan ᜈᜋᜌᜈ᜔ (Baybayin)
- before the 11th century–1520s
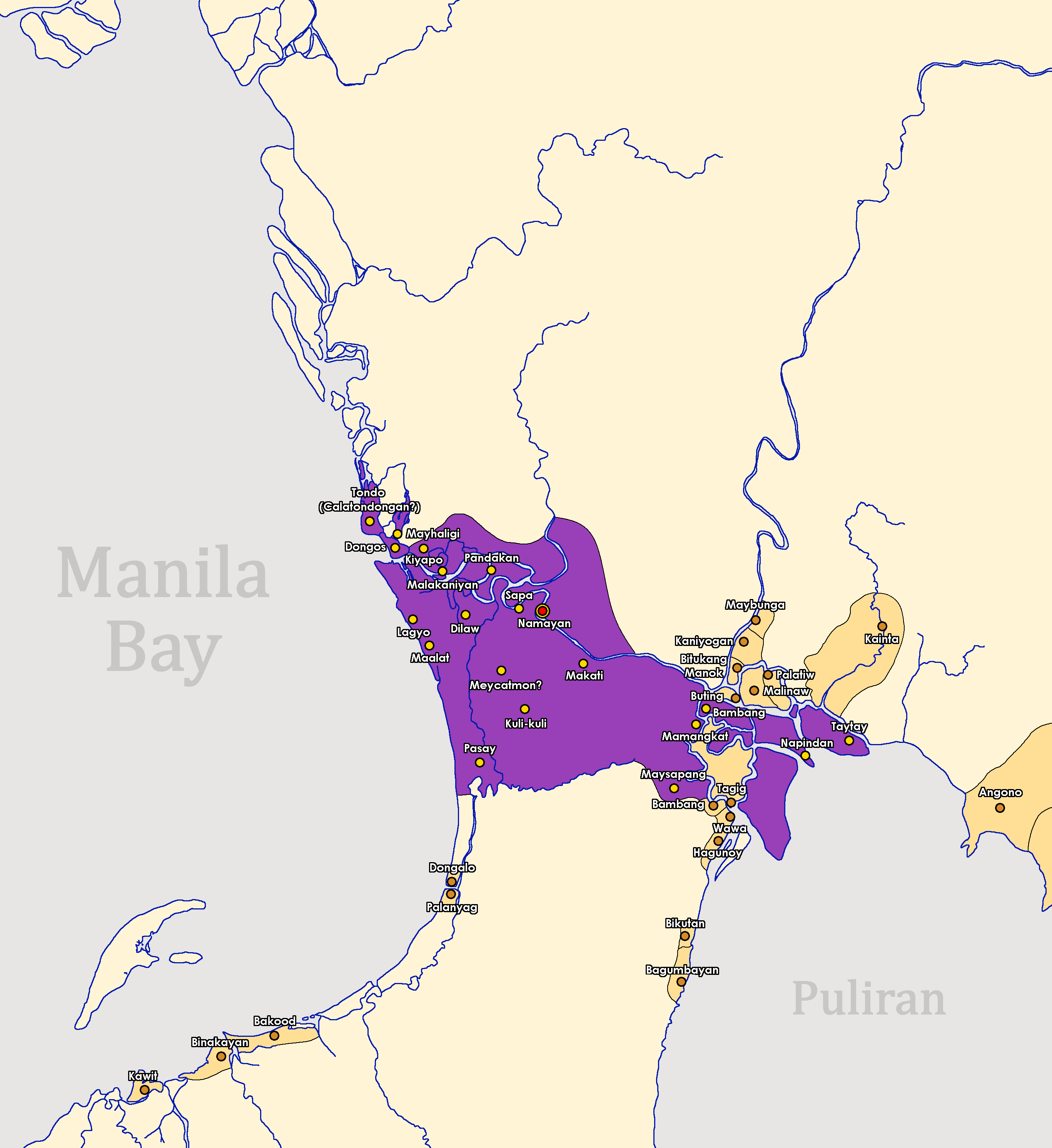
- A reconstructed map of Namayan (magenta) under the rule of Lakantagkan. Locations like Dibag, Pinacauasan and Yamagtogon are missing, while the sites of Meycatmon and Calatondongan are unclear.

- Map of Namayan during the reign of Balagtas in circa 1500, whose territories extended to Kapampangan (Pampanga).
- Status: Precolonial barangay under the house of Lakantagkan
- Capital: Namayan, Mandaluyong and Sapa
- Common languages: Old Tagalog, Old Malay
- Religion: Islam, (Note: Among the royalty, nobility, and some freemen (Scott, 1994).) Tagalog polytheism
- Government: Feudalism under barangay state led by the house of Lakantagkan
- History
  - Established: before the 11th century
  - Conquest by Prince Ache: 1520s
- Currency: Piloncitos and gold rings
Succeeded by
Captaincy General of the Philippines; Manila (province)
- Today part of: Philippines

Namayan (Baybayin: Pre-Kudlit: ᜈᜋᜌ or ᜐᜉ (Sapa), Post-Kudlit: ᜈᜋᜌᜈ᜔), also called Sapa and sometimes Lamayan, was an independent polity on the banks of the Pasig River in the Philippines. It is believed to have peaked in the 11th-14th centuries, although it continued to be inhabited until the arrival of European colonizers in the 1570s.

Formed as a polity occupying several barangays, it was one of several polities on the Pasig River just prior to the Spanish colonization of the Philippines, alongside Tondo, Maynila, and Cainta.

Archeological findings in Santa Ana have produced the oldest evidence of continuous habitation among the Pasig River polities, pre-dating artifacts found within the historical sites of Maynila and Tondo. (Note: Tondo is mentioned in an even older document (the Laguna Copperplate Inscription), however, providing earlier evidence of a polity named "Tondo", even if the artifact was found in a different site.[http://"Postma1992" Postma, Antoon (1992). "The Laguna Copper-Plate Inscription: Text and Commentary". Philippine Studies. Ateneo de Manila University. 40 (2): 182–203.])

== Sources ==
Historians studying Namayan have the advantage of being able to draw both from written sources and from artifacts uncovered in controlled archeological digs.

The most prominent primary written sources regarding precolonial Namayan is "Estado Geográfico, Topográfico, Estadístico, Histórico-Religioso de la Santa y Apostólica Província de San Gregorio Magno", published in 1865 by Franciscan scholar Fr. Félix de Huerta. His description of Namayan included important details such as the extent of Namayan's territories, and the lineage of its rulers.

Controlled archaeological excavations conducted by the National Museum of the Philippines in the 1960s, meantime, produced artifacts from a pre-Hispanic gravesite within the Santa Ana Church complex, providing important information about maritime trade around Southeast Asia and China from 12th to 15th century AD, as well as the elaborate mortuary practices of Namayan's inhabitants.

== Capital sites ==
Three present-day locations are identified as the political centers of Namayan. Two of these are within the present-day Santa Ana district in Manila, and Barangay Namayan in Mandaluyong across the river from the other sites.

=== Namayan, Mandaluyong ===
Barangay Namayan in Mandaluyong bears the name of the polity, and was believed to be the seat of power of Lakantagkan. However, it was incorporated into Santa Ana de Sapa as a barrio in 1578.

=== Sapa ===
The site most associated with the Namayan polity is the town proper of Santa Ana, which grew around Our Lady of the Abandoned Parish. This site did not become the main settlement until 1578, when Franciscan missionaries built the first church some distance from the original town. Locals referred to the site as "Sapà."

Sapà is the Tagalog and Kapampangan word for a small creek. Nearby bodies of water matching the description include what are now Estero de Tripa de Gallina ("Rooster’s Gut Estuary") and a smaller creek (Estero de Sta. Clara) in the vicinity of the present-day streets of Del Pan, Havana, and Tejerón. However, old Santa Ana was known for being "criss-crossed by brooks and creeks", any number of which could have been obscured by urbanization.

Christianised into Santa Ana de Sapa, the name eventually encompassed the modern Santa Ana district of Manila. De Huerta notes that "this town takes its name from the titular saint and the addition of Sapa for its having been established in a site immediately upon an estuary or rivulet proceeding from the Pasig River, which the natives call Sapa and the name of the town itself."

=== Lamayan ===
Instead of the Sapa site, local traditions say that an area called Lamayan (Tagalog and Kapampangan for "the place where a wake was held"), was situated on the banks of the Pasig itself. It was said to be the site of the ancient capital from which Lakantagkan and Buwan once ruled. It is still recognizable today, as a street in the area still bears its name.

== Territory ==
Namayan's territory has been described bordering Manila Bay, the Pasig River, and Laguna de Bay. A more precise description of Namayan's administrative area is given by Fr. de Huerta, who, noting that Namayan was a confederation of several barangays, identified these component communities as they were named during the mid 19th century.

Most are now districts or barangays within the modern City of Manila:

- Namayan (Lakantagkan's seat of power; modern-day Namayan, Mandaluyong)
- Sapa (now the district of Santa Ana)
- Meycatmon (which literally means "a place with Catmon (Dillenia indica) trees")
- Calatondongan
- Dongos
- Dibag
- Pinacauasan
- Yamagtogon
- Meysapan (now within Ususan, Taguig)
- Malate
- Dilao (Paco)
- Pandacan
- Quiapo
- Sampaloc
- San Miguel

Four settlements are now separate cities in and around Metro Manila:

- San Juan del Monte (now San Juan)
- San Felipe Neri (now Mandaluyong)
- San Pedro de Macati (now Makati)
- Taytay, Rizal

Administrative and political records of Spanish Manila indicate that these settlements mentioned as territories of Namayan were recorded in 1578 as parts and visitas (satellite settlements) of Sta. Ana de Sapa.

A number of these settlements' names are no longer used today, but Philippine National Artist for Literature Nick Joaquin, in his book "Manila My Manila: A History for the Young", says that Namayan's territories included what are now Santa Ana, Quiapo, San Miguel, Sampaloc, Santa Mesa, Paco, Pandacan in Manila; Mandaluyong, San Juan, Makati, Pasay, Pateros, Taguig, Taytay, and Parañaque.

== Economic activities ==
Huerta describes the original settlement in Santa Ana as a fishing village that had other industries including carpentry, masonry, piña (pineapple cloth) embroidery, tinapá, cigars, bricks, sugar and bread.

This contrasts sharply with the economic activities of the contemporaneous polities of Tondo and Maynila, which monopolized the influx of goods coming from China, and monopolized the re-sale of the same Chinese goods to other ports in the archipelago, respectively.

=== Gold as currency ===
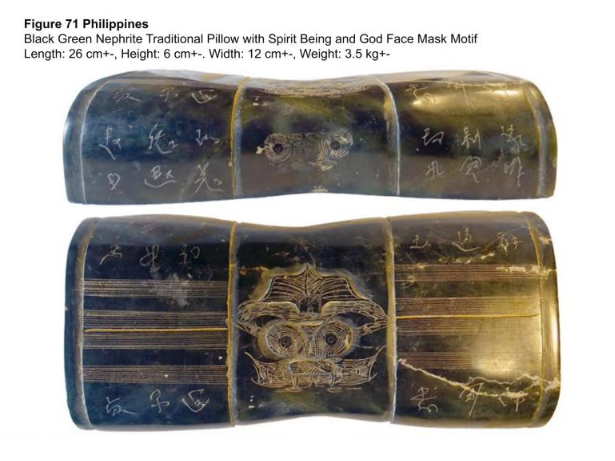
Black Nephrite Jade Pillow with Spirit Face and God Motiff found in the vicinity of what is now Namayan.

The Namayans used Piloncitos, small gold ingots some of the size of a corn kernel—and weighing from 0.09 to 2.65 grams. Large Piloncitos weighing 2.65 grams approximate the weight of one mass. Piloncitos have been excavated from Mandaluyong, Bataan and the banks of the Pasig River.

Other than Piloncitos, the Namayans also used gold rings or gold ring-like ingots. Barter rings were circulated in the Philippines up to the 16th century.

== Rulers ==
Fray Huerta also recorded the genealogy of Namayan's ruling family, tracing it to a Lacantagcan or Lakantagkan, (also spelled Lakan Tagkan or Lakan Takhan, separating Lakan and Tagkan), and his wife Bouan. Under the heading "Santa Ana", he records:

In origin of the natives of this town comes from a ruler ("regulo") called Lacantagcan, and his wife named Bouan, lords ("señores") of the Namayan territories [...] The first Christian name found in the genealogical tree of this great ("gran") family is a certain Martin in this form. Martin, son of Calamayin: Calamayin, son of Laboy, Laboy, son of Palaba, and Palaba, firstborn son of the ruler ("regulo") Lacantagcan and his wife Bouan.

Historian William Henry Scott notes that "Rajah Kalamayin" was the name of the ruler of Namayan at the point of colonial contact in the early 1570s, and Huerta here records that his son was baptized "Martin" upon conversion to Roman Catholicism. Huerta only traces the genealogical tree of Lacantagcan back through Martin, and thus only mentions the eldest of Lacantagcan and Bouan's sons, Palaba. The other four sons of Lacantagcan are not named, and no daughters are mentioned.

Huerta does go on, however, to mention that Lacantagcan had another male son, named Pasay, whose mother was a Bornean slave:

The said Lacantagcan, in addition to five children of his legitimate wife Bouan, had a bastard ("bastardo") with a slave of Bornean lineage ("esclava de casta bornea"), called Pasay, who was the origin of the town known by the same name, for having fixed there his residence as landowner, supported by his father.

While Huerta thus definitively establishes that the rulers of Namayan and the settlement called Pasay were related, the precise nature of their relationship during the 1500s is unclear: Scott records that during that period, Pasay's rulers interacted with the Spanish themselves instead of "Rajah Kalamayin" speaking on their behalf.

Some local oral traditions cite Lakantagkan's child Pasay as a daughter, bestowing her with the title "Dayang-dayang" ("princess"), such as the one cited by Dery (2001), about a princess named Pasay, who married Rajah Sulayman of Maynila. However, the descriptor "bastardo" (bastard), used by Huerta, is masculine in form.

Historian Grace Odal-Devora notes that Kapampangan oral histories also mention a "Sultana Kalangitan", described as "the Lady of the Pasig" who ruled the "Kingdom of Namayan." She is said to have been the grandmother of "Prinsipe Balagtas" (or Bagtas), and the legend says that the Kapampangan people are descended from him. Odal notes that this demonstrates the interconnections of the Tagalog ruling elites.

=== Documented rulers of Namayan ===
The rulers of Namayan from the period of colonial contact (the 1570s) back to three prior generations, were documented by Franciscan Historian Fray Felix Huerta in the work Estado geográfico, topográfico, estadístico, histórico- religioso de la santa y apostólica Provincia de San Gregorio Magno ("Geographical, topographical, statistical, historical and religious state of the holy and apostolic province of St. Gregory the Great"), a record of the histories of Franciscan missions which is now a primary resource for local histories of Philippine municipalities.

Title	Name	Notes	Documented Period of Rule	Primary Sources
Lakantagkan	Actual name not mentioned, possibly Araw	He was referred to as "Lacantagcan" by Huerta and described as the ruler to whom the "original residents" of Namayan trace their origin According to Nick Joaquin, Lakan Tagkan was the descendant of Prince Balagtas, who was the descendant of Emperor Soledan and Empress Sasaban of Sapa. According to Luis Camara Dery (2001), Lakantagkan was also called "Lakan Araw", and his wife Bouan was called "Ma-ilak" or "Maylac".	Exact years not documented; three generations prior to Kalamayin	Huerta
(no title documented by Huerta)	Palaba	He was noted by Huerta as the "Principal Son" of Lakantagkan.	Exact years not documented; two generations prior to Kalamayin	Huerta
(no title documented by Huerta)	Laboy	He was noted by Franciscan genealogical records to be the son of Palaba, and the father of Kalamayin.	Exact years not documented; one generation prior to Kalamayin	Huerta
Rajah	Kalamayin	Referred to by Scott (1994) as Rajah Kalamayin, described as the last ruler of Namayan before the Spanish period.	Immediately prior to and after Spanish colonial contact according to Scott (fl. 1571–1575) (Note: Kalamayin or Calamayin was not mentioned to be the ruler of Namayan who first encountered the Spaniards in Huerta's original work in 1865, but was assumed by William Henry Scott. All that is known was that Martin was the first person in the genealogy of the house of Namayan to be baptized with a Spanish name.)	Huerta
(no title documented by Huerta)	Martin*	Huerta does not mention if Kalamayin's son, baptized "Martin", held a government position during the early Spanish colonial period.	Early Spanish colonial period	Huerta

=== Legendary rulers of Namayan ===
Aside from the records of Huerta, a number of names of rulers are associated with Namayan by folk traditions, as recounted in documents such as the will of Fernando Malang Balagtas (1589) and documented by academics such as Grace Odal-Devora and Luis Camara Dery, as well as writers such as Nick Joaquin.

Title	Name	Notes	Period of Rule	Primary Sources
Emperor	Soledan	According to the Will of Fernando Malang Balagtas cited by Luis Camara Dery (2001), he was the Emperor of Sapa who ruled with Empress Sasanban and had a child named Balagtas who succeeded him. He also had two children, namely Liquiao and Manduquit, who accompanied Balagtas to Kapampangan (Pampanga). According to Joaquin, Vicencio and Odal-Devora, Soledan was an Emperor of Majapahit rather than of Sapa, although this information is neither included in Balagtas' will nor other sources.	Legendary antiquity	Will of Fernando Malang Balagtas (cited by Dery, 2001) Work by Odal-Devora, 2000
Empress	Sasanban	According to the Will of Fernando Malang Balagtas cited by Luis Camara Dery (2001), she was the wife of Emperor Soledan of Sapa and mother of Prince Balagtas. Nick Joaquin and Leonardo Vicencio further elaborated by stating that she went to the Majapahit court to marry Soledan, eventually giving birth to Balagtas, who then returned to Namayan/Pasig in 1300. According to Odal-Devora, Soledan eventually ascended the Majapahit throne and became emperor shortly after the marriage, which elevated Sasaban into an empress.	Legendary antiquity	Will of Fernando Malang Balagtas (cited by Dery, 2001) Works by Odal-Devora, Joaquin and Vicencio
Prince	Bagtas or Balagtas	According to the Will of Fernando Malang Balagtas cited by Luis Camara Dery (2001), he was the son of Emperor Soledan and Empress Sasanban of Sapa, who married Panginoan, daughter of Lontok and Kalangitan. He eventually took the throne of Sapa/Namayan. Academics such as Odal-Devora, Nick Joaquin and Leonardo Vicencio claim that he was a Majapahit prince and son of Emperor Soledan and Empress Sasanban who married Princess Panginoan and co-ruled Sapa/Namayan with her in order to consolidate his family line and rule of Namayan. He was also claimed to have been the primogenitor of a large portion of the Kapampangan people and also may influenced Bulacan and Batangas as the two provinces had places called Balagtas. Odal-Devora however claims that the perceived influence of Balagtas' over Batangas stems from the myth that the 'Kingdom of Bae' was originally in Balayan and Taal. According to Joaquin, Balagtas was the ancestor of Lakantagkan. However, Dery claims that Lakantagkan preceded Balagtas. In another claim by Odal-Devora, he was the grandson of 'Sultana Kalangitan', but the will of Fernando Malang Balagtas cited by Dery claims that he is the son-in-law of Kalangitan.	Legendary antiquity Somewhere in 1335–1380 according to Joaquin and Vicencio||Will of Fernando Malang Balagtas (cited by Dery, 2001) Works by Odal-Devora, Joaquin and Vicencio	
"Princess" or "Lady" (term used in folk tradition, as documented by Odal-Devora)	Panginoan	She was a daughter of Lontok and Kalangitan who eventually married Prince Balagtas and co-ruled Namayan with him.	Legendary antiquity	Will of Fernando Malang Balagtas (cited by Dery, 2001) Works by Odal-Devora, Joaquin and Vicencio

=== Nobles associated with Namayan ===
Apart from rulers, there were also many important nobles who are commonly associated with Sapa or Namayan through familial ties by consanguinity or by affinity, primarily through marriage.

Title	Name	Notes	Period of Rule	Primary Sources
Principal	Lontok	According to the Will of Fernando Malang Balagtas cited by Luis Camara Dery (2001), he was the son of Lakantagkan/Arao and Buwan/Maylac, who married Kalangitan and co-ruled Pasig with her. Odal-Devora refers to Lontok as a 'chief' and states that according to legend, that he was originally based in the 'Kingdom of Bae' in Balayan and Taal before marrying Kalangitan of Pasig, although this was a claim exclusively made by her. According to both the will and in the works of Joaquin and Odal-Devora, they had a daughter named Panginoan who married Prince Balagtas, the future ruler of Namayan.	Legendary antiquity	Will of Fernando Malang Balagtas (cited by Dery, 2001) Work by Odal-Devora, 2000
Dayang or Sultana	Kalangitan	According to the Will of Fernando Malang Balagtas cited by Luis Camara Dery (2001), she was a lady (noble) of the Pasig who married Lontok, the son of Arao and Maylac. According to Odal-Devora, Kalangitan was a lady from Pasig who eventually married Lontok. She also states that he was the grandmother of Prince Balagtas although this contradicts the will of Fernando Malang Balagtas. According to both the will and in the works of Joaquin and Odal-Devora, they had a daughter named Panginoan who married Prince Balagtas, the future ruler of Namayan.	Legendary antiquity	Will of Fernando Malang Balagtas (cited by Dery, 2001) Work by Odal-Devora, 2000

== Downfall and colonization by Spain ==
It is unclear what happened to Sapa was before 1578. Historians such as William Henry Scott presumed that Namayan continued to exist under the rule of Rajah Kalamayin. However, more recent studies such as the study by Ian Christopher Alfonso suggests that Sapa was subjugated and absorbed by Maynila after Prince Ache returned to Luzon from Brunei following a conflict with his cousin who ruled Tondo, who also had apparent ties to the royals of Sapa. From then on, there were no mentions of Namayan or Sapa in Spanish records until later in 1578 when the parish of Santa Ana de Sapa was founded by the Franciscan missionaries who chose to build their church in the area, and eventually another settlement, some distance away from the ancient town. The result is that the present-day Santa Ana is no longer located at the original site. This has raised some questions about pre-colonial graves that have recently been excavated near the Santa Ana church.

== See also ==
- Maynila (historical polity)
- Tondo (historical polity)
- Cainta (historical polity)
- Will of Fernando Malang Balagtas
- Hinduism in the Philippines
- History of the Philippines (900–1521)
- Tagalog people
- History of Luzon
