= Rajah Salalila =

16th-century Pengiran of Brunei and

Seri Laila
- Rajah of Maynila
- Born: 15th century
- Spouse: Princess Ysmeria (name based on oral tradition)
- Issue: Ache; Bunao; Ladiamora (unnamed)
- House: House of Bolkiah
- Religion: Sunni Islam

Seri Laila, or Salalila in Spanish records, was the first ruler of Maynila. His name is now often found as the surname "Salalila" from Tagalog and Kapampangan regions of Luzon in the Philippines.

Based on perceived similarities between the names, he is sometimes also called Sulaiman I (Abecedario: Súláiman, from Arabic: sulaiman سليمان) in the belief that he shared the name of his supposed grandson, Rajah Sulayman.

Oral traditions cited by Odal-Devora (2000) identify him as a son of the legendary Dayang Kalangitan and Gat Lontok. Genealogical traditions cited by Majul (1973) claim that he converted to Islam from the Tagalog religion as a result of the missionary efforts of the Sultanate of Brunei.

Salalila's rule ended when according to Prince Ache, he supposedly died sometime in the early 1500s, and was succeeded by his wife, who was not named in historical accounts. By 1570, his son Ache had succeeded to the position himself, and had come to be known as "Rajah Matanda" (lit. "Old Rajah").

== Sources ==
Little is known for sure about Salalila due to the lack of firsthand documentary sources covering the timeframe of his life and reign. The little that is known for certain by scholars comes from the account given by his son "Prince" Ache (Note: "Prince" was a title the Spanish used to describe Ache, since he was the son of the Paramount ruler of Maynila. It is unknown what exact local title Ache used to introduce himself to the Spanish.) to Sebastian Elcano and the other surviving members of the Magellan expedition in 1521. Some additional details can be gleaned from extant genealogical sources, such as the "Lakandula documents" deposited at the Philippine National Archives but these accounts are often conflicting and present conflicts interest. As a result, the factuality and accuracy of the details presented in these documents requires careful assessment by historiographers.

== Name ==
=== Identification in historical documents as "Salalila" ===
The records of Ache's 1521 account before the crew of Sebastian Elcano's expedition did not identify Salalila by name. However, he is referred to using the name "Salalila" in the "Lakandula documents" deposited at the Philippine National Archives, as well as by apocryphal sources, such as the alleged 1539 "Will of Pansomun".

=== Sulaiman theory ===
His supposed identification as "Sulaiman I" was presented as a theory in the 1950s, based on the similarities of "Salalila" and "Suleiman". However, this identification is the subject of debate among present-day historiographers.

== Known relations ==
=== Legendary claims ===
According to the Will of Fernando Malang Balagtas, which was said to have been written either in 1539 or 1589, Salalila was a son of Gat Lontok and Dayang Kalangitan of Pasig.

=== Historically documented relations ===
A number of Salalila's relations are documented in Ache (Rajah Matanda)'s 1521 account. This includes:

- Ache (Rajah Matanda), Salalila's son – Self-acknowledged to be Salalila's son
- Salalila's widow, Ache's mother – Not specifically named in the 1521 accounts of Aganduru Moriz, Gines de Mafra or Antonio Pigafetta, but sometimes named "Dayang Ysmeria" in 20th century folk traditions. (Note: This "20th century folk tradition" consists of traditions recorded on early local government websites, whose provenance cannot be definitively traced to earlier than the 20th century.)
- Ache's "cousin", the ruler of Tondo – Presumably also related to Salalila, this cousin is believed to be roughly Ache's age, but had already become Lakan of Tondo by 1521, when he was allegedly encroaching on the territory of Maynila, then ruled by Ache's mother. It is not known if "cousin" is a precise term, or a general term meaning a "relative".
- The Sultan of Brunei, Ache's "grandfather" – The 1521 accounts all specify that Ache had run away from Maynila as a young man to seek the political and military support of his grandfather, the Sultan of Brunei, against the Lakandula of Tondo. Salalila's exact relationship (by consanguinity or by affinity) with this Sultan of Brunei is not specified in the extant accounts, and it is not known if "grandfather" is a precise term, or a general term meaning an "ancestor".
- Rajah Sulayman – According to the genealogical research done by Luis Camara Dery, investigating the National Archives' "Lakandula documents" in particular, Ache is believed to have had an unnamed younger brother, who became the father of the Rajah Sulayman, who met De Goiti and Legaspi in 1570–71. Some 20th century traditions name this younger brother Suleiman II, with the Sulayman of the 1570s supposedly being Suleiman III. However, the provenance of these traditions is unclear.

== Death and succession ==
According to Ache's 1521 account, Salalila died while Ache was still very young, and was succeeded by his wife, who was not named in the accounts. By 1570, Salalila's wife had died and Ache had succeeded to Salalila's position himself, and introduced himself as "Rajah Matanda" to the forces of Martin de Goiti (in 1570) and Miguel López de Legazpi (in 1571).

== See also ==
- History of the Philippines (900–1521)
- Bolkiah
- Cainta (historical polity)
- Paramount rulers in early Philippine history
- Indian cultural influences in early Philippine polities

Regnal titles
Preceded by Dayang Kalangitan	Rajah of Maynila c. early 1500s	Succeeded by Dayang dayang Ysmeria (according to oral traditions)
