= Sinhala honorifics =

Linguistic feature

In the Sinhalese language, it is almost always compulsory for the speaker or writer to take into account the importance of the subject and of the object when constructing a sentence. Sinhalese uses a vast collection of honorifics to reflect the speaker's relationship with the subject and object of the sentence, and it also reveals the level of importance the society or the writer has given to them. In the present stage of the language, honorifics are mostly used in the literary language as opposed to in the vernacular, and their use is being gradually limited to only formal occasions.

== Noun Honorifics ==
=== Inanimate Nouns ===
When talking about an object that holds superiority or importance, or an object which has been given superior status, these honorifics are used. They can only be used in the literary language and play an essential part in Sinhala literature. Usually, the word is replaced by its "tatsama" counterpart for this, as in the word කෑම-kǣma (food) becomes the tatsama word භෝජන-bhōjana (food) just to emphasize the given importance. The honorifics හු-hu and ඕ-ō are usually used after this in plural form and the verb also is changed accordingly to its plural form, something that is not done to normal inanimate plurals. This changes the perspective of the object to the state the writer has given it, and thus advocates more beauty and grandeur to the sentence.

තරු අහසේ දිදුලයි.
tharu ahasē điđulayi.
the stars shine in the sky (singular)

තාරකාවෝ අහසේ දිදුලති
thārakāwō ahasē điđulathi
the stars[honorific] shine in the sky (plural)

When referring to the religious and holy objects or relics in Sinhala, the honorific වහන්සේ-wahansē is sometimes used.

දළඳා වහන්සේ
đaļaňđā wahansē
the tooth relic of Lord Buddha

වෙහෙර වහන්සේ
wehera wahansē
the stupa

දෙවියන් වහන්සේ
Deviyan wahanse
God

=== Animate Nouns ===
A legion of honorifics are in use in the present Sinhala language to accentuate the social and ethical importance of the people the speaker or writer is addressing. Generally, elders, teachers, strangers, political/spiritual leaders, renowned people and customers in the Sinhala society are referred to with honorifics, while the younger people and students are not. The incorrect use of honorifics can lead to confusions, and are often thought as sarcastic remarks.

Ex: When calling someone younger than you as ඔබ තුමා-oba thumā it can mean that you are sarcastic about the younger one's boastful and prejudiced attitude.

The most common honorifics in Sinhala language are වහන්සේ-wahansē (venerable), හාමුදුරුවෝ-hāmuđuruwō (monk/venerable), තෙමේ-themē (sir), තොමෝ-thomō (madam), මයා-mayā (Mr.), මිය-miya (Mrs.), ඕ-ō, හු-hu and දෑ-đǣ, with all of them joining at the end of a noun. The suffixes ආණ-āņa, අණු-aņu, අණි-aņi used at the end of elders' names in the literary language also add honor to the salutations. As a rule, when using those 3 animate honorifics, the verb is always changed to its plural form.

පිය + ආණ + ඕ = පියාණෝ
piya + āņa + ō = piyāņō
father

පියා ගෙදර එයි
piyā geđara eyi
father comes home

පියාණෝ ගෙදර එති
piyāņō geđara ethi
father comes[come] home

පුත් + අණු + ඕ = පුතණුවෝ
puth + aņu + ō = puthaņuwō
son

පුතණුවෝ පාඩම් කරති
puthaņuwō pādam karathi
son studies[study]

හාමුදුරුවෝ බණ දෙසති
hāmuđuruwō baņa đesathi
venerable preach[es] a sermon

== Verb Honorifics ==
Any verb in Sinhala can be converted into an honorific by simply changing it into its plural form. Ex:ගියේය-giyēya(went) into ගියහ-giyaha(went[plural]) However, when referring to a royal or a venerable, verbs are changed either into their unique honorific forms or their plural "tatsama" forms.

හිමි + ඕ = හිමියෝ
himi + ō = himiyō
venerable monk

මම කෑම කෑවෙමි
mama kǣma [kǣwemi]
I [ate] supper.

හිමියෝ දන් වළඳති
himiyō đan [waļaňđathi]
the monk [eats] supper.

හිමිවරු දන් වැළැඳූහ
himiwaru đan [wæļæňđūha]
monks [ate] supper.

The words සේක-sēka and දෑය-đǣya are used at the end of the verbs in sentences beginning with the honorifics වහන්සේ-wahansē and දෑ-đǣ respectively.

== In Address and Request ==
The honorific නි-ni can be seen on formal salutations and in works of literature. Usually it is adjoined with the addressing honorifics තුමා-thumā or තුමී-thumī:

දෙවියනි
đewiyani
my god

ගුරුතුමනි
guruthumani
dear teacher

රජතුමනි
rajathumani
my king

නේ-nē is used when talking to give the same meaning:

බුදුනේ
buđunē
my lord buddha

දෙවියනේ
đewiyanē
my god

ජේසුනි
Jesuni
my Jesus

අම්මේ
ammē
dear mother

When requesting something to be done, මැනවි-mænawi is written at the end of a verb that is in order form. It is now only used in written works and historical plays.

දෙන්න මැනවි දෙනුමැනවි
đenna mænawi đenumænawi
give request {}
(I) ask that (you) give.

In the early colloquial Sinhala, the honorific suffix ņdi was used when addressing elder relatives and family members. After the colonial rule, these practices had been eventually abandoned.

අම්මා + ණ්ඩි = අම්මණ්ඩි
ammā + ņdi = ammaņdi
mother

අක්කා + ණ්ඩි = අක්කණ්ඩි
akkā + ņdi = akkaņdi
elder sister

අයියා + ණ්ඩි = අයියණ්ඩි
ayiyā + ņdi = ayiyaņdi
elder brother

== See also ==
- Indian honorifics, many South and Southeast Asian honorifics derive from Indian influence
- Thai honorifics
- Thai royal ranks and titles
- Malay styles and titles
- Filipino styles and honorifics
- Indonesian honorifics
- Greater India
- Indosphere
