= Luis Dery =

A Filipino historian from Sorsogon

- Luis Camara Dery in 1991
- Born: Luis Camara Dery; March 8, 1946; Gubat, Sorsogon, Philippines
- Died: July 31, 2023 (aged 77); Quezon City, Metro Manila, Philippines
- Education: University of the Philippines Diliman
- Occupations: Public historian, author, cultural administrator, educator
- Notable work: From Ibalon to Sorsogon: A Historical Survey of Sorsogon Province to 1905 (1991); A History of the Inarticulate (2001)
- Children: 1

Luis Camara Dery (March 8, 1946 – July 31, 2023) was a Filipino educator, historian and writer from Sorsogon. A graduate of UP Diliman, he is well known for his historiographical works about Bicol and pre-colonial Philippines as well as being the former president of the Philippine Historical Association.

== Early life and education ==
Born in Gubat, Sorsogon, on March 8, 1946 almost a year after World War II. He then nmoved to Rizal Province (now Metro Manila) and eventually finished college at the University of the Philippines Diliman in 1964. He pursued a master's degree which he completed in 1971 and a doctorate degree in history which he accomplished in 1987.

== Career ==
In the field of education, he taught in UP Baguio and in 1996, he taught in De La Salle University Manila. During his lifetime, he authored various essential works about Filipino history, most notably about Bicol as well as pre-colonial history involving the royal lineages of Luzon by examining the various wills including the Will of Fernando Malang Balagtas in his book A History of the Inarticulate. From 2013 to 2014, he served as the President of the Philippine Historical Association.

== Death ==
He died on July 31, 2023 at around 5:30 p.m. in his residence in Diliman, Quezon City, at the age of 77 from acute respiratory failure caused by pneumonia.

== Bibliography ==
Books and Publications

- The Socio-economic Profile of Out-of-School Youths in Northern Luzon (1978)
- From Ibalon to Sorsogon: A Historical Survey of Sorsogon Province to 1905 (1991)
- The Army of the First Philippine Republic and Other Historical Essays (1995)
- The Kris in Philippine History: A Study of the Impact of Moro Anti-Colonial Resistance, 1571-1896 (1997)
- Remember the Ladies and Other Documentary Essays on the 1896 Philippine Revolution (2000)
- A History of the Inarticulate: Local History, Prostitution and Other Views from the Bottom (2001)
- Alay kay Inang Bayan: Panibagong Pagtingin sa Kasaysayan ng Himagsikang Pilipino (2002)
- When the world loved the Filipinos and other essays on Philippine history (2005)
- Pestilence in the Philippines: A Social History of the Filipino People, 1571-1800 (2006)

== See also ==
- Ibalon
- Ambeth Ocampo
- Xiao Chua
- Zeus A. Salazar
- Reynaldo Ileto
- Teodoro Agoncillo
