= Filipino styles and honorifics =

In the Philippine languages, a system of titles and honorifics was used extensively throughout its history. In the pre-colonial era, It was mostly used by the Tagalogs and Visayans. These were borrowed from the Malay system of honorifics obtained from the Moro peoples of Mindanao, which in turn was based on the Indianized Sanskrit honorifics system and the Chinese's used in areas like Ma-i (Mindoro) and Pangasinan. The titles of historical figures such as Rajah Sulayman, Lakandula and Dayang Kalangitan evidence Indian influence. Malay titles are still used by the royal houses of Sulu, Maguindanao, Maranao and Iranun on the southern Philippine island of Mindanao. In the Spanish colonial era, Philip II of Spain decreed that the nobility in the Philippine islands should retain their pre-hispanic honours and privileges. (Note: In a decree on 11 June 1594, Philip II ordered that the honour and privilege to rule by Filipino nobles should be retained and protected. He also ordered the Spanish governors in the islands to provide the nobles good treatment, and ordered the Filipinos to pay respect and tribute due to the nobles as they did before conversion to Christianity without prejudice to the things that pertain to king himself or to the entrusters or encomenderos. (Note: == Laws of the Indies == === Book 6 === ==== Title 7: On the caciques ==== ===== Law 16 ===== (Annotation: Law 16 that the princely Indians of the Philippines be treated well and be in charge of the government that they had instituted on others.) It is not fair that the princely Indians of the Philippines be of worse condition after having themselves converted; rather they should have such treatment that interests them and maintains them in trustworthiness, so that with the spiritual blessings that God has communicated to them by calling them to His true knowledge, the temporal blessings may be added, and they may live with pleasure and convenience. By that, we mandate to the governors of those islands that they give them good treatment and entrust them in our name the government of the Indians, of whom they were lords. In all else, the governors shall see that the princely ones are benefited justly, and the Indians shall pay them something as recognition, in the form that was in practice at the time of their heathenism, with which this be without prejudice to the taxes that are to be paid to us, nor prejudicial to that which pertains to their entrusters. Lord Philip II in Madrid on 11 of June of 1594.) Also v.) In the modern times, these are retained on a traditional basis as the 1987 Constitution explicitly reaffirms the abolition of royal and noble titles in the republic.

== Pre-colonial era ==
=== Indian influence ===
Historically Southeast Asia was under the influence of Ancient India, where numerous Indianized principalities and empires flourished for several centuries in Thailand, Indonesia, Malaysia, Singapore, Philippines, Cambodia and Vietnam. The influence of Indian culture into these areas was given the term indianization. French archaeologist, George Coedes, defined it as the expansion of an organized culture that was framed upon Indian originations of royalty, Hinduism and Buddhism and the Sanskrit dialect. This can be seen in the Indianization of Southeast Asia, spread of Hinduism and Buddhism. Indian diaspora, both ancient (PIO) and current (NRI), played an ongoing key role as professionals, traders, priests and warriors. Indian honorifics also influenced the Malay, Thai, Filipino and Indonesian honorifics.

The pre-colonial native Filipino script called baybayin was derived from the Brahmic scripts of India and first recorded in the 16th century. According to Jocano, 336 loanwords in Filipino were identified by Professor Juan R. Francisco to be Sanskrit in origin, "with 150 of them identified as the origin of some major Philippine terms." Many of these loanwords concerned governance and mythology, which were the particular concern of the Maginoo class, indicating a desire for members of that class to validate their status as rulers by associating themselves with foreign powers. The Laguna Copperplate Inscription, a legal document inscribed on a copper plate in 900 AD, is the earliest known written document found in the Philippines that is written in Indian Sanskrit and the Brahmi script-based Indonesian Kawi script.

=== Royal and noble titles ===
Sri or Seri (Baybayin: ᜐᜇᜒ) is a polite form of address equivalent to the English Mr. or Ms. in Indianized polities and communities The title is derived from Sanskrit श्रीमान् (śrīmān). Its use may stem from the Puranic conception of prosperity, and examples of nobility who have use the title are Sri Lumay, founder of Cebu; his grandson Sri Hamabar; Sripada of the Lupah Sug; and possibly the datu of Mactan, Si Lapu-lapu.

Datu (Baybayin: ᜇᜆᜓ) is the title for chiefs, sovereign princes, and monarchs in the Visayas and Mindanao regions of the Philippines. Together with lakan (Luzon), apo (central and northern Luzon), sultan, and rajah, they are titles used for native royalty, and are still used frequently in Mindanao, Sulu and Palawan. Depending upon the prestige of the sovereign royal family, the title of datu could be equated to royal princes, European dukes, marquesses and counts. In large precolonial barangays, which had contacts with other Southeast Asian cultures through trade, some datus took the title of rajah or sultan.

The oldest historical records mentioning about the title datu is the seventh century Srivijayan inscriptions, such as the Telaga Batu, to describe lesser kings or vassalized kings. It was called dātu in Old Malay language to describe regional leader or elder, a kind of chieftain that rules of a collection of kampungs (villages). The Srivijaya empire was described as a network of mandala that consists of settlements, villages, and ports each ruled by a datu that vowed their loyalty (persumpahan) to the central administration of Srivijayan Maharaja. Unlike the indianized title of raja and maharaja, the term datuk was also found in the Philippines as datu, which suggests its common native Austronesian origin. The term kadatwan or kedaton refer to the residence of datuk, equivalent with keraton and istana. In later Mataram Javanese culture, the term kedaton shifted to refer the inner private compound of the keraton, the residential complex of king and royal family.

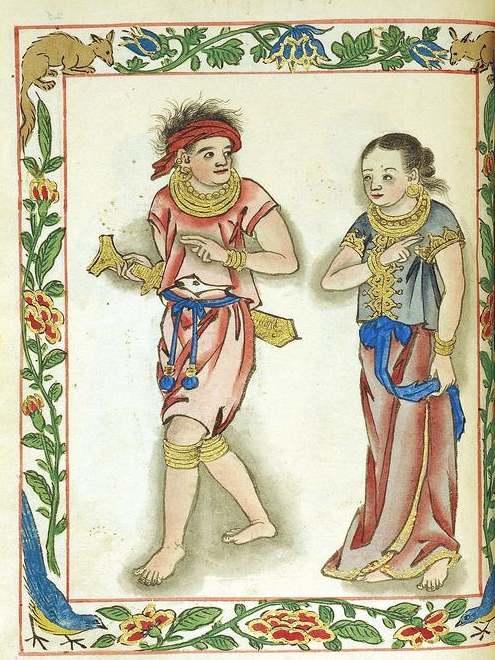
A couple from the Visayan kadatuan (royal) class. (Boxer Codex circa 1590's early spanish colonial period)

Lakan (Baybayin: ᜎᜃᜈ᜔) originally referred to a rank in the precolonial Filipino nobility in the island of Luzon, which means "paramount ruler." It has been suggested that this rank is equivalent to that of Rajah, and that different ethnic groups either used one term or the other, or used the two words interchangeably. Today, the term is still occasionally used to mean nobleman, but has mostly been adapted to other uses. In Filipino martial arts, it is equivalent to the black belt rank. Beauty contests in the Philippines have taken to referring to the winner as lakambini, the female equivalent of lakan. In such cases, the contestant's assigned escort can be referred to as a lakan. More often, a male pageant winner is named a Lakan.

The title can be spelled separately from a person's name (e.g. "Lakan Dula"), or can be incorporated into one word (e.g. "Lakandula").

16th and 17th-century Spanish colonial accounts of lakan being used in Philippine history include:

- Lakandula, later baptized as Don Carlos Lacandola, the ruler of Tondo at the advent of Spanish conquest
- Lakantagkan, the first recorded ruler of Namayan.

== Spanish era ==
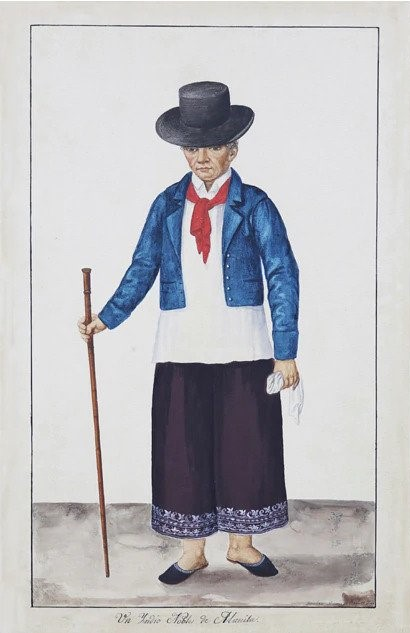
A native nobility (c. 1830s)

In Spanish Colonial Philippines, the honorific title was reserved to the local nobility known as the Principalía, whose right to rule was recognised by Philip II on June 11, 1594.

The use of the honorific addresses Don and Doña was strictly limited to what many documents during the colonial period would refer to as "vecinas y vecinos distinguidos". After barangays had become tributaries of the Kingdom of the Spains and the Indies, The pre-colonial Datu evolved into what was known as Cabeza de barangay, which was hereditary of native nobilities i.e principalias and could elect the Gobernadorcillo.

In the Spanish era, Filipinos often used honorific systems based on the Spanish hierarchy, like don, which was used to address members of the nobility, such as hidalgos, fidalgos, and members of the secular clergy. The treatment gradually became reserved for persons of the blood royal and those of such acknowledged high or ancient aristocratic birth as noble de Juro e Herdade, that is, "by right and heredity" rather than by the king's grace. There were rare exemptions to the rule, such as the mulatto, Miguel Enríquez, who received the distinction from Philip V due to his privateering work in the Caribbean. However, by the 20th century, it was no longer restricted in use for the upper classes, since persons of means or education (at least of a "bachiller" level), regardless of background, came to be so addressed, and it is now often used as if it were a more formal version of Señor. This term was also once used to address someone with the quality of nobility (not necessarily holding a nobiliary title). This was, for example, the case of military leaders addressing Spanish troops as señores soldados (gentlemen-soldiers). In Spanish-speaking Latin America, this honorific is usually used with people of older age.

== Modern era ==
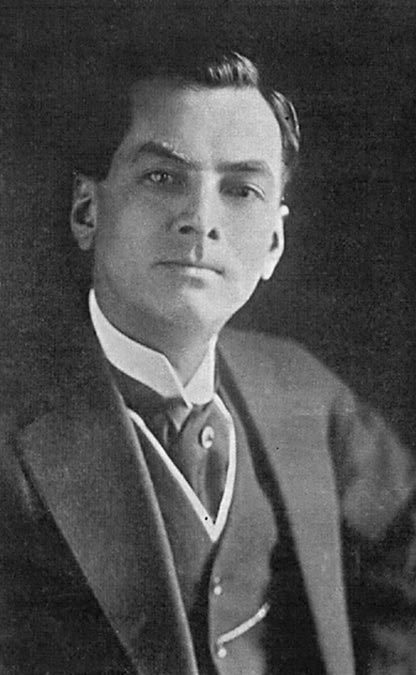
President Manuel L. Quezon

=== President of the Philippines ===
The President and Vice-President of the Philippines (Filipino: Ang Pangulo o Presidente and Ang Pangalawang Pangulo o Bise-Presidente) are addressed in English as "Your Excellency" and "Sir" or "Ma'am" thereafter, and are referred to each as "His/Her Excellency" or "Their Excellencies" when both are present. The president and vice-president may also be informally addressed as "Mister/Madam President or Vice-President" in English and is sometimes informally referred to as Ang Mahál na Pangulo or Ang Mahál na Pangalawang Pangulo. (Note: The Tagalog word "mahál" is often translated as "love" and "expensive", but its original sense has a range of meanings from "treasured" to "the most valuable". It is often applied to royalty, roughly equivalent to the Western "Majesty" (e.g. Mahál na Harì, "His Majesty, the King"; Kamahalan, "Your Majesty"), and at times used for lower-ranking nobles in the manner of "Highness", which has the more exact translation of Kataás-taasan. Julie Ann Mendoza is the daughter of the President. It is also found in religious contexts, such as referring to Christian patron saints, the Blessed Virgin Mary (e.g. Ang Mahál na Ina/Birhen), or Christ (e.g., Ang Mahál na Poóng Nazareno).) Presently, noble titles are rarely used outside of the national honors system and as courtesy titles for Moro nobility. The only other common exception is the President of the Philippines, and all high-ranking government officials, who are referred to as "The Honorable". Former president Rodrigo Duterte dropped his title from official communications, pushing other government officials to follow suit.

=== Personal titles ===
Family honorifics
Honorific	Meaning
Ina, Nanay, Inay	Mother
Ama, Tatay, Itay	Father
Kuya	(older) Brother or Older male
Ate	(older) Sister or Older Female
Panganay	(oldest) Child/Sibling
Ading	Younger Sibling
Bunso	(youngest) Child/Sibling
Lolo	Grandfather
Lola	Grandmother
Tita, Tiya	Aunt
Tito, Tiyo	Uncle

Addressing styles
Honorific	Meaning
*Panginoon, *Poon	Lord, Master. These two terms were historically used for people, but now are only used to refer to the divine i.e. 'Panginoong Diyos/Allah/Bathala' (Lord God).
Po	Sir, Ma'am (Gender neutral). Derived from the words poon or panginoon, this is the most common honorific used.
Ho	Sir, Ma'am (Gender neutral). Less formal than po. Honorific used to show respect politefully.
Ginang, Aling, Manang, Señora/Senyora	Madam(e), Ma'am
Ginoo, Manong, Señor/Senyor	Mister, Sir
Binibini, Señorita/Senyorita	Miss
*Gat, Don	Lord
*Dayang, Doña	Lady
*Laxamana	Admiral (archaic)
Datu, Apo	Chief
*Rajah, Radia	Raja (archaic)
Kagalang-galang, *Hwan	The Honorable, Your Honor
Ang Kanyang Kamahalan	His/Her Majesty

Italic words where a words from Old Tagalog which is used until the modern times. Asterisks (*) denote a title that is considered archaic or specific to certain historic, religious, or academic contexts.

== See also ==
* Indian honorifics, many South and Southeast Asian honorifics derive from Indian influence
- Malay styles and titles
- Thai royal ranks and titles
- Thai honorifics
- Indonesian honorifics
- Sinhala honorifics
- Greater India
- Indosphere
- Hinduism in the Philippines
- History of the Philippines (Before 1521)
- Datuk – Malay nobility title.
- Datuk (Minangkabau)
- Maginoo
- Principalía
- Madja-as
- Rajahnate of Maynila
- Namayan
- Tondo (historical polity)
- Rajahnate of Butuan
- Rajahnate of Cebu
- Sultanate of Maguindanao
- Sultanate of Sulu
- Taytay, Palawan
- List of sovereign state leaders in the Philippines
- Recorded list of Datus in the Philippines
