= Will of Fernando Malang Balagtas =

Alleged early Philippine document

The "Will of Fernando Malang Balagtas", sometimes also referred to as the "Will of Pansomun" is a disputed early Spanish-era Philippine document which was supposedly issued either on "25 March 1539" or "25 March 1589" by a "Don Fernando Malang Balagtas", whose original name (before his baptism as a Catholic) was "Pansomun." Despite its provenance having been questioned by Isabelo de los Reyes when he first published a copy of the will in the first volume of his seminal compilation "El Folklore Filipino", and more recently by Philippine scholars such as William Henry Scott, this "Will of Pansomun" is still popularly used as a reference for tracing the genealogies of the kings and lakans who ruled Manila and Tondo until the fall of these dominions to Spanish rule in the 1570s.

It is sometimes dated "25 March 1589" instead of "1539" but this does not reflect the date originally cited by de los Reyes.

== Disputed provenance ==
=== Genuineness questioned by Isabelo de los Reyes ===
The document referred to as the "Will of Pansomun" first became known through the work of Isabelo de los Reyes, in Volume 2 of his seminal work in Philippine folkloristics, "El Folklore Filipino." This second volume, published in 1890, included the work in a category titled "Folkloristic miscellany", and, along with the 1653 will of Andres Mangaya, who claimed to be Malang Balagtas' descendant and who had attached the original "Will of Pansomun" to his own will.

De los Reyes immediately questioned the provenance of these two "very curious unpublished documents about the Rulers of the Philippines and Moluccas at the time of the Conquest," noting that they had "certain facts which contradict those which are accepted as historic truths".

=== Exposition on inconsistencies by William Henry Scott ===
Commenting on the will in his 1982 book "Cracks in the Parchment Curtain," William Henry Scott notes that two "anachronistic" dates in the documents immediately bring its genuineness to question: the "25 March 1539" date of the document itself, and the "early part of 1524" reference in the text when Malang Balagtas and his family were supposedly baptized by a bishop in Cebu. Both of these dates are impossible, since, as Scott points out:

"the only Spaniards in the Philippines in 1524 or 1539 were captive survivors of Magellan's fleet, and none of them were either priests or bishops."

Scott notes that these dates could not simply be errors of Malang Balagtas when he executed the will, because the Certificate of Death, an official Spanish document, was attached to the document and bore the same dates. Scott notes that these historical inconsistencies: "... may be simple mistakes on the part of a senile illiterate on his deathbed, but similar details in an official death certificate appended to the will cannot be dismissed so lightly."

Furthermore, Scott notes that the death certificate was supposedly sworn by a church official who never existed historically:

"The death certificate purports to have been sworn, in the first-person singular, by Augustinian Procurator Fray Juan de Jesus in the Mission of San Carlos on March 21 of the year "mil quinientos treinta y nueve." Aside from the curious date and the even more curious circumstance of the testator's death having preceded the execution of the will by four days, both Isabelo (de los Reyes) and the others who examined the documents were aware that there had been no Augustinian Friar by the name of Juan de Jesus in the Philippines in the 16th century, nor had there been any mission or town of San Carlos at that time. As a topnotcher in graduate courses in paleography, and the theory and practice of editing public documents, Isabelo wisely refrained from attributing authenticity to either document."

Scott also mentioned another document, that of the apparent descendant of Balagtas' descendant, Andres Mangaya, when he executed his own will on "Oct 3 1563." However, the date that Scott mentioned was revealed to be an error on his behalf, as in de los Reyes' own original document, it was stated to be on "tres dias del mes de octubre de mil sescientos cincuenta y tres años", which translates to "3 October 1653".

=== 25 March 1539 v. 25 March 1589 and 1524 v.1521 ===
The occasional reference to the Will of Pansomun can be traced to the September 1919 issue of the Philippine Historical Quarterly, which published a copy of the will with the date "25 March 1589" instead of 1539. A large part of this text was recently requoted by historian Luis Camara Dery in his 2001 book "A History of the Inarticulate." Despite the somewhat more palatable 1589 date, this 1919 printing of the will still contains the anachronistic 1524 date of the baptism. Kapampangan historian Ian Christopher Alfonso suggested that the 1589 and the 1524 dates are a result of clerical errors, and that the original will of Fernando Malang Balagtas is no longer existing, as the earliest existing version or variation of the will dates back to May 20, 1698, from a man named Domingo Posadas.

== Historical documents with similar content ==
Although the provenance of the Will of Fernando Malang Balagtas is in question, there are a number of other historical documents containing similar information about the genealogies of the royal houses of Maynila and Tondo. These include the notarized Spanish era wills held by the Philippine National Archives, collectively known as the "Lakandula Documents" because they are mostly documents executed by direct descendants of Lakandula; and other miscellaneous genealogies, such as another genealogy printed in Volume 2 of El Folklore Filipino, which both de los Reyes and Scott considered more authoritative than the supposed Will of Pansomun.

== Content ==
Apart from the date as to when the will was supposedly written, as well as its authenticity and the details regarding the life of Balagtas, what has interested most historians regarding the contents of the will are the genealogies related to the ruling family of Luzon, including the ancestries of Lakandula, Rajah Matanda, Rajah Sulayman and other close and distant relatives. However the contents of the will have had different versions as the will has been passed down to many people over the years. Two of the most prominent versions are the Spanish version from Domingo Posadas as well as the English version by American missionary Luther Parker.

The will claims to document seven generations of the family of Fernando Malang Balagtas, whose name before his baptism into Catholicism had been "Pansomun." It places Malang Balagtas in the 5th generation of that family tree, which means that the will purportedly documents two generations of relatives younger than him, and four generations of relatives older than him.

The first two generations of the family tree include various names from the ruling families of the towns of Manila (the capital of Luzon; now Intramuros), Tondo and Namayan (now Santa Ana), while the third and fourth generations supposedly link Malang Balagtas to the ruling families of Manila and Tondo: "namely Lacandola and the two rulers, Matanda and Ladiamora" - first degree cousins once removed. "Ladiamora" which is the Malay title raja muda, meaning "crown prince" or "heir apparent", could refer to a successor to the royal line in the house of Matanda and Sulayman.

The last generations of the family tree supposedly identify the individuals who should be included in the property inheritances due to the descendants of these "great houses."

| Domingo Posadas Version (20 May 1698) | Luther Parker Version (1910) |
|---|---|
| El principal Arao y su muger Maylac Señores de estas Islas tuvieron por hijos al principal Gatpandan y Lontoc y dicho Gatpandan tuvo seis hijos que son los fundadores de Ternate, y dicho Lontoc se casó con la Señora de Pasig que es Calañgitan: | Principal Arao and his wife, Maylac, rulers in these islands, were the parents of principal Gatpandan and Lontoc; and the said Gatpandan had six children who are the founders of Ternate; and the said Lontoc married the Lady of Pasig who is Calangitan. |
| tuvieron cuatro hijos que son Pañginoan, Selalila, Lahat y Cahia dueños y Señores de estas Islas y dicho Pañginoan se casó con el Príncipe Balagtas, hijo de Soberano Emperador Soledan con la Emperatriz Sasanban del Reyno de Sapa, parte Romana; tuvieron tres hijos que son Malanci, mi padre, Dapat-Magmanoc y Macayabongdili y dicho Malanci se casó con Mandic, hija del Principal Lahat y tuvieron por hijos yo el otorgante testador, que anteriormente de infeles empleando el ser Lacandola, y me llamo Pansomun, y me dicho hermano si llama Pambagsic; me casé con Samac que se bautizó por D.a Juana Sisunan, Señora de Tabun, y tuvimos nuestros citados hijos; y mi dicho hermano tuvo dos hijos con D.a Magdalena Cadcad que son D.a Maria Labay y D. Lucas Tangui, y dicho Salalila tuvo tres hijos que son Lacandola menor y los dos rajas Matanda y Ladiamora y dicho Lahat tuvo nueve hijos con la Principal Timog que son Gat-Bonton, Monmon, Gat-Chalian, Gat-Maitan, á Macaralaga, Gat-Maitim, Mandic, Gat-Dula y Dumandan y dicho Cahia tuvo tres hijos, pero ignoro sus nombres; solo be conocidio por su nieto a mi sobrino Don Sebastian Cahia, y dichos hijos de Lahat con Timog se fundaron sus pueblos desde Dalayac, Duyong, Calantipay y Baliuag formo Gat-Bonton y caso con Macayabongdili, hermana de mi dicho Padre; | They had four children, namely, Panginoan, Selalila, Lahat, and Cahia, owners and Lords of these islands; and the said Panginoan married Prince Balagtas, a son of the Sovereign Emperor Soledan with Empress Sasanban of the Kingdom of Sapa, a part of Romana: they had three children, namely, Malanci, my father, Dapat- Magmanuc and Macayabong-dili; and the said Malanci married Mandic, a daughter of principal Lahat, and their children were I, the maker of this will, who formerly was employed as a ruler amongst the non-Christians, and my name is Pansomun, and my said brother is named Pambagsic; I was married to Samac who was baptized as Juana Sisunan, Lady of Tabun, and we had our said children; and my said brother had two children with Magdalena Cadcad, namely Maria Labay and Lucas Tangui; and the said Salalila had three children, namely Lacandola and the two rulers, Ladiamora; and the said Lahat had nine children with principal Timog, namely Gat-Bonton, Monmon, Gat-Chalian, Gat-Maitan, Macaralaga, Gat-Maitim, Mandic, Gat-Dula, and Dumanda; and the said Cahia had three children, but I do not know their names, having only known as his grandson my nephew, Sebastian Cahia; and the said children Lahat, with Timog, founded their towns from Dalayac, Duyong, Calantipay and Baliuag; Bonton married Macayabong-dile a sister of my said father. |
| tuveron cinco hijos que son Lovera, Macabat, Capitañgan, Taui y Pampalong que nombraron por Macapagal y dicha Monmon formo los de Quingua, Taal, Pinaniabatan, Tulican, Balocor, Cupang y se caso con Dapat Magmamanoc así mismo hermano de mi Padre: tuvieron cuatro hijos que son Tubling, Manotoc, Lampad y Magday y dicho Gatchalian formó Quingua grande, Matisan Bagaba, Pangatihan; pero ignoro sus hijos y dicho Gat-Maitan formó las de Malisquiapo, Guiguinto, Napulinan, Gatiagaan y Lugam y como también ignoro sus hijos y dicho Macaralaga formó las de Maloc, Pulilan, Munti, Dampol, Buguión, Mabugtos-na-ilog hasta Capitangan: assi mismo ignoro sus hijos, y dicho Gatmaitim formó desde la Bocana del rio Mabugtud na ilog, Ladha, Aldia, Balatong, Calumpit, Balungao, Pancabic, Gatboca, Lungos, Looc na malaqui hasta Bulusan y Parong-Parong y dicha Mandic mi madre formó las de Bebay, Bulusan, Caboo, Ibayong Pinagcoralan, Malindic, Mensulao, Pinga Pagaga, Linaguit, Mandasic, Pinagtapatan, Cupang, hasta Pandocot y se casó con el noble Infante Malansic, mi Padre y los hijos de Gat-Maitan también ignoro sus nombres, y dicho Gat-Dula formó las de Pandocot, Luasang Cupang, Pinaglibutan, Pinagtapatang-munti, Pangsuan, Quinaanuran, Caloogan hasta Niguing-matanda y Bangus y se casó con Sinuudan: tuvieron por hijos al Principal Mangintal y Tambas y dicho Dumandan formó las de Niguing-bago, Bangus na munti, Mataptap, Loasan, Bangus, Mahangos, Masupling, Malang, Hagunoy, Marilao, Наgonoy na matanda. Migong que és Paumbong con los ríos, Manglares y Nipales del dicho Hagunoy y se casó con Bayinda tuvieron por hijos los prin- cipales Gat-Baliti, Pinolasan y Gadbondoc, y los hijos de mi tio, hermano de mi citado padre: cada uno de ellos fundó sus pueblos en consorcio de mi dicho padre y tio Dapat Magmanoc, como Lovira mi prima carnal formó las de Candola y demás concernientes y se casó con Quiramdan y tuvieron dos hijos que son Paniquian y Saquit y dicho Paniquian tuvo dos hijos que son D. Andrés Calilo y D. Juan Galan y dicho Saquit tuvo un hijo que és D. Juan Lucas Pamintuan, y dicho D. Juan se casó con D.a Ana Sinacuman hija del principal de Tabungao; tuvieron tres hijos que son D. Lucas Balagtas, D.a Sebastiana Clara y D. Domingo Tungol y dicho Macabat formó las de Sampong, Banot y Bambang y demás concornientes y se casó en...(no se entiende); tuvo tres hijos pero ignoro sus nombres y dicho Capitangan formó las de Apalit y concernientes y se casó con Bainda: tuvieron seis hijos que son D.a Mónica Gumoo, D. Martin Palintan, D. Catalina Atlay, D. Francisco Marucod y Mairap y el sesto ignoro. Y dicho Taui, Pampalong que nombraron por Macapagal il formaron los de Masaquit, Tabuyoc, Balete, Cabangbangan, Cabuyad, Sulipan, Capalangan hasta el Estero de Gatboca juntos y cuadyuvados de mi dicho Padre, y mi tío dicho Taui tuvo dos hijos con Gat-Baliti que es Lamba: dicho Pampalong se casó con Mandic vieja de Pangaso, primos de primer grado: tuvieron tres hijos, también ignoro sus nombres, todos los cuales parientes citados son los que ascendieron en la noble linagia de los Señores de estas Islas, por lo cual declara y encarga clausula ser la verdad. | They had five children, namely Lovera, Macabat, Capitangan, Taui, and Pampalong whom they called Macapagal, and the said Monmon founded the towns of Quingua, Taal, Pananaiabatan, Tulican, Bacolor, Cupang, and married Dapat Magmanoc, who also was a brother of my father. They had four children, namely Tubling, Manotoc, Lampad and Magday, and the said Gatchalian founded large Quingua, Matisan, Bagaba, Pangatihan, but I do not know his children, and the said Gatmaitan founded the towns of Malisquiapo, Guiguinto, Napulinan, Gatiagan and Lugam, and I also do not know his children; and the said Macaralaga founded the towns of Maloc, Pulilan, Munti, Dampol, Baguion, Mabugtos-na-ilog as far as Capitangan, and I also do not know his children; and the said Gatmaitan founded from the mouth of the river known as Mabugtud-na-ilog, Ladha, Aldai, Balatong, Calumpit, Balungao, Paneabic, Gatboca, Lungos, Looc na malaqui as far as Bulusan and Parong-Parong; and the said Mandic, my mother, founded Bebay, Bulusan, Caboo, Ibayong, Pinagcoralan, Malandic, Mensulao, Pinga, Pagaga, Linaguit, Mandasic, Pinagtapatan, Cupang as far as Pandocot, and was married to the noble infante Malansic, my father; and the names of Gatmaitan's children are also unknown to me; and the said Gat-Dula founded Pandocot, Luasang, Cupang, Pinaglibutan, Pinagtapatang-munti, Pangsuan, Quinaanuran, Caloogan as far as Niguing-Matanda and Bangus, and married Sinundan. Their children were principal Mangintal and Tumbas; and the said Dumandan founded Niguinbago, maliit na Bangus, Nataptap, Loasan, Bangus, Manghus, Masupling, Malang, Hagunoy, Marilao, matandang Hagonoy, Magong, which is Paombong, also the rivers known as Manglares and Nipales in the said Hagonoy and married Bayinda, and their children were principales Gat-Baliti, Pinolasan and Gatbondoc; and the children of my uncle, a brother of my said father. Each one of them founded their towns in company with my said father and uncle, Dapat-Magmanoc, and Lovera, my female first cousin founded Candola and other places appertaining thereto, and married Quiramdam, and they had two children, namely, Paniquian and Saquit, and the said Paniquian had two children, namely, Andrea Calilo and Juan Galan, and the said Saquit had a son whose name is Juan Lucas Pamintuan; and the said Juan Married Ana Sinacuman, a daughter of the principal of Tabungao. They had three children, namely Lucas Balagtas, Sebastian Clara and Domingo Tungol; and the said Macabat founded Sampong, Banot and Bambang and other places appertaining thereto, and was married in... (not understood): he had three children but I do not know their names; and the said Capitangan founded Apalit and other places appertaining thereto, and married Bainda. They had six children, namely Monica Gumoo, Martin Palintan, Catalina Atlay, Francisco Marucod and Mairap, and I do not know the name of the sixth. And the said Taui and Pampalong, whom they called Macapagal, founded Masaquit, Tabuyoc, Balete, Cabang-bayan, Cabuyad, Sulipan, Capalangan, as far as the canal known as Gatboca, the two together and with the assistance of my said father, and my said uncle Taui, had two children with Gat-Baliti, who is Lamba. The said Pampalong married old Mandic of Pangaso, who was his first cousin. They had three children whose names I do not know, all of which above mentioned relatives were the ones who ascended to the noble lineage of the Lords in these islands, for which reason I expressly state it to be the truth. |
| 3.a Item que su abuelo Balagtas tiene dos hermanos que siguieron hasta Capangpangan que son Manduquit y Liqueo y casaron ambos, ésta como Manduquit tuvo por hijo á Magpuno quien tuvo por hijo á Lomboy padre de su difunta muger Samag que se bautizó por D.a Juana Sisunan, por lo cual manda á sus hijos y demás parientes que se conozcan por legitimos parientes todos los ascendientes del dicho Manduquit y Liquiao: assi encarga por ser su voluntad y verdad. | Moreover, that his grandfather, has two brothers who followed him as far as Capangpangan, their names being Manduquit and Liqueo. Both are married; the latter, the same as Manduquit, had a son, Magpono, who was the father of Lomboy, the latter being the father of his deceased wife, Samag, who was baptized as Juana Sisunan, and therefore he commands his children and other relatives to recognize as lawful relatives all the ancestors of the said Manduquit and Liquiao. Such is his request, it being his will and the truth. |
| 4.a Item declara que su citado abuelo Príncipe Balagtas con sus dichos hermanos, en cuanto se enviudaron, se volvieron otra vez à coronarse á sus Reynos como dichos Balagtas obtuvo la corona de Sapa, y Manduquit la de Bornay y Liquiao la de Mindanao, los cuales dejaron ambos sus insignias ó tuisones al Infante Malanci su padre para la perfección de su nobleza. | Moreover, he declares that his said grandfather, Prince Balagtas, as well as his said brothers, as soon as they became widowers, again returned to their kingdom to be crowned as such; Balagtas, secured the crown of Sapa, Manduquit that of Bornay, and Liquiao that of Mindanao and all of them surrender their insignia, or the Golden Fleece, to the Infante Malanci, his father, in order that their nobility be perfected. |

== See also ==
- Lakandula
- Rajah Matanda
- Rajah Sulayman
- Dayang Kalangitan
- Gat Lontok
- Empress Sasanban
- Namayan
