= Gat Lontok =

Husband of Dayang Kalangitan

Lontok
- Gat

Ruler of Pasig
- Predecessor: Principal Araw
- Successor: Rajah Salalila; Prince Balagtas
- Spouse: Dayang Kalangitan
- Issue: Dayang Panginoan; Dayang Lahat; Rajah Salalila; Gat Kahiya
- House: Pasig

Gat Lontok (Baybayin: ᜎᜓᜈ᜔ᜆᜓᜃ᜔), more commonly spelled as Lontoc, is a legendary figure in early Philippine history who was the ruler of Pasig along with his wife Dayang Kalangitan. According to the Will of Fernando Malang Balagtas (1589), he was described to be the son of Principal Araw and Maylak, who ruled Pasig beforehand.

He had four children with Kalangitan, who were Panginoan, Salalila, Lahat and Kahiya. Salalila later became the father of Lakandula, Rajah Matanda and Ladiamora, while Panginoan married Prince Balagtas.

== See also ==
- History of the Philippines
- Tondo (historical polity)
- Maynila (historical polity)
