= List of sovereign state leaders in the Philippines =

Maginoo, Wangs, Rajahs, Lakans, Datus and Sultans of the Philippines
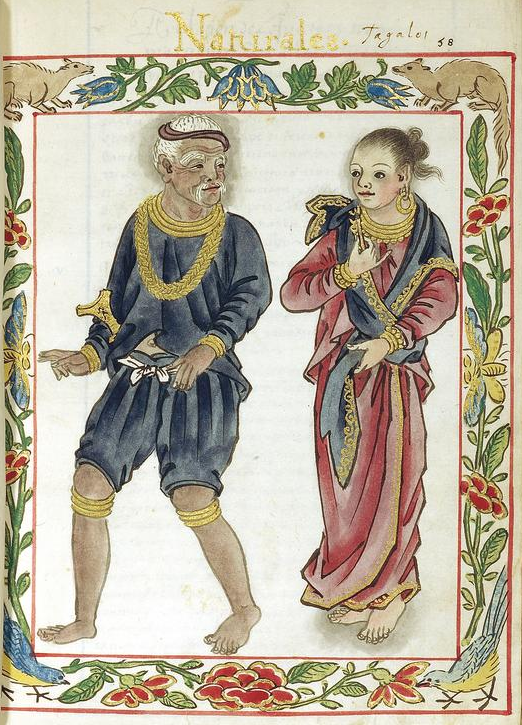
- A couple belonging in the maginoo (noble class)

Details
- Style: Maginoo; Kamahalan Kapunuan
- First monarch: Jayadewa (and other various rulers from the archipelago)
- Last monarch: Mohammed Mahakuttah Abdullah Kiram (and other various rulers from the archipelago)
- Formed: c. 900 (according to LCI)
- Residences: Torogan (Maranao, Langgal (Bangsamoro area) Bahay kubo

The types of sovereign state leaders in the Philippines have varied throughout the country's history, from heads of ancient chiefdoms, kingdoms and sultanates in the pre-colonial period, to the leaders of Spanish, American, and Japanese colonial governments as well as an unrecognized independent government, and the directly elected president of the modern sovereign state of the Philippines.

== Archaic (pre-hispanic) Era ==
Before the nation of the Philippines was formed, the area of what was now the Philippines during the pre-colonial times was sets of divided nations ruled by Kings, Chieftains, Datus, Lakans, Rajahs and Sultans in Southeast Asia. It was when the Spaniards arrived that they named the collections of areas they conquered and unite in Southeast Asia as "Las Islas Filipinas" or The Islands of the Philippines.

=== Legendary rulers ===
Legendary rulers can be found in the oral tradition in Philippine Mythology, which having an uncertain historical/archeological evidence of their reign.

Image	Name	Title held	From	Until
	Gat Pangil	Gat Pangil was a chieftain in the area now known as Laguna Province, He is mentioned in the origin legends of Bay, Laguna, Pangil, Laguna, Pakil, Laguna and Mauban, Quezon, all of which are thought to have once been under his domain.	Uncertain possibly Iron Age.	

== Archaic rulers ==
Pangasinan (historical polity)

Ruler	From	Until
Kamayin	1406	1408?
Taymey	1408	1409?

Historical rulers of Tondo

Image	Name	Title held	From	Until
	Unnamed	Senapati (Admiral) (Known only in the LCI as the ruler who give the pardon to Lord Namwaran and his wife Dayang Agkatan and their daughter named Bukah for their excessive debts in 900 AD.)	900?	?
	Lakandula	Bunao Lakandula, ruler of Tondo	After 1521	1571
	Agustin de Legazpi	The last ruler of Tondo. He was appointed to the position after the death of Lakandula. The monarchy was dissolved by the Spanish authorities after the discovery of the Tondo conspiracy.	1575	1589

,

=== Recorded rulers of Namayan ===
Title	Name	Notes	Documented Period of Rule	Primary Sources
Lakan	Tagkan	Named "Lacantagcan" by Huerta and described as the ruler to whom the "original residents" of Namayan trace their origin	exact years not documented; three generations prior to Calamayin	Huerta
(title not documented by Huerta)	Palaba	Noted by Huerta as the "Principal Son" of Lakan Tagkan.	exact years not documented; two generations prior to Calamayin	Huerta
(title not documented by Huerta)	Laboy	Noted by Franciscan genealogical records to be the son of Lakan Palaba, and the father of Lakan Kalamayin.	exact years not documented; one generation prior to Calamayin	Huerta
Rajah	Kalamayin	Named only "Calamayin" (without title) by Huerta, referred to by Scott (1984) as Rajah Kalamayin. Described by Scott (1984) as the paramount ruler of Namayan at the time of colonial contact.	immediately prior to and after Spanish colonial contact (ca. 1571–1575)	Huerta
(no title documented by Huerta)	Martin*	*Huerta does not mention if Kalamayin's son, baptized "Martin", held a government position during the early Spanish colonial period	early Spanish colonial period	Huerta

Legendary rulers of Namayan
Aside from the records of Huerta, a number of names of rulers are associated with Namayan by folk/oral traditions, as recounted in documents such as the will of Fernando Malang (1589) and documented by academics such as Grace Odal-Devora and writers such as Nick Joaquin.

Title	Name	Notes	Period of Rule	Primary Sources
Gat	Lontok	In Batangueño Folk Tradition as cited by Odal-Devora, husband of Kalangitan, serving as "rulers of Pasig" together.	Legendary antiquity	Batangueño folk tradition (cited by Odal-Devora, 2000)
Dayang or Sultana (Note: The term "Sultana" is used by Odal-Devora in her essay The River Dwellers (2000, page 47), saying "This Prince Bagtas, a grandson of Sultana Kalangitan, the Lady of Pasig, was also said to have ruled the Kingdom of Namayan or Sapa, in the present Sta Ana-Mandaluyong-San Juan- Makati Area. This would explain the Pasig-Sta Ana-Tondo-Bulacan-Pampanga-Batangas interconnections of the Tagalog ruling elites.")	Kalangitan	Legendary "Lady of the Pasig" in Batangueño Folk Tradition and "Ruler of Sapa" in Kapampangan Folk Tradition (as documented by Odal-Devora). Either the mother in law (Batangueño Tradition) or grandmother (Kapampangan Tradition) of the ruler known as "Prinsipe Balagtas"	Legendary antiquity	Batangueño and Kapampangan folk traditions (cited by Odal-Devora, 2000)
"Princess" or "Lady" (term used in oral tradition, as documented by Odal-Devora)	Sasaban	In oral Tradition recounted by Nick Joaquin and Leonardo Vivencio, a "lady of Namayan" who went to the Madjapahit court to marry Emperor Soledan, eventually giving birth to Balagtas, who then returned to Namayan/Pasig in 1300.	prior to 1300 (according to oral tradition cited by Joaquin and Vicencio)	Batangueño folk tradition (cited by Odal-Devora, 2000), and oral tradition cited by Joaquin and Vicencio)
Prince (term used in oral tradition, as documented by Odal-Devora)	Bagtas or Balagtas	In Batangueño Folk Tradition as cited by Odal-Devora, the King of Balayan and Taal who married Panginoan, daughter of Kalangitan and Lontok who were rulers of Pasig. In Kapampangan Folk Tradition as cited by Odal-Devora, the "grandson of Kalangitan" and a "Prince of Madjapahit" who married the "Princess Panginoan of Pampanga" Either the son in law (Batangueño Tradition) or grandson (Kapampangan Tradition) of Kalangitan In oral tradition recounted by Nick Joaquin and Leonardo Vivencio, the Son of Emperor Soledan of Madjapahit who married Sasaban of Sapa/Namayan. Married Princess Panginoan of Pasig at about the year 1300 in order to consolidate his family line and rule of Namayan	ca. 1300 A.D. according to oral tradition cited by Joaquin and Vicencio	Batangueño and Kapampangan folk traditions cited by Odal-Devora, and oral tradition cited by Joaquin and Vicencio)
"Princess" or "Lady" (term used in oral tradition, as documented by Odal-Devora)	Panginoan	In Batangueño Folk Tradition as cited by Odal-Devora, the daughter of Kalangitan and Lontok who were rulers of Pasig, who eventually married Balagtas, King of Balayan and Taal. In Kapampangan Folk Tradition as cited by Odal-Devora, who eventually married Bagtas, the "grandson of Kalangitan." In oral tradition recounted by Nick Joaquin and Leonardo Vivencio, "Princess Panginoan of Pasig" who was married by Balagtas, the Son of Emperor Soledan of Madjapahit in 1300 AD in an effort consolidate rule of Namayan	ca. 1300 A.D. according to oral tradition cited by Joaquin and Vicencio	Batangueño and Kapampangan folk traditions cited by Odal-Devora, and oral tradition cited by Joaquin and Vicencio)

=== The datus of Madja-as ===
Commander-In-Chief	Capital	From	Until
Datu Puti	Unknown	?	?
Datu Sumakwel	Malandog	?	?
Datu Bangkaya	Aklan	?	?
Datu Paiburong	Irong-Irong	?	?
Datu Lubay	Malandog	?	?
Datu Padohinog	Malandog	?	?
Datu Dumangsil	Katalan River, Taal	?	?
Datu Dumangsol	Malandog	?	?
Datu Balensuela	Katalan River, Taal	?	?
Datu Dumalogdog	Malandog	?	?

==== The Datus of Katugasan ====
The Reigning Datu	Events	From	Until
Kihod	last reigning monarch of the polity of Katugasan	?	1565

==== The Datus of Dapitan ====
The Reigning Datu	Events	From	Until
Sumanga	Datu Sumanga raids China to win the hand of Dayang-dayang (Princess) Bugbung Humasanum	?	?
Dailisan	The Kedatuan was destroyed by the Sultanate of Ternate	1563	?
Pagbuaya	The Kedatuan is re-established in Dapitan	?	1564
Manooc	The Kedatuan is incorporated to the Spanish Empire	?	?

==== Rulers of Maynila ====
Name	Events	From	Until
Salalila	Rajah Salalila or Rajah Sulayman I By this time, Manila was already under the influence of Brunei.	1500	Eartly 16th century
Matanda	Rajah Matanda or Rajah Ache	1521	1571
Sulayman	Rajah Sulayman III, Rajah of Manila	1571	1575

Legendary rulers of Maynila

Title	Name	Specifics	Dates	Primary source(/s)	Academic notes on primary source(/s)
Rajah	Avirjirkaya	According to Henson (1955), he was a "Majapahit Suzerain" who ruled Maynila before he was defeated in 1258 by a Bruneian naval commander named Rajah Ahmad, who then established Manila as a Muslim principality.	before 1258	Genealogy proposed by Mariano A. Henson in 1955	Cited in César Adib Majul's 1973 book "Muslims in the Philippines", published by the UP Asian Center and in turn referenced widely in semitechnical and popular texts. The veracity of "quasi-historical" (meaning not physically original) genealogical documents remains subject to scholarly peer review.
Rajah	Ahmad	According to Henson (1955), he established Manila as a Muslim principality in 1258 by defeating the Majapahit Suzerain Rajah Avirjirkaya.	c. 1258	Genealogy proposed by Mariano A. Henson in 1955	Cited in César Adib Majul's 1973 book "Muslims in the Philippines", published by the UP Asian Center and in turn referenced widely in semi-technical and popular texts. The veracity of "quasi-historical" (meaning not physically original) genealogical documents remains subject to scholarly peer review.

==== Monarchs of the Butuan Rajahnate ====
The Royal Title of the Reigning Rajah	Events	From	Until
Rajah Kiling	The embassy of I-shu-han (李竾罕)	fl.989	after 989
Sri Bata Shaja	Mission by Likanhsieh (李于燮)	fl.1011	after 1011
Rajah Siagu	Baptism by the Magellan Expedition	fl. 1521	after 1521

==== Rajahs of Cebu ====
The Royal Title of the Reigning Rajah	Events	From	Until
Sri Lumay	Founded the rajahnate, he is a minor prince of the Chola dynasty which occupied Sumatra. He was sent by the Maharajah to establish a base for expeditionary forces but he rebelled and established his own independent rajahnate.	?	?
Rajah Humabon	The Rajah of Cebu at the time Ferdinand Magellan arrived at Cebu and is the first Filipino chieftain to embrace Christianity.	fl. 1521	after 1521
Rajah Tupas	Last Rajah of Cebu, he ceded the Rajahnate to the Spanish Empire when he is defeated by Miguel López de Legazpi's forces in 1565.	?	1565

==== Sultans of Maguindanao ====
Sultans	From	Until
Shariff Kabungsuwan	1515	1543
Sultan Maka-alang Saripada	1543	1574
Sultan Bangkaya	1574	1578
Sultan Dimasangcay Adel	1578	1585
Sultan Gugu Sarikula	1585	1597
Sultan Laut Buisan	1597	1619
Sultan Muhammad Dipatuan Kudarat	1619	1671
Sultan Dundung Tidulay	1671	1678
Sultan Barahaman	1678	1699
Sultan Kahar ud-Din Kuda	1699	1702
Sultan Bayan ul-Anwar	1702	1736
Sultan Amir ud-Din (in Tamontaka)	1710	1736
Sultan Muhammad Tahir ud-Din (in Sibugay, Buayan, Malabang)	1736	1748
Sultan Rajah Muda Muhammad Khair ud-Din (paramount chief of Maguindanao by 1748)	1733	1755
Sultan Pahar ud-Din	1755	1780
Sultan Kibad Sahriyal	1780	1805
Sultan Kawasa Anwar ud-Din	1805	1830
Sultan Qudratullah Untung	1830	1854
Sultan Muhammad Makakua	1854	1884
Sultan Wata	1884	1888
No sultan Sultan Anwar ud-Din contested Datu Mamaku (son of Sultan Qudratullah Untung) of Buayan for the throne versus the then sultan Datu Mangigin of Sibugay.	1888	1896
Sultan Taha Colo	1896	1898
Sultan Mastura Kudarat	1908	1933

==== The Sultans of Sulu (1405–present) ====
Sultans	Image	From	Until
Sharif ul-Hāshim		1480	1505
Kamal ud-Din		1505	1527
Sultan Amir ul-Umara		1893	1899
Jamal ul-Kiram I		1825	1839, the progeny of the 1752 Kiram Sinsuat, Kiram Misuari and Kiram Sorronga.
Mahakuttah Kiram		1974	1986
Muedzul Lail Tan Kiram		1986	

== Philippines Era ==
The collection of islands conquered by the Spaniards was named Las islas Filipinas; a name given by Ruy López de Villalobos. It's the exact geographical location on which the modern day Republic of the Philippines based its territory.

== Rulers during the Spanish colonization ==
During the Spanish colonization, Remaining monarchs reign until their kingdoms was absorbed to the new colonial nation of the Philippines through Spanish conquest. Many of these territories are absorbed much later.

- Rajah Colambu – King of Limasawa in 1521, brother of Rajah Siagu of Butuan. He befriended Portuguese explorer Ferdinand Magellan and guided him to Cebu on April 7, 1521.
- Rajah Humabon – Rajah of Cebu who became an ally of Ferdinand Magellan and the Spaniards. Rival of Datu Lapu-Lapu. In 1521, he and his wife were baptized as Christians and given Christian names Carlos and Juana after the Spanish royalty, King Carlos and Queen Juana.
- Sultan Kudarat – Sultan of Maguindanao
- Lakandula – Lakan of Tondo
- Datu Lapu-Lapu – King of Mactan Island. He defeated the Spaniards on April 27, 1521.
- Datu Iberein – A datu of Samar at around 1543.
- Datu Sikatuna – King of Bohol in 1565. He made a blood compact with Spanish explorer, Miguel López de Legazpi.
- Datu Pagbuaya – King of Bohol. He governed with his brother Datu Dailisan, a settlement along the shorelines between Mansasa, Tagbilaran and Dauis, which was abandoned years before the Spanish colonization due to Portuguese and Ternatean attacks. He founded Dapitan in the northern shore of Mindanao.
- Datu Dailisan – King of Mansasa, Tagbilaran and Dauis and governed their kingdom along with his brother Datu Pagbuaya. His death during one of the Portuguese raids caused the abandonment of the settlement.
- Datu Manooc – Christian name – Pedro Manuel Manooc, son of Datu Pagbuaya who converted to Christianity, defeated the Higaonon tribe in Iligan, Mindanao. He established one of the first Christian settlements in the country.
- Rajah Siagu – Rajah of Butuan
- Apo Noan – Chieftain of Mandani (present day Mandaue) in 1521
- Rajah Sulayman – The heir apparent of the Kingdom of Luzon, was defeated by Martín de Goiti, a Spanish soldier commissioned by López de Legazpi to Manila.
- Rajah Tupas – Rajah of Cebu, conquered by Miguel López de Legazpi
- Datu Zula – A datu of Mactan, rival of Lapu-lapu
- Datu Kalun – Ruler of the Island of the Basilan and the Yakans in Mindanao, converted his line to Christianity
- Datu Sanday – Ruler of Marawi City
- unnamed Datu – King of Taytay Palawan. Mentioned by Pigafetta, chronicler of Magellan. The king, together with his wife were kidnapped by the remnant troops from Magellan's fleet after fleeing Cebu to secure provisions for their crossing to the Moluccas.
- Datu Cabaylo (Cabailo) – The last king of the Kingdom of Taytay

== During Revolts against Spain (1660–1661) ==
Free Pampanga
Name	Image	From	Until	Notes
Francisco Maniago		1660	1661	a Filipino revolutionary leader who conspired to overthrow Spanish rule in the northern Philippines and establish an independent Kapampangan nation in Pampanga, with him as "King of Pampanga."

Free Pangasinan
Name	Image	From	Until	Notes
Andres Malong		1660	1661	a Filipino revolutionary leader who conspired to overthrow Spanish rule in the northern Philippines and establish an independent Pangasinense nation in Pangasinan, with him as "King of Pangasinan."

Free Ilocos
Name	Image	From	Until	Notes
Pedro Almazán		1661	1661	a Filipino revolutionary leader who conspired to overthrow Spanish rule in the northern Philippines and establish an independent Ilocano nation in Ilocos, with him as "King of Ilocos."

== British Occupation of Manila (1762–1764) ==
Great Britain occupied Manila and the naval port of Cavite as part of the Seven Years' War.

Monarch	Image	From	Until	House
George III		November 2, 1762	May 31, 1764	Hanover

== Independent Ilocos (1762–1763) ==
Free Ilocos
Name	Image	From	Until	Notes
Diego Silang		1762	1763	a Filipino revolutionary leader who conspired with British forces to overthrow Spanish rule in the northern Philippines and establish an independent Ilocano nation.

== Under New Spain (1764–1821) ==
Monarch	Image	From	Until	House
Charles III		August 10, 1759	December 14, 1788	Bourbon
Charles IV		December 14, 1788	March 19, 1808	Bourbon
Ferdinand VII		March 19, 1808	May 6, 1808	Bourbon
Joseph I		December 11, 1813	September 29, 1833	Bonaparte

== Emperor of the Philippine Islands ==
No.	Name	Portrait	Tenure start	Tenure end	Notes
-	Andrés Novales (1795–1823)		June 1, 1823	June 2, 1823	His discontentment with the treatment of creole soldiers led him to start a revolt in 1823 that inspired even the ranks of José Rizal. He successfully captured Intramuros and was proclaimed Emperor of the Philippines by his followers. However, he was defeated within the day by Spanish reinforcements from Pampanga.

== Spanish East Indies (1821–1898) ==
After the 1821 Mexican War of Independence, Mexico became independent and was no longer part of the Spanish Empire. The Viceroyalty of New Spain ceased to exist. The Philippines, as a result, was directly governed from Madrid, under the Crown.

Monarch	Image	From	Until	House
Joseph I		December 11, 1813	September 29, 1833	Bonaparte
Ferdinand VII		December 11, 1813	September 29, 1833	Bourbon
Isabella II		September 29, 1833	September 30, 1868	Bourbon
Amadeo I		December 4, 1870	February 11, 1873	Savoy
President	Image	From	Until	Party
Estanislao Figueras		February 12, 1873	June 11, 1873	Federal Democratic Republican Party
Francesc Pi i Margall		June 11, 1873	July 18, 1873	Federal Democratic Republican Party
Nicolás Salmerón y Alonso		July 18, 1873	September 7, 1873	Federal Democratic Republican Party
Emilio Castelar y Ripoll		September 7, 1873	January 3, 1874	Federal Democratic Republican Party
Francisco Serrano, 1st Duke of la Torre		January 3, 1874	December 30, 1874	Conservative
Monarch	Image	From	Until	House
Alfonso XII		December 30, 1874	November 25, 1885	Bourbon
Alfonso XIII		May 17, 1886	December 10, 1898	Bourbon

== Revolutionary Republics and States ==
These are the people who led during the Philippine Revolution against the Spaniards and the subsequent Philippine–American War from 1896 onwards.

=== Sovereign Nation of the Tagalog People (1896–1897) ===
No.	Name	Portrait	Tenure start	Tenure end	Party
-	Andrés Bonifacio (1863–1897)		August 24, 1896	March 22, 1897 or May 10, 1897	Katipunan

=== Republic of Biak-na-Bato (1897) ===
No.	Name	Portrait	Tenure start	Tenure end	Party
-	Emilio Aguinaldo (1869–1964)		March 22, 1897	April 17, 1898	Katipunan (Magdalo)

=== Central Executive Committee and the Dictatorial Government of the Philippines (1898) ===
No.	Name	Portrait	Tenure start	Tenure end	Party
-	Francisco Makabulos (1871–1922)		April 17, 1898	May 19, 1898	None
-	Emilio Aguinaldo (1869–1964)		May 19, 1898	January 23, 1899	None

=== Negros Republic (1898–1901) ===
No.	Name	Portrait	Tenure start	Tenure end	Party
-	Aniceto Lacson (1857–1931)		November 5, 1898	July 22, 1899	
-	Demetrio Larena (1859–1916)		November 24, 1898	November 27, 1898	
-	José de Luzuriaga (1843–1921)		July 22, 1899	November 6, 1899	
-	Eusebio Luzuriaga (1869–1927)		November 6, 1899	November 6, 1899	
-	Simeón Lizares (1858–1935)		November 6, 1899	November 6, 1899	
-	Nicolás Gólez		November 6, 1899	November 6, 1899	
-	Agustín Amenábar		November 6, 1899	November 6, 1899	
-	Juan Araneta (1852–1924)		November 6, 1899	November 6, 1899	
-	Antonio Ledesma Jayme (1854–1937)		November 6, 1899	November 6, 1899	
-	Melecio Severino (1866–1915)		November 6, 1899	April 30, 1901	

=== Federal State of the Visayas (1898–1899) ===
No.	Name	Portrait	Tenure start	Tenure end	Party
-	Roque López		December 2, 1898	January 7, 1899	
-	Vicente Franco		January 7, 1899	January 7, 1899	
-	Raymundo Melliza (1854–1945)		January 7, 1899	July 16, 1899	
-	Nicolas Jalandoni (1852–1917)		July 16, 1899	July 16, 1899	
-	Jovito Yusay		July 16, 1899	September 23, 1899	
-	Ramón Avanceña (1872–1957)		September 23, 1899	September 23, 1899	

=== First Philippine Republic (1899–1902) ===
No.	Name	Portrait	Tenure start	Tenure end	Party
1	Emilio Aguinaldo (1869–1964)		January 23, 1899	April 19, 1901	None
-	Miguel Malvar (1865–1911)		April 19, 1901	April 16, 1902	None

=== Republic of Zamboanga (1899–1903) ===
No.	Name	Portrait	Tenure start	Tenure end	Party
-	Vicente Álvarez (1862–1942)		May 18, 1899	November 16, 1899	
-	Isidoro Midel (1869–19??)		November 16, 1899	March 22, 1901	
-	Mariano Arquiza		March 22, 1901	March 22, 1903	

=== Republic of the Tagalog Nation (1902–1906) ===
No.	Name	Portrait	Tenure start	Tenure end	Party
-	Macario Sakay (1870–1907)		May 6, 1902	July 14, 1906	Katipunan (holdout/revival)

== American Colonial Period ==
After the Spanish–American War ended with the Treaty of Paris, Spanish control over the Philippines (alongside Puerto Rico) was ceded to the United States for a sum of $20 million. The First Philippine Republic maintained unrecognized sovereignty until its suppression after the Philippine-American War. The islands remained a US territory until July 4, 1946.

=== Military Government of the Philippine Islands (1898–1902) ===
No.	Name	Portrait	Tenure start	Tenure end	Party
1	Wesley Merritt (1836–1910)		August 14, 1898	August 30, 1898	
2	Elwell Stephen Otis (1838–1909)		August 30, 1898	May 5, 1900	
3	Arthur MacArthur Jr. (1845–1912)		May 5, 1900	July 4, 1901	
4	Adna Chaffee (1842–1914)		July 4, 1901	July 4, 1902	

=== Insular Government of the Philippine Islands (1902–1935) ===
No.	Name	Portrait	Tenure start	Tenure end	Party
1	William Howard Taft (1857–1930)		July 4, 1901	February 1, 1904	
2	Luke Edward Wright (1846–1922)		February 1, 1904	November 3, 1905	
3	Henry Clay Ide (1844–1921)		November 3, 1905	September 19, 1906	
4	James Francis Smith (1859–1928)		September 20, 1906	November 11, 1909	
5	William Cameron Forbes (1870–1959)		November 11, 1909	September 1, 1913	
–	Newton W. Gilbert (1862–1939); Acting Governor-General		September 1, 1913	October 6, 1913	
6	Francis Burton Harrison (1873–1957)		October 6, 1913	March 5, 1921	
–	Charles Yeater (1861–1943); Acting Governor-General		March 5, 1921	October 14, 1921	
7	Leonard Wood (1860–1927)		October 14, 1921	August 7, 1927	
–	Eugene Allen Gilmore (1871–1953); Acting Governor-General		August 7, 1927	December 27, 1927	
8	Henry L. Stimson (1867–1950)		December 27, 1927	February 23, 1929	
–	Eugene Allen Gilmore (1871–1953); Acting Governor-General		February 23, 1929	July 8, 1929	
9	Dwight F. Davis (1879–1945)		July 8, 1929	January 9, 1932	
–	George C. Butte (1877–1940); Acting Governor-General		January 9, 1932	February 29, 1932	
10	Theodore Roosevelt Jr. (1886–1944)		February 29, 1932	July 15, 1933	
11	Frank Murphy (1890–1949)		July 15, 1933	November 14, 1935	

=== Commonwealth of the Philippines (1935–1946) ===
No.	High Commissioner	Image	From	Until	Party
1	Frank Murphy (1890–1949)		November 14, 1935	December 31, 1936	
–	J. Weldon Jones (1896–1982)		December 31, 1936	April 26, 1937	
–	J. Weldon Jones (1896–1982)		July 12, 1939	October 28, 1939	
2	Paul V. McNutt (1891–1955)		April 26, 1937	July 12, 1939	
2	Paul V. McNutt (1891–1955)		September 14, 1945	July 4, 1946	
3	Francis Bowes Sayre Sr. (1885–1972)		October 28, 1939	October 12, 1942	
4	Harold L. Ickes (1874–1952)		October 12, 1942	September 14, 1945	
No.	President	Image	From	Until	Party
1	Manuel L. Quezon (1878–1944)	Manuel L. Quezon	November 15, 1935	March 17, 1942	Nacionalista
1	Manuel L. Quezon (1878–1944)	Manuel L. Quezon	May 2, 1942	August 1, 1944	Nacionalista
-	José Abad Santos (1886–1942)		March 17, 1942	May 2, 1942	Independent
2	Sergio Osmeña (1878–1961)	Sergio Osmeña	August 1, 1944	May 28, 1946	Nacionalista
3	Manuel Roxas (1892–1948)	Manuel Roxas	May 28, 1946	April 15, 1948	Liberal

== World War II ==
=== Japanese occupation of the Philippines ===
No.	Name	Portrait	Tenure start	Tenure end	Party
1	Masaharu Homma (1887–1946)		January 3, 1942	June 8, 1942	
2	Shizuichi Tanaka (1887–1945)		June 8, 1942	May 28, 1943	
3	Shigenori Kuroda (1887–1952)		May 28, 1943	September 26, 1944	
4	Tomoyuki Yamashita (1885–1946)		September 26, 1944	September 2, 1945	

=== Philippine Executive Commission (1942–1943) ===
No.	Name	Portrait	Tenure start	Tenure end	Party
1	Jorge B. Vargas (1890–1980)		January 23, 1942	October 14, 1943	KALIBAPI

=== Second Philippine Republic (1943–1945) ===
No.	Name	Portrait	Tenure start	Tenure end	Party
1	Jose P. Laurel (1891–1959)	José P. Laurel	October 14, 1943	August 17, 1945	KALIBAPI

== Republic of the Philippines ==
=== Third Philippine Republic (1946–1973) ===
No.	Name	Portrait	Tenure start	Tenure end	Party
1	Manuel Roxas (1892–1948)	Manuel Roxas	May 28, 1946	April 15, 1948	Liberal
2	Elpidio Quirino (1890–1956)	Elpidio Quirino	April 17, 1948	December 30, 1953	Liberal
3	Ramon Magsaysay (1907–1957)	Ramon Magsaysay	December 30, 1953	March 17, 1957	Nacionalista
4	Carlos P. Garcia (1896–1971)	Carlos P. Garcia	March 18, 1957	December 30, 1961	Nacionalista
5	Diosdado Macapagal (1910–1997)	Diosdado Macapagal	December 30, 1961	December 30, 1965	Liberal
6	Ferdinand Marcos (1917–1989)	Ferdinand Marcos	December 30, 1965	January 17, 1973	Nacionalista

=== Martial law and the Fourth Philippine Republic (1973–1986) ===
No.	Name	Portrait	Tenure start	Tenure end	Party	Period
1	Ferdinand Marcos (1917–1989)	Ferdinand Marcos	January 17, 1973	June 30, 1981	Nacionalista, later KBL	Martial law
1	Ferdinand Marcos (1917–1989)	Ferdinand Marcos	June 30, 1981	February 25, 1986	KBL	Fourth Philippine Republic

Marcos officially lifted martial law on January 17, 1981. However, he retained much of the government's power until the inauguration of the Fourth Philippine Republic on June 30, 1981

=== Provisional Government (1986–1987) ===
No.	Name	Portrait	Tenure start	Tenure end	Party
1	Corazon Aquino (1933–2009)	Corazon Aquino	February 25, 1986	February 2, 1987	UNIDO

=== Fifth Philippine Republic (1987–Present) ===
No.	Name	Portrait	Tenure start	Tenure end	Party
1	Corazon Aquino (1933–2009)	Corazon Aquino	February 2, 1987	June 30, 1992	UNIDO, later independent
2	Fidel V. Ramos (1928–2022)	Fidel Ramos	June 30, 1992	June 30, 1998	Lakas
3	Joseph Estrada (born 1937)	Joseph Estrada	June 30, 1998	January 20, 2001	LAMMP
4	Gloria Macapagal Arroyo (born 1947)		January 20, 2001	June 30, 2010	Lakas, later Lakas–Kampi
5	Benigno S. Aquino III (1960–2021)	Benigno Aquino III	June 30, 2010	June 30, 2016	Liberal
6	Rodrigo Duterte (born 1945)	Rodrigo Duterte	June 30, 2016	June 30, 2022	PDP–Laban
7	Bongbong Marcos (born 1957)	Bongbong Marcos	June 30, 2022	Present	Partido Federal ng Pilipinas

== See also ==
- President of the Philippines
- Governor-General of the Philippines
- Filipino styles and honorifics
- Heads of state and government of the Philippines
- First ladies and gentlemen of the Philippines
- List of ancient Philippine consorts
- List of presidents of the Philippines
- List of unofficial presidents of the Philippines
- Vice President of the Philippines
- List of vice presidents of the Philippines
- Prime Minister of the Philippines (now defunct)
- Seal of the president of the Philippines
- List of current heads of state and government

== Works cited ==
- Agoncillo, Teodoro A.; Guerrero, Milagros C. (1970). History of the Filipino People (3rd ed.). Malaya Books.
- Chandler, David Porter; Steinberg, David Joel (1987). In Search of Southeast Asia: A Modern History (Revised ed.). University of Hawaii Press. ISBN 0-8248-1110-0.
- Philippine Electoral Almanac (PDF) (Revised and expanded ed.). Manila: Presidential Communications Development and Strategic Planning Office. 2015. ISBN 978-971-95551-6-2 – via Internet Archive.
- Tucker, Spencer, ed. (2009). The Encyclopedia of the Spanish–American and Philippine–American Wars: A Political, Social, and Military History. Vol. 1 (Illustrated ed.). ABC-CLIO. ISBN 978-1-85109-951-1.
