= Philippine Encomederos and Nobilities =

Contact era Spanish and Mexican Encomenderos and the Nobilities in the Philippines

This is an enumeration of known Philippine Nobilities and the Spanish and Mexican Born Encomenderos also granted by the Spanish Empire Nobiliary Status in the Philippine Context

The following is a reconstructed list of early encomenderos in the Philippines during the initial phase of Spanish colonization under Miguel López de Legazpi. The information is drawn primarily from early Spanish administrative reports (notably the 1576 report associated with Hernando Riquel) and later compilations such as the Blair and Robertson series. Most of these knights that were awarded with encomiendas were Mexicans or Spaniards born in Mexico, and they were rewarded by the crown with land and encomiendas for accompanying and co-investing with Miguel Lopez de Legazpi in the risk and reward of incorporating the Philippines into the Spanish Empire. These men who were soldiers and became Spanish knights that held land and labor in newly conquered Philippines made contact with homegrown native nobilities of the Animist Datus, Hindu Rajahs, and Islamic Sultans; that were already practicing rulers of their own small island principalities and polities.

Because of incomplete archival preservation, many entries include approximate or unspecified tribute figures.

== Philippine Encomenderos of Spanish and Mexican Origin ==
=== Cebu and adjacent settlements ===
- Miguel López de Legazpi – Cebu and dependent settlements

Held a royal encomienda centered on Cebu, the first Spanish base in the archipelago. Tributary figures are not precisely recorded.

- Jerónimo de Monzón – Cebu

Approximately 3,000 tributaries.

- Cristóbal Sánchez – Cebu

Approximately 2,000 tributaries.

- Francisco Carreño – Cebu

Approximately 1,000 tributaries.

- Andrés de Mirandaola – Cebu region

Held an encomienda in early Cebu settlements; tribute data not specified.

- Pedro de Arana – Cebu region

Early grant-holder; tributary figures not recorded.

- Alonso de Alvarado – Visayas

Received an encomienda in the central islands; details unclear.

=== Luzon and Mindoro ===
- Miguel López de Legazpi – Mindoro (port settlements)

Held a royal encomienda over coastal trade communities; tributary figures not recorded.

- Felipe de Salcedo – Mindoro (remaining areas)

Granted the remainder of Mindoro; several thousand tributaries estimated.

- Antonio de Carvajal – Luzon

Held an encomienda in early Luzon settlements; no exact figures preserved.

- Juan de Morón – Luzon

Early encomendero; tributary numbers not specified.

- Francisco de Herrera – Luzon

Received an encomienda; details incomplete.

- Pedro de Chaves – Luzon

Encomienda holder; tribute count unknown.

=== Manila, Cavite, and Laguna–Bombon region ===
- Miguel López de Legazpi – Cavite and adjacent coastal settlements

Held royal authority over Cavite and surrounding areas; no precise figures.

- Martín de Goiti – Bombon (Laguna de Bay region)

Approximately 8,000 tributaries; one of the largest early encomiendas.

- Esteban Rodríguez de Figueroa – Manila region

Held an encomienda near Manila; tribute figures not recorded.

- Juan Maldonado – Manila region

Early encomendero; limited data survives.

=== Northern Luzon ===
- Juan de Salcedo – Ilocos and Pangasinan

Received extensive regional encomiendas following expeditions; tributary counts not consistently recorded.

- Juan de la Isla – Northern Luzon

Received encomienda following expeditions; figures not preserved.

- Francisco de Saavedra – Northern Luzon

Early grant-holder; details fragmentary.

- Alonso de Contreras – Northern Luzon

Held encomienda; tribute counts not specified.

=== Panay and Western Visayas ===
- Gabriel de Ribera – Panay (riverine settlements)

Approximately 4,000 tributaries.

- Luis de la Haya – Panay (Araut River region)

Large inland encomienda; figures not precisely recorded.

- Pedro Sarmiento – Panay

Early encomendero; tribute data not specified.

- Francisco de Rivera – Panay

Held an encomienda in the region; details incomplete.

- Diego de Artieda – Visayas

Held administrative and encomienda authority; figures unclear.

== Local Philippine Nobilities ==
=== Datus ===
==== Ten rulers of Madja-as ====
Datus	Capital	Dayang (Consort)	Children
Datu Puti	Sinugbohan, San Joaquin	Pinangpangan	
Datu Sumakwel	Malandog, Hamtic	Kapinangan/Alayon	1.Omodam 2.Baslan 3.Owada 4.Tegunuko
Datu Bangkaya	Aklan	Katorong	Balinganga
Datu Paiburong	Irong-Irong (Iloilo)	Pabulangan	1.Ilohay Tanayon: 2. Ilehay Solangaon
Datu Lubay	Malandog, Hamtic	None	
Datu Padohinog	Malandog, Hamtic	Ribongsapay	
Datu Dumangsil	Katalan River, Taal	None	
Datu Dumangsol	Malandog, Hamtic	None	
Datu Balensuela	Katalan River, Taal	None	
Datu Dumalogdog	Malandog, Hamtic	None	

== Rajahs ==
=== Recorded monarchs of Butuan ===
Royal title of the reigning rajah	Events	From	Until
Kiling	Mission by Lijehan and Jiaminan (1003); Mission by I-shu-han (李竾罕) (1007)	1001	1009
Sri Bata Shaja	Mission by Likanhsieh (李于燮)	1011	?
Rajah Siagu	Blood Pact with Ferdinand Magellan	?	1521
Linampas	Son of Siagu	1521	1567
Silongan	Ruler of Butuan, converted to Christianity and baptized as Felipe Silongan	1567	1596

== Sultans ==
Historical records document 24 sultans of Maguindanao.

Reign	Name	Capital	Information and events		
1515-1543	Sharif Ali Kabungsuwan, styled Sultan Aliwya	Malabang	Johore prince who settled in Malabang around 1515. Descendant of Hassan ibn Ali, son of Fatimah, daughter of Muhammad. Married into various local royal families and founded the Maguindanao Sultanate.		
1543-?	Sharif Makaalang		Son of Sharif Kabungsuwan and Angintabu, of Malabang Iranun royalty. Also known in tarsilas and Spanish records alike as Saripada.		
?-1578	Datu Bangkaya		Son of Sharif Makaalang. Probably offered friendship with the Spaniards in 1574.		
1578-1585	Datu Dimasangkay		Son of Bangkaya who ruled at old age. Legendary ancestor of all Iranun and Maranao datus.		
1585-1597	Gugu Sarikula		Half brother of Dimasangkay who was probably exiled to Jolo for rebelling. Married into Sulu royalty.		
1597-1619	Kapitan Laut Buisan		Younger half-brother of both Dimasangkay and Salikula, also called Katchil.		
1619-1671	Sultan Kudarat	Lamitan (1619-1637) Simuay (1637-1671)	Son of Buisan. First to unite sa ilud and sa raya polities and opened Simuay as a free trading port, consolidating tribute over many Iranun, Maranao, Manobo, and Tirurays, as well as Sarangani and Davao by force. Also called Nasir-udin by grandchildren.		
	Sultan Dundang Tidulay	Simuay	Son of Kudarat who died earlier than him. Probably ruled for a very brief period of time. Called Saif ud-Din by grandchildren.		
	Sultan Barahaman	Simuay	Son of Tidulay. Also known as Muhammad Shah by his children, Minulu sa Rahmatullah, and Almo Sabat (Arabic, Al Mu-Thabbat).		
	Sultan Kahar Ud-din Kuda	Simuay	Younger brother of Barahaman Also known as Jamal ul-'Azam, Amir ul-‘Umara, and Maulana. A botched offer for alliance with Sultan Shahab ud-Din of Sulu became a pitched battle between both Sultanates, ending with his murder in 1702 personally by Shabab ud-Din himself.		
	Sultan Bayan Ul-Anwar	Slangan	Son of Barahaman. Also known as Jalal ud-Din and Dipatuan during his lifetime, and Mupat Batua after death. His younger brother, Ja'far Sadiq, attempted to revolt against him but kept the throne.		
	Sultan Muhammad Ja'far Sadiq Manamir	Tamontaka	Younger brother of Bayan Ul-Anwar. Also known as Amir ud-Din and Maulana during his lifetime and posthumously as Shahid Mupat.		
????-1748	Sultan Muhammad Tahir Ud-din	Tamontaka	A son of Sultan Bayan ul-Anwar, he was commonly known to the Spaniards as "Dipatuan Malinug". He was also known as Muhammad Shah Amir ud-Din. In a battle in 1733, he killed his uncle Ja’far Sadiq Manamir. In 1736, his father started sharing with him the responsibilities of government. His authority was however contested by two of his cousins, sons of Manamir, forcing him to retire to the interior where he died in Buayan around 1748.		
1748-1755	Sultan Muhammad Khair ud-Din	Tamontaka	Son of Sultan Ja’far Sadiq. Also known as Pakir Maulana Kamsa (Arabic: Faqir Maulana Hamzah) or Amir ud-Din Hamza. He also used the name ‘Azim ud-Din and assumed the title Amir al-Mu'minin ("Commander of the Faithful"). In 1733, after his father was slain, he began to consider himself heir to the throne and thereupon styled himself the Rajah Muda. The next year, he was formally invested with the duties of a sultan in the presence of the Spanish officials from Zamboanga. With some Spanish aid, he was able to consolidate his position in Tamontaka and contest the rule of his uncle Bayan ul-Anwar and later that of his cousin Malinug. But upon the latter's death around 1748, the struggle for the sultanate ceased. Pakir Maulana Kamsa emerged as paramount chief of Maguindanao. Around 1755, he started to relinquish some of his powers to his younger brother with the condition that his son, Kibad Sahriyal, would be the Rajah Muda.		
1755-1780(?)	Sultan Pahar Ud-din		Younger brother of Pakir Maulan Kamsa. Also known as Datu Pongloc or Panglu, and posthumously as Mupat Hidayat. He began to exercise the powers of sultan around 1755 and was in the sultan's seat in that same year during Captain Thomas Forrest's visit in Maguindanao.		
1780(?)-1805	Sultan Kibad Sahriyal		His more regal title was Muhammad ‘Azim ud-Din Amir ul-Umara. He was a son of Pakir Maulana Kamsa. Even before the death of his uncle the Sultan, he was already being addressed as “sultan”. He was friendly towards the Spaniards and at least twice entered into peaceful negotiations with them, namely, in 1780 and 1794. He probably governed from 1780 to 1805.		
1805-1830	Sultan Kawasa Anwar Ud-din		Son of Kibad Sahriyal and like his father was also entitled Amir ul-‘Umara. Also known as Iskandar Julkarnain. He entered into a peace treaty with the Spaniards in 1805. He possibly reigned from 1805 to 1830.		
1830-1854	Sultan Iskandar Qudrallah Muhammad Zamal Ul-Azam		Grandson of Kibad Sahriyal and a nephew of Sultan Kawasa. Also known as Iskandar Qudarat Pahar-ud-Din or more popularly as Sultan Untong. In 1837 and 1845, he entered into friendly treaties with the Spaniards. He died either in 1853 and 1854.		
1854-1883	Sultan Muhammad Makakwa		Grandson of Kawasa Anwar ud-Din. His rule can be estimated to have lasted from about 1854 to 1884. He died in Nuling (present-day municipality of Sultan Kudarat).		
1884-1888	Sultan Muhammad Jalal Ud-din Pablu	Banubu	Son of Makakwa. Also known as Sultan Wata. His capital was at Banubu, just opposite the town of Cotabato across the Pulangi. He died in 1888.		
1896-1926	Sultan Mangigin	Cotabato (1896-1900) Sibugay (1900-1926)	Grandson of the famous Datu Dakula of Sibugay, who was a grandson of Kibad Sahriyal (No. 16). He began his rule in 1896. From 1888 to 1896, the Sultanate experienced an interregnum, possibly because Datu Uto (Sultan Anwar ud-Din of Buayan) wanted his brother-in-law Datu Mamaku (a son of Sultan Qudratullah Untong) to become Sultan. The Spaniards, however, wanted the sultanate to go to one of the Sibugay datus. In December 1900, Sultan Mangigin transferred his residence from Cotabato to Sibugay. In 1906, he married Rajah Putri, the widow of Datu Uto and sister of Datu Mamaku. He eventually retired and died peacefully in Sibugay in 1926.		
1926-1938	Sultan Muhammad Hijaban Iskandar Mastura Kudarat		Acceded the throne upon Mangigin's death in 1926. By this time, the Sultanate assumed a more ceremonial, traditional character. It continued to be the central institution for traditional and religious affairs of the Maguindanao and Iranun peoples.		
	Sultan Tato Esmael		Assumed the role of Sultan when the eldest grandson of Sultan Mastura, Datu Baraguir refused to become Sultan. The latter was supposedly the most legitimate claimant as matter of right: His father, Datu Mamadra – who could have succeeded – predeceased Sultan Mastura, the incumbent.	1990-2000	Sultan Muhammad Gutierez Baraguir

=== Pretenders ===
As of May 2018, there are three major royal families in Maguindanao. Each having an enthroned sultan under the Sultanate of Maguindanao, Kingdom of Buayan, and Domain of Allah Valley.

=== Genealogy ===
Family tree of Maguindanao monarchs

Adnan
Ma'ad
Nizar
Mudar
Ilyas
Mudrikah
Khuzaymah
Kinana
Al-Nadr
Malik
Fihr
Ghalib
Lu'ayy
Ka'b
Murrah
Kilab
Qusayy
Abd Manaf
Hashim
Abd al-Muttalib
Abu Talib	Abdullah
Muhammad
Fatima
Husayn ibn Ali
Ali al-Sajjad
Muhammad al-Baqir
Ja'far al-Sadiq
Ali al-Uraydhi
Isa Al-Rumi
Ahmad al-Muhajir
Ubaydullah
Ali Al-Awwal
Muhammad Sahib Al-Sawmaah
Alawi Ath-Thani
Ali Khali Al Qasim
Sayyid Al Mirbat
Ali
Muhammad Faqih Al Muqaddam
Sayyid Alawi Al Ghayur
Ali Mawla Al-Darak
Muhammad Mawla Al-Dawilah
Abdul Rahman As-Saqqaf
Abu Bakr As-Sakhran
Abdullah Al Saqqaf (Al-Aydarus)
Abu Bakr Al Aydarus
Abdallah Al Aydarus
Shaykh Al Aydarus
Abdallah Al Aydarus
Ali Zayn al-Abidin	Daughter of a Sultan
^{1} Sharif; Muhammad; Kabungsuwan r. 1515-1543	Angintabu
^{2} Sharif; Maka-alang r. 1543-1574
^{3} Sharif; Bangkaya r. 1574-1578
^{4} Dimasangcay; Adel r. 1578-1585	^{5} Gugu; Sarikula r. 1585-1597	^{6} Kapitan; Laut Buisan r. 1597-1619
Putri Mampey	^{7} Muhammad; Dipatuan; Kudarat r. 1619-1671
^{8} Dundang; Tidulay r. 1671-1675
^{9} Barahaman r. 1675-1699	^{10} Kaharuddin; Kuda r. 1699-1702
^{11} Bayanul; Anwar r. 1702-1736	^{12} Muhammad; Ja’far Sadiq; Manamir r. 1710-1733
^{13} Muhammad; Tahiruddin r. 1736-1748	^{14} Muhammad; Khairuddin r. 1733-1755	^{15} Paharuddin r. 1755-after 1780
^{16} Kibad Sahriyal r. c. 1780-1805
^{17} Kawasa; Anwaruddin r. 1805-1830	Raja Muda; Alamansa (Mupat sa Dansalan)
Amirul	Raja Muda; Tuwa	Datu Dakula
^{19} Muhammad; Makakwa r. 1854-1884	Datu Idris	^{18} Kudaratullah; Untong r. 1830-1854	Pugat
^{20} Muhammad; Jalaluddin; Pablu r. 1884-1888	Watamama; Kalug	^{22} Mastura; Kudarat r. 1926-1938	^{21} Mangigin r. 1896-1926
^{23} Muhammad; Ismail; Kalug r. 1938-1991
^{24} Muhammad; Baraguir r. 1991-2000
^{25} Sayyid Amir; Baraguir r. 2000-2006
?
^{26} Sayyidona Zamzamin r. 2006-present

== Notes ==
- A “tributary” (tributo) generally represented a household unit rather than an individual.
- The number of encomiendas recorded in the 1576 report is often estimated at over 100.

== Bibliography ==
- Blair, Emma Helen; Robertson, James Alexander (1903–1909). The Philippine Islands, 1493–1898. Cleveland: Arthur H. Clark Company.
- Phelan, John Leddy (1959). The Hispanization of the Philippines. Madison: University of Wisconsin Press. ISBN 978-0299018146.
