= Mexican military activities in Asia =

Mexico has had long contact with the nations of Asia ever since the Manila-Acapulco galleons connected the Americas with Asia with its terminal point being at Acapulco, Mexico. Since then Mexicans have been involved in military campaigns and liberation efforts in its long years of involvement in Asian theatres of war.

== Philippine Encomenderos of Spanish and Mexican Origin ==
By the 1560s, the conquistador Miguel López de Legazpi organized a humongous Spanish expedition to colonize the Philippines. The expedition was prepared and launched from the port of Barra de Navidad on Mexico's west coast. When the armada reached the Philippines in 1565, founding the early towns of Cebu and Manila, the administration and defense of these new territories relied heavily on the encomienda system. Many of these encomenderos were awarded land grants and labor rights, and they were of Spanish and Mexican descent.

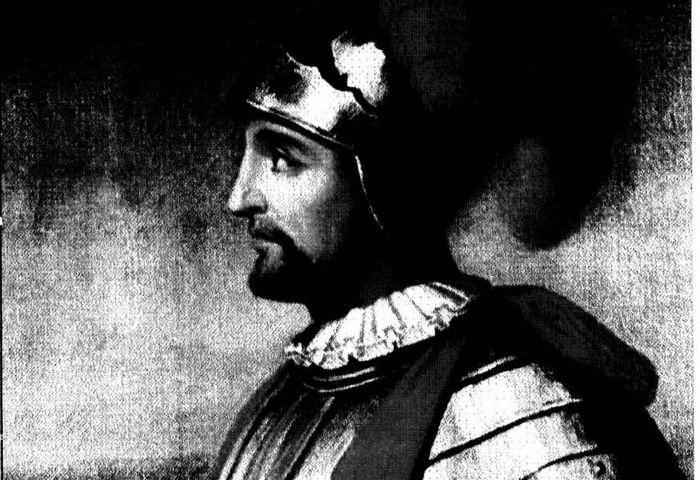
A sketch of the Conquistador Juan de Salcedo, a Conquistador born in the Mexican city of Tenochtitlan, he married Hindu Tondo's Princess Kandarapa. After going to war agains the Muslim ruler Rajah Sulayman.

These Mexican-born colonists and military men formed the backbone of Legazpi's forces as they subjugated local Kedatuans, Rajahnates, Sultanates, and Kingdoms, participating in the pacification of Cebu, Panay, and Manila, where they faced stiff resistance from local leaders like Rajah Sulayman. They used divide and conquer tactics as the united Spaniards and Mexicans; pitted the rivalling Hindu, Animist, and Muslim Filipino kingdoms against each other, with Spain also taking advantage of its previous war against Islam mainly against the Emirate of Granada, as a common experience shared with Filipinos.

== Tlaxcalans in the Philippines ==
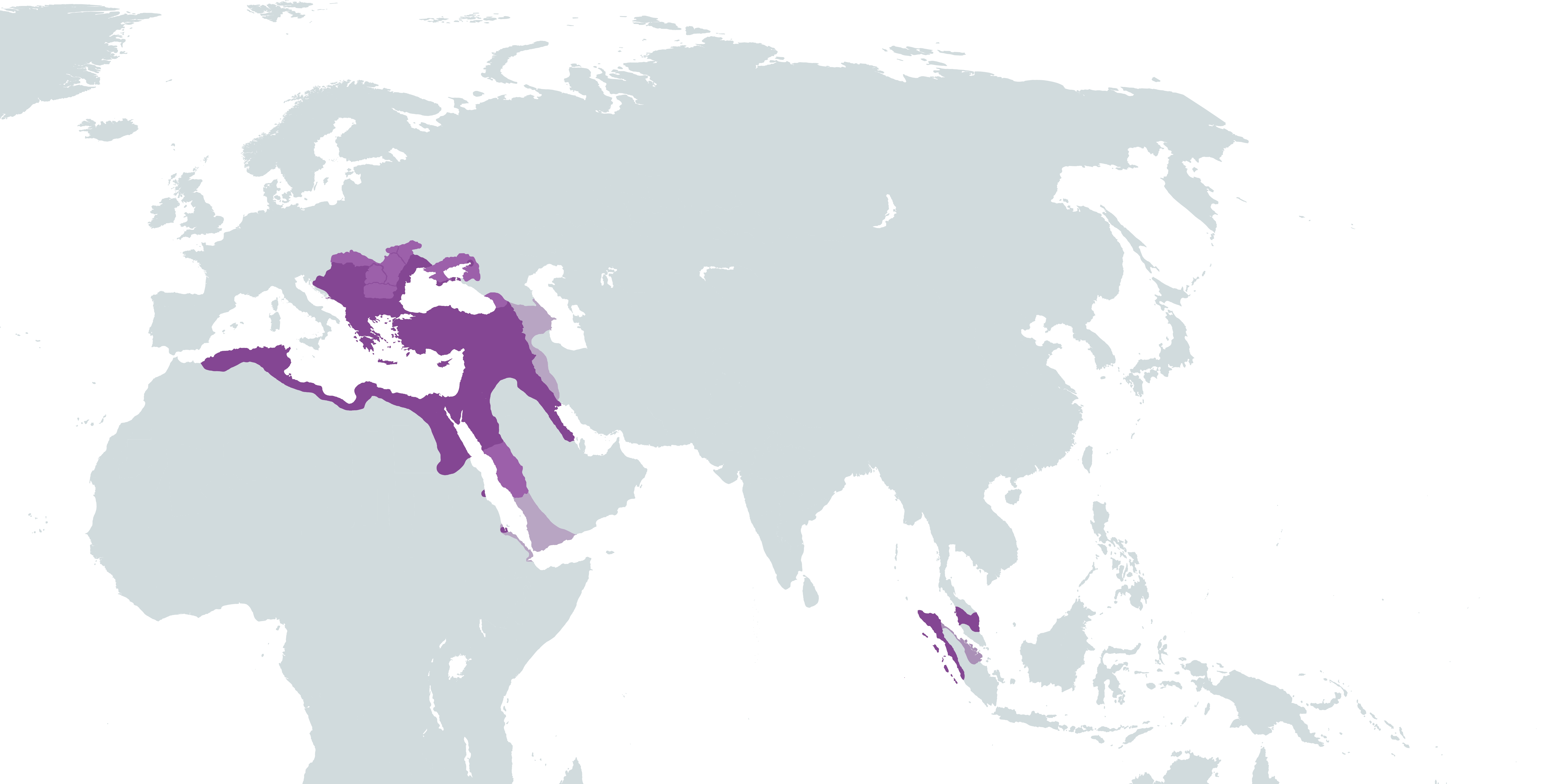
The Ottoman Caliphate and its overseas vassal state the Aceh Sultanate near the Philippines. The Ottoman Caliphate was the rival of the Spanish Empire as there was a crusade against them and the Ottomans assisted the nearby Muslims against Spanish rule while Spain sent help from the kingdoms of Latin America. including Mexico.

The ordinary makeup of the early Spanish expeditions were not exclusively European. Indigenous Mexican warriors, notably the Tlaxcalans, Mexica, and Zapotecs, also crossed the Pacific Ocean from Acapulco to serve as vital military units. These warriors were present in the founding of Cebu City and assisted in the founding of Manila and served as shock troops in several major engagements since then.

Their most famous deployment occurred during the 1582 Cagayan battles. A contingent of Tlaxcalan warriors and Spanish veterans under the command of Captain Juan Pablo de Carrión was sent to northern Luzon to expel a fleet of Japanese wokou pirates. The Mexican indigenous fighters engaged in fierce amphibious and land battles, ultimately securing a decisive victory against the Japanese raiders and cementing Spanish control over the Cagayan Valley.

== The Manila Galleons and Mexican Military Immigration ==
The Acapulco-Manila galleons functioned as the primary traffic route for the Spanish colonization of the Philippines from 1565 to 1815. Alongside silver and trade goods, these ships facilitated the annual immigration of military personnel to the archipelago of thousands of Mexican soldiers, some of whom were conscripted convicts, were transported across the Pacific every year to bolster the colonial garrison against internal rebellions and external threats, against Japanese Ronin and Chinese Pirates from the North, Muslim Jihadis from the south, Indochinese raiders from the West, as well as rival colonial powers like the Dutch, French, and Englsh. The galleon crews themselves were heavily composed of Mexicans who significantly influenced the local cultures of both the Philippines and Guam along the trade route.

== The Castilian-Bruneian War ==
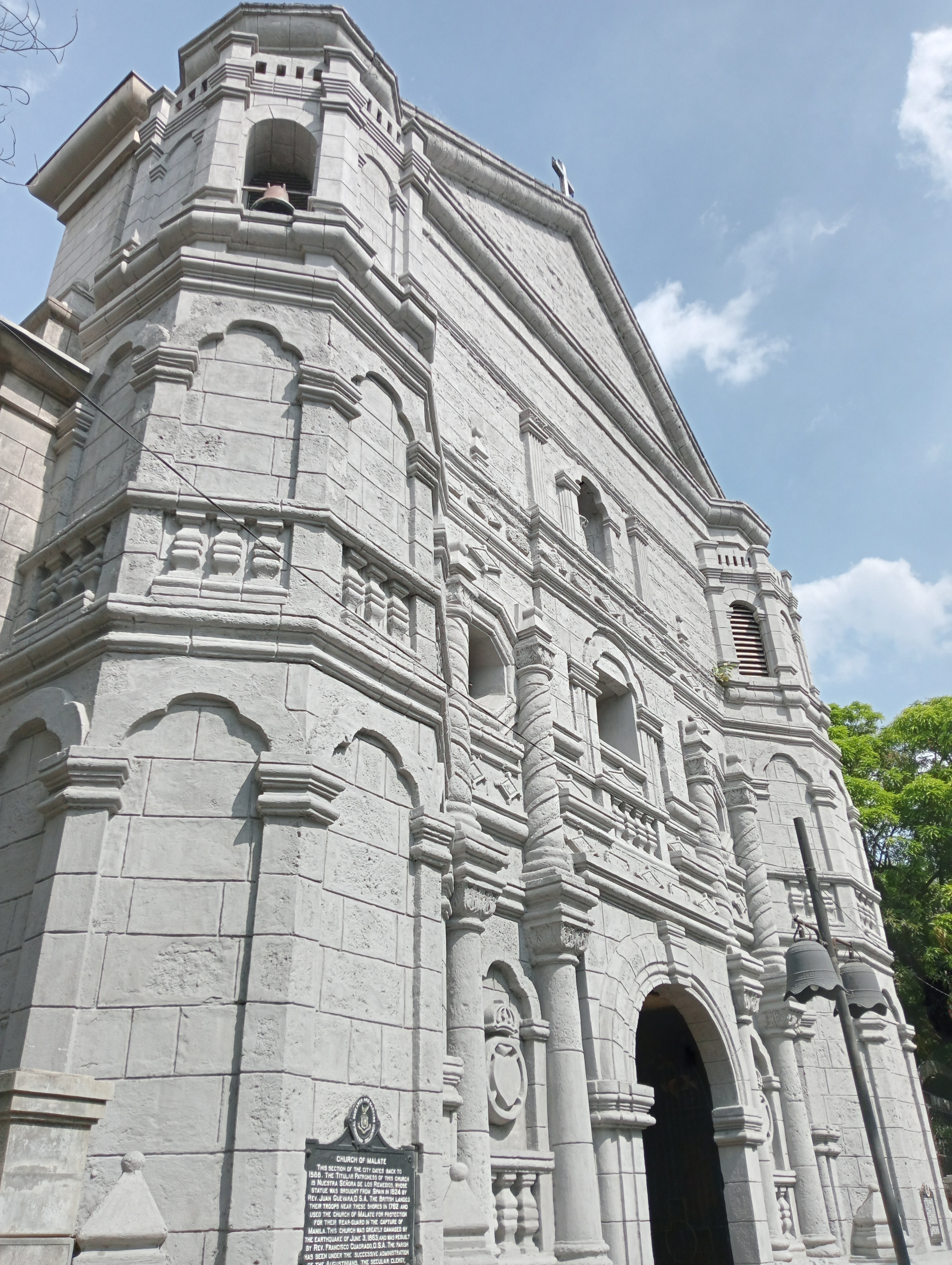
Malate Church at Manila, an example of Tequitqui art in the Philippines, it adopted Filipino Mudejar (Christianized Islamic Styles) and Mexican Baroque into its architecture as can be seen in its signature use of twisted columns common in Mexican Baroque. In the whole of Asia, only the Philippines has art and architecture taken from Latin America and Anglo America.

In 1578, the governor of the Philippines, Francisco de Sande, launched a major military campaign against the Islamic Sultanate of Brunei to curtail its influence in Southeast Asia. The invasion force included soldiers brought over from Mexico. These Mexican troops, occasionally referred to colloquially in modern times as "Aztecs" (though they did not use this term themselves), were instrumental in the Castilian War, helping Spain and the Philippines, temporarily capture the Bruneian capital.

== The Moro Wars ==
The influx of Mexican soldiers was also critical for sustaining the multi-century Moro Wars. The Spanish colonial government deployed these soldiers to the southern Philippines to wage continuous, scattered campaigns against the powerful Muslim sultanates of Mindanao and the Sulu Archipelago.

== The Revolt of Andrés Novales ==
By the early 19th century, racial and political tensions within the colonial military reached a boiling point. Creole officers (those of Spanish descent born in the Americas and the Philippines) grew deeply resentful as the crown began replacing them with peninsular (officers born in Spain) On June 1, 1823, Andrés Novales, a Creole captain in the Spanish Army, of the Philippines who was Mexican by descent, led a mutiny in Manila. He was supported by approximately 800 soldiers, largely consisting of discontented former Latin American officers—especially Mexicans, Peruvians, and Colombians—who had been demoted or exiled to the Philippines. The mutineers successfully captured key government buildings in Intramuros, and Novales was briefly declared the "Emperor of the Philippines" The rebellion was crushed within a day by loyalist Kapampangan troops, and Novales alongside his Mexican and Creole conspirators were executed, leaving a legacy that inspired later Philippine independence movements

== World War II: The Aztec Eagles ==
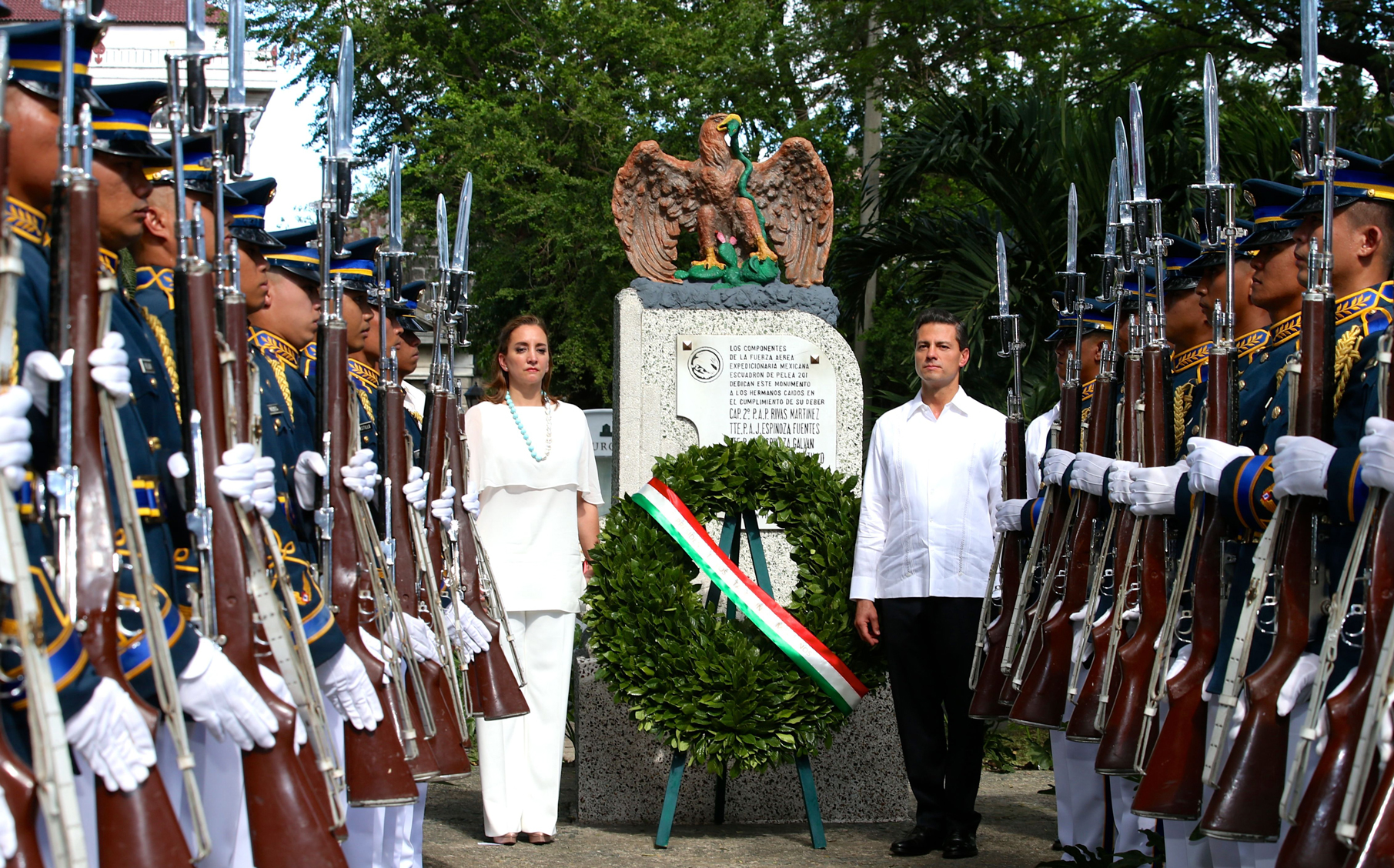
President Enrique Peña Nieto and Secretary of Foreign Affairs Claudia Ruiz Massieu visit the monument to the 201st Fighter Squadron, the "Aztec Aguilas" in Manila, November 2015.

Mexican military involvement in the Philippines concluded with a distinguished chapter during World War II. In 1945, Mexico dispatched the Escuadrón 201, nicknamed the "Aztec Eagles" (Águilas Aztecas), to assist Allied forces in the Pacific Theater.

Arriving in Manila on April 30, 1945, the 201st 201st Fighter Squadron was attached to the U.S. 5th Air Force and stationed in Pampanga. Flying P-47D Thunderbolts, also known as the Aztec Eagles, they flew numerous combat missions over Luzon and even as far as Formosa (Taiwan). They played a critical role in the liberation of the Philippines by providing close air support, destroying enemy emplacements, and neutralizing thousands of Japanese troops. The squadron suffered casualties during the campaign, and a monument was erected in Manila in 1945 to honor the Mexican pilots who fought and died for Philippine freedom.
