= Confederate States of Lanao =

Confederation in Mindanao, Philippines (1616–1935)

Confederate States of Lanao Pat a Pangampong sa Ranao
- 1616–1903 (Note: Became part of the Moro Province) or 1935 (Note: Confederated monarchy unrecognized by the Philippine Commonwealth)
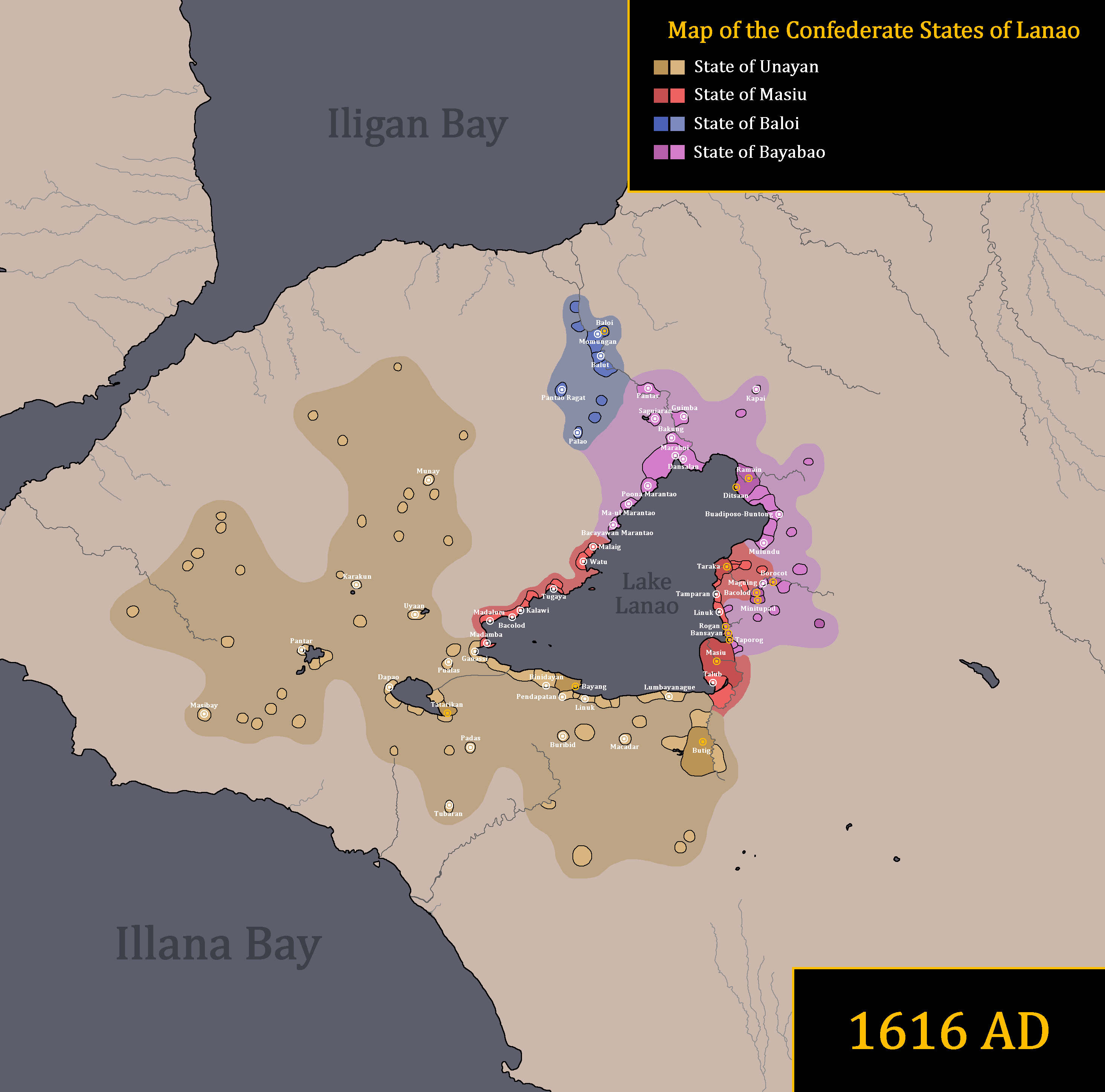
- The map of the Lanao Confederacy in 1616 after its separation from Maguindanao.
- Common languages: Maranao, Iranun, Maguindanaon, Subanen languages
- Religion: Sunni Islam
- Demonym: Maranao
- Government: Confederated monarchy (1616–1935)
- Sultan
  - 1640 – ?: Balindong Bzar of Masiu
- Legislature: Piyakambaya ko Taritib (Decider of Laws)
- History
  - Secession from the Sultanate of Maguindanao: 1616
  - As part of Moro Province: July 1, 1903
  - As part of Lanao (province): 1914
  - Confederated monarchy unrecognized by the Philippine Commonwealth: 1935
| Preceded by | Succeeded by |
| Sultanate of Maguindanao | Insular Government of the Philippines; Moro Province |
- Today part of: Philippines

The Confederate States of Lanao (Maranao: Pat a Pangampong sa Ranao, "Four States of Lanao") is a legislative confederation of the four Maranao states (pangampong) of Bayabao, Masiu, Unayan, and Balo-i centered around Lake Lanao in the center of the island of Mindanao, Philippines.

This confederation is also sometimes inaccurately referred to as simply the Lanao Sultanate or Sultanate of Lanao.

The Confederate States of Lanao, specifically its sultanates, still exists in modern-day Lanao del Sur and Lanao del Norte. However, all of the Lanao royal houses do not hold any political power in the Philippines.

== History ==
=== Pre-Islamic period ===
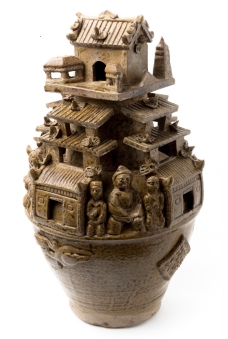
A Soul Vase (Hunping) from China from Old Yueh Era, Pre-Islamic and Pre-Hindu artifact found in the Caraga Putuan Crescent, that includes Lake Lanao in its jurisdiction. Caraga means soul in Butuanon-Mindanaoan and this soul vase encapsulated the Mindanao idea of souls' power.

Before the Maranaos were invaded by the Sultanate of Maguindanao, it already existed as a separate nation. The Chinese chronicle Zhufan Zhi (諸蕃志) published in 1225, described it as a country southeast of Shahuagong (Sanmalan) in present-day Zamboanga City, a country called "Maluonu", of which this is what the chronicles have to say.

Further southeast [of Shahuagong] there are uncultivated islands inhabited by barbarian bandits called Maluonu. When a merchant ship is blown off course to this country, these bandits assemble in large numbers and capture the crew, tie them between large bamboo sticks, cook them over a fire, and eat them. The chiefs of these bandits bore holes in their teeth and decorate the holes with gold. They use the tops of human skulls as eating and drinking vessels. The deeper one goes into these islands, the more cruel the bandits are.

— Zhufan zhi 諸蕃志 (1225)

==== Darangen ====
The Darangen is a traditional Maranao epic narrative in song existed before the 14th century during the pre-Islamic period in Mindanao. The epic has connections with early Sanskrit traditions, composed of 17 cycles and 72,000 lines. Aside from history, the epic explores themes of life, death, love, and politics, reflecting Maranao customs and values. The Darangen was mostly transmitted orally.

=== As part of the Maguindanao Sultanate ===
Eventually, the Lanao nation fell under the power of the Maguindanao Sultanate. The areas of Maguindanao and Lanao had embraced Islam, and Sultan Sharīf Kabunsuan, an Arab-Malay, introduced sultanate leadership to these regions. As he aged, Kabunsuan passed his title as sultan of Maguindanao to his son, Sharīf Makaalang, the first native Maranao sultan. The leadership continued through his descendants until Sultan Laut Buisan. After his death, Datu Kudarat sought to become the sultan, but leadership was to rotate to the Maranaos in Lanao based from tradition.

Due to his want of power, Kudarat invited his relatives from Lanao and announced his ambition of becoming sultan of Maguindanao. The Lanao lords were outraged. Balindong B'sar of Masiu, a Lanao lord, organised a meeting in Taraka then to Sawir, Lanao over which the Lanao datus decided to establish their own sultanate. The lords of Bayabao, Masiu, Unayan, and Balo-i seceded from the Maguindanao Sultanate in 1616. Datu Kudarat, meanwhile, became the sultan of Maguindanao.

The four states of Lanao consists of the following modern-day municipalities:

- Bayabao - Bubong, Ditsaan-Ramain, Marawi City, Kapai, Lumba-Bayabao, Poona Bayabao, Saguiaran, and Wao
- Masiu - Bacolod, Balindong, Madalum, Masiu, Mulondo, Tamparan, Taraka, and Tugaya
- Unayan
  - In modern-day Lanao del Sur: Bayang, Binidayan, Butig, Ganassi, Kapatagan, Lumbatan, Madamba, Malabang, Pualas, Tatarikan and Tubaran
  - In modern-day Lanao del Norte: Baroy, Lala, Munai, Karomatan, Nunungan, and Tubod
- Balo-i - Balo-i, Matungao, Pantao Ragat, and Tangcal

Despite being a separate state, the Confederate States of Lanao did not cut their military ties to the Sultanate of Maguindanao. The sultanates of Lanao worked with Maguindanao, combining their naval and military power. They also sent Maranao men to strengthen the Maguindanao fleet. In tandem with the rest of Mindanao, it absorbed a lot of from Arabic culture and language during the ascent of it's Islamization.

=== Conflict with Spain ===
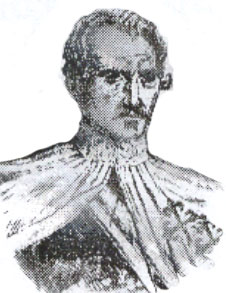
Spanish conquistador Sebastian Hurtado de Corcuera

Christianized Filipinos were used by the Spanish to invade the Maranao territory and other Muslim tribes in the Philippines. The Spanish colonial forces launched military and spiritual campaigns against the Maranao people at Lake Lanao. On April 4, 1639, Spanish conquistador Sebastián Hurtado de Corcuera sent the first expedition, which included Spaniards and Boholano troops. This campaign was led by Captain Francisco de Atienza and Fray Agustin de San Pedro, who formed alliances with some local chiefs. In 1640, Don Pedro Bermudes Castro established a garrison, but the Maranaos, feeling threatened, fought back, driving the Spaniards out and destroying their installations, leading to over 250 years without Spanish presence in the area.

Due to the arrival of the Spanish in Mindanao, Lanao was prevented to develop its own centralized system of authority. This decentralization led to independent functioning inged (towns) and agamas (communities) in Lanao over which modern scholars termed it as a "segmentary society".

=== Decline and fall ===
The American colonizers gained control of the Philippines from Spain in two ways: first, through the Treaty of Paris in 1898, which cost twenty million US dollars, and second, through armed conquest that defeated both the Filipino people and the Moro people in Mindanao. The treaty was a political agreement after the U.S. conquered Spain in the Spanish-American War. At the treaty's signing, certain Indigenous groups had not been colonized by Spain. One key issue is that the Moro people (particularly the Sultanate of Maguindanao, Sultanate of Sulu, and the Pat a P’ngampong sa Ranao, known as the Confederate States of Lanao) were brought into the Philippines without their consent.

==== Moro rebellion ====
The Maranaos fought the American colonizers. Notable battles include Bayang, Sultan Gumander, Ganassi and Tugaya. The Maranao fighters only used spear, bows and arrows while the Americans used rifles and cannons. Under Captain John J. Pershing, majority of the regions surrounding Lake Lanao fell under American control, with his last campaigns in Masiu and Taraca. By November 1903, he was succeeded by General Leonard Wood who sent punitive expeditions in Lanao to renounce the Maranaos' "uncivilized" practices such as slavery and theft. His expeditions resulted to the weakening of Moro resistance in Lanao leading to the Maranaos' crushing defeat. Eventually, in 1906, Lanao was pacified as noted by U.S. officials.

==== 1934 Dansalan Declaration ====
The Maranaos' opposition against American annexation continued on March 18, 1935, with the "Dansalan Declaration of 1934," prepared by Didato Amai Manabilang and one hundred twenty Datus of Lanao, including thirty sultans. They sent a letter to U.S. President Franklin D. Roosevelt and Congress, requesting that Mindanao and its Muslim inhabitants remain under American rule for future separate independence, but their request was rejected.

== Government ==
=== Administration ===
Unlike in Sulu and Maguindanao, Lanao's Sultanate system was decentralized. It consisted of Four Principalities, made up of various royal houses (Sopolo ago Nem a Panoroganan or The Sixteen Royal Houses) with defined territorial areas in Mindanao. This structure highlighted the shared power of ruling clans and values like unity (kaiisaisa o bangsa), patronage (kasesalai), and fraternity (kapapagaria).

Overall, the Lanao Sultanate consisted of traditional leaders and forty-three sultans. Fifteen of these sultans headed the fifteen royal houses of Lanao.

Before becoming a sultan, a Lanao Sultanate will undergo a thorough screening of lineage, family background, personal qualities, values, and morals before electing royalty. This process was based on an established protocol of the taritib and igma (customary laws). In addition to this, there are other general requirements and functions of the sultan. These include responsibilities such as that a sultan must lead his nation and help it prosper, solves societal problems, and ends shameful issues. The sultan also acts as Allāh’s representative on earth, guiding the people and should follow Allāh's commandments.

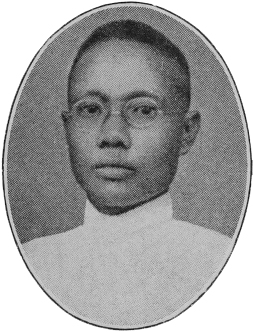
Datu Tampugaw, sultan of the Royal House of Pagayawan

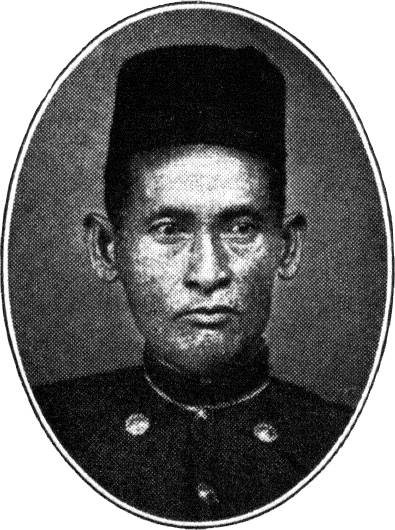
Datu Benito, Prince of Datu-a-Kabugatan of Masiu

==== Executive bodies (Pagawidan sultanates) ====
The confederate states was geopolitically divided into seven suku or districts along with its superordinate sultanates (Pagawidan):

| District (Suku) | Founding Ancestors | Superordinate Sultanates (Pagawidan) | Founding Ancestors | Notes |
|---|---|---|---|---|
| Poona-Bayabao | Embaor of Bansayan | Bansayan; Taporog; Rogan | Sultan Umparo; Sultan Amid-bunol; Sultan Aribo | |
| Lumba-Bayabao (now Lumba-Bayabao and Wao) | Sultan Apha; Sultan Engki-Okoda; Sultan Ibango; Sultan Digoa | Borocot; Minitupad; Maribo; Bacolod | Sultan Apha; Sultan Engki-Okoda; Sultan Ibango; Sultan Digoa | |
| Mala-Bayabao (now Ditsaan-Ramain, Marawi, Marantao, and Saguiaran) | Datu Ottawa of Ditsaan | Ramain; Ditsaan | Datu Acari of Ramain; Sultan Olok | |
| Butig | Sultan Barakat | Butig (East Unayan) | Sultan Barakat | |
| Domalon-dong (now Tatarikan/Pagayawan, Bayang, Tubaran, Pualas, and Binidayan) | Sultan Borrowa | Pagayawan; Bayang | Sultan Arobiro; Sultan Diwan | |
| East Masiu and West Masiu (now Bacolod, Taraka, Balindong, Madalum) | Sultan Balindong B’sar of Masiu | Sultanate of Masiu; Datu-a-Kabugatan | Sultan Racmatullah; Datu Dialaloden | |
| Balo-i (now Balo-i and Matungao) | Sultan Alanak | Balo-i | Sultan Alanak | |

The ruling clans governing each state traced their lineage back to Sharīf Kabunsuan. Sultan Okoda (Minitupad), Ibango (Maribo), Digoa (Bacolod), and Apha (Borocot) were descendants of Maniri of Lumba-Bayabao. Alanak, who established the State of Balo-i, was a descendant of Butuanun Kalinan of Bayabao.

==== Provincial governors and legislative bodies (Pagawid sultanates) ====
The provincial governors of the Confederate States of Lanao were 28 m’babaya ko taritib, who acted as policymakers. They governed 28 states and were known as pagawid sultans. Their appointment and qualifications were similar to those of the sultan and radia-muda (minister).

Here were the 28 pagawid sultanates:

- Talagian
- Bubong
- Bualan
- Lumbak-a-inged, Sisianun
- Galawan
- Botod
- Taluan
- Maguing
- Marawi
- Marantao
- Buadipuso-Buntong
- Antanga-Didagun
- Ragayan
- Timbab
- Malalis
- Dolangan
- Binidayan
- Pualas
- Padas
- Boribid
- Lumasa
- Malungun
- Pitakes
- Lima-inged/five county:
  - Wato
  - Tugaya
  - Kalawi
  - Bacolod
  - Madalum
  - Madamba
- Basagad
- Matampay
- Kabasagan
- Lumbak of Bae-sa-Lumbak

==== Lowest-ranking officials ====
The lowest group, lipongan, consisted of village units. The Taraka territory, capital of Masiu, was divided into lipongan groups, and those who built separate mosques gained autonomy.

==== Royal court officials ====
===== Bai-a-labis =====
One unique feature of the Confederate States of Lanao was that its royal court gave authorities to women. The bai-a-labis were symbolic leaders and actively serve their communities like the sultan. In Maranao society, women have special rights and lead community gatherings where they are the majority. The bai-a-labi also crowns lower-ranked bais, though a male representative from the royal houses must be present during these ceremonies. The position of bai-a-labi is typically held by the daughter, sister, or any woman relatives of the sultan.

===== Radia-muda (minister) =====
The minister or radia-muda advises the sultan as his main role. The sultan appoints deputies like a radia-muda or a datu-kali (head of judge) to help with judicial matters, which means the minister also assists in legal cases.

=== Legal system ===
The Agama Court of the Lanao Sultanate in the Philippines is different from Sharī‘ah Courts in other countries. It combines customary laws and Islamic law to settle cases. The sultan and the datu run the court, with the sultan often appointing assistants like radia-muda and or a datu-kali or kali (judge).

The process of the Agama Court is straightforward. Complaints can be filed orally or in writing. If the judge finds enough reason, the defendant is called to respond. The trial involves the plaintiff stating the case and presenting evidence. If the plaintiff has no evidence, the defendant can take an oath. Historically, the datu-kali or kali enforced judgments, and appeals could be made to higher authorities if decisions were questionable.

In terms of crimes and fornication, penalties included death penalty (Kitas), enslavement for women (Olol), stoning (Radiam), and fines (Kapangangawid). However, these practices were heavily discouraged by the American regime in the Philippines.

Maranao society is governed by two laws: Adat laws, which are customary, and kitab or Islamic laws. Adat laws consist of taritib, meaning "ordered ways," and igma, meaning "ordinance." Both terms refer to laws that guide social, political, and cultural aspects of the Maranao people.

== Contemporary period ==
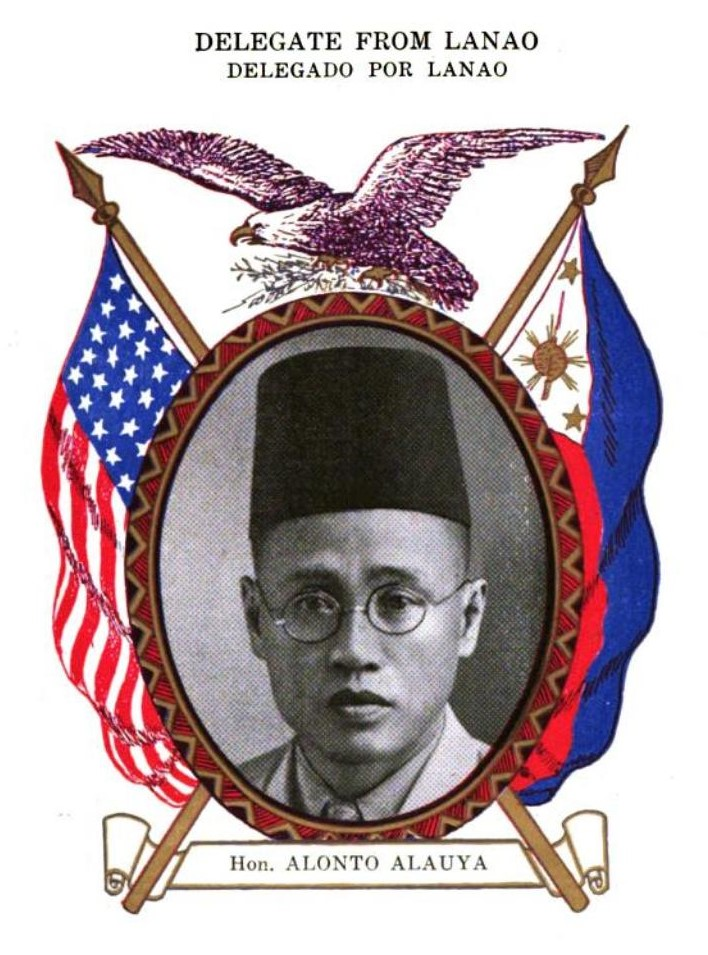
Alauya Alonto, sultan of Ramain after the confederate states fell under American control, he became a member of the House of Representatives during the Philippine Commonwealth

Although the sultanates as well as the royal houses still exists in Lanao, the 1935 Philippine Constitution prohibits granting title of nobility to a Filipino citizen. Hence, the sultanates of Lanao were unrecognized by the Philippine Commonwealth government and wield no political power. President of the Philippine Commonwealth, Manuel L. Quezon replaced the Bureau of Non-Christian Tribes with a cabinet-level Commission of Mindanao and Sulu (1936). One of its responsibilities was to remove all Muhammedan officials and local datus of "all official recognition".

At the time, Muslim leaders accepted the new Philippine regime. Alauya Alonto, Member of the House of Representatives and Sultan of the Royal House of Ramain, proclaimed himself as a Filipino. However, he noted discrimination between Christian and Muslim Filipinos stating in his speech in 1935: "We do not like to be called 'Moros' because when we are called 'Moros' we feel that we are not considered as part of the Filipino people." Alonto then went on to say that making Muslims in Mindanao politicians and citizens isn't enough to address the "Moro problem", but give them "a Muslim voice" in the Commonwealth regime. According to Sultan Sabdulah Ali Pacasum, sultan of the Royal House of Balo-i, in 2002 that "President Manuel Quezon’s policy of minimizing, even eliminating the influence and role of the traditional leaders, did not at all contribute to the national weal."

As of 2004, the sultanates of Lanao govern themselves within the Republic of the Philippines as the Sultanate League of Lanao.

On February 9, 2007, President Gloria Macapagal Arroyo issued Executive Order No. 602, which founded the Lanao Advisory Council to facilitate the Philippine national government's relations with 16 royal houses in the Lanao area.

== See also ==
- Sultanate of Maguindanao
- Sultanate of Sulu
- Sultanate of Buayan
