= Dimasangcay Adel =

- 4th Sultan of Maguindanao
- Reign: 1578–1585
- Predecessor: Datu Bangkaya
- Successor: Sultan Gugu Sarikula
Names
- Sultan Dimasangcay Adel, Datu Dimasangcay
- House: Sultanate of Maguindanao
- Father: Datu Bangkaya
- Religion: Sunni Islam

Sultan Dimasangcay Adel (alternative spelling Dimasangkay Adil, reigning 1578–1585) was the fourth sultan of Maguindanao in the Philippines. He was a direct descendant of Sharif Kabungsuwan, the first sultan of Maguindanao. He was the son of Sultan Bangkaya with his Iranun wife, according to the genealogical records (tarsila) of Maguindanao. Dimasangcay also had half brothers, Gugu Sarikula and Buisan, who also sequentially reigned as sultans of Maguindanao after him.

Dimasangcay was married to a woman from Lusud named Mira, and to another woman from Simway who bore him Umun and Butu-na-Samar; the latter was surnamed Jukulanu but died young and had no offspring. He also married Ampas, the sister of Sandab, and begot Umburung.

Other sources mention that Dimasangcay was married to Imbog, a Sulu woman, and they had a daughter named Paguian Goan. The daughter later married a Basilan chief of Bornean descent, Adasaolan.

Prominent descendants of Dimasangcay include the sultans of Ramitan, Tubuk, Dissan, and Tapurug in the Iranun region, who trace their lineage through his grandchildren Umang, Nagu, Anta, and Umbun.

== See also ==
- Sultanate of Maguindanao
- Gugu Sarikula
