= Datu Amir Baraguir =

Datu Amir bin Muhammad Andong Baraguir
- 25th Sultan of Maguindanao
- Reign: 2000 – 2006
- Coronation: December 12, 2005
- Predecessor: HRH Sayyid Hajji Datu Muhammad Gutierez bin Baraguir
- Born: January 16, 1960; Sultan Kudarat, Maguindanao, Philippines
- Died: January 11, 2006 (aged 45); Sultan Kudarat, Maguindanao del Norte, Philippines
- Burial: Upper Raguisi, Sultan Kudarat, Maguindanao del Norte, Philippines
- Wives: 1. Bai Moihra Sinsuat, daughter of Datu Mama Sinsuat - sometime Commissioner of the National Integration (Philippines) and Presidential Adviser on Muslim Affairs of then Philippine President Ferdinand Marcos; 2. Bai Zainab Andong al-Hajj, daughter of Datu Pendatun Andong - grandson of Rajah Ingkong, Rajah of Edtabidan or Taviran @ late 18th Century
Names
- HRH Seri Paduka Hajji Datu Amir bin Muhammad Andong Baraguir
- House: Kudarat
- Father: Sultan Sayyid Muhammad Bin Datu Baraguir, son of Watamama Datu Mamadra, who, in turn, is the son of Sultan Iskandar Hijaban Mastura, son of Sultan Qudratullah Jamalul Alam of Maguindanao
- Mother: Hajja Bai Fatima Carmen Andong, daughter of Datu Andong, who, in turn, is the son of Datu Unutan, son of Raja Ingkung of Taviran
- Religion: Islam

HRH Seri Paduka Sultan Sayyid Datu Amir bin Muhammad Baraguir al-Hajj was the 25th Sultan of Maguindanao, designated a successor by his father. He assumed the title upon his father's death on June 8, 2000, and proclaimed by the Royal Succession Council (Pat a pulaus) on May 5, 2005, and formally enthroned on December 12, 2005. He was shot dead in January 2006.
