= Heads of state and government of the Philippines =

Listed here are the heads of state and government of the Philippines, from the Spanish occupation up to the current Republic.

== Governor-General ==
Under the Spanish Colonial Government (1571–1764)
Status: Defunct
Inaugural holder: Miguel López de Legazpi

The Royal Governor-General of the Philippines ruled the Spanish colony that is today the Republic of the Philippines except a two-year British occupation of Manila. This territory was also called the Captaincy-General of the Philippines and thus the governor also held the title of Captain General, a military rank conferred by the Spanish Cortes Generales. The men that held this position governed the Philippines and the rest of the Spanish East Indies from 1565 to 1821, on behalf of the Viceroyalty of New Spain.

The Spanish Monarchy was the head of state of the Philippines at this time, as it was also the monarch of New Spain.

== Military Governor ==
Under the American Military Government (1898–1901)
Status: Defunct
Inaugural holder: Wesley Merritt

During the period when the Philippine Revolution and Spanish–American War were proceeding concurrently, the U.S. established a military government from August 14, 1898, in the parts of the country under control of U.S. forces On June 22, 1899, the Malolos Congress promulgated the Malolos Constitution, which established La República Filipina (in Spanish) or The Philippine Republic (in English). After the Spanish–American War was ended by the Treaty of Paris, in which Spain ceded the Philippine archipelago and other Spanish territories to the United States, the Philippine–American War ensued, ending in American victory on July 4, 1902.

== Civil Governor ==
Under the American Civil Government (1901–1935)
Status: Defunct
Inaugural holder: William Howard Taft (Would be US president)

From 1901 to 1935, the Philippines was governed by the United States of America. The Governor-General was appointed by the President of the United States and approved by the Senate. Unlike the Governors General of the British Dominions, the American Governors General exercised active executive authority over the nation they were appointed to administer, more like Governors of British colonies.

== Prime minister ==
Under the Aguinaldo and Marcos dictatorships
Status: Defunct
Inaugural holder: Apolinario Mabini

The Prime Minister of the Philippines (Spanish: Primer Ministro de Filipinas; Tagalog: Punong Ministro ng Pilipinas) was the official position of the head of the government (whereas the President of the Philippines was the head of state) of the Philippines. The position existed in the country from 1978 to 1986, as well as a limited version of such existed temporarily in 1899.

== President ==
Tagalog Republic, Malolos Republic, Commonwealth of the Philippines, Republic of the Philippines
Status: Active
Inaugural holder: Andrés Bonifacio (disputed)/Emilio Aguinaldo (official)

The President of the Philippines is the head of state and government of the Republic of the Philippines. The President of the Philippines in Filipino is referred to as Ang Pangulo or Pangulo ("Presidente," informally). The executive power is vested in the President of the Philippines.

Andrés Bonifacio was President (titled Supremo) of the Tagalog Republic's revolutionary government from 1896 to 1897. Emilio Aguinaldo was President of the insurgent Philippine Republic revolutionary government from 1899 to 1902. The Philippine government recognises Emilio Aguinaldo as "President of the First Republic".

The incumbent president is Bongbong Marcos.

== Gallery ==
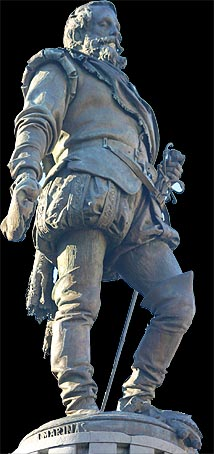
Governor General de Legazpi

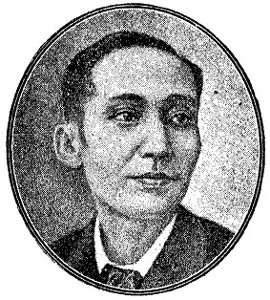
Prime Minister Mabini

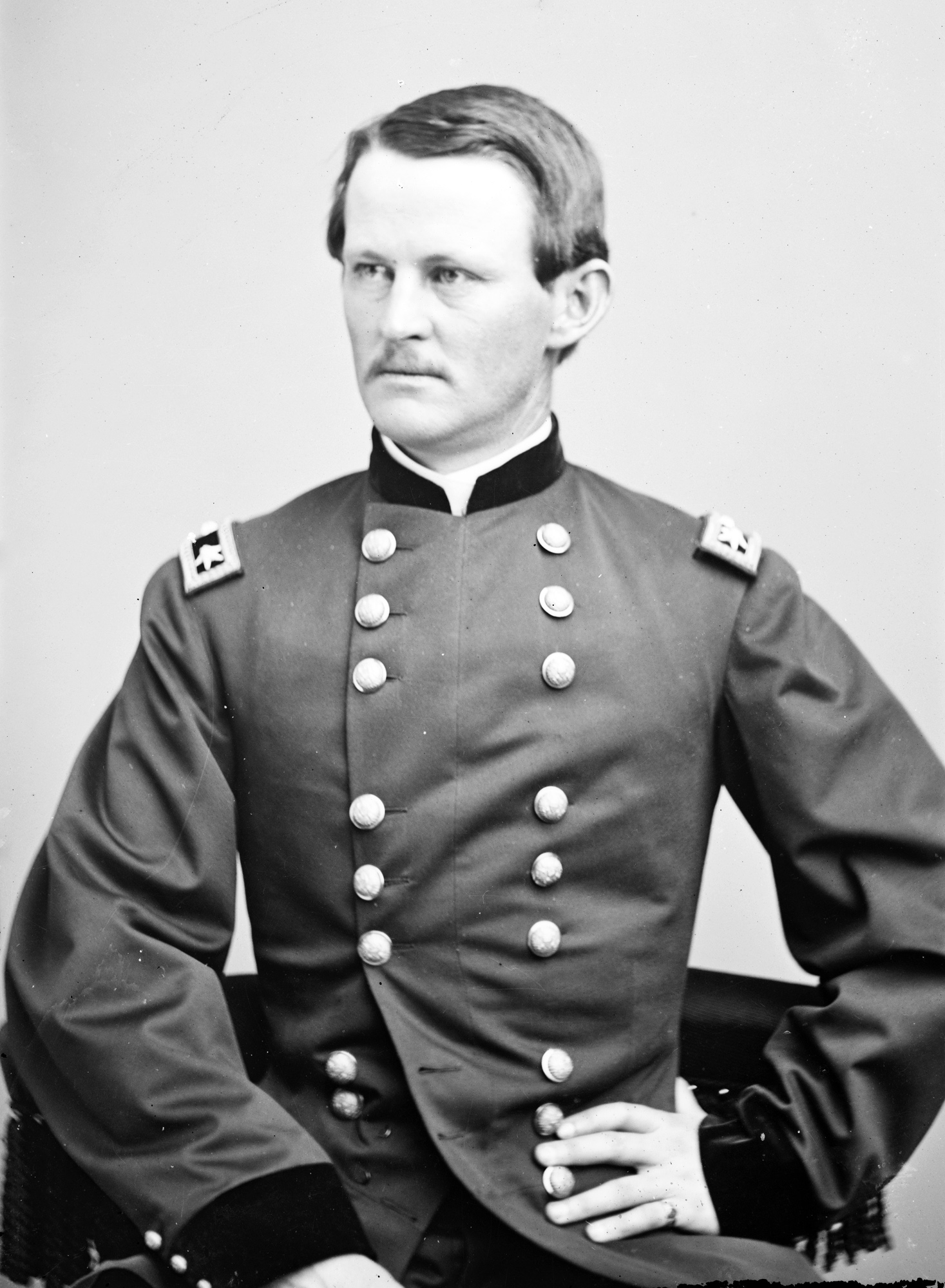
Military Governor Merritt

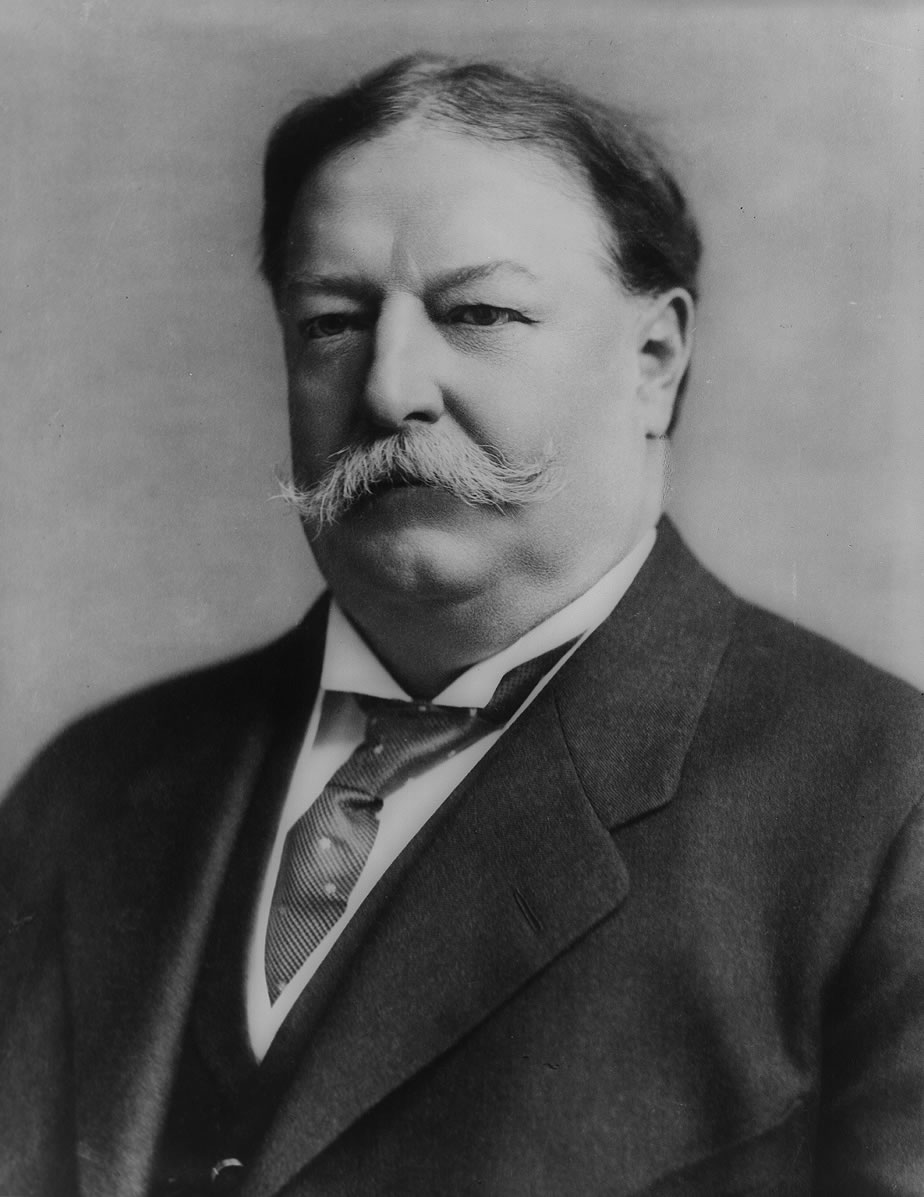
Civil Governor Taft

== See also ==
- List of sovereign state leaders in the Philippines
- President of the Philippines
- List of unofficial presidents of the Philippines
- Vice President of the Philippines
- Prime Minister of the Philippines
- Governor-General of the Philippines
- Filipino styles and honorifics

== Sources and references ==
- World Statesmen - Philippines
- Governors of the Philippines
- Aquino in 1986
