= Gugu Sarikula =

- 5th Sultan of Maguindanao
- Reign: 1585–1597
- Predecessor: Sultan Dimasangcay
- Successor: Kapitan Laut Buisan
Names
- Sultan Gugu Sarikula, Datu Sarikula
- House: Sultanate of Maguindanao
- Father: Datu Bangkaya
- Religion: Sunni Islam

Sultan Gugu Sarikula (alternative spellings Salikula or Salikura, reigned 1585-1597) was the fifth sultan of Maguindanao in the Philippines. Sarikula was a direct descendant of Sharif Kabungsuwan, the first sultan of Maguindanao. He was the son of Sultan Bangkaya and Matampay. Sarikula also had two half brothers, Dimasangcay Adel and Buisan, who also reigned as sultans of Maguindanao before and after him.

Sarikula was involved in a power struggle with Buisan, which ended with him being ousted by his younger brother to Sulu in 1597.

Sarikula married Raja Putri, one of the daughters (or a sister) of Sultan Muwallil Wasit (Rajah Bongsu) from the Sulu Sultanate. Their daughter, Putri Mampey, married her first cousin, Sultan Kudarat, the son of Buisan.

== See also ==
- Sultanate of Maguindanao
- Kapitan Laut Buisan
