= Tequitqui art in the Philippines =

Tequitqui art is a form of art formed by Mexican artists, carpenters, carvers, construction workers, architects and allied creative industries, during the Spanish era that incorporated both Indigenous Native American and Spanish cultural elements.

In the context of the Philippines, Alicia M. L. Coseteng described the churches of Argao (Cebu) and Pan-ay (Capiz) as being under the umbrella of Tequitqui art which she further elucidated as an ornamental style of vivacious grandeur. The term is borrowed from the Spanish critic José Moreno Villa, who also acquired it from the Aztec nomenclature and used it to describe Mexican church architecture. Argao at Cebu City, Pan-ay at Capiz City and other Tequitqui churches such as the Cagsawa Ruins of Albay, Bicol employ the use of Aztec and Mesoamerican headdresses as decorative layers in building sacred Christian spaces.

The Cagsawa Ruins, it's belltower decorations are based on Aztec Headdresses.

In addition to this, Juan de Ciscara, the Spanish military architect-engineer who designed Intramuros, the core of the City of Manila was also stationed in, Havana, Cuba; as well as Mexico City, Mexico for several decades. He had brought his experience of being inculturated to Tequitqui art into the engineering of Manila (Intramuros). He also brought these Tequitqui styes into the designs of the buildings in the provinces of Panay, Philippines and Departamento de Orán, Argentina. These provinces or municipalities were where he served as the governor for several decades and settled Spaniards and Latin Americans there in these colonial locations.
