= Kapitan Laut Buisan =

Buisan
- 6th Sultan of Maguindanao
- Reign: 1597–c. 1616/1619 (Note: According to historian Ruurdje Laarhove, Kudarat's reign as sultan began in 1616 based from Dutch annals.)
- Predecessor: Datu Salikula
- Successor: Muhammad Dipatuan Kudarat
- Died: 1616
Names
- Datu Katchil; Sultan Laut Buisan; Kapitan Laut Buisan
- Religion: Sunni Islam

Kapitan Laut Buisan (died: 1616, reigned: 1597–c. 1616/1619), also known as Datu Katchil or Sultan Laut Buisan, was the sixth Sultan of Maguindanao in the Philippines. He was a direct descendant of Shariff Kabungsuwan, a Muslim missionary who preached Islam in the Philippines and established the sultanate after marrying a Sulu princess in the 16th century. After his death, Lanao seceded from the sultanate of Maguindanao, creating the Lanao sultanates due to the Lanao datus' disapproval of Datu Kudarat, who became his successor.

== Life and career ==
Buisan was the younger half-brother of Sultan Dimasangcay Adil (reigned: 1578–1585) and Sultan Gugu Sarikula (reigned: 1585–1597), both having ties with the Sultanate of Sulu. He controlled his nephew, the Rajah Muda or crown prince, after displacing his older brother Sarikula. The Rajah Muda was Dimasangcay's son.

In 1597, Buisan lost at the Battle of Buayan. So, later, in 1602, he joined forces with Rajah Sirongan to raid Spanish settlements at Cuyo and Calamianes islands with 100 boats that could accommodate over 100 men each.

In 1603, Buisan captured a Jesuit cleric named Melchor Hurtado, thus assuring him enough influence to forge an alliance with the datus of Leyte. However, after an unsuccessful raid (pangangayaw as it was locally known) in 1606, Buisan distanced himself and the Rajah Muda away from Sirongan and established a new community by the Cotabato coast.

Earlier, on September 8, 1605, Sirongan had already signed a treaty with the Spanish, swearing allegiance to the King of Spain. The Spanish recognized that Sirongan had real power over Maguindanao and not Buisan. Sirongan then helped the Spanish in fighting the Portuguese in Malacca. Sirongan would then forge an alliance with Ternate and Sulu to attack the Spanish Empire. However soon enough, Sirongan's power waned.

=== Death and secession of Lanao ===
After his death in 1616, the succession for the sultanate need to be rotated in Lanao based from tradition. The son of Dimasangkay Adil of Lanao was chosen to be his successor. However, Datu Kudarat, due to his ambition of becoming sultan, lobbied Lanao and Maguindanao datus for support. His lobbying was received with displeasure among Lanao datus. As a result, Lanao seceded from the sultanate in 1616.

Buisan was succeeded by his son, Muhammad Dipatuan Kudarat (reigned: 1619–1671), who first distinguished himself in a raid in 1616.

== See also ==
- List of Sunni Muslim dynasties
