= American occupation of Cotabato =

The American occupation of Cotabato started in 1903 following the establishment of the Moro Province by the United States colonial government in the Philippines. American administration of the province replaced the authority of local Moro rulers, as well as the former Spanish colonial system.

The United States implemented administrative, legal, and educational reforms throughout the region. American forces attempted to integrate Cotabato into the broader colonial government. Though in 1914, the Moro Province was replaced by the Department of Mindanao and Sulu, marking the end of military rule.
