= Sultanate of Maguindanao =

1515-1926 state in Southeast Asia

Sultanate of Maguindanao Kasultanan nu Magindanaw كسولتانن نو مڬیندنو ᜆᜓᜆ᜔ᜐᜓ ᜋᜄᜒᜈ᜔ᜇᜈᜏ᜔
- 1515–1899 or 1926
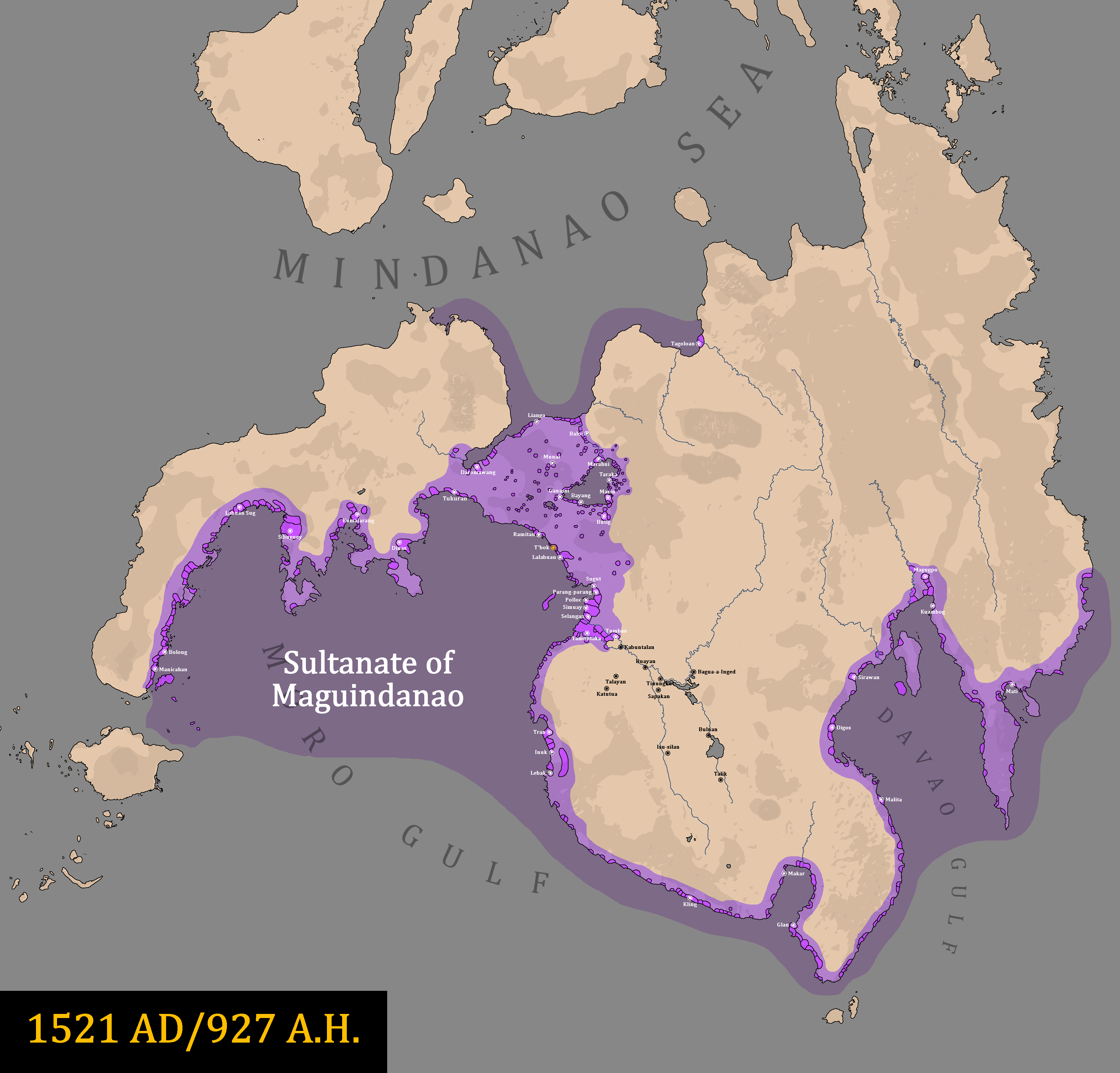
- Territory of the Sultanate of Maguindanao in 1521 (purple) and its subjects (light purple) according to various accounts.
- Capital: Tubok (1515–1543); Selangan (1543–1619; 1701–1711); Ramitan (1619–1637); Simuay (1639–1701); Tamontaka (1711–1861); Cotabato (1861–1888); Libungan (1896–1900); Sibugay (1900–1926)
- Common languages: Maguindanaon; Iranun; Maranao; Subanen languages; Manobo languages; Kalagan
- Religion: Sunni Islam
- Demonym: Magindanawn
- Government: Absolute monarchy
- Sultan
  - 1515–1543: Sharif Kabungsuwan
  - 1597–1619: Kapitan Laut Buisan
  - 1619–1671: Sultan Dipatuan Qudarat I
  - 1899: Sultan Mangigin
  - 2000-2006: Datu Amir Baraguir
- History
  - Established by Sharif Kabungsuwan: 1515
  - American occupation of Cotabato: December 1899
  - Death of Sultan Mangigin: 1926
  - Disestablished: 1899 or 1926
- Currency: Barter
Preceded by	Succeeded by
Prehistory of the Philippines	Insular Government of the Philippines; Moro Province
- Today part of: Philippines

The Sultanate of Maguindanao (Maguindanaon: Kasultanan nu Magindanaw, Jawi: كسولتانن نو مڬیندنو; Filipino: Kasultanan ng Mangindánaw) was a Sunni Muslim sultanate that ruled parts of the island of Mindanao, in the southern Philippines, especially in modern-day Maguindanao provinces (Maguindanao del Sur and Maguindanao del Norte), Soccsksargen, Zamboanga Peninsula and Davao Region.

Its known historical influence stretches from the peninsula of Zamboanga to bay of Sarangani until Davao Gulf. During the era of European colonization, the sultanate maintained friendly relations with British and Dutch traders.

== History ==
=== Chinese records ===
According to the Yuan annals of 1304 in the Nanhai Zhi, a polity known as Wenduling or Bintolang (Note: Wenduling is the Mandarin transliteration, while Bintolang is the Hokkien transliteration for the Chinese characters 文杜陵.) (文杜陵) was once a vassal state of Po-ni. According to Wang Zhenping, Wenduling may have been the predecessor state of Maguindanao. Wenduling was invaded by then Hindu-Buddhist Brunei (Pon-i), until it rebelled and successfully broke away after the Majapahit invasion of the latter. Islamization then happened afterwards. However, other studies, such as an earlier study by Wang Teh-ming (1964), suggest that Wenduling, known in Hokkien reading as Bintolang or 'Mintolong' was none other than Mindoro, and not Maguindanao. The location of Wenduling remains disputed.

=== Islamization and founding ===
Two brothers named Mamalu and Tabunaway lived peacefully in the Cotabato Valley on Mindanao and then Sharif Kabungsuwan from Johor in what is now modern day Malaysia, preached Islam in the area in the 16th century, Tabunaway converted, while Mamalu decided to hold fast to their ancestral animist beliefs. The brothers parted ways, with Tabunaway heading to the lowlands and Mamalu to the mountains, but they vowed to honor their kinship, and thus an unwritten pact of peace between Maguindanaons and the Teduray was forged through the two brothers.

Shariff Kabungsuwan preached Islam in the area, which was earlier Hindu-influenced from Srivijaya times, at the end of the 16th century and established himself as Sultan seated in Malabang. He exiled some of his people who apostatised to Cotabato. He subsequently married into the families of local chieftains and established the Sultanate of Maguindanao, with its seat in Slangan (the western part of present-day Cotabato), making him virtually Sultan of the whole island. The sultanate was largely centered around the Cotabato Valley.

=== Incorporation and secession of Lanao ===
During a time when Lanao fell under the control of the Maguindanao sultanate, there was centralized sultanate leadership in Lanao and Maguindanao using a rotation technique for leadership between these two regions, ruled by one head of state. When a predecessor sultan came from Maguindanao, then the successor sultan would be from Lanao, and vice versa. This tradition was first introduced during the reign of Sultan Sharīf Kabunsuan. He was then succeeded by a Maranao sultan, Sharīf Makaalang, and continued on with the royals' descendents. In the 17th century, however, Lanao seceded from the Maguindanao sultanate due to Lanao datus' disapproval of Datu Kudarat for becoming sultan.

=== War with Spain ===
Sultan Muhammad Kudarat, and whose name as a youth was Ullah Untong, was one of the greatest sultans who controlled Mindanao. In his island sanctuary in Sulu, he was known as Sultan Nasiruddin, and is buried there. His grandson Abd al-Rahman continued increasing the Sultanate's power and influence.

The Maguindanao sultanate also had a close alliance with the Ternate sultanate of the Moluccas region of Indonesia. Ternate regularly sent military reinforcements to Maguindanao during the Spanish-Moro Wars.

Nevertheless, its power was reduced when the Confederate Sultanates of Lanao declared independence from the Maguindanao Sultanate.

During the Spanish colonial period, the Sultanate of Maguindanao was able to defend its territory, preventing the Spaniards from colonizing the entire coastal Mindanao and ceding the island of Palawan to the Spanish government in 1705. The island priory ceded to him by Sulu Sultan Sahabuddin. This was to have help dissuade Spanish encroachments into the island of Maguindanao and Sulu itself.

Chinese gongs, yellow as a color of royalty, and idioms of Chinese origin entered Mindanao culture. Royalty was connected to yellow. The color yellow was used by the Sultan in Mindanao. Chinese tableware and gongs were exported to the Moros.

Merchant Chinese were tranquilly residing alongside the Moros in Maguindanao.

== Government and politics ==
Similar to neighboring sultanates, Maguindanao was decentralized; every town remained autonomous and ruled by their rajas, datus, etc. However, aspects of centralized authority lay in some sectors of governance absolutely controlled by the sultan. (TBE)

=== Diplomacy ===
Maguindanao maintained close relations with Ternate, Sulu, and Brunei, but developed a rivalry with Buayan. However, Buayan would become a de facto subject state under Sultan Kudarat of Maguindanao. (TBE)

== Economy ==
Since the ratification of a peace treaty between Muslims and Christians in 1645 by Kudarat and Zamboanga governor Francisco de Atienza Ibañez, the following period of relative stability ushered an economic golden age as Maguindanao reopened its harbors to international trade, first based in Kudarat's capital of Simuay (present-day Sultan Mastura).

Maguindanao's economy was principally driven by two sectors: trade exports of raw materials like agricultural and jungle produce, and slave labor; it did not maintain a market large enough for imported spices, gold, silk, and other exotic goods. Consequently, this model largely relied on annual outgoing trade expeditions led by Chinese nakodas accompanying trading chiefs most frequently to Ternate and Manila, and regularly to Amboina, Makassar, Batavia and elsewhere in Java, and around Sumatra.

Within Maguindanao, the sa ilud principalities served as entrepôts for both domestic and foreign trade and the sa raya region as its breadbasket. Several economic reforms were made under Kudarat: wax was monopolized in Sarangani and the Davao Gulf ports, and restricted trade in the former only by permission with a license from the Sultan himself. He also acquired shahbandars to oversee the trade and commodities sectors.

=== Exports ===
The most important exports were rice, wax, tobacco, and clove and cinnamon barks, alongside coconut oil, sago, beans, tortoiseshells, bird's nests, and ebony hardwood.

=== Slavery ===
- Several policies of attraction
  - Slave raids across islands and mountains
  - Escaped slaves accommodated at Simoay
    - Included Malays, Bugis, Ternatans, Ambonese, Burmese, Makassarese, even from as far as coastal India
    - Only Sultan permits slave sales, otherwise risk beheading
  - Pagali method

== Culture and society ==
=== Demographics ===
The people of Maguindanao are certainly known under one name, but consist of many different nations.

— Sultan Barahaman in a letter written in 1693 to a Dutch governor in Ternate

At its peak, Maguindanao maintained a diverse mosaic of indigenous ethnicities and communities; besides the Maguindanaon themselves, under various forms of vassalage were Iranun (including Maranao), Sama-Bajau, Subanon, Sarangani, and Kalagan peoples, while in more mutual yet interdependent trade-based relationships were highlander Tirurays and Manobos. It absorbed a large number of Arabic vocabulary and culture after Islamization.

==== Iranun ====
The Iranun peoples settled along the coasts of the entire Illana Bay, including the Pulangi and Simuay deltas and Polloc harbor, and further inland along the shore of Lake Lanao as Maranaos. Although they were autonomously led by their datus, they were vassals of the Sultan from paying tributes and formal acknowledgements. During Barahaman's reign, their population was estimated to be around 90,000-100,000.

Alongside the Bajaus, they were the most important allies of the Maguindanao; the sultanate heavily depended on their vast manpower to maintain the status quo throughout the region. Paradoxically, however, they were also perceived by Maguindanao royalty as the least trustworthy of all groups; they were apparently notorious for rogue activities, and several punitive expeditions were made to quell minor Iranun uprisings. European traders were sometimes advised to sail south of the predominantly Iranun Polloc area into the Simuay River if heading towards the capital for safety, and were denied permanent trading posts for the same reason.

==== Sama-Bajau ====
The Sama-Bajau, or simply Badjaos, of Maguindanao were primarily based around the Simuay delta, though they were nomads who lived on the shorelines and did not live in permanent settlements like the Iranun; additionally, they were particularly barred from living within the capital itself, though nearby.

Small in numbers, they were typically fishermen who supplied sea produce for trading vessels and Maguindaon land dwellers, sometimes sailing as far as the Tomini Gulf for catches. However, they were also called upon for a variety of other jobs ranging from supplying boats, joining slave raiding expeditions, and as boat rowing entourage for royalty and other esteemed officials alongside more dangerous jobs as the Sultan's envoys, interpreters, tribute collection from the coastal settlements, and as river guardians.

==== Subanon ====
The Subanon peoples of the Zamboanga peninsula were also vassals of the sultanate. Aside from offering manpower, they were entrusted with two main roles: production and trade of local cinnamon (Cinnamomum mindanaense) and maintaining storage networks for the Maguindanao's hardware, especially cannons.

==== Tiruray ====
The Tirurays of the southern Tiruray Highlands and its coast held a mutual but interdependent position with the sultanate largely defined by trade. Trade pacts were established between Magindanaon datus and Tiruray neighborhoods through seketas teel ("cutting rattan together"). They largely traded forest and some agricultural produce like wax, tobacco, as well as manpower.

==== Manobo ====
Manobos comprise a variety of different highland peoples in the northern and western mountains surrounding the Cotabato Basin, and like the Tirurays, held largely mutual trade relationships with the sultanate. Manobo territories were outside the margins of any Maguindanao control and considered too dangerous. Consequently, trade activity was restricted to only between them and the royal family and principal datus. They mostly traded gold for clothing.

==== Sarangani ====
Since its capture in 1625, the people of the Sarangani islands were subjugated by Maguindanao through various enforced trade policies in that area, and may be considered slaves of the sultanate than merely subjects.

Aside from serving as the Sultan's primary warehouse, Kudarat restricted their trading activities with foreigners through his personal permission for a license, except for several Chinese in wax trading. The islands' crossroads position served various professions for the sultanate, from ship repair, agricultural produce, wood, water, and manpower.

==== Kalagan ====
Otherwise known in historical accounts as simply peoples of the Davao Gulf area, Kalagans were also subject to similar protectionist trade restrictions by Maguindanao since Kudarat's reign. Maguindanao since shared control of the area with Kandahar (Sangir) until usurpation by the former during Sultan Barahaman's rule.

Probably only the town of present-day Davao and nearby settlements were subjugated and paid tribute. Like Sarangani, they offered manpower and agricultural and forest goods.

Kalanganan, another settlement elsewhere in the region, had its own tributaries inland and did not pay tribute to Maguindanao, but provided food and traded wax and lower prices for visiting Maguindanaon traders.

=== Architecture ===
Much of the architecture of the Sultanate is described in an 1683 travel journal written by visiting English explorer and privateer William Dampier. All houses of every social standing were built on posts like elsewhere in Southeast Asia, ranging from 14 to 20 feet high. The ground floor either open-air or enclosed for varying purposes like chicken and duck coops or free space. All roofs were thatched with palm leaves.

During the reign of Sultan Barahaman, the tulugan, or royal palace, of the Sultan was described to be supported by 180 large, thick tree posts and was uniquely served by a broad stairway. The first room upon entering was noted to be flanked by 20 lantakas placed on gun carriages. Like all other houses, however, the tulugan was a single-story complex consisting of many partitioned rooms, yet towered substantially over the rest of town. Facing the entrance from a short distance is a small low-lying reception hall to accommodate foreign ambassadors and merchants.

== List of sultans of Maguindanao ==
Historical records document 24 sultans of Maguindanao.

Reign	Name	Capital	Information and events		
1515-1543	Sharif Ali Kabungsuwan, styled Sultan Aliwya	Malabang	Johore prince who settled in Malabang around 1515. Descendant of Hassan ibn Ali, son of Fatimah, daughter of Muhammad. Married into various local royal families and founded the Maguindanao Sultanate.		
1543-?	Sharif Makaalang		Son of Sharif Kabungsuwan and Angintabu, of Malabang Iranun royalty. Also known in tarsilas and Spanish records alike as Saripada.		
?-1578	Datu Bangkaya		Son of Sharif Makaalang. Probably offered friendship with the Spaniards in 1574.		
1578-1585	Datu Dimasangkay		Son of Bangkaya who ruled at old age. Legendary ancestor of all Iranun and Maranao datus.		
1585-1597	Gugu Sarikula		Half brother of Dimasangkay who was probably exiled to Jolo for rebelling. Married into Sulu royalty.		
1597-1619	Kapitan Laut Buisan		Younger half-brother of both Dimasangkay and Salikula, also called Katchil.		
1619-1671	Sultan Kudarat	Lamitan (1619-1637) Simuay (1637-1671)	Son of Buisan. First to unite sa ilud and sa raya polities and opened Simuay as a free trading port, consolidating tribute over many Iranun, Maranao, Manobo, and Tirurays, as well as Sarangani and Davao by force. Also called Nasir-udin by grandchildren.		
	Sultan Dundang Tidulay	Simuay	Son of Kudarat who died earlier than him. Probably ruled for a very brief period of time. Called Saif ud-Din by grandchildren.		
?-1683-?	Sultan Barahaman	Simuay	Son of Tidulay. Also known as Muhammad Shah by his children, Minulu sa Rahmatullah, and Almo Sabat (Ar. Al Mu-Thabbat).		
	Sultan Kahar Ud-din Kuda	Simuay	Younger brother of Barahaman Also known as Jamal ul-'Azam, Amir ul-‘Umara, and Maulana. A botched offer for alliance with Sultan Shahab ud-Din of Sulu became a pitched battle between both Sultanates, ending with his murder in 1702 personally by Shabab ud-Din himself.		
	Sultan Bayan Ul-Anwar	Slangan	Son of Barahaman. Also known as Jalal ud-Din and Dipatuan during his lifetime, and Mupat Batua after death. His younger brother, Ja'far Sadiq, attempted to revolt against him but kept the throne.		
	Sultan Muhammad Ja'far Sadiq Manamir	Tamontaka	Younger brother of Bayan Ul-Anwar. Also known as Amir ud-Din and Maulana during his lifetime and posthumously as Shahid Mupat.		
????-1748	Sultan Muhammad Tahir Ud-din	Tamontaka	A son of Sultan Bayan ul-Anwar, he was commonly known to the Spaniards as "Dipatuan Malinug". He was also known as Muhammad Shah Amir ud-Din. In a battle in 1733, he killed his uncle Ja’far Sadiq Manamir. In 1736, his father started sharing with him the responsibilities of government. His authority was however contested by two of his cousins, sons of Manamir, forcing him to retire to the interior where he died in Buayan around 1748.		
1748-1755	Sultan Muhammad Khair ud-Din	Tamontaka	Son of Sultan Ja’far Sadiq. Also known as Pakir Maulana Kamsa (Arabic: Faqir Maulana Hamzah) or Amir ud-Din Hamza. He also used the name ‘Azim ud-Din and assumed the title Amir al-Mu'minin ("Commander of the Faithful"). In 1733, after his father was slain, he began to consider himself heir to the throne and thereupon styled himself the Rajah Muda. The next year, he was formally invested with the duties of a sultan in the presence of the Spanish officials from Zamboanga. With some Spanish aid, he was able to consolidate his position in Tamontaka and contest the rule of his uncle Bayan ul-Anwar and later that of his cousin Malinug. But upon the latter's death around 1748, the struggle for the sultanate ceased. Pakir Maulana Kamsa emerged as paramount chief of Maguindanao. Around 1755, he started to relinquish some of his powers to his younger brother with the condition that his son, Kibad Sahriyal, would be the Rajah Muda.		
1755-1780(?)	Sultan Pahar Ud-din		Younger brother of Pakir Maulan Kamsa. Also known as Datu Pongloc or Panglu, and posthumously as Mupat Hidayat. He began to exercise the powers of sultan around 1755 and was in the sultan's seat in that same year during Captain Thomas Forrest's visit in Maguindanao.		
1780(?)-1805	Sultan Kibad Sahriyal		His more regal title was Muhammad ‘Azim ud-Din Amir ul-Umara. He was a son of Pakir Maulana Kamsa. Even before the death of his uncle the Sultan, he was already being addressed as “sultan”. He was friendly towards the Spaniards and at least twice entered into peaceful negotiations with them, namely, in 1780 and 1794. He probably governed from 1780 to 1805.		
1805-1830	Sultan Kawasa Anwar Ud-din		Son of Kibad Sahriyal and like his father was also entitled Amir ul-‘Umara. Also known as Iskandar Julkarnain. He entered into a peace treaty with the Spaniards in 1805. He possibly reigned from 1805 to 1830.		
1830-1854	Sultan Iskandar Qudrallah Muhammad Zamal Ul-Azam		Grandson of Kibad Sahriyal and a nephew of Sultan Kawasa. Also known as Iskandar Qudarat Pahar-ud-Din or more popularly as Sultan Untong. In 1837 and 1845, he entered into friendly treaties with the Spaniards. He died either in 1853 and 1854.		
1854-1883	Sultan Muhammad Makakwa		Grandson of Kawasa Anwar ud-Din. His rule can be estimated to have lasted from about 1854 to 1884. He died in Nuling (present-day municipality of Sultan Kudarat).		
1884-1888	Sultan Muhammad Jalal Ud-din Pablu	Banubu	Son of Makakwa. Also known as Sultan Wata. His capital was at Banubu, just opposite the town of Cotabato across the Pulangi. He died in 1888.		
1896-1926	Sultan Mangigin	Cotabato (1896-1900) Sibugay (1900-1926)	Grandson of the famous Datu Dakula of Sibugay, who was a grandson of Kibad Sahriyal (No. 16). He began his rule in 1896. From 1888 to 1896, the Sultanate experienced an interregnum, possibly because Datu Uto (Sultan Anwar ud-Din of Buayan) wanted his brother-in-law Datu Mamaku (a son of Sultan Qudratullah Untong) to become Sultan. The Spaniards, however, wanted the sultanate to go to one of the Sibugay datus. In December 1900, Sultan Mangigin transferred his residence from Cotabato to Sibugay. In 1906, he married Rajah Putri, the widow of Datu Uto and sister of Datu Mamaku. He eventually retired and died peacefully in Sibugay in 1926.		
1926-1938	Sultan Muhammad Hijaban Iskandar Mastura Kudarat		Acceded the throne upon Mangigin's death in 1926. By this time, the Sultanate assumed a more ceremonial, traditional character. It continued to be the central institution for traditional and religious affairs of the Maguindanao and Iranun peoples.		
	Sultan Tato Esmael		Assumed the role of Sultan when the eldest grandson of Sultan Mastura, Datu Baraguir refused to become Sultan. The latter was supposedly the most legitimate claimant as matter of right: His father, Datu Mamadra – who could have succeeded – predeceased Sultan Mastura, the incumbent.	1990-2000	Sultan Muhammad Gutierez Baraguir

=== Pretenders ===
As of May 2018, there are three major royal families in Maguindanao. Each having an enthroned sultan under the Sultanate of Maguindanao, Kingdom of Buayan, and Domain of Allah Valley.

=== Genealogy ===
Family tree of Maguindanao monarchs

Adnan
Ma'ad
Nizar
Mudar
Ilyas
Mudrikah
Khuzaymah
Kinana
Al-Nadr
Malik
Fihr
Ghalib
Lu'ayy
Ka'b
Murrah
Kilab
Qusayy
Abd Manaf
Hashim
Abd al-Muttalib
Abu Talib	Abdullah
Muhammad
Fatima
Husayn ibn Ali
Ali al-Sajjad
Muhammad al-Baqir
Ja'far al-Sadiq
Ali al-Uraydhi
Isa Al-Rumi
Ahmad al-Muhajir
Ubaydullah
Ali Al-Awwal
Muhammad Sahib Al-Sawmaah
Alawi Ath-Thani
Ali Khali Al Qasim
Sayyid Al Mirbat
Ali
Muhammad Faqih Al Muqaddam
Sayyid Alawi Al Ghayur
Ali Mawla Al-Darak
Muhammad Mawla Al-Dawilah
Abdul Rahman As-Saqqaf
Abu Bakr As-Sakhran
Abdullah Al Saqqaf (Al-Aydarus)
Abu Bakr Al Aydarus
Abdallah Al Aydarus
Shaykh Al Aydarus
Abdallah Al Aydarus
Ali Zayn al-Abidin	Daughter of a Sultan
^{1} Sharif; Muhammad; Kabungsuwan r. 1515-1543	Angintabu
^{2} Sharif; Maka-alang r. 1543-1574
^{3} Sharif; Bangkaya r. 1574-1578
^{4} Dimasangcay; Adel r. 1578-1585	^{5} Gugu; Sarikula r. 1585-1597	^{6} Kapitan; Laut Buisan r. 1597-1619
Putri Mampey	^{7} Muhammad; Dipatuan; Kudarat r. 1619-1671
^{8} Dundang; Tidulay r. 1671-1675
^{9} Barahaman r. 1675-1699	^{10} Kaharuddin; Kuda r. 1699-1702
^{11} Bayanul; Anwar r. 1702-1736	^{12} Muhammad; Ja’far Sadiq; Manamir r. 1710-1733
^{13} Muhammad; Tahiruddin r. 1736-1748	^{14} Muhammad; Khairuddin r. 1733-1755	^{15} Paharuddin r. 1755-after 1780
^{16} Kibad Sahriyal r. c. 1780-1805
^{17} Kawasa; Anwaruddin r. 1805-1830	Raja Muda; Alamansa (Mupat sa Dansalan)
Amirul	Raja Muda; Tuwa	Datu Dakula
^{19} Muhammad; Makakwa r. 1854-1884	Datu Idris	^{18} Kudaratullah; Untong r. 1830-1854	Pugat
^{20} Muhammad; Jalaluddin; Pablu r. 1884-1888	Watamama; Kalug	^{22} Mastura; Kudarat r. 1926-1938	^{21} Mangigin r. 1896-1926
^{23} Muhammad; Ismail; Kalug r. 1938-1991
^{24} Muhammad; Baraguir r. 1991-2000
^{25} Sayyid Amir; Baraguir r. 2000-2006
?
^{26} Sayyidona Zamzamin r. 2006-present

== See also ==
- List of Sunni Muslim dynasties
  - Sultanate of Buayan
  - Four States of Lanao
  - Sultanate of Sulu
  - Sultanate of Ternate
  - Sultanate of Johor
