= Muhammad Kudarat =

Muhammad Dipatuan Kudarat محمد دڤتوان كودرت
- Monument for Kudarat in Cotabato City

7th Sultan of Maguindanao
- Reign: c. 1616/1619 (Note: According to historian Ruurdje Laarhove, Kudarat's reign as sultan began in 1616 based from Dutch annals.)–1671
- Predecessor: Sultan Kapitan Laut Buisan
- Successor: Sultan Saifuddin Dundang Tidulay
- Born: Muhammad Dipatuan Kudarat; 1581; Sultanate of Maguindanao
- Died: 1671 (aged 89–90); Sultanate of Maguindanao
- House: Al-'Aydarus
- Father: Sultan Laut Buisan
- Religion: Islam

Muhammad Dipatuan Kudarat (or Muhammad di-Pertuan Kudrat; Jawi: محمد دڤتوان كودرت; 1581–1671) was the 7th Sultan of Maguindanao from c. 1616 or c. 1619 to 1671.

He was a direct descendant of Shariff Kabungsuwan, a Malay-Arab noble from Johor who brought Islam to Mindanao between the 13th and 14th centuries. During his reign, he successfully fought off Spanish invasions and halted the spread of Catholicism on the island of Mindanao, much like the other Muslim rulers in the southern Philippines.

The Soccsksargen province of Sultan Kudarat is named after him, as is the municipality of Sultan Kudarat, Maguindanao del Norte, where his descendants, who bear the title of datu, engage in present-day politics.

== Name and titles ==
In the name and titles of Sultan Muhammad Dipatuan Kudarat, Muhammad Dipatuan Kurlat in Maguindanaon or Muhammad di-Pertuan Kudrat in Malay, the Maguindanaon term Dipatuan is from the Malay title di-Pertuan which means "ruler" or "owner" and literally means "the one who has been made to rule".

The term Kudarat is ultimately from Arabic qudrat which means "power". This was sometimes pronounced as Kurlát in Maguindanao, following the regular sound changes from /d/ to /r/ and /r/ to /l/ for loanwords in the language, something that is also observed in other Philippine languages like Tagalog and Cebuano. This term is also present in Malay as kudrat.

== Enthronement ==
After Sultan Laut Buisan died in 1616, it was expected that the successor sultan would be from Lanao based from tradition. However, Kudarat, who had ambition of becoming sultan, lobbied Maguindanao and Lanao datus for support. This resulted with displeasure from the Lanao datus. Lanao eventually seceded from Maguindanao in 1616, creating the Lanao sultanates. Approximately that same year, Kudarat also had an armistice with Buayan rajas and strike an agreement for the prevention of raids.

According to historian Ruurdje Laarhove, Kudarat's reign as sultan began approximately in 1616 based from Dutch annals. However, other sources put the date at approximately in 1619.

== Reign ==
In 1619–1621, Kudarat also engaged in an alliance with the Dutch through their trading company, the Dutch East India Company to which he sold rice and slaves captured from the Visayas. He also played off the Dutch against the Spaniards, who were regional rivals in Southeast Asia at the time, both aiming to influence local rulers to gain access to their trading ports in hopes of monopolizing the spice trade.

In 1627, the next year, the Dutch sent an ambassador to discuss for a concerted effort against the Spanish invasion. Kudarat knew that the Dutch soldiers were using him as a tool for their own imperialistic policies.

In 1637, Governor General Sebastian Hurtado de Corcuero sent a conqueror expedition to the land. Kudarat had a large quantity of gunpowder and firearms, and his fort was strongly fortified. The Spaniards capture 8 bronze cannons, 27 lantaka or culverins, and 100 muskets. The enemies dropped his walls in Lamitan. However, Kudarat escaped to the mountains and there gathered strength and force to continue his fight against the Spanish invaders.

In 1639, the Spaniards invaded the lands of the Maranaos. Kudarat hurried there to have a conference with the datus of Lake Lanao. He explained to them the effects of submitting to the Spaniards and appealed to Maranao pride and love of independence. In a matter of months, the Spaniards were forced to leave the lands of the Maranaos for safer parts towards Zamboanga, (Fort Pilar), and never ventured to inland Lanao again.

The famous speech of Sultan Kudarat is recorded by a Spanish ambassador to the Maguindanao Sultanate:

You men of the Lake! Forgetting your ancient liberty, have submitted to the Castilians. Such submission is sheer stupidity. You cannot realize to what your surrender binds you. You are selling yourselves into slavery to toil for the benefit of these foreigners. Look at the regions that have already submitted to them. Note how abject is the misery to which their peoples are now reduced. Behold the condition of the Tagalogs and of the Visayans whose chief men are trampled upon by the meanest Castilian. If you are of no better spirit than these, then you must expect similar treatment. You, like them, will be obliged to row in the galleys. Just as they do, you will have to toil at the shipbuilding and labor without ceasing on other public works. You can see for yourselves that you will experience the harshest treatment while thus employed. Be men. Let me aid you to resist. All the strength of my Sultanate, I promise you, shall be used in your defense! What matters it if the Castilians at first are successful? That means only the loss of a year's harvest. Do you think that too dear a price to pay for liberty?

True to the speech, the Maranaos after offering patient defense, thereafter enjoyed 250 years of peace during the whole duration of Spanish withdrawal in the archipelago in 1899.

By the end of 1639, an understanding was also reached between Kudarat and Datu Maputi for a united front against the Spanish invaders. Datu Manakior, Datu of Tawlan, previously friendly with the Spaniards, at this time began to really suffer serious reverses in Mindanao with his European allies.

Finally, Governor-General Diego Fajardo Chacón signed a treaty with Kudarat on June 25, 1645 which allowed Spanish missionaries to minister to the needs of the Christians in Mindanao, even allowed a church built, and trade was allowed in the sultan's territories. Kudarat died in 1671 at age of 89–90 in Simuay, now part of Sultan Kudarat in Maguindanao del Norte.

== Gallery ==
Historical marker of Sultan Kudarat in Cotabato City

== Notes ==
Regnal titles
Preceded by Sultan Laut Buisan	Sultan of Maguindanao; 1619–1671	Succeeded by Sultan Dundang Tidulay
Preceded by Sultan Mawallil Wasit	Sultan of Sulu as Sultan Nasir ud-Din II; 1645–1648	Succeeded by Sultan Salah ud-Din Bakhtiar
