= Sharif Kabungsuwan =

Muhammad Kabungsuwan
- 1st Sultan of Maguindanao
- Reign: 1515–1543
- Successor: Sultan Maka-alang Saripada
- Born: unknown Johore
- Died: 1543; Maguindanao
- Burial: Butig, Lanao del Sur
- Spouses: Putri Tunina (Rajah Tabunaway's daughter); Angintabo (Iranun princess)
- Issue: Sultan Maka-alang Saripada; Dayang Daragat; Layagun; Aloyodan nine other children
Names
- Muhammad Shariff Kabungsuan
- House: Al-'Aydarus
- Father: Sayyid Zainal Abidin Al-Aydarus (Tun Dagang)
- Mother: Daughter of Sultan Iskandar Zhulkarnain of Malacca
- Religion: Sunni Islam Sufism

Shariff Muhammed Kabungsuwan (Maguindanaon: Muhammad Kabunsuan, Jawi: شريف کبوڠسوان; Malay: Muhammad Kebungsuwan, Jawi: شريف کبوڠسووان) was the first Sultan of Maguindanao in the Philippines. A native of Johore in Maritime Southeast Asia, Kabungsuwan re-settled in Mindanao in the Philippines where he preached Islam to the native tribes around the region.

== Origin ==
Maguindanao genealogy records state that Kabungsuwan's father was an Arab and a sharif or a descendant of the Islamic prophet Muhammad while his mother was Malay. His recorded name "Kabungsuwan" in Maguindanao tradition means "youngest" and is said to be the youngest among three children. His eldest brother, Ahmad is said to have established the Bruneian Sultanate while his other brother Alawi is said to have set up the Sulu Sultanate.

== Mission work in Mindanao ==
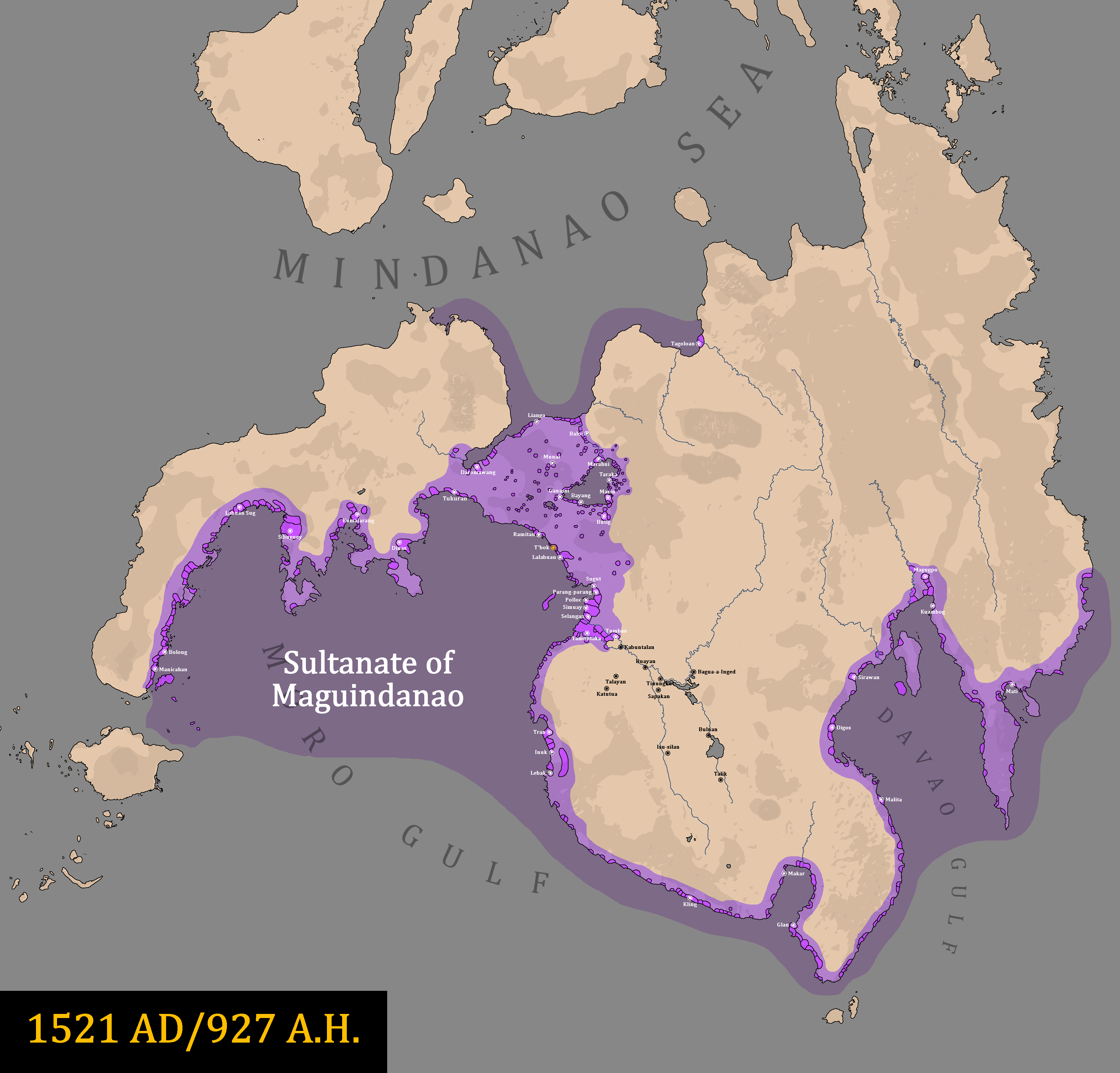
The Sultanate of Maguindanao under Shariff Kabungsuwan in 1521.

The Sunni scholar Kabungsuwan is generally regarded as the one who introduced Islam in the Lanao and Maguindanao areas in Mindanao arriving in the area in the early 16th century. There are several tarsilas or written genealogy on Kabungsuwan though most of these state that he brought in men when he landed in Mindanao, his group are composed of seafarers, there was initial force with his group's interaction with the locals and that there were already Muslims in Mindanao when his Kangungsuwan and his men landed near the mouth of the Pulangi River. Kabungsuwan formed alliances with influential royal families of Sulu, Borneo, and Ternate. This led to Islam becoming the dominant religion around Lake Lanao by the 19th century.

== Personal life ==
Kabungsuwan traded in T'buk, old name of Malabang, Lanao.

Kabungsuwan was of Arab-Malay ethnicity. He married a local princess and established the Sultanate of Maguindanao in the 16th century. The sultanate was usually centered in the valley of Cotabato.

== Legacy ==
The former province of Shariff Kabunsuan in the Philippines was named after him.

== Notes ==
Regnal titles
| Preceded by none Establishment | Sultan of Maguindanao; 1520–1543 | Succeeded by Sultan Maka-alang Saripada |
