= Bathala =

Supreme deity according to the indigenous religious beliefs of the Tagalog people

Bathalà/Maykapál
- The Supreme Being and Creator of the Universe
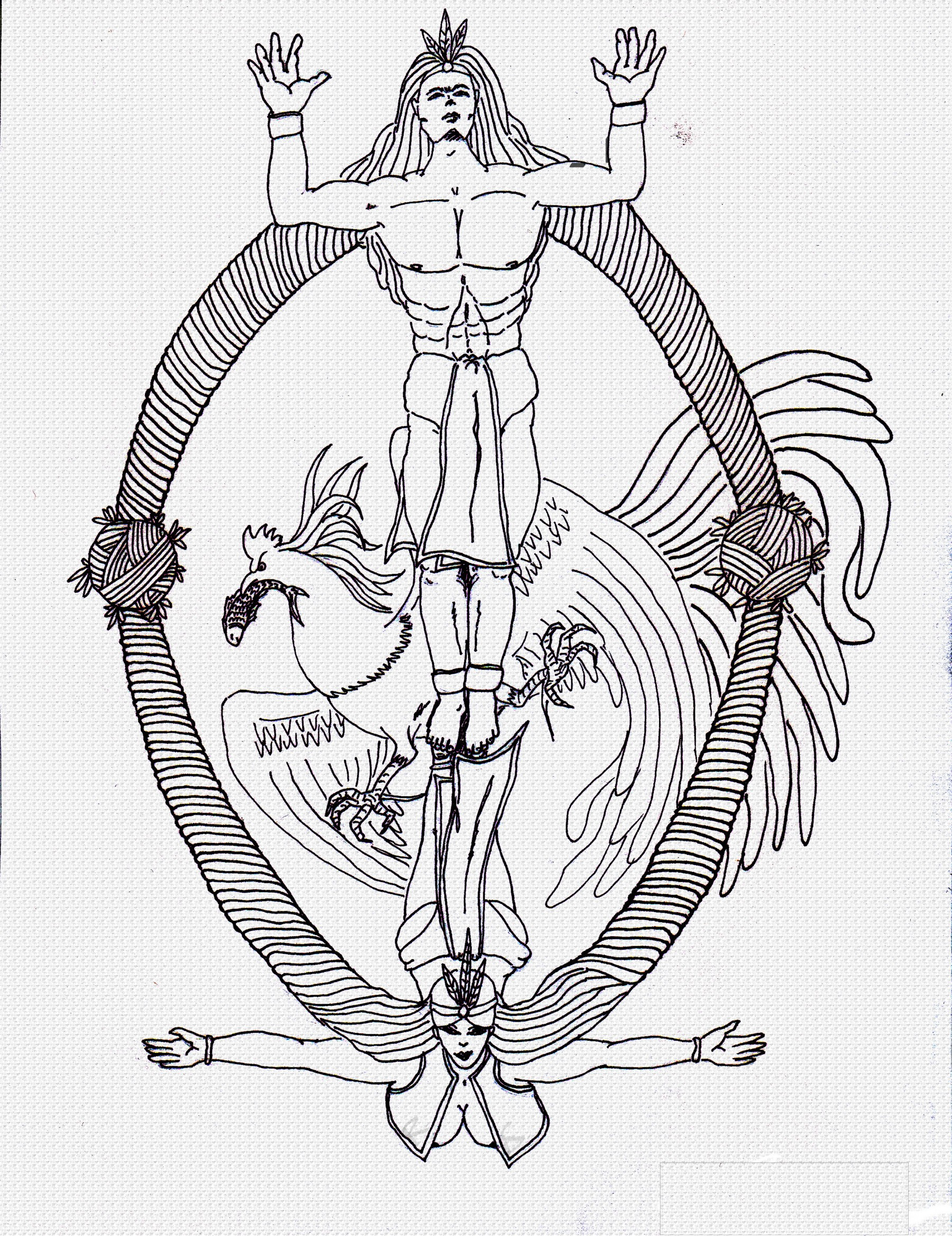
- An illustration depicting Bathalà, a Diwatà and the bird Sarim
- Abode: Kaluwálhatian
- Symbol: Tigmamanukin
- Adherents: Pre-Hispanic Tagalogs

Equivalents
- Greek: Uranus, Phanes
- Hindu: Prajapati
- Roman: Caelus
- Yoruba: Olodumare
- Chinese: Shangdi
- Israelite: YHWH

In the indigenous religion of the ancient Tagalogs, Bathalà/Maykapál was the transcendent Supreme God, the originator and ruler of the universe. He is commonly known and referred to in the modern era as Bathalà, a term or title which, in earlier times, also applied to lesser beings such as personal tutelary spirits, omen birds, comets, and other heavenly bodies which the early Tagalog people believed predicted events. It was after the arrival of the Spanish missionaries in the Philippines in the 16th century that Bathalà /Maykapál came to be identified with the Christian God, hence its synonymy with Diyós. Over the course of the 19th century, the term Bathala was totally replaced by Panginoón (Lord) and Diyós (God). It was no longer used until it was popularized again by Filipinos who learned from chronicles that the Tagalogs' indigenous God was called Bathalà.

== Etymology ==
Most scholars believed that Bathalà (Chirino 1595–1602), Badhala (Plasencia 1589), Batala (Loarca 1582), or Bachtala (Boxer Codex 1590) was derived from the Sanskrit word bhattara or bhattaraka (noble lord) which appeared as the sixteenth-century title batara in the southern Philippines and Borneo. In the Indonesian language, batara means "god"; its feminine counterpart is batari. In Malay, betara means "holy", and was applied to the greater Hindu gods in Java. Betara was also assumed by the ruler of Majapahit.

Dr. Pardo de Tavera, a linguist, states that bhattala could have come from avatara, avatar; that is, the descent of a god on earth in a visible form, such as the ten avatars of Vishnu. According to John Crawfurd, the Malay word Batara is derived from avatara both in "sense and orthography", and is a prefix to connote any deity.

According to Jose Rizal's former mentor Rev. Pablo Pastells, S.J., who reprinted in 1900 the early work of his fellow Jesuit, Fr. Pedro Chirino, Labor Evangelica, which was first published in 1663 from an anonymous document dated April 20, 1572, the name of Bathala can be ascertained "by resolving the word into its primary elements, Batà and Ala = 'Son God, or Son of God.'" This is why the first missionaries did not deprive the natives of this name when they instructed them about the existence of God and the mysteries of the Trinity, the incarnation, and redemption, as states an anonymous but very circumstantial relation written in Manila, on April 20, 1572.

Other possible origins of the term Bathala or Batala are the Malay word Berhala ("idol") and the Arabic expression ‘Allah-ta’ala ("God, be exalted"), which is the origin of Bathala’s other name Anatala.

== Mentions during Spanish colonial era ==
The name of the supreme being of the Tagalogs was given as Batala in "Relacion de las Yslas Filipinas" (1582) by Miguel de Loarca, Bathala mei capal in "Relación de las Islas Filipinas" (1595–1602) by Pedro Chirino, Badhala in "Relacion de las Costumbres de Los Tagalos" (1589) by Juan de Plasencia, Bachtala napal nanca calgna salahat (Bathalà na kumapál at nangangalagà sa lahát – God the creator and preserver of all things), Mulayri, Molaiari, Molayare, and Dioata in the Boxer Codex (1590), Anatala and Ang Maygawâ in "Carta sobre la idolatria de los naturales de la provincia de Zambales, y de los del pueblo de Santo Tomas y otros circunvecinos" (1686–1688) by Felipe Pardo, O.P., and Bathala mei Capal and Diuata in "The history of Sumatra: containing an account of the government, laws, customs and manners of the native inhabitants, with a description of the natural productions, and a relation of the ancient political state of that island." (1784) by William Marsden. The true name of this deity, however, is actually unknown, and the ancient Tagalogs usually referred to and addressed him under several titles and epithets.

Jose Rizal, in his letter to his friend Ferdinand Blumentritt (17 April 1890), wrote that the word Bathala was an error of Chirino or some missionary older than or ahead of him who had been copied by subsequent historians, because, according to him, the majority of the historians of the Philippines were mere copyists. He believed that the phrase Bathalà/Maykapál that was adopted by other historians after Chirino was nothing more than the phrase Bahala ang Maykapal wrongly written; that is, equivalent to Alla or Alah of the Muslims or to the Malayan Tuan Alla punia Kraja. This is because Bahalà ang May Kapál means "God will take care", a meaning given also in a dictionary to the phrase Bathalà May Kapal. The fact that the phrase Bathalà May Kapál was so often encountered made Rizal presume that it may only have been a copy, and that another source where the word Bathala was used without the denomination May Kapál could not be found. Rizal believed that the Tagalogs never pronounced the name of their God, just as they did not pronounce the names of their parents, especially before strangers whom they considered their greatest enemies. He believed that they only called him Maykapál, a designation still used and understood by most Tagalogs today. He also pointed out that there was no trace at all of the name Bathalà among the Tagalogs in the local towns despite the fact that they used words such as Tikbalang, Asuang, Anito, Nunò, Tiyanak, etc. and retained many pagan usages, traditions, legends, and stories. He believed that the old missionaries did not take much interest in getting to know the religion of the Tagalogs. On account of their religious zeal, the missionaries considered the Tagalogs' religion unworthy and diabolical, and as a result, they never undertook a thorough investigation of it.

For Isabelo de los Reyes, the name of the Tagalog supreme god was Maykapal or Lumikhâ, and hence they called their sacred images likhâ and not Badhala, since the latter was not a specific name, but a common treatment of deities, ominous beings, and other fabulous beings that they feared. Thus, there was Badhala Maykapal (Lord Maker), Badhala Katutubo (Conborn Lord Anito), and Badhala Tigmamanok, or Blue Bird, which actually referred to the kásay-kásay (Kingfisher). Their names were Badhala, like comets, not because they were gods, but because they were ominous. The word was pronounced Badhala and not Bathalà, as an enlightened Tagalog elder told de los Reyes, and this was confirmed by Fr. Noceda in his old Dictionario Tagalog (1754). Also, according to Fr. Noceda, the term Bathalà, or Badhala, was only used among Tagalogs who had connections with Malay Hindus or Mohammedans, i.e. those from Manila to the South. Moreover, the Tagalogs did not remember the word Bathala, Batala, or Badhala until it was popularized again by Filipinos when they learned from lightly written chronicles that the indigenous Tagalog God was called Bathalà.

== Other names, titles and epithets ==
1. Mulayari (Boxer Codex: Mulayri [42r], Molaiari [59r], Molayare [62r]) – In the transcription and translation of the Boxer Codex (1590) by George Bryan Souza and Jeffrey Scott Turley (2015), the word May-ari ("Owner" or "Owner of Property") is used instead of the original spelling Mulayri. The footnote explains: "Q&G, 419, gloss this Tagalog term as "an indirect appellation of God"". According to the author Jean-Paul G. Potet (Ancient Beliefs and Customs of the Tagalogs, 2018) "Its compounds are mula "origin" and yari "power", therefore it means "Source of Power". The absence of linker between the two components, as in Malay, points at the Bruneian period for the time when it was coined". The word yari also means "made, finished or complete, etc." Thus, the meaning of Mulayari is also similar to that of Mulajadi ("Beginning of Becoming"), which is the name of the creator deity of the Batak people of Indonesia. The Tagalog and Malay word mula is derived from Sanskrit mula, meaning "root", while the Malay word jadi and its Tagalog equivalent yari are descended from the Sanskrit word jati (birth), and both words can mean "finished" or completed regarding something made or created (becoming/being). Another possible origin of the name Mulayari is the Malayalam word mulayari which means "bamboo seed". The name Mulayari was not entered by Spanish lexicographers in the old Tagalog dictionaries.

2. Diwatà (Dioata, Diuata) - Derived from Sanskrit deva and devata, which mean “deity”. Like Mulayari, Spanish lexicographers did not enter this name in early Tagalog dictionaries. In Richard E. Elkin's Manobo-English Dictionary (1968), diwatà specifically refers to the highest supreme being. In Bla'an mythology, Diwatà is one of the four primordial beings. According to some Bla'ans, Diwatà and Melu (the Creator) were brothers, and because Diwatà was older than Melu, Christian Bible translators chose Diwatà to refer to the Christian God. Among the Tagbanwa people, Diwatà is another name for the supreme deity Mangindusa. In the Kaharingan religion of Borneo, the supreme god Hatala (represented as a hornbill Tingang) gave his reflection on the primeval waters the name Jata (represented as a watersnake Tambon). In unity, they were known as Jatatala which was considered a male deity as a whole. However, Jata represented the Underworld, the Earth, and the feminine aspect of God, while Hatala represented the Upperworld, the Sun, and the masculine aspect of God. The name "Jata" is derived from the Sanskrit deva and devata [Wilken (1912, vol. III)]. "Jata" as a collective designation refers to a category of spirits inhabiting the Underworld. With the ancient Visayans, diwata was the equivalent of the Tagalog anito (ancestral spirit). According to Rev. Pablo Pastells, S.J., the interpretation of the word Bathala as 'Son of God' is confirmed by the Visayan word Diuata: "we always find here the same idea signified in the words Diwa and uata differing only in their transposition.... In closing, we may note that Dewa in Malay, Déwa in Javanese, Sunda, Makasar, and Day[ak?], Deva in Maguindanao, and Djebata in Bornean, signify 'the supreme God,’ or 'Divinity." In the Tagalog language, diwa means "spirit, thought, idea, central point, sense". According to Demetrio, Cordero-Fernando, and Nakpil Zialcita, the Tagalogs and Kapampangans of Luzon used the word "anito" instead of the word "diwata", which was more predominant in the Visayan regions. This indicated that those peoples of Luzon were less influenced by the Hindu and Buddhist beliefs of the Madjapahit empire than the Visayans were. In modern Tagalog, diwata means fairy or nymph. It refers particularly to feminine nature spirits of extraordinary beauty, like Maria Makiling.

3. Maykapál (Meicapal, Meycapal) – "Owner of what has been shaped". The title or epithet Maykapal is derived from the word kapal, the basic meaning of which is "to shape earth, clay, or wax into balls". Its doublet kipil expresses the same meaning about food: "to make rice balls and eat them". This title is related to Bathala's other title Maylupa, meaning "Owner of the Earth/Land".

4. Maygawâ (Meigaua, Meygawa) – "Owner of the Work".

5. Maylupà (Meilupa, Meylupa) – “Owner of the Earth/Land". Under this title, Bathala is symbolically represented by a crow/raven (uwák), one of the birds associated with the omen of death. Fr. Francisco Colin (1663) compared Maylupà with ancient European deities such as Ceres (an agricultural deity) and Pan (a pastoral deity), which indicates that devotees of Bathala under this title were farmers and herders.

6. Magpalaylay – "the One Fond of Incantations" (‘’laylay’’ meaning “incantation”).

7. Lumikhâ – "Creator". In the Old Tagalog language, the word likhâ also referred to the statuettes of the anitos. In modern Tagalog, including Filipino, it mainly refers to and means "creation". The word likhâ was derived from the Sanskrit word lekha, which means "drawing, picture or writing". In the ancient Tagalogs’ creation myth, the first man and woman sprang forth from a bamboo, which was the most common writing material of pre-Hispanic Filipinos.

8. Anatala – A corruption of the Arabic expression ‘Allah-ta’ala which means "God, be exalted". It probably reached Tagalog through Malay or Maranao, where the Arabic expression is read "Alataala". Because the expression ended in "-a", Spanish inquisitors thought that it referred to a female deity of the Tagalogs, the superior goddess of all their deities, thus making this name a synonym of Bathala. The name of the Bornean deity Hatala, Mahatala, or Lahatala is also a corruption of the same Arabic expression [Wilken (1912, vol. III)]. However, according to Blumentritt, Mahatala or Mahatara is the contraction of Mahabatara, which means "the Great Lord". Pedro A. Paterno (1892) also referred to Anatala as Anak-Hala, which, according to him, means "Son of God".

9. Nunò (Nono) – "Grandparent" or "Ancient One", similar to Laon of the Visayans and Gugurang of the Bicolanos. This is the name used to refer to Bathala by the initiates (antiñgeros) of Anting-anting, a post-colonial esoteric belief system of the Tagalogs. The antiñgeros also refer to Nuno as Infinito Dios (Infinite God). The term nunò was also used by the ancient Tagalogs to refer to the spirits of their ancestors (i.e. anito), nature spirits (e.g. nunò sa punsô), and the crocodile/cayman/alligator (buwaya).

== Tagalismo ==
=== Ancient Tagalog idea of god ===
Excerpts from the Boxer Codex (1590):

The Moors [i.e. the Tagalogs from Manila] of the Philippines have that the world, earth, and sky, and all other things that are in them, were created and made by only one god, whom they calls in their language Bachtala, napal nanca, calgna salahat, which means "God, creator and preserver of all things", and by another name they call him Mulayri. They said that this god of theirs was in the atmosphere before there was heaven or earth or anything else, that he was ab eterno (from eternity) and not made or created by anybody from anything, and that he alone made and created all that we have mentioned simply by his own volition because he wanted to make something so beautiful as the heaven and earth, and that he made and created one man and one woman out of the earth, from whom have come and descended all the men and their generations that are in the world.

these people feared and revered a god, maker of all things, who some call him Bathala, others Molaiari, others Dioata and, although they confess this god as the maker of all things, they do not even know nor do they know when or how he did or what for, and that his dwelling place is in heaven.

Every time the chiefs eat, they put a little of everything they eat or drink in small plates on the table as an offering to the anitos and the Molayare or Batala, creator of all things.

Excerpt from Relacion de las Yslas Filipinas by Miguel de Loarca (1582):

According to the religion formerly observed by these Moros, they worshiped a deity called among them Batala, which properly means "God." They said that they adored this Batala because he was the Lord of all, and had created human beings and villages. They said that this Batala had many agents under him, whom he sent to this world to produce, in behalf of men, what is yielded here. These beings were called anitos, and each anito had a special office. Some of them were for the fields, and some for those who journey by sea; some for those who went to war, and some for diseases.

Because there were many Bornean people in Manila when the Spaniards first arrived, the Spaniards called the people of Manila Moro, the Spanish name for the Muslims of the Maghreb, Iberian Peninsula, Sicily, and Malta. It was something that the friars who arrived later on repudiated, as the religion of the people of Manila was so different from what they recognized as Islamic that they could not possibly identify it as Islam, all the more so as pigs (often called "unclean animals" by Spanish chroniclers, possibly crypto-Jews) were listed among the chief holocausts to their deities, and, other than the rooster (manok na kalakyan), no other animal was listed. There was no feast without at least one pig being killed and roasted. This pig was always a holocaust, and consuming its flesh as a group was certainly regarded as a form of communion with the deity to whom it had been sacrificed. The water buffalo (anwang), which is the greatest holocaust among Malays, was never used as such by the Tagalogs. Despite all of this, the Spaniards continued to call the people of Manila Moros for a very long time, as it served as a reason or justification for the Spaniards to seize and enslave them. The English translation of the Boxer Codex (1590) by Souza and Turley renders "Bachtala, napalnanca, calgna salahat" as "Bathala na may kapangyarihan sa lahat" which is translated into English as "God who has power over everything". The exact translation of "God, creator and preserver of all things" in Tagalog is "Bathala na kumapal at nangangalaga sa lahat".

=== Bathala and the Anitos ===
The chief deity of the Tagalas is called Bathala mei Capal, and also Diuata; and their principal idolatry consists in adoring those of their ancestors who signalised themselves for courage or abilities; calling them Humalagar, i.e. manes.

— William Marsden, The History of Sumatra (1784)

Anitería (literally meaning worship of anitos) was the term coined by some Spanish chroniclers to denote the Tagalogs' religion, as they observed that, despite the people's belief and respect to the omnipotent Bathala, they also offered sacrifices to ancestral spirits called anitos. Miguel de Loarca (Relacion de las Yslas Filipinas, 1582) asked Tagalogs why holocausts were offered to anitos and not to Bathala. The Tagalogs answered that Bathala was a great lord, and no one could speak to him directly because he lived in heaven (Kaluwálhatian), so he sent down the anitos to provide for them.

They placed their ancestors, the invocation of whom was the first thing in all their work and dangers, among these anitos.

— Francisco Colin, et al. [The Philippine Islands (1493-1898)]

The function of the anitos, therefore, was similar to that of liminal deities in polytheistic religions who serve as intermediaries between mortals and the divine, such as Agni (Hindu) and Janus (Roman) who hold the access to divine realms, hence the reason why they are invoked first and are the first to receive offerings, regardless of the deity that one wants to pray to. The anitos—just like the loa of Haitian Vodou—are not considered gods and goddesses but merely messengers, intermediaries, and advocates (abogado) of the people to the Supreme Being. This is similar in concept to Neoplatonism wherein spiritual beings called daimones carry divine things to mortals and mortal things to the Divine: requests and sacrifices from below and commandments and answers from above.

They are the assistants, the ministers of Batala, who sends them on earth to help men. These helpers are called: Anitos. The nature of the Anito is such that he comes on earth, deals with men and speaks in his behalf to Batala.

— Miguel de Loarca (1582)

Some chroniclers, such as the anonymous author of Boxer Codex, do not call these agents of Bathala anitos, but instead have referred to them as dioses, rendered in translation by Quirino and Garcia as "gods". The American-Filipino historian William Henry Scott supports the opinion of these chroniclers (some of whom might be Crypto-Jews) that the ancient Tagalogs worshipped the anitos as gods and goddesses (aniteria), arguing that "in actual prayers, they were petitioned directly, not as intermediaries". Scott cites the example of a farmer's prayer to the anito named Lakapati, where a child would be held over a field, and the farmer would pray: "Lakapati, pakanin mo yaring alipin mo; huwag mong gutumin [Lakapati feed this thy slave; let him not hunger]". However, Scott—who himself was an appointed lay missionary in the Protestant Episcopal Church in the United States of America—may be using the Protestant definition or idea of intercession and worship in contrast to that of the Catholic explorers and missionaries, who described the role of the anitos as an advocate (abogado) or intercessor. Most chronicles (and isolated descriptions by explorers and missionaries) present one supreme deity analogous to the Christian God, evoking the impression that the Tagalog religion was monotheistic. Only a few sources include the names of other deities. Also, the missionaries who described the Tagalog religion in the early modern period did emphasize (with only a few exceptions) that the Tagalogs believed in one supreme god as the creator of all things. Their intention was mainly to find an equivalent for the Christian god in order to help them explain Catholic doctrines. Mostly, the titles of their chapters on the Tagalog religion suggest that they intended to portray the religion as a "false religion" or "superstition", despite their constant wondering whether or not the "new peoples" they claimed to have discovered already had some knowledge of the Gospel.

Although Bathala can only be reached through the agency of the anitos, he is not a distant deity too mighty to be bothered with the concerns of mortal men. The early Tagalogs believed that, on the birth of every child, the god Bathala appointed a lesser spirit, whom they also called Bathala, as guardian or Bathala Catotobo (Katutubo), identified by Father Noceda as a guardian angel. The god Bathala also guided people through omens and prophetic dreams. The souls of those who perished by the sword, were devoured by crocodiles, or killed by lightning immediately would ascend to Kaluwálhatian (glory) by means of the rainbow (balangaw).

=== Rituals and ceremonies ===
Bathala is the subject of sacred songs such as Diona and Tulingdao, wherein performers invoke him to prevent flood, drought, and pests and to grant them plentiful harvest and a beautiful field. The people of Indang and Alfonso, Cavite conducted Sanghiyang rituals as an offering to Bathala for a bountiful harvest, healing, a recovery from illness, or deliverance from death. The ritual is believed to have started from Naic long before the arrival of the Spaniards and the friars led to the suppression of its observance. This ritual is always done in preparation for other rituals such as "Sayaw sa Apoy" (Fire Dancing), "Basang-Gilagid" (House Blessing), Ancestral Offering, or Mediumistic Healing. It is also performed before searching for a lost item, such as jewelry and other valuables. After it, the Magsasanghiyang dialogues with the Superpower through her Timbangan (pendulum).

Some believed that the term Sanghiyang is coined from two Tagalog words: isa (one), and hiyang (compatible), together meaning "compatible whole" ("nagkakaisang kabuuan"). It is more likely, however, that said ritual is related to the sacred Balinese dance ceremony Sanghyang, which is also the title for a deified spirit and means "The Revered One" or "Holiness". Hyang, or personified as Sang Hyang, (Kawi, Javanese, Sundanese, and Balinese) is an unseen spiritual entity that has supernatural power in ancient Nusantara mythology. This spirit can be either divine or ancestral. In modern Nusantara, this term tends to be associated with gods, which are each known as a dewata or God. Currently, the term is widely associated with Indonesian Dharmism which developed in ancient Java and Bali more than a millennium ago. However, the term actually has an older origin: it has its root in indigenous animistic and dynamistic beliefs of the Austronesian people inhabiting the Nusantara archipelago. The Hyang concept is indigenously developed in the archipelago and is not considered to have originated from Indian dharmic religions.

=== Sacred animals and omens ===
The early Tagalogs believed that Bathala revealed his will through omens by sending the bird tigmamanukin (tigmamanuquin) to which they also attributed the name Bathala. Plasencia (1589), Chirino (1604), and Colin (1663) described this bird as blue in color and as large as a thrush or turtledove. Emma Helen Blair and James Alexander Robertson identified this bird as the Philippine fairy-bluebird (Irena cyanogastra). Although the Boxer Codex described it as "reddish blue and black", Antonio de Morga spoke of the bird as "yellow colored", which was the color of beauty for the early Tagalogs and had religious significance to them. According to Morga, the bird tigmamanukin—as described by Chirino and Colin—could be either inexistent or extinct, since there is no known blue bird of the same size as a thrush; however, there is a similar yellow (though not completely so) bird called kuliawan (golden oriole). The name Bathala was also attributed to comets and other heavenly bodies which the Tagalog people believed predicted events.

Other animals that were observed for omens include the balatiti or balantikis, uwak (crow/raven), kuwago (owl), bahaw (mountain owl), butiki (lizard), malimakan snail, and the tigmamanok (white-collared kingfisher, also known as salaksak among the Ilocanos). These birds, crocodiles and lizards were so sacred to the ancient Tagalogs that killing one was considered taboo. When a crocodile died, they anointed it with sesame oil, enshrouded it in a mat and buried it. This is also reported about the tuko (gecko), a venomous lizard. San Buenaventura questioned the Tagalogs for tolerating monitor lizards (bayawak), saurians fond of eggs and chicken and therefore dangerous to poultry: "Ano’t di ninyo siluin itong bayawak?" (How is it that you haven't noosed this monitor lizard?) The while-collared kingfishers (tigmamanok) were considered very sacred because they were permitted to pick a crocodile's teeth without harm. According to Chirino (1595–1602) and Colin (1663), the ancient Tagalogs held the crocodiles in the greatest veneration, and when they saw one in the water, they cried out in all subjection "Nono" (Nuno), meaning "grandfather". They asked it pleasantly and tenderly not to harm them and, for that purpose, offered it a portion of the fish they carried in their boat by throwing it into the water. Also, the river of Manila (now called Pasig River) once had a large rock (Buayang Bato/Stone Crocodile) that served as an idol for many years. The ancient Tagalogs left offerings to it whenever they passed by until the fathers of St. Augustine broke it into small bits and set up a cross in its place. Soon, a small shrine or chapel, with an image of St. Nicolas of Tolentino, was constructed in that location.

=== Creation myth ===
From The History of Sumatra (1784) by William Marsden:

Their notions of the creation of the world, and formation of mankind, had something ridiculously extravagant. They believed that the world at first consisted only of sky and water, and between these two, a glede; which, weary with flying about, and finding no place to rest, set the water at variance with the sky, which, in order to keep it in bounds, and that it should not get uppermost, loaded the water with a number of islands, in which the glede might settle and leave them at peace. Mankind they said, sprang out of a large cane with two joints, that, floating about in the water, was at length thrown by the waves against the feet of the glede, as it stood on shore, which opened it with its bill, and the man came out of one joint, and the woman out of the other. These were soon after married by consent of their god, Bathala Meycapal, which caused the first trembling of the earth; and from thence are descended the different nations of the world.

From Philippine Folktales (1916) by Mabel Cook Cole:

When the world first began there was no land, but only the sea and the sky, and between them was a kite (a bird something like a hawk). One day the bird which had nowhere to light grew tired of flying about, so she stirred up the sea until it threw its waters against the sky. The sky, in order to restrain the sea, showered upon it many islands until it could no longer rise, but ran back and forth. Then the sky ordered the kite to light on one of the islands to build her nest, and to leave the sea and the sky in peace. Now at this time the land breeze and the sea breeze were married, and they had a child which was a bamboo. One day when this bamboo was floating about on the water, it struck the feet of the kite which was on the beach. The bird, angry that anything should strike it, pecked at the bamboo, and out of one section came a man and from the other a woman. Then the earthquake called on all the birds and fish to see what should be done with these two, and it was decided that they should marry. Many children were born to the couple, and from them came all the different races of people. After a while the parents grew very tired of having so many idle and useless children around, and they wished to be rid of them, but they knew of no place to send them to. Time went on and the children became so numerous that the parents enjoyed no peace. One day, in desperation, the father seized a stick and began beating them on all sides. This so frightened the children that they fled in different directions, seeking hidden rooms in the house—some concealed themselves in the walls, some ran outside, while others hid in the fireplace, and several fled to the sea. Now it happened that those who went into the hidden rooms of the house later became the chiefs of the islands; and those who concealed themselves in the walls became slaves. Those who ran outside were free men; and those who hid in the fireplace became negroes; while those who fled to the sea were gone many years, and when their children came back they were the white people.

These creation myths refer to what is known by theologians as a "second creation". This conception presupposes a pre-existing matter or substratum out of which the Earth was made. In Philippine mythologies, struggle between two hostile forces is a common theme in the formation of the earth; hence, the existence of the Land Breeze. It is always subsequently followed by the creation or appearance of the first man and woman in contrast to the animals that precede them. According to Andres San Nicolas (1624), the Sambal people, an ethnic group closely related to the Tagalogs, particularly those in Tanay, Rizal, "did not doubt the fact of there having been in its time a creation of man, but they believed that the first one had emerged from a bamboo joint and his wife out of another, under very ridiculous and stupid circumstances." According to William Marsden (1784), the ancient Tagalogs believed that the first man and woman were produced from a bamboo pole which burst in the island of Sumatra, and they quarreled about their marriage. A paper by Catalina Villaruz, written in about 1920 and now in the H. Otley Beyer manuscript collection, reports that the Southern Luzon Tagalogs believed that the first man started his life inside a bamboo pole. He grew, the bamboo cracked, and out he came. The same story is told of the first woman, and once out of the cane they looked at each other, fell in love, and married. A Tagalog euphemism for a child born out of wedlock is "putok sa buho" ("one who burst out of a bamboo") – an evident carryover from the times when the myth was held as gospel of truth. According to Nick Joaquin [Alamanac for Manileño (1979)] "The man wooed the woman but the woman was shy, illusive, and stubbornly coy. Becoming impatient, God [i.e. Bathala] started violent earthquake, which flung the woman into the man’s arm. Only thus were they married and the earth populated".

Francisco Colin identified the "earthquake" in the creation myth as a god. Based on the version of the creation myth provided by William Marsden (1784), the ancient Tagalogs viewed the "earthquake" as a manifestation of Bathala Maykapal. However, Pedro Chirino in his writings did not speak of the "earthquake", nor did he believe that it was considered as God, as, according to the Tagalogs and the Mandayas of Mindanao who informed him, the "earthquake" was nothing more than the effect of the movement of a huge animal in the entrails of the earth. According to some, this animal was an alligator; to others, a boar which scratched his body against the trunk of the earth. This is also the belief of the mountain people of Palawan and Camarines. San Buenaventura (1663:76) threatened his congregation with the manunungab na buwaya sa impierno (the devouring crocodile of hell). Some documented curses in old Tagalog include Kainin ka nang buaya! (May a crocodile eat you!) and Lamunin ka nang lindol! (May the earthquake swallow you up!). The low-frequency vibrations produced by male crocodiles just before bellowing, which could vibrate the ground and result in water appearing to "dance", is more likely where the ancient Tagalogs got the idea of the origin of earthquakes. In modern Tagalog mythology, earthquakes are caused by a messianic figure named Bernardo Carpio, the King of the Tagalogs, who was trapped between the boulders in the mountains of Montalban. In contrast to the gigantic subterranean crocodile, the ancient Tagalogs also believed in the existence of a gigantic celestial bird which made its nest in the clouds. It is not clear, however, whether this bird is associated with the primordial kite/glede that initiated the series of events which led to the creation of the world and humankind. According to Colin, the Tagalogs believed that the first man and woman sprang from a bamboo pole pecked by a bird they called Tigmamanokin to which they applied the name of their god Bathala.

=== Connection to Dian Masalanta ===
According to Father San Agustin, the Tirurays worshipped Linog, meaning "earthquake", who, as the god of marriage, advised the first man and woman to mate and populate the earth. Bathala Meycapal, therefore, is identified with the Tiruray's god of marriage, linking him to another Tagalog deity named Dian Masalanta. Dian Masalanta is an idol who was mentioned by Juan de Plasencia in "Relacion de las Costumbres de Los Tagalos" (1589) as the patron of lovers and procreation. Dian Masalanta is also correlated by some scholars to an unnamed Tagalog deity, referred to by the contemporary of Plasencia as Alpriapo. This deity is often misidentified as the goddess of childbirth by modern writers, despite the fact that Plasencia used the masculine patron instead of the feminine patrona (patroness). The true anito of childbirth is actually La Campinay (Lakang Pinay or Lakampinay) [Pardo inquisition report (1686–1688)], who is said to be "the first midwife in the world" [Boxer Codex (1590)].

The meaning of the name Dian Masalanta is not provided, but according to Jean-Paul G. Potet (Ancient Beliefs and Customs of the Tagalogs, 2018), the meaning could be "the blind deity" [dian "deity", ma – "adj. prefic" + salanta "blindness"]. However, the name could also mean "the blinding light" (Sun?) assuming that the original spelling of the name in Tagalog was Diyang Masalanta, from Sanskrit Dia or Diya meaning "lamp or light"/ In the Malay language, Dian means candle. Dia is also the name of the supreme god of the early Visayans according to Blumentritt, which some scholars believed was derived from Sanskrit Dyu "bright shining sky", one of the first names ever given to god, which developed into the Dewas and Diwatas of all the Malayan nations. Masalanta (devastating) comes from the root word salanta, which is listeded in the "Noceda and Sanlucar Vocabulario de la lengua Tagala (1754)" and the "San Buenaventura dictionary (1613)" as meaning "poor, needy, crippled, and blind". Generally, the words magsalanta and nasalanta, which mean "is destroyed/devastated", are used to refer to a calamity, such as a typhoon, flood, or earthquake.

Professor of Anthropology Fay-Cooper Cole identified the Mandayan supreme gods—the father and son Mansilatan (The Creator) and Batla/Badla (The Preserver/Protector)—with the Tagalog deities Dian Masalanta and Bathala/Badhala, respectively. He also noted that Todlai, the god of marriage of the Bagobo people, is sometimes addressed as Maniládan. Mansilatan, the father of Batla, is the source of the omnipotent virtue called Busao, which takes possession of the Baylans (Priestesses) and the Baganis (Warriors) while they are in a trance, making them strong and valiant above other men. In other ethnolinguistic groups of the Philippines, the term Busao refers to demons, monsters, and/or the spirit or god of calamity. In the Mandayan language, the prefix man indicates paternity, being or dominion, while the word silatan means 'east', the direction of the rising sun.

Among the ancient Tagalogs, there existed a doctrine—which, according to Chirino (1601–1604), was sown by the Devil—that a woman who did not have a lover, whether married or single, could not be saved. They said that this man, in the other world, would hasten to offer the woman his hand at the passage of a very perilous stream which had no other bridge than a very narrow beam, which was traversed to reach the repose that they call Kaluwálhatian i.e. Bathala's abode. Hence, virginity was not recognized or esteemed among them; rather, they considered it a misfortune and a humiliation. This doctrine explains why most religious ministers (catalonas) among the ancient Tagalogs were women. Some minority tribes in the Philippines who still have some priestesses serving them, such as the Mandayas, offer an explanation. They assert that, as opposed to men, women are more appealing and persuasive toward gods and evil spirits, who are mostly males. Other places in the afterlife besides Kaluwálhatian include Maca or "kasanáan ng tuwa" ("a thousand joys"), where good souls temporarily stay pending reincarnation, and "kasanáan ng hírap" ("a thousand pains"), where bad souls go. Whether or not Dian Masalanta is identified with Bathala Meycapal is impossible to know, as the former has only been mentioned—and rather briefly—in "Relacion de las Costumbres de Los Tagalos" (1589) by Juan de Plasencia.

=== Whether or not Bathala is a solar deity ===
Another possible name for Bathala, although unconfirmed, is Hari, which is the old Tagalog name for the sun ('king’ in modern Tagalog), hence the Tagalog words tanghali (noon) and halimaw (lion or tiger, an animal associated with the sun in Vedic religion). The ancient Tagalogs believed that the rainbow (balangaw) was either Bathala's bridge (balaghari) or loincloth (bahaghari). The rainbow was regarded as a divine sign, and it was considered blasphemy to point one's finger at it. The Tagalogs today still use the expression harinawa, which means "God willing" or "may God wills it". In an article written by Lorenz Lasco in Dalumat Ejournal, he cited that, in Philippine mythologies, the sky-world's own anito (deity) is the Sun which is symbolized by a bird. However, there is no evidence or documentations directly referring to or describing Bathala as a solar deity. The Hiligaynon anthropologist F. Landa Jocano mentioned Apolaki as the solar and war god of the ancient Tagalogs, who is actually the supreme god of the ancient Pangasinans, alternatively addressed by them as Anagaoley or Ama-Gaoley (Supreme Father). According to Jean-Paul G. Potet (Ancient Beliefs and Customs of the Tagalogs, 2018), no sun deity allegedly worshipped or venerated by the ancient Tagalogs was mentioned in Spanish chronicles.

== Christianity ==
The ancient Indian [Indio i.e. the Tagalogs] name for God was Bathala, to whom they attributed the creation of the world. Remnants of the old idolatry remain among the people, and the names of some of the idols are preserved. A few phrases are still retained, especially in the remoter parts, as for example, "Magpabathala ca" (Let the will of Bathala be done), and the priest have been generally willing to recognize the name as not objectionable in substitution for Dios. The Tagal word adopted for Idolatry is Pagaanito, but to the worship of images they give the term Anito.

— Sir John Bowring, A Visit to the Philippine Islands in 1858, 1859

During the conversion of the Tagalogs to Christianity, the katalonan (shamans) were condemned by Spaniard missionaries as witches and were forced to convert. Ancestral and nature spirits were demonised, sometimes conflated with Biblical demons. The dictionary of Fray Domingo de los Santos gives Bathala as the Tagalog name for God the Creator in contrast with idols, to which the dictionary gives the collective names anito and lic-ha, or statues. The friars believed that the anitos were demons who led the Tagalogs away from the worship of God, but Bathala was the exception to this as he was similar to the Christian concept of the Creator. The people learned to incorporate Catholic elements into some of their traditional rituals such as the Sanghiyang wherein the majority of the spirits invoked are presumed Christian saints. As noted by Alejandro Roces, "In Alfonso, Cavite, there is a Barrio called Marahan where there lives an exclusive sect that perform a cultic ritual known as Sanghiyang. This ritual used to be a pagan rite of ancestral worship but was later imbued with Christian connotations and biblical justification". Presently, Sanghiyang is being practiced not only as a form of ancestral worship but also as preparation for mediumistic healing and as a preliminary rite for a more colorful ritual called "Sayaw sa Apoy" (Dance on Fire). In the course of the 19th century, the term Bathala fell out of use, as it was replaced by Panginoon (Lord) and Diyos (God).

but now they never say: Bathalang Maykapal, Bathalang San Jose; if not Panginoong Diyos, Panginoong San Jose, and the Panginoon means "Lord", like Apo.

— De los Reyes' study (1909:113)

== Bathalismo ==
Bathalismo is a religious movement in the Philippines whose mythology is partly borrowed from Christianity. Bathala is a name in this movement, hence its case markers in Tagalog are si, ni, and kay. In classical Tagalog, Bathala, being a title, not a name, has the markers of common nouns – ang/ng/sa – e.g. ngunit ang Bathala’y dapat nating sundin (but God we must obey). The same rule applies to Diyos – ang Diyos/ng Diyos/sa Diyos. Regarding the word “Bathala” in Baybayin, with the characters written from top to bottom, Pedro Paterno (1915 in Pambid 2000:108) considers that the “ba” character stands for ‘’babae’’ (woman/female), the “la” character for lalaki (man/male), and the “ha” character for the rays of spiritual light beaming from heaven, or the Holy Spirit of God. According to him, this was the concept of the Holy Trinity before the arrival of Christianity in the Philippines. Paterno was a self-styled renaissance man. He was educated in philosophy and theology, and he held a doctorate in law. He also wrote several books on Filipino ethnology, including La antigua civilización tagalog, the book in which he first imagined the Bathala-baybayin connection which some people today misconstrue as a proven part of ancient Filipino spirituality. Jose Rizal, no less, wrote the following in a letter to his friend, the ethnologist Ferdinand Blumentritt:

In regard to the work of my countryman P.A. Paterno on Bathalà, I tell you, pay no attention to it; P.A. Paterno is like this: [here Rizal drew a line with a series of loops]. I can find no word for it, but only a sign like this: [more loops].

== Anting-anting ==
In Anting-anting—the post-colonial esoteric belief system and traditional occult practices of the Tagalogs—Bathala, also known as the Infinito Dios or Nuno, is identified with the magical power (bertud or galing) that resides in amulets and talismans.

It can be said that the Infinito Dios or Nuno (native Bathala of the Tagalogs) is the genius or galing of Filipinos who entered the stone or anting-anting, that even though they were not able to blossom and won because of poverty and lack of power

— Nenita Pambid, "Anting-Anting: O Kung Bakit Nagtatago sa Loob ng Bato si Bathala"

In this belief system, the Nuno or Infinito Dios is the highest God and the oldest being, from whom everything else has emanated. One such emanation is the Santisima Trinidad (Holy Trinity), to whom the Infinito Dios gave the authority to create the world and its inhabitants. Maria (who should not be confused with the Virgin Mary) or the Infinita Dios (i.e. the female aspect of the Divine) is said to be the first emanation of the Infinito Dios, who sprang forth from his mind (Holy Wisdom/Divine Logos?). The sum of all these powers are the Cinco Vocales, i.e. the five vowels of the Filipino alphabet: AEIOU. 'A' for the Infinito Dios/Nuno, 'E' for the Infinita Dios/Maria, 'I' for God the Father, 'O' for God the Son, and 'U' for God the Holy Spirit. The Cinco Vocales, also known as the fragmentation (basag) of the supreme deity, are said to be the secret names of God who gives power. The antiñgeros (initiates of anting-anting) have simplified the complexity of one god in five personas. For them, the Cinco Vocales rank as the highest deity because they are the complete composition of the five highest gods (Kadeusan). The Infinito Dios/Nuno, the Infinita Dios/Maria, and the Santisima Trinidad all share in the equality of their divinity. No one of them is more or less than any of the others. The Infinito Dios is also referred to as Animasola (Lonely Soul), Waksim (his name as a water deity), and Atardar (reflecting his warrior or protective aspect). On the other hand, the Infinita Dios is also referred to as Gumamela Celis (Flower of Heaven), Rosa Mundi (Flower of the World), and Dios Ina (God the Mother); she is also identified with the concept of Inang Pilipinas (Mother Philippines) or Inang Bayan (Motherland) celebrated in the writings of the revolutionary Andres Bonifacio (Tapunan ng Lingap; Katapusang Hibik ng Pilipinas). Although it is widely believed that this esoteric belief system preceded Spanish colonization and Catholicism, the Tagalog term antíng-antíng (talisman) was not recorded by lexicographers until the second half of the 19th century. The same can be said of its synonyms: agímat, búti, dúpil, and galíng (Laktaw 1914:236: dúpil).

=== The theogony of the Infinito Dios ===
In the beginning, there was a bright light that covered the entire universe. This light was called the Infinito Dios. There is considered to be no God other than the Infinito Dios. He was the Animasola (Lonely Soul), a winged eye wrapped in a shawl, forever changing his form while floating in space. Soon, the Infinito Dios decided to create the world. He pulled away the light in order to give way to the darkness. His light receded until it became a small ball of light. The ball of light suddenly had a gash on its lower portion that became a mouth. On top of the mouth, a line appeared that became a nose. On top of the nose emerged two holes that became eyes. From these eyes came forth bursts of flame. Parallel to the eyes, on the sides of the ball of light, two holes appeared that became ears. In short, the Infinito Dios, once a ball of light, became a figure resembling a man's head.

Before the Infinito Dios created the universe, he decided to have someone help him in his task of creation. While thinking, five shining letters sprang forth from his mind that became the five petals of a beautiful flower (mayuming bulaklak). This flower was called the Gumamela Celis (Flower of Heaven) or Rosa Mundi (Flower of the Earth). The five letters were none other than the beautiful name M-A-R-I-A, which in the Syrian language is Miriam, which means the highest. The original name of Maria before God created the universe was Bulaklak (Flower).

The Infinito Dios decided to create other beings to assist him in his task of creation. While thinking, the Infinito Dios suddenly began perspirating on his right side. When he wiped off the perspiration, the droplets became sixteen spirits. Two of these spirits became Uph Madac and Abo Natac, the two elders who would reside in the two corners of the Earth and would become the guardians of the Sun and the Moon. The next six spirits became the beings who would reside outside the Earth. They did not want to receive any blessings from the Infinito Dios. They were named Elim, Borim, Morim, Bicairim, Persalutim, and Mitim. The next seven spirits became the unbaptized Archangels named Amaley, Alpacor, Amacor, Apalco, Alco, Araco, and Azarague. The last spirit was called Luxbel, a spirit whose name means light of heaven. He was named Becca, the being who would later rebel against the Infinito Dios. His other name was Lucifer.

Meanwhile, the Infinito Dios decided to create even more beings. While thinking, he suddenly began perspiring on his left side. Wiping the perspiration off, the droplets became eight spirit beings. Five of them became beings who would go to Jesus Christ while he was nailed to the cross to ask for his blessing; however, Jesus would expire before he could give his blessing to these five spirits. The five spirits never received their blessings and therefore retained their original names of Istac, Inatac, Islalao, Tartaraw, and Sarapao. The last three spirit beings became known as the Tres Personas, or the Santisima Trinidad. The Infinito Dios gave them the task to create the world and its inhabitants. On each of the eyes of the Tres Personas could be seen the letter M, the initial of each of their names: Magub, Mariagub, and Magugab.

=== The Infinito Dios and Bulaklak ===
Before the name Maria was used, God only called the first fruit of his thought Bulaklak (Flower). The first thing God prepared for the beginning of his creation was Impierno (Hell) or Averni, which was below and in the abyss. He said to Bulaklak: "I will leave you for a while—guard my Ark of the Covenant and do not dare to open it. If you do not obey my command, you will go down to the land that I will create and will suffer to gather the scattered and lost virtudes.' Once God had said that, he went down to the abyss to prepare a sad home for his chosen Archangels, who would be created and rebel against him. When God left, Bulaklak opened the said Ark of the Covenant in the desire to know the truth and fulfillment of God's words. When the Ark was opened, three letters "B" with wings suddenly appeared and flew away. The three letters mentioned were BAM, BAU, and BIM also known as the Tres Virtudes, which were very miraculous and wonderful. Bulaklak immediately closed the box, but the three "B"'s had been released already, and she could not find them. When God returned from the abyss, he said to Bulaklak: "Now, what I said to you will be fulfilled—that you will descend to the earth and will suffer."

God had already made a plan for and the forms of his works and creations: water, fire, earth, heaven, trees and plants, Sun, Moon, stars, and, above all, the holy spirits that would help him in his works and creations. God showed them to his consultant Bulaklak. She said that the spiritual creations were perfect, but the material things should be changed. This was because, in God's plan, the huge and tall trees were to bear large fruits, and the small and low trees were to bear tiny fruits. Bulaklak said that if those trees were to be placed on the ground, people and animals would seek shelter under the huge and tall trees when exposed to the heat of the sun, and if the large fruits of the trees were ripe and could no longer cling to the stalk and withstand the fall, they may cause injury or death to said people and animals.

God changed his plan in accordance with Bulaklak’s advice. The huge and tall trees would be the ones to bear tiny fruits, while the small and low trees would be the ones to bear large fruits. When everything was ready, God thought to create his helpers, but he was suddenly sweaty, and when he shed the sweat away on his right and left sides, the sixteen droplets of sweat on his right side became sixteen spirits, while the eight droplets of sweat on his left side became eight other spirits. From these twenty-four, he drew three to carry out his plan of creation. These were the so-called three powerful Avelator, Avetemet, and Avetillo. These were the Tres Personas, or the Santisima Trinidad, who would speak from the beginning of creation.

=== The Nuno and the Santisima Trinidad ===
The Nuno or Infinito Dios, the first and most powerful deity of all, created twenty-four holy spirits, and among them he chose three who would come to be known under the names Tres Persona Solo Dios, the Sagrada Familia, and the Santisima Trinidad. The Three were the helpers and executioners of the creative plans made by the Nuno and by Maria, or Gumamela Celis. When the Tres Persona – God the Father, God the Son, and God the Holy Spirit – talked about the things they created, suddenly the Nuno joined in and hid from the Three. The Three thought that they were the first and had the right to plan creations. They were not aware that everything was planned before they were created. The Tres Persona were deeply confused by the mysterious voice they heard and what they saw: a winged eye, a light, and an old man. As the Three chased the mysterious voice, they exchanged oraciones or words of power until they reached Heaven's gate. In this phase, the Tres Persona would be called the Sagrada Familia.

The Tres Persona did not know that they came from one God, the Nuno, that God the Father was the son of the Nuno, and that God the Son was the Nuno's grandchild. Because they did not know this, they desired to seize and baptize whom they thought was the god of the heathens in order to be saved. The chase ended when the Nuno entered the mount Bood. After a battle and an exchange of oraciones, with persuasion the Nuno agreed to be baptized, but would do so by his own power. The Nuno took out his finger from the rock of the mount Bood to be baptized, as depicted in the anting-anting of the Infinito Dios. However, it is said that, for some mysterious reason, the Nuno was not really baptized.

=== The twenty-four Ancianos ===
The twenty-four Ancianos are the holy spirits created by the Infinito Dios (from his sweat) as helpers in his works; they are identified by the antiñgeros with the Twenty-Four Elders mentioned in Revelation 11:16. The twenty-four Ancianos have been given by the Infinito Dios roles and names which wield magical powers. One of the duties of the twenty-four Ancianos is to keep track of the hours of each day: the first of them is to keep track of the time at 1 o’clock in the morning and so on in succession until the end of exactly 24 hours according to their respective numbers. They are also the observers of everything that people do or work on earth, be it right or wrong, so man's sins are not safe from the Lord because of it.

The first two elders (nuno) reside in the two corners of the Earth and are the guardians of the Sun and the Moon:

1. Uph Madac – The first spirit of the twenty-four Ancianos, responsible for guarding the first hour after midnight. She designed the Sun in accordance with a task given to her by the Infinito Dios. She made many designs and presented them to her companions and to the Lord, and they all agreed on the shape and appearance of the sun that would give light to the world from then until now and into the future.

2. Abo Natac – The second spirit, who designed the Moon, which gives us light during the night. He did so many times, and these designs were presented to his companions and to the Infinito Dios, and they agreed on the shape of the moon that is present today.

The following six spirits do not have any other office. What they do is just wander out into the world and be God's watchmen:

3. Elim – The watchman from 3:00 AM to 3:59 AM

4. Borim – The watchman from 4:00 AM to 4:59 AM

5. Morim – The watchman from 5:00 AM to 5:59 AM

6. Bicairim – The watchman from 6:00 AM to 6:59 AM

7. Persalutim – The watchman from 7:00 AM to 7:59 AM

8. Mitim – The watchman from 8:00 AM to 8:59 AM

The Siete Arkanghelis:

9. Amaley – The president and first minister of the archangel warriors. He is San Miguel Arkanghel; on his shoulders rests the fight against the wicked to have security on Earth and in heaven. San Miguel is assigned as the watchman from 9:00 AM to 9:59 AM each day; he is also the watchman on the first day of each week, which is Sunday, so he is called upon on this day to prevent any disastrous events that may occur. He is also the spirit messenger and messenger of the Infinito Dios throughout the heavens.

10. Alpacor – Made secretary of the whole universe by the Siete Arkanghelis, he is San Gabriel, who is the recorder of all the hidden wonders in the galaxy and the whole universe. San Gabriel is the watchman from 10:00 AM to 10:59 AM each day. He is also the watchman every Monday; therefore, others call upon him on this day to be saved from disasters.

11. Amacor – The prince of angelic justice and the giver of heavenly grace, for which he is also the Butler of the Infinite God. This angel is well known by the name San Rafael. He is the watchman from 11:00 AM to 11:59 AM each day and each Tuesday. He is the one to be called upon on Tuesdays for salvation from calamities.

12. Apalco – The angel who was made Justicia mayor in heaven. Chief Ruler of heavenly things and recommender to God of punishments to be inflicted, he is also the giver of wisdom to be used by the soul and earthly body of man. This angel is identified as San Uriel, who is assigned to watch at 12:00 noon, and he is also the watchman on Wednesdays, so he must be called on this day to be saved from a disaster.

13. Alco – The spirit that offers or prays to God for every good work of man, he is also the receiver and informer of human needs regarding God. This angel is San Seatiel, who is the watchman on Thursdays and at the time of the first hour of the afternoon of each day, so he is to be called upon at these times.

14. Araco – The spirit who was made the keeper of treasures and graces. He holds the key to giving the riches and glory of God. This angel is San Judiel, the benefactor and giver of God's mercy. He is also the assigned watchman on Fridays and from 2:00 PM to 2:59 PM each day, so he is to be called upon at these times.

15. Azarague – The guardian spirit of heaven and Earth and the helper and protector of all spirits under the Infinito Dios. He is San Baraquiel, the watchman at 3:00 PM of each day, and is also assigned as the watchman every Saturday, so he is the one to be called on this day. San Baraquiel is the last of the Seven Archangels, who are known as the seven warriors of God the Father.

The Rebel:

16. Luxbel – The youngest (bunso) of the 16 spirits first created by the Infinito Dios. His name means "Light of Heaven" because he is considered the closest to God. When God began his creation, he was baptized with the name Becca, but he disobeyed the Infinito Dios, so God renamed him Luxquer or Lucifer. The history of Luxbel can be found in a book entitled Diez Mundos (Ten Planets). In this book exist various types of illicit wisdom, such as hexes (kulam), glamour (malik mata), philters (gayuma) and much more. All are discouraged from having a copy of this book because it is considered the cause of the unforgivable sin against the Lord.

The following five spirits were not baptized and did not accept the Infinito Dios's calling. When the Lord Jesus Christ was hanging on the cross, they came to be baptized, but it did not turn out because at that time, the Lord Jesus died. They are:

17. Istac – The watchman from 5:00 PM to 5:59 PM.

18. Inatac – The watchman from 6:00 PM to 6:59 PM.

19. Islalao – The watchman from 7:00 PM to 7:59 PM.

20. Tartarao – The watchman from 8:00 PM to 8:59 PM.

21. Sarapao – The watchman from 9:00 PM to 9:59 PM.

The last three spirits are the Santisima Trinidad:

22. Magugab – Presents himself as Dios Ama (God the Father), who some say is the first person of the Santisima Trinidad. But as Dios Ama, he is not the Infinito Dios, but only given the right and duty to identify himself as God the Father. He was given the design of the world and all its contents, such as the various types of flying creatures in the air and those crawling on the ground, including man. He is the watchman from 9:00 PM to 9:59 PM.

23. Mariagub – The second person of the Santisima Trinidad, he has the fullness of Dios Anak (God the Son) and the power to fulfill all the mysteries wrought by the Lord Jesus Christ. He is the spirit who incarnates in order to save those who receive him and believe in him. This spirit, in every age, enters the bodies of the people commanded by God, who, in this context, is called the "Lamb of God". He is the watchman from 10:00 PM to 10:59 PM.

24. Magub – The third person of the Santisima Trinidad, as the Espiritu Santo (Holy Spirit), he acts to accomplish whatever must happen in the present. Through his power, the promises of the Infinito Dios to the people are formed and fulfilled. He is the watchman from 11:00 PM to 12:00 midnight.

== The term "Bathala" in other cultures ==
In ancient Bicol, bathala was a minor divinity, represented by a small image which Bicolanos always carried for good luck; according to the Vocabulario de la Lengua Bicol (1754) of Mark of Lisbon, "they say it was an anito that brought good luck to one it accompanied". Thus, if a man was never hit by objects thrown at him, he was said to be batalaan. According to Ferdinand Blumentritt, the ancient Bicolano bathala was a kind of guardian angel. Its counterpart in the Tagalog culture, according to Isabelo de los Reyes, was the badhala katutubo.

According to Andrés de San Nicolás (1664, 420), Bathala mey kapal was also among the deities of the Sambal people, whose false genealogies and fabulous deeds they celebrated in certain tunes and verses like hymns, which William Henry Scott wrote may have been due to the influence of the Tagalogs on the Sambal's culture and beliefs.

Diccionario Pampango del P. Beiv gaño, 1860 defines batala as "a bird to whom the Pampangos have their omens".

According to Ferdinand Blumentritt (1895), the term "bathala" among the ancient Visayans referred to the images of diwatas (gods).

=== Ancient Visayan invocation to Bathala ===
1. Bathala, origin of the first creatures,
Lives in the high mountains;
In your two hands
Resides the generator-
Maniliw, who is a witch.
Tall like the trunk
Of the coconut;
Solid like rock;
Voracious like fire;
Fierce, more than the mad perverse dog.
From your breast
The generator Lulid
Went forth.

It is he
Who does what he likes;
Who darkens
More than the night-
Like the stalk of the Palay;
And Sometimes
As if by means of rays of light,
Shoots the witches like an arrow.
Your living among the pygmies.
Destroy, oh, those bad characters
Of the generator Kamakala.

2. Bathala, thou art, oh, little bird, Adarna!
Oh thou, who art nestled in that encumbered home-
The abode of hawks and eagles,
Descend, we pray thee, to earth,
With all thy multicolored feathers
And thy silken, feathery tail-
Descend! Descend!-to earth.
Oh, thou bright-winged, little bird!
Celestial gift arth thou, prepared for the earth-
Our life's source, our mother devoted.
Verily, thou hast suffered pains in those confines
Of mountains craggy and precipitous-
Searching for lakes of emerald, now vanished.
Ferocious animals
Art thine, mother
Oh, venerable Mount Kanlaon-
The ruler of the people of the mountain.

Note: The bird Adarna is the eponymous character of a 16th-century Filipino tale in verse, "Corrido and Life Lived by the Three Princes, children of King Fernando and Queen Valeriana in the Kingdom of Berbania", which is believed by some researchers to have been based on similar European stories. The tale is also known as "The Adarna Bird".

=== Bathala invocation ===
"Bathala, source of life,"
"Creator of the first beings,"
"Dwelling in the highest heavens, in divine glory,"
"Upon His palm, the world rests,"
"The Almighty Father, the eternal spirit."

"From the peak of the coconut tree, He watches,"
"Steadfast as an unshakable mountain,"
"Blazing like a fearless fire,"
"Fierce, more ferocious"
"Than the foreign wild hound."

"He flows within our midst,"
"The Father, Lord of the spirits,"
"Deity of deities, guide of the world;"
"He is the light in the darkest night,"
"The beacon on a grim and perilous path."

=== Original Visayan invocation ===
Bathala, pinunuan sang mga
una nga mga inanak,
Dito mag estar sa mga layog
Sa anang alima na tagsa
Si amay Maniliw nga tamaw
nga,
Malayog anay sang puno ka
niug,
Mabakod angay sa bantiling,
Kag masupong angay sa
kalayo,
Mabangis labi a madal nga
Bany-aga nga ayam.
Sa amang kilid lumsit.
Si ama Lulid Amo;
Siya ang mag sumunod
Kon tunay sa boot niya,
Nga mag bulit labing
Kagab-ihon mapilong…

=== Filipino translation ===
Bathalang pinagmulan ng
Unang nilikha
Naninirahan sa kalangitan,
Sa Kanyang kamay nakasalalay
Si Ama ang espiritu na makapangyarihan.

Nakatanaw mula sa tuktok ng niyog,
Matatag tulad ng bundok,
At nag-aalab tulad ng apoy,
Mabangis, higit pa sa mabagsik
Na dayuhang asong-gubat.

Sa aming tabi siya'y dumadaloy,
Si Amay panginoon ng mga anito,diwata ng mga diwata;
Siya ang patnubay
Kung ang kanilang kalooban,
Na maging gabay sa kadiliman
Habang gabi’y bumabalot...

=== Tagalog translation ===
Bathalang pinagmulan ng
mga unang nilikha,
Nakatira ka sa kaluwalhatiaan
Sa kamay mo nakalagay
Si Maniliw, na mangkukulam
Matayog kang parang puno
ng niyog;
Matigas na parang bato,
Masiklab na parang apoy,
Mabangis na higit sa
Asong nahihibang.
Sa dibdib mo lumabas
Ang manlilikhang Lulid Amo;
Siya ang nakagagawa
At nagbibigay dilim
Na higit sa gabi…

=== Tagalog translation 2 ===
Bathala, pinagmulan ng buhay,
Lumikha sa unang nilalang,
Nananahan sa kaitaasan, kaluwalhatian,
Sa Kanyang palad nakapatong ang daigdig,
Si Amang espiritung makapangyarihan.

Mula sa tuktok ng niyog Siya'y tumatanaw,
Matibay tulad ng bundok na di matitinag,
Nag-aalab gaya ng apoy na matapang,
Mabangis, higit pa sa mabagsik
Na dayuhang asong-gubat.

Sa aming piling Siya’y dumadaloy,
Si Amang panginoon ng mga anito,
diwata ng mga diwata, gabay ng mundo;
Siya ang tanglaw sa gabing madilim,''
Ang patnubay sa landas na malagim.

=== Bicolano translation ===
Bathalang pinagmulan kan
Unang ginibo,
Naghihingowa sa kamurayan,
Sa saiyang kamot nakasandig
Si Gugurang, espiritung makusog.

Naghihiling hale sa tuktok kan niyog,
Matibay pareho sa bukid,
Asin nag-aalanggag pareho sa kalayo,
Mabangis, mas marahay sa mabangis
Na dayong ayam.

Sa samuyang tabi siya nag-aagos,
Si Gugurang, agalon kan mga anito,
Diwata nin mga diwata;
Siya an giya
Kun sainda kalooban,
Na magin patnubay sa kasupogan
Habang gab-i nagtatakop...
