= Tigmamanukan =

Philippine mythical creature

Creature information
- Grouping: Omen/mythological bird

Origin
- Region: Philippines

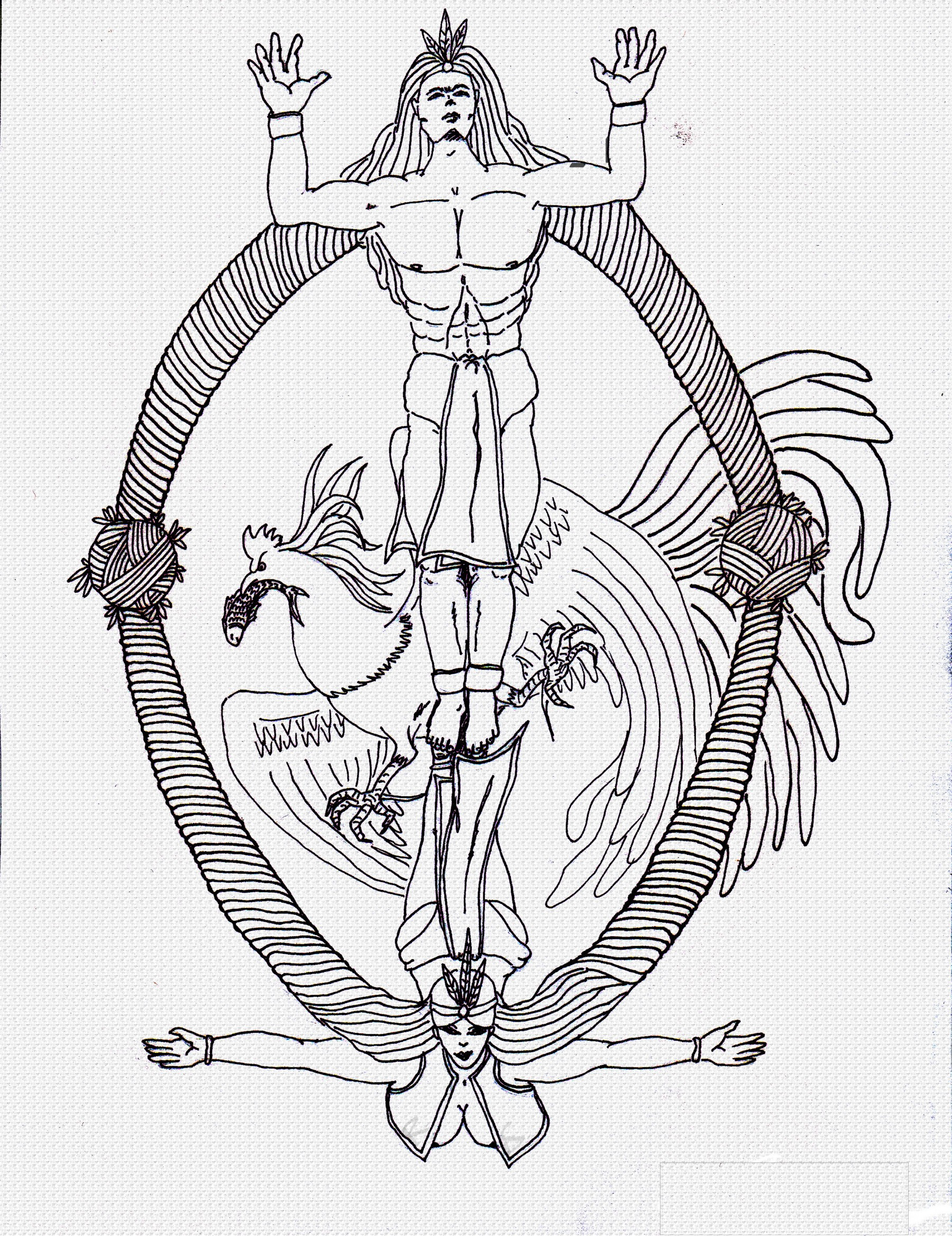
A sacred symbol of Bathala, depicting him in the middle with an anito guardian underneath him and a tigmamanukan omen bird behind him. The non-traditional image is influenced by modernity as the tigmamanukan is wrongfully portrayed as a sarimanok from Mindanao.

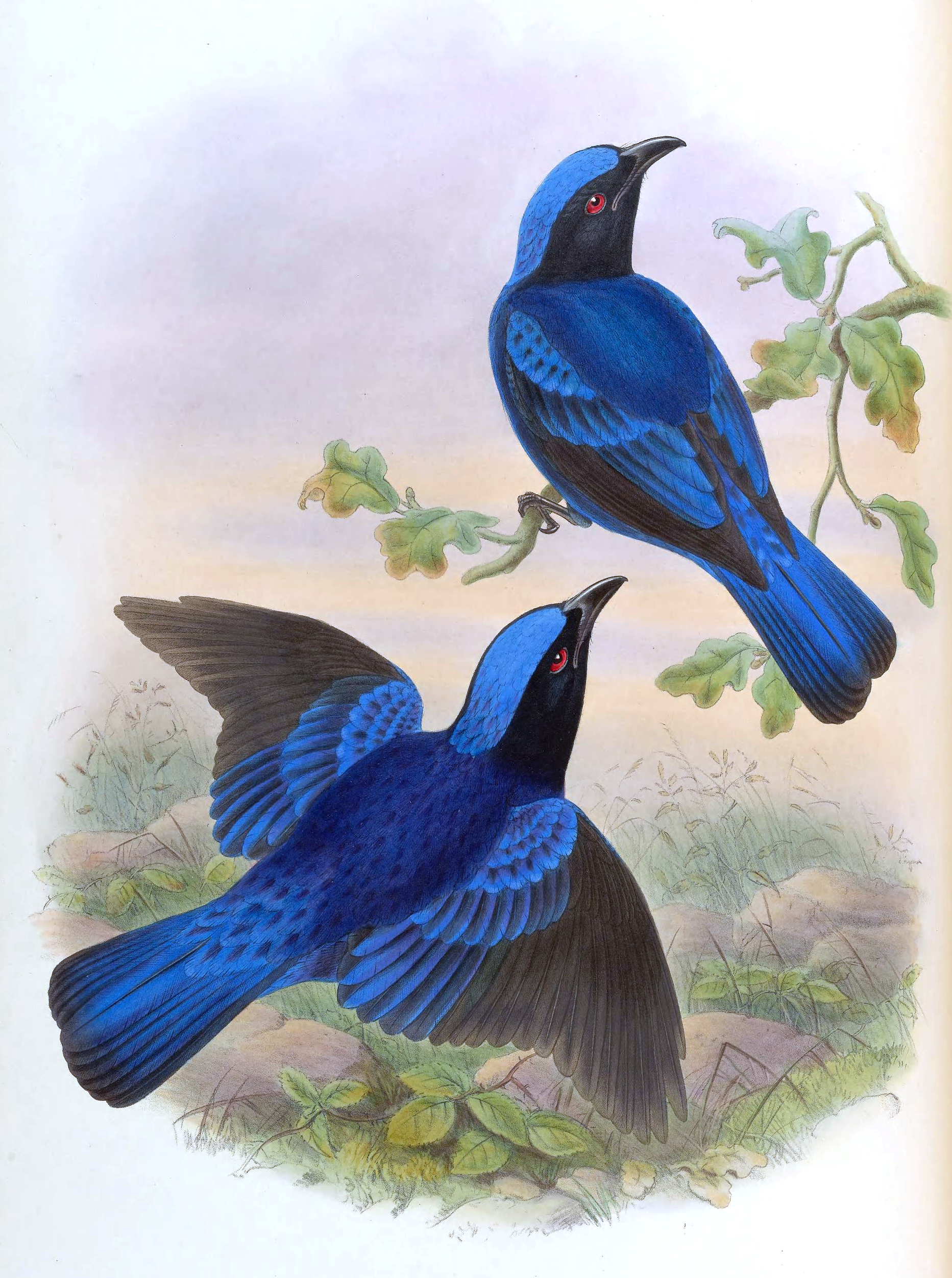
Fairy bluebirds are believed to be the specific species Tagalogs called the tigmamanukan.

In Philippine mythology, the Tigmamanukan was believed by the Tagalog people to be an omen or augural bird. Although numerous other birds and lizards were observed for possible omens, particular attention was paid to the tigmamanukan. Before Christianisation, the Tagalogs believed the tigmamanukan was sent by the supreme deity and creator god Bathala as an oracle to mankind concerning whether or not they should proceed on a journey. In some Philippine creation myths, the tigmamanukan bird was sent by Bathala to split open the primordial bamboo whence the first man and woman came out.

== Etymology ==
The root of the word tigmamanukan is manók (from Proto-Austronesian *manuk), which in modern Filipino is exclusively used for the chicken (Gallus gallus domesticus). Before Christianisation, as documented by Spanish accounts early in the colonial period, the word tigmamanukan was widely used for "any bird, lizard or snake that crossed one's path as an omen". Such encounters were called salúbong ("meeting", "encounter"). The term most likely evolved from divination practises, i.e., reading omens following the ritual sacrifice of chickens and sometimes other animals like pigs. Ancient Filipino priestesses or shamans would butcher a chicken, dissect it, and read its entrails for omens, linking augury to the word for chicken. The word manók (initially written as manuc, etc.) was also translated in several early Spanish-Tagalog dictionaries (e.g. de los Santos, 1703) as a term for the shamans as augurs themselves (Spanish: aguero).

== Omen ==
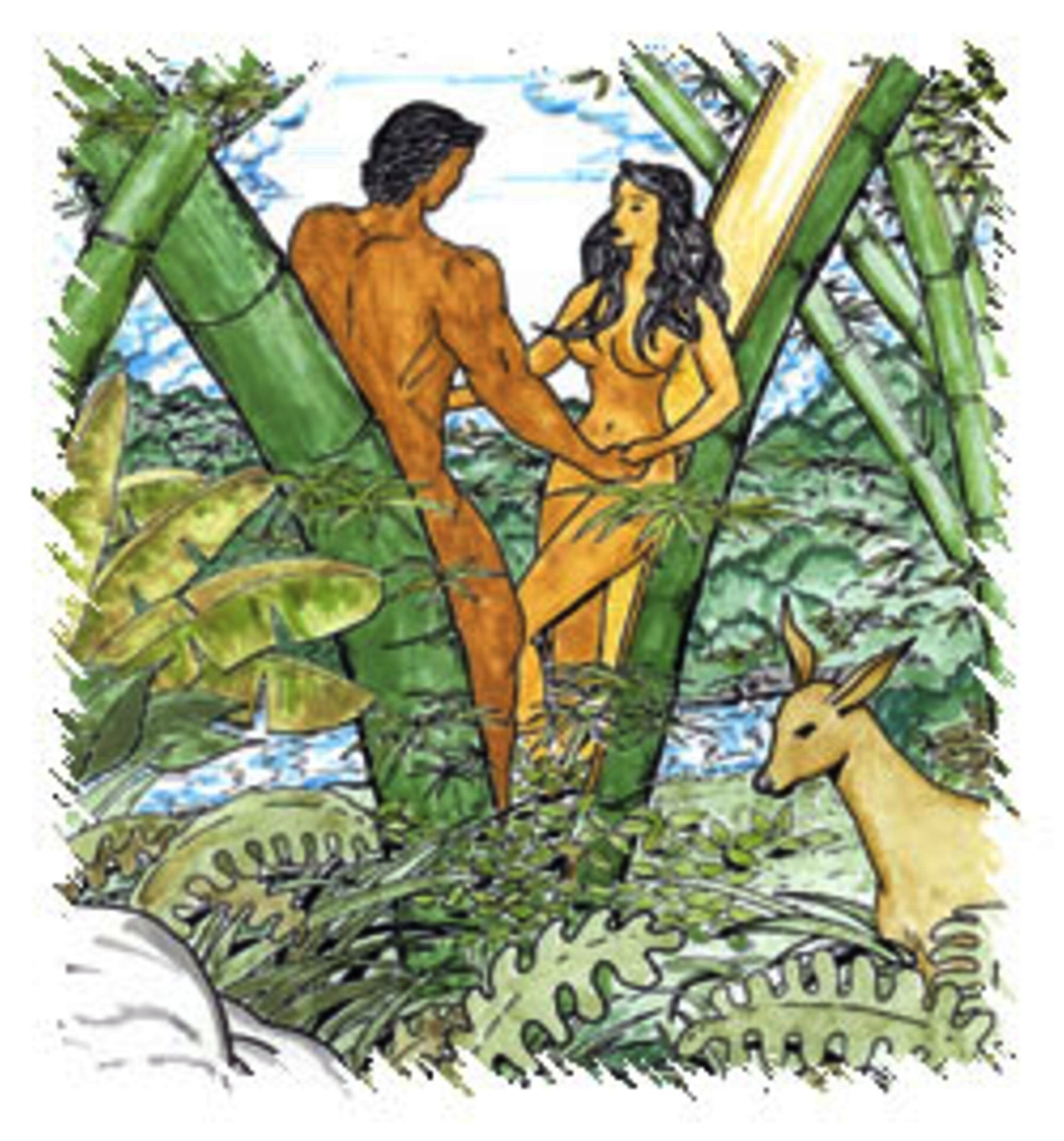
Some stories say the Tigmamanukan pecked open the bamboo shoot that contained the first man and woman.

According to San Buenaventura's 1613 Dictionary of the Tagalog Language (one of the few primary written sources for Philippine precolonial culture), the Tagalogs believed that the direction of a tigmamanukan flying across one's path at the beginning a journey indicated the undertaking's result. If it flew to the right, the expedition would be a success. This sign was called "labay", a term still present in some Filipino languages with the meaning "proceed". If the bird flew to the left, the travelers would surely never return.

It was also said that if a hunter caught a tigmamanukan in a trap, they would cut its beak and release it, saying "Kita ay iwawala, kung ako'y mey kakaunan, lalabay ka." ("You are free, so when I set forth, sing on the right.")

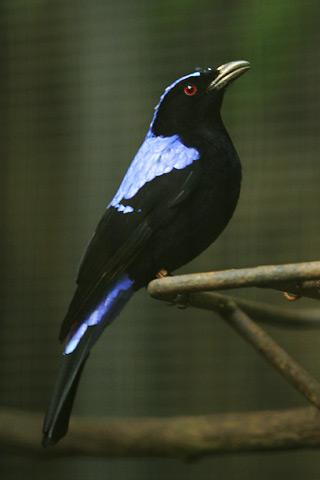
The Asian fairy bluebird (Irena puella turcosa) is one of two species that have been suggested to be the actual bird referred to by the ancient Tagalogs as the tigmamanukan.

== In mythology ==
In at least one telling of the Filipino creation myth, the Tigmamanukan was responsible for opening the bamboo from which emerged the first man, Malakas, and first woman, Maganda. It is said that the specific tigmamanukan that pecked the bamboo was named by Bathala as Manaul, however, in other sources, it was the bird form of Amihan, the deity of peace and wind, that pecked the bamboo. Some sources also state that Amihan's bird form is Manaul.

== Possible species ==
While the name "tigmamanukan" is no longer used today, some early western explorers say that the specific bird referred to by the name is a fairy bluebird (genus Irena and family Irenidae). One explorer specifically identified the Asian fairy bluebird (Irena puella turcosa) while another specifically identified the Philippine fairy bluebird (Irena cyanogastra). In any case, most of the sources which describe the tigmamanukan agree that it is distinguished by a "blue" color. In a study confirmed by the IUCN in 2017, it noted that the Philippines has two Irena species: the Philippine fairy-bluebird (Irena cyanogastra), found in the Luzon and Mindanao faunal regions; and the Palawan fairy-bluebird (Irena tweeddalii), which lives in the Palawan faunal region and was confirmed to be a separate species from the Asian fairy-bluebird (Irena puella) in 2017. The Visayas faunal region and Mindoro faunal region are not known to have populations of any Irena species.

== Historical accounts ==
"They were, moreover, very liable to find auguries in things they witnessed. For example, if they left their house and met on the way a serpent or rat, or a bird called Tigmamanuguin which was singing in the tree, or if they chanced upon anyone who sneezed, they returned at once to their house, considering the incident as an augury that some evil might befall them if they should continue their journey—especially when the above-mentioned bird sang. This song had two different forms: in the one case it was considered as an evil omen; in the other, as a good omen, and then they continued their journey. They also practiced divination, to see whether weapons, such as a dagger or knife, were to be useful and lucky for their possessor whenever occasion should offer."

Fr. Juan de Plasencia, Customs of the Tagalogs (1589)

"The Tagalos adored a blue bird, as large as a thrush, and called it Bathala, which was among them a term of divinity."

Fr. Pedro Chirino, Relacion de las Islas Filipinas (1604)

"The Tagálogs worshiped a blue bird as large as a turtle-dove, which they called tigmamanuquin, to which they attributed the name of Bathala, which, as above stated, was among them a name for divinity."

Fr. Francisco Colin, Labor Evangelica (1663)

"The Tagálogs adored now Tigmamanoquìn, which was a blue bird of the size of a turtledove..."

Fr. San Antonio, Cronicas, (1738-44)

== Other omen birds of the Philippine archipelago ==
There were myriads of species considered "omen birds" in ancient Philippines. Many of them share a characteristic: blue plumage. In Mindanao, a dove called a Limokon was similarly believed by the Mandaya, Bagobo, and Manobo to be an omen bird. A bird in Luzon was called balatiti or balantikis whose songs were listened to for signs and omens. Another, omen bird known among the hinterlands of the Tagalog region was the salaksak. Another kingfisher species was also called tigmamanukan. These birds were considered taboo to kill.

== See also ==
- Sarimanok
