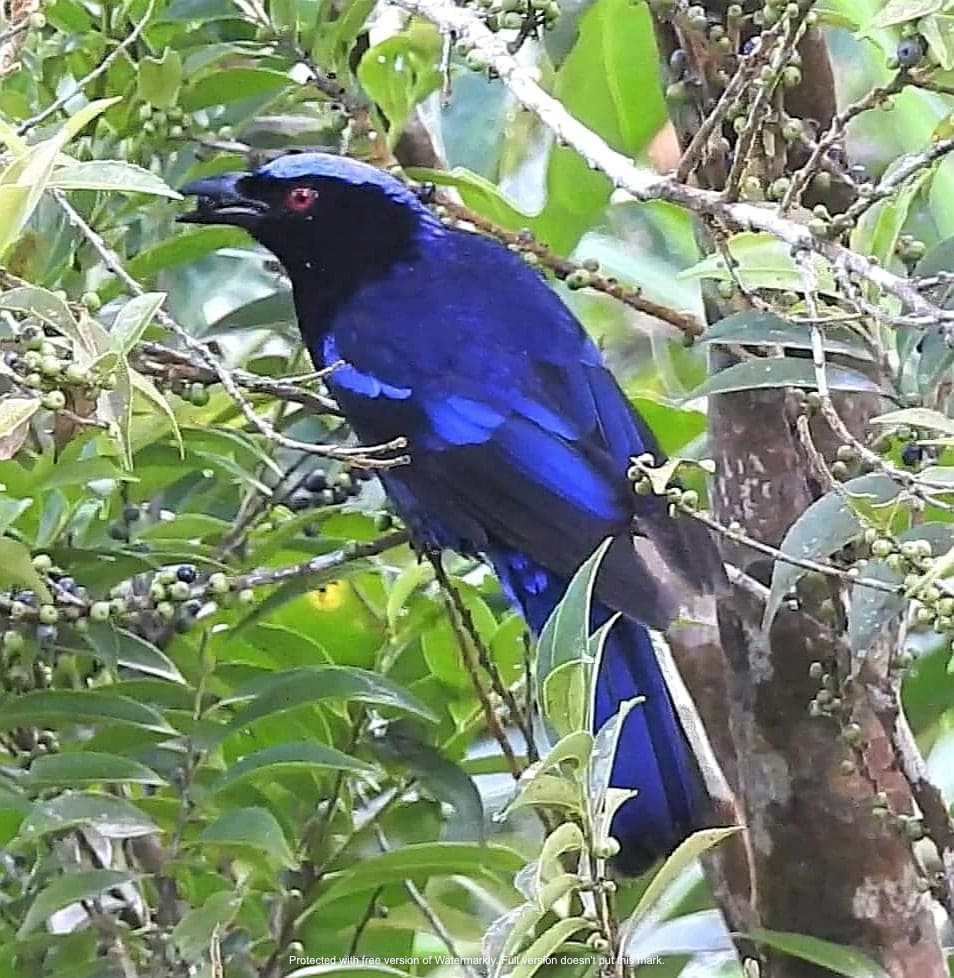

Conservation status
- Near Threatened (IUCN 3.1)

Scientific classification
- Kingdom: Animalia
- Phylum: Chordata
- Class: Aves
- Order: Passeriformes
- Family: Irenidae
- Genus: Irena
- Species: I. cyanogastra

Binomial name
- Irena cyanogastra Vigors, 1831

= Philippine fairy-bluebird =

Species of bird

The Philippine fairy-bluebird (Irena cyanogastra) is a species of bird in the family Irenidae. It is endemic to the Philippines being found in the islands of Luzon, Mindanao, Samar Leyte, and Bohol.

Its natural habitats are tropical moist lowland forest and tropical moist montane forest. They are seen in mixed flocks along with Philippine bulbuls, Blue-headed fantails and other forest birds. It is threatened by habitat loss and hunting for both food and pet trade.

== Description and taxonomy ==
Is part of the Asian fairy-bluebird species complex and was formerly conspecific with it and the Palawan fairy-bluebird but has been split due to plumage differences, voice and their genetic divergence was proven by molecular studies.

=== Subspecies ===
Four subspecies are recognized:

- I.c. cyanogastra — Found on Luzon, Polillo Islands and Catanduanes
- I.c. ellae — Found on Samar, Leyte and Bohol; has upper neck, mantle and scapulars black, chin to rear-flank level black, rectrices without brighter fringes, female indigo below breast;
- I.c. melanochlamys — Found on Mindanao, Dinagat Islands and Siargao; upperparts and tail as previous, black below only down to breast
- I.c. hoogstraali — Found on Basilan; almost identical to melanochlamys but slightly smaller

== Behaviour and ecology ==
Its diet has not yet been well recorded but found to feed on fruits. Presumed to have a similar diet as the Asian fairy-bluebird which also feeds on insects, particularly termites. Occurs singly, in small groups or with mixed-species flocks.

There is no information about its breeding habits and nesting. Birds in breeding condition found from March to May and a fledgling has been seen in August.

== Habitat and conservation status ==
Its natural habitats at tropical moist lowland primary forest and secondary forest and to the lower reaches of montane forest up to 1,500 metres (4,920 ft) above sea level.

The IUCN Red List has assessed this bird as Near-threatened species with the population still decreasing. Extensive lowland deforestation on all islands in its range is the main threat. Most remaining lowland forest that is not afforded protection leaving it vulnerable to both legal and Illegal logging, conversion into farmlands through Slash-and-burn agriculture and mining. Its preference for low altitudes suggests that it must have suffered population losses with the loss of lowland forest in the Philippines.

Occurs in a few protected areas in Northern Sierra Madre Natural Park and Bataan National Park on Luzon, Pasonanca Natural Park in Mindanao, Rajah Sikatuna Protected Landscape in Bohol and Samar Island Natural Park but actual protection and enforcement from illegal logging and hunting are lax. A sizable percentage (15%) of EBird records by birdwatchers are in the former PICOP Logging Concession in Bislig which has now faced considerable illegal logging and has no protections against encroachment and land conversion. While there is Observer bias this area still represents an important habitat for this bird.

Conservation actions proposed are further surveys to better understand distribution and population status in remaining habitat. It is also recommended that protection in existing protected areas be improved and other key habitats be formally protected.

== Relationship with humans ==
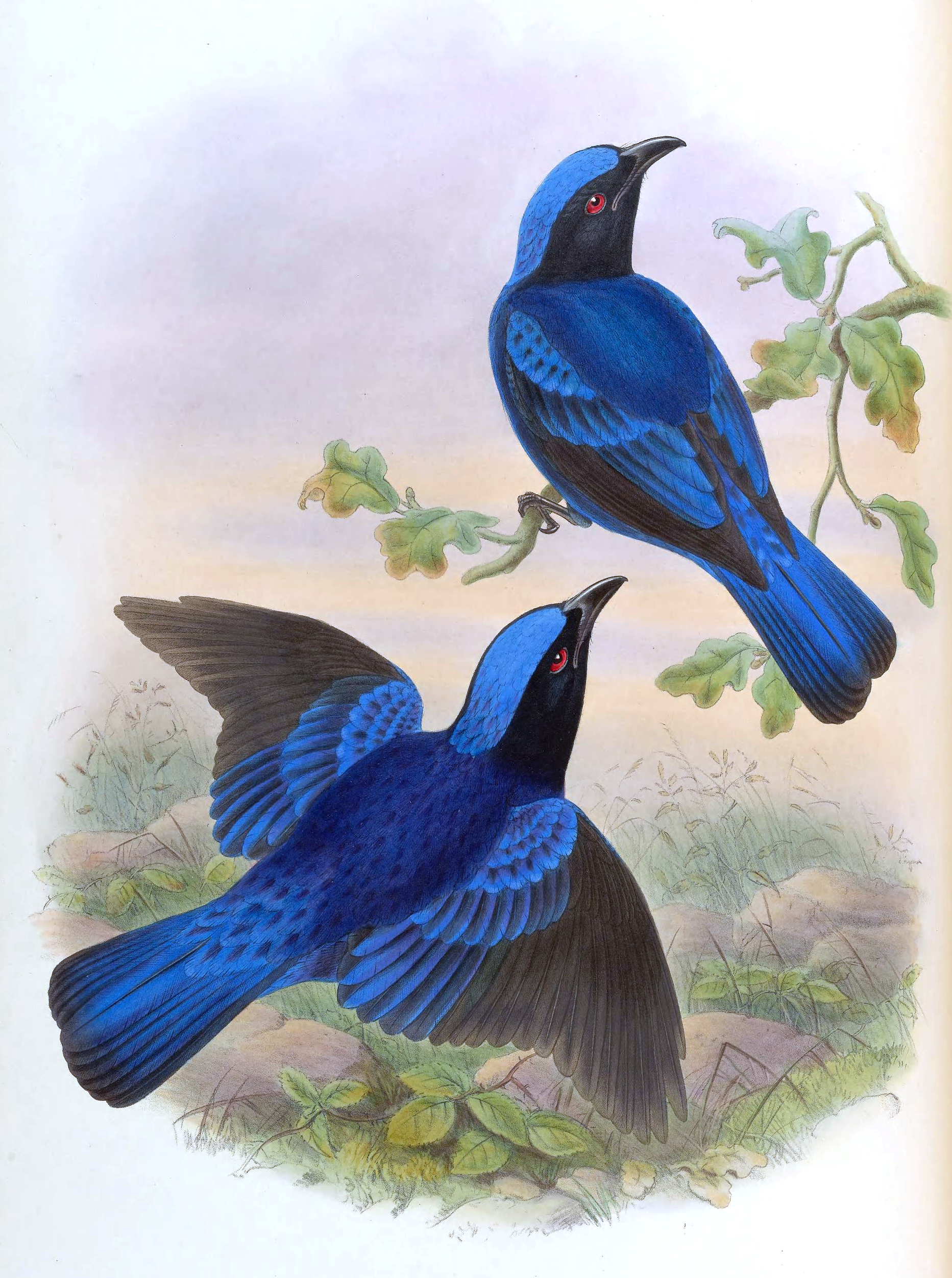
A lithograph

This species is considered as sacred to the Tagalog people as it is perceived as the tigmamanukan omen. It is believed to be a messenger of Bathala, the supreme creator god of precolonial, indigenous Tagalog religion.

In old Tagalog mythology in southern Luzon, the Philippine fairy-bluebirds were known as the tigmamanukan omen birds. According to legend, Bathala ordered a tigmamanukan bird to crack in open a bamboo stalk from which came Malakas and Maganda, the first humans.

In another legend, Bathala also sends the tigmamanukan bird (sometimes in the forms of a snake or lizard) to aid humans if they need to proceed or stop a journey. If a traveler sees a tigmamanukan omen passing from right to left, it is "labay" or divine approval to proceed with the journey. If the tigmamanukan omen passes from left to right, the traveller should not proceed, or else he or she will never return. All tigmamanukan omen birds are said to live on the mythical Mount Batala sacred to the god.

== See also ==
- Asian fairy-bluebird
- Palawan fairy-bluebird
