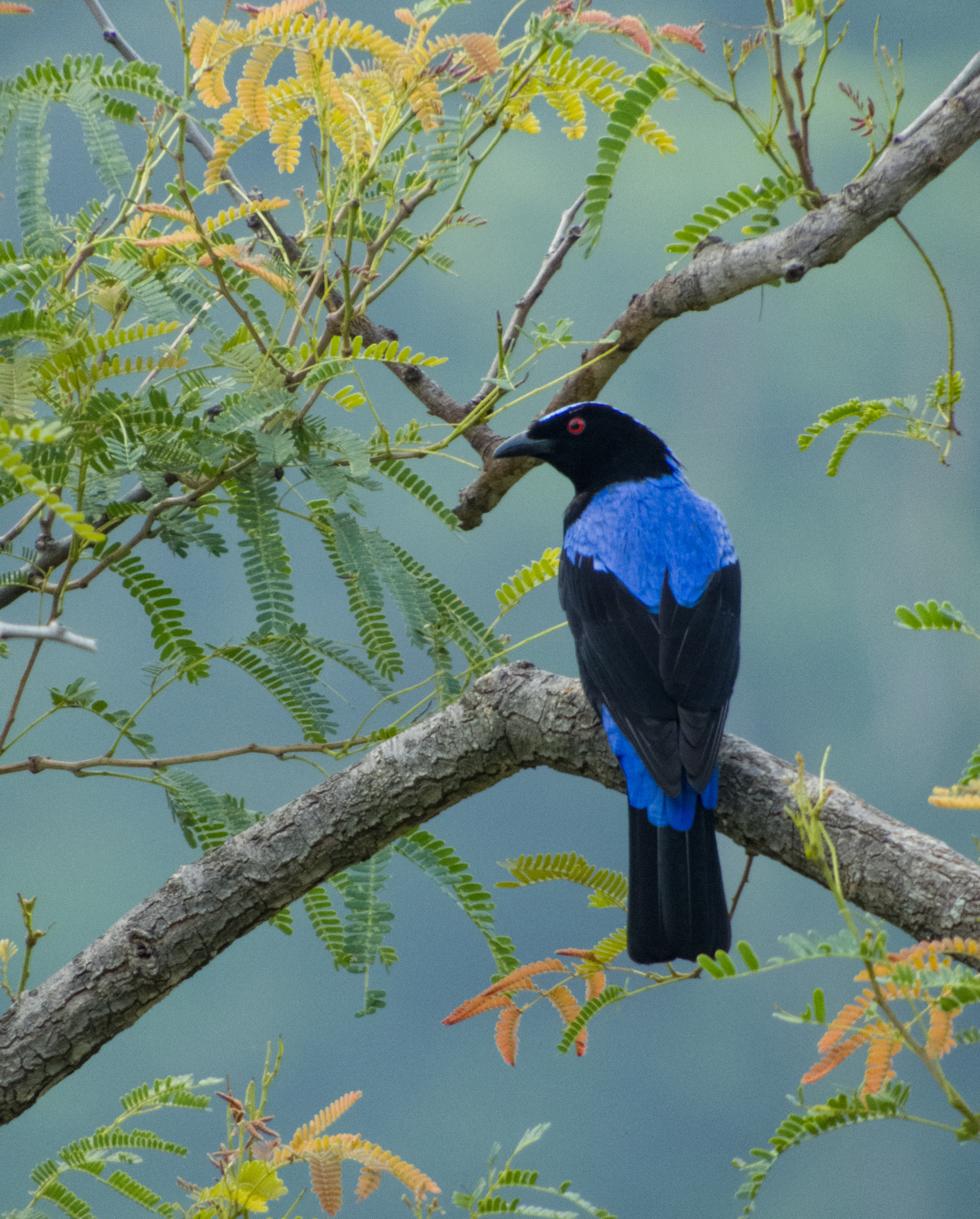
- Male in Marayoor, Kerala India
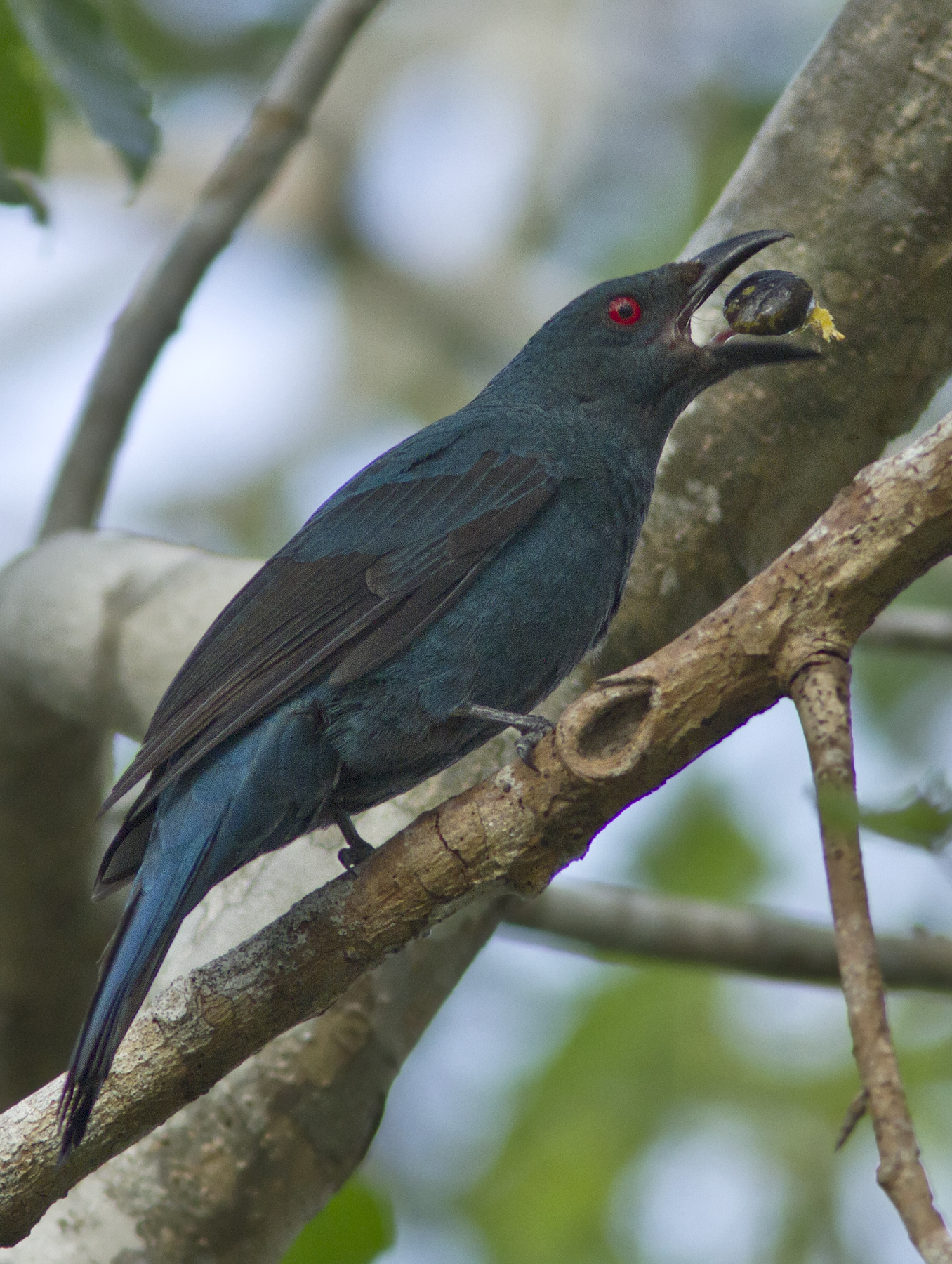
- Female in Mount Harriet National Park, Andaman and Nicobar Islands

Conservation status
- Least Concern (IUCN 3.1)

Scientific classification
- Kingdom: Animalia
- Phylum: Chordata
- Class: Aves
- Order: Passeriformes
- Family: Irenidae
- Genus: Irena
- Species: I. puella

Binomial name
- Irena puella (Latham, 1790)
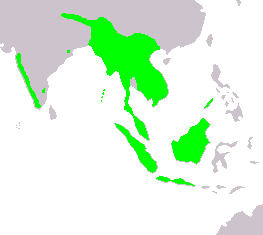
- Range includes I. tweeddalii

Synonyms
- Coracias puella

= Asian fairy-bluebird =

Species of bird

The Asian fairy-bluebird (Irena puella) is a medium-sized, arboreal passerine bird. This fairy-bluebird is found in forests across tropical southern Asia, Indochina and the Greater Sundas. Two or three eggs are laid in a small cup nest in a tree. It was described by British ornithologist John Latham in 1790. The only other member of the genus and family is the Philippine fairy-bluebird, I. cyanogastra, which replaces the Asian fairy-bluebird in most of the Philippines. Both species are considered as sacred to the Tagalog people as they are perceived as tigmamanukan omens.

The adult Asian fairy bluebird is about 24 to 27 centimetres (9.4 to 10.6 in). The male has glossy, iridescent blue upperparts, and black underparts and flight feathers. The female and first year male are entirely dull blue-green.

The Asian fairy bluebird eats fruits, nectar and some insects. Its call is a liquid two note glue-it.

== Description ==
The Asian fairy bluebird measures 24–27 cm (9.4–10.6 in) in length. The iris is crimson and eyelids pinkish; the bill, legs and claws are black, and mouth a flesh- colour. Marked sexual dimorphism is evident. The male is a shining ultramarine-blue with lilac reflections on its upper plumage, lesser wing coverts, and under tail coverts, while the sides of its head and the whole lower plumage are deep black; greater wing-coverts, quills, and tail black, and some of the coverts tipped with blue, and the middle tail-feathers glossed with blue.

The upper plumage, the lesser wing coverts, and the lower tail coverts of the female are brownish blue, with the edges of the feathers brighter. The middle tail feathers and the outer webs of all the others, except the outer pair, like the upper plumage, and remainder of tail dark brown. primaries and secondaries dark brown. The greater wing coverts, primary coverts, and tertiaries dark brown, with a blue tinge on the outer webs. Sides of the head and whole lower plumage blue, very similar to the upper parts. The young resemble the female. The male changes into adult plumage in March, the change taking place without a moult. The feathers of the upper parts first become fringed with bright blue, then the tail coverts change, and finally the lower plumage changes. Young birds with the lower plumage mixed black and dull blue, and the upper plumage like that of the adult are frequently seen.

== Distribution and habitat ==
The Asian fairy bluebird is found in Sri Lanka and the western coast of India from Travancore up to the latitude of Shivamogga, Belgaum and Sawantwadi; Sikkim and the lower ranges of the Himalayas to Dibrugarh in Assam; the Khasi Hills; Cachar; Manipur; Bangladesh; Arrakan; Bago and Taninthayi Division in Burma; the Andaman and Nicobar Islands. In southeast Asia it occurs throughout most of Indochina (including Peninsular Malaysia), Sumatra, Borneo, Java and on smaller nearby islands. In the Indian part of its range this species is confined to the evergreen forests of the hills and plains, but elsewhere it is regular in various types of humid and deciduous forests from lowlands up to about 1,600 metres (5,200 ft). The species has been reported to be more frequent in mature rainforests and in rustic cardamom plantations under native shade trees than in coffee plantations.

The subspecies known from Palawan is now thought to be a distinct species, the Palawan fairy-bluebird (I. tweeddalii).

== Behaviour and ecology ==
This bird is common in most of the tracts it frequents, going about in small parties or in pairs.

Calls (whiplash) along with some Iole indica calls

=== Breeding ===
The Asian fairy-bluebird breeds from February to April, constructing a shallow cup-shaped nest, sometimes of moss and sometimes of small twigs, in a sapling or small tree. The two eggs are greenish white marked with brown and measure about 1.14 cm × 0.77 cm (0.45 in × 0.30 in).

=== Feeding ===
It feeds principally on fruit and is generally found on the larger forest-trees.
