= Limokon =

Omen bird in Philippine mythology

In Philippine mythology, the Limokon was believed by the Mandaya, Bagobo, and Manobo people of Mindanao to be an omen bird.

In Luzon, a blue bird called the Tigmamanukan was similarly believed by the Tagalog people to be an omen bird.

In Delgado's Historia, Chap. X that deals with 'wood pigeons and turtledoves' and their names in the Visayan languages: "The fourth type [of dove] is called 'limocon' by the natives, they are a kind [ie 'appearance'] of large quail that have red feet and beak; They present very beautiful sheen formed by their green plumage on a white background". This 1897 reprint of Delgado was annotated with the bird being identified as calcophaps indica or the Common emerald dove. However, today there are various birds called 'limokon' (all are types of wild pigeons belong to Columbidae family from various genus) including White-eared brown dove. Both of these bird species have plumage of 'white streak' over their eyes (as suggested by Delgado). Likely the term 'limokon' applied to various types of wild pigeons in the various languages in the Philippines, some of which were considered 'magical' and or 'omen birds'.

== Historical accounts ==
"What they believe in thoroughly are omens, which are almost general in all the islands. There are many of them: of birds, like the limocon; of insects, like the lizard; of accidental occurrences, like sneezing; of happenings, like deaths or earthquakes; of observances at time of sowing, and of reaping, and of the hunt—all of these have their observances, which they fulfill in order to have luck in the work; for they believe that without these it will be unlucky, and without any profit. Therefore, they do not undertake those things, since in many districts it is considered an omen when anyone asks for a portion of what may be caught (as for instance, of the hunter or fisher), if we say to him when he goes to try his luck: “Divide with me what you shall catch.” They consider that as a bad omen, and return to their house, for they believe that they will catch nothing."

Fr. Francisco Combes, History of Mindanao, Sulu and Adjacent Islands (1667)

"A common method used by the spirits to communicate with mortals is through the call of the limokon. All the people know the meaning of its calls and all respect its warnings. If a man is starting to buy or trade for an article and this bird gives its warning the sale is stopped. Should the limokon call when a person is on the trail he at once doubles his fist and thrusts it in the direction from which the warning comes. If it becomes necessary to point backwards, it is a signal to return, or should the arm point directly in front it is certain that danger is there, and it is best to turn back and avoid it. When it is not clear from whence the note came, the traveler looks toward the right side. If he sees there strong, sturdy trees, he knows that all is well, but if they are cut or weaklings, he should use great care to avoid impending danger. When questioned as to why one should look only to the right, an old man quickly replied: "The right side belongs to you; the left side is bad and belongs to someone else.""

Fay Cooper Cole, The Wild Tribes of Davao District, Mindanao (1913)

"Pan-áu-ag-táu-ag to li-mó-kon. Though at the beginning of ordinary journeys the consultation of the omen bird is of primary importance, yet before a war expedition it acquires a solemnity that is not customary on ordinary occasions. This ceremony is the last of all those that are made preparatory to the march.

The warrior priest turns toward the trail and addresses the invisible turtledove, beseeching it to sing out from the proper direction and thereby declare whether they may proceed or not. In one of the instances that came under my personal observation a little unhulled rice was placed upon a log for the regalement of the omen bird, and a tame pet omen bird in an adjoining house was petted and fed and asked to summon its wild mates of the encircling forest to sing the song of victory. Many of the band imitate the turtle bird's cry as a further inducement to get an answer from the wild omen birds that might be in the neighborhood.

This is done by putting the hands crosswise, palm over palm and thumb beside thumb. The cavity between the palms must be tightly closed, leaving open a slit between the thumbs. The mouth is applied to this slit and by blowing in puffs the Manóbo can produce a sound that is natural enough to elicit in many cases response from a turtledove that may be within hearing distance. In fact, I have known the birds to approach within shooting distance of the artificial sounds."
