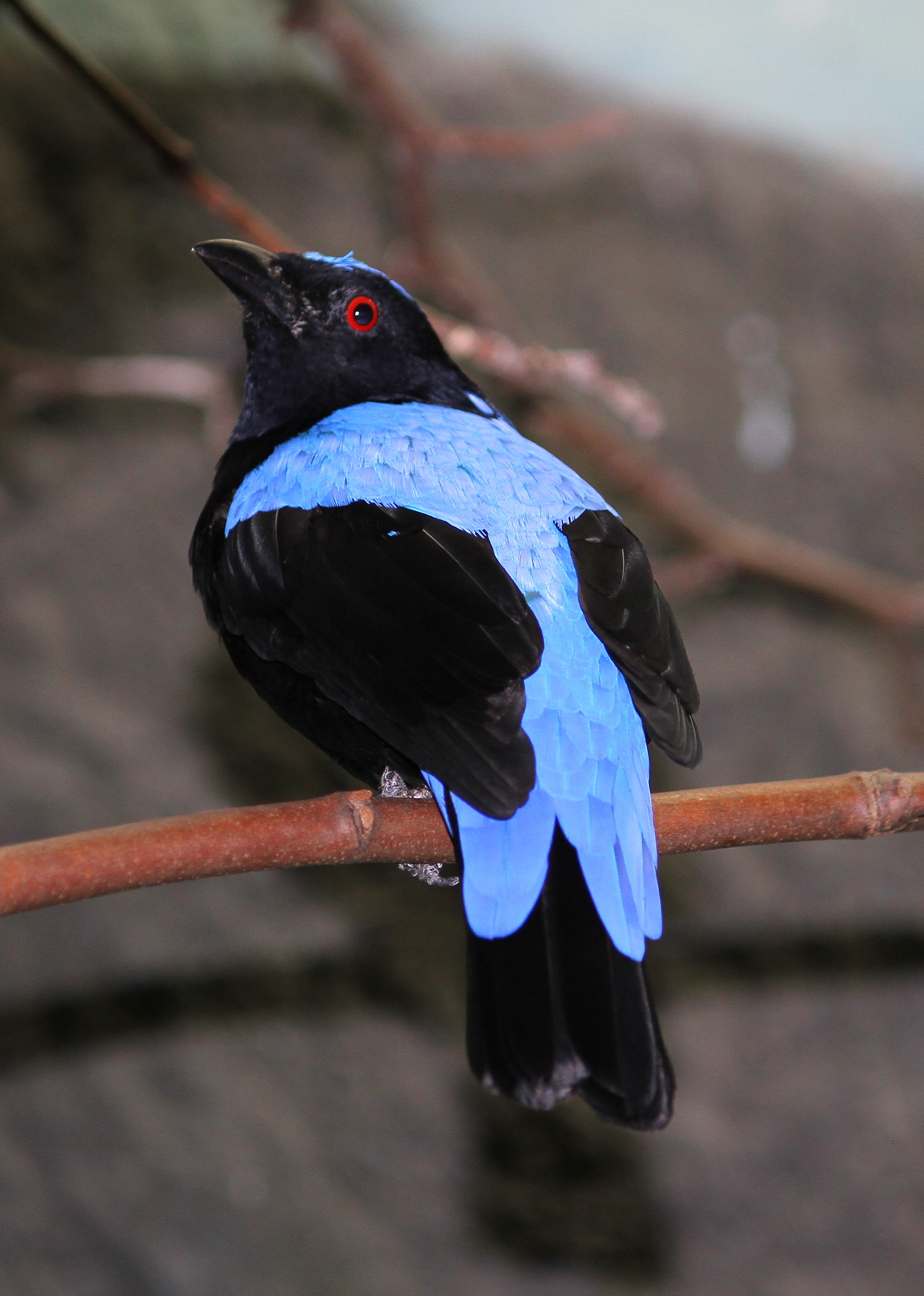
- Asian fairy-bluebird - male
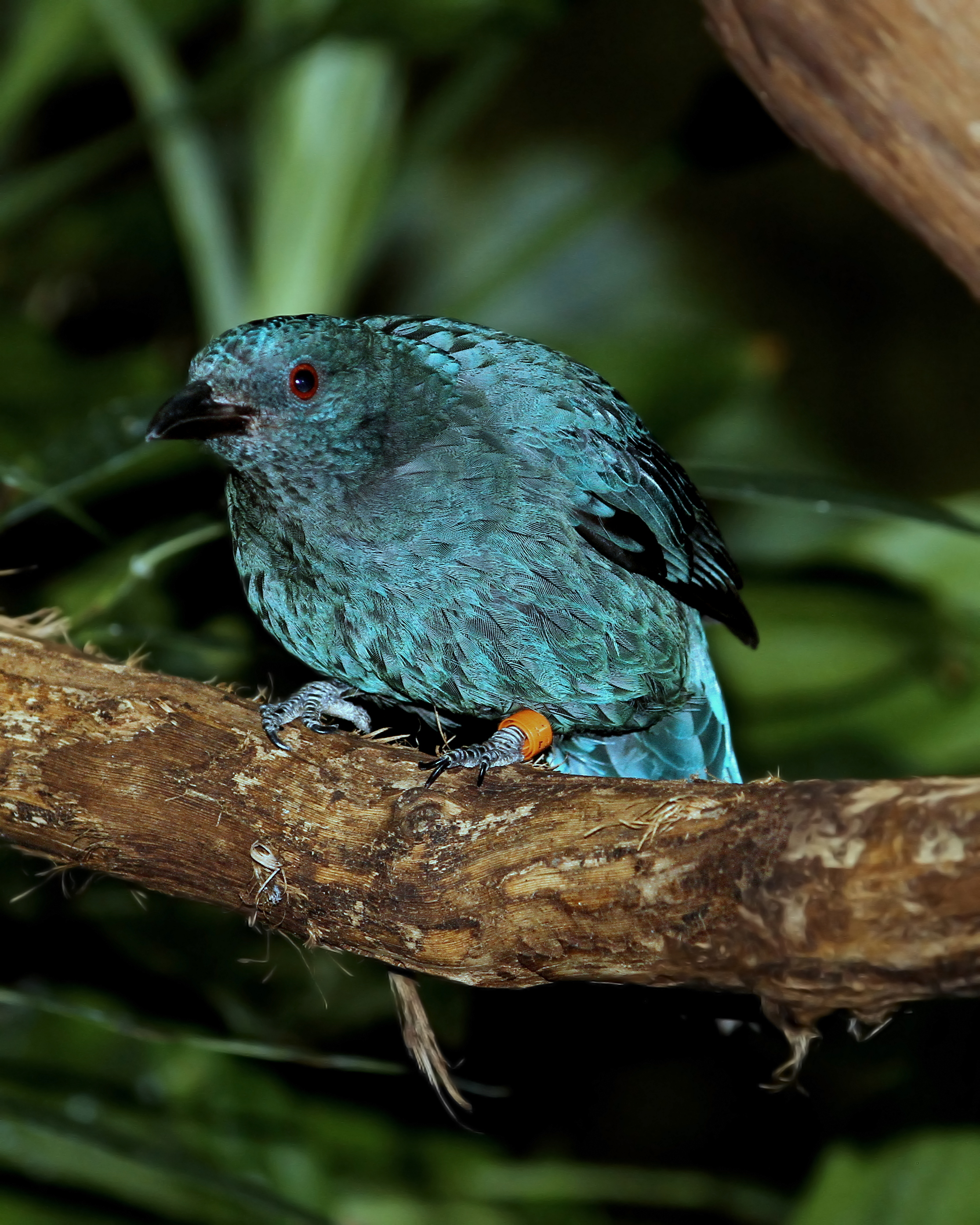
- female

Scientific classification
- Kingdom: Animalia
- Phylum: Chordata
- Class: Aves
- Order: Passeriformes
- Parvorder: Passerida
- Family: Irenidae; Jerdon, 1863
- Genus: Irena; Horsfield, 1821

Type species
- Coracias puella Latham, 1790

Species
- Irena puella; Irena tweeddalii; Irena cyanogastra
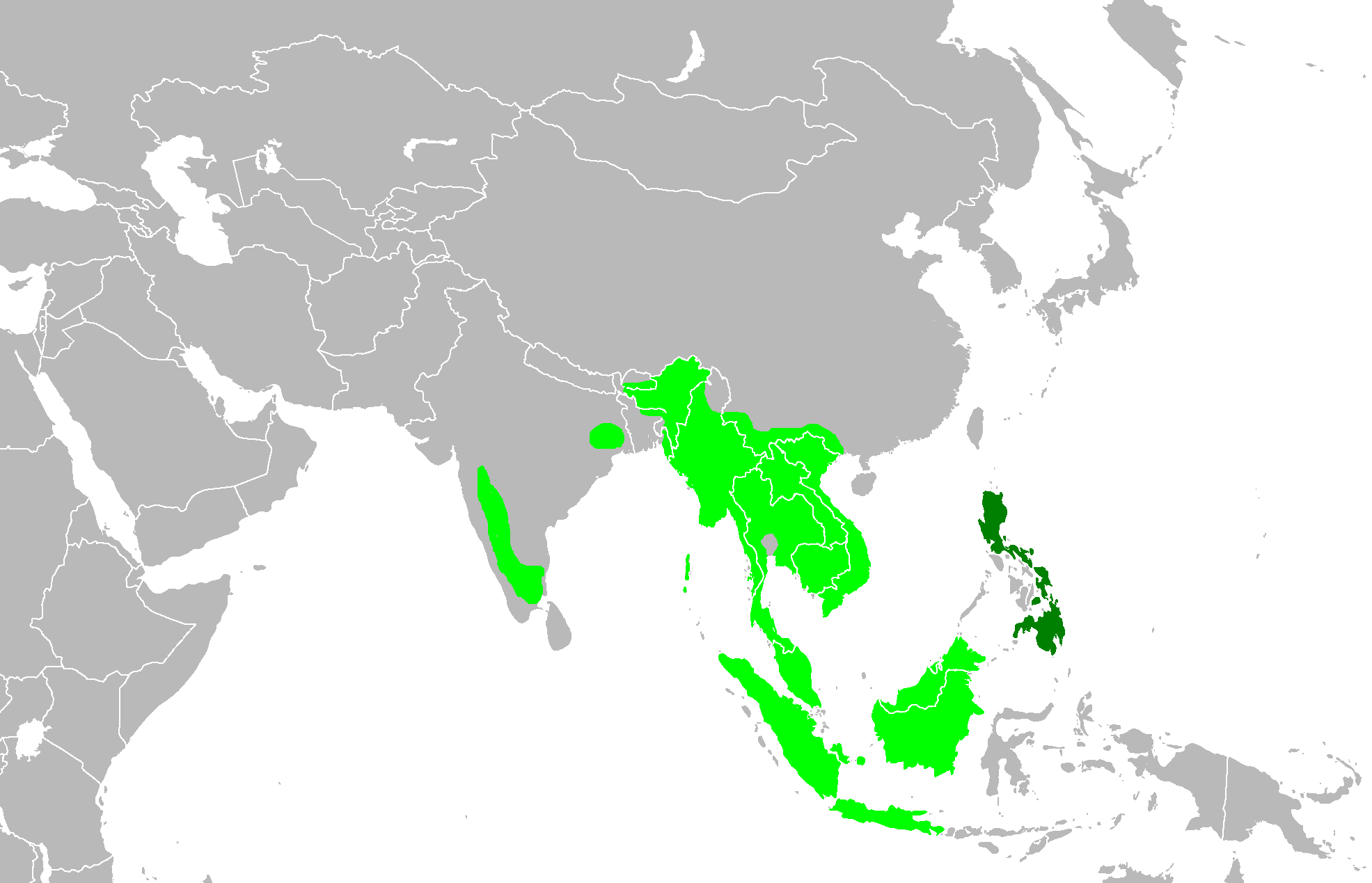
- Irena puella light green, Irena cyanogaster dark green, Irena tweeddalli not shown

= Fairy-bluebird =

Fairy-bluebirds

Genus of birds

The three fairy-bluebirds are small passerine bird species found in forests and plantations in tropical southern Asia and the Philippines. They are the sole members of the genus Irena and family Irenidae, and are related to the ioras and leafbirds.

These are bulbul-like birds of open forest or thorn scrub, but whereas that group tends to be drab in colouration, fairy-bluebirds are sexually dimorphic, with the males being dark blue in plumage, and the females duller green.

These species eat fruit, mainly figs, and possibly some insects. They lay two to three eggs in a tree nest.

The call of the Asian fairy-bluebird is a liquid two note Glue-It.

As the names suggest, the Asian fairy-bluebird (I. puella) occurs across southern Asia, the Philippine fairy-bluebird (I. cyanogastra) in that archipelago, and the Palawan fairy-bluebird (I. tweeddalii) on the island of Palawan.

== Taxonomy ==
The first scientists to examine fairy-bluebirds placed them in the genus Coracias, presumably on the strength of the iridescent blue plumage on the back. This was challenged in the 1820s by Thomas Horsfield and Coenraad Temminck, who suggested a relationship instead with the drongos. It was variously placed with the bulbuls and orioles as well. On the basis of the DNA-DNA hybridization studies of Sibley and Alhquist, its closest relatives have now been identified as the leafbirds. This relationship was confirmed by a large molecular phylogenetic study published in 2019, which found that the family Irenidae was sister to the family Chloropseidae containing the leafbirds. The leafbirds are sometimes included in the family Irenidae with the fairy-bluebirds, but the time since the apparent divergence suggests that they are better treated as separate families.

The genus contains the following three species:

Genus Irena – Horsfield, 1821 – three species
Common name	Scientific name and subspecies	Range	Size and ecology	IUCN status and estimated population
Asian fairy-bluebird Male Female	Irena puella (Latham, 1790)	Forests across tropical southern Asia (Sri Lanka, western India, Himalayan foothills, Bangladesh, Burma, Andaman and Nicobar Islands), Indochina, Peninsular Malaysia and the Greater Sundas (Sumatra, Borneo, Java)	Size: 24–27 cm (9.4–10.6 in) Habitat: Evergreen forests of hills and plains in India; elsewhere humid and deciduous forests, from lowlands up to about 1,600 m (5,200 ft) Diet: Fruit, nectar and some insects; generally found on the larger forest trees	LC
Palawan fairy-bluebird Male Female	Irena tweeddalii Sharpe, 1877	Balabac Island, Palawan and the Calamian Islands, Philippines	Size: Habitat: Tropical moist lowland primary and secondary forest, up to 1,000 m (3,300 ft) Diet: Invertebrates; diet otherwise largely unknown, presumed similar to Asian fairy-bluebird (berries, figs, nectar, some insects). Forages in the understorey, alone, in pairs or in small flocks, and joins mixed-species flocks of insectivores	NT Decreasing
Philippine fairy-bluebird	Irena cyanogastra Vigors, 1831 Four subspecies: I. c. cyanogastra: Luzon, Polillo Islands and Catanduanes; I. c. ellae: Samar, Leyte and Bohol; I. c. melanochlamys: Mindanao, Dinagat Islands and Siargao; I. c. hoogstraali: Basilan	Philippines: Luzon, Polillo Islands, Catanduanes, Samar, Leyte, Bohol, Mindanao, Dinagat Islands, Siargao, and Basilan (Dark green on map)	Size: Habitat: Tropical moist lowland primary and secondary forest, and the lower reaches of montane forest, up to 1,500 m (4,900 ft) Diet: Fruit; diet not well recorded, presumed similar to Asian fairy-bluebird (also insects, particularly termites). Occurs singly, in small groups or in mixed-species flocks	NT Decreasing

== Morphology ==
Fairy-bluebirds are robust birds that resemble Old World orioles in shape and size. Males are larger than females. They weigh between 50 and 100g, with some of that variation being caused by sexual differences and some by geographic variation. There are clines in size differences, which can be attributed to Bergmann's rule, with the northernmost populations being larger on average. They have a powerful deep and notched bill used for crushing, with that of the Philippine species being largest. Their feet are small, which suggests that they spend less time climbing in order to feed and more time on the wing.

The plumage of the fairy-bluebirds is exceptional, with the upperparts being deep rich blue. The Asian fairy-bluebird is sexually dimorphic in its plumage, the male being far brighter than the female, but the Philippine fairy-bluebird exhibits much less difference and the female is almost as bright as the male. The deep colour is provided by specialised naked feather-tip barbs. Although the fairy-bluebirds are highly visible in sunlight, they are much less visible in the shade of the forest.

== Distribution and habitat ==
The Asian fairy-bluebird has a discontinuous distribution from India to Java and Vietnam. In India, the species is present in the southwest of the country and in the northeast. From Burma, it has a continuous distribution (in suitable habitat) throughout most of Southeast Asia, and down into Borneo and Sumatra, as well as on the Andaman Islands. The species is rare in Sri Lanka. The Philippine fairy-bluebird is found on Luzon, Polillo, Leyte, Samar, Mindanao, Dinagat and Basilan. The Palawan fairy-bluebird is endemic to the island of Palawan.

The fairy-bluebirds are dependent upon fruit-producing forests, but all three species seem to exist in a wide range of forests, both evergreen and semi-evergreen. Within forests they are generally found in the canopy.

== Behaviour ==
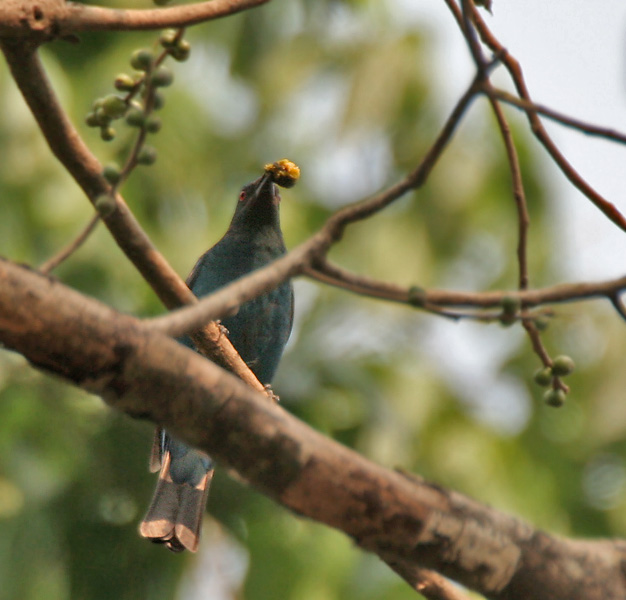
Female feeding on Ficus figs

Pairs or small groups (individuals are rarely seen alone) of fairy-bluebirds forage widely to obtain food. Fruit, particularly figs in the genus Ficus, are the most important item in the diet of fairy-bluebirds. Fairy-bluebirds will generally eat fruit of a certain size, and will crush larger fruits in order to make them manageable. Most food is obtained in the canopy. In addition to fruit, berries may be eaten, as well as nectar, although this behaviour has only been reported in birds in India. In contrast to adults, however, insects are the principal component of the diet of nestlings. In the Philippines, birds have been observed following troops of macaques, possibly in order to collect flushed insects.

Male courtship displays include elaborate vocalizations, which the female responds to with nest building. Nests are constructed in trees or tall bushes from twigs, moss and grasses, and males and females cooperate in rearing chicks.
