= Vocabulario de la lengua Bicol =

1865 book on the Bicol language

Vocabulario de la Lengua Bicol
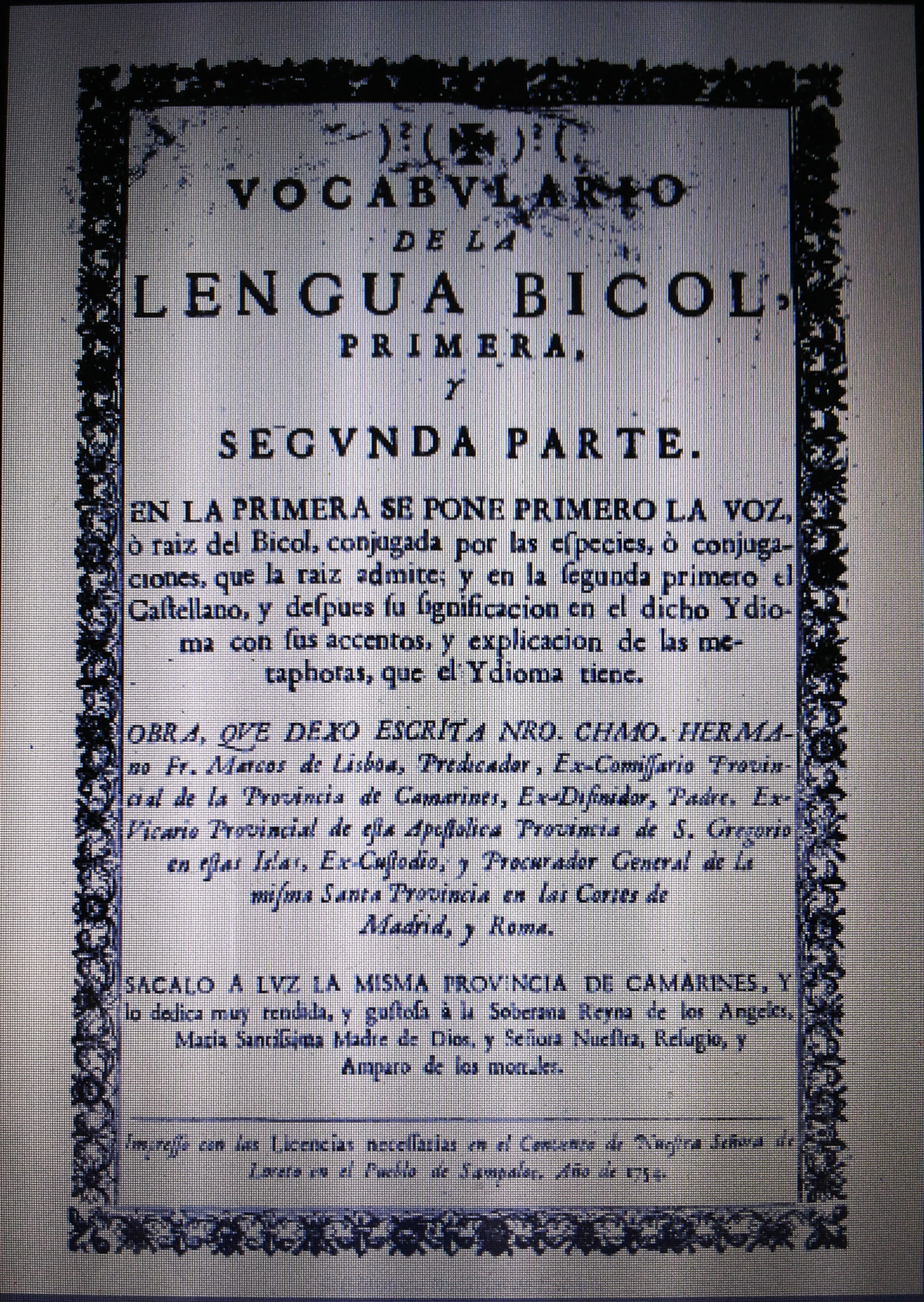
- Vocabulario de la lengua bicol, 1754
- Language: Bikol languages Spanish
- Genre: Dictionary
- Publisher: Colegio de Santo Tomas Publishing House
- Publication date: 1865
- Publication place: Captaincy General of the Philippines
- Media type: Print
- Preceded by: Vocabulario de la Lengua Bicol (1728/1754)

The Vocabulario de la lengua bicol (Spanish for Vocabulary of the Bicol language) is a list of vocabulary of the Bicol language, collected by Mark of Lisbon when he was assigned to Bicol Region, Philippines.

Lisboa, a Franciscan friar, resided in the Philippines from 1586 until 1618. He served in Ambos Camarines, where Bicol was widely spoken, from sometime between 1592 and 1602 until 1616. Lisboa died in Mexico in 1628. The Vocabulario was first published posthumously in 1754. A second edition of the Vocabulario was published in 1865 under the expressed order of Bishop Francisco Gainza. It contained 10,495 (Bikol-Español) word entries in 417 pages using 22-inch (560 mm) x 33-inch (840 mm) paper and 5,588 entries in the (Español-Bicol) section in 103 pages. Realubit describes the Bicol vocabulary as "broad in social scale and localization", but criticizes Lisboa's presentation of grammatical tense, affixes, and parts of speech.
