= Mark of Lisbon =

Portuguese Franciscan, historian and Bishop of Porto

Mark of Lisbon, in Portuguese Marcos de Lisboa, in Latin Marcus Ulyssiponensis, (1511-1591), was a Portuguese Franciscan, historian, and the Bishop of Porto.

While visiting the main convents of the Franciscan Order in Spain, Italy, and France, Mark collected a number of original documents about the order's history at the instance of the minister general, André Álvarez. Earlier, in 1532, the minister general, Paul Pisotti, had instructed all the provincials of the order to collect all documents they could find pertaining to the fifteenth century, to continue the Conformities of Bartholomew of Pisa. When these documents were gathered together, it was given to Mark, who compiled them together with information he himself had gathered, as well as that from the Chronicle of Marianus of Florence, into his Portuguese language work Chronicle of the Friars Minor. This was published in Lisbon from 1557 to 1568.

The work is made up almost entirely of biographies of illustrious men of the order, which makes the title somewhat misleading. It is of great historical value, especially since the original sources to which the author had access, have entirely disappeared.

Mark of Lisbon is confused with Franciscan friar and lexicographer Marcos de Lisboa who actually authored the first major vocabulary in the Bikol language in the Philippines, the Vocabulario de la lengua Bicol and which according to Malcolm Mintz was rendered in manuscript form around 1610. However, though it was compiled from 1602 to 1611, the dictionary would only be posthumously published in 1754, and Arte de la lengua Bicol (1647) from Andres de San Agustin preceded it in print.

== Bibliography ==
- Carvalho, José Adriano Moreira de Freitas [Publ.] : Frei Marcos de Lisboa : cronista franciscano e bispo do Porto, Porto, Faculdade de Letras do Porto, 2002. The contribution of Bernard Dompnier, "Les enjeux de l’édition française des Chroniques de frère Marc de Lisbonne" can be read online.
