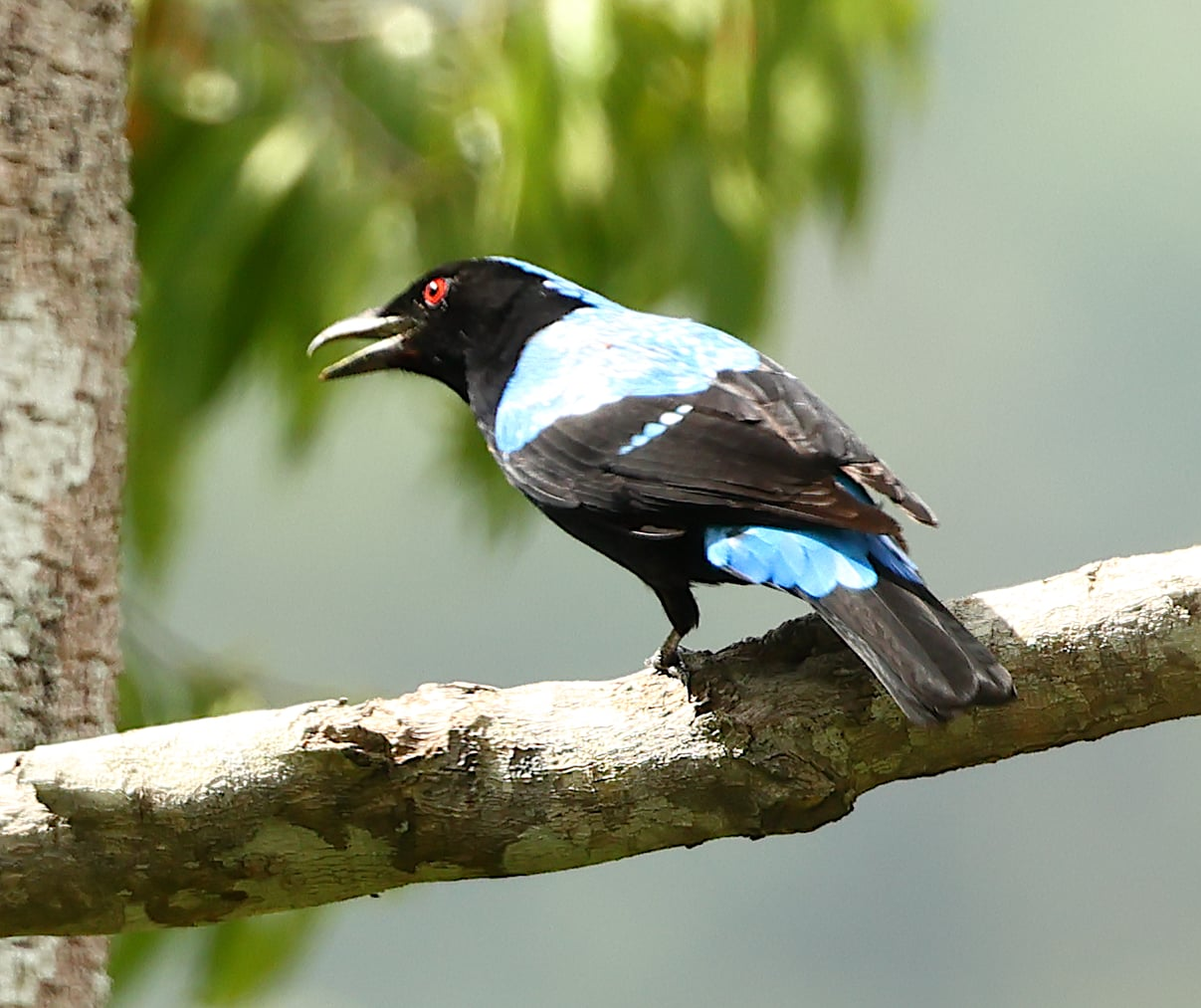
- Male
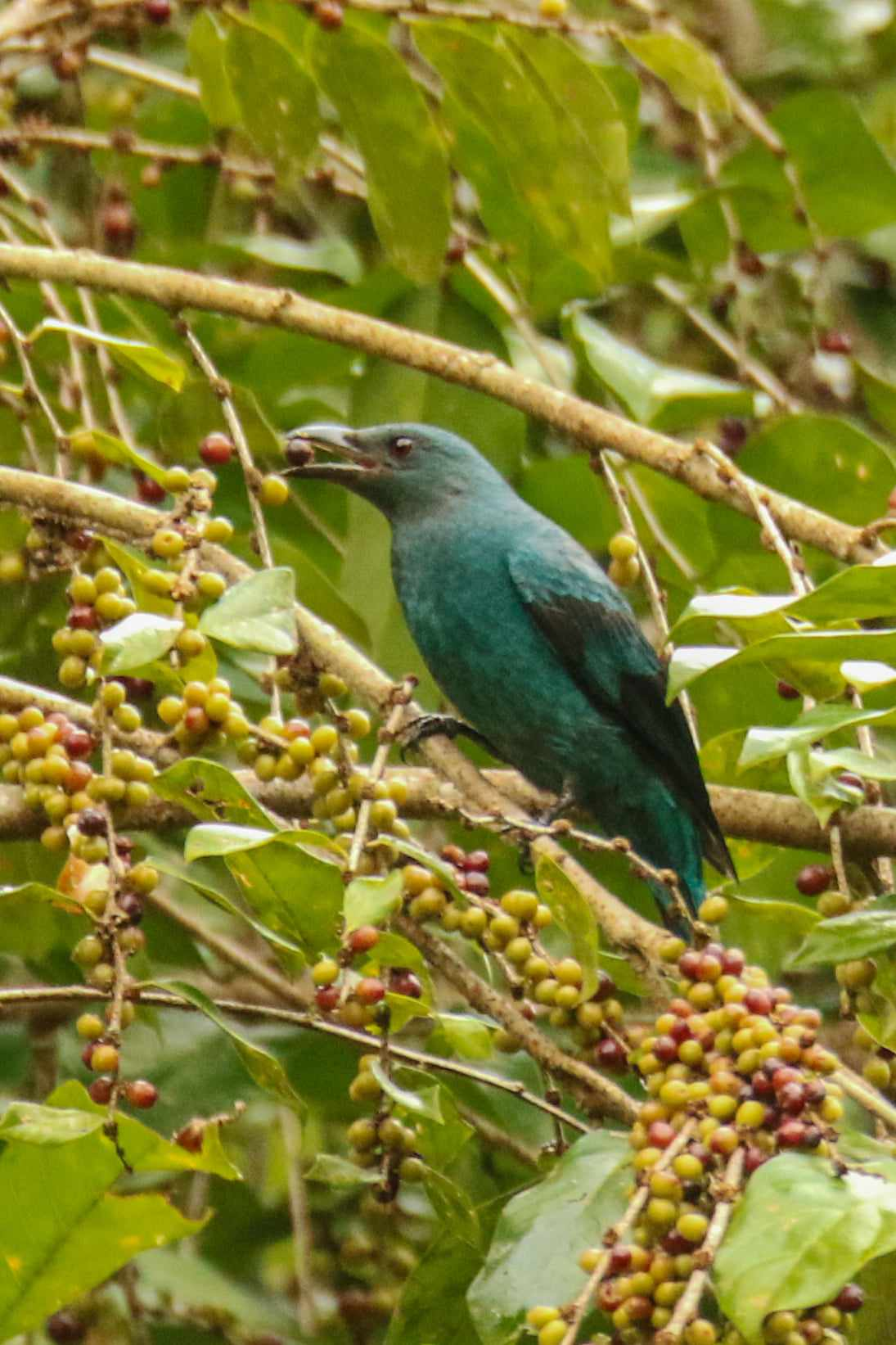
- Female

Conservation status
- Near Threatened (IUCN 3.1)

Scientific classification
- Kingdom: Animalia
- Phylum: Chordata
- Class: Aves
- Order: Passeriformes
- Family: Irenidae
- Genus: Irena
- Species: I. tweeddalii

Binomial name
- Irena tweeddalii Sharpe, 1877

= Palawan fairy-bluebird =

Endemic bird of the Philippines

The Palawan fairy-bluebird (Irena tweeddalii) is a species of bird in the family Irenidae. It is native to Balabac Island, Palawan and the Calamian Islands in the Philippines. Its natural habitats are tropical moist lowland forest and it is declining due to habitat destruction and deforestation.

== Description and taxonomy ==
Exhibits sexual dimorphism in which male are midnight black and electric blue while the female is dark turquoise with dark wingtips.

It was formerly conspecific with the Asian fairy-bluebird but split due to plummage differences with males have a lighter more electric blue versus the darker blue of the former. Females are duller and more turquoise in color.

It has been observed feeding on invertebrates but otherwise diet is largely unknown. It is often seen foraging alone or in pairs foraging in the understorey.

== Ecology and behavior ==
This specific species diet and breeding ecology has yet to be comprehensively studied but its diet is presumed to be very similar to the Asian fairy-bluebird which mainly feeds on berries, figs and nectar. It also supplements its diet with some insects. Forms small flocks and also joins mixed species flocks of insectivores to forage. The Asian fairy-bluebird nests 2 to 6 meters high in palms. The nest is small and shallow cup made of flimsily arranged twigs and is typically built by the female. Clutch size of 2, occasionally 3, eggs.

== Habitat and conservation status ==
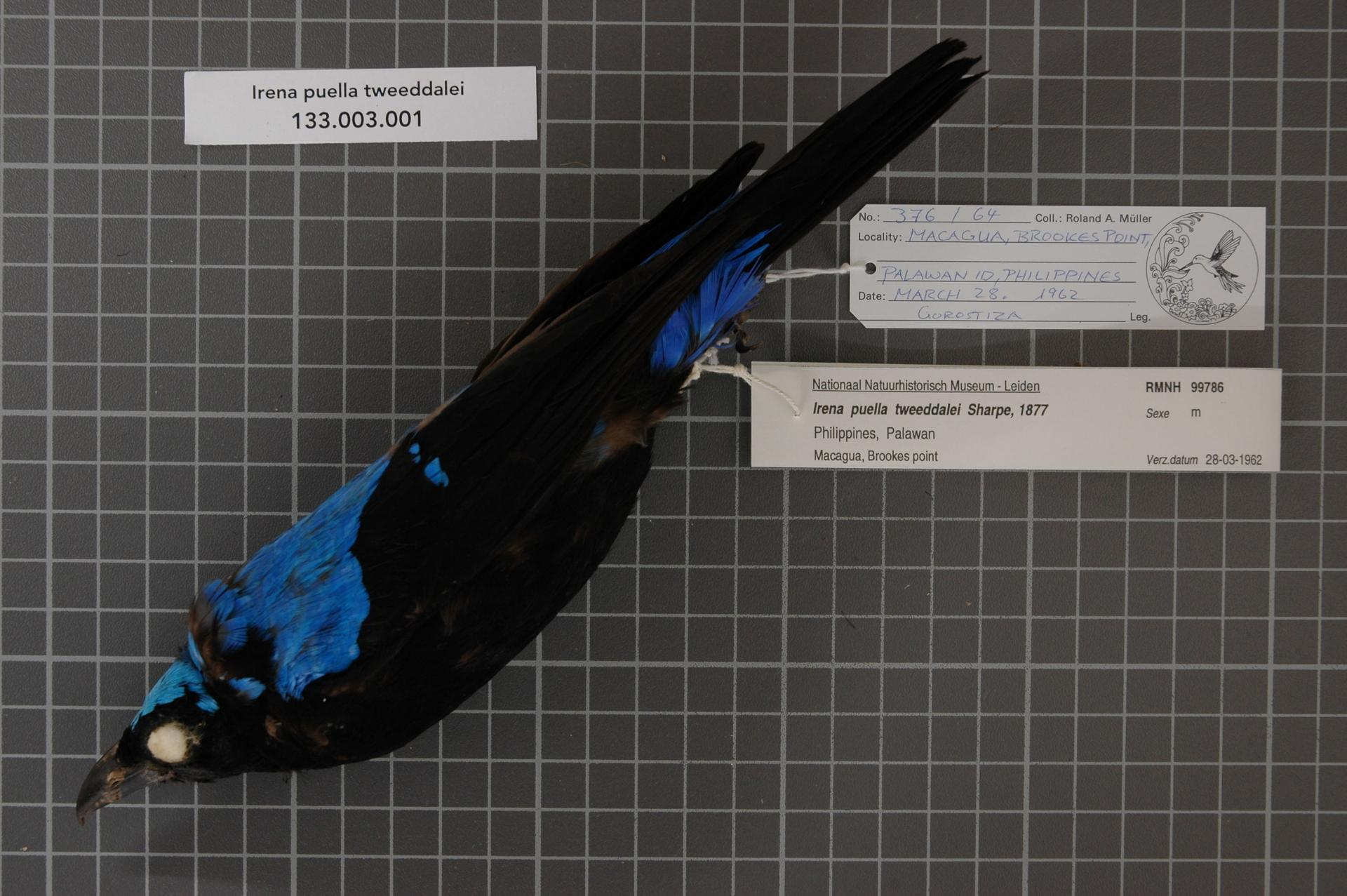
Preserved male specimen at Naturalis Biodiversity Center

The species inhabits tropical moist lowland primary forest and secondary forest up to 1,000 meters above sea level.

It is assessed as near threatened under the IUCN with populations believed to be decreasing due to habitat loss, deforestation, hunting and the cage bird trade. The whole of Palawan was designated as a Biosphere Reserve; however, protection and enforcement of laws has been difficult and these threats still continue. It occurs in the protected area in Puerto Princesa Subterranean River National Park.
