= Timeline of Manila =

The following is a timeline of the history of the city and metropolitan area of Manila, the capital city of the Philippines.

== 9th century onwards ==
- c. 900 CE - Tundun (Tondo) was at its peak and was a center of commerce and trade of the Tagalogs. It was during this era that the Chief and Commander of Tundun issued the Laguna Copperplate Inscription to Namwaran's clan on 21 April 900 CE.
- before the 11th century - Namayan was established by the Tagalog people at the Pasig River. It was led by the house of Lakantagkan during its peak in the 14th century.
- c. 13th Century - Maynila was supposedly founded by Avirjirkaya which spanned present day Intramuros according to Kapampangan historian Mariano A. Henson.
- Uncertain timestamp - Empress Sasanban became the Queen Regent of Namayan. According to oral tradition, she was a concubine of Anka Widyaya of Java and bore a child named Prince Balagtas
- Uncertain timestamp - the Tagalog and Kapampangan-fortified city of Cainta was established on an upriver area which occupied the shores on both sides of a waterway of the Pasig River. It was located not far from where the Pasig River meets the Lake of Ba-i.
- 15th century - Gat Lontok and Dayang Kalangitan became the co-rulers of Pasig.
- c.1480 - Salalila became the Rajah of Maynila.
- 1521 - Sibunao became the Lakandula of Tondo and Prince Ache became Rajah of Maynila.

== 16th century ==
- May 24, 1570 - The Battle of Manila between Rajah Sulayman and Martin de Goiti. The battle concluded with the city being set on fire.
- 1571 - 24 June: Spaniards Martín de Goiti, Juan de Salcedo and Miguel López de Legazpi arrived. In August 1571, Legazpi instructed his nephew Juan de Salcedo to "pacify" Cainta. After travelling several days upriver, Salcedo laid siege to the city and eventually found a weak spot on the wall. The final Spanish attack annihilated over 400 residents of Cainta, including their leader Gat Maitan.
- 1572 - The Spanish city was attacked and was almost seized by Chinese pirates.
- 1573 - The Spanish galleon trade began.
- 1574 - A Chinese pirate named Limahong tried to seize Manila.
- 1579 - The Catholic Diocese of Manila was established.
- 1583 - Fire.
- 1584 - The Real Audiencia of Manila of the Viceroyalty of New Spain was established.
- 1590
  - The Printing Press was established.
  - Construction of walls and other defences began.
- 1603 - Chinese unrest.
- 1607 - The San Agustin Church was consecrated.
- 1611 - The University of Santo Tomas was established by Catholic Dominicans.
- 1615 - The Manila-Acapulco galleon trade began.
- 1620 - The Colegio de San Juan de Letran was established by Catholic Dominicans.
- 1645 - 1645 Luzon earthquake.

== 18th -19th century ==
A view of the walled city of Intramuros and Manila Bay from the suburbs, drawn by Fernando Brambila during the Malaspina Expedition, c. 1792

- 1762 - The British occupation of Manila began.
- 1764 - The British occupation of Manila ended in honor of the Treaty of Paris; the Spanish regained hold of the city.
- 1823 - Population: 38,000.
- 1837 - Port opened to foreign trade.
- 1848 - The Diario de Manila newspaper started its publication.
- 1852 - September: Earthquake.
- 1859
  - Escuela Municipal de Manila, the precursor of the Ateneo de Manila University was founded.
  - The Ilustración Filipina magazine started its publication.
- 1863 - 3 June: Earthquake.
- 1865 - The Manila Observatory was founded.
- 1866 - The Canal de la Reina was dug in Binondo.
- 1870 - 23 March: Fire in Binondo.
- 1876 - Population: 93,595.
- 1880 - July: Earthquake.
- 1881 - Hong Kong-Manila telegraph in operation.
- 1882
  - October: Typhoon.
  - Water supply was inaugurated.
- 1887
  - The National Library of the Philippines was founded.
  - Population: 176,777.
- 1888 - The Commercial Association of Lumber was established.
- 1889 - The Tabacalera Flor de la Isabela cigar factory was built in Paco.
- 1892 - The Dagupan-Manila railway started its operation.
- 1893
  - Electrical lighting was installed.
  - Fire.
- 1896 - 5 December: 1896 Manila mutiny.
  - 30 December: execution of Dr. Jose Rizal at Bagumbayan.
- 1898
  - 25 July - 13 August: Battle of Manila (1898); the United States claimed governance.
  - The Manila Times English-language newspaper started its publication.
- 1899
  - 4–5 February: Battle of Manila (1899).
  - Taft Avenue ("Calle Rizal") was laid out.
- 1900 - The Instituto de Mujeres and the American Circulating Library was established.

== 20th century ==
=== 1900s-1940s ===
- 1901
  - The City of Manila administrative entity was created, composed of Binondo, Ermita, Intramuros, Malate, Pandacan, Quiapo, Santa Cruz, Barrio San Nicolas, San Miguel, San Fernando de Dilao (modern day Paco), Sampaloc and Tondo.
  - The capital of the Philippines was relocated to Manila from Malolos.
  - Arsenio Cruz-Herrera became mayor.
  - The National Museum of the Philippines was established.
  - The Philippine Normal University was established.
  - The United States military camp, Fort William McKinley was established near the city.
  - The Philippine Constabulary was established and the general headquarters and military camp bases were located in the capital city.
  - The Philippine Scouts was established and the general headquarters and military camp bases were located near the capital city.
- 1902 -
  - Manila's border was expanded to include Santa Ana de Sapa.
  - The Manila Grand Opera House opened in Santa Cruz.
- 1903
  - Population: 219,928 city; 330,345 metro.
  - Trozo Fire in Manila (May 1903)
- 1905
  - The Manila Elks Club was established.
  - Félix Roxas became mayor.
- 1908
  - The University of the Philippines Manila was founded.
  - The famous Manila Carnival was held for the first time.
- 1909 - The Philippine Library was established.
- 1910
  - Basketball, volleyball, and boy scouting were started in the Philippines at the Manila YMCA by YMCA Physical Director Elwood Stanley Brown.
  - The "Great Fire in Manila" transpired in Binondo, the damage was worth over two million pesos.
- 1911 - De La Salle College, known as De La Salle University was founded.
- 1912 - The Manila Hotel opened.
- 1913
  - The first Far Eastern Championship Games, also called "the first Oriental Olympic Games," were held at the Carnival grounds (later the site of the Rizal Memorial Sports Stadium) in Malate, on the 3rd to the 7th of February, with participants from the US Philippine Islands, China, Japan, the British East Indies (Malaya), Thailand, and British Hong Kong.
  - The Rizal Monument was erected.
- 1917 - Justo Lukban became mayor.
- 1918 - Population: 285,306 city; 469,955 metro.
- 1919 - The United States Air Service established Camp Nichols near Fort William McKinley, just south of Manila.
- 1920 - Ramón Fernández became mayor.
- 1923 - The Peking Council, Tokyo Council and the Manila Council - the first Boy Scouts of America Councils in Asia, were organized. (The 1973 Golden Jubilee Jamboree of the Boy Scouts of the Philippines was dated from this year.)
- 1924 - Miguel Romuáldez became mayor.
- 1926 - The Legislative Building was inaugurated in Ermita.
- 1927 - Tomás Earnshaw became mayor.
- 1928 - The Institute of Accountancy, which later became the Far Eastern University, was founded in Sampaloc by Nicanor Reyes et al.
- 1930 - The Legazpi-Urdaneta Monument was erected.
- 1935
  - Metropolitan Theater was built.
  - Valeriano Fugoso became mayor.
  - Grace Park Airfield began its operation in Caloocan.
  - The city became the capital of the newly-formed Commonwealth of the Philippines.
  - The Philippine Commonwealth Army was established and the general headquarters and military camp bases were established in the capital city.
- 1939 - Population: 623,492.
- 1941
  - The City of Greater Manila was formed, which merged the city and municipal governments of Manila, Quezon City, Caloocan, Makati, Mandaluyong, Parañaque, Pasay, and San Juan.
  - Jorge B. Vargas became mayor.
  - The Manila City Hall was completed.
  - The Philippine Commonwealth Army's general headquarters and camp base in the city's capital were disestablished, and was occupied by the Japanese Imperial forces.
- 1942
  - The Japanese occupation began.
  - León G. Guinto, Sr. became mayor.
  - The general headquarters and military camp bases of the Philippine Commonwealth Army were moved to the provinces.
- 1945
  - February: The Manila massacre initiated by the Japanese forces transpired.
  - 3 February - 3 March: The World War II Battle of Manila (1945) ensued; the Japanese forces were defeated.
  - 1 August: The City of Greater Manila was disestablished.
  - Juan L. Nolasco became mayor.
  - The General Headquarters and military camp bases of the Philippine Commonwealth Army and the Philippine Constabulary was re-established and reactivated in the city's capital after liberation from the Japanese.
- 1946 - The city became part of the newly inaugurated Third Republic of the Philippines.
- 1947 - The Republic Theatre opened.
- 1948
  - The capital of the Philippines was relocated from Manila to Quezon City.
  - Manuel A. Roxas High School was established in Paco.
  - Manuel de la Fuente became mayor.
  - Population: 983,906 city; 1,569,148 metro.
  - The Manila American Cemetery and Memorial was established near the city.
- 1949 - 18 June: City legislative districts for House of Representatives of the Philippines was expanded from two to four.

=== 1950s-1990s ===
- 1952
  - Arsenio Lacson became mayor.
  - National Press Club established their headquarters in the city.
- 1954 - Holy Child Catholic School opened in Tondo.
- 1959 - The Ramon Magsaysay High School was established in España, Manila.
- 1960
  - The Araneta Coliseum opened in Quezon City.
  - Population: 1,138,611 city; 2,462,288 metro.
- 1961 - The new terminal of Manila Airport opened.
- 1962 - Antonio Villegas became mayor.
- 1966 - The Cultural Center of the Philippines was founded.
  - 24-25 October: Manila Summit Conference.
- 1970
  - Zone One Tondo Organization was established.
  - Population: 1,330,788 city; 3,966,685 metro.
- 1971 - Ramon Bagatsing became mayor.
  - 21 August: Plaza Miranda Bombing.
- 1973 - Some 3000 Boy Scouts camped out and conducted a massive clean-up of Intramuros, from the 9th to the 11th of February.
- 1974 - Miss Universe 1974 pageant was held.
- 1975
  - 1 October: Thrilla in Manila.
  - Metropolitan Manila Commission was created to administer not just the city of Manila but also Caloocan, Mandaluyong, Makati, Malabon, Marikina, Muntinlupa, Navotas, Pasay, Pasig, Las Piñas, Parañaque, Pateros, Quezon City, San Juan, San Pedro, Taguig, and Valenzuela.
  - The Metro Manila Film Festival was first held.
  - Population: 1,479,116 city; 4,880,006 metro.
- 1976
  - Capital of the Philippines was relocated to Manila from Quezon City.
  - Philippine International Convention Center was built in Pasay.
  - Ali Mall, the first shopping mall in the Philippines, opened in Quezon City.
  - Harrison Plaza opened in Malate, Manila.
- 1979 - Sampaloc flea market was officially inaugurated.
- 1980 - Population: 5,924,563 metro.
- 1981
  - Sister city relationship was established with San Francisco, USA.
  - Catholic pope visited the city.
- 1982 - Metro Manila Commission for Squatters was established.
- 1983
  - 21 August: Assassination of Benigno Aquino, Jr. at Manila International Airport.
  - 31 August: Funeral procession of Benigno Aquino, Jr. passed by the capital from the Santo Domingo Church en route to Parañaque.
- 1984
  - Manila Light Rail Transit System Line 1 began its operation.
  - Population: 1,728,441 city; 6,720,050 urban agglomeration (estimate).
- 1985 - SM City North EDSA opened as the 1st SM Supermall.
- 1986
  - February: People Power Revolution.
  - May: Mel Lopez became mayor.
- 1987
  - First Coup Attempt
  - City legislative districts for the House of Representatives expanded to the present six.
- 1989 - Second Coup Attempt
- 1987 - January: Mendiola Massacre.
- 1992 - Alfredo Lim became mayor.
- 1993 - the Easter Regatta, later called the President's Cup Regatta, was held for the first time in Manila Bay
- 1994
  - Museo Pambata opened in Ermita.
  - 20 May: Miss Universe 1994 pageant was held.
  - Population: 8,594,150 urban agglomeration (estimate).
- 1995
  - Metropolitan Manila Development Authority was established.
  - Catholic pope visited the city.
- 1996 - Ozone Disco fire
- 1998 - Lito Atienza became mayor.
- 1999 - Manila Metro Rail Transit System Line 3 began its operation.
- 2000
  - 30 December: Rizal Day bombings.
  - Green Papaya Art Projects was founded.
  - Population: 1,581,082 city; 9,932,560 metro.

== 21st century ==
- 2001
  - January 16–20: Second EDSA Revolution.
  - April 25–May 1: EDSA III protest.
- 2002 - Bus bombing.
- 2003
  - Army mutiny.
  - Manila Light Rail Transit System Line 2 began its operation.
- 2006 - May: Mall of Asia opened in Pasay.
- 2007
  - June 30: Alfredo Lim was re-elected as mayor.
  - October 19: explosion in Glorietta
  - November 29: Coup attempt.
  - Asian Network of Major Cities 21 met in Manila.
  - MO_Space art gallery was founded.
- 2009 - September: Typhoon.
- 2010
  - 23 August: Manila hostage crisis in Rizal Park.
  - 26 September: School bombing.
  - Population: 1,652,171 city; 11,855,975 metro.
- 2012 - August: Flooding.
- 2013
  - August: Million People March.
  - Joseph Estrada became mayor.
- 2015
  - January: Catholic pope visited the city.
  - Population: 1,780,148.
- 2016
  - 22 May: Concert tragedy.
  - 14 August: Tornado.
- 2017
  - 30 January: Miss Universe 2016 pageant was held.
  - June: Gunman Attack in Resorts World Manila.
- 2018 - May: National Museum of Natural History opened in Ermita.
- 2019
  - 30 June: Isko Moreno became mayor of Manila.
- 2022
  - 30 June: Honey Lacuna became mayor of Manila. She is the first female to hold the position.

== See also ==
- History of Manila
- Metro Manila
- List of mayors of Manila
- Other names of Manila
- List of historical markers in Manila
- Greater Manila Area
- Mega Manila
- Timeline of Philippine history
- List of cities by population density

== Bibliography ==
Published in the 19th century

- Jedidiah Morse; Richard C. Morse (1823), "Manilla", A New Universal Gazetteer (4th ed.), New Haven: S. Converse
- William Milburn; Thomas Thornton (1825). "Manilla". Oriental Commerce; or the East India Trader's Complete Guide. London: Kingsbury, Parbury, and Allen.
- Fedor Jagor (1875). "Manilla". Travels in the Philippines. London: Chapman and Hall.
- John Ramsay McCulloch (1880), "Manilla", in Hugh G. Reid (ed.), A Dictionary, Practical, Theoretical and Historical of Commerce and Commercial Navigation, London: Longmans, Green, and Co.
- "Philippines: Manila". The Chronicle & Directory for China, Corea, Japan, the Philippines, Indo-China, Straits Settlements, Siam, Borneo, Malay States, &c. Hong Kong: Daily Press. 1892.
- Margherita Arlina Hamm (1898), Manila and the Philippines, London: F.T. Neely, OL 7237592M
- John Foreman (1899), "(Manila)", The Philippine Islands (2nd ed.), New York: C. Scribner's Sons
- Manila and the Philippine Islands: an up to date handbook of facts, New York: Philippines Company, 1899, OL 24648057M

Published in the 20th century

- "Manila", Chambers's Encyclopaedia, London: W. & R. Chambers, 1901
- Commercial Directory of Manila, Manila, 1901, OL 7214150M
- Burton Holmes (1901), "Manila", The Burton Holmes Lectures, Battle Creek, Michigan: Little-Preston, OCLC 5082081
- C.W. Rosenstock, ed. (1904), Manila City Directory
- Historical Notes Concerning Manila. United States government. 1904.
- Kemlein & Johnson's guide and map of Manila and vicinity. Manila, Kemlein & Johnson. 1908.
- Manila, the pearl of the Orient, Manila, Philippine Islands: Manila Merchants' Association., 1908, OCLC 5296360, OL 7012107M
- "Manila" . Encyclopædia Britannica. Vol. 17 (11th ed.). 1910. pp. 578–580.
- Philip M. Finegan (1910). "Manila". Catholic Encyclopedia. New York.
- Benjamin Vincent (1910), "Manilla", Haydn's Dictionary of Dates (25th ed.), London: Ward, Lock & Co.
- George Amos Miller (1912). Interesting Manila: Historical Narratives Concerning the Pearl of the Orient (3rd ed.). Manila: E.C. McCullough.
- Philippines. Office of Public Welfare Commissioner. (1922), Directory of charitable and social service organizations and institutions in the city of Manila (2nd ed.), Manila: Bureau of Printing, OL 7214795M
- Mauro Garcia, ed. (1971), Focus on old Manila, Manila: Philippine Historical Association
- Edilberto De Jesus. 'Manila's first factories', Philippine Historical Review, 4 (1971)
- Nicolas Zafra (1974), The colonization of the Philippines and the beginnings of the Spanish city of Manila, Manila: National Historical Commission
- William F. Stinner & Melinda Bacol-Montilla (1981). "Population Deconcentration in Metropolitan Manila in the Twentieth Century". Journal of Developing Areas. 16 (1): 3–16. JSTOR 4190969. PMID 12338830.
- Daniel F. Doeppers. Manila, 1900-1941: Social change in a late colonial metropolis (New Haven: Yale University Southeast Asia Studies, 1984).
- Hans F. Illy (1986). "Regulation and Evasion: Street-Vendors in Manila". Policy Sciences. 19 (1): 61–81. doi:10.1007/BF02124484. JSTOR 4532068. S2CID 85450985.
- Ton van Naerssen (1989). "Continuity and Change in the Urban Poor Movement of Manila, the Philippines". Urban Social Movements in the Third World. Routledge. p. 199+. ISBN 1-136-85686-2.
- Ramon Ma Zaragoza (1990), Old Manila, Singapore: Oxford University Press, ISBN 0195889738
- Melinda Tria Kerkvliet, Manila workers' unions, 1900-1950 (Quezon City: New Day Publishers, 1992).
- Victor V. Sumsky (1992). "City as Political Actor: Manila, February 1986". Alternatives: Global, Local, Political. 17 (4): 479–492. doi:10.1177/030437549201700404. JSTOR 40644756. S2CID 149272236.
- Jack Arn (1995). "Pathway To The Periphery: Urbanization, Creation Of A Relative Surplus Population, And Political Outcomes In Manila, Philippines". Urban Anthropology and Studies of Cultural Systems and World Economic Development. 24 (3/4): 189–228. JSTOR 40553284.
- Schellinger and Salkin, ed. (1996). "Manila". International Dictionary of Historic Places: Asia and Oceania. UK: Routledge. p. 565+. ISBN 9781884964046.
- Xavier Huetz de Lemps. 'Shifts in meaning of "Manila" in the nineteenth century', in Old ties and new solidarities: Studies on Philippine communities, ed. C. J.-H. Macdonald and G. M. Pesigan (Quezon City: Ateneo de Manila University Press, 2000)

Published in the 21st century

- Charles L. Choguill (2001). "Manila: City of Hope or a Planner's Nightmare?". Built Environment. 27 (2): 85–95. JSTOR 23287514.
- Xavier Huetz de Lemps [in French] (2001). "Waters in Nineteenth Century Manila". Philippine Studies. 49 (4): 488–517. JSTOR 42633496. PMID 18551808.
- Joseph Burzynski (2002). "Timber Trade and the Growth of Manila, 1864-1881". Philippine Studies. 50 (2): 168–192. JSTOR 42634459.
- Cristina Pantoja Hidalgo (2002). "Metro Manila: City in Search of a Myth". Philippine Studies. 50 (3): 303–326. JSTOR 42634469.
- "Manila", Philippines, Lonely Planet, 2003, p. 87+, ISBN 9781740592109, OL 8906497M
- "Manila". Understanding Slums: Case Studies for the Global Report 2003. United Nations Human Settlements Programme and University College London. 2003.
- Bruce P. Lenman (2004). "Manila". In Ooi Keat Gin (ed.). Southeast Asia: A Historical Encyclopedia. ABC-CLIO. p. 854+. ISBN 978-1-57607-770-2.
- Yoshihiro Chiba (2005). "Cigar-Makers in American Colonial Manila: Survival during Structural Depression in the 1920s". Journal of Southeast Asian Studies. 36 (3): 373–397. doi:10.1017/s0022463405000214. JSTOR 20072667. S2CID 161723850.
- Gavin Shatkin (2007). Collective Action and Urban Poverty Alleviation: Community Organizations and the Struggle for Shelter in Manila. Ashgate Publishing. ISBN 978-0-7546-4786-7.
- Marco Garrido (2008). "Civil and Uncivil Society Symbolic Boundaries and Civic Exclusion in Metro Manila". Philippine Studies. 56 (4): 443–465. JSTOR 42633976.
- Greg Bankoff (2012). "Tale of Two Cities: the Pyro-Seismic Morphology of 19th-century Manila". In Greg Bankoff; et al. (eds.). Flammable Cities: Urban Conflagration and the Making of the Modern World. USA: University of Wisconsin Press. pp. 170–189. ISBN 978-0-299-28383-4.
