= Tomás Regalado =

Tomás Regalado may refer to:

- Tomás Regalado (American politician) (born 1947), retired American politician and former mayor of Miami, Florida
- Tomás Regalado (Salvadoran politician) (1861–1906), former president of El Salvador

== See also ==
- Regalado (surname)
