= PAGASA =

National weather, climate, and astronomy bureau of the Philippines

Philippine Atmospheric, Geophysical and Astronomical Services Administration
- Pangasiwaan ng Pilipinas sa Serbisyong Atmosperiko, Heopisiko at Astronomiko

Agency overview
- Formed: December 8, 1972; 53 years ago
- Preceding agency: Weather Bureau
- Jurisdiction: Philippine Area of Responsibility (PAR) and adjacent areas
- Headquarters: Science Garden, Senator Miriam P. Defensor-Santiago Avenue, Diliman, Quezon City; 14°38′37.1″N 121°2′39.8″E
- Employees: 806 (2024)
- Annual budget: ₱2.83 billion (2026)
- Agency executive: Nathaniel T. Servando, Ph.D., Administrator
- Parent agency: Department of Science and Technology
- Website: pagasa.dost.gov.ph

The Philippine Atmospheric, Geophysical and Astronomical Services Administration (Filipino: Pangasiwaan ng Pilipinas sa Serbisyong Atmosperiko, Heopisiko at Astronomiko), abbreviated as PAGASA, (Note: Tagalog pronunciation: [pagˈasa], from the Tagalog word pag-asa, meaning lit. 'hope') is the national meteorological and hydrological services (NMHS) agency of the Philippines. It is mandated to provide protection against natural calamities, ensure the safety, well-being, and economic security of the people, and promote national progress through scientific and technological services in meteorology, hydrology, climatology, astronomy, and other geophysical sciences. Created on December 8, 1972, through the reorganization of the Weather Bureau, PAGASA is one of the scientific and technological service institutes of the Department of Science and Technology.

== History ==
=== The Observatorio Meteorológico de Manila ===
Formal meteorological and astronomical services in the Philippines began in 1865 with the establishment of the Observatorio Meteorológico de Manila (Manila Meteorological Observatory) in Padre Faura Street, Manila when Francisco Colina, a young Jesuit scholastic and professor at the Ateneo Municipal de Manila started a systematic observation and recording of the weather two or three times a day. Jaime Nonell, another Jesuit scholastic, wrote a brief treatise on these observations, which was printed by the Diario de Manila. The treatise attracted the attention of businessmen in Manila, leading to a request to the Jesuit director, Fr. Juan Vidal, SJ, for regular observations to warn the public against approaching typhoons. The businessmen financed the procurement and acquisition of an instrument called the universal meteorograph (an invention of another Jesuit, Fr. Angelo Seechi, SJ of the Vatican Observatory in Rome) which greatly aided the day and night observations of the weather.

In 1866, Federico Faura, SJ became the director of the observatory in recognition of his scientific abilities. During this time, the observatory was engaged in the systematic observation of Philippine weather. On July 7, 1879, after data comparison with another Jesuit cleric in the West Indies, the observatory issued a warning indicating that a tropical cyclone was crossing northern Luzon. The colonial government took every possible precaution based on the reliability of the warning. The slight losses from the typhoon finally and permanently cemented the reputation of the observatory. This was followed by a prediction in November 1879 that a tropical cyclone would pass by Manila.

The observatory began conducting seismological and terrestrial magnetism observations in 1880. In 1885, the observatory started time service and a system of visual (semaphore) weather warnings for merchant shipping. In 1886, the Faura Aneroid barometer was released. In 1887, a section devoted to the study of terrestrial magnetism was set up. Six years later, the first maps of terrestrial magnetism in the Philippines were published. In 1890, the seismological service was officially established. In 1899, the astronomical section was opened.

This reputation reached foreign shores, and other observatories began requesting for the monthly Boletin del Observatorio de Manila. The growing demand for the services of the observatory led to the issuance of a Spanish royal decree on April 21, 1894, that recognized the observatory as an official institution under the Jesuit order, with full support from the Spanish Crown. This led to the establishment of a network of secondary stations in various points of Luzon and Visayas.

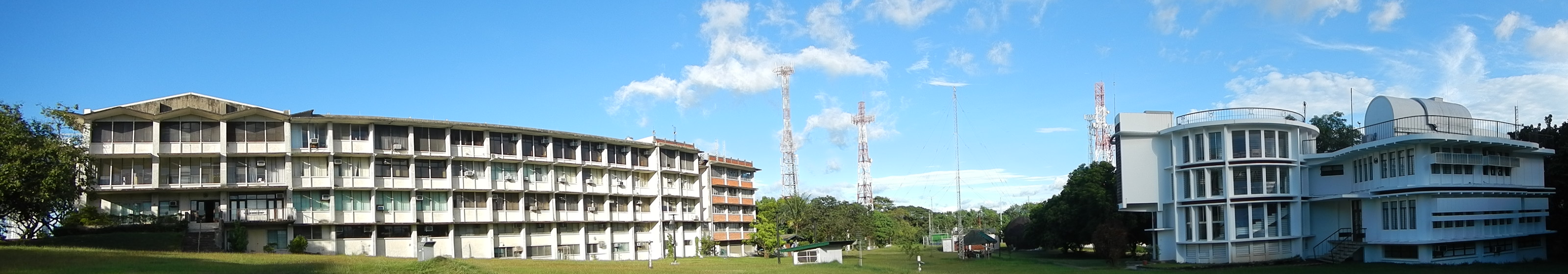
Manila Observatory

=== American period: The Weather Bureau ===
Following the Spanish–American War and under the Treaty of Paris, on December 10, 1898, Spain ceded the Philippine Islands to the United States. After a period of great political turbulence that climaxed in the outbreak of Philippine–American War in 1899, an Insular Government was established. On May 22, 1901, the Philippine Commission enacted Act No. 131, reorganizing the Manila Observatory into the Weather Bureau under the Department of Interior. With the establishment of the Department of Agriculture and Natural Resources (DANR) on January 1, 1917, the Weather Bureau was transferred from the Department of Interior to the DANR. With the establishment of the Commonwealth of the Philippines, the DANR was reorganized into the Department of Agriculture and Commerce.

For nearly 45 years, the Weather Bureau remained active and famous in international expositions and scientific expeditions and continued to be well known for its accurate typhoon forecasts and scientific works in the field of meteorology, geomagnetism, and astronomy. The first weather map in the Far East, released in 1908 by Fr. Coronas, became an important tool in tropical cyclone forecasting thereon. The bureau's published works on meteorology, terrestrial magnetism, and astronomy were well known and had later proven to be of great value to the American forces in the liberation of the Philippines from the Japanese during the Second World War.

=== Second World War ===
On October 4, 1943, with the establishment of the Second Philippine Republic as a puppet state of Japan during its occupation, the Weather Bureau was transferred to the Department of Public Works and Communications. The bureau was removed from the direction of the Jesuits and for the first time, the bureau had an all-Filipino staff headed by Mr. Maximo Lachica, head of the Department of Geodetic Engineering of the University of the Philippines. The Japanese occupation period marked limited activity in the Central Office. However, in the field, bureau personnel were instrumental in bringing accurate weather information over enemy-occupied territory to the combined liberation forces of the American and Filipino soldiers.

In February 1945, the Second World War brought the operations of the Weather Bureau to a halt when its offices were destroyed during the Battle of Manila. Nothing but the burnt-out shell of its astronomical dome along Padre Faura Street bore testimony to its once glorious past. All the instruments, records, and mass of scientific knowledge accumulated through the decades were lost. After the war, the Observatorio ceased to function as the Weather Bureau. The Observatorio resumed independent operations in 1951 as the Manila Observatory.

=== Postwar Era (1945–1972): Rebirth ===
The rebirth of the Weather Bureau began on July 24, 1945, when it was reestablished by seven constituent personnel under the leadership of Edilberto Parulan as Officer-in-Charge. In 1946, under the Tydings War Damage Act (Philippine Rehabilitation Act of 1946), a US Weather Bureau mission was sent to Manila by the United States government to undertake a survey of the needs of the Weather Bureau. As a result, the Bureau was able to acquire meteorological equipment and technical assistance from the United States that paved the way for the establishment of standard weather services patterned after similar meteorological institutions in more technically advanced countries. Furthermore, the Weather Bureau was transferred to the Department of Commerce and Industry. The Bureau's functions were then carried out by five divisions (Synoptic, Climatological, Geophysical, Astronomical, and Administrative).

In 1947, the central office of the Weather Bureau was moved to Marsman Building, opposite Pier 15 at the Port Area of Manila, while the Forecasting Center was transferred to the old Balagbag terminal, site of the first terminal of Manila International Airport, and became the Manila Main Meteorological Office (MMMO). The first post-war geophysical observatory of the bureau was established in 1949 behind the campus of the University of the Philippines in Diliman. In 1948, a set of electromagnetic photo recording seismographs was installed to improve its seismological services. On April 5, 1949, the Philippines was admitted into the World Meteorological Organization (WMO), with the Weather Bureau as its national meteorological service. In the same year, temperature, relative humidity, and pressure observations in the upper atmosphere were made twice daily by the Laoag, Cebu and Zamboanga field stations.

In 1950, a teletype service-connected the MMMO to Clark Air Force Base, US Naval Station Sangley Point and the Bureau of Telecommunications (precursor to the current National Telecommunications Commission. Moreover, the exchange of weather reports with foreign countries, aircraft-in-flight, and four aeronautical stations in the country – Laoag, Legazpi, Cebu and Zamboanga began this year. Private radio systems and the then National Civil Defense Administration also helped to facilitate the reception of data and dissemination of the forecasts and warnings. In 1954, radio transmissions of time signals (which were done seven times daily) began in the geophysical observatory (which was now called Astronomical Observatory at this time).

Weather surveillance radar was first installed in the Philippines in 1963 atop the Central Office of the Weather Bureau (but this was destroyed beyond repair by a fire in 1978). In 1965, on its centenary, half of the weather stations across the country were already linked with each other by single side-band radio transceivers, forming an independent meteorological communication system. In 1968, the Philippines joined the Typhoon Committee formed by the Economic Commission for Asia and the Far East (ECAFE, now Economic and Social Commission for Asia and the Pacific or ESCAP) and the WMO. 1969 saw the transfer of the central office from the Marsman Building to 1424, Quezon Boulevard Extension in Quezon City.

1969 also ushered in the 5-year "WMO Training and Research Project, Manila". Composed of the Institute of Meteorology in the Weather Bureau and the Department of Meteorology in the University of the Philippines, the project aimed to meet the training needs of the country's meteorological personnel and to carry out research in various fields of meteorology. The institute provided technical in-service training at various levels while the department offered a post-graduate course leading to a Master of Science degree in meteorology. With the implementation of the project, the acquisition of an IBM 1130 was realized and computerization in the bureau came of age. A telemetry system in the Marikina River Basin was then set up which led to the bureau's initial efforts in flood forecasting.

Satellite meteorology came to the Philippines in 1970 when an Automatic Picture Transmission system was set up to intercept photo transmission of the upper atmosphere by weather satellites. The first post-war major research initiative of the bureau was launched in the same year. Called the "Typhoon Research Project, its launch in 1970 was made possible through the financial assistance of the National Science Development Board. In 1971, upon the invitation of the Philippines, the ECAFE/WMO Joint Unit was reallocated in Manila and was rechristened as the Typhoon Committee Secretariat. In the same year, the linking of five weather surveillance radars installed across different parts of the country and the Manila radar station (it was not yet destroyed until 1978) paved the way for the Weather Radar Surveillance Network of the bureau.

=== 1970s: From Weather Bureau to PAGASA ===
In 1970, several typhoons, including super typhoons Sening, Titang and Yoling, battered the Philippines, leaving thousands dead and millions of dollars' worth of damage in their wake. As a response, in 1972, during the martial law rule of President Ferdinand Marcos, the Weather Bureau was abolished and a new agency, the Philippine Atmospheric, Geophysical and Astronomical Services Administration (PAGASA) was established pursuant to the Atmospheric, Geophysical and Astronomical Science Act of 1972 (Presidential Decree No. 78, s. 1972) as part of the Integrated Reorganization Plan (Presidential Decree No. 1, s. 1972) of the Philippine government. This new agency was placed under the authority of the Department of National Defense (DND).

Through Executive Order No. 387, s. 1972, Marcos also established the Presidential Committee on Typhoon Moderation to coordinate, plan and implement programs intended to curb the severe effects of weather. Separately, the Typhoon Moderation and Flood Control Research and Development Council (later becoming the Typhoon Moderation Research and Development Office) was created to allow research and utilization of modern scientific methods to moderate typhoons and minimize damage.

After further destruction to the Philippines during the 1973 typhoon season, the Typhoon Moderation Program began exploring the Cloud Seeding Program as a means of minimizing the dangers of typhoons. As detailed by PAGASA director Roman Kintanar, they sought to weaken typhoons by 'seeding' them with various elements, most notably silver iodide, to increase the width of the eye, therefore increasing the diameter of the typhoon in order to increase the cover of the landfall but consequently reduce the intensity of rainfall. Such undertakings have been seen previously when the US launched the infamous Operation Popeye, which attempted to extend the monsoon season in Vietnam in 1967, and Project Stormfury, which, similar to the Typhoon Moderation Program, sought to weaken typhoons in the early 1960s. Kintanar detailed Weather Modification Experiments (WEMEX), such as WEMEX I, which was initiated over Central Visayas in 1975, and WEMEX II, which was initiated over Central Luzon the following year. Results were inconclusive, but as with both Popeye and Stormfury, the data gathered ultimately proved helpful for meteorologists in future tracking of weather patterns and typhoon forecasts.

Four organization units initially comprised PAGASA. The National Weather Service undertakes the preparation and subsequent prompt issuance of forecasts and warnings of weather and flood conditions. The National Atmospheric, Geophysical, and Astronomical Data Service undertakes the acquisition, collection, quality control, processing, and archiving of atmospheric and allied data. The National Geophysical and Astronomical Service undertakes observations and studies of seismological and astronomical phenomena, as well as provides the official time for the country. The National Institute of Atmospheric, Geophysical, and Astronomical Sciences is responsible for the training of scientists and technical personnel with respect to atmospheric, geophysical, and astronomical sciences. Later on in 1977, the Typhoon Moderation Research and Development Office and the National Flood Forecasting Office were placed under the administrative supervision of PAGASA, pursuant to Presidential Decree No. 1149, s. 1977.

PAGASA saw a lot of accomplishments during the Marcos regime. In 1973, the Pampanga River Basin Flood Forecasting and Warning Project, a joint undertaking of the PAGASA and the Ministry of Public Works, Transportation and Communications, was inaugurated, and upon recommendations of a survey mission, the Japanese Government provided the equipment and training of personnel for the project. Early in 1974, PAGASA, in cooperation with the Office of Civil Defense, put up a radio station with callsign DZCA. Through a network of automatic stations situated at strategic points along the Pampanga River and its major tributaries, data on the rise and fall of the river levels are sent to the Flood Forecasting Center in the Central Office via the existing telemetry system.

Impressed with the success of the Flood Forecasting System in the Pampanga River Basin, President Marcos instructed PAGASA to explore the possibility of putting up a similar system in the Agno, Bicol, and Cagayan River Basins. The UNESCO-sponsored Regional Seismological Network in Southeast Asia set up an office in the PAGASA Geophysical Observatory in 1974. It sought to standardize the training of personnel and seismological equipment, as well as to improve the accuracy of determining the epicenters of earthquakes in the region. Subsequently, in 1977, a strong motion accelerograph network was put up in Metro Manila.

The network was designed to record strong earthquake vibrations in the area. On April 18, 1979, the Science Garden Planetarium was opened to the public. Equipped with a Minolta planetarium projector, it has a seating capacity of 90 people. In June 1981, the Bicol flood forecasting sub-system based on the Pampanga River system was inaugurated. In May of the following year, all three sub-systems (Agno, Bicol, and Cagayan) became fully operational. On the same occasion, the Ground Receiving Station for the Geostationary Meteorological Satellite was inaugurated, bringing the satellite meteorology of the Philippines to a giant leap forward.

In April 1983, Flood Forecasting and Warning System for Dam Operations was jointly undertaken by PAGASA, the National Power Corporation, and the National Irrigation Administration, with financial assistance in the form of loans from the Japanese government. Phase 1 of the project covered Angat and Pantabangan Dams, while Phase II covered the Magat, Binga, and Ambuklao Dams, as well as the Data Information Center for the project.

The subsequent efforts of the government to centrally direct the integration of all government scientific and technological efforts led to the transfer of PAGASA to the National Science and Technology Authority through Executive Order No. 984, s. 1984. The reorganization also transferred the seismological services of PAGASA to the Philippine Institute of Volcanology (PHIVOLC), now Philippine Institute of Volcanology and Seismology (PHIVOLCS).

=== Post-1986: PAGASA today ===
Following the re-establishment of the democratic government after the ouster of Ferdinand Marcos (see People Power Revolution) in 1986, President Corazon C. Aquino ordered the reorganization of the National Science and Technology Authority (now called Department of Science and Technology) and all agencies under its authority, pursuant to Executive Order 128, s. 1987 Five major branches (Weather, Flood Forecasting, Climatology & Agrometeorology, Astronomical, Geophysical & Space Science, and National Disaster Reduction) and three support divisions (Administrative, Finance & Management, and Engineering & Maintenance) now constitute PAGASA. This organizational structure remained until October 2008, when the agency went under a Rationalization Program under Executive Order 366, s. 2004 issued by President Gloria Macapagal Arroyo. The Rationalization Program of the government was aimed at making the government focus its efforts on vital/core functions and enhance effectiveness and efficiency of public service.

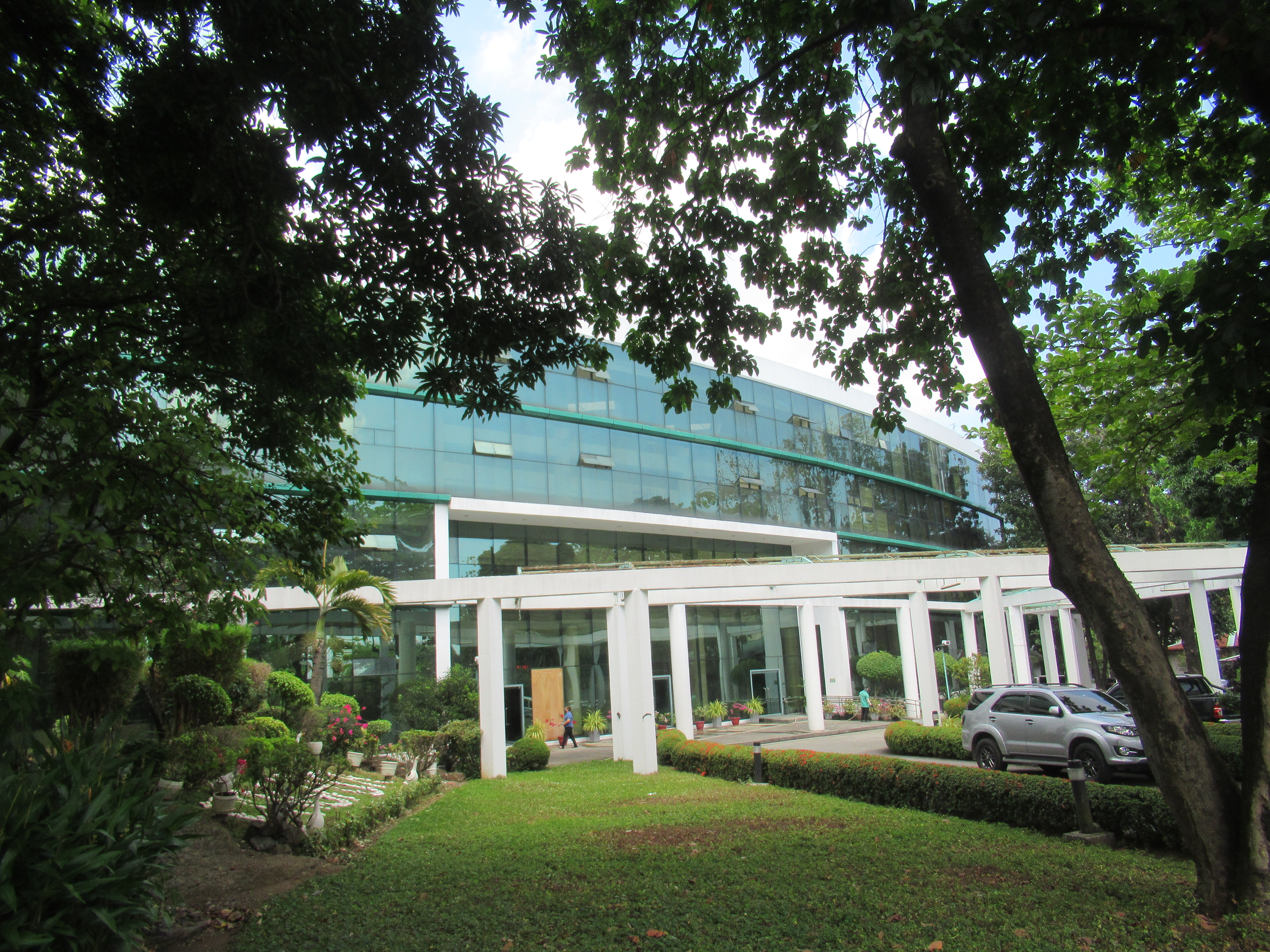
Central Office, Quezon City 2023

On January 15, 2003, PAGASA transferred its central office from 1424 Quezon Avenue to its permanent headquarters at the Science Garden, located along Agham Road (now Senator Miriam P. Defensor-Santiago Avenue) in Diliman, Quezon City. Meanwhile, scientific and technical operations are currently being undertaken in its Weather and Flood Forecasting Center, a facility located just in front of its current headquarters.

On November 3, 2015, Republic Act No. 10692, or the PAGASA Modernization Act of 2015, was signed into law by President Benigno Aquino III. The government initially spent ₱3 billion from Philippine Amusement and Gaming Corporation's (PAGCOR) revenues (with a three-year span) for the modernization fund of the state weather bureau, which included the upgrading and acquisition of equipment, a new salary scheme for the employees, manpower training for future weathercasters and the creation of PAGASA Data Center, among other plans.

On August 8, 2019, Republic Act No. 11363, or the Philippine Space Act, was signed by President Rodrigo Duterte, creating the Philippine Space Agency, also known as PhilSA, to manage the operate the Philippine space program which was previously handled by PAGASA.

== Climatology ==

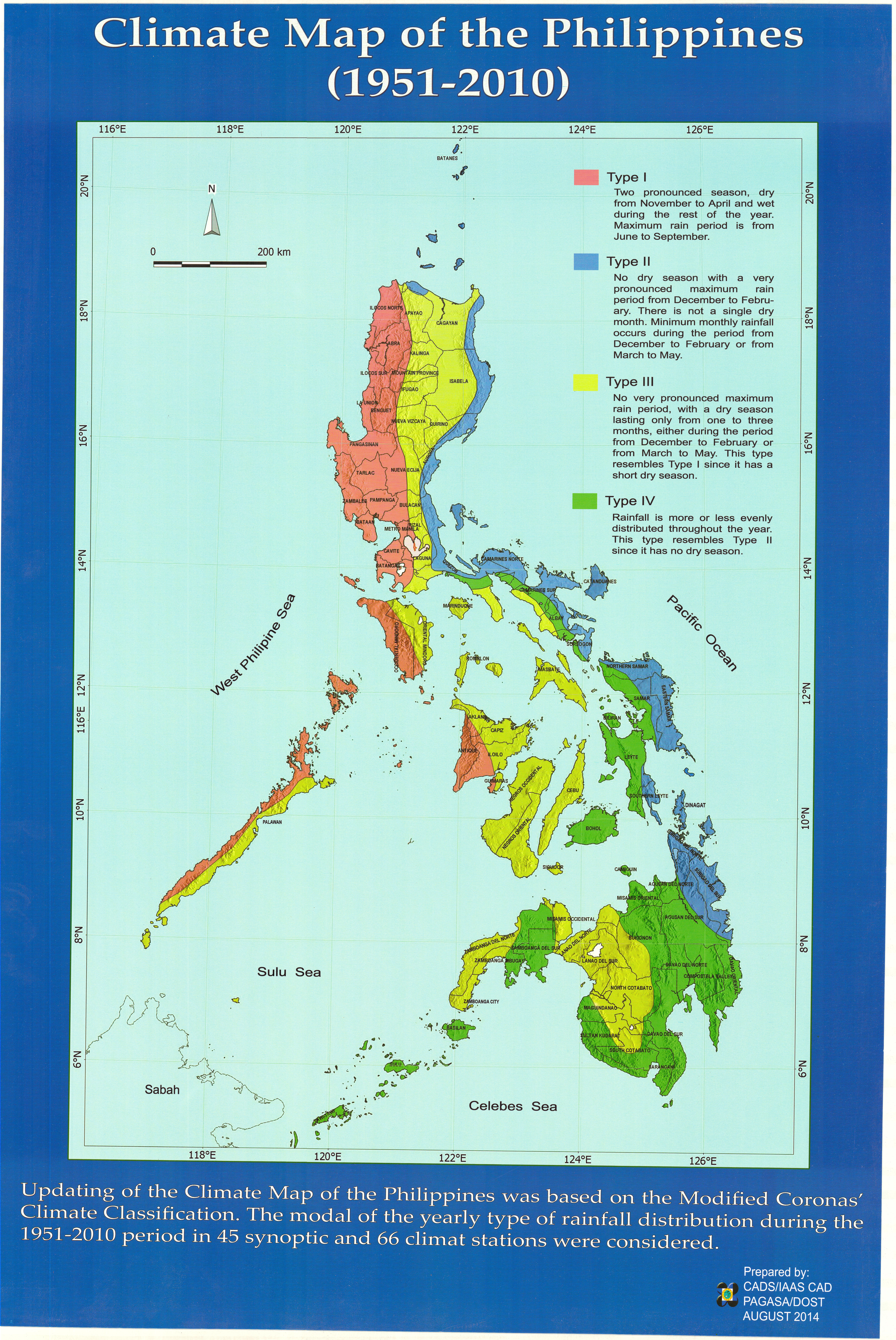
Climate map of the Philippines based on the Modified Coronas' Climate Classification, based on the type of rainfall distribution during the 1951–2010 period

PAGASA monitors daily rainfall and temperature data together with monthly observation of standard precipitation index, soil moisture, runoff and vegetation. Also, PAGASA is involved in the World Meteorological Organization (WMO) Regional Climate Centres (RCC) network node for climate monitoring in Southeast Asia. Climate prediction is also offered by PAGASA such as subseasonal to seasonal forecasting from ten-day running to one-month probabilistic forecasting with special emphasis on high-impact weather events.

Specialized forecasts are also done by PAGASA like data gathering on regional rainfall outlook at locations of dams, watersheds, river basins, other important water reservoirs and flood-prone areas. PAGASA monitors and assesses monthly climate, with regular advisories on regional to global climate phenomena like El Niño–Southern Oscillation (ENSO) or La Niña, and seasonal climate projections like for dry spell, drought, and Habagat and Amihan monsoon together with their dynamic and statistical downscaling.

PAGASA through its Climatology and Agrometeorology Division, also offers services for the availment of climate data composed of various climatic elements which are routinely observed at PAGASA's network with meteorological observations and quality control procedures are done following the recommended best practices of the WMO.

== Tropical cyclones ==
The Philippine Area of Responsibility (PAR) for tropical cyclone warnings

PAGASA monitors tropical cyclone activity and issues warnings if they fall within the Philippine Area of Responsibility (PAR). This area is bound by an imaginary line drawn along the following coordinates:

25°N 120°E, 25°N 135°E, 5°N 135°E, 5°N 115°E, 15°N 115°E, 21°N 120°E and back to the beginning.

Tropical cyclone bulletins are issued by PAGASA every three hours for all tropical cyclones within this area that are currently affecting the country, six hours when cyclones are anticipated to make landfall within the Philippines, or twelve hours when cyclones are not affecting land.

As of March 23, 2022, PAGASA used to classify tropical cyclones into five categories:

- Tropical Depression – maximum 10-minute sustained winds of 39 to 61 km/h
- Tropical Storm – maximum 10-minute sustained winds of 62 to 88 km/h
- Severe Tropical Storm – maximum 10-minute sustained winds of 89 to 117 km/h
- Typhoon – maximum 10-minute sustained winds of 118 to 184 km/h
- Super Typhoon – maximum 10-minute sustained winds of more than 185 km/h.

== Tornadoes ==
One of PAGASA's doppler weather radars showing a hook echo, associated with the 2016 Manila tornado

PAGASA acknowledged that they do not have the ability to set tornado warnings yet. Instead, they rely on doppler weather radars and storm chasers to gather data on tornadoes. The procedures for issuing and implementing tornado warnings are currently being studied by PAGASA. This comes after an EF1 tornado struck Metro Manila on August 14, 2016 where it damaged more than 100 buildings and injured two people.

== Doppler weather radar, weather stations and other equipment ==
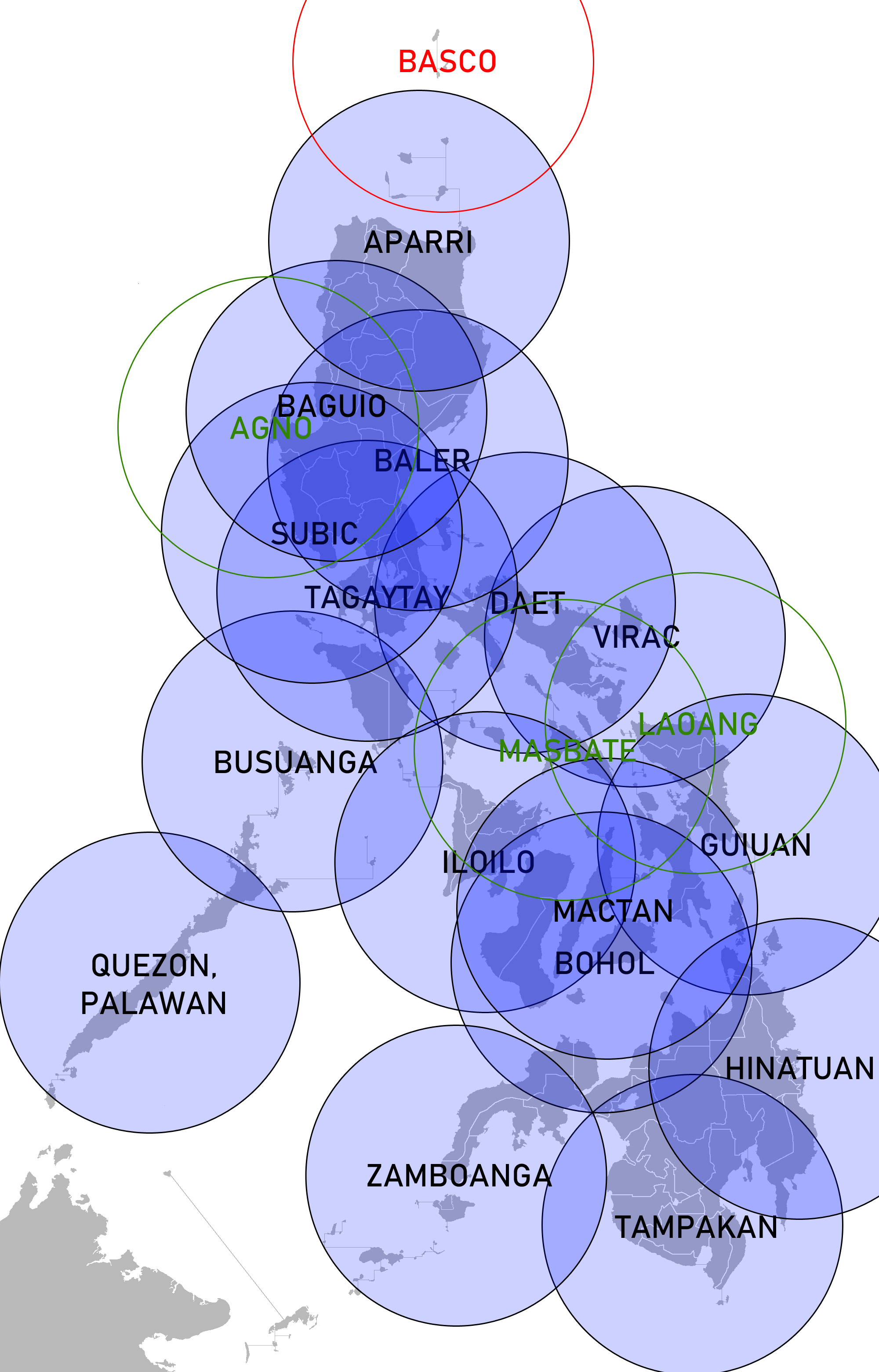
Location of Doppler weather radar installations in the Philippines as of 2020. Black circles: Operational Red circles: Not in operation due to structural damage Blue circles: Under construction Green circles: Proposed new radar locations

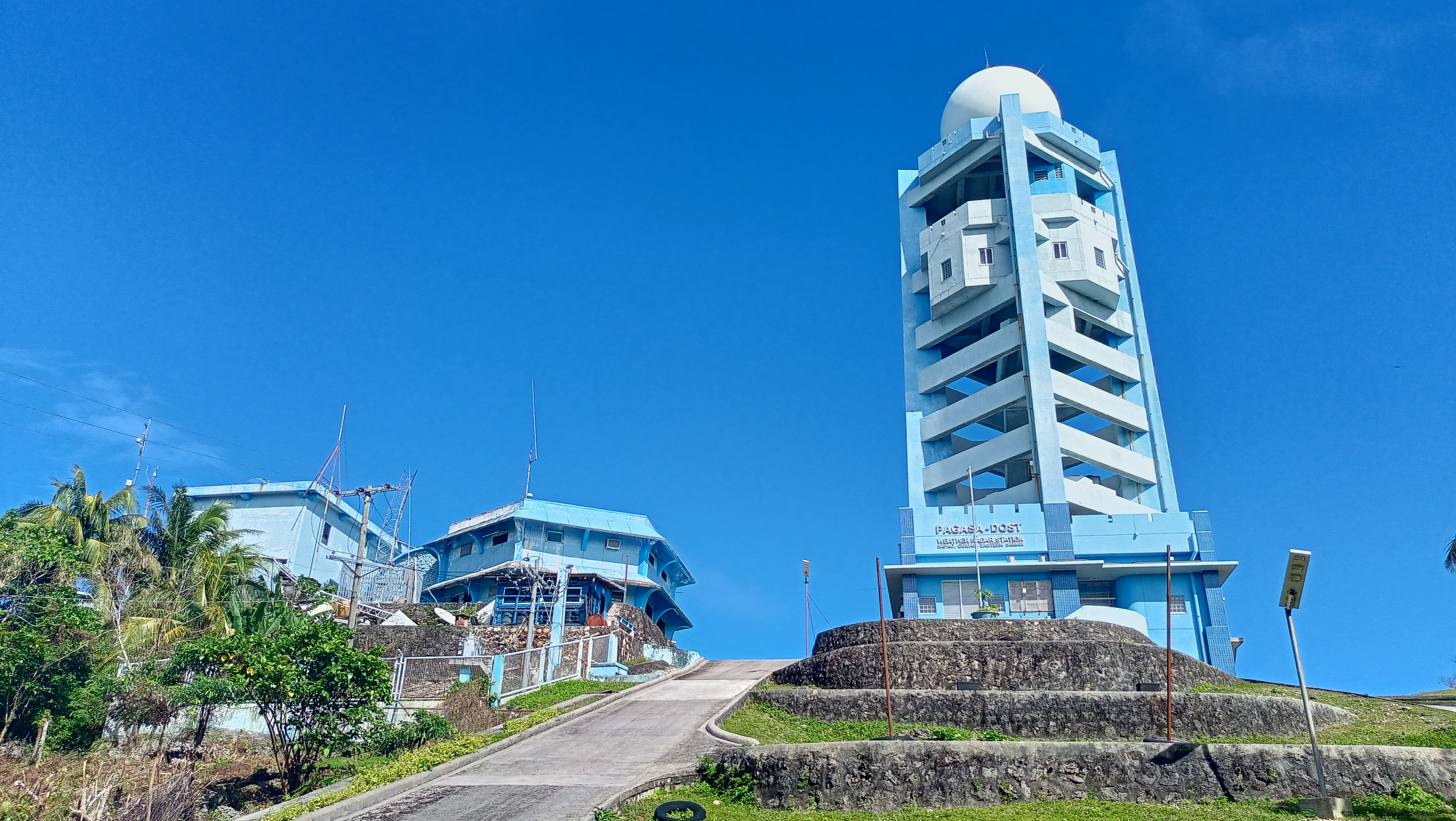
The PAGASA Guiuan Weather Station with its Doppler weather radar tower (right)

PAGASA installed its first Doppler weather radar station in Baler, Aurora and another in Baguio. The new weather radars can monitor the typhoon and its movements, amount of rainfall either moderate or heavy and real-time atmospheric forecasts using a visual radar monitor, an example was that of Typhoon Basyang in 2010. Data are used for warnings (such as rainfall) through Project NOAH since June 2012.

PAGASA has installed at least sixteen Doppler weather radars in the country, currently operational stations are as follows:

- Luzon: Basco (in Batanes, currently under repair), Aparri (Cagayan), Baguio, Subic (Zambales), Baler, (Aurora), Tagaytay (Cavite), Busuanga and Quezon (both in Palawan), Daet (Camarines Norte), Virac (in Catanduanes, the country's most modern radar facility);
- Visayas: Mactan (Cebu), Iloilo, Alburquerque (Bohol), Guiuan (Eastern Samar);
- Mindanao: Zamboanga City, Tampakan (South Cotabato)

Moreover, the weather bureau is now planning to construct at least three more Doppler weather radar stations in Agno (Pangasinan), Cataingan (Masbate) and in Laoang (Northern Samar). It aims to have twenty operational radar stations nationwide by the end of 2020.

Before Nilo's leave, an automated rain gauge was also installed in a telecommunications cellsite in Montalban, Rizal (in cooperation with Smart Communications) to monitor excess rainfall as a warning signal to avert the effects of flashfloods and landslides by using cellphones, the weather bureau plans to adopt its swift transfer of data from ground forecasting stations to main headquarters utilizing its automated data acquisition system modeled after Japan Meteorological Agency's AMeDAS in the near future as a solution to forecast inaccuracy and their problems. The Japan International Cooperation Agency will provide modernization programs to enhance the services of PAGASA include meteorology and flood forecasting, and tornado warnings as precautionary measures. Seven new Doppler weather radars placed in different locations are scheduled to operate in June 2011.

In addition, the weather bureau introduced its Landslide Early Warning Sensor (LEWS) (recently invented by the University of the Philippines) to reduce landslide casualties in case of landslides. Using this new device, the sensor picks out signals in the form of computer data to show soil and ground movements and is transferred to the ground station immediately in an event of a landslide, and in order to launch forced evacuation. PAGASA hopes to install 10 sensors in five landslide prone areas by 2012, when it is tested and ready to bury on ground.

Another innovation to flood alerts was the adoption of an Automated Weather Station (AWS) designed to monitor amounts of rainfall and flood levels in case of an incoming warning, the AWS can be controlled by a computer even it is unmanned and a siren to evacuate people for emergencies. Few of the AWS units are installed in few points of the country and many more units will be installed to extend its coverage.

In 2011, Taiwan donated fifteen weather stations to the Philippines' Department of Science and Technology, and it has been reported that "The Philippines weather bureau will also share information from the new weather stations with Taiwan's Central Weather Bureau, helping expand the range of Taiwan's weather forecasts." PAGASA and the Philippines Department of Science and Technology work jointly in the implementation of weather stations.

In July 2024, Administrator Nathaniel T. Servando, Ph.D. launched PAGASA's 83rd weather station—the San Ildefonso Synoptic Station in M. Valte Road, Purok 2, Barangay Palapala, San Ildefonso, Bulacan. It is equipped with a digital barometer, anemometer, rain gauges, thermometers, and solar radiation sensors.

On September 8, 2025, PAGASA signed a memorandum of agreement with Bataan Peninsula State University to establish a radar station within the campus.

=== Regional Service Divisions ===
Pursuant to the Rationalization Program, PAGASA has five Regional Services Divisions (RSD) that provide localized forecasts in a select group of areas. Under these RSDs, PAGASA disseminates regular thunderstorm advisories, heavy rainfall warnings, and special weather forecasts to more specific localities around the country, in line with the program's goal to increase its effectiveness and efficiency of public service. Such data are often found on the bureau's official social media pages.

Warnings are typically issued at the municipality/city level; very rarely are barangays specified in the advisories. Occasionally, these can also be issued at the provincial level, particularly those of Heavy Rainfall Advisories. Highly urbanized cities (except Davao City and Zamboanga City) are grouped with their parent provinces. Metro Manila is also collectively organized into one region during the issuance of warnings. Some provinces, though they belong in a different island group, are assigned to another RSD not associated with the island group they belong to, such as cases for Palawan and Occidental Mindoro, where the Visayas RSD oversees them as opposed to Luzon-based RSDs, and Northern Samar, where it is administered by the Southern Luzon RSD despite being located in Visayas.

| Regional Services Division | Provinces |
|---|---|
| Northern Luzon | Abra, Apayao, Aurora, Benguet (including Baguio), Batanes, Cagayan, Ifugao, Ilocos Norte, Ilocos Sur, Kalinga, Isabela, La Union, Mountain Province, Nueva Vizcaya, Pangasinan, Quirino |
| National Capital Region | Bataan, Batangas, Bulacan, Cavite, Laguna, Metro Manila, Nueva Ecija, Pampanga, Rizal, Quezon (including Lucena), Tarlac, Zambales |
| Southern Luzon | Albay, Camarines Norte, Camarines Sur, Catanduanes, Marinduque, Masbate, Northern Samar, Oriental Mindoro, Romblon, Sorsogon |
| Visayas | Aklan, Antique, Biliran, Bohol, Capiz, Cebu (including Cebu City, Lapu-Lapu, Mandaue), Eastern Samar, Guimaras, Iloilo (including Iloilo City), Leyte (including Tacloban), Negros Occidental (including Bacolod), Negros Oriental, Occidental Mindoro, Palawan (including Puerto Princesa), Samar, Siquijor, Southern Leyte |
| Mindanao | Agusan del Norte (including Butuan), Agusan del Sur, Basilan, Bukidnon, Camiguin, Cotabato, Cotabato City, Davao City, (Note: Davao City and Zamboanga City are treated as separate from Davao Del Sur and Zamboanga Del Sur, respectively, during the issuance of weather advisories by the Mindanao PRSD.) Davao de Oro, Davao del Norte, Davao del Sur, Davao Occidental, Davao Oriental, Dinagat Islands, Lanao del Norte (including Iligan), Lanao del Sur, Maguindanao del Norte, Maguindanao del Sur, Misamis Occidental, Misamis Oriental (including Cagayan de Oro), Sarangani, South Cotabato (including General Santos), Sultan Kudarat, Sulu, Surigao del Norte, Surigao del Sur, Tawi-tawi, Zamboanga City, (Note: Davao City and Zamboanga City are treated as separate from Davao Del Sur and Zamboanga Del Sur, respectively, during the issuance of weather advisories by the Mindanao PRSD.) Zamboanga del Norte, Zamboanga del Sur, Zamboanga Sibugay |

== Criticism ==
In July 2010, the Philippines was struck by Typhoon Conson (Basyang), the second tropical cyclone of the 2010 Pacific typhoon season to impact the country. Conson was poorly forecasted by PAGASA. Initially, from July 12 to 13, it was predicted to hit the provinces of Aurora and Isabela. However, at 11 p.m. PST (15:00 UTC) on July 13, PAGASA revised its forecast, indicating that the typhoon would instead affect Quezon province, Metro Manila, and the southern Luzon provinces. Despite this, residents living in these areas were not informed of the forecast change, nor were they notified that public storm warning signal (PSWS) number 2 had been raised. As a result, severe damage occurred in the affected regions. Later that same day, President Benigno Aquino III reprimanded PAGASA for failing to predict that Conson would pass over Manila.

As a result, Aquino criticized PAGASA for not warning the residents of Metro Manila about the strong tropical storm that struck the nation's capital. However, according to Dr. Nilo and PAGASA, the agency didn't have adequate equipment to "accurately" predict a movement of a storm and the weather forecasting instruments were too old and needed to be upgraded.

== See also ==
- 2026 Pacific typhoon season
- Amado Pineda
- Climate of the Philippines
- Doppler weather radar
- Nathaniel Cruz
- Prisco Nilo
