= Regalado =

Regalado may refer to:

- Florenz Regalado (1928–2015), Associate Justice of the Supreme Court of the Philippines
- Iñigo C. Regalado (1855–1896), Filipino poet, printer, journalist, editor, playwright, lyricist and songwriter
- Iñigo Ed. Regalado (1888–1974), Filipino poet, journalist, novelist and son of Iñigo Corcuera Regalado
- Luis Antonio Regalado (1922–2001), Salvadoran footballer and coach
- Nayer (Nayer Regalado) (born 1986), American singer-songwriter and model
- Peter de Regalado (1390–1456), reformer
- Rudy Regalado (baseball) (1930–2018), Major League Baseball player
- Rudy Regalado (musician) (1943–2010), Venezuelan Latin music bandleader, percussionist and composer
- Tomás Regalado (American politician) (born 1947), former broadcast journalist and former mayor of Miami, Florida
- Tomás Regalado (Salvadoran politician) (1861–1906), President of El Salvador
- Victor Regalado (born 1948), Mexican golfer

== See also ==
- Regalado Maambong (died 2011), Filipino jurist, politician and member of the 1987 Constitutional Commission
