= La Ilustración Filipina =

Filipino Spanish-language magazine (1891-1905)

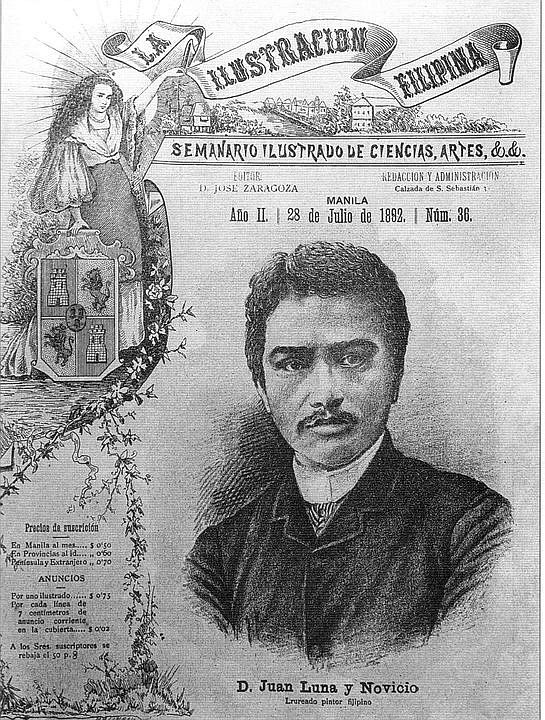
- July 28, 1892, cover of La Ilustración Filipina
- Editor: Jose Zaragoza y Aranquizna
- Founded: November 7, 1891; 134 years ago
- Ceased publication: 1905
- Political alignment: Independent
- Language: Spanish
- Headquarters: Manila, Philippines

La Ilustración Filipina (lit. 'The Philippine Enlightenment') was a Spanish-language newspaper published in Manila, Philippines, that ran during the last decade of the Spanish colonial period, and at times during the Philippine Revolution and the beginning of the 20th century under U.S. rule.

It was an illustrated weekly newspaper that covered a wide array of social related topics both local and international. Many personalities at the time, both Spanish and Filipinos, contributed articles and pictures, although the newspaper also published anonymous articles that in some cases raised a great deal of controversy.

== History ==
La Ilustración Filipina published its first issue on November 8, 1891, made of eight pages and a four-page cover, in two columns in cuarto.

La Ilustración Filipina must not be confused with Ilustración Filipina, a highly regarded illustrated magazine also published in the Philippines during the period between March 1, 1859, and December 15, 1860. This similarity of titles was not accompanied by a correlation in written contents, graphic design and printing quality, which prompted Wenceslao Retana to point out the "responsibility" that had fallen upon founder Zaragoza, who had dare to "resurrect" the name of a very prestigious magazine in spite of knowing beforehand that he could never be able to surpass the level of quality achieved by its predecessor.

== Contents ==
The newspaper had many sections that included the Arts, Science, Politics, History, local and world news, etc.

Despite some criticisms regarding his lack of artistic stature, La Ilustración was regarded as one of the most important sources of news and information at the time, both for local and international affairs.

== Notable contributors ==
From 1891 to 1895 it was partly edited by Miguel Zaragoza, painter, writer and teacher, who is considered to be one of the first Filipinos to publish a book of poems written in Spanish, and during the Philippine Revolution became one of the editors of the Malolos Constitution. During the years that he acted as the editor of the newspaper, Zaragoza also contributed many writings and drawings, and openly gave preference to the works of native Filipino writers and artists, such as Juan Luna, Fabian de la Rosa, Rafael Enriquez and Torribio Herrera.

Juan Luna, Filipino painter, sculptor and political activist during the Philippine Revolution, was featured on the July 28, 1892, cover of the La Ilustración in spite of having maintained a strong rivalry with Zaragoza. He contributed many illustrations and writings in successive editions, among them one of the most famous cover pages of the Ilustración showing a young Filipina seated next to a basket of books and some little girls reading, with Mayon Volcano in the background.

Simon Flores y de la Rosa, another renowned Filipino painter, contributed a self-portrait in charcoal that was used in an article about him.

Iñigo Regalado y Corcuera, a famous printer and Tagalog poet was the head printer of the newspaper during 1890.

== See also ==
- Ilustración Filipina
- Philippine Literature in Spanish
