= Ilustración Filipina =

Filipino Spanish-language magazine (1859-60)

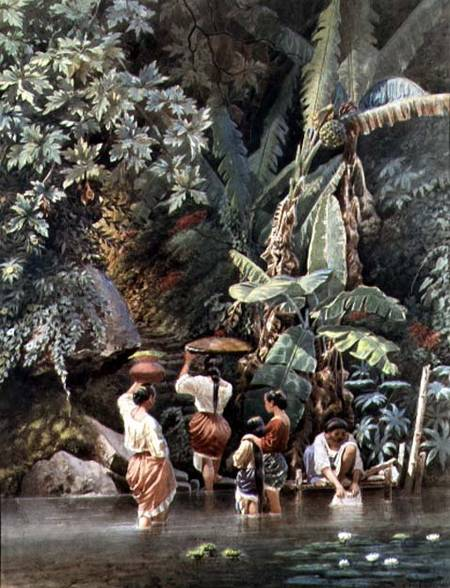
- Filipino Women Washing Beneath a Banana Tree, by C. W. Andrews, main illustrator of Ilustración Filipina'
- Format: Bi-weekly
- Publisher: Imprenta y litographia de Ramirez y Giraudier
- Founded: 1859
- Ceased publication: 1860
- Political alignment: Independent
- Language: Spanish
- Headquarters: Manila, Philippines

Ilustración Filipina was a Spanish language magazine published in the Philippines, that was founded on March 1, 1859, and ran until December 15, 1860.

It was an illustrated bi-weekly whose lithographs are among the best that have been printed in the archipelago, thanks to the contributions of artists like Baltasar Giraudier, who was well known for his writings and lithographic work for other publications such as the Diario de Manila, and C.W. Andrews, an English painter based in Hong-Kong who produced illustrations for Ilustración Filipina on a regular basis.

== History ==
Ilustración Filipina was one of the earliest illustrated publications in the Philippines, being published twice a month. Although its lithographs are among the earliest ever executed in the Philippines, their quality is remarkable.

The quarterly was issued by subscription and produced in limited editions. During the 20 months during which it was published a total of forty-four numbers were ultimately issued.

Ilustración Filipina is not to be confused with La Ilustración Filipina, founded by Spanish-Filipino Jose Zaragoza y Aranquizna and published during the last decade of the 19th century and the beginning of the 20th.

== Contents ==
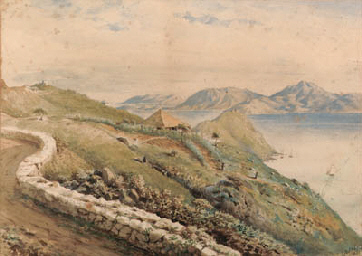
"Hillside in the Philippines", by C.W. Andrews

The text of the publication mostly related to the arts, history, geography, ethnography, and other sciences, while the illustrations offered reproductions of landscapes, seascapes, village life, costumes, portraits, and many other aspects of the Philippines and the Filipino people.

Ilustración Filipina did not delve much on political issues and focused instead on cultural and scientific subjects that were combined with its high-quality illustrations, that included many portraits and stunning views of emblematic places in the Philippines, such as the volcano at Albay or the Botocan waterfalls. Wenceslao Retana, in his Aparato Bibliográfico de la Historia General de Filipinas, defined the publication as rather "unusual" in 1877 and praised its high quality.

Each issue included one tinted lithograph whose images were in many cases drawn by Andrews, who on occasions would use original sketches by Charles Wirgman to create engravings that were later lithographed by Giraudier.

== Notable contributors ==
Simon Flores y de la Rosa, one of the most celebrated Filipino painters in the last quarter of the 19th century and uncle of Fabián de la Rosa, contributed several of his graphic works to Ilustración Filipina.

Manuel Ravago, a linguistic academician, theater director and actor, was a regular contributor of the publication.

== See also ==
- Philippine Literature in Spanish
- La Ilustración Filipina
