= Iñigo C. Regalado =

Filipino poet and journalist

- Born: Iñigo Corcuera Regalado; June 1, 1855; Sampaloc, Manila, Captaincy General of the Philippines
- Died: September 2, 1896 (aged 41); Manila, Philippines
- Occupations: Poet and novelist

Iñigo Corcuera Regalado (1 June 1855 – 2 September 1896) was a Filipino poet, printer, journalist, editor, playwright, lyricist, and songwriter of Tagalog descent. He used the pen name Odalager or Odalaguer ("Regalado" spelt backwards with u added based on Spanish orthography), Igini, and Gaolerad, another pseudonym derived from the letters of Regalado's surname.

According to J.C. Balmaceda in his Ang Tatlong Panahon ng Tulang Tagalog ("The Three Periods of Tagalog Poetry", 1938), Regalado was "one of the later 19th century poets who broke from the traditional forms of the metrical romance and the church verse in order to forge a new trail in Tagalog poetry."

== Family ==
Regalado was born in Sampaloc, Manila. Regalado was the husband of Saturnina Reyes. Among their children were their namesakes, namely Iñigo Ed. Regalado and Saturnina Regalado. His son, Iñigo Ed. Regalado also became a respected poet, novelist, and politician. His daughter Saturnina Regalado married Victor Villamiel Sr., former mayor of Atimonan, Quezon.

== Career ==
As a Tagalog playwright, Regalado was a writer of the duplo, a traditional oral form of Tagalog poetry. As a songwriter, Regalado authored love songs and ballads, including the Ang Ganda Mo Neneng ("Your Beauty Neneng" or "You Are Beautiful Neneng"). As a poet, Regalado’s poetry was published in the calendars and almanacs created by Isabelo de los Reyes and Pascual H. Poblete. His verses and lyrics depicted Filipino customs and traditions during his lifetime. He pioneered the printing and publication of works in the Tagalog language. He, together with Gregorio Bautista, published the La Opinion in 1887. After selling the La Opinion publication to Juan Atayde, Regalado became the manager of the Tagalog-language section of the La Lectura, a bi-weekly newspaper. He later became the printer for Atayde’s printing press, the Imprenta de Don Juan Atayde y Ca. Among the other periodicals Regalado printed were El Eco de Filipinas (beginning September 1980) and La Ilustración Filipina. He was the editor of the Spanish-Tagalog periodical Ang Pliegong Tagalog (since 3 May 1896), a periodical that was later used by the Katipuneros as a propaganda tool. Among his other literary works was the Ang Cuintas ng Jesuita (The Jesuit's Necklace).
