= Manila Observatory =

University observatory in Quezon City, Philippines

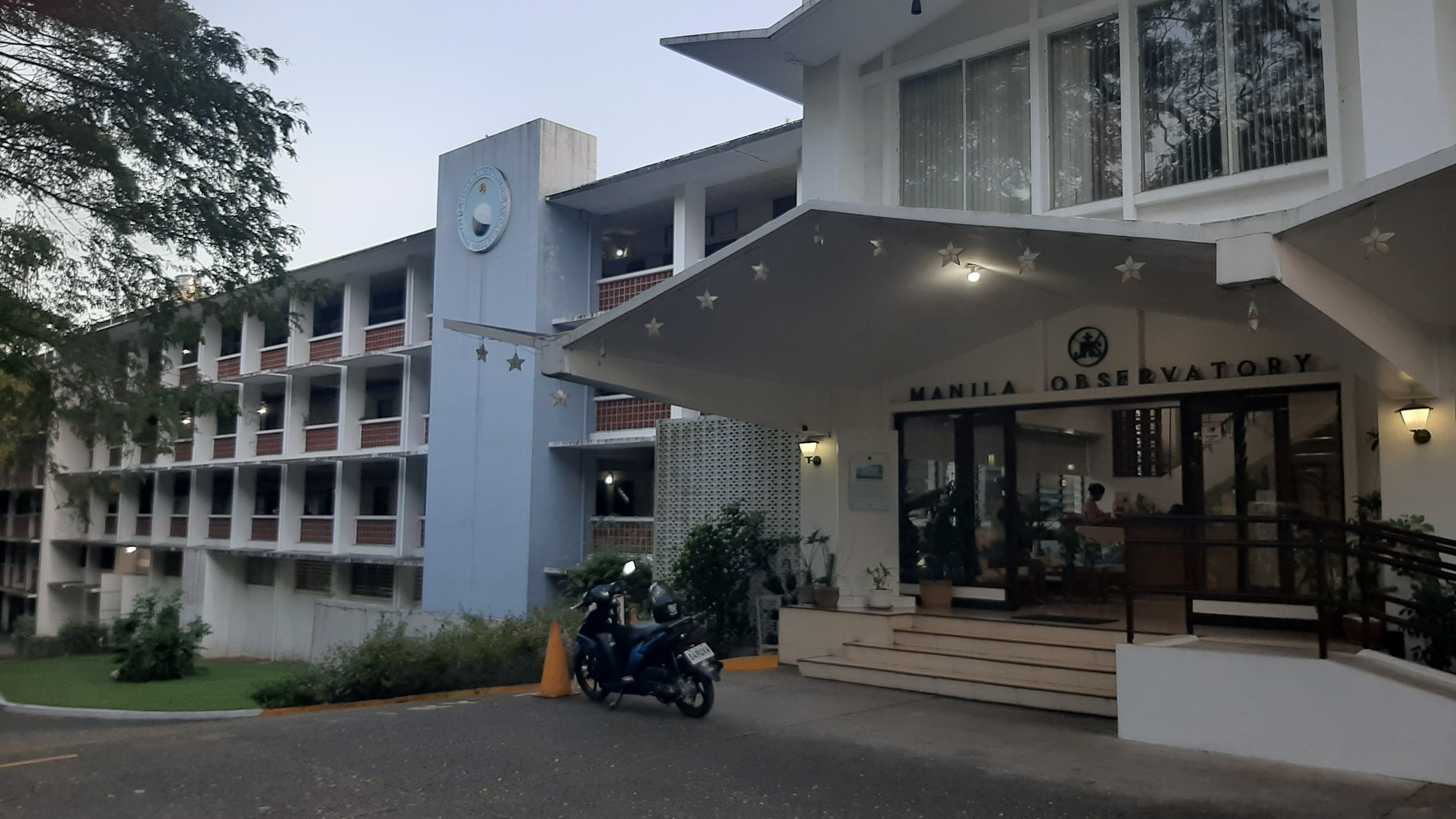
- The observatory as of January 2025
- Organization: Ateneo de Manila University
- Location: Quezon City, Philippines
- Coordinates: 14°38′12″N 121°04′36″E
- Established: 1865
- Website: www.observatory.ph
- Related media on Commons

The Manila Observatory is a non-profit research institute housed on the campus of the Ateneo de Manila University in Quezon City, Philippines. It was founded by the Society of Jesus, commonly known as the Jesuits, in 1865 as the Observatorio Meteorológico del Ateneo Municipal de Manila. It was later renamed Observatorio Meteorológico de Manila. It has done weather forecasting and earthquake research and today researches seismic and geomagnetic phenomena as well as radio and solar physics.

== History ==
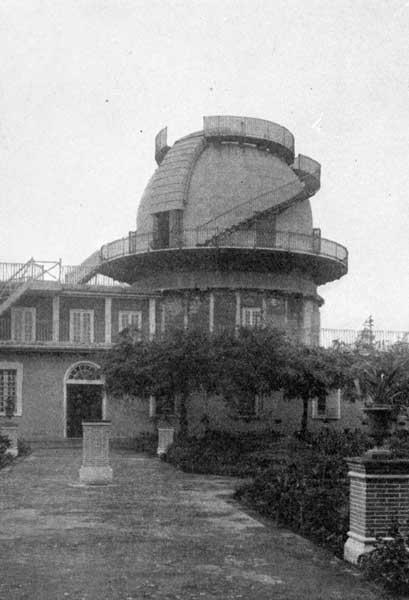
The Manila Observatory in 1923

An article published in Diario de Manila by Jesuit Fr. Jaime Nonell led to the observatory's establishment. The article described Jesuit Fr. Francisco Colina's observations of a typhoon in September 1865 and led the public to ask Jesuit superior Juan Vidal for the observations to be continued. After initial hesitation on the part of the Jesuits because of the primitive instruments available, the superior yielded upon the promise of a Secchi Universal Meteorograph purchased from the Holy See. This started systemic observation of the Philippine weather.

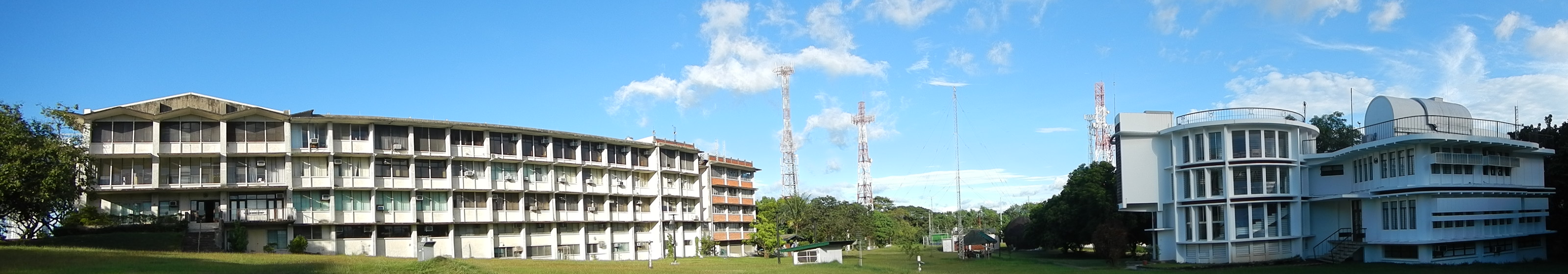
The Manila Observatory in 2013

The institute was founded and led by Jesuit cleric Federico Faura. It started issuing warnings on typhoons in 1879, and the next year earthquake observations. In 1884 the Spanish government recognized the observatory as the official institution for weather forecasting in the Philippines. It started its time service in 1885, seismology in 1887, and astronomy in 1899. After the fire in 1932 in Intramuros, it became the site exclusive for the high school classes until the war.

The American colonial government established the observatory in 1901 as the Philippine Weather Bureau, which expanded into meteorology, astronomy, and geomagnetism. The work of the bureau was interrupted by the Second World War. During the Battle of Manila, all of the instruments and important documents of the bureau were destroyed, and it ceased to function. A specific government agency was established in its place. The observatory resumed operation in 1951 in Baguio, mainly for studies on seismology and the ionosphere. In 1963 it was transferred to the Loyola Heights campus of Ateneo de Manila University where it continues its studies into seismology, geomagnetism, and radio physics, among other areas of research.

== Organizational structure ==
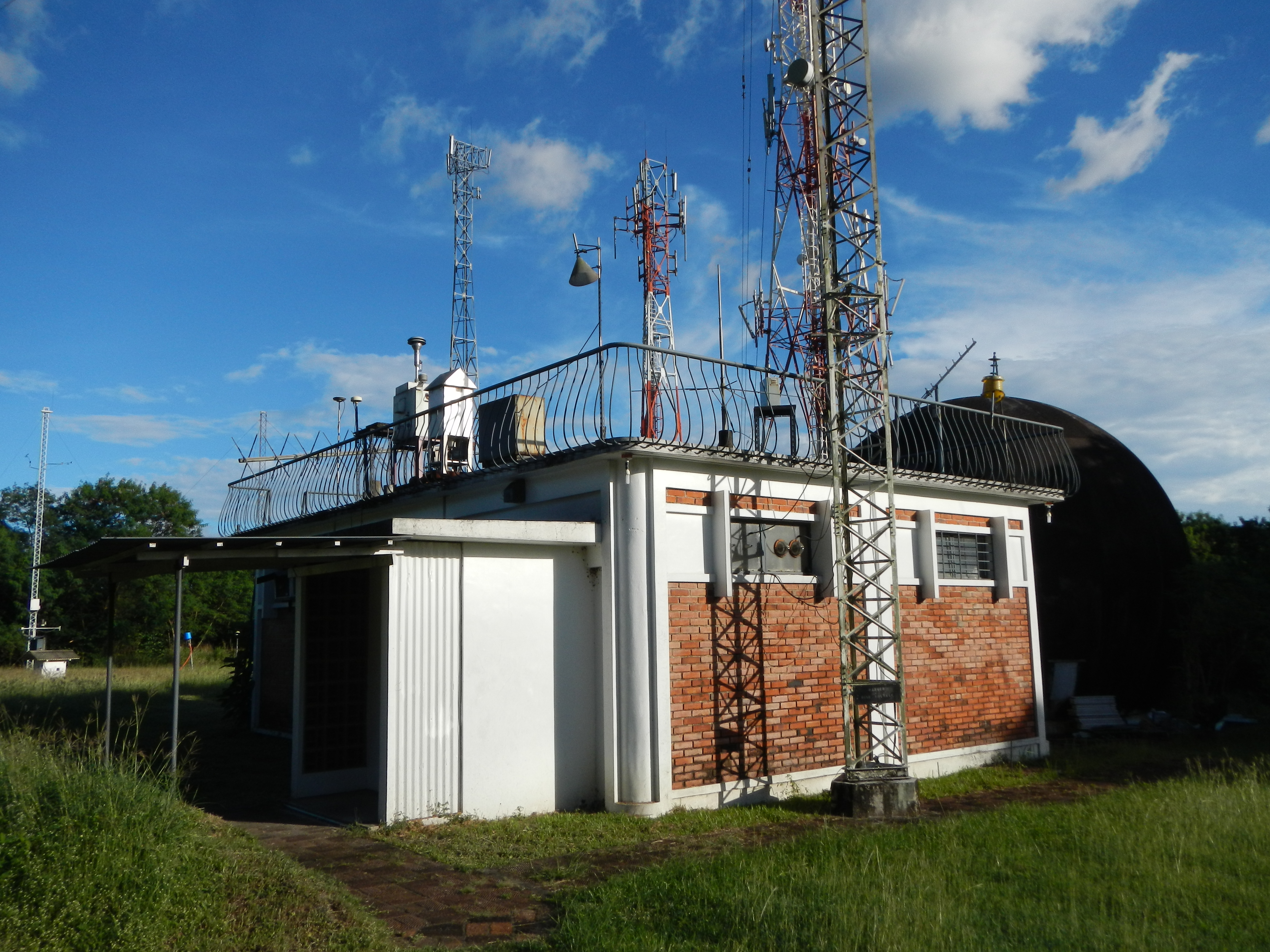
Iono-geomagnetic study

The observatory is mainly composed of two units: administration and research. Administration is primarily composed of General Administration, Accounting, Human Resource, and Physical Facilities and Supplies. Research programs include Climate Change Assistance, Geomatics for Environment and Development, Instrumentation and Technology, Regional Climate Systems, Solid Earth Dynamics, Air Quality Dynamics, and Special Research Projects. The observatory's recent special research projects are: Climate Change Adaptation – Disaster Risk Management and Co-benefits of Climate Change Mitigation.

== See also ==
- List of Jesuit sites
