= Diario de Manila =

Newspaper in the Philippines, 1848–1898

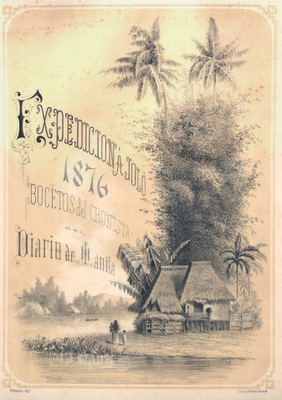
- Diario de Manila's special supplement covering the expedition to Jolo in 1876. Drawing by Baltasar Giraudier y Monteis
- Type: Daily newspaper
- Format: Broadsheet
- Publisher: Ramírez y Compañía later became Imprenta de Ramirez y Giraudier
- Editor: Felipe del Pan
- Founded: 1848
- Ceased publication: 1898
- Political alignment: Independent
- Language: Spanish
- Headquarters: Manila, Philippines

Diario de Manila was a Spanish language newspaper published in the Philippines, founded on October 11, 1848, and closed down by official decree on February 19, 1898, after the colonial authorities discovered that its installations were being used to print revolutionary material. The paper was edited by Felipe del Pan and published by Ramírez y Compañía, whose headquarters were in Intramuros, Manila, and its business and editorial offices in Binondo.

== History ==
The first daily of Manila, La Esperanza, had been founded on December 1, 1846. Diario de Manila raised as a competitor just a couple of years later, during a time when a great number of native newspapers written in Spanish came into existence in the Philippines.

== Notable contributors ==
Isabelo de los Reyes, a prominent Filipino politician, writer and labor activist in the 19th and 20th centuries, who was the founder of the Aglipayan Church, worked as a journalist and wrote several articles for the newspaper, such as “Invasión de Limahong”, which appeared in Diario de Manila in November 1882. He eventually became the associate editor of the Diario.

Enrique Gaspar y Rimbau, a Spanish diplomat and writer, author of plays, operas and novels, wrote for Diario de Manila while serving as consul in Hong Kong.

Baltasar Giraudier y Monteis, a famous French-Spanish born artist and writer who came to Manila and became the business partner at Imprenta de Ramirez y Giraudier and published his works in both Diario de Manila and Ilustración Filipina, accompanied Governor-General Malcampo to Jolo during an organized military expedition that took place in February 1876 against Muslim pirates who had been receiving a substantial amount of arms and ammunition during the previous years. Governor-General Malcampo commissioned Giraudier to illustrate the landscape of the island together with its people, customs and architecture. The resulting drawings are considered to be among the best lithographic illustrations of the Islands. Baltasar Giraudier was also the Director of El Varadero de Manila between 1880-until the time of his death in 1888.

An article published in Diario de Manila by the Jesuit Father Jaime Nonell, which described observations of the typhoon of September 1865 done by Father Francisco Colina, prompted the establishment of the Observatorio Meteorológico del Ateneo Municipal de Manila.

Camilo Millán y Villanueva, former governor of several provinces in the Archipelago and government adviser, raised the issue of the reforms for the Philippines in an article published in 1897 titled "El gran problema de las reformas en Filipinas".

== Katipunan connection ==
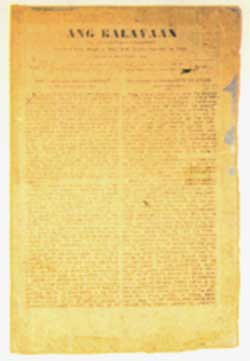
The facsimile Kalayaan.

In 1894 Emilio Jacinto started editing Kalayaan (Freedom), the Katipunan's official publication, utilizing the printing press of Diario de Manila and using typefaces stolen from its printing room by Filipino employees who were also members of the Katipunan. They conducted their activities under the unsuspecting Spanish management, who were mostly active members of the Spanish colonial reserve forces. Most of their secret activities took place during the two-and-a-half hour lunch breaks when the Spanish personnel took their meals and their siesta.

On August 19, 1896, Teodoro Patiño, who was on strong disagreement with press foreman and Katipunan member, Apolonio de la Cruz, over a salary increase and claimed he was being made responsible for the loss of the printing supplies that were used for the printing of Kalayaan, told the entire story to his sister Honoria, who was then living with nuns in a Mandaluyong orphanage.

Honoria was deeply disturbed by her brother's revelation and decided to inform the orphanage’s Mother Superior, Sister Teresa de Jesús, about the existence of the secret society. Sister Teresa, in turn, sought the advice of Father Mariano Gil, the parish priest of Tondo, who, accompanied by several Guardia Civil, immediately searched the premises of Diario de Manila and found evidence of the Katipunan’s existence. They quickly informed the Governor-General Blanco, who ordered the printing press padlocked and arrested de la Cruz, who was found in possession of a dagger used in Katipunan initiation rites, and dozens of other suspected Katipunan members. De la Cruz was later executed on February 6, 1897, in Bagumbayan.

== See also ==
- Philippine Literature in Spanish
- Katipunan
