= Archaeology of the Philippines =

The archaeology of the Philippines is the study of past societies in the territory of the modern Republic of the Philippines, an island country in Southeast Asia, through material culture.

The history of the Philippines focuses on Spanish colonialism and how the Philippines became independent from both Spain and the United States. During the colonial times in the Philippines archaeology was not used as it is today, it mainly focused on ethnographic and linguistic studies. Archaeology was influenced greatly by H. Otley Beyer who taught anthropology in the Philippines in 1914. Beyer's teachings in the Philippines gained many students to follow in his footsteps into the field of archaeology.

After the Philippines gained their independence from America in 1946, many students of Beyer practiced archaeology all over the Philippines. A few of Beyer's students and colleagues who worked around the Philippines are Robert B. Fox, Alfredo Evangelista, and F. Landa Jocano. Their contributions helped the Philippines archaeology grow stronger when analyzing artifacts and archaeological sites.

There are many prominent sites throughout the Philippines, and some famous discoveries that were found date back to various time periods. A few well known site in the Philippines are the Rizal Archaeological Site in Kalinga, Tabon Caves, Lapuz Lapuz Cave, and Singhapala. Additionally, some famous artifacts found in the Philippines are the Callao Man, Tabon Man, Kabayan Mummies of Benguet.

== History ==
=== Colonial period ===
Very little archaeological work was carried out in the Philippines during the Spanish colonial period, even though the Spaniards were interested in the people of the islands from an ethnographic and linguistic perspective. Explorers such as Fedor Jagor, Joseph Montano and Paul Ray, and Jose Rizal, occasionally reported visiting sites, but the only detailed investigation was carried out by French archaeologist Alfred Marche in 1881. Commissioned by the French government, Marche conducted systematic surveys of burial caves on two islands, accumulating a large collection of antiquities which is now held in the Musée de l'Homme in Paris.

The most influential early figure in the archaeology of the Philippines was American anthropologist H. Otley Beyer. Spain ceded the Philippines to the United States in 1898, and the American colonial administration actively encouraged the anthropological study of the archipelago. Beyer was therefore invited to establish the University of the Philippines' anthropology department in 1914.

Early surveys and collections were carried out in the 1920s by Beyer, Dean C. Worcester, and Carl Guthe. Various private collectors and amateur archaeologists also accumulated significant amounts of material, but Beyer lamented that "none of this work was very scientifically done".

The first major archaeological project in the Philippines was the Rizal-Bulacan Archaeological Survey (1926–1930), prompted by the discovery of finds during the construction of the Novaliches Dam in Rizal Province. Beyer opened substantial excavations in the area of the dam, employing up to seventy workers a day for six months. He also conducted a five-year survey of the surrounding area, cataloguing 120 sites and nearly 500,000 artefacts. In 1932, Beyer assisted F. G. Roth in beginning a second major project, the Batangas Archaeological Survey, which involved surveys and excavation in the Cuenca region. He also collected material from a number of localities around the islands throughout the 1930s and early 1940s.

American colonial archaeology in the Philippines came to an end in 1941 when the islands were occupied by the Japanese. Beyer was interned by the occupying forces, although he was allowed to continue his work at the university. During this time he compiled two synoptic papers, 'Outline review of Philippine archaeology by islands and provinces' (1947) and Philippine and East Asian Archaeology (1948), which laid the foundation for subsequent Philippine archaeology.

=== Post-independence ===
The Philippines gained independence from the United States in the 1946, but Beyer continued at his post at the University of Philippines until 1954. In 1949, he was joined by Wilhelm Solheim, who was known in the Philippines for finding various pottery at different archaeological sites. In the 1960s, Robert B. Fox did archaeological work in the Philippines and is most famous for his research in the Tabon Caves. In 1965, Fox had found a pot from the late Neolithic Period called the Yawning Jarlet at his time at the Tabon Caves.

Alfredo E. Evangelista was a student of Beyer, Solheim and Fox and had instantly fallen in love with archaeology. In 1956, worked with Robert Fox excavating the Bato Caves in the Sorsogon Province and later on they would excavate along the coast of Cagraray and Bikol.

One of Evangelista's famous discovery in the Philippines was the excavation in 1957 of a Neolithic jar burial site in Nueva Ecija in Luzon. In 1960 he began to work with Robert Fox and Ray Santiago for the National Museum of the Philippines. From the 1970s to early 1990s, Evangelista then began to work at the University of the Philippines in Quezon City and again later at the National Museum of the Philippines in Manila.

In 1960, Alfredo Evangelista and F. Landa Jocano worked together and discovered the Oton death mask in San Antonio, Oton, Iloilo. Like Evangelista, Jocano he worked at the National Museum of the Philippines as well as the University of the Philippines. Inspired by Fox and Beyer, Jocano brought New World terminology by using previous data to the prehistory of the Philippines.

After Evangelista retired from the National Museum of the Philippines in 1992 Jesus T. Peralta became the Director III. Prior to becoming Director III, he was part of the Archaeology Division at the National Museum of the Philippines in 1988.

Karl L. Hutterer, who studied under Solheim, became an influence to Philippine archaeology. Hutterer taught students the socioeconomic and political complexity of doing research in the field of archaeology. When showing the socioeconomic processes to students, he focused on showing the diversity with the various cultures around areas. An artifact that Hutterer has examined in a geometric stone tools.

In the late 1970s, William A. Longacre went to northern Luzon to do research on enthoarchaeology in the Kallinga region. He later furthered his research in southern Luzon, studying how earthenware potteries were made. An artifact that Longacre help discover and date was the Calatagan Pot with inscription. In 1992, he contributed dating the pot with an accelerated mass spectroscopy, but failed to gather sufficient data. He later suggested using a different form of dating C-14 technique to get an accurate date of the inscription.

Before the 1980s, archaeology in the Philippines focused more on culture and history. The main way that archaeologists studied archaeology was using an inductive approach. When searching for artifacts the National Museum focused on collecting prehistoric remains.

== Notable sites and discoveries ==
=== Stone Age ===
==== Palaeolithic ====
- The earliest evidence of hominins living in the Philippines is the 700,000-year-old remains of a butchered rhinoceros in Kalinga Province in Luzon. Predating the existence of Homo sapiens by at least 400,000 years, the butchered rhinoceros and the stone tools around it point to a possible colonization of Homo erectus or another possible Homo the Denisovans.
- The 67,000-year-old Callao Man. was found in Callao cave and, before the found remains of 700,000 year old rhinoceros, was the oldest human fossil in the Asia Pacific region.
- The Tabon Caves have produced a number of archaeological finds, indicating it was occupied almost continuously between 50,000 and 9000 years ago. Notably, a collection of anatomically modern human remains known as the Tabon Man was for a long time the oldest known evidence of a human presence in the Philippines.
- Later findings shed light on the daily lives of hunter-gatherers occupying a rock shelter in Ille Caves, Palawan, Philippines. Located near the Tabon Caves, the Ille Caves rock shelter was occupied many times, but the oldest stratigraphic layer puts the first occupation of that rock shelter at c. 14,000 cal bp (calibrated years before present). This assessment was made based on the presence of charcoal, placing this site well into the Pleistocene.
- Researchers from Ateneo de Manila University uncovered evidence suggesting advanced maritime technology and long-distance networks in the Philippines around 35,000 years ago, reshaping understanding of early human migration in Island Southeast Asia.

==== Neolithic ====
- The Angono Petroglyphs- the oldest known work of art in the Philippines located in the province of Rizal. There are 127 human and animal figures engraved on the rockwall probably carved during the late Neolithic. These inscriptions clearly show stylized human figures, frogs and lizards, along with other designs that may have depicted other interesting figures but erosion may have caused it to become indistinguishable. The engravings are mostly symbolic representations associated with healing and sympathetic magic. The site has been declared by the National Museum of the Philippines as a National Cultural Treasure in 1973.
- Alab Petroglyphs of Mountain Province
- Penablanca Petrographs of Cagayan Province
- Singnapan Caves Petrographs of southern Palawan
- Anda Peninsula Petrographs of Eastern Bohol
- Lapuz Lapuz Cave
- Lal-lo and Gattaran Shell Middens – The Lal-lo and Gattaran Shell Middens are located along the banks of the Cagayan River in the province of Cagayan, Philippines. It is currently under consideration as a UNESCO World Heritage Site.
- Yawning Jarlet-The Late Neolithic period in the Philippines, Evidence shows by a Yawning Jarlet on the Burial site in Leta-leta caves in Palawan by Robert Fox which had later become National treasure in the Philippines. It is the earliest pot recovered in the country.
- Bark cloth beater – It is a stone tool used for the preparation of bark cloth. Early Palawenios fashioned the beaters from cylindrical stones and used the stone beaters for pounding the bark to loosen the pulp from the fiber. The bark cloth is ready when all the pulp has been stripped off, leaving a network of fibers. The stone tool found in Arku Cave, Penablanca, Cagayan was dated 1255-605 B.C. Another bark-cloth beater was found in Sagung cave in Southern Palawan.
- Jade Artifacts- or Jade Culture made from white and green nephrite and dating as far back as 2000–1500 BC, has been discovered at a number of archeological excavations in the Philippines since the 1930s. The artifacts have been both tools like chisels, and ornaments such as lingling-o earrings, bracelets and beads. A "jade culture" is said to have existed as evidenced by tens of thousands of exquisitely crafted jade artifacts found at a site in Batangas province.

=== Metal Age ===
- Manunggul Jar (890–710 B.C.) is a secondary burial jar excavated from a burial site in the Manunggul cave of the Tabon Caves at Lipuun Point in Palawan. It dates from 890 to 710 B.C. and the two prominent figures at the top handle of its cover represent the journey of the soul to the afterlife.
- Artifacts from the "Sa Huynh-Kalanay" pottery complex in Masbate (dated 400BC-1500 AD.)

The Sa Huỳnh culture was a culture in modern-day central and southern Vietnam that flourished between 1000 BC and 200 AD. Archaeological sites from the culture have been discovered from the Mekong Delta to Quang Binh province in central Vietnam. The Sa Huynh people were most likely the predecessors of the Cham people, an Austronesian-speaking people and the founders of the kingdom of Champa.

- Maitum Anthropomorphic Pottery (190 BC to 500 AD)– In 1991, the National Museum archaeological team discovered anthropomorphic secondary burial jars in Ayub Cave, Barangay Pinol, Maitum, Sarangani Province, Mindanao, Philippines, dating them to be from between 190 BC and 500 AD. The jars are commonly known today as Maitum jars. They are made of earthenware, and are characterized by their design that suggests human figures with complete or partial facial features of the first inhabitants in Mindanao. Furthermore, they give emphasis to the Filipinos' popular belief of life after death.
- Sultan Kudarat Anthropomorphic Pottery (not yet carbon-dated) - In 2008, officials found a tricycle (common Philippine vehicle) carrying artifacts similar in shape with the Maitum Anthropomorphic Potteries, but are painted, and have clearer expressions. The shards were explicitly crafted, more expertly than those found in Sarangani in 1991. The looter afterwards presented forged documents of his ownership on the shards. He was afterwards arrested. The National Museum of the Philippines confirmed that the way the jar shards were made is new to Philippine archaeology, as no known ethnic group in the entire country is known to craft such precise pieces of burial jars. The museum confirmed that the jars may be the remnant artifacts of a lost tribe in the Philippines that may have gone extinct prior to colonization. The jars were found 'somewhere in Sultan Kudarat province' according to the reports, but the true location has not been determined as the caught looter is only a part of the chain which looted the artifacts from its original location. Other scholars speculate that the jars came from Maguindanao. In either case, looking for the original archaeological site of the jars was deemed as a difficult task as both Sultan Kudarat and Maguindanao are home to Muslim rebels fighting government forces, making it hard for scholars to enter the area and make an expedition. Funding on a possible expedition was also deemed as extremely limited. No expedition to locate the original archaeological site of the jars has been made up to present time. Research on the jars have also been hindered as expert findings can only be made once the location has been well-researched on, according to the National Museum.

=== Early Historic Period (900–1521) ===
==== Architecture ====
===== Indigenous architecture =====
- Idjang- A triangle-shaped Citadel erected in Batanes Islands in the Philippines, made from limestone and wood.
- Limestone tombs of Kamhantik is an excavated remains of a thousand-year-old village found in the jungles of Mount Maclayao in Sitio Kamhantik within the Buenavista Protected Landscape of Mulanay, Quezon, Philippines. It is composed of fifteen limestone coffins that can be dated back from the period of 10th to 14th century based on one of National Museum's top archaeologist "a complex archaeological site with both habitation and burial remains from the period of approximately 10th to the 14th century ... the first of its kind in the Philippines having carved limestone tombs."

===== Islamic architecture =====
- Sheik Karimol Makhdum Mosque – located in Barangay Tubig Indangan, Simunul, Tawi-Tawi, Philippines. It is the oldest mosque in the Philippines and was built by an Arab trader, Sheikh Makhdum Karim in 1380. The original pillars of the old mosque can still be found inside the new building. It is also declared as a National Historical Landmark by the National Historical Commission.

==== Burial sites and grave artifacts ====
- Oton death mask – Discovered in the 1960s by Alfredo Evanghilista and F. Landa Jocan, it consists of gold nose-disc and eye mask find in an ancient grave in Oton, Iloilo. The Death Mask was used to cover the faces of the dead to inhibit evil spirits from entering the body of the deceased. This practice was brought over from China to the Philippines between the late 14th to 15th century.
- The Kabayan Mummies of Benguet also known as the Kabayan Mummies, Benguet Mummies, or Ibaloi Mummies, are a group of mummies found along the mountain slopes of Kabayan, a town in the northern part of the Philippines. They were made from as early as 2000 BC until the 16th century, when Spain colonized the Philippines. Today, they remain in natural caves and a museum in Kabayan.

==== Clothing or jewelry ====
- Banton Colth-The Banton cloth is the earliest known warp ikat (tie-resist dyeing) textile in Southeast Asia. Estimated to be 400 years old, the burial cloth was found in a wooden coffin that also contained blue and white ceramics in Banton Island, Romblon. The shroud was woven from red, black and white abaca threads. At present, the people in Bontok, Mt. Province use a colorful burial cloth to wrap the dead.
- Lingling-o- Lingling-o are an "omega shaped" type of pendant or amulet that has been associated with various Indigenous cultures of the Philippines since the early metal age. The earliest surviving examples of lingling-o, dating back to the metal age, were made out of Nephrite jade, but many later examples were made of shell, gold, copper, and wood; the kind of material suggests differences in the social standing of its wearer. Recent findings in the Northern Philippine province of Batanes, led by anthropologist Peter Bellwood in the early 2000s, have led to the discovery of an ancient goldsmith's shop that made the 20-centuries-old lingling-o, providing evidence of the Indigenous Philippine manufacture of such artifacts as early as 2,500 years ago.
- The Philippines's archaeological finds include many ancient gold artifacts.

==== Currency ====
- Piloncitos – the earliest form of precious metal based currency of the Philippines. It is likely made of pure gold with a weight ranging between .5 grams to more or less than 3 grams a size of a corn kernel—and weigh from 0.09 to 2.65 grams of fine gold. Large Piloncitos weighing 2.65 grams approximate the weight of one mass. Piloncitos have been excavated from Mandaluyong, Bataan, the banks of the Pasig River, Batangas, Marinduque, Samar, Leyte and some areas in Mindanao.
- Gold ring currencies- The early Filipinos traded Piloncitos also along with Gold rings, which is gold ring-like ingots. These barter rings are bigger than doughnuts in size and are made of nearly pure gold.

==== Documents, inscriptions, or seals ====
- Laguna Copperplate Inscription- The oldest written document in the Philippines found in Lumban River dated in 900 AD which is written in Kawi.
- Butuan Silver Paleograph also known as the "Butuan Silver Strip", is a piece of metal with Kawi inscriptions found in Butuan province in the mid-1970s by a team of archaeologists from the National Museum of the Philippines.
- Ticao Stone Inscription also known as Monreal stone or Rizal Stone – A limestone contains ancient script Baybayin. Found by pupils of Rizal Elementary School on Ticao Island in Monreal town, Masbate province, which had scraped the mud off their shoes and slippers on two irregular shaped limestone tablets before entering their classroom. are now housed at a section of the National Museum, which weighs 30 kilos, is 11 centimeters thick, 54 cm long and 44 cm wide while the other is 6 cm thick, 20 cm long and 18 cm wide.
- The Baybayin Archives of the University of Santo Tomas in Manila, one of the largest archives in the Philippines, currently possesses the biggest collection of extant ancient Baybayin alphabets in the world.
- Butuan Ivory Seal- an ivory stamp or seal stamp or a privy seal associated with a Rhinoceros Ivory Tusk, dated 9th–12th century, was found in Libertad, Butuan in Agusan del Norte in southern Philippines. Inscribed on the seal is the word Butban in stylized Kawi. The script has a similarity to the Tagalog script. Butban, was presumed to stand for Butwan or Butuan, since the letters “b” and “w” were frequently interchanged. The ivory seal is now housed at the National Museum of the Philippines.

==== Iconography ====
===== Hindu-Buddhist =====
Although some 20th century historians believed that the various cultures of the Philippine archipelago first encountered Hindu and/or Buddhist beliefes as early as the 2nd and 3rd centuries BCE, more recent scholarship suggests that these cultural influences mostly filtered in during the 10th through the early 14th centuries. Present-day scholarship believes these religious and cultural influences mostly came through trade with Southeast Asian thassalocratic empires such as the Srivijaya and Majapahit, which had in turn had trade relationships with India.

Scholars such as Milton Osborne emphasise that despite these beliefs being originally from India, they reached the Philippines through Southeast Asian cultures with Austronesian roots.

Artifacts reflect the iconography of the Vajrayana Buddhism and its influences on the Philippines's early states.

- Bronze Lokesvara – This is bronze statue of Lokesvara was found in Isla Puting Bato in Tondo, Manila.
- Buddha Amithaba bass relief The Ancient Batangueños were influenced by India as shown in the origin of most languages from Sanskrit and certain ancient potteries. A Buddhist image was reproduced in mould on a clay medallion in bas-relief from the municipality of Calatagan. According to experts, the image in the pot strongly resembles the iconographic portrayal of Buddha in Siam, India, and Nepal. The pot shows Buddha Amithaba in the tribhanga pose inside an oval nimbus. Scholars also noted that there is a strong Mahayanic orientation in the image, since the Boddhisattva Avalokitesvara was also depicted.
- Golden Garuda of Palawan- The other finds are the garuda, the mythical bird that is common to Buddhism and Hinduism, Another gold artifact, from the Tabon Caves in the island of Palawan, is an image of Garuda, the bird who is the mount of Vishnu. The discovery of sophisticated Hindu imagery and gold artifacts in Tabon Caves has been linked to those found from Oc Eo, in the Mekong Delta in Southern Vietnam.
- Bronze Ganesha statues – A crude bronze statue of a Hindu Deity Ganesha has been found by Henry Otley Beyer in 1921 in an ancient site in Puerto Princesa, Palawan and in Mactan. Cebu the crude bronze statue indicates of its local reproduction.
- Mactan Alokitesvara – Excavated in 1921 in Mactan, Cebu by H.O.Beyer the statue is bronze may be a siva-buddhist blending rather than "pure Buddhist".
- The Golden Tara was discovered in 1918 in Esperanza, Agusan by Bilay Campos a Manobo tribeswoman. The Golden Tara was eventually brought to the Field Museum of Natural History in Chicago, Illinois in 1922. Henry Otley Beyer, and some experts have agreed on its identity and have dated it to belong within 900–950 CE. They can not place, however, its provenance because it has distinct features.
- Golden Kinnari- The golden-vessel kinnari was found in 1981 in Surigao. The kinnari exists in both Buddhist and Hindu mythology. In Buddhism, the kinnari, a half-human and half-bird creature, represents enlightened action. The Buddhist Lotus Sutra mentions the kinnari as the celestial musician in the Himavanta realm. The kinnari takes the form of a centaur, however, in India's epic poem, the Mahabharata, and in the Veda's Purana part.
- Padmapani and Nandi images – Padmapani is also known as Avalokitesvara, the wisdom being or Bodhisattva of Compassion. Golden jewelry found so far include rings, some surmounted by images of Nandi – the sacred bull, linked chains, inscribed gold sheets, gold plaques decorated with repoussé images of Hindu deities.
- Bukidnon Copper Tara
- Agusan Gold Mahāpratisarā Amulet
- Agusan Wooden Makara Vessel
- Samar Gold Garuda Earrings

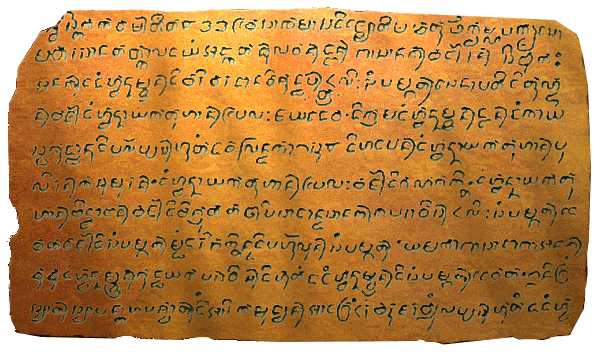
The Laguna Copperplate Inscription (above) found in 1989 suggests Indian cultural influence in the Philippines by the 9th century AD, likely through Hinduism in Indonesia, prior to the arrival of European colonial empires in the 16th century.

==== Ships ====
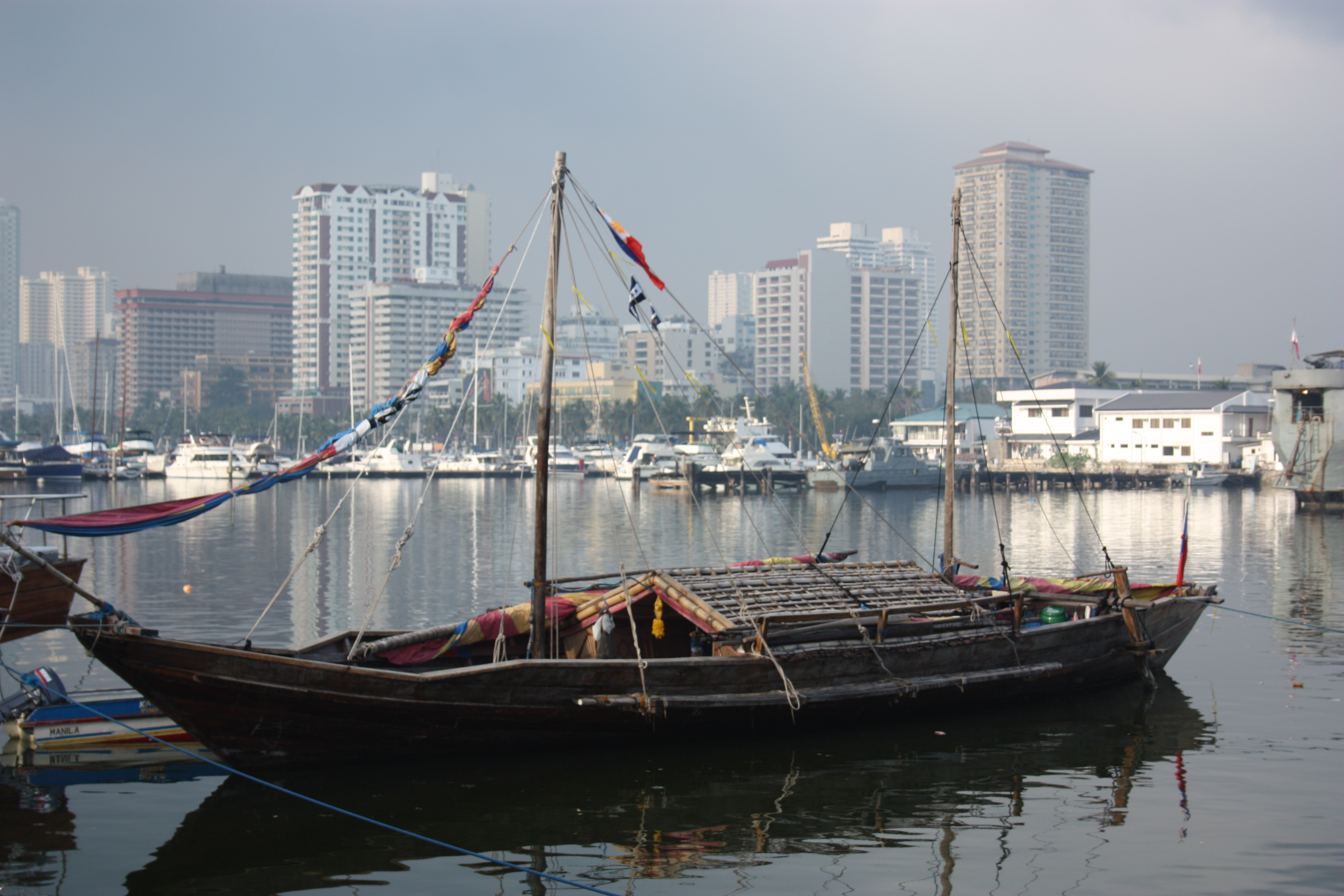
The balangay replica docked at CCP Harbor Manila after its South East Asian expedition.

- Balangay (Butuan Boat)- the first wooden watercraft excavated in Southeast Asia and is evidence of early Filipino craftsmanship and their seamanship skills during pre-colonial times. The Balanghai Festival is also a celebration in Butuan, Agusan del Norte to commemorate the coming of the early migrants that settled the Philippines, on board the Balangay boats. When the first Spaniards arrived in the 16th century, they found the Filipinos living in well-organized independent villages called barangays. The name barangay originated from balangay, the Austronesian word for "sailboat".
- The Pandanan Shipwreck is a 15th-century archaeological site which was excavated in 1995 by the Underwater Archaeology Division of the National Museum of the Philippines in Pandanan Island, in the coast of Southern Palawan. The ship was surmised to be a Southeast Asian cargo boat travelling from either Vietnam or Southern China and is one of the best preserved pre-Spanish trading ships within the jurisdiction of Philippines. It is speculated that the ship stopped at some ports in Mainland Southeast Asia to load trade wares. Bad weather might have led to the sinking of the ship.

==== Indigenous utensil artifacts ====
- Calatagan Ritual pot – a clay pot contain Badlit inscriptions, The pot was probably also used for ceremonies to retrieve victims of bugkut, disappeared persons believed to have been abducted by dwellers of the spirit world. The paper provides a glossary of 26 Bisayan words that could be derived from the Calatagan Pot inscription.

==== Tradeware artifacts ====
===== Porcelain tradeware =====
Porcelain tradeware from Vietnam, Taiwan, and China were so prevalent during the Philippines "late metal age" that early scholars of Philippine anthropology came to refer to the period as the Philippines' "Porcelain age." Before the discovery of the Laguna Copperplate Inscription in the early 1990s, anthropologist, the richness of historical clues which could be derived from these porcelain artifacts led scholars to use the term "protohistory." The Iron Age consisted of a phase called the "Porcelain Age," and porcelain in this phase entered the Philippines around the nineteenth century A.D. along with "glazed stoneware" from Southeast Asia.

- The "Flying elephant of Lenna Shoal" plate is considered a remarkable example of Chinese tradeware, with only two extant examples known in the world today.

=== Colonial (1521–1946) ===
==== Spanish colonial period ====
- Magellan's Cross is a Christian cross planted by Portuguese and Spanish explorers as ordered by Ferdinand Magellan upon arriving in Cebu in the Philippines on (depending on source) 15 March 1521.

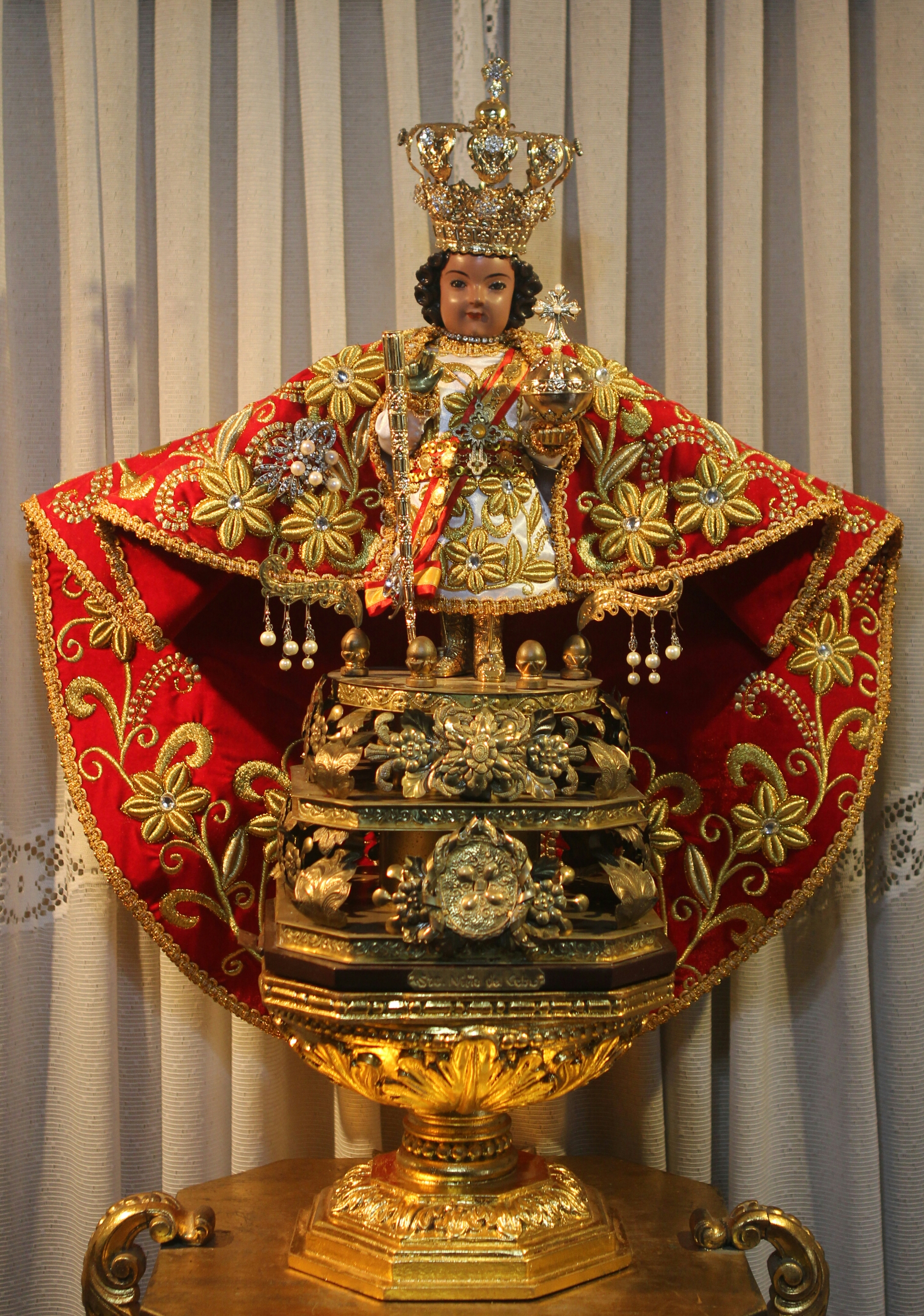
The Santo Niño de Cebú, one of the oldest Christian relics in the Philippines.

- The Santo Niño de Cebú is a Roman Catholic title of a statue of the Child Jesus in Cebu City of Philippines. The image is venerated as miraculous by many Filipino Catholics. It is one of the oldest Christian relics in the Philippines, originally given in 1521 as a gift by explorer Ferdinand Magellan to Rajah Humabon and his wife when he landed on the island.
- The Black Nazarene is a life-sized image of a dark-skinned, kneeling Jesus Christ carrying the Cross enshrined in the Minor Basilica of the Black Nazarene in the Quiapo district of the City of Manila, Philippines. The Black Nazarene was carved by an unknown Mexican from a dark wood in the 16th century in Mexico, and then transported to the Philippines in 1606. It depicts Jesus en route to his crucifixion. Pope Innocent X granted recognition to the lay Confraternity of Santo Cristo Jesús Nazareno in 1650 for the promotion of the devotion to Jesus through the icon. It was housed in several churches near Manila in the early decades, arriving in Quiapo Church in 1787 where it has been enshrined ever since.

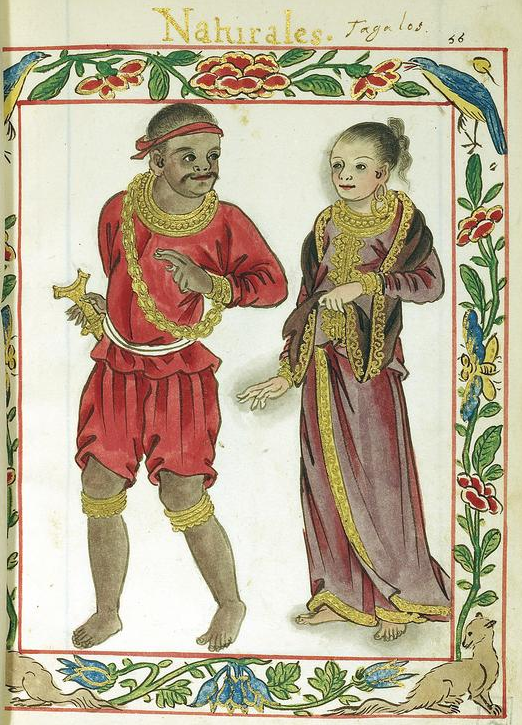
The attire of a Tagalog Maharlika nobility depicts in the Boxer Codex.

- Boxer Codex – a manuscript written c. 1590, which contains illustrations of ethnic groups in the Philippines at the time of their initial contact with the Spaniards. Aside from a description of, and historical allusions to what is now the Philippines and various other Far Eastern countries, the codex also contains seventy-five coloured drawings of the inhabitants of these regions and their distinctive costume.
- Doctrina Christiana- an early book on the Roman Catholic Catechism, written in 1593 by Fray Juan de Plasencia, and is believed to be one of the earliest printed books in the Philippines. extant copies had been find ancient script translation along with the Spanish Latin content. Baybayin is widely used in the Philippines even before the Spaniards came.
- Murillo Map also known as Carta hydrographica y chorographica de las Islas Filipinas – Map of the Philippine Islands published by Pedro Murillo Velarde in 1774, the earliest map so far it was drawn and engraved by the skilled Filipino artisans Francisco Suarez and Nicolas de la Cruz Bagay .
- Magellan Shrine
- Fort Santiago is a citadel first built by Spanish conquistador, Miguel López de Legazpi for the new established city of Manila in the Philippines. The defense fortress is part of the structures of the walled city of Manila referred to as Intramuros.
- Fort Capul, Northern Samar – Founded in 1596 by the Jesuits, it the only town with a majority of the rare Inakbanon language speakers. The town became the focal transition between the Manila-Acapulco galleon trade from the 16th to 18th centuries. A fort town, much of the architecture of the town is based on protection against Moro raiders coming from as far as Mindanao.
- The Ruins of Old Tanauan church is located at the lake shore of Talisay in Batangas Province are remains of a church structure dating to the Spanish Colonial Period of the Philippines. It is the site of the first stone church of Tanauan, before the whole town relocated to its present location in 1754. Currently the ruins are within the property of Club Balai Isabel Resort.

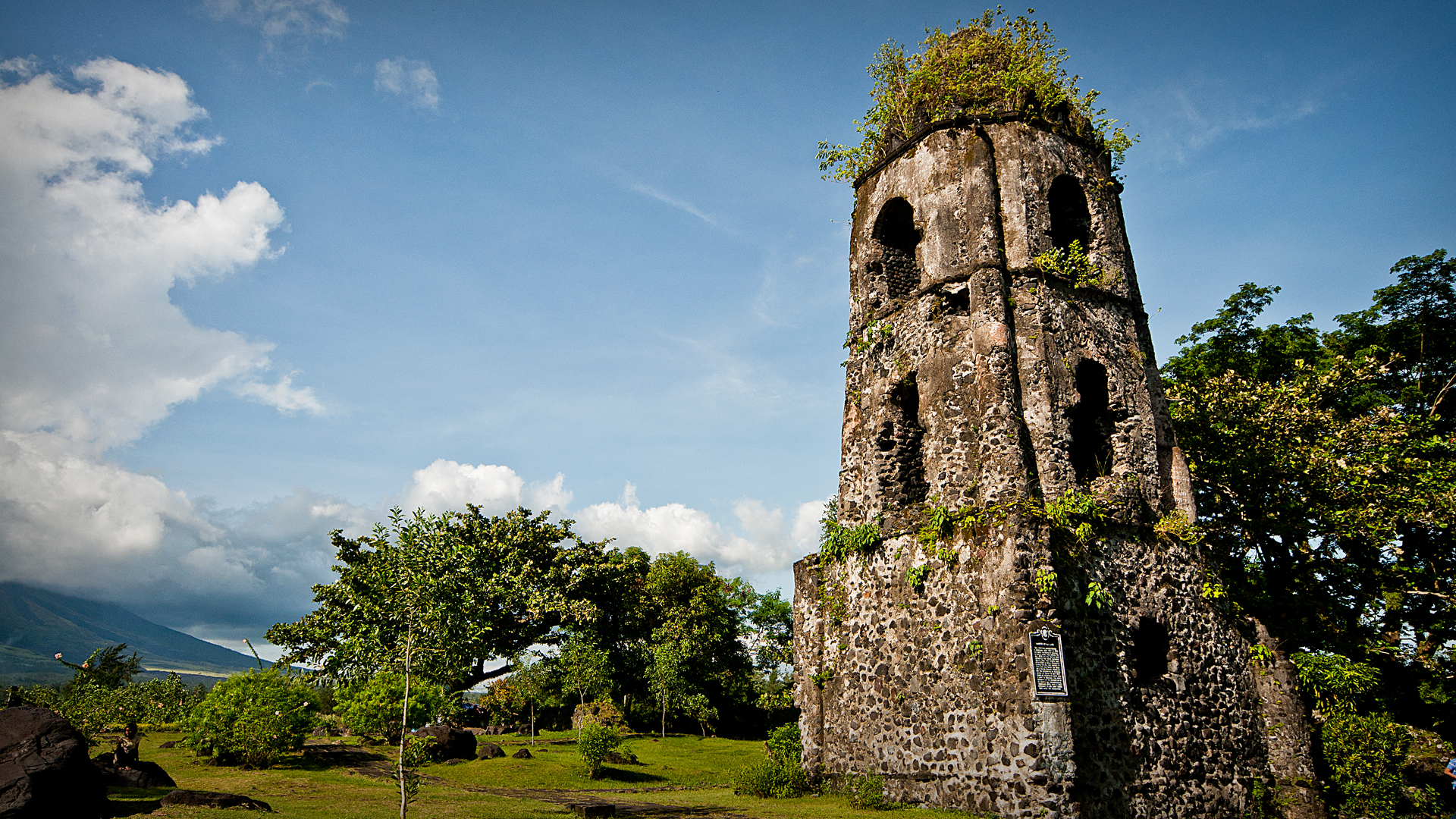
Ruins of the Cagsawa church.

- The Cagsawa Ruins are the remnants of a 16th-century Franciscan church, the Cagsawa church. It was originally built in the town of Cagsawa in 1587 but was burned down by Dutch pirates in 1636. but was destroyed again, along with the town of Cagsawa, on February 1, 1814, during the eruption of the Mayon Volcano. The ruins are currently located in Barangay Busay, Cagsawa, in the municipality of Daraga, Albay, Philippines It is part of Cagsawa Park and is protected and maintained by the municipal government of Daraga and the National Museum of the Philippines.

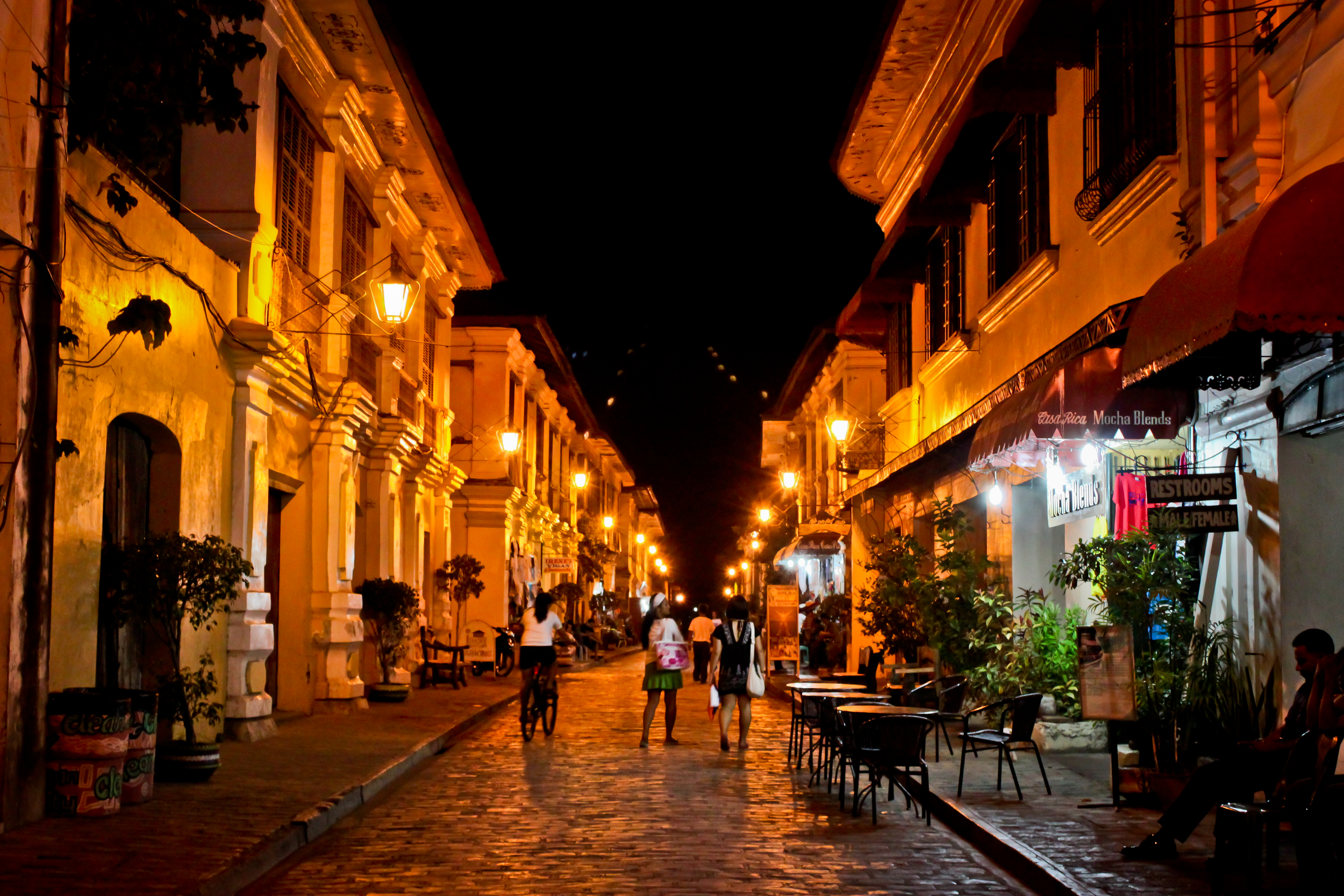
Calle Crisologo in Vigan at night.

- City of Vigan Located on the western coast of the large island of Luzon, facing the South China Sea, is a UNESCO World Heritage Site in that it is one of the few towns left in the Philippines whose old structures have mostly remained intact, and it is well known for its cobblestone streets and architecture of the Philippine colonial era which fuses Native Philippine and Oriental building designs and construction, with colonial Spanish architecture. Former Philippine president Elpidio Quirino, the sixth President of the Philippines, was born in Vigan, at the former location of the provincial jail (his father was a warden); he resided in the Syquia Mansion. In May 2015, Vigan City was officially recognized as one of the New7Wonders Cities together with Beirut, Doha, Durban, Havana, Kuala Lumpur and La Paz. New7Wonders Foundation president and founding member Bernard Weber led a ceremony held at St. Paul Cathedral where he handed a bronze plaque to Vigan Mayor Eva Grace Singson-Medina, signifying the heritage city's election as one of the world's wonder cities.
- Banaue Rice Terraces- Initially believed to pre-date the arrival of the Spanish colonizers, recent scholarship has led scholars to conclude that the Banaue rice terraces were constructed in the 1650s, an Indigenous response to Spanish colonial rule in the lowlands.

==== American colonial period ====
- The El Fraile Island (originally known as Fort Drum), which nicknamed as "the concrete battleship," is a heavily fortified island situated at the mouth of Manila Bay in the Philippines, due south of Corregidor Island. The reinforced concrete fortress shaped like a battleship was built by the United States in 1909 as one of the harbor defenses at the wider South Channel entrance to the bay during the American colonial period. It was captured and occupied by the Japanese during World War II, and was recaptured by the U.S. after igniting petroleum and gasoline in the fort, leaving it permanently out of commission.
- The Malinta Tunnel is a tunnel complex built by the United States Army Corps of Engineers on the island of Corregidor in the Philippines. It was initially used as a bomb-proof storage and personnel bunker, but was later equipped as a 1,000-bed hospital. The main tunnel, running east to west, is 831 feet (253 m) long, 24 feet (7.3 m) wide and 18 feet (5.5 m) high. Branching off from this main shaft are 13 lateral tunnels on the north side and 11 lateral tunnels on the south side. Each lateral averaged 160 feet (49 m) in length and 15 feet (4.6 m) in width.
- The Pearl of Lao Tzu (also referred to as previously as Pearl of Allah) used to be the largest known pearl. The pearl was found in the Palawan sea, which surrounds the island of Palawan in the Philippines, and was found by a Filipino diver. It is not considered a gemstone pearl, but is instead known as a "clam pearl" or "Tridacna pearl" from a giant clam. It measures 24 centimeters in diameter (9.45 inches) and weighs 6.4 kilograms (14.2 lb).

=== Contemporary artifacts (1947 onwards) ===
- Macliing Dulag's door - The University of the Philippines Baguio's Museo Kordilyera has preserved the door of Kalinga protest leader Macliing Dulag's home, still ridden with bulletholes after the 4th Infantry Division of the Philippine Army opened fire on the house on 24 April 1980, killing Macliing Dulag and wounding a companion.
- Chapter 3 of The Archaeology of Central Philippines, "The Kalanay Cave Site, Masbate, Philippines," describes the site and Solheim's excavations in 1951 and 1953. It describes a small burial cave that contained a large amount of pottery, a few stone and iron tools, a few other artifacts, and some fragmentary skeletal remains.

== See also ==
- History of the Philippines
- History of Archaeology in the Philippines
- Religion in pre-colonial Philippines
- Cultural achievements of pre-colonial Philippines
- Architecture of the Philippines
- Archaeology of Pinagbayanan
- Archaeology of Porac, Pampanga
- Ifugao archaeology
- Prehistory of Laguna (province)
- Prehistory of Marinduque
- Prehistory of Pampanga
- Prehistory of Sarangani
- Shell tools in the Philippines
- Ship burial in Asia
- Dambana
- Suyat

== Sources ==
- Roces, Alfredo R., ed. (1977), "Boxer Codex", Filipino Heritage: the Making of a Nation, vol. IV, Philippines: Lahing Pilipino Publishing, Inc.
