= Models of migration to the Philippines =

Since H. Otley Beyer first proposed his wave migration theory, numerous scholars have approached the question of how, when and why humans first came to the Philippines. The current scientific consensus favors the "Out of Taiwan" model, which broadly match linguistic, genetic, archaeological, and cultural evidence.

== Modern theories ==
Chronological map of the Austronesian expansion

Modern theories of the peopling of the Philippines islands are interpreted against the wider backdrop of the migrations of the Austronesian peoples. They comprise two major schools of thought, the "Out of Sundaland" models and the "Out of Taiwan" model. Of the two, however, the most widely accepted hypothesis is the Out-of-Taiwan model, which largely corresponds to linguistic, genetic, archaeological, and cultural evidence. It has since been strengthened by genetic and archaeological studies that broadly agree with the timeline of the Austronesian expansion.

=== Out of Sundaland ===
The various "Out of Sundaland" hypotheses, posited by a minority of modern authors and differing slightly in the details, is similar to F. Landa Jocano's "Core Population" hypothesis. However, instead of the Philippines, they assume the origin of the Austronesian peoples as being the now sunken Sundaland landmass (modern Sumatra, Java, Borneo, and the Malay Peninsula). These models have been criticized as relying only on mtDNA genetic data without accounting for admixture events, thus having results that mistakenly combine the much older Paleolithic Negrito populations with the newer Neolithic Austronesian peoples.

==== Nusantao Maritime Trading and Communication Network ====
A notable model among the "Out of Sundaland" hypothesis is Wilhelm Solheim II's "Nusantao Maritime Trading and Communication Network" (NMTCN). It posited an alternative model based on maritime movement of people over different directions and routes. It suggests that people with distant origins from 50,000 years ago in the area of present-day coastal eastern Vietnam and Southern China had moved to the area of the Bismarck Islands south and east of Mindanao and developed into the Austronesian cultures. They supposedly later spread among seafarers from the area to the rest of Island Southeast Asia and areas along the South China Sea. In support of this idea Solheim notes there is little or no indication that Pre- or Proto Malayo-Polynesian was present in Taiwan. According to Solheim, "The one thing I feel confident in saying is that all native Southeast Asians are closely related culturally, genetically and to a lesser degree linguistically."

Solheim's concept of the Nusantao Maritime Trading and Communication Network, while not strictly a theory regarding the biological ancestors of modern Southeast Asians, does suggest that the patterns of cultural diffusion throughout the Asia-Pacific region are not what would be expected if such cultures were to be explained by simple migration. Where Bellwood based his analysis primarily on linguistic analysis, Solheim's approach was based on artifact findings. On the basis of a careful analysis of artifacts, he suggests the existence of a trade and communication network that first spread in the Asia-Pacific region during its Neolithic age (c.8,000 to 500 BC). According to Solheim's NMTCN theory, this trade network, consisting of both Austronesian and non-Austronesian seafaring peoples, was responsible for the spread of cultural patterns throughout the Asia-Pacific region, not the simple migration proposed by the Out-of-Taiwan hypothesis.

Solheim came up with four geographical divisions delineating the spread of the NMTCN over time, calling these geographical divisions "lobes." Specifically, these were the central, northern, eastern and western lobes.

The central lobe was further divided into two smaller lobes reflecting phases of cultural spread: the Early Central Lobe and the Late Central Lobe. Instead of Austronesian peoples originating from Taiwan, Solheim placed the origins of the early NMTCN peoples in the "Early Central Lobe," which was in eastern coastal Vietnam, at around 9000 BC.

He then suggests the spread of peoples around 5000 BC towards the "Late central lobe", including the Philippines, via island Southeast Asia, rather than from the north as the Taiwan theory suggests. Thus, from the Point of view of the Philippine peoples, the NMTCN is also referred to as the Island Origin Theory.

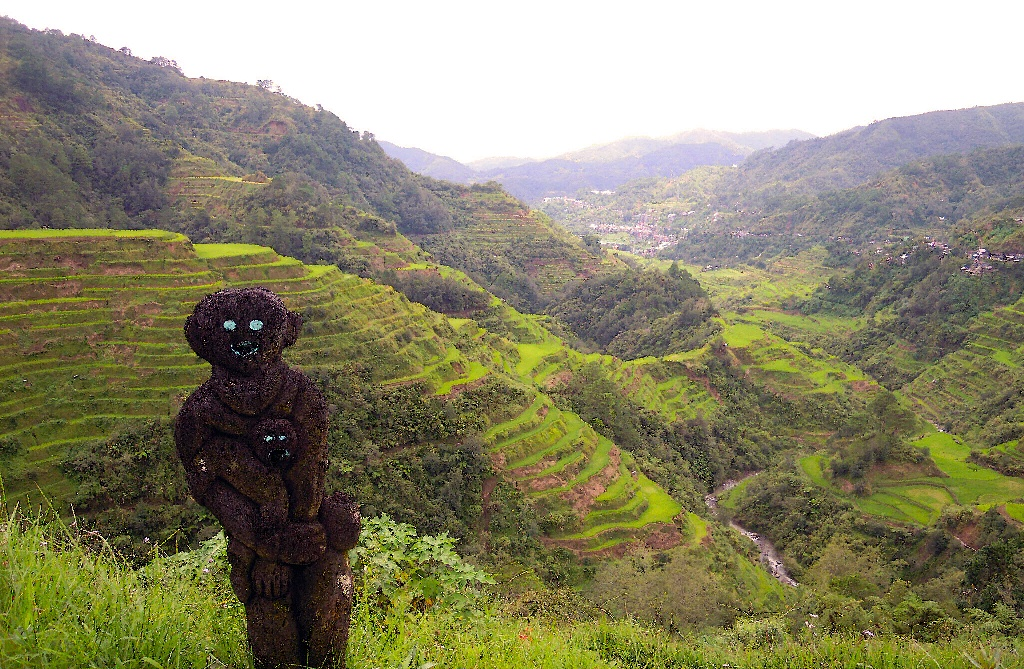
An Ifugao hogang, guardian spirits carved from tree fern trunks, overlooking the Banaue Rice Terraces

This "late central lobe" included southern China and Taiwan, which became "the area where Austronesian became the original language family and Malayo-Polynesian developed." In about 4000 to 3000 BC, these peoples continued spreading east through Northern Luzon to Micronesia to form the Early Eastern Lobe, carrying the Malayo-Polynesian languages with them. These languages would become part of the culture spread by the NMTCN in its expansions Malaysia and western towards Malaysia before 2000 BC, continuing along coastal India and Sri Lanka up to the western coast of Africa and Madagascar; and over time, further eastward towards its easternmost borders at Easter Island. Thus, as in the case of Bellwood's theory, the Austronesian languages spread eastward and westward from the area around the Philippines. Aside from the matter of the origination of peoples, the difference between the two theories is that Bellwood's theory suggests a linear expansion, while Solheim's suggests something more akin to concentric circles, all overlapping in the geographical area of the late central lobe which includes the Philippines.

=== Out of Taiwan ===
The most widely accepted hypothesis today is the "Out of Taiwan" model, first proposed by Peter Bellwood. Although originally largely based on linguistic evidence, it has corresponded to archaeological, cultural, and genetic findings later on; including whole genome sequencing data, rather than the mtDNA sequencing relied upon by "Out of Sundaland" proponents.

In this hypothesis, the first Austronesians reached the Philippines at around 2200 BC from Taiwan, settling the Batanes Islands and northern Luzon. From there, they rapidly spread downwards to the rest of the islands of the Philippines and Southeast Asia, as well as voyaging further east to reach the Northern Mariana Islands by around 1500 BC. They assimilated the earlier Negrito groups which arrived during the Paleolithic, resulting in the modern Filipino ethnic groups which all display various ratios of genetic admixture between Austronesian and Negrito groups.

=== Multiple waves ===
A 2021 genetic study, which examined representatives of 115 indigenous communities, found evidence of at least five independent waves of early human migration. Negrito groups, divided between those in Luzon and those in Mindanao, may come from a single wave and diverged subsequently, or through two separate waves. This likely occurred sometime after 46,000 years ago. Another Negrito migration entered Mindanao sometime after 25,000 years ago. Two early East Asian waves (Austroasiatic and possible Austric) were detected, one most strongly evidenced among the Manobo people who live in inland Mindanao, and the other in the Sama-Bajau and related people of the Sulu archipelago, Zamboanga Peninsula, and Palawan. The admixture found in the Sama people indicates a relationship with the Lua and Mlabri people of mainland Southeast Asia, and reflects a similar genetic signal found in western Indonesia. These happened sometime after 15,000 years ago and 12,000 years ago respectively, around the time the last glacial period was coming to an end.

Austronesians, either from Southern China or Taiwan, were found to have come in at least two distinct waves. The first, occurring perhaps between 10,000 and 7,000 years ago, brought the ancestors of indigenous groups that today live around the Cordillera Central mountain range. Later migrations brought other Austronesian groups, along with agriculture, and the languages of these recent Austronesian migrants effectively replaced those existing populations. Papuan ancestry was also detected among the ethnic Blaan and Sangir people of Mindanao, suggesting that there was westward expansion of peoples from Papua New Guinea into the Philippines. In all cases, new immigrants appear to have mixed to some degree with existing populations. The integration of Southeast Asia into Indian Ocean trading networks around 2,000 years ago also shows some impact, with South Asian genetic signals present within some Sama-Bajau communities. After these initial migratory waves that occurred in the precolonial era, there were also modest scales of immigration from Europe and Latin America. among Filipinos.

== Older theories ==
=== Beyer's Wave Migration Theory ===
The most widely known theory of the prehistoric peopling of the Philippines is that of H. Otley Beyer, founder of the Anthropology Department of the University of the Philippines. Heading that department for 40 years, Professor Beyer became the unquestioned expert on Philippine prehistory, exerting early leadership in the field and influencing the first generation of Filipino historians and anthropologists, archaeologists, paleontologists, geologists, and students the world over. According to Dr. Beyer, the ancestors of the Filipinos came in different "waves of migration", as follows:

1. "Dawn Man", a cave-man type who was similar to Java Man, Peking Man, and other Asian Homo erectus of 250,000 years ago.
2. The aboriginal pygmy group, the Negritos, who arrived between 25,000 and 30,000 years ago via land bridges.
3. The seafaring tool-using Indonesian group who arrived about 5,000 to 6,000 years ago and were the first immigrants to reach the Philippines by sea.
4. The seafaring, more civilized Malays who brought the Iron Age culture and were the real colonizers and dominant cultural group in the pre-Hispanic Philippines.

There is no definite evidence, archaeological or historical, to support this migration theory, and the passage of time has made that more unlikely. Key issues with this theory include Beyer's reliance on 19th-century theories of progressive evolution and migratory diffusion that have been shown in other contexts to be overly simplistic and unreliable and his reliance on incomplete archaeological findings and conjecture.

His claims that the Malays were the original settlers of the lowland regions and the dominant cultural transmitter now seem untenable, no subsequent evidence has emerged to support his "Dawn Man", and improved bathymetric soundings have established that there was almost certainly not a land bridge to Sundaland, although most of the islands were connected and could be accessed across the Mindoro Strait and Sibutu Passage. Writing in 1994, Philippine historian William Scott concluded that "it is probably safe to say that no anthropologist accepts the Beyer Wave Migration Theory today."

A German scientist who has studied the Philippines, Fritjof Voss, has even argued that the present soundings are probably a generous overestimate of the earlier situation, as the Philippines have steadily risen over known geologic history.

=== Objections to the land bridges theory ===
In February 1976, Fritjof Voss, a German scientist who studied the geology of the Philippines, questioned the validity of the theory of land bridges. He maintained that the Philippines was never part of mainland Asia. He claimed that it arose from the bottom of the sea and, as the thin Pacific crust moved below it, continued to rise. It continues to rise today. The country lies along great Earth faults that extend to deep submarine trenches. The resulting violent earthquakes caused what is now the land masses forming the Philippines to rise to the surface of the sea. Dr. Voss also pointed out that when scientific studies were done on the Earth's crust from 1964 to 1967, it was discovered that the 35-kilometer- thick crust underneath China does not reach the Philippines. Thus, the latter could not have been a land bridge to the Asian mainland. The matter of who the first settlers were has not been really resolved. This is being disputed by anthropologists, as well as Professor H. Otley Beyer, who claims that the first inhabitants of the Philippines came from the Malay Peninsula. The Malays now constitute the largest portion of the populace and what Filipinos now have is an Austronesian culture.

Philippine historian William Henry Scott has pointed out that Palawan and the Calamianes Islands are separated from Borneo by water nowhere deeper than 100 meters, that south of a line drawn between Saigon and Brunei does the depth of the South China Sea nowhere exceeds 100 meters, and that the Strait of Malacca reaches 50 meters only at one point. Scott also asserts that the Sulu Archipelago is not the peak of a submerged mountain range connecting Mindanao and Borneo, but the exposed edge of three small ridges produced by tectonic tilting of the sea bottom in recent geologic times. According to Scott, it is clear that Palawan and the Calamianes do not stand on a submerged land bridge, but were once a hornlike protuberance on the shoulder of a continent whose southern shoreline used to be the present islands of Java and Borneo. Mindoro and the Calamianes are separated by a channel more than 500 meters deep.

=== Core Population Theory ===
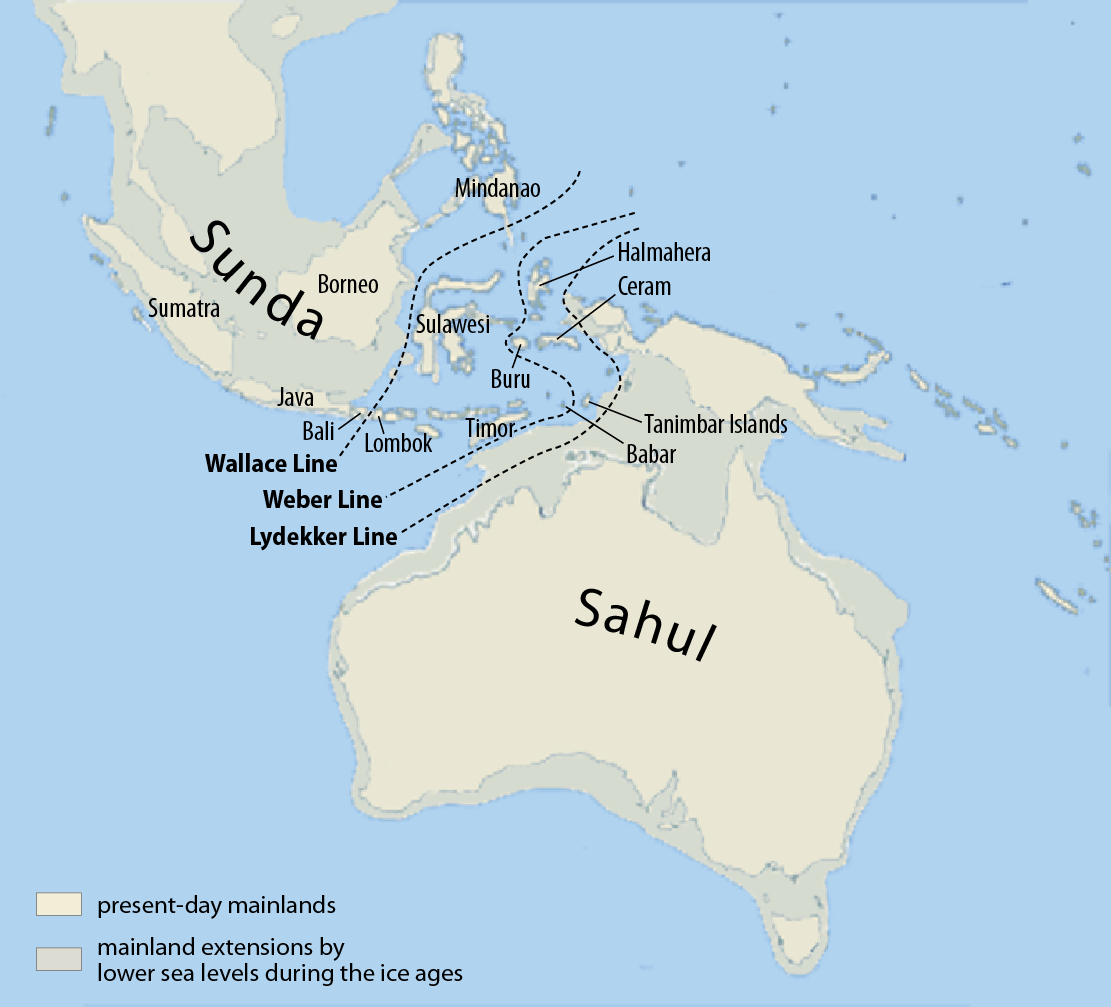
The Sahul Shelf and the Sunda Shelf today. The area in between is called "Wallacea".

A less rigid version of the earlier wave migration theory is the Core Population Theory first proposed by anthropologist Felipe Landa Jocano of the University of the Philippines. This theory holds that there weren't clear discrete waves of migration. Instead it suggests early inhabitants of Southeast Asia were of the same ethnic group with similar culture, but through a gradual process over time driven by environmental factors, differentiated themselves from one another.

Jocano contends that what fossil evidence of ancient men show is that they not only migrated to the Philippines, but also to New Guinea, Borneo, and Australia. He says that there is no way of determining if they were Negritos at all. However, what is sure is that there is evidence the Philippines was inhabited tens of thousands of years ago. In 1962, a skull cap and a portion of a jaw, presumed to be those of a human being, were found in Tabon Cave in Palawan.

The nearby charcoal from cooking fires have been dated to c. 22,000 years ago. While Palawan was connected directly to Sundaland during the last ice age (and separated from the rest of the Philippines by the Mindoro Strait), Callao Man's still-older remains (c. 67,000 B.P.) were discovered in northern Luzon. Some have argued that this may show settlement of the Philippines earlier than that of the Malay Peninsula.

Jocano further believes that the present Filipinos are products of the long process of cultural evolution and movement of people. This not only holds true for Filipinos, but for the Indonesians and the Malays of Malaysia, as well. No group among the three is culturally or genetically dominant. Hence, Jocano says that it is not correct to attribute the Filipino culture as being Malayan in orientation.

According to Jocano's findings, the people of the prehistoric islands of Southeast Asia were of the same population as the combination of human evolution that occurred in the islands of Southeast Asia about 1.9 million years ago. The claimed evidence for this is fossil material found in different parts of the region and the movements of other people from the Asian mainland during historic times. He states that these ancient men cannot be categorized under any of the historically identified ethnic groups (Malays, Indonesians, and Filipinos) of today.

Other prominent anthropologists like Robert Bradford Fox, Alfredo E. Evangelista, Jesus Peralta, Zeus A. Salazar, and Ponciano L. Bennagen agreed with Jocano. Some still preferred Beyer's theory as the more acceptable model, including anthropologist E. Arsenio Manuel.

== See also ==
- Austronesian languages
- Ethnic groups in the Philippines
