= Murillo Velarde =

Murillo Velarde may refer to:

- Pedro Murillo Velarde (1696-1753), Spanish Catholic priest, Jesuit and cartographer; see Archaeology of the Philippines
- Velarde map or Murillo Velarde map, a historical map of the Philippines
