= History of archaeology in the Philippines =

The history of archaeology in the Philippines, officially known as the Republic of the Philippines, has been affected by many significant figures and the multiple chronologies associated with the type of artifacts and research conducted over the years.

The Philippines have had a long legacy of Spanish colonization of over 300 years. To begin to understand the archaeology of the Philippines, colonization by the Spanish must be factored in and understood. As Carl Guthe puts, as he excavated the Philippines during the 1920s, "The Filipinos have been under Christian influence for such a long period that all recollection of pre-Spanish inhumations has passed." Thus, linking the past and present through Philippine archaeology can be an issue when it comes to understanding artifacts from before Spanish colonization.

In addition to Spanish Colonization, the Philippines have also suffered in more recent history from American colonization that still persists to this day. On December 10, 1898, Spain surrendered the Philippines to the United States through the Treaty of Paris. This began a long period of American colonization, which played a huge role in Philippine archaeology as it enabled American anthropologists to explore vast archaeological sites with profound evidence of human occupation and evolution. Later, archaeologists like H. Otley Beyer were able to put the Philippines in the archaeological record through events such as the 1904 St. Louis World's Fair, which initiated the development of archaeology in the Philippines.

== Significant figures in Philippine archaeology ==
=== H. Otley Beyer ===
H. Otley Beyer was a cultural anthropologist and archaeologist who founded Philippine archaeology and became head of anthropology at the University of the Philippines. His Waves of Migration Theory relied on phenotypic and linguistic variability. He explained how he believed that people migrated into the Philippines in "waves," with each wave getting lighter in skin color and more culturally sophisticated. Beyer's theory showed the first wave as the negritos (25,000–30,000 YBP), the second wave as the Indonesians (5,000–6,000 YBP), and the third wave as the Malayas (2,500 YBP).

Beyer conducted archaeological surveys in Luzon, Palawan, and the Visayan Islands and suggested that terraces were constructed as early as 2000 years ago.

=== Robert Fox ===
Robert Bradford Fox was an anthropologist and leading historian of the pre-Hispanic Philippines. He led excavations in 1958 at Calatagan, Batangas, where he found 505 graves in two sites. Fox also became the head of the Anthropology Division at the National Museum of the Philippines, where he led a research project in Palawan from 1962 to 1966. Fox later delivered the only Pleistocene human fossils found in the Philippines through his excavations at the Tabon Cave complex.

=== Wilhelm G. Solheim II ===
Wilhelm Solheim conducted the first archaeological excavations in the Philippines after World War II. His fieldwork was mostly conducted in mainland and island Southeast Asia, as well as the Pacific Islands. Solheim was a professor of Anthropology at the University of Hawaii from 1967 to 1991.

=== Stephen Acabado ===
Stephen Acabado is an anthropology professor at the University of California, Los Angeles. Acabado researches the relationships among Southeast Asian agricultural complexes, landscapes, and society. He has led research projects focusing on Ifugao, such as his Ifugao Archaeological Project.

== Traditional comparative chronologies ==
=== The Three-Age System ===
The Three-Age System is a common periodization system that divides history into the Stone Age, the Bronze Age, and the Iron Age. These periods have been used throughout European archaeology to label artifacts into recognizable chronology. Despite this periodization being common in archaeology elsewhere, the Philippines has adopted various comparative chronologies that more accurately and efficiently categorize artifacts throughout history.

== Comparative chronologies according to Victor Paz ==
=== Pre-archaeology: 19th century ===
According to Victor Paz, the Pre-Archaeology period is the longest among the five identified periods. As the name suggests, it is characterized as a time before archaeology as a discipline evolved. During this period, there was no evidence that antique material culture had any value. The exact dates of the pre-archaeology period are still debated, due to the discovery of human burial sites containing associated objects that demonstrate value.

=== Accidental Archaeology: 19th century to early 1920s ===
The Accidental Archaeology period is characterized by the beginnings of an antiquarian appreciation of the past regarding material goods. In this period, archaeology is still not quite a science, but rather served a purpose for other research pursuits that belonged in ethnographic and natural sciences. French naturalist Alfred Marche is the most prominent figure during this time and usually credited with being the first to conduct archaeological explorations and collect Philippine cultural goods. Marche collected not just for an antiquarian appreciation, but for a vested interest in exoticism. In 1881, he excavated human remains in the open sites in Marinduque and Catanduanes. He also found a number of other artifacts such as Chinese pottery, gold, wooden coffins, and burial urns. These artifacts were collected for museums in France.

Other examples belonging to this period are the few educated elite Filipinos such as Pardo de Tavera and the Calderon family, who started private collections in Manila.

=== Committed Archaeology: 1920s to mid 1960s ===
During the Committed Archaeology period, the National Museum of the Philippines made more serious attempts at directed archaeological research, uncovering information about settlement patterns, burial practices, and artifact assemblage. The Three-Age System was adopted during this period as the primary way to categorize archaeological findings, following an evolutionary approach that linked artifacts to the progression of human culture from "savagery" to "civilization."

=== Directed Archaeology: mid-1960s to late 1990s ===
The Directed Archaeology period saw the development of contemporary worldwide archaeological ethics standards, which disengaged archaeological research from its antiquarian origins, especially in regards to looting. There was also an increase in state support of archaeology practices and research projects, enabled by the strengthening of the National Museum of the Philippines via protective laws and an increase in resources. Research projects were led by private individuals and academic institutions in collaboration with the museum and resulted in the global interest of the Philippines.

=== Reflective Archaeology: late 1990s to present ===
The current period of archaeology is the Reflective Period, which articulates the ethics of archaeology, emphasizing respect for "private property" and an increase in state and private institutional support of archaeological research. Reflective Archaeology uses a multidisciplinary approach to answer research questions regarding origin, migration, trade patterns, and domestication practices of the Philippines. Archaeology today focuses on rewriting the colonial narratives that dominate the discipline, encouraging community involvement and the preservation of Filipino heritage.

== Comparative chronologies according to F. Landa Jocano ==
According to F. Landa Jocano, the comparative chronologies of history of the archaeology of the Philippines consisted of the Mythic Phase, Formative Phase, Incipient Phase, Emergent Phase, and Baranganic Phase (Jocano, 2001).

=== Mythic Phase ===
The Mythic Phase is from the beginning of time and focuses on the emphasis of myths as a source of creative information from previous generations including symbols that corresponds to religious beliefs, social practices, and political power. In the Philippines, this emphasis focused on two creation myths. The first focuses on the Yliguynes and their two gods, Kaptan and Magwayen. The second focuses on the Tinguines, who believed that in the beginning that there was only the sea and the sky. Jocano emphasizes how these myths reflect prehistoric Filipino culture as well as imagination and ancient thinking regarding human origin. Jocano shows the importance of acknowledging myths to further understand the "emergence and development of our prehistory culture" (Jocano, 2001, p. 102).

=== Formative Phase ===
The Formative Phase symbolizes cultural development from ca. 50,000 to 500 BC. Within this phase, the emergence of new archaeological artifacts such as the first human fossils in the Tabon Cave emphasizes human migration to the Philippines. Artifacts found from this phase support the idea that there was a developing culture in the region, which was capable of adapting to their environment. These types of artifacts showed that there were stone-tool, ceramic, and other economic industries that enabled tasks such as foraging, gathering, hunting, fishing, and horticulture. Jocano shows the true importance of this phase as it exemplified the unfolding of life and culture through the development of the stone tool and ceramic industries.

=== Incipient Phase ===
The Incipient Phase further emphasizes cultural development after the Formative Phase from ca. 500 BC to the first millennium AD. Throughout this phase, radical advancements within Filipino culture began to develop, with the emergence of effective agriculture and manufacturing to develop large societies. The appearance of metals allowed for better tools and nicer cultural objects such as beads, which allowed for stratification of class within society. Jocano further emphasizes the advancements made in the ceramic industry, which led to progress in trade and the eventual use of jar burials in the Philippines. The Incipient Phase was filled with the development of technology that allowed for Filipinos to adapt to their environment effectively, which further enhanced their culture and survival.

=== Emergent Phase ===
The Emergent Phase also emphasizes cultural development from the 1st century AD to the 14th century. In this phase, social and economic improvement appeared with the domestication of plants and animals, which allowed for expanded trade, communities, and population growth. Jocano explains how community growth, writing, political decentralization, and foreign trade allowed for social organization and better-developed culture during the prehistoric Philippines.

=== Baranganic Phase ===
The Baranganic Phase highlights the last period of cultural development from around the 14th century to the 16th century. The Barangay consisted of "the smallest sociopolitical unit of pre-colonial Philippine society," and exemplified the development of social stratification and complex economy (Jocano, 2001, p. 154). Within this period, accounts from Spanish Friars provided vast information of written records that allow people like Jocano to argue that this ancient Filipino society was incredibly complex, despite foreign powers, and greatly influenced how civilization is maintained today in the Philippines.

== Comparative chronologies according to Laure Lee Junker ==
Another comparative chronology of archaeology in the Philippines is the Bais/Tanjay Regional Chronology of Laure Lee Junker. Junker dissects her chronology into the following seven phases: the Edjek Phase, the Solamillo Phase, the Aguilar Phase, the Santiago Phase, the Osmena Phase, the Spanish Phase, and the Historic Phase.

=== The Edjek Phase ===
The Edjek Phase was ca. 2000–1500 B.C. This period in traditional chronology would be represented as the Neolithic Age.

=== The Solamillo Phase ===
The Solamillo Phase was ca. A.D. 0–500. This period in traditional chronology would be represented as the Iron Age, or Metal Age according to the long history model.

=== The Aguilar Phase ===
The Aguilar Phase was ca. A.D. 500–1000.

=== The Santiago Phase ===
The Santiago Phase was ca. A.D. 1100–1400.

=== The Osmena Phase ===
The Osmena Phase was ca. A.D. 1400–1600.

=== The Spanish Phase ===
The Spanish Phase was ca. A.D. 1600–1900.

=== The Historic Phase ===
The Historic Phase was from ca. A.D. 1600 to the present.

== Current archaeology ==
Much more research is needed to understand the latest period of Philippine archaeology. Current research focuses on rewriting colonial narratives and conserving Filipino heritage.

=== The National Museum of the Philippines ===
The mission of the National Museum of the Philippines is "to acquire, document, preserve, exhibit, and foster scholarly study and appreciation of works of art, specimens, and cultural and historical artifacts." The museum divisions include Anthropology, Archaeology, Cultural Properties, and Museum Education. The Archaeology division conducts research about the prehistory of the Philippines. The museum encourages community involvement by hosting events (music, art, science, workshops), teaching Filipino history by showcasing exhibits, and increasing awareness via newsletters and social media.

=== The Ifugao Archaeological Project ===
Stephen Acabado's Ifugao Archaeological Project is an example of a community archaeology project, which works with Ifugao communities to address archaeological issues regarding landscape and community formation. This project encourages community involvement to actively conserve heritage, working to date the Ifugao Rice Terraces and resolve colonial discourses regarding antiquity. Acabado uses archaeology to reveal factual evidence of originsa and colonial resistance to rewrite dominant narratives regarding Filipino origin, which are still currently based on Beyer's Waves of Migration theory.
