= Prehistory of Laguna (province) =

Laguna is a province of the Philippines found in Southern Luzon and features a freshwater lake and river valleys surrounded by arable land. This makes Laguna a good site for potential archeological sites. Its lake basin and fertile land makes for the area easily habitable, granting early settlers an accessible source of fish, eels, game and grain to support a thriving community of people. The coasts rivers of Laguna give the region a quick method of transportation and make trade with foreign merchants easier.

Laguna has been investigated multiple times by several archeological teams and has yielded several finds. Henry Otley Beyer had studied the shores of Laguna de Bay, particularly near the northern regions of Rizal and Manila. In his Outline Review of Philippine Archaeology by Islands and Provinces, he also made mention of the archeological potential of the eastern shores of the lake in which Pila lies. He pointed out that "it should turn out to be one of the most important centers of trade as well as of culture during the early part of the present millennium" for its strategic location.

== Excavations ==
=== The Esso – Elizalde Project ===
Following the expedition of Dr. Robert Fox in 1958 in the province of Batangas, the knowledge of the basics of archeology, such as the presence of artifacts under the ground and how to unearth these artifacts, quickly spread among the locals. The recovered artifacts, pottery, were sold as a source of income. In the 1960s, the towns of Laguna were also gripped in a frenzy of pot-hunting and yielded celadon, qingbai and various brown-glazed and red-underglaze wares.

Seeking to investigate the pot-hunting frenzy in Laguna, an archeological study was led in 1967 by Julita Fernandez and Amelia Rogel of the University of the Philippines - Anthropology Department alongside Dr. Fox and Avelino Legaspi from the Anthropology Division of the National Museum. The study was funded by the ESSO Standard Philippines and Mr and Mrs Manuel Elizalde and lasted from May to October of the same year. It consisted of 10 archeological excavations in Pila, Lumban, Balibago and Talim Island.

==== Findings ====
Three out of four sites yielded 153 graves, dated to approximately 12th to 15th century CE through recovered ceramics. The study yielded evidence of cremation in the sites, with remains either buried in soil or placed inside jars. Specimens recovered from the excavation include celadon dishes with fish motifs, celadon censers, qingbai and blue and white jarlets, small lead-glazed water droppers and teapots, qingbai double gourd vessels, large grey-glazed ewers, figurines of carabao with riders in plain and spotted qingbai, and brown wares of all sizes and shapes. Iron and glass bracelets, and colored beads and earrings that appear to be gold or copper were also part of the discovered.

250 to 300 of the recovered specimen were donated by the Elizaldes to Pila, alongside a building designated The Pila Museum. These were later transferred to a heritage building by the Pila Historical Society Foundation.

=== Locsin – University of San Carlos Archaeological Project ===
In the same year as the ESSO-Elizalde Project, a separate study was conducted by the University of San Carlos, alongside Leandro and Cecilia Locsin, supervised by Rosa C.P. Tenazas. The excavations in the barrio of Pinagbayanan, Municipality of Laguna started from the fourth of September, 1967 and lasted until the 19th of March, 1968. The excavated area had three sites, namely, Site I: Pinagbayanan/Agra, Site II: Pinagbayanan/Mendoza No. 1 and Site III: Pinagbayanan/Mendoza No. 2. Most of the artifacts discovered were collected on the first two months of excavation. Luckily, a few burials were uncovered by a typhoon in November 1967. Sites I and II had a total area of 2,720 square meters, that is, 170 4 x 4 squares and 241 burials.

==== Findings and Conclusions ====
The excavations yielded the following results: The area was primarily inhabited and/or used for burials by settlements from at least the 12th to 14th century AD. This period can be divided into three: Iron Age (Period I); Lower Sung (Period II); and Upper Sung/Yuan (Period III).

The earliest was the Iron Age. Three burials were associated with this period. Also, based on the distinct pottery types, it was considered to be the time before contacts with the outside world through trade with China begun.

A relatively long period was Period II. The sites were used as burial grounds for inhumation burials in this time. A distinct burial practice was the bundling of the corpse with grave goods.

On Period III, the sites were used for both habitation and burial. This was concluded because of the presence of net sinkers, spindle whorls, postholes, etc.

Artifacts discovered strongly support actual Chinese settlement in the area during the said periods. Recovered were water droppers/miniature pouring vessels which the Chinese had great appreciation for their beauty. Also, net sinkers molded into the male symbol and in one instance the female symbol, expresses the preoccupation with fertility and ancestor worship also evident in many parts of the Far East to the North during the Sung Period.

A great discovery was the practice of cremation in the area which had a form similar to the one practiced in China during approximately the same period. Although secondary burial was widespread in Southeast Asia, what makes this discovery unique was the concept of secondary cremation, which had limited distribution and was known in China, during the Sung period.

Thirty three out of the fifty five burials uncovered within the Period III level were cremation burials of two types (1) burial directly in a pit and (2) burial in a container. The second type was supported by a number of observations which include that a number of jars recovered had traces of charred skeletal remains believed to be human and the presence of grave goods, like ceramic pieces, inside the jars. The concept of secondary cremation was described as "after undergoing one of several processes of primary burial to allow time for the flesh to decompose, the bones were collected and burned in a ritual before the actual reburial". This is also supported by the fact that in primary cremations, large fragments of charred skeletal materials rarely occur where as in the excavation site, large fragments of bones were found. Another significant discovery, which may also support the concept of secondary cremation, was the presence of a Crematory Complex. It is a structure with three chambers which are not large enough to contain an average-sized adult corpse, in other words, it was used only for burning disarticulated skeletal remains.

On the people's way of living, other results imply that first, wet rice agriculture was practiced during this time. Also, with the presence of spindle whorls, cotton was grown and weaving was also practiced. The presence of net sinkers and with the fact that the area was near the lake, implies that they engaged in fishing, while hunting and animal husbandry was also exercised. Pigs were domesticated and animal remains show that horses were also present. Iron wastes and slag were also discovered indicating the production of iron tools and weapons.

Other artifacts discovered are the earthenware. Non-Iron Age types (under Periods I and II) fall under four types: (1) the Kendi (spouted variety), which in almost all cases had only one spout and one lug and generally squat; (2) the simple cooking pot, which had spherical body with a rounded bottom and everted lip rim; (3) rimless pots or bowls, characterized by having elliptical body which ends in a plain, slightly inturned lip rim; and (4) miscellaneous earthenware, which includes heavy stoves and pot covers. The pot covers are different from what we use today. They are usually concave, instead of being convex, and had a cylindrical handle at the center.

Also found are pottery disks which are associated with graves identified as children's graves. Thus the pottery disks are believed to have been playthings for children. Incidentally, pottery disks are also found in some excavations in Thailand and are said to have been "used in a game called Len Lum (playing holes)", wherein shallow holes slightly larger than the disk are made by twisting the disks down onto the ground and the players attempt to pitch the disk, into the hole, from a distance.
