= Prehistory of Sarangani =

Sarangani is found in Mindanao

Sarangani is a province located in the Mindanao region of the Philippines and has a total land area of 4,441.79 square kilometers. . Historically, Sarangani already had an established community even before the Westerners came. The early Sarangani society was greatly affected by the Indian and Muslim cultures, and the first inhabitants were the indigenous natives called

“Muna’To”, a native term meaning “the first people”. The Spaniards only managed to impose a minimal influence to the province, causing the preservation of the rich cultural heritage of the original settlers. By the American period, the area became a part of the Cotabato Empire and by 1966, a large part of it was incorporated in the province of South Cotabato. It was only changed on 1992, through the Republic Act No. 7228, making Sarangani an independent and separate province.

As of present times, the province of Sarangani upholds a great importance for the country in terms of culture. The culture of its ethnic tribes, such as the Manobo, the Ubo, and the Moro, are without comparison, and their preserved values and traditions can serve as reflections of what the early Saranguenos (or on a larger point of view, the early Filipinos) were in the past.

== Archaeological Findings and Discoveries ==
Sarangani, unknown to many, boasts one of the most important sites not only in the Philippines, but in the Southeast Asian region as a whole. There are three major archaeological sites in the province, all of which are caves situated in the town of Maitum, the last town bordering the province of Sultan Kudarat. Each one has their own contributions to the province's reputation as an important place for the country's archaeology.

=== Ayub Cave ===
The Ayub Cave was the first significant archaeological site discovered in Sarangani. The cave was named “Ayub” after Hadji Ayub, who is the owner of the property where the cave was located (Dizon 2002: personal communication). Ayub Cave is located approximately 1000m inland from the coastline facing the Mindanao Sea with an elevation of about 6m above the current sea level. That can be accessed via a coconut plantation that intersects the barangay road.

The municipality of Maitum is located in Sarangani Province – a province that was once a part of South Cotobato but on March 16, 1992, RA 7228 created the province of Sarangani. Its capital is Alabel. Maitum is one of seven municipalities that make up the province of Sarangani. The other municipalities are the capital Alabel, Glan, Maasim, Malapatan, Malungon, and Kiamba.

The site is located in Barangay Pinol, Maitum, hence its other name, Pinol Cave. The cave is located approximately 1000m inland from the coastline facing the Mindanao Sea with an elevation of about 6m above the current sea level.

Today the cave is now referred to as Pinol Cave, this time after the person who questioned the ownership of Ayub Cave (Ramos 2002: personal communication). The site was excavated in 1991 and instantly created a stir because of the exceptionality of the finds. The archaeologists found unique jars which were unlike the usual jars and pots discovered in other sites.

Like other jars, the jars of Ayub Cave once served as burial places, usually where the skeletal remains are transferred to. However, what makes these jars unique is their intricate design. Unlike their normal, round shape counterparts, the burial jars of Ayub Cave are more sophisticated and artistic, depicting the face and body of the person buried in the artifact. Also, the form of the jars follows the sex of the deceased person, with female remains placed in receptacles with breast like forms while males have penis-like projections at the base of the jar.

Unfortunately, most of the artifacts found in the cave were either destroyed or looted by treasure hunters. The remaining artifacts which were recovered are now displayed in the National Museum, while some are in the care of the local municipality of Maitum.

Two samples found in situ were successfully dated by AMS at Beta Analytic Inc., in Florida USA. The first sample, called Beta 83315, yielded a calibrated result of AD 70-370. The second sample, called Beta 83316, has a calibrated result of 5BC – AD 225.

==== Ayub Cave Assemblage ====
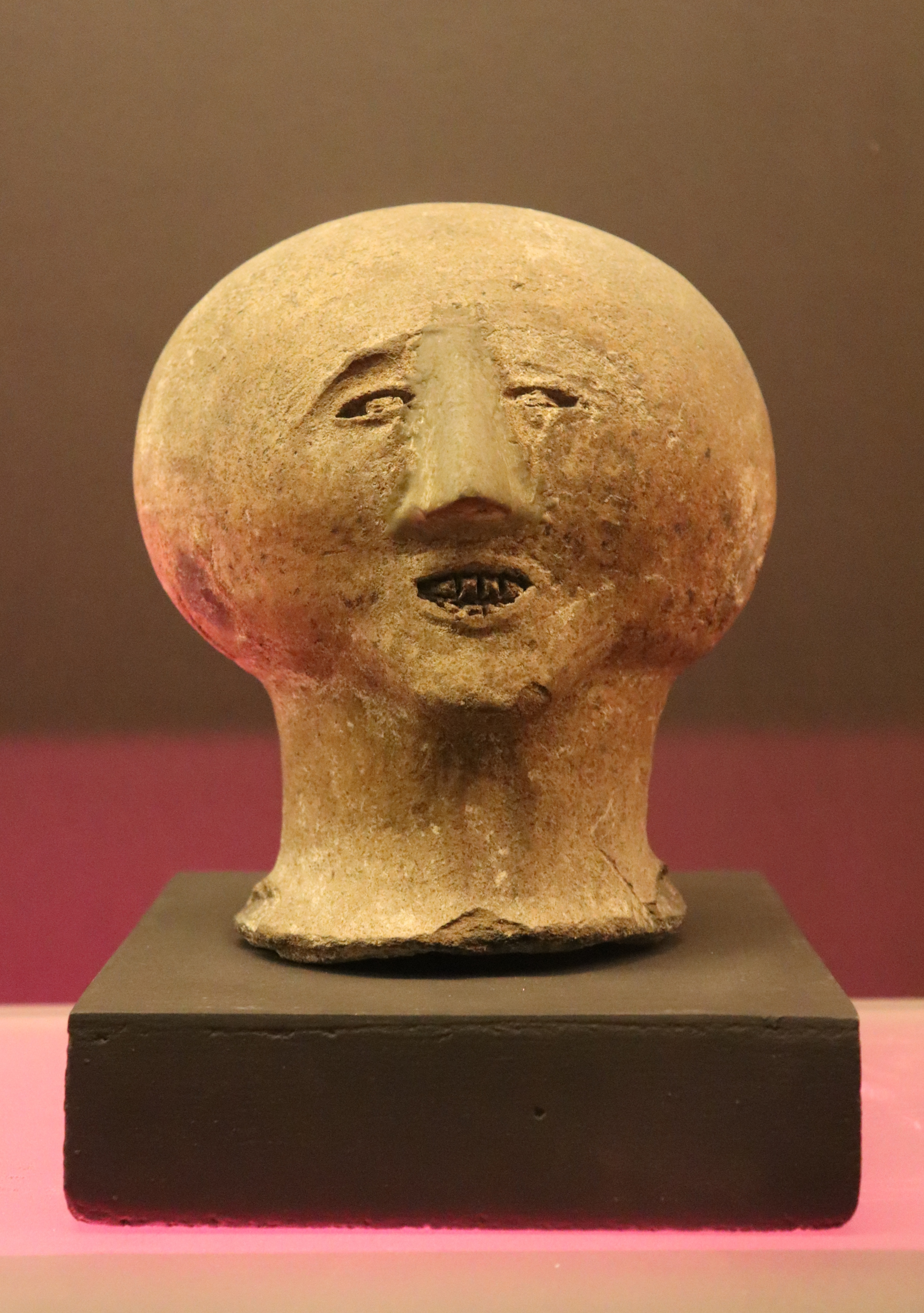
Anthropomorphic jar cover as displayed at the National Museum of Anthropology in Manila.

Typologically the designs from Maitum are characteristic of the Metal Age Period in the Philippines ca. 500 BC – AD 500. According to Dizon (1996: xi) in terms of design the earthenware assemblage is similar to those found in the archaeological sites of Kalanay in Masbate in Central Visayas and Tabon Cave in Palawan. Two samples found in situ were successfully dated by AMS at Beta Analytic Inc., in Florida USA. The first sample (Beta 83315) yielded a calibrated result of AD 70-370. The second sample (Beta 83316) has a calibrated result of 5BC – AD 225.

The Ayub Cave assemblage consists mostly of anthropomorphic earthenware burial jars, smaller earthenware ritual vessels, and a number of associated materials, namely, shell ornaments, beads, bones, and metal implements.

The discovery of the Maitum Jars caused great excitement because of their uniqueness in design. According to Dizon (1996), “no similar anthropomorphic types have emerged in any Philippine archaeological sites” compared to those recovered from Ayub Cave.

The collection of associated material cultural remains such as shell ornaments, glass beads and bracelets as well as iron blades found in this assemblage also shows that this ancient people were no different from others in distant parts of the world, as Egypt or Europe or much of Asia. They shared the same common concern over their dead, preparing for their burial and equipping them with things of this world for the next life.

The presence of burial offerings at the Maitum site indicates that these ancient people believed in an afterworld, where such goods were useful during the journey to the afterworld or in the afterlife itself [Ucko 1961:264]. These cave-remains, after a span of some two thousand years, serve as the only reminders of what had once been a symbolic activity.

Traces of such ancient beliefs can be seen in symbolic motifs that are found on funerary wares. Among the most common theme of transitions, water journeys and island-like afterworlds, seems to dominate funeral symbolism. This is noticeable in the Manunggul jar.

Meanwhile, the equally common theme of regeneration and growth expressed in symbols of agriculture and human fertility finds a parallel in the iron tools found in Ayub Cave and Jar 21, which feature the male sex organ.

The potters behind these burial jars and associated pots appear to have been keenly observant, as well as imaginative. This is apparent in the fine detailing of facial expressions and human features; the particularization of details, like pierced earlobes, various eye treatment and detailing of the teeth or inferring their loss from shrunken facial muscle and receding chins. Moreover, the depiction of enlarged earholes and painted ornamented designs on the body of the jar may indicate the use of jewelry. The perforations on the head may indicate hairstyles – receding hairline or balding. The traditions on the styling of secondary burial forms from non-anthropomorphic to anthropomorphic may have evolved through the years. It is uncertain whether both styles were contemporaneous, or which preceded the other, and whether only one group of people used the cave site coeval with one another from two or more periods coming from the same or various places, meeting only at Ayub cave.

=== Linao Cave ===
In 2002, another archaeological site was discovered in Maitum. It is a cave, discovered in Sitio Linao, Barangay Kiambing, thus getting the name Linao Cave. Like its predecessor, the site is unfortunately very much disturbed too, leaving no intact jars, only potsherds, again as a result of treasure hunting.

During the excavation period, old-time residents in the area also informed the archaeologists that the cave has seven chambers, the farthest having supposedly old drawings on the walls, but the National Museum Team, headed by Dr. Eusebio Dizon, were unable to reach the said chambers, because they were blocked by sandbags and timber.

Upon examination of the sherds, the archaeologists concluded that the pots were not anthropomorphic pots or used for burial. They suggested that the Linao Cave was somehow a ritual site, and that the pots were probably used for rituals.

Besides this, the fact that really makes the place special was once the recovered potsherds were carbon-dated, the result suggested that the potteries were much older than those in the Ayub Cave by at least a 1000 years, dating it to almost as old as 3000 years Before Present Time. Also, upon examination, the recovered artifacts, according to Dr. Dizon, seem to have similarities with some of the Sabah pots from Bukit Tengkorak. This is remarkable, since it would make the site very important in terms of explaining the past of ancient man in the Philippines.

The recovered artifacts are now on display in the National Museum.

=== Sagel Cave ===
Sagel Cave is the most recent archaeological excavation in the province of Sarangani. The site is located in Barrio Sagel, Barangay Pinol, Maitum, and was discovered in 2008. The discovery of the site was actually a coincidence – a bulldozer clearing off a side of the mountain exposed a cave system with numerous prehistoric jars and human remains.

By April of the same year, the site was immediately excavated. The results yielded a non-anthropomorphic jar burial of an adult, some pottery sherds, an iron knife and a bead made from fossilized shell. Also the recovery of human and animal bones prove that the cave was used as a burial site by its past inhabitants. There was also a bottle-shaped pendant made from fossilized shell, which was believed to be a burial good. The human bones found were revealed to be of the Homo Sapiens’ and the artifacts were dated to be of Metal Age (ca. 500 BC – 500 AD).

The site is more pristine than Ayub Cave. However, it is more delicate, since the opening of the cave site was very unstable. Because of that, only a few part of the small cave was explored, although there is a possibility that the said site still has some passages which are connected to other parts of the cave. At present, the artifacts are preserved at the National Museum.

== Importance to Philippine Archaeology ==
The Sarangani sites, as obvious as it seems, is very important to Philippine archaeology. It is a known fact that many are quite unaware to the existence of the sites and the finds associated with them. This should be changed, for there is much to learn from our past by simply analyzing the material remains from such sites, like the ones in the province of Sarangani.

The artifacts discovered in the Ayub Cave, for example, are great tools in understanding who the ancient Filipinos were. The detailed structure and the emotional faces of the anthropomorphic pots represent an amazing and magnificent way of the Filipino lifestyle. The modern Filipinos should be proud of it, because as of present times, no one else in the Southeast Asian region has this type of archaeological finds.

This uniqueness, coupled with the old age of the artifacts, also goes to show the early Filipinos arrived in the country in a much later date than what was already known. Further studies about the Maitum Cave Sites may even prove or disprove existing theories about ancient Filipinos. It may also answer the present-day questions regarding Philippine archaeology, which as of the moment is still a mystery.

Also, the case of these sites should be made known, as to expose the present condition of many cultural heritage sites in the country. The negative effects of the rampant scavenging of the treasure hunters/diggers should be made known to the average Filipino, so that they themselves can either refrain from damaging heritage sites or stop others from doing so. In this way, these sites will be preserved for the sake of the generations passed by and the generations yet to come.
