= Prehistory of Marinduque =

Marinduque: Heart of the Philippines

The provincial island of Marinduque is found in between Oriental Mindoro and Quezon Province at the Southern Part of Luzon. It is part of the Region IV-B provinces, along with (Occidental and Oriental) Mindoro, Romblon, and Palawan. Similar to the majority of the Philippines, the people of Marinduque use Tagalog as its main language, with hints of dialects from the nearby Bicol and Visayan provinces as well as from the locals themselves.

Marinduque is called "The Heart of the Philippines," as the shape of the provincial island is similar to that of a human heart. Its location in the arrangement of the archipelago is also similar to the anatomy of where the heart is in the human body.

== History and archaeological findings ==
During the Spanish colonization in the late 1500s, Marinduque was part of the Batangas Province. Later on, it became part of the province of Mindoro. Marinduque only became a province of its own during the American colonization. Its first government was established in Boac, now known as the province’s capital town.

=== Jagor Expedition ===
The pursuit for cultural discovery in Marinduque was pioneered by the German-Russian anthropologist Fedor Jagor in the 1860s when he discovered elongated skulls in one of the province’s caves. Similar skulls were also found in Cagraray and Albay. These were the very first findings of such skulls in the East, thus sparking interest in the West.

=== Marche Expedition ===
The first systematic exploration in Marinduque was done by the French explorer, Antoine-Alfred Marche, in 1881. With the help of his allies and the locals, Marche explored the Isle of Grottos (Island of caves). During his explorations, numerous jars, dishes, figurines, golden jewelry, bones, coffins and ceramics were unearthed in several parts of the province. These findings came mostly from Boac, Islet Tres Reyes, Bathala Cave, and Gasan. Most of the artefacts are currently contained in Musée du Quai Branly and Musée de L'Homme, both located in Paris, while some are in the Smithsonian Institution in Washington, D.C.

==== Notable discoveries ====
One of his notable discoveries would be the wooden coffins excavated from a sepulchral cave in Marinduque. These coffins had carvings of crocodile images in its lids, similar to those found in Nosy Loapasana, Madagascar.

Another would be his discovery of deformed skulls in the caves of Los Tres Reyes, Pamintaan and Macayan. These deformed skulls were similar to the ones discovered by Fedor Jagor in the 1860s. Such deformation in the skulls are a result of compression of the head, of a newborn child between two boards. This practice was done to make the head appear more elongated rather than round, and the forehead more flat, a feature considered as a “special mark of beauty” during the ancient times. Astoundingly, the same skull deformation was evident in those of ancient Mayan, Egyptian, and Incan people, despite not having any contact amongst each other.

Marche’s further excavations were due to his "intoxication" when he excavated the Pamintaan Cave, a cave believed to be a burial site. In here, several antiques, varying from Chinese urns, vases, gold ornaments, and such, were excavated.

A publication of Alfred Marche’s expedition in Marinduque provides evidence for the Morionistic culture of the province during the past. According to this publication, the locals before were very superstitious about places that were yet to be explored. In line with this, they tried to stop Marche from going into the caves, for they feared that he would be eaten by the aswang. Thus, when he came out safely during the first explorations, they believed that he had an "anting-anting" (a pendant or charm) in hand that protected him from the "aswang".

=== Chinese Junk Shipwreck ===
In 1982, the National Museum and the Marine Archaeology Unlimited, Inc. headed an excavation of a shipwreck about 40 m (130 ft)| below the surface in the southwest coast of Marinduque. The site was discovered by a local fisherman who was able to retrieve many ceramic pieces even without any diving equipment in the said site. It is believed that the ship was a Chinese trading galleon from the Ming dynasty. More than 1,100 pieces of artifacts from the site were collected, most of which are porcelain plates, jars, and stoneware^{[10]}. The stoneware jars notably resembled the jars containing dragon designs excavated from the Pamintaan cave. Pinggan, the barangay closest to the shipwreck site, was allegedly named after the findings of the porcelain plates (pinggan- Filipino word for plate). A re-excavation was done years later in the middle of the Pinggan coast and Gaspar Island.

=== San Isidro Cave and Subterranean River ===
A hidden cave with a subterranean river was recently discovered in Sta. Cruz, Marinduque. The San Isidro cave system contained small waterfalls gushing from the rocks, stalactites and stalagmites of varied colors and shapes, freshwater shrimps, eels, swallows, and a king cobra that guards the entrance. The cave is yet to be discovered and excavated.

=== Pilapil Cave ===
An excavation in Pilapil Cave was made by Alfredo E. Evangelista in 1961. In this excavation, local artefacts were associated with Sung and Yuan sherds. These archaeological records provide evidence for early Chinese contact in the Philippines.

== See also ==
- Article title
- http://www.tourism.gov.ph/SitePages/InteractiveSitesPage.aspx?siteID=20
- “Maritime Archaeology: A Reader’s Substantive and Theoretical Contributions” by Lawrence E. Babits and Hans Van Tilburg
- http://marinduquegov.blogspot.com/2009/07/marinduques-newest-discovery-hidden.html
