= Sibutu Passage =

- Location within the Philippines
- Location: Sulu Archipelago (Philippines) and Borneo
- Coordinates: 4°49′55.92″N 119°41′35.88″E
- Type: strait

Sibutu Passage is a deep channel some 18 miles (16 nmi; 29 km) wide that separates Borneo from the Sulu Archipelago. It has a deep sill allowing entry of deep water into the Sulu basin while connecting the Sulu Sea with the Sulawesi Sea that feeds from the Pacific Ocean by the Mindanao Current.

Although H. Otley Beyer argued in favor of a settlement of the Philippines across land bridges during the last ice age, modern bathymetric soundings have shown that the centers of the Sibutu Passage and the Mindoro Strait are both deep enough that they probably still existed at that time, although the Sulu and other Philippine Islands beyond were one connected island. If verified, therefore, the Callao Man would have needed to have crossed the open sea to reach the islands.
