= F. Landa Jocano =

Filipino anthropologist (1930–2013)

- Born: Felipe Landa Jocano; February 5, 1930; Cabatuan, Iloilo, Philippine Islands
- Died: October 27, 2013 (aged 83)
- Education: Central Philippine University (BA); University of Chicago (MA, Ph.D.)
- Occupation: Anthropologist
- Known for: Significant body of work within the field of Philippine cultural anthropology, widely recognized as "the country's foremost cultural anthropologist" during his lifetime. Proponent of the Core Population Theory of the peopling of Southeast Asia

Felipe Landa Jocano (February 5, 1930 – October 27, 2013) was a Filipino anthropologist, educator, and author known for his significant body of work within the field of Philippine Anthropology, and in particular for documenting and translating the Hinilawod, a Western Visayan folk epic. His eminence within the field of Philippine anthropology was widely recognized during his lifetime, with National Artist F. Sionil Jose dubbing him "the country's first and foremost cultural anthropologist"

Jocano served as Professor Emeritus at the Asian Center of the University of the Philippines and executive director of PUNLAD Research House, Inc. and a professor in University of the Philippines. He has authored numerous books on various aspects of Filipino Society and Culture.

== Biography ==
=== Early life and education ===
Jocano was born in Cabatuan, Iloilo in 1930 - the ninth of eleven children born to Eusebio Jocano, a persevere farmer, and Anastacia Landa.

He finished his elementary studies at a public school in Iloilo and then ran away to Manila because his family could not afford to send him to high school. He eventually graduated from the Arellano High School in Manila, working his way through to graduation. After this, he tried to enroll in some college courses, but distractions and an illness forced him to return to his native Iloilo in 1954, where we eventually earned a Bachelor of Arts degree from the Central Philippine University in 1957.

=== Return to Iloilo, interest in folklore, and work at the National Museum ===
It was during Jocano's period of return to Iloilo that he first developed an interest in folklore. This interest brought him into contact with Robert Fox, then an anthropologist working for the National Museum of the Philippines, who got him a job as "research aid" at the museum - doing mostly janitorial work. Through his work ethic and by taking the initiative to draw the museum director's attention to his typing skills, Jocano was eventually moved to the museum's typing pool.

Work at the National Museum inspired Jocano to write a series of articles discussing Philippine legends surrounding plant and animal life, which was published in the Manila Times. The Department of Education took note of the series and asked Jocano if it could be published in "Diwang Kayumanggi", a high school teaching supplement regularly issued by the Department of Education at the time. Jocano's condition for the reprinting was that the publication would also indicate his position as "janitor." As a result, Jocano was promoted from "Research Aid" to "Scientist 1", although his job description remained the same.

=== University education and teaching career ===
Taking advantage of a study grant, Jocano went to the University of Chicago to earn a master's degree in Anthropology, graduating in 1962. He took up a teaching position there and later got his Ph.D. in Anthropology from the same university.

Jocano eventually decided to come home to teach at the University of the Philippines, where he served until his retirement 31 years later. In that time, he served among other functions, as Chairman of the UP Department of Anthropology, director of Philippine Studies Program at the UP Asian Center, Dean of the UP Institute of Philippine Studies, and head of Asian Center Museum Laboratory.

Jocano's association with the University of the Philippines continued after retirement, as he was named professor emeritus of the UP Asian Center.

Jocano's work as a scholarly writer was prolific and wide-ranging. His study of ethnology expanded into numerous aspects of Filipino life - from folklore and pre-colonial history to international relations, to the rural community and urban slum life. He was one of the first to even suggest the ethnological study of the development of the Philippines' corporate culture.

In 1999, he was awarded a special citation for a lifetime of writing and publishing on various aspects of Philippine culture by the Manila Critics Circle.

== Pioneering use of Participant Observation in Philippine settings ==
As one of the earliest Filipino-born researchers to receive proper scholarly training in anthropology, Jocano became a pioneer in the use of Participant Observation as a research methodology in Philippine ethnographic research, applying it in numerous places, including Capiz, Ilocos, and notably, the urban poor community of Looban, Sta Mesa in Manila.

Jocano's work in the Slum of Looban was seminal in its insistence on "living in the community and taking part, whenever possible in the activities of the members, observing what they do and checking the observed behaviour in terms of what they say and do." Earlier research on slums mostly relied on the use of questionnaires, which Jocano dismissed as inappropriate for studying urban poor society: "One cannot possibly go up and paper and ask questions without arousing suspicions especially among street corner gang members."

National Artist F. Sionil Jose recounts that some of Jocano's adventures in Participant Observation resulted in memorably humorous episodes:

"At one time, he got himself hired as a motel boy while doing a study on sexuality among Filipinos. He confided that he surprised some of his colleagues who patronized these motels. From that study, Pepe gave me a chapter which I published in my journal, Solidarity. Right at the press, some 20 copies disappeared. The issue was sold out in a couple of months, I had to order a reprint. As one academic told me — it was a landmark article — the first "scholarly pornography."

And at one time, a relative accosted him in Quiapo where he was actually begging at the church door to gather data on his study of the urban poor. The relative was so shocked to see him there in tatters, he had to drag away the protesting scholar with the promise to help him."

== "Hinilawod: Tales From The Mouth of The Halawod River" ==
One of Jocano's earliest major contributions to the field of cultural anthropology and a significant contribution to recorded Filipino folk literature was the documentation of the epic poem Hinilawod (which means "Tales From The Mouth of The Halawod River").

The epic recounts the story of the exploits of three Sulodnon demigod brothers, Labaw Donggon, Humadapnon and Dumalapdap of ancient Panay. Jocano, assisted by a radio technician from the Central Philippine University, convinced Sulod folk chanters Ulang Udig and Hugan-an to recount the story, and allow them to record it on cassette. The process of acquiring this permission took years, from Jocano's first contact with Ulang Udig in 1955 to the recording of Hugan-an's 30-hour performance of the epic in 1957. Jocano eventually also published the text in his book "Hinilawod: Adventures of Humadapnon Tarangban I" (The epic was once again recorded in 1999, by researcher Alejo Zata, working among Sulod natives who still performed it and for whom the epic was still very much an active part of their culture.)

== Core Population Theory ==
Jocano was one of the first scholars to suggest alternatives to H. Otley Beyer's Wave Migration Theory of migration to the Philippines.

His Core Population Theory proposed that there weren't clear discrete waves of migration, but a long process of cultural evolution and movement of people. The theory suggests that early inhabitants of Southeast Asia were once of the same ethnic group with similar culture, but eventually - through a gradual process driven by environmental factors - differentiated themselves from one another.

Other prominent anthropologists like Robert Fox, Alfredo E. Evangelista, Jesus Peralta, Zeus A. Salazar, and Ponciano L. Bennagen agreed with Jocano. However some still preferred Beyer's theory as the more acceptable model, including anthropologist E. Arsenio Manuel.

== Personal life ==
Jocano married Adria Payad and they had two children, Felipe Jr. and Lizabeth. He died in 2013 at the age of 83.

== Partial list of published books ==
- Jocano, F. Landa; Hugan-an (2000). Hinilawod: Adventures of Humadapnon Tarangban I. Quezon City: Punlad Research House, Inc. ISBN 971-622-010-3.
- Jocano, F. Landa (1999). Management by Culture (Revised ed.). Quezon City: Punlad Research House, Inc.
- Jocano, F. Landa (1999). Towards Developing a Filipino Corporate Culture (Revised ed.). Quezon City: Punlad Research House, Inc.
- Jocano, F. Landa (1999). Working With Filipinos: A Cross-Cultural Experience. Quezon City: Punlad Research House, Inc.
- Jocano, F. Landa (1998). Filipino Prehistory: Rediscovering Precolonial Heritage. Quezon City: Punlad Research House, Inc. ISBN 971-622-006-5.
- Jocano, F. Landa (1998). Filipino Indigenous Ethnic Communities: Patterns, Variations, and Typologies. Quezon City: Punlad Research House, Inc.
- Jocano, F. Landa (1998). Filipino Social Organization: Traditional Kinship and Family Organization. Quezon City: Punlad Research House, Inc.
- Jocano, F. Landa (1997). Filipino Value System: A Cultural Definition. Quezon City: Punlad Research House, Inc.
- Jocano, F. Landa (1995). Special Studies on Filipino Values: Five Cases. Quezon City: Punlad Research House, Inc.
- Jocano, F. Landa; Dr. Paz Mendez (1991). Culture and Nationhood. Quezon City: Punlad Research House, Inc.
- Jocano, F. Landa (1987). Social Organization in Three Philippine Villages: An Exploration in Rural Anthropology. Quezon City: Punlad Research House, Inc.
- Jocano, F. Landa (1983). Hiligaynon: An Ethnography of Family and Community Life. Quezon City: Punlad Research House, Inc.
- Jocano, F. Landa (1983). Ilocano: An Ethnography of Family and Community Life. Quezon City: Punlad Research House, Inc.
- Jocano, F. Landa (1982). A Heritage We Can Be Proud Of. Quezon City: Punlad Research House, Inc.
- Jocano, F. Landa (1976). San Antonio: A Study of a Tagalog Fishing Village in Laguna Lake. Quezon City: Punlad Research House, Inc.
- Jocano, F. Landa (1975). Slum as a Way of Life. Quezon City: Punlad Research House, Inc.
- Jocano, F. Landa; Dr. Paz Mendez (1974). Filipino Family in Its Rural and Urban Orientations. Quezon City: Punlad Research House, Inc.
- Jocano, F. Landa (1973). Folk Medicine in a Philippine Community. Quezon City: Punlad Research House, Inc. ISBN 971-622-015-4.
- Jocano, F. Landa (1969). Growing Up In A Philippine Barrio. Quezon City: Punlad Research House, Inc.
- Jocano, F. Landa (1969). Outline of Philippine Mythology. Quezon City: Punlad Research House, Inc.
- Jocano, F. Landa (1968). Sulod Society. Quezon City: Punlad Research House, Inc.
- Jocano, F. Landa (2001). Filipino Worldview: Ethnography of Local Knowledge. Quezon City: Punlad Research House, Inc. ISBN 971-622-005-7.
