= Shell tools in the Philippines =

Shell tools, in the archaeological perspective, were tools fashioned by pre-historic humans from shells in lieu of stone tools. The use of shell tools during pre-historic times was a practice common to inhabitants of environments that lack the abundance of hard stones for making tools. This was the case with the islands surrounding the Pacific, including the Philippines. Shells were fashioned into tools, as well as ornaments. From adzes, scoops, spoons, dippers and other tools to personal ornaments such as earrings, anklets, bracelets and beads. These different artefacts made of shells were unearthed from various archaeological sites from the country.

== Shell tools in the Philippines ==
=== Production and manufacturing ===
Shell adzes were made by percussion flaking and grinding. A piece of shell was extracted from the main shell by either direct percussion flaking or possibly by sticking against an anvil underneath as in bipolar percussion flaking. The final shaping and finishing work was done by either grinding the shell against a wet abrasive surface such as sandstone or by grinding against loose wet sand placed on a hard surface. There are two locations on a giant clam that produces the largest pieces of shell. One is at the hinge and the other is at the ribs. Sections cut from these locations provide the thickest pieces of shell and the largest adzes.

The shells of giant clams were fashioned into large spherical beads with holes drilled end to end at the center while pendants for the ear were ground from cone shells. Perforations were drilled at the center of the disk. Bracelets and anklets were both made from giant clams and cone shells. Shell bracelets made from the top shoulder of the body whorls of cone shells (Conus litteratus) are characteristic of the Late Neolithic Age. The natural spiral found along the shoulders of the shell serves as a decorative motif.

== Evidences ==
=== Duyong Cave Artifacts ===
The oldest known ornaments made from cone shells were found in the early 1960s in the grave of an adult male in Duyong Cave in Palawan. A shell disk with a hole in the center was found next to his right ear and a disk with a hole by the edge was found on his chest. The shell ornaments were dated 4854 B.C.

Duyong Cave, near the Tabon Caves of Palawan's western coast (Philippines) produced a "Neolithic Burial" with four Tridacna shell adzes and two different types of shell ornaments as well as other types of shell tools. The calibrated Carbon 14 date for the burial is 3,675 - 3,015 B.C. and 4,575 - 4,425 B.C. for a nearby fire hearth that also had shell debris associated with it.

==== Duyong Shell Adze ====
Manufactured from the hinge line of a giant clam (Tridacna gigas), the shell adze was found associated with a Neolithic burial assemblage in Duyong Cave, Quezon, Palawan. This shell tool is similar to the shell adzes recovered in Okinawa, Japan. Shells were used as tools in the Pacific as a replacement for hard stones which were not available on the islands. The presence of shell adzes not only in Palawan but also in Tawi-Tawi is very significant in the study of movements of people from the insular Southeast Asia to the Pacific. This shell tool is similar to the shell adzes recovered in Micronesia and Ryukyu Islands in Okinawa, Japan.

=== Manunggul Shell Scoop ===
The Manunggul Shell Spoon is a concave utensil with a sharp point at one end and a figure at the other end. The latter has a right extremity that forms to what appears like an arm with five digits. The left extremity and the head are missing. The outer surface of the body whorl near the figure has an angular shoulder. This shell spoon is not bilaterally symmetrical.

=== Mataas Shell Scoop ===
The Mataas shell scoop is a concave utensil with a sharp point at one end and a figure at the other end. The latter has a right extremity that forms to what appears like an arm with five digits. The left extremity and the head are missing. The outer surface of the body whorl near the figure has an angular shoulder. This shell scoop, recovered in Cagraray Island, Albay is not bilaterally symmetrical. Shell scoops made from the body whorl of Turbo marmoratus first appeared in the Late Neolithic Period at Manunggul Cave, Quezon, Palawan.

== Continued Use ==
Up to the Metal Age, shells were the major material for the manufacture of both tools and ornaments but shell technology attained its highest development during the Neolithic Period. At present, the people of Palawan living near Tabon Caves still fashion bracelets from shells. The boring and polishing of the shell ornaments is done with stone tools.

Shells were found to be useful during pre-historic times when they provided an alternative material for the production of tools which made the development of pre-historic humans possible. These tools were found in various sites which suggests the vast reaches of its utility. Even up to the present many cultures and traditions still make use of these shells as either tools or ornaments. Although the use of shells as tools may have become just a ceremonial practice but its use as ornamentation still persists.
