= Tabon Man =

Oldest modern human remains from the Philippines

Tabon skullcap
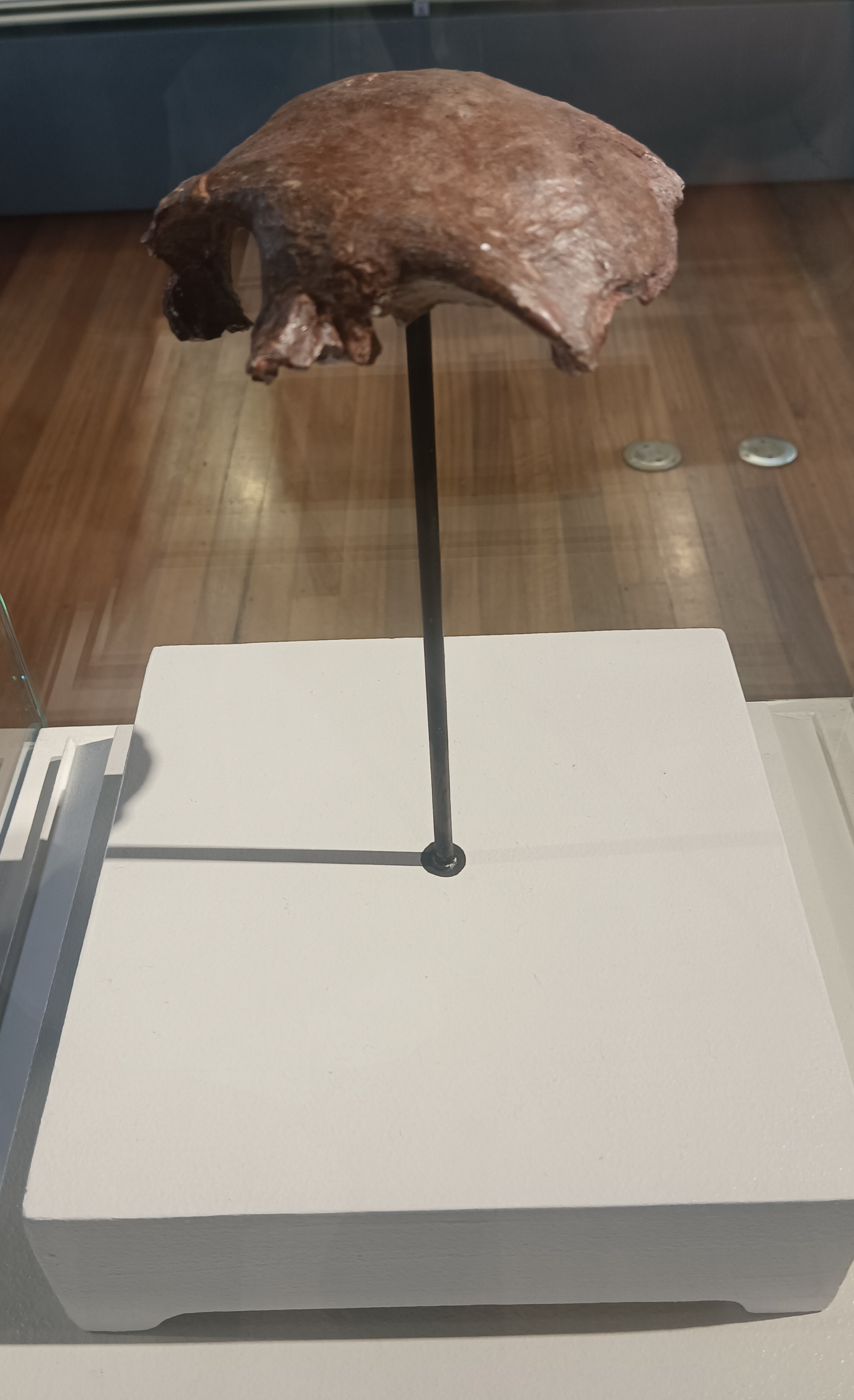
- Skull cap of a young female found during the 1962 excavation of Tabon Cave
- Catalog no.: P-XIII-T-288
- Common name: Tabon skullcap
- Species: Homo sapiens
- Age: 16500±2000 years
- Place discovered: Tabon Caves, Quezon, Palawan, Philippines
- Date discovered: May 28, 1962
- Discovered by: Robert Bradford Fox

Tabon tibia fragment
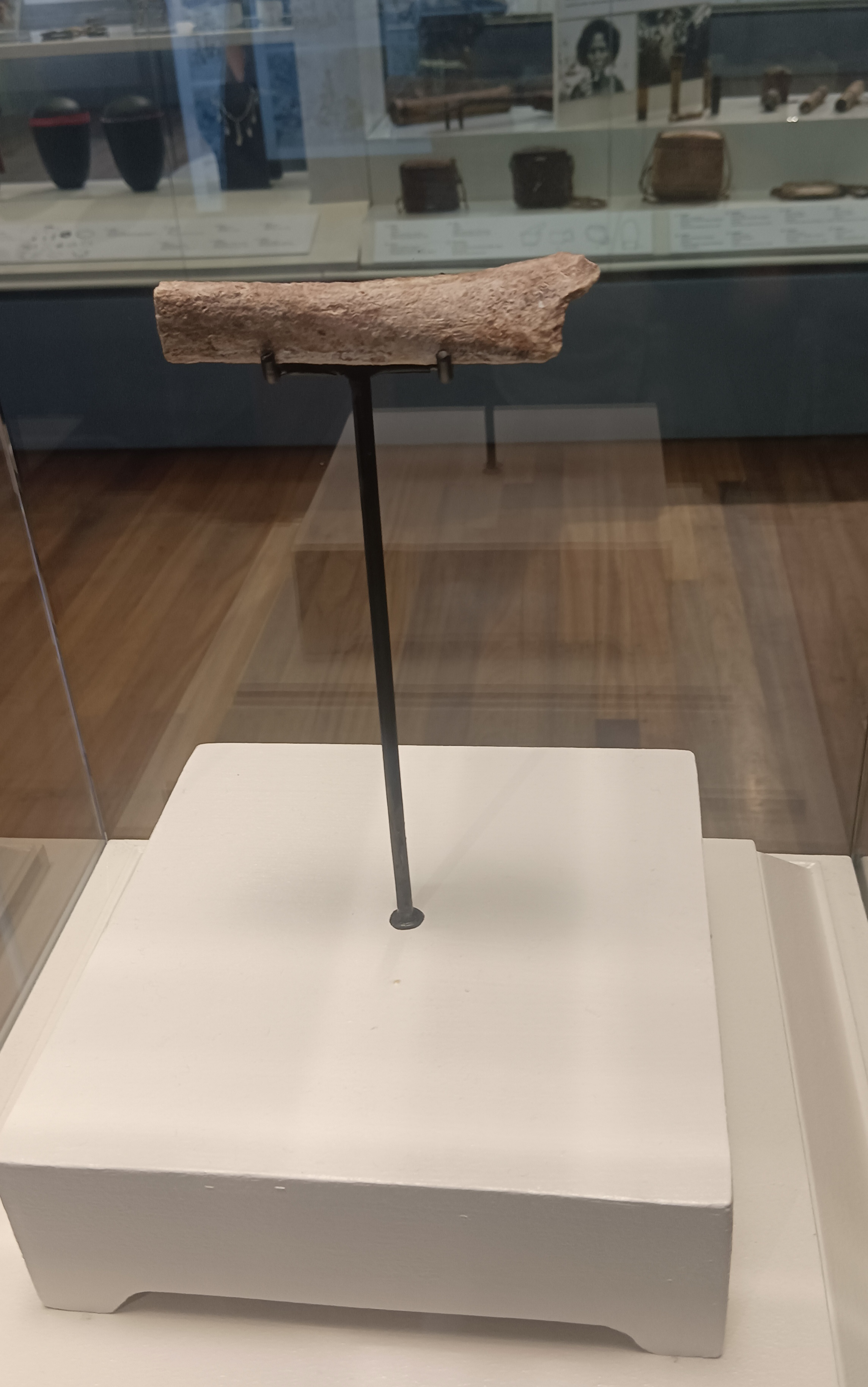
- Tibia fragment found during the 2000 re-excavation of Tabon Cave
- Catalog no.: IV-2000-T-197
- Common name: Tabon tibia fragment
- Species: Homo sapiens
- Age: 47000±11000 years
- Place discovered: Tabon Caves, Quezon, Palawan, Philippines
- Date discovered: 2000

Tabon Man refers to remains discovered in the Tabon Caves of Lipuun Point in Quezon, Palawan, in the Philippines. They were found by Robert B. Fox, an American anthropologist of the National Museum of the Philippines, on May 28, 1962. The fossilized fragments of a skull of a female and the jawbones of three individuals, dating back to 16,500 years ago, were the earliest known anatomically modern human remains in the Philippines. (Note: Human remains found in 2007 in the Callao Cave in northern Luzon, dating to at least 67,000 years ago, were initially thought to belong to modern humans. However, they were reclassified as a distinct species (Homo luzonensis) in 2019, with a 2023 study pushing the dating further back to at least 134,000 years ago.) (Note: Additionally, butchering marks found on an ancient nesorhinus fossil in Rizal, Kalinga, provided evidence that the Philippine archipelago was inhabited by a yet-unspecified hominin species (presumably Homo erectus) about 709000±68000 years ago.)

== Fossils ==
The Tabon Cave complex appears to have been a kind of Stone Age factory, with both finished stone flake tools and waste core flakes having been found at four separate levels in the main chamber. Charcoal left from three assemblages of cooking fires has been carbon-14-dated to roughly 7,000, 20,000, and 22,000 BCE. The right mandible of a Homo sapiens, dating to 29,000 BC, was discovered together with a skullcap. It is considered to be the earliest skullcap of modern humans found in the Philippines and is thought to have belonged to a young female. The Tabon mandible is the earliest evidence of human remains showing archaic characteristics of the mandible and teeth. The Tabon tibia fragment, a bone from the lower leg, was found during the re-excavation of the Tabon Cave complex by the National Museum of the Philippines. It was sent to the National Museum of Natural History in France to be studied. An accelerated carbon dating technique revealed a dating of 47000±11000 years ago, making it the oldest human fossil recovered in the complex.

The Tabon Cave complex is named after the Tabon scrubfowl (Megapodius cumingii), which deposited thick hard layers of guano during periods when the cave was uninhabited, so that succeeding groups of toolmakers settled on a cement-like floor of bird dung. About half of the 3,000 recovered specimens examined were discarded cores of a material that had to have been transported from some distance; this indicates that the inhabitants were engaged in tool manufacture. The Tabon fossils are considered to have come from a third group of inhabitants, who worked the cave between 22,000 and 20,000 BCE. An earlier cave level lies so far below the level containing cooking fire assemblages that it must represent Upper Pleistocene dates such as 45,000 or 50,000 years ago. Anthropologist Robert Fox, who directed the excavations, deduced that the Tabon Cave complex acted as a human habitation for a period of 40,000 years, from 50,000 to 9,000 years ago. In total, around 483 human remains were found in the expeditions of 1962 and 2000.

Physical anthropologists who have examined the skullcap agree that the remains belonged to modern humans, Homo sapiens, as distinguished from the mid-Pleistocene Homo erectus species.

== Location ==
The Tabon Cave complex is a series of caves situated in a limestone promontory at Lipuun Point in southwestern Palawan. It spans 138 hectares and used to be an island, but now, a mangrove forest connects it to mainland Palawan. There are roughly 218 caves, 38 of which are of archaeological and anthropological importance. Lipton Point is made up of 25 million-year-old limestone and is composed of large rocky domes, deep cliffs, and steep hills. In this area, cave occupation of a sporadic or temporary nature by modern humans seems to be indicated in the early Holocene. In the earlier Holocene, several sites show more intensive or frequent occupation. Local people appear to have been strongly focused on land-based, riverine, and estuarine resources, and in many cases, the sea is known to have been many kilometers away from the cave sites. In 1972, Presidential Proclamation No. 996 protected the Tabon Caves complex and Lipuun Point from deforestation and destruction. It was declared as a "Site Museum Reservation" under the administration of the National Museum and is preserved for present and future generations.

== Paleoenvironment ==
Although the Tabon Cave complex is just a few minutes walk from the sea, the lack of marine shells from early cultural deposits in this cave supports the concept that there was a substantial land shelf around the time of the Last Glacial Maximum, when estimates place sea levels at 130 m (430 ft) below present or possibly lower. The appearance of marine shells in middens in other caves on Lipuun Point from c. 7000 BP, and especially in later periods, suggests increasing focus on marine resources in the area in general; the abandonment of the Tabon Cave complex just before this time may be related to sea level rise. The potential relationship between Tabon Cave travertine and pre-Late Glacial Maximum wetter climates sees some support from recent research on vegetation sequences in north Palawan. Radiometric dating of a fireplace around 32,000 old indicates that the region was surrounded by a prevalent C3-type forest tempered by savannah woodland with grassland in between. The Tabon Caves would have been far inland during the late Pleistocene, and Reynolds (1993) has suggested that culturally, such caves would have been marginal during phases of low sea level, when currently submerged areas would have been the focus for human settlement. Over time, there is increasing evidence for occupation of caves associated with rising sea levels, and at Lipuun Point from c. 7000 BP, for a more maritime focus; however, the Tabon Caves complex was abandoned before this date.

== Tabonian culture ==
Stone tools, fossils, and earthenware have been found in different caves within the complex. In Liyang Cave, large jars filled with human remains were discovered; the cave is believed to have been an early human burial site. Within Tabon Cave, chert flakes and chopping tools, evidence of early humans being food gatherers and hunters, were found.

In 2023, indirect evidence of basket/tying material-making were found on stone tools dating to around 33,000 to 39,000 years ago. The distribution of use–wear on these artefacts is the same as that observed on experimental tools used to thin fibres, following a technique widespread across Southeast Asia at the time.

== See also ==
- List of human evolution fossils
  - Homo luzonensis
- Timeline of Philippine history

== Bibliography ==
- Bautista, Angel P. (2004), Tabon Cave Complex
- Ikawa-Smith, Fumiko (1978), Early Paleolithic in SOuth and East Asia, Paris: Mouton Publishers, ISBN 978-3-11-081003-5
- Tabon Cave, Palawan, National Museum of the Philippines, 2014, archived from the original on May 12, 2016
- Tabon Cave Complex, National Museum of the Philippines, 2014, archived from the original on February 25, 2021
