= Alfredo E. Evangelista =

Filipino archeologist (1926–2008)

Alfredo Evangelista
- Born: September 22, 1926; Davao City, Insular Government of the Philippine Islands, U.S.
- Died: October 18, 2008 (aged 82); San Pedro, Laguna, Philippines
- Occupation: Archeologist

Alfredo E. Evangelista (September 22, 1926 – October 18, 2008) was a Filipino archeologist and former director of the Anthropology division of the National Museum of the Philippines.

== Biography ==
Alfredo Esguerra Evangelista was born in Davao City on September 22, 1926. He completed his primary and secondary education in Davao City. His parents, Catalino N. Evangelista from Pangasinan and Filomena S. Esguerra from Dumaguete City, initially did not support the idea of him becoming an archaeologist; instead, they wanted him to be a lawyer.

He was married to Perfecta Gonzales.

He continued to head the Anthropology Division of the National Museum of the Philippines until his retirement as its deputy director in 1989.

Alfredo E. Evangelista died at his home in San Pedro, Laguna, on October 18, 2008, at the age of 82.

== Educational Background ==
Evangelista obtained his bachelor's degree in history from the University of the East in 1953. He earned a master's degree in anthropology in 1959 from the University of Chicago under the Fulbright Program. He joined the National Museum of the Philippines following his graduation from Chicago.

Evangelista's first encounter with archaeology occurred at the University of the East, where Wilhelm Solheim taught a Social Science course. This encounter introduced Evangelista and many other Filipinos to the subject.

In November 1949, while an undergraduate student, Evangelista and his classmate Arsenio Manuel were chosen by Wilhelm Solheim to participate in archaeological digs supervised by Professor H. Otley Beyer. Beyer and his team excavated sites from the Bondoc Peninsula to the Batungan Mountain range in Masbate, where they uncovered pottery specimens dating back to the Neolithic age.

== Works and contributions ==
Evangelista came into contact with archaeology in 1951 when he was a student of Wilhelm Solheim, who taught anthropology. Evangelista joined Solheim's team when he asked for volunteers to accompany him to Batungan Mountain in Masbate, and he later defined this as the moment when his passion for archaeology began. Solheim's wife asked the Director of the National Museum, Dr. Quisumbing, if Evangelista could be made a Laboratory Helper. During the Masbate undertaking, to which they returned in 1953, they excavated the Makabog Burial-Jar Site. Evangelista also assisted Solheim when they uncovered the Kalanay Cave site in 1951, and they worked together for the entire excavation in 1951 and 1953.

In 1955, Evangelista excavated a site in Arroceros Forest Park in Manila, although no published reports are found. In 1956, Evangelista and his fellow National Museum researcher, Robert Fox, undertook an archaeological excavation in Bato Caves, Sorsogon. During the excavation they found a burial jar and a stone tool assemblage.

In 1957, Evangelista excavated Carrangla in the province of Nueva Ecija. The site was a probable Neolithic jar burial site, known to have lithic tools, but no porcelain, stoneware or metal was found. According to Solheim: "So far inland in northern Luzon has always been a puzzle."

From August to September 1961, Evangelista attended the Tenth Pacific Science Congress in Honolulu, Hawaii. He attended a Philippine conference in late November, where he talked about archaeology in the Philippine Islands, its growth, development, and also its current status and problems. In December, Evangelista represented the Philippines at the International Conference on Asian Archaeology in New Delhi, India, where he also presented his findings from the Philippines which indicated trading relations with Indian, Chinese and Thai sources.

From July 1973 to August 1991, Wilhelm Solheim often visited him in the directors office and saw that he was running the museum without an official position. After his retirement in 1991, Evangelista taught at the University of Santa Thomas.
