= Robert Bradford Fox =

American historian (1918–1985)

Robert Bradford Fox (1918–1985) was an anthropologist and leading historian on pre-Hispanic Philippines.

Fox was born in 1918 in Galveston, Texas. He earned a BA from the University of Southern California and an MA from the University of Texas. After moving to the Philippines in 1946, he returned to the US to earn a Ph.D. from the University of Chicago.

In 1958, Fox led a National Museum team in conducting extensive excavations on two sites at Calatagan, Batangas, in what may be considered the first systematic excavation involving the National Museum in the country. His report, published in 1959, was based on artifacts and information derived from 505 graves in two sites known as Kay Tomas and Pulong Bakaw. In the 1960s, by then the head of the Anthropology Division of the National Museum of the Philippines, he led a six-year archaeological research project in Palawan, focusing mainly on the caves and rockshelters of Lipuun Point in the southern part of the island. Its most outstanding site is the Tabon Cave complex, the large main cave delivered the only Pleistocene human fossils found in the Philippines to date. The fossil finds include a skullcap, jaw bones, teeth and several other fragmented bones. Dubbed the "Tabon Man", the finds represent more than just one individual. Their age has been determined using radiometric dating, giving dates between 16500 ±2000 B.P for the skull cap and 48,000 ±11,000 B.P. for a tibia fragment.

Fox actively served the National Museum of the Philippines from 1948 to 1975. In 1975, while serving as consultant to the Philippine President on anthropological matters and as Dean of Brent School in Baguio, Philippines, he had a stroke which impaired his speech and right arm, preventing him from pursuing his teaching and research work. Subsequent strokes left him confined to home until his death in 1985. Besides his service with the National Museum, Fox taught at the University of the Philippines and served as Presidential Assistant for National Minorities. An obituary appeared in The Journal of Asian Studies.

== Partial bibliography ==
- Fox, Robert B. (1967), Pre-history of the Philippines.
- Fox, Robert B. (1970), The Tabon Caves. Archaeological Explorations and Excavations on Palawan Island, Philippines., National Museum.
- Fox, Robert B. (1978), "The Philippine Paleolithic", in Fumiko Ikawa-Smith (ed.), Early Paleolithic in South and East Asia, Mouton, pp. 59–85 ISBN 90-279-7899-9, ISBN 978-90-279-7899-8.

== See also ==
- Tabon Caves
