= Cultural achievements of pre-colonial Philippines =

The cultural achievements of pre-colonial Philippines include those covered by the prehistory and the early history (900–1521) of the Philippine archipelago's inhabitants, the pre-colonial forebears of today's Filipino people. Among the cultural achievements of the native people's belief systems, and culture in general, that are notable in many ethnic societies, range from agriculture, societal and environmental concepts, spiritual beliefs, up to advances in technology, science, and the arts.

== Summary of achievements ==
The following are the notable achievements of the natives of the pre-colonial archipelago between the 16th century to the 9th century, and most likely even farther. Many of the achievements have been lost or retrofitted due to more than three centuries of colonial rule beginning in the middle of the 16th century and ending in the middle of the 20th century.

- Development and expertise in Indigenous martial arts and warfare
- High respect for the natural world, including the spiritual realms and its beings, which are all seen as part of all the affairs of every life on earth, thus envisioned as an interconnected web, where one action affects the other, whether directly or indirectly
- Development of an organized system of communities, with laws enacted to promote social welfare and to protect nature, the spirits, and the people
- Expansion of Indigenous educational systems and writing systems through focusing on belief systems, epics, and other mediums that exhibit good values of an egalitarian society
- Widespread literacy in the Indigenous writing systems, such as the Baybayin writing system, by both men and women.
- Sociable culture based on peace pacts, maritime and land journeys, communal gatherings, and respect towards ethnic differences
- Solving problems and wars through a variety of mediums such as divine intervention, sacred peace pacts, public consultations, and community interference
- Development of craft innovations used for non-agricultural and non-martial tasks such as textiles, pottery and ornaments, with respect to the sustainability of sources and the environment and its wildlife
- Development of Indigenous culinary and healing arts, including medicinal practices and its associated objects and ingredients that were sustainably sourced due to respectful cultures directed to the natural world
- Enhancement of the fine arts focusing on folk literature, calligraphy, performing arts, and craft arts, among many other forms
- High respect for equal rights, notable in the matriarchal societies of pre-colonial ethnic groups, which includes the legality of divorce, equal stand on decision-making from any gender, retention of names after marriage whether women or men, equal suitability of any work for any gender

== Agriculture ==
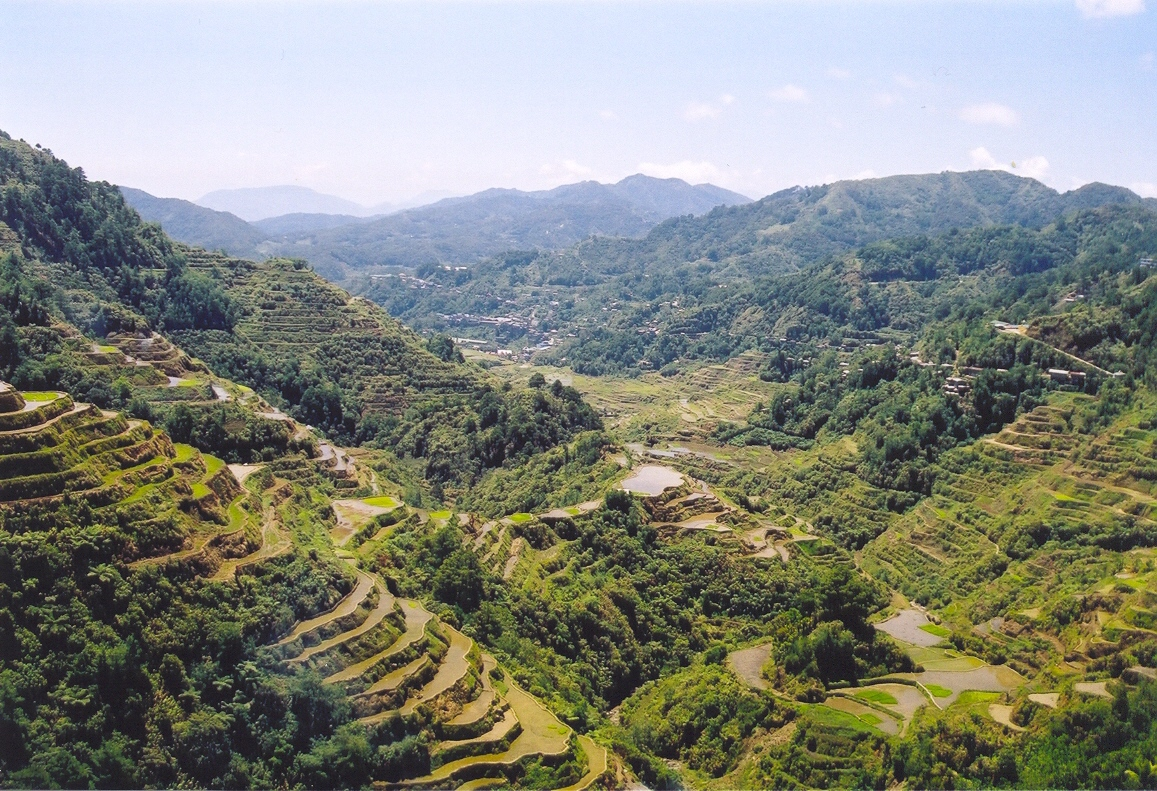
The Banaue Rice Terraces are part of the rice terraces of the Philippine Cordilleras

Pre-colonial Philippine societies relied more on swidden agriculture than intensive permanent agriculture. For example, in pre-colonial Visayas, the staple crops such as rice, millet, bananas and root crops were grown in swiddens (kaingin). While rice was highly valued and was the preferred food, the most common food all year round were actually root crops, and in some areas the only available crop for most of the year were root crops such as taro and yam. The historian William Henry Scott also noted that pre-colonial Visayan farmers neither knew the plow nor the carabao before the arrival of the Spaniards while the anthropologist Robert B. Fox described the Mangyans of Mindoro as sedentary agriculturalists who farm without the plow and the carabao. In fact, it is well known among historians that the plow technology and the harnessing of the domesticated carabao for plowing were introduced and disseminated by the Spanish friars to finance the colonial enterprise, a fact which is often elided in most Philippine nationalist histories. Similarly, the building of the rice terraces of the Cordilleras started around 1650 and coincided with the arrival of the Spaniards in northern Luzon; this notion is supported by archeological evidence collected from five major sites (Old Kiangan Village, Hapao, Nagacadan, Batad, and Banaue) by the Ifugao Archeological Project, thus falsifying the previously accepted notion that the rice terraces of the Philippine Cordilleras have a 2000-year-old origin. The anthropologist Stephen Acabado noted that the adoption of wet-rice agriculture in the Cordillera highlands and the subsequent landscape modification for terraced wet-rice cultivation were part of the strategy of resistance of the highlanders from the Spanish conquest, as the modified landscape served as zones of refuge.

William Henry Scott also noted that the swiddening techniques employed by the pre-colonial Visayans were not destructive, as evidenced by the fact that most of the Visayan settlements around that time were permanent. The people did not see the need to resort to cutting into virgin woodland each time but due to the balance between the population and the available land available to them, reuse of previously abandoned swidden areas which underwent forest regeneration was possible.

== Martial arts and weaponry ==
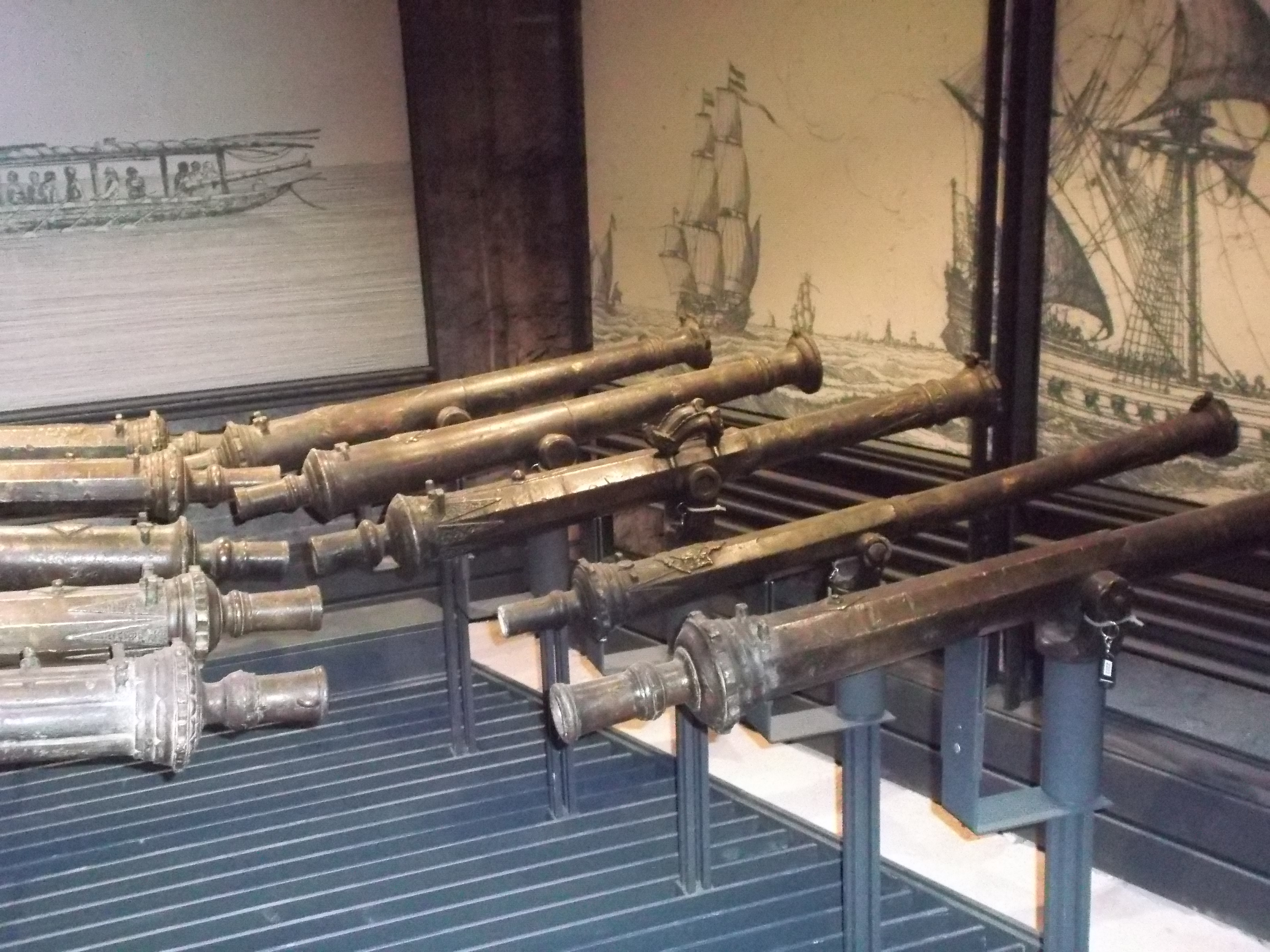
Collection of Philippine lantaka in a European museum

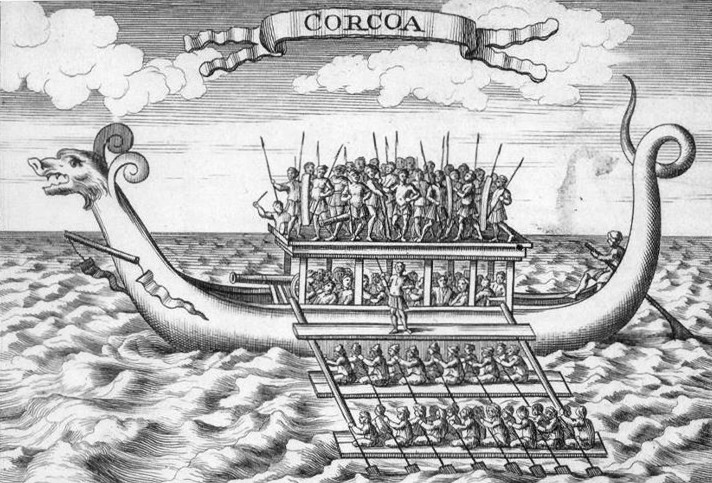
18th-century engraving of a Philippine karakoa, two lantaka can be seen mounted on the deck

The most intimate weapon wielded by pre-colonial inhabitants of the Philippines was the balaraw, a dagger with a double-edged leaf-shaped blade and a cross-shaped hilt which at times was used as a protection against wrist cuts. They are typically 20-25 centimeters long, although there were smaller versions given to youngsters since even a boy felt naked without one.

Pre-colonial Filipinos use two kinds of swords for combat, the kris and the kampilan. The kris (also called in Visayan as kalis) is a double-edged blade, which can be either completely straight (called sundang) or completely wavy (called kiwo-kiwo). The kris blades were forged from layers of different grades of steel, which gave them a damascened appearance. The Visayan kris was considered inferior compared to those from Mindanao and Sulu, and these in turn were less esteemed compared to the imports from Makassar and Borneo. The blade of the kampilan on the other hand is long and straight with a single edge which widens to a dual point. Like the kris, it was coated with poison before combat and the propagated fiction that an arcane alchemy was used to render the kampilan blade poisonous certainly increased its market value. The kampilan was never manufactured by the Visayan smiths but imported from Mindanao. Those with access to foreign imports also possessed Japanese swords (or katana) as weapon of war.

For protection, they wielded padded armor and carabao-hide breastplates, and long narrow shields called kalasag, or round bucklers called palisay. People who had access to foreign imports may also possess the Chinese peaked helmet, also called kupya or tangkulog in Tagalog.

The Bornean arquebus called astinggal (etymologically derived from Malay istinggar, ultimately from Portuguese espingarda) was also known by the pre-colonial Filipinos, however the Spaniards never faced any in their encounters in Luzon as they did in Mindanao. Such arquebusses on the other hand, did appear in Palawan through contacts with Borneo, as recorded by Antonio Pigafetta.

While historical and archeological evidences suggest that the pre-colonial inhabitants of the Philippines were a metal-using people, they did not possess the metallurgical knowledge of locally forging war cannons. The archeological researcher Eusebio Dizon noted that the pre-colonial Filipinos were capable of forging the small cannons, called lantakas, although they are not used for warfare but as ornaments for interior decoration. As far as current archeological data is concerned, pre-colonial Filipinos were not capable of founding the heavy European-style cannons used in sixteenth-century warfare. Despite this, lantakas did find a place in Philippine warfare, as witnessed for example by the soldiers of Juan de Salcedo during the conquest of Luzon.

== Education and writing ==
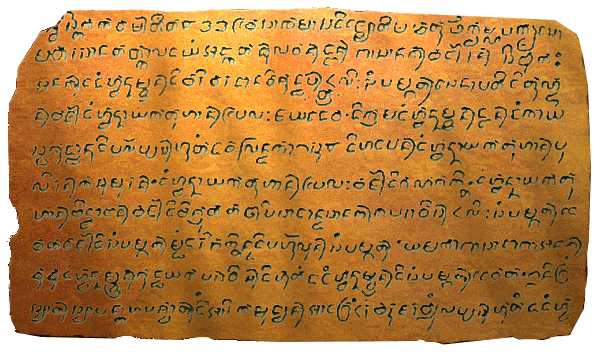
Laguna Copperplate Inscription (c. 900), a thin copperplate document measuring less than 8×12 inches in size, shows heavy Hindu-Malayan cultural influences present in the Philippines during the 10th century

Early chroniclers, who came during the first Spanish expeditions to the islands noted the proficiency of some of the natives, especially the chieftain and local kings, in Sanskrit, Old Javanese, Old Malay, and several other languages. A Jesuit priest wrote in 1604 that "So accustomed are all these islanders to writing and reading that there is scarcely a man, and much less a woman, who cannot read and write in the letters proper to [Luzon]". A Spanish magistrate wrote in 1609: "Throughout the islands the natives write very well using [their letters]... All the natives, women as well as men, write in this language, and there are very few who do not write well and correctly".

== Maritime culture and aquaculture ==
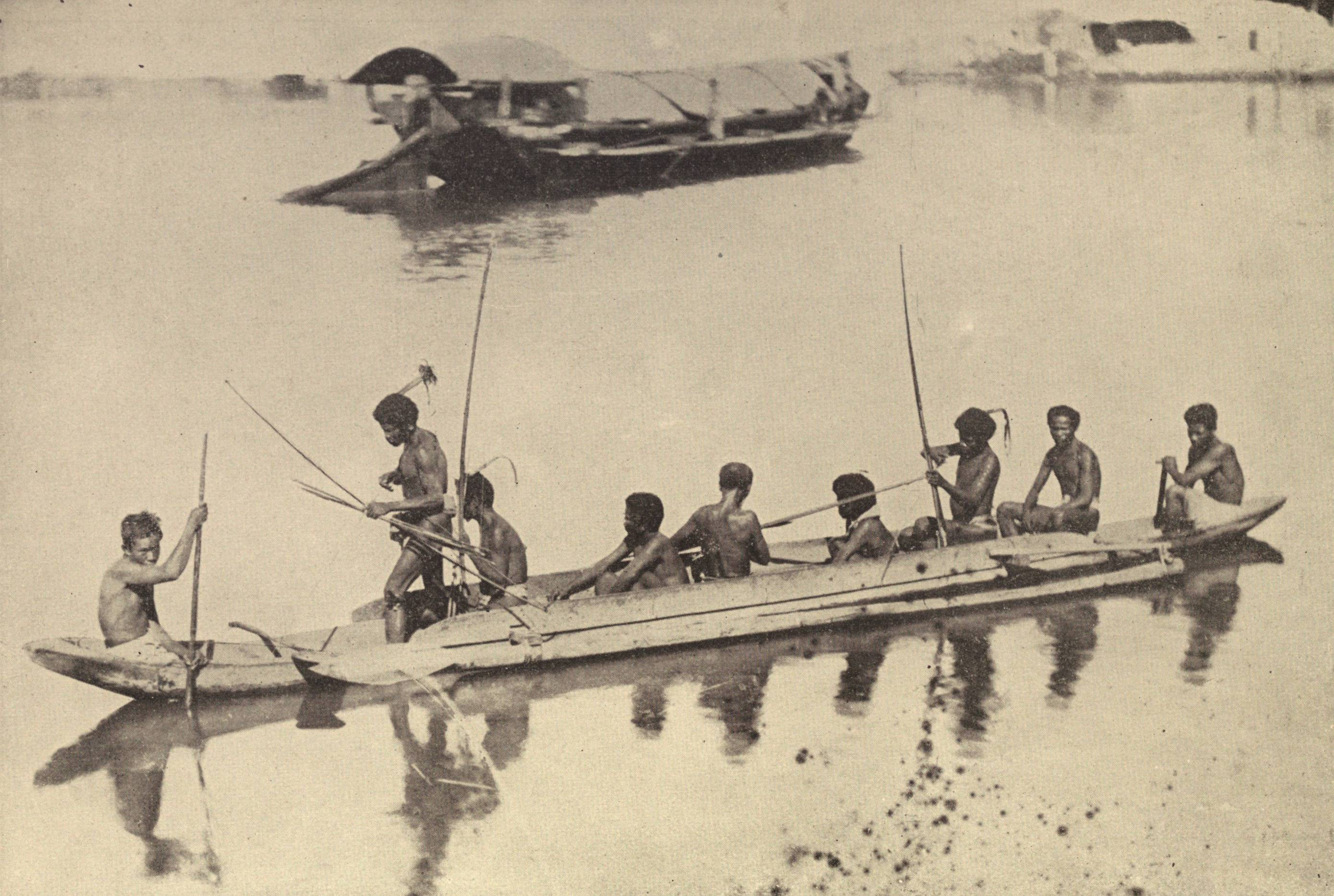
Native boats and outriggers as depicted in The history and conquest of the Philippines and our other island possessions; embracing our war with the Filipinos by Alden March, published in 1899. Caption (cropped out) read: "Boats of the upper type were used to land the U.S. troops at Manila. One of those in which the Astor Battery landed sank in the surf just before reaching shore. The natives carried the men ashore on their shoulders. The lower boat is a fisherman's craft used by the Negritos, who shoot fish in the clear water with bows and arrows."

Indigenous people of the Philippines, being descendants of the balangay-borne Austronesian migrants from Maritime Southeast Asia, were known for their navigational skills. Some of them used compasses similar to those used among maritime communities of Borneo and traders of China, although most had no need for such devices. In modern times, some fishermen and traders in the Visayas, Mindanao, Sulu and Palawan are still able to navigate long distances over open water without the use of modern navigational instruments. Philippine ships, such as the karakao or korkoa were of excellent quality and some of them were used by the Spaniards in expeditions against rebellious tribes and Dutch and British forces. Some of the larger rowed vessels held up to a hundred rowers on each side besides a contingent of armed troops. Generally, the larger vessels held at least one lantaka at the front of the vessel or another one placed at the stern. Philippine sailing ships called praos had double sails that seemed to rise well over a hundred feet from the surface of the water. Despite their large size, these ships had double outriggers. Some of the larger sailing ships, however, did not have outriggers.

Communities of the ancient Philippines were active in international trade, and they used the ocean as natural highways. Ancient peoples were engaged in long-range trading with their Asian neighbors as far as west as Maldives and as far as north as Japan. Some historians proposed that they also had regular contacts with the people of Western Micronesia due to it being the only area in the Oceania that had rice crops, tuba (fermented coconut sap), and a tradition of betel nut chewing when the first Europeans arrived there. The uncanny resemblance of complex body tattoos among the Visayans and those of Borneo also suggest some connection between Borneo and ancient Philippines. Magellan's chronicler, Antonio Pigafetta, mentioned that merchants and ambassadors from all surrounding areas came to pay tribute to the king of Sugbu (Cebu) for the purpose of trade. While Magellan's crew were with the king, a representative from Siam was paying tribute to the king. Miguel López de Legazpi also wrote how merchants from Luzon and Mindoro had come to Cebu for trade, and he also mentioned how Chinese merchants regularly came to Luzon for the same purpose. People from the region enjoyed extensive trade contacts and immigration with other cultures, such as Indians, Arabs, Koreans, Japanese, Vietnamese, Cambodians, Thais, Malaysians, and Indonesians.

Aside from trade relations, Indigenous Filipinos were also involved in aquaculture and fishing. The natives made use of the salambao, which is a type of raft that utilizes a large fishing net which is lowered into the water via a type of lever made of two criss-crossed poles. Night fishing was accomplished with the help of candles made from a particular type of resin similar to the copal of Mexico. Use of safe pens for incubation and protection of small fry from predators was also observed, a method that interested the Spaniards at that time.

== Mining and Adornment ==
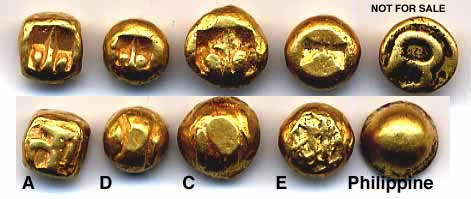
Piloncitos was the currency in pre-colonial times. Gold was prized for many reasons, one of which is for teeth ornamentation such as the case of the gold-scale teeth of the Bolinao Skull, the Calatagan teeth, and a Pigafetta account of the gold-dotted teeth of Butuan's ruler.

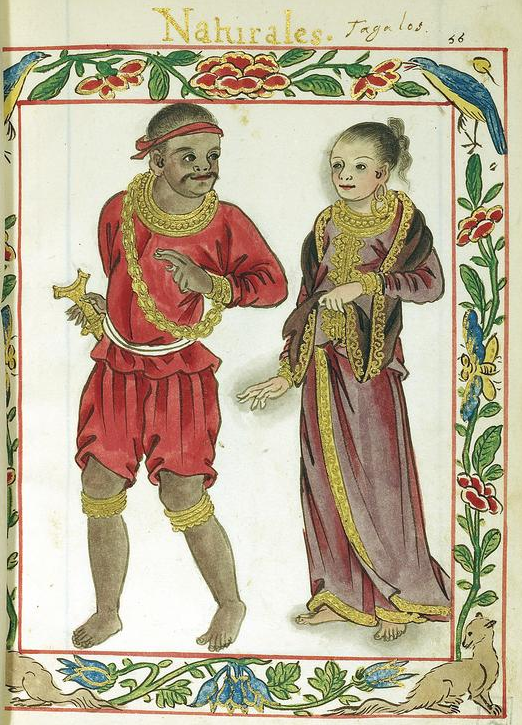
A couple from the nobility class in pre-colonial Philippines draped in gold.

Mining in the Philippines began around 1000 BC. Early Filipinos worked in various mines containing gold, silver, copper and iron. Jewels, gold ingots, chains, bangles, calombigas and earrings were handed down from their ancestors and passed from generation to generation.

The extensive use of gold during early Philippine history is well-documented, both in the archeological record and in the various written accounts from precolonial and early Spanish colonial times. Among the most prominent of these portrayals was that of the Boxer Codex (c. 1590), which portrayed members of the elite from various peoples in the Visayas and Luzon. Gold was used for various decorative and ceremonial items, as clothing, and also as currency.

Gold was readily available throughout the Philippine archipelago, and gold items were valued as symbols of power and markers of elite status, although studies of grave artifacts suggest that these items were not as valued in precolonial Philippines as traded ornaments were. Gold was plentiful enough that local elites did not feel the need to acquire large amounts of it, and only sought it as the need arose, by trading with settlements which produced it through low intensity mining.

Gold dagger handles, gold dishes, tooth plating, and huge gold ornaments were also used. Death masks made of gold dating back to precolonial times have also been discovered in the Philippines. In Laszlo Legeza's "Tantric elements in pre-Hispanic Philippines Gold Art", it is mentioned that gold jewelry of Filipino origin was found in Ancient Egypt. According to Antonio Pigafetta, the people of Mindoro were skilled in mixing gold with other metals, giving it a natural appearance that often deceived even skilled silversmiths.

Among the most prominent sites for gold mining in early Philippine history were Aringay-Tonglo-Balatok gold trail covering the Cordillera Mountain Range and the Lingayen gulf towns of Agoo and Aringay; the mines of Paracale on the Bicol Peninsula which were a major source of gold for the trading centers of the Visayan islands, particularly Panay and Cebu; and the Butuan-Surigao area, particularly along the Agusan river on the island of Mindanao, which made the Butuan polity an important trading center.

Indigenous Filipinos were also known for the jewelry made of other precious stones such as carnelian, agate and pearl. Some notable examples of Filipino jewelry include necklaces, bangles, belts, armlets and rings placed around the waist.

== Pottery ==
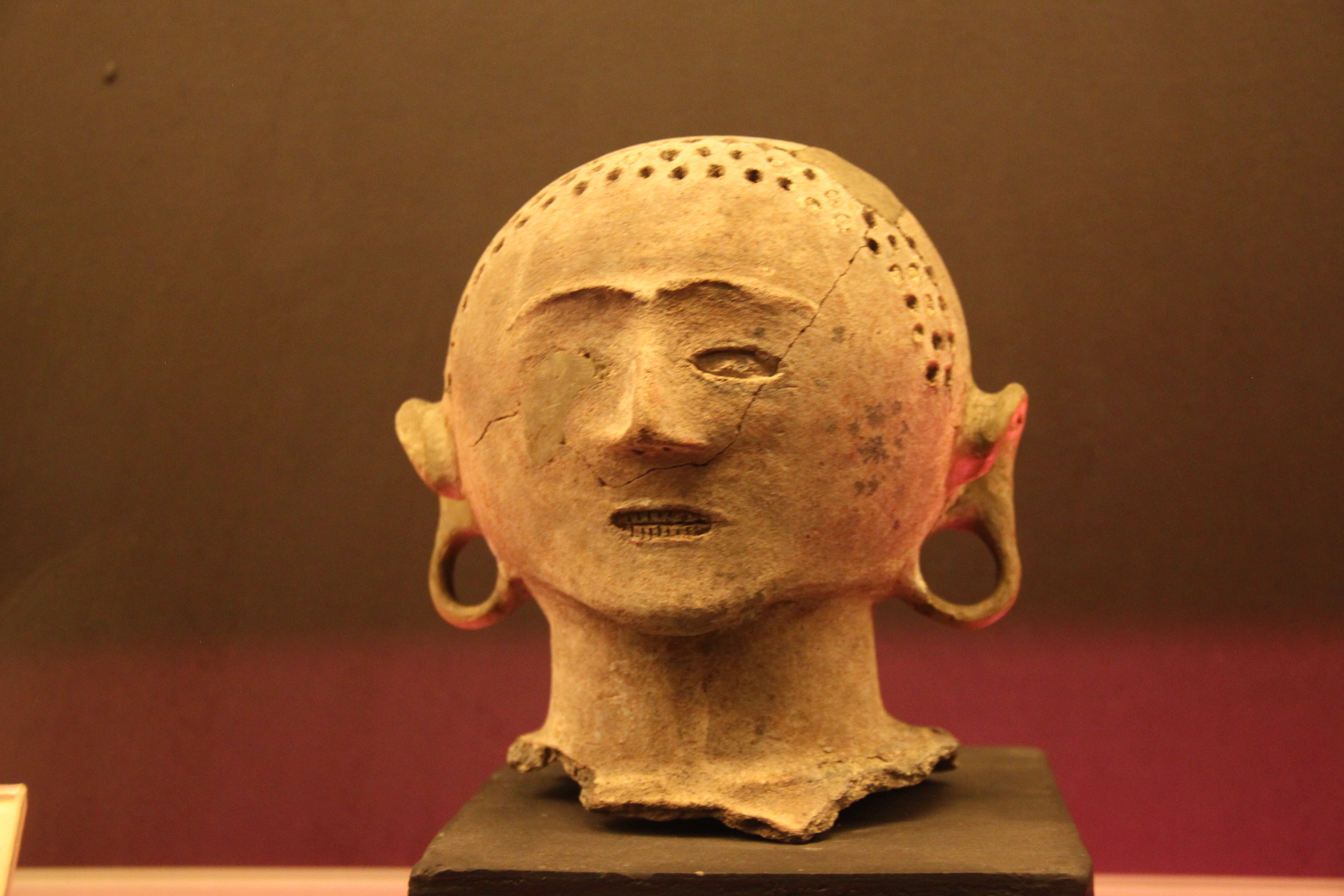
Detail of jar cover of one of the Maitum anthropomorphic pottery (5BC-370AD) from west Sarangani.

The ancient people of the Philippines had a rich tradition of pottery as verified by the finds at Ayub Cave in South Cotabato and other parts of the islands. Japanese texts mentioned trading expeditions to the island of Rusun (Luzon) for the highly prized Rusun and Namban jars of the area. Japanese texts were very specific about these jars being made in Luzon. The Tokiko, for example, referred to the Rusun and Namban jars as Ru-sun tsukuru or Lu-sung ch'i (in Chinese), which mean simply "made in Luzon." These Rusun jars, which had rokuru (wheel mark), were said to be more precious than gold because of their ability to act as tea canisters and enhance the fermentation process.

Pottery in the Philippines have different usage, depending on its cultural inclinations. Some potteries are used for food and beverages, while others are used for burials and religious ceremonies.

== Textiles and accessories ==
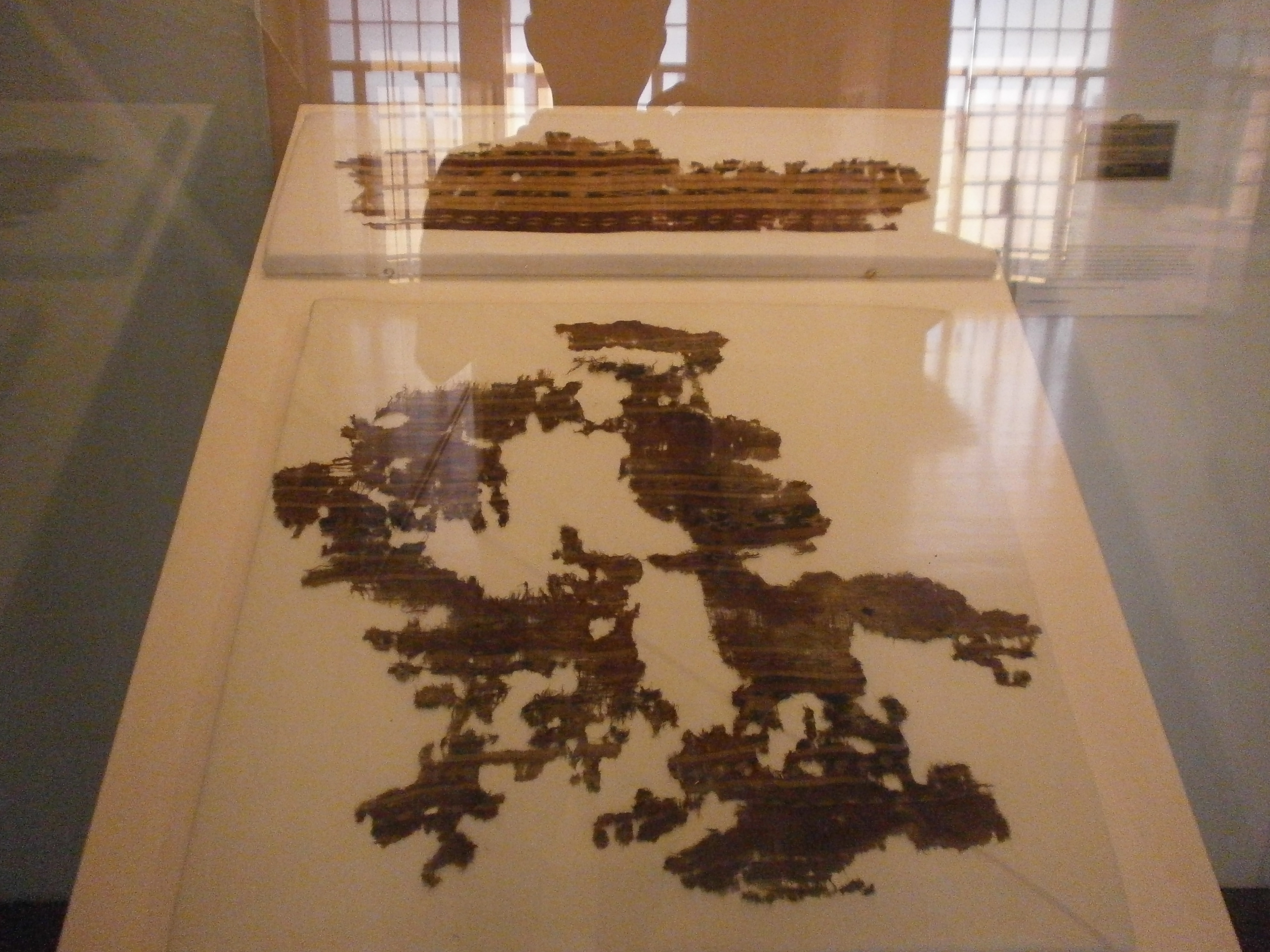
The Banton Cloth, the oldest existing example of warp ikat in Southeast Asia, displayed at the National Museum of the Philippines.

Indigenous textiles and accessories are extremely varied in the Philippines. The traditions concerning textiles and accessories have centuries of practices honed by different ethnic societies.

Shells, gold, beads, jade, silver, brass, copper, horns, bills, and many other materials have used in multiple accessories throughout the archipelago. Both gold and jade were one of the most prized, although ceremonial accessories were also very important.

The oldest surviving textile in the entire Southeast Asian region was found in the Philippine island of Banton in Romblon province. The cloth, known as the Banton cloth, has designs with folkloric motifs, and was used as a death wrap.

Examples of various textile types in the Philippines are the brocaded weave (pinilian) of the Ilocano, the wavy designs of the Bontoc, the geometric designs of the Kalinga, the piña of the Aklanon, the hablon of the Kiniray-a and Hiligaynon, the seputangan of the Yakan, the mabal tabih of the Blaan, the bagobo inabal of the Bagobo Manobo, the dagmay of the Mandaya, the mëranaw of the Maranao, the pis syabit of the Tausug, and the t'nala of the T'boli.

== Societal norms ==
In pre-colonial Philippines, both men and women enjoyed the same rights and privileges. Women, like men, can ascend the headship of families, villages, and cities. Women can also ascend the throne of a nation. In some cases, some queens have ascended as sole ruler, superior to her consort.

Additionally, children and elders were given the same respect, as children were also noted as capable of things that an elder can do if given the proper training. Unwed mothers or fathers were not shamed, as many of their gods and goddesses were the same. Divorce was also practiced, and was highly accepted. Both women and men can initiate a divorce.

The major aim of a Tagalog marriage was to provide the wife with a groom rather than a groom with a wife. In other words, Tagalog society was organized for women, men being necessary accessories. Virginity was considered by pre-colonial Filipinos as an impediment to marriage. The blood shed during the deflowering of a young woman was considered to be an impurity, so when a girl reaches her nubile years, a specialist in charge of deflowering was hired. According to Potet (2017) the man in charge of the operation may have also worn protective amulets to protect his penis from blood impurity. The term panatin was used to refer to the pre-colonial ceremonies marking the nubility of the woman and was also used as a term to refer to the deflowering process itself.

The practice of abortion and infanticide was widespread in pre-colonial Visayas, as it was considered a disgrace to raise a large family, presumably because having many children usually result to poverty. Abortions were carried out for unmarried women in pre-colonial Visayan society. In pre-colonial Tagalog society, infanticide was also routinely practiced for children born to unmarried women, however it does not appear to have been as widespread as in the Visayas. Infanticide through burying the child alive was also a practice in Pangasinan during the pre-colonial and early Spanish colonial period and it was carried out when a family didn't want or couldn't support the child. Unlike Visayans, the ancient Tagalogs prefer to raise large families, as evidenced by the numerous superstitions that encouraged fertility and the survival of infants.

After marriage, women did not lose their name. In fact, if a woman was especially distinguished, either from her own merit or her family's merit, her husband usually took her name as she was seen as far superior to her husband. During this time, women and feminized men were also given high distinction as many of which took on the role of shamans (such as Philippine shamans), who also took on the role as interim head of the domain every time a datu, a male or female ruler, is absent or goes into a journey.
