= Gold in early Philippine history =

Archeological record

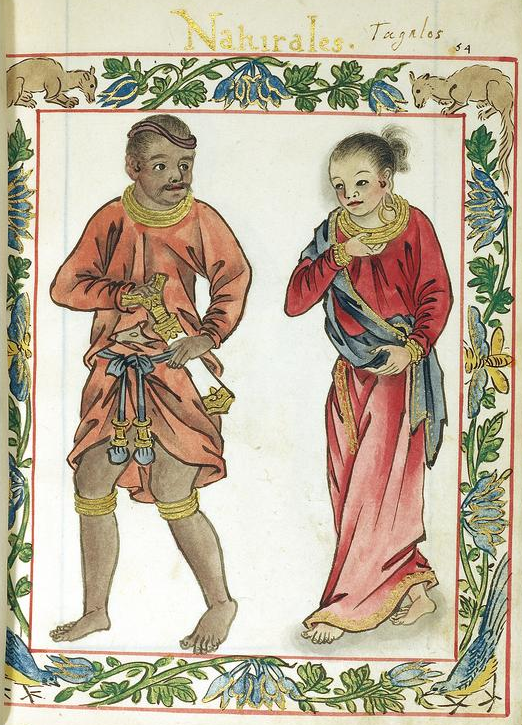
An illustration from the Boxer codex depicting a male and female Tagalog wearing gold ornamentation.

The extensive use of gold during early Philippine history is well-documented, both in the archeological record and in the various written accounts from precolonial and early Spanish colonial times. Gold was used throughout the Philippine archipelago in various decorative and ceremonial items, as clothing, and also as currency.

Gold was readily available throughout the Philippine archipelago, and gold items were valued as symbols of power and markers of elite status, although studies of grave artifacts suggest that these items were not as valued in precolonial Philippines as traded ornaments were. Gold was plentiful enough that local elites did not feel the need to acquire large amounts of it, and only sought it as the need arose, by trading with settlements which produced it through low intensity mining.

Among the most prominent sites for gold mining in early Philippine history were Aringay-Tonglo-Balatok trade route covering the Cordillera Mountain Range and the Lingayen gulf towns of Agoo and Aringay; the mines of Paracale on the Bicol Peninsula which were a major source of gold for the trading centers of the Visayan islands, particularly Panay and Cebu; and the Butuan-Surigao area, particularly along the Agusan river on the island of Mindanao, which made Butuan (historical polity) an important trading center.

== Sources and documentation ==
Scholarly information about the use of gold in early Philippine history comes mostly from artifacts that have been discovered in various sites in the Philippines, and from historical accounts from the early Spanish colonial period. Archeological excavation sites include ones in Batangas, Mindoro, Luzon, Samar, Butuan and Surigao.

== Prominent gold mining sites ==
Gold mined from the Cordillera Mountain Range were brought down to the coast through the Aringay-Tonglo-Balatok gold trail, making commercial trade centers out of Aringay and the neighboring settlement of Agoo, whose coast at the time was shaped in such a way that it was a good harbor for foreign vessels coming into Lingayen Gulf. On the island of Mindanao, gold was mined along the Agusan River in the Butuan-Surigao area and extensively worked in the Butuan polity located at the mouth of the Agusan River.

== Significant discoveries ==
Many discoveries of precolonial gold artifacts go unreported because the gold is found or stolen by treasure hunters, who simply melt the gold down for profit. Among the most important gold artifact discoveries are the "Surigao Treasure" found by construction worker Berto Morales in 1991, the Agusan image found by Manobo woman Belay Campos in 1917, the Bolinao Skull discovered by the National Museum of the Philippines at the Balingasay Archaeological Site in Bolinao, Pangasinan, and the Oton Death Mask excavated rom San Antonio, Iloilo on Panay Island by a team from the National Museum of the Philippines and the University of the Philippines Diliman in the 1960s.

== Uses of gold ==
=== Jewelry and clothing ===
Upon first arriving in the Philippine archipelago, landing specifically in the visayas, Spanish colonizers noted astonishing amounts of gold in common use, including earrings, armbands legbands, gold chains, collars of beads, wristlets, armlets, finger rings, and so on. They were also integrated into clothing as sequins, as clasps or buttons for cloaks or as broaches.

=== Decorative dentistry ===
Goldwork used as decorative dentistry was referred to in the Visayas as "pusad," and was noted by some of the earliest colonial era chroniclers, including Antonio Pigafetta and Fray Andres de Urdaneta. The practice is also commonly referenced in Mindanaoan epic poetry such as the Ulahingan of the Manobo people. Pegs called Bansil were inserted into holes drilled into the tooth, with the visible tip being either simple dot-shape, designed as a collection of overlapping scales, or intricate designs reminiscent of filigree. They were made more visible in light of the practice of staining teeth either black or bright red.

=== Religious items ===
Numerous gold artifacts recovered in the Philippines are believed to have ceremonial purposes. Some of these figures indicate the Hindu and Buddhist influence which came to the Philippines through regional trade in maritime southeast asia, while others reflect nature-based religious beliefs.

A notable artifact reflecting indigenous beliefs depicts what has been described as "the large, triangular face of a woman drawn in sharp lines with little shoulders and arms raised in a gesture of worship."

Visayan indigenous healing beliefs are likewise reflected in a particular variant of kamagi necklaces known as "tunga," which were snake-like in shape and made of “half gold and half tumbaga” gears strung together. These were believed to protect the wearer from the "folk illness" known as pasma.

Other notable ceremonial artifacts include: the Agusan Image which depicts a female Hindu or Buddhist deity whose identity is disputed, and the gold kinnari, which shows a mythical half-human half-bird figure common in hindu and buddhist parts of Maritime Southeast Asia.

=== Death masks and burial goods ===
Aside from decorative dentistry which they wore in life and carried the grave with them, ranking datus were often buried with items of gold, either in the form of gold burial goods, or as specifically designed funerary art such as death masks.

Burial goods found in graves from early Philippine history includes various beads earrings rings pendants, combs, strips, and other ornaments.

Another gold feature commonly discovered in elite burials from early historic Philippines are death mask artifacts, meant to cover either part or all of the deceased's face in the grave

When this practice was discovered by the Spanish colonizers, they created a rule that a government representative should always be present whenever the Spanish settlers dug up a grave - so that the Spanish government could get its designated 1/5 of the dug up goods.

Burial goods are among the most common surviving gold artifacts in the Philippines because gold which was not buried was typically eventually reforged into other forms as the colonial period proceeded.

=== Other uses ===
Accounts of early Spanish colonizers also noted the use of gold as spear decorations in the visayas.

=== As currency ===
Aside from use as decorative or utilitarian objects, gold was used throughout the Philippine archipelago as currency, whether in the form of gold dust, small beads, or barter rings.

==== Piloncitos ====
Modern day antique collectors have since coined the term "Piloncitos" to describe the small "bead-like" pieces of gold which were used as currency in Precolonial Philippines, comparing the cone-shaped pieces to a pilon of sugar. Early historical descriptions of the term include the Spanish "granitas de oro" (small grains of gold), or simply by whatever local language terms were used to mean "gold" in those times, such as "bulawan."

== See also ==
- History of the Philippines (900–1565)
- Barter rings
- Piloncitos
