= Maitum =

Municipality in Sarangani, Philippines

Maitum Maitom
- Municipality
- Municipality of Maitum

Other transcription(s)
  - Jawi: مايتم
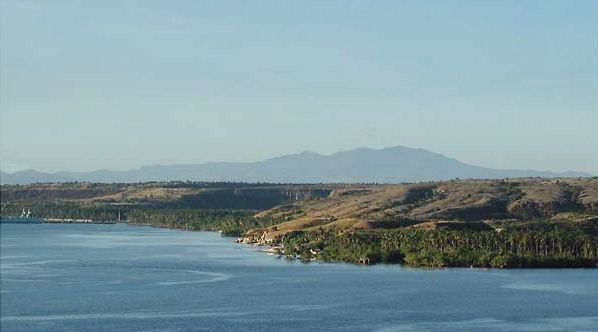
- Coastal view of Maitum

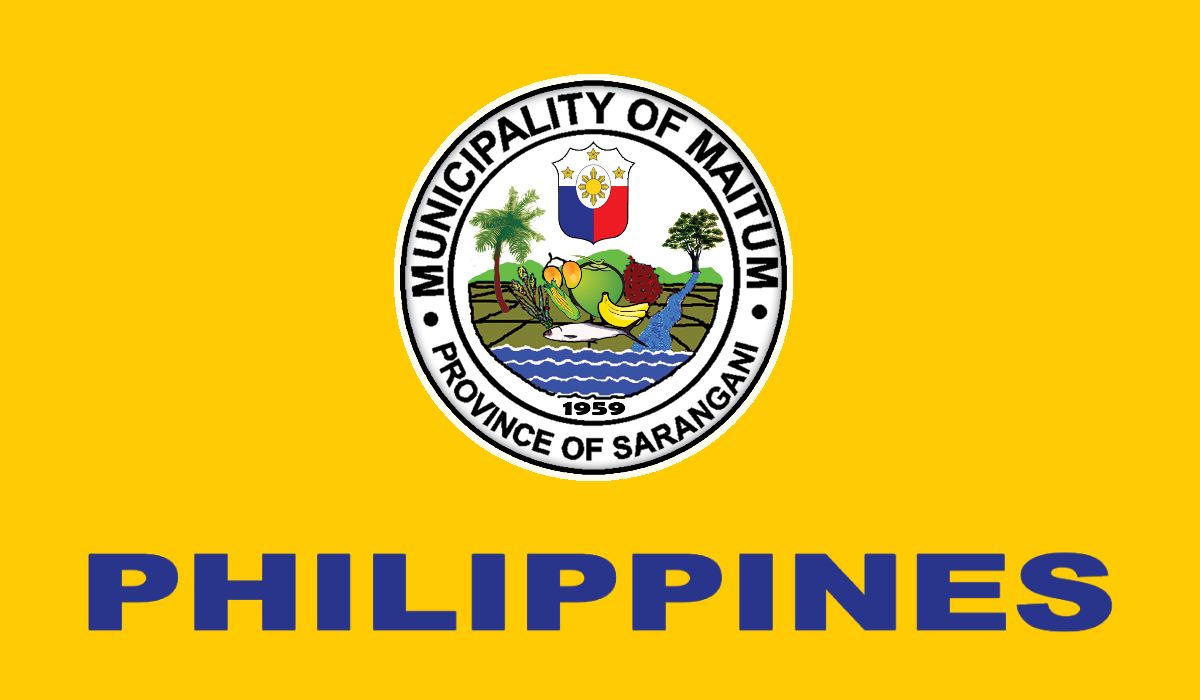
- Flag Seal
- Etymology: Black stone
- Motto: Masaganang Maitum
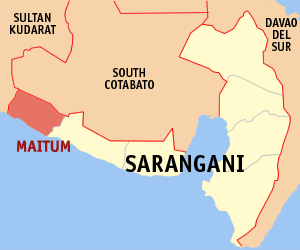
- Map of Sarangani with Maitum highlighted
- Interactive map of Maitum
- Location within the Philippines
- Coordinates: 6°02′N 124°29′E
- Country: Philippines
- Region: Soccsksargen
- Province: Sarangani
- District: Lone district
- Founded: May 7, 1959
- Barangays: 19 (see Barangays)

Government
  - Type: Local Government Unit
  - Mayor: Alexander Bryan B. Reganit
  - Vice Mayor: Tito T. Balazon
  - Representative: Steve Solon
  - Municipal Council: Members: Freddie F. Balazon; James Mark B. Reganit; James R. Ablog Sr.; Thong M. Sapal; Gilbert Z. Rocapor; Remigius D. Mayled; Fredimen K. Wanan; Zusima M. del Rosario
  - Electorate: 29,827 voters (2025)

Area
  - Total: 290.66 km^{2} (112.22 sq mi)
- Elevation: 62 m (203 ft)
- Highest elevation: 565 m (1,854 ft)
- Lowest elevation: 0 m (0 ft)

Population (2024 census)
  - Total: 46,120
  - Density: 158.7/km^{2} (411.0/sq mi)
  - Households: 10,805

Economy
  - Income class: 1st municipal income class
  - Poverty incidence: 20.93% (2023)
  - Revenue: ₱ 261.9 million (2024)
  - Assets: ₱ 708.1 million (2024)
  - Expenditure: ₱ 254.1 million (2024)
  - Liabilities: ₱ 139.4 million (2024)

Service provider
  - Electricity: South Cotabato 2 Electric Cooperative (SOCOTECO 2)
- Time zone: UTC+8 (PST)
- ZIP code: 9515
- PSGC: 1208005000
- IDD : area code: +63 (0)83
- Native languages: Cebuano; Tboli; Maguindanao; Blaan; Tagalog
- Website: www.maitum.gov.ph

Maitum, officially the Municipality of Maitum (Note: Blaan: Banwé Maitum Sinugboanon: Lungsod sa Maitum Mëgindënëwn: Inged nu Maitum Tboli: Benwu Maitum Tagakolu: Lunsud na Ma-itum Hiligaynon: Banwa sang Maitum Ilokano: Ili ti Maitum Filipino: Munisipalidad ng Maitum), is a municipality in the province of Sarangani, Philippines. According to the 2024 census, it has a population of 46,120 people, making it the least populated municipality in the province.

It is bordered on the west by the province of Sultan Kudarat, on the east by the municipality of Kiamba, on the north by the province of South Cotabato, and the south by the Celebes Sea.

== Etymology ==
According to local folklore, "Maitum" refers to the black stones in the Saub River. It is believed that the river stones turned black when the local native princess and her warrior lover passed through it as they eloped and escaped from the wrath of the princess's father who disapproved of their marriage. The town's name is derived from the Visayan word maitom, literally meaning black.

== History ==
Maitum was established as a separate municipality of the then-undivided Cotabato through Republic Act No. 2189, enacted without executive approval on May 7, 1959, constituting 21 barrios of Kiamba; and designating the seat of government at Barrio Maitum. Maitum and Kiamba, along other municipalities of Cotabato, became part of South Cotabato upon its establishment in 1966. Furthermore, the two were among the seven municipalities which ultimately became part of Sarangani in 1992.

== Geography ==
=== Barangays ===
Maitum is politically subdivided into 19 barangays. Each barangay consists of puroks while some have sitios.

- Batian
- Kalaneg
- Kalaong
- Kiambing
- Kiayap
- Mabay
- Maguling
- Malalag
- Mindupok
- New La Union
- Old Poblacion
- Pangi
- Pinol
- Sison
- Ticulab
- Tuanadatu
- Upo
- Wali
- Zion

=== Climate ===
Climate data for Maitum, Sarangani
Month	Jan	Feb	Mar	Apr	May	Jun	Jul	Aug	Sep	Oct	Nov	Dec	Year
Mean daily maximum °C (°F)	30 (86)	30 (86)	31 (88)	31 (88)	30 (86)	29 (84)	29 (84)	29 (84)	30 (86)	30 (86)	29 (84)	30 (86)	30 (86)
Mean daily minimum °C (°F)	23 (73)	23 (73)	24 (75)	24 (75)	25 (77)	24 (75)	24 (75)	24 (75)	24 (75)	24 (75)	24 (75)	24 (75)	24 (75)
Average precipitation mm (inches)	193 (7.6)	177 (7.0)	222 (8.7)	222 (8.7)	278 (10.9)	292 (11.5)	245 (9.6)	222 (8.7)	174 (6.9)	193 (7.6)	245 (9.6)	233 (9.2)	2,696 (106)
Average rainy days	24.6	22.1	25.7	26.3	28.4	27.2	25.9	25.2	22.3	25.9	27.3	26.9	307.8
Source: Meteoblue

== Demographics ==
Population census of Maitum
Year	Pop.	±% p.a.
1960	9,484	—
1970	17,511	+6.32%
1975	17,278	−0.27%
1980	24,846	+7.53%
1990	25,640	+0.32%
1995	35,009	+6.01%
2000	35,536	+0.32%
2007	37,054	+0.58%
2010	41,675	+4.37%
2015	44,595	+1.30%
2020	44,185	−0.19%
2024	46,120	+1.03%
Source: Philippine Statistics Authority

The majority of the population are of Ilocano origin. One of the indigenous peoples living in mountainous areas of Maitum is known as T'boli. The annual Binuyugan Festival is celebrated in May. The main language of the municipality is Cebuano, but other languages also heard there include Ilocano, Hiligaynon and Maguindanaon. T'boli is also spoken by its eponymous ethnic group living in the hinterlands.

Internationally, Maitum is known for the discovery of very old cave artifacts called Maitum Anthropomorphic Potteries in one of the caves nearby. Ancient burial jars were discovered by archaeologists from the National Museum in Ayub Cave, Maitum, in 1991 and in 2008, at Sagel Cave, Maitum (now declared by National Historical Institute as a national historical sites). Amid Mindanao's armed conflicts, artifacts found thereat prove settlements of pre-historic civilization in Maitum.

== Economy ==
Poverty incidence of Maitum (%)

Source: Philippine Statistics Authority

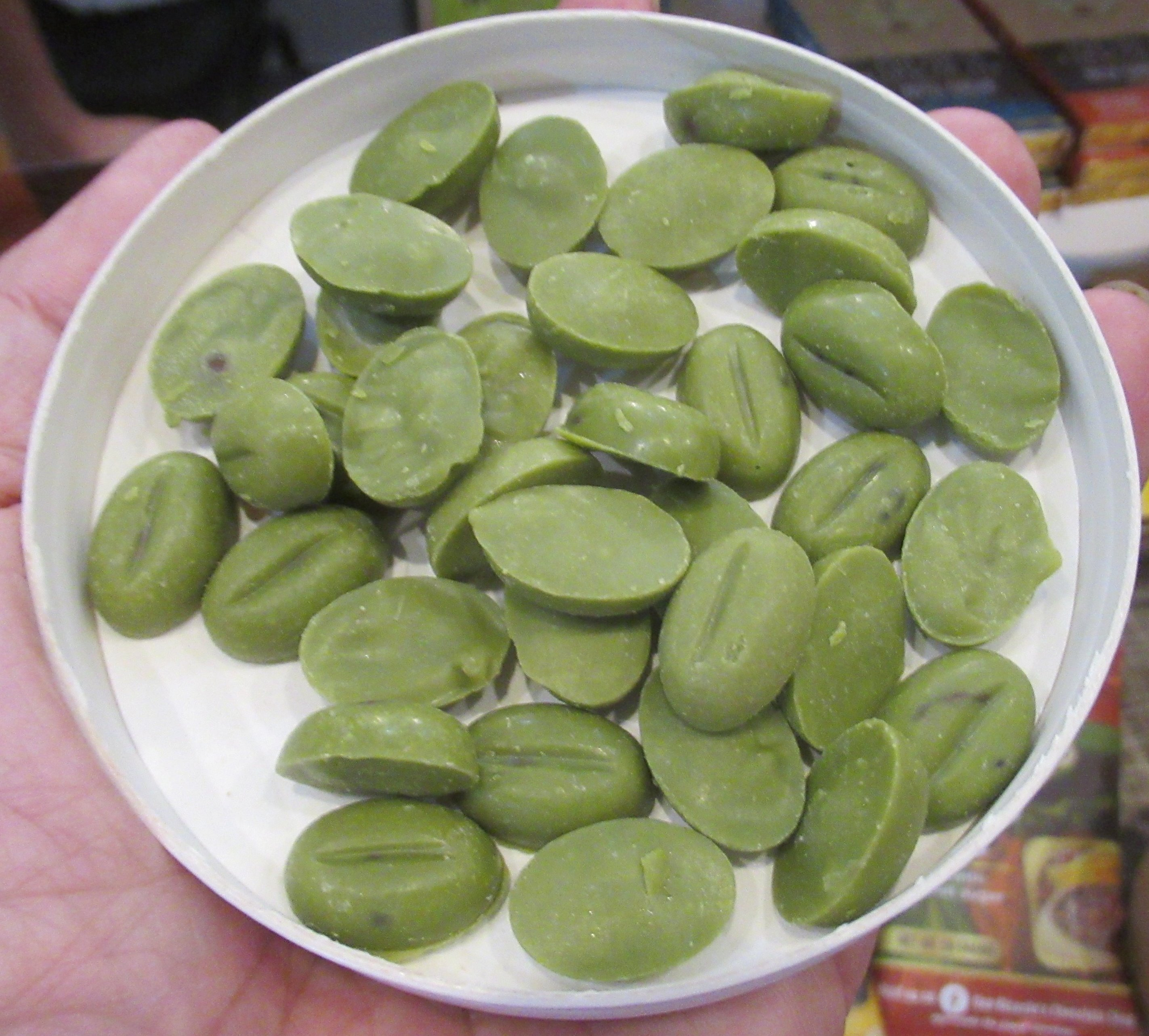
Coffee bean chocolate matcha (Don Ricardo’s Chocolate, Maitum)

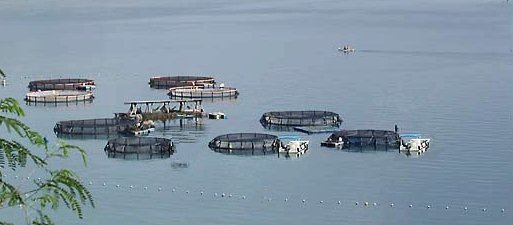
Maitum aqua-culture fish cages

The economy of Maitum is largely based on agriculture and is often called the "rice-granary" of Sarangani due to its high level production of rice. Aqua-culture is the second biggest income earner, notably the culture of milkfish (bangus), prawns (particularly giant prawns) and shrimps for export. Other agricultural products are coconuts, maize, rubber, bananas, mangoes, pork, eggs, beef, fish and cacao. Maitum is also a food basket nationally famous for its marinated flying fish.

The economy has accelerated in the past decade driven by advances in global communication technology and the finishing of a modern highway that tremendously improved trade and transport.

== Wildlife ==
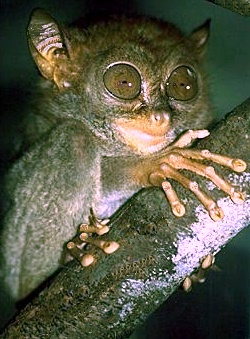
Tarsier

Tarsiers have been discovered in Maitum's mountainous areas.

Caves and the rainforest of Maitum are the natural habitat of a rare fruit bat species called giant golden-crowned flying fox (Acedoron jubatus), also known as "silent planter," since it contributes greatly to forest regeneration, because of eating many fruits and their seeds. The rare writhed-billed hornbill and Mindanao hornbill are also found in the surrounding rainforest. The Philippine eagle (a monkey-eating eagle) also thrives in the area.

Endangered hawksbill turtles have their nesting grounds in Maitum's former main village called "Old Poblacion".

Other wild animals are wild boar, deer, monkeys, and various species of snake.

Sea turtles or pawikan can also be found in Maitum, Sarangani specifically at the Pawikan Nesting Sanctuary founded in 2003.

== Cultural Heritage ==
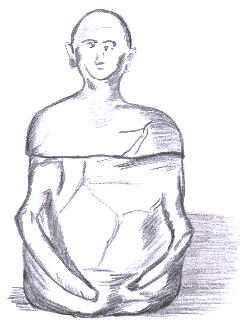
Sketch of an anthropomorphic jar

The town is the location where the Maitum Anthropomorphic Pottery or Maitum Jars were found.

In 1991, the National Museum archaeological team discovered anthropomorphic secondary burial jars in Ayub Cave, Barangay Pinol, Maitum, Sarangani, Mindanao, Philippines. The jars are commonly known today as Maitum jars. They are made of earthenware, and are characterized by their design that suggests human figures with complete or partial facial features of the first inhabitants in Mindanao. Furthermore, they give emphasis to the Filipinos’ popular belief of life after death.

According to Dr. Eusebio Dizon, head of the archaeological team, this type of burial jars are “remarkably unique and intriguing” because they have not been found elsewhere in Southeast Asia. Thus, many archaeologists from Vietnam, Thailand, Malaysia, Laos, Cambodia, Burma and Indonesia gained interest on this initial find and a number of archaeological - either government or privately sponsored - excavations have been conducted to recover these artifacts.

These jars have characteristics that belong to the Developed Metal Age Period in the Philippines [calibrated date of 190 BC to 500 AD]. According to the laboratory results determined through radiocarbon dating, these secondary burial jars date back to the Metal Age. Two conventional dates were 1830 +/-60 B.P. [calibrated date of AD 70 to 370] and 1920 +/- 50 B.P. [calibrated date of 5 BC to 225 AD]. Experts used soot samples taken from the walls of a small earthenware vessel found inside one of the larger burial jars.

Most of the jars are now on display at the National Museum of the Philippines in Manila. The town has a museum with Maitum jars, however, the jars are only replicas. According to the town government, they intend for the Maitum jars to be returned to Maitum town from Manila once a proper museum with high-tech conservation capabilities has been established. Unfortunately, funding for the museum from the national government is scarce. Museum researchers have speculated that many Maitum jars have been looted before their initial discovery, as many jars have been seen in the black market.

The Maitum Jars have been declared as National Treasures of the Philippines and Important Cultural Properties of the Philippines, meaning, they must never get out from the country and should be conserved by all means. Found jars should be directly given to the government for proper conservation for future generations, and must not be sold to collectors. Violating the law that safeguards the Maitum jars will lead to imprisonment of up to 20 years and payment for damages up to 250,000 pesos. Unfortunately, despite the high regard of scholars on the Maitum jars, in an interview of townsfolk in 2012, majority of the residents of Maitum town are unaware of the cultural value of the jars. The interview noted the need for a public awareness campaign on the importance of the Maitum jars for the town's heritage, especially to the barangays within the caves they were found in.

Some locals have said that they have sold jars to foreigners, who pay them a hefty price. Locals would sometimes throw away jar shards as well. On top of that, the caves where the jars were initially found have repeatedly been ransacked since there are no physical protections in the site. There are no site guards or a conservation station located within the vicinity of the cave despite being discovered around 3 decades ago. Many jar shards exist in the caves and are left unprotected, despite the caves being declared as a heritage site. Due to these factors, despite many scholars wanting to campaign the declaration of the town as a UNESCO World Heritage Site, such declaration would be hard to achieve due to the lack of public awareness in the town itself, mindfulness for cultural heritage in the town, and physical and a better legal protection for the caves and its jars.
