= Prehistory of the Philippines =

History of the Philippines before 900

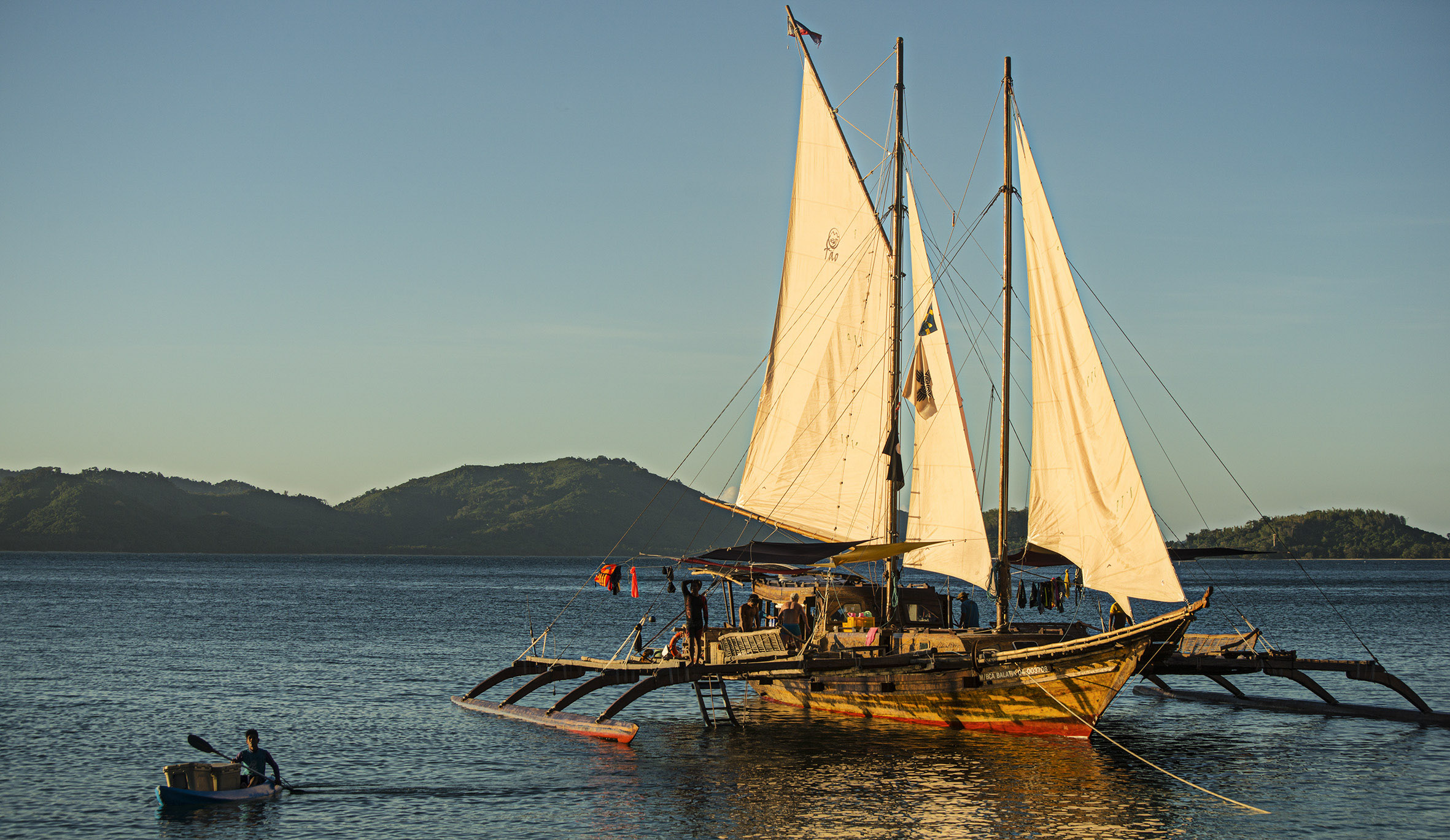
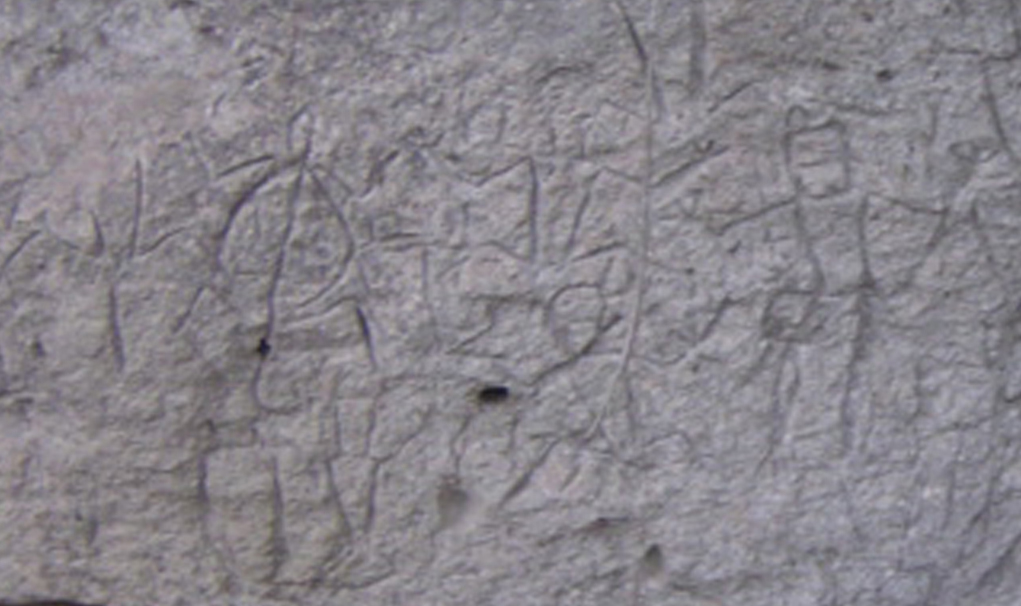
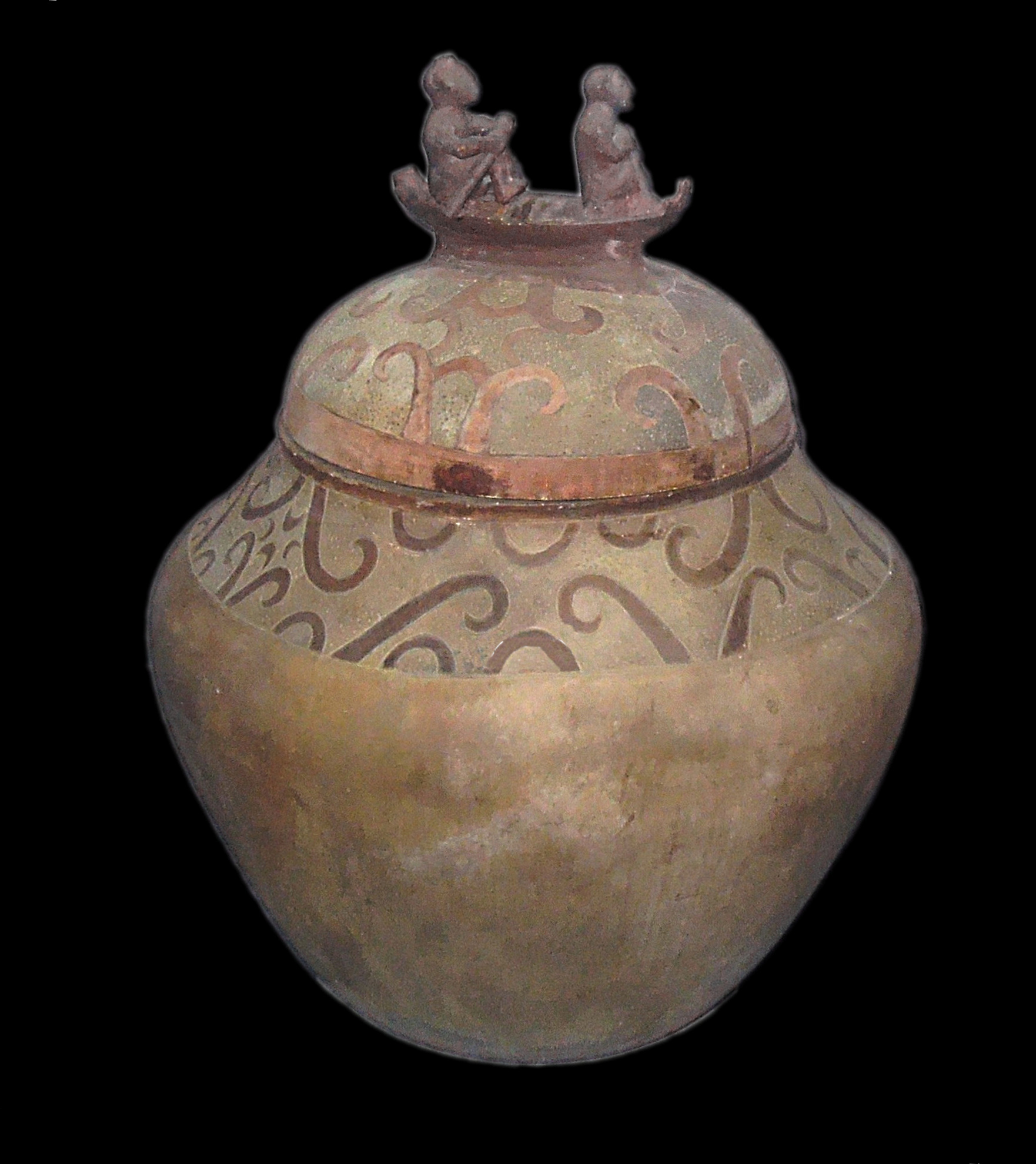
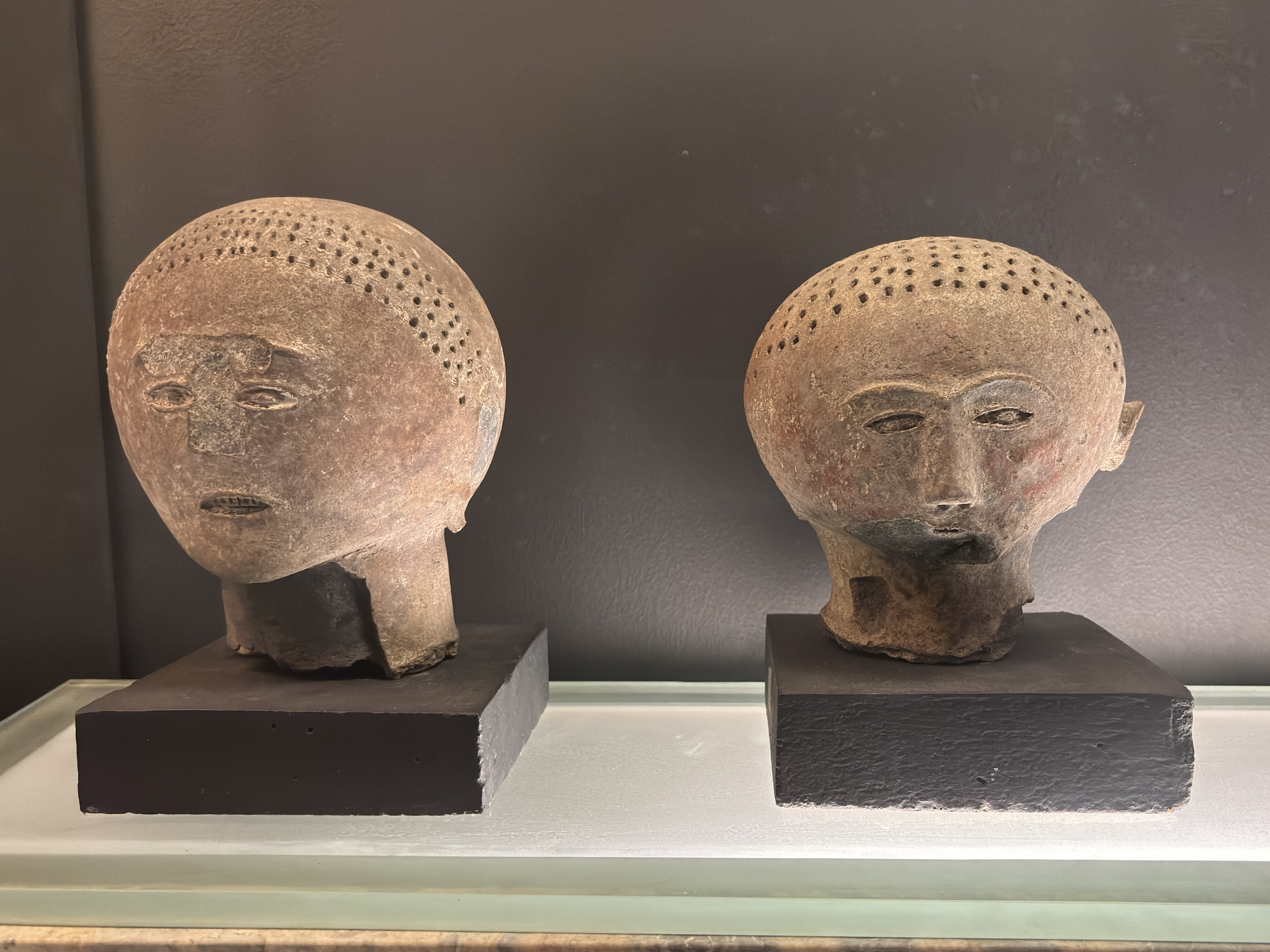
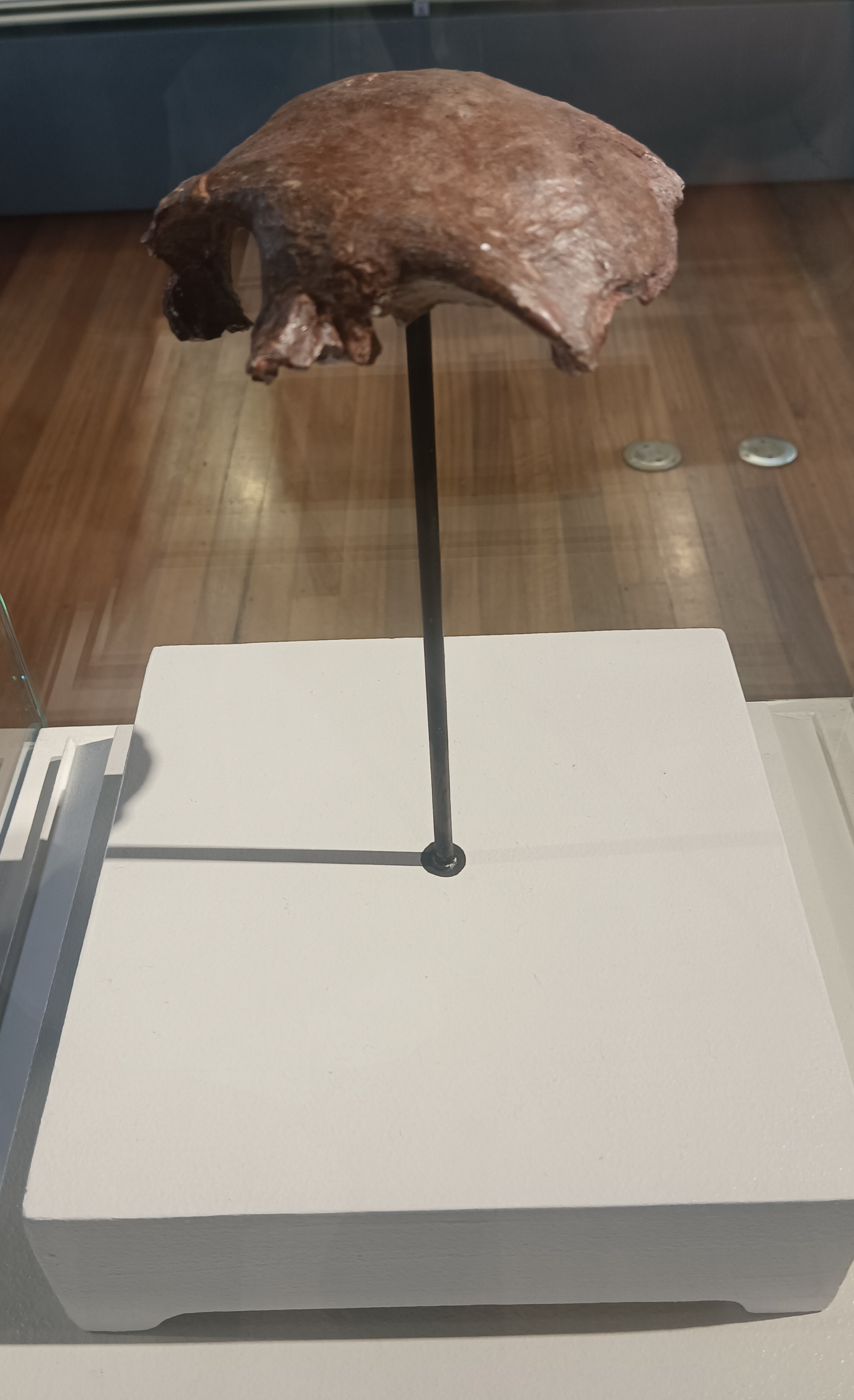
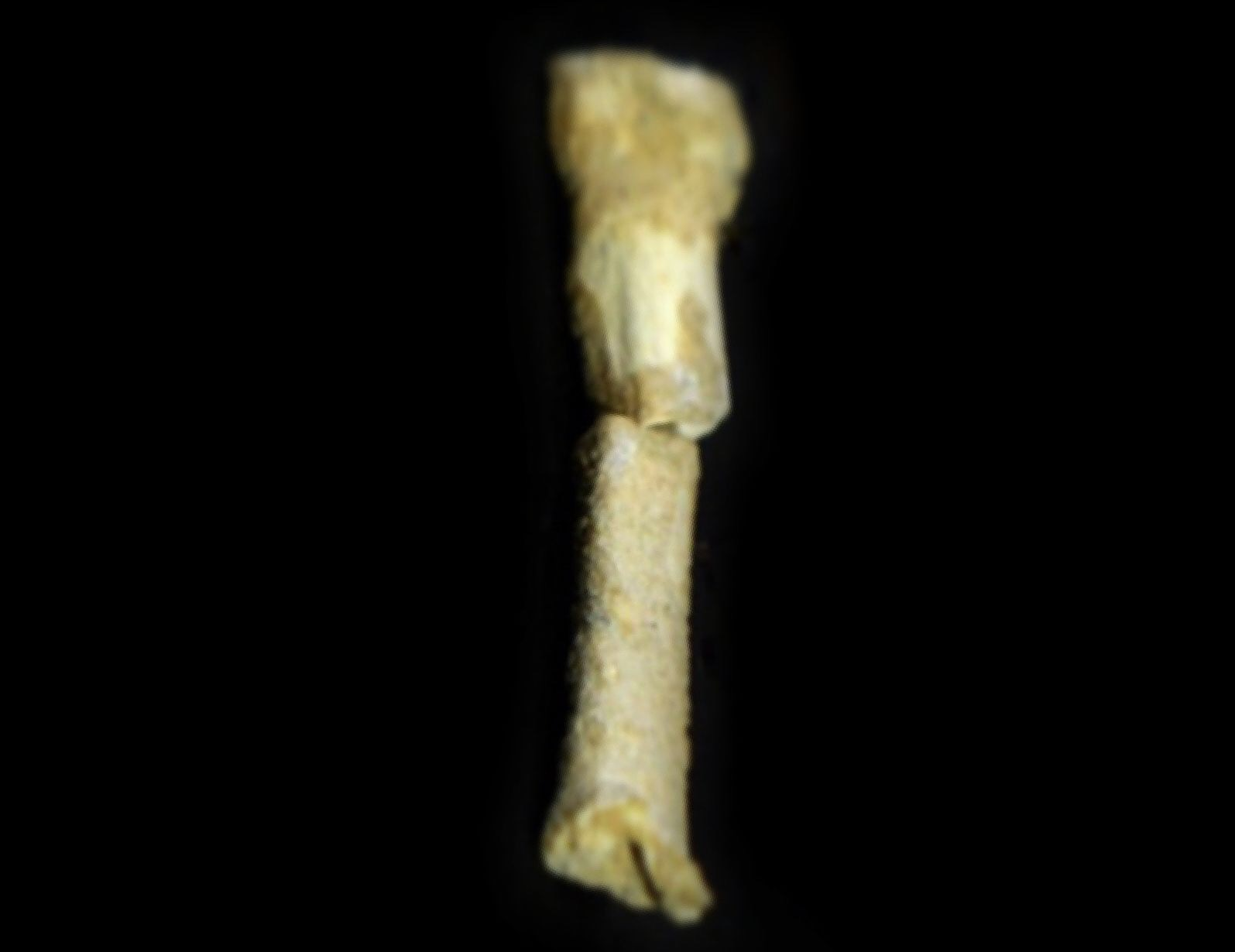
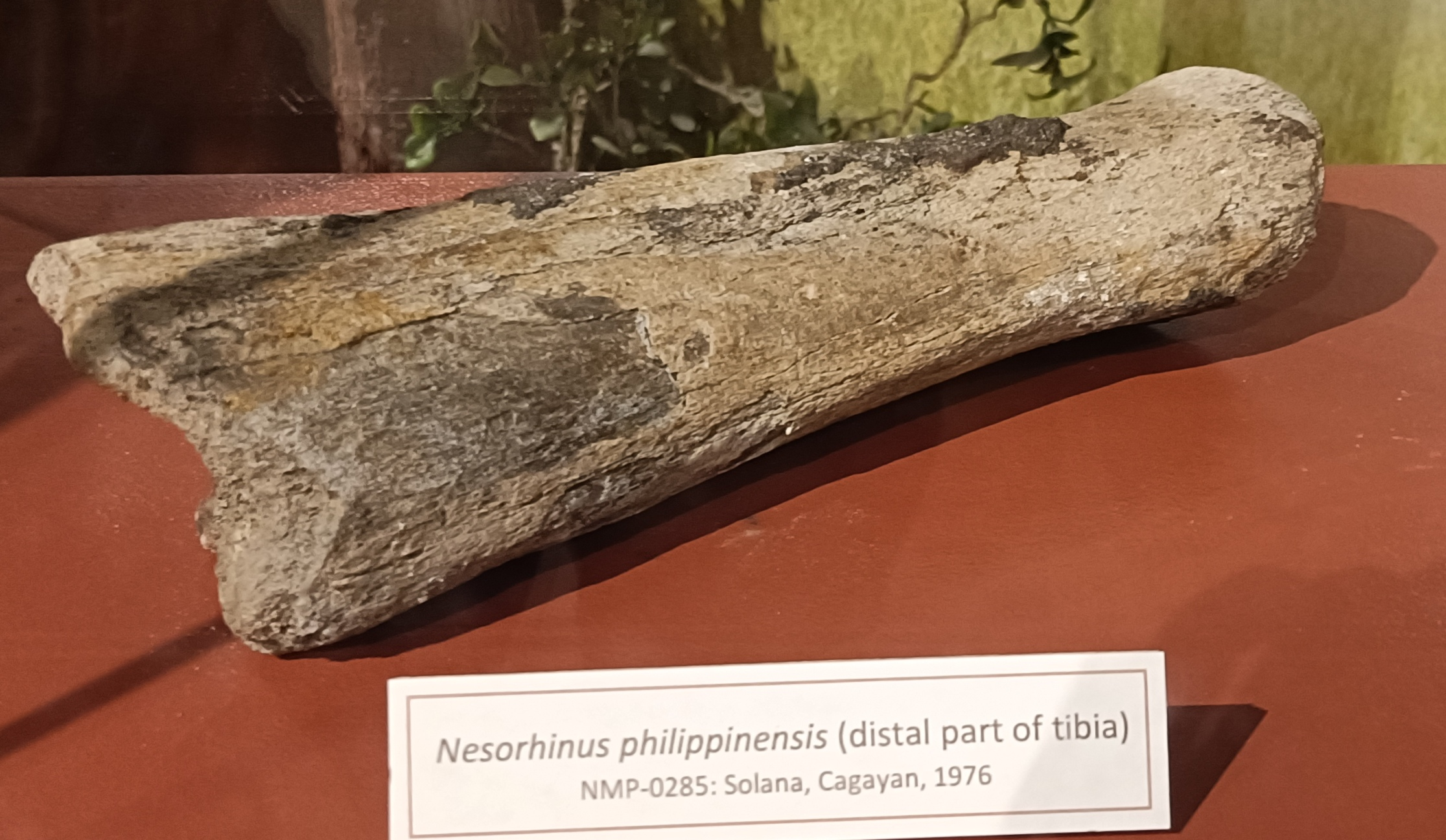
Clockwise from top: Recreation of a balangay, the Angono Petroglyphs, Maitum anthropomorphic jar lids, a metatarsal from Homo luzonensis, a leg bone from Nesorhinus philippinensis, Tabon Man skull cap, and the Manunggul Jar

Hominins first arrived in the Philippines during a period of lower global sea levels between 1 million years ago (1 mya) to 700,000 years ago (700 kya). Early migrations to its largest island Luzon happened in the Pleistocene and most likely began from the south in Borneo, an island once connected to mainland Asia. From there, hominins crossed narrow sea barriers and reached Luzon by passing through Palawan then Mindoro. The oldest known hominin fossils belong to the extinct Homo luzonensis, which inhabited present-day Cagayan Valley around 67 kya. The species was characterized by its short stature and relatively small brain.

The Philippines' early inhabitants were hunter-gatherers. Apart from wild pigs, deer, and bovines, they hunted a diverse range of large animals like rhinoceros, giant turtles, and elephants. The tools they manufactured were made of stone and were simple, irregularly shaped, convenient, and disposable. Dark-skinned, short-statured, and frizzy-haired peoples called Aytas or Negritos reached the archipelago by about 50–40 kya and were the first anatomically modern humans to do so.

The current demarcation between this period and the early history of the Philippines is April 21, 900, which is the equivalent on the Proleptic Gregorian calendar for the date indicated on the Laguna Copperplate Inscription—the earliest known surviving written record to come from the Philippines. This period saw the immense change that took hold of the archipelago from Stone Age cultures in 50000 BC to the emergence of coastal trading centers in the fourth century, continuing on with the gradual widening of trade until 900 and the first surviving written records.

== Background ==
The Philippines is an archipelago that lies in the Earth's tropics, giving it a warm climate and making it prone to severe rainfall. Physical, chemical, and biological processes in humid environments – such as thermal decomposition, weathering, erosion, and bioturbation – make organic matter and sediments hard to preserve and easy to destroy. Finding samples that would otherwise be useful in constructing a detailed archaeological record is therefore difficult. For example, there is currently a scarce amount of bones discovered in archaeological sites across the country.

== Pleistocene ==
=== Arrival of the first hominins ===
==== Means of traveling ====
Early hominin species first populated the Philippines by crossing the surrounding waters during the Last Glacial Period, when sea levels were lower and present-day islands were easier to reach due to land bridges and narrower straits. (Note: Palawan was likely connected to mainland Asia during the Last Glacial Maximum, which could have allowed hominin migration by foot. However, no land bridges connected Palawan to the rest of the Philippines. Sea crossings were the only way to reach them.) These migrations began in the Chibanian (Middle Pleistocene) age, between 1 million to 700 thousand years before present (YBP). It was possible for hominins to reach a new island purely by accident.

There is currently no material evidence that hominins built watercraft capable of navigating the Philippine seas. Regardless, they must have found a way to drift or raft across vast expanses of water, with floating vegetation as proposed objects for doing so. Archaeologist Thomas Ingicco suggested that mangroves uprooted by disasters like typhoons could serve as such natural rafts.

==== Migration routes ====
To reach the Philippines during the Pleistocene, hominins had to come from either the north in Taiwan or the south in Borneo. Borneo was the most likely starting point. It was fairly close to the Philippines and, due to low sea levels, was connected to mainland Asia through the Sundaland landmass. Hominins from Borneo would have reached Luzon by passing through Palawan first, followed by Mindoro; they may have also entered the Philippines via the Sulu Archipelago.

Sulawesi, an Indonesian island to the south, was also a likely starting point for hominin migration. Hominins coming from Sulawesi would have arrived at the Philippines via Mindanao. Although possible, the least likely migration scenario is a sea crossing from Taiwan to Luzon via the Luzon Strait. The ocean currents were highly turbulent and required advanced navigation technologies to overcome.

=== Early hominin activity ===
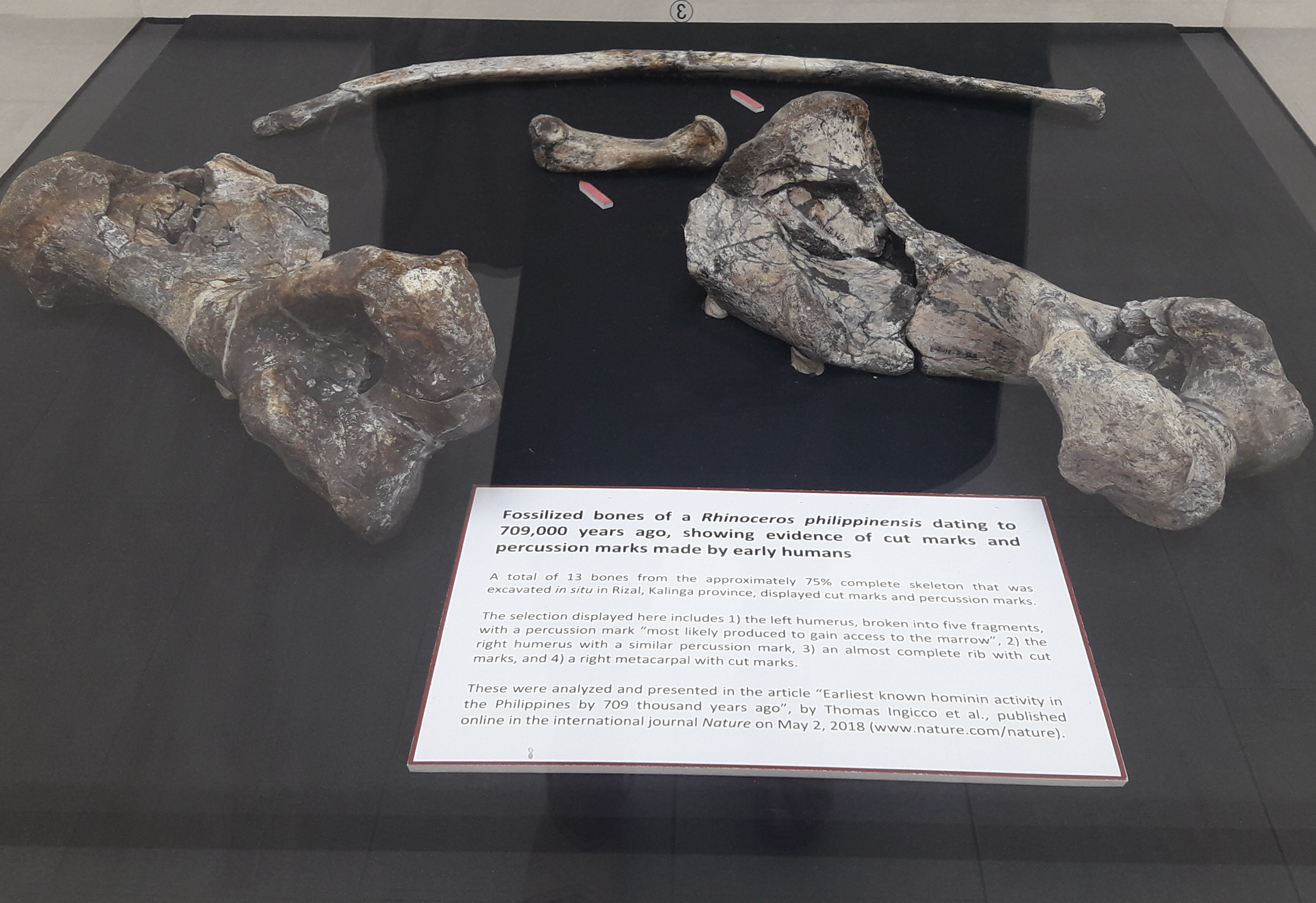
Nesorhinus remains dated to about 709,000 years before present, displayed at the National Museum of the Philippines

Hominin activity in the Philippines dates back to c. 709,000±68,000 YBP, during the Middle Pleistocene. The earliest known evidence comes in the form of 57 stone tools discovered in Rizal, Kalinga province, alongside the remains of a butchered ancient rhinoceros. Their ages were determined using radiometric and electron spin resonance dating methods. Cut marks on 13 bones showed that flesh was removed from the animal's carcass; percussion marks on the humeri suggested they were smashed apart for extracting marrow. The discovery hints at the presence of Homo erectus – or a species related to H. erectus – in the area. Other megafauna fossils found in Kalinga and the rest of Luzon showed that stegodonts, elephants, giant tortoises, and giant rats were also hunted for food.

In General Tinio, Nueva Ecija province, 18 modified stone tools were found on the foothills of the Sierra Madre. The excavation site, Arubo 1, yielded several bifacial tools, such as a cleaver and a hand axe with one almost-fully modified face. The tools had unusually formal shapes, and they showed signs of organized production, careful curation, and versatility. These were atypical for most prehistoric stone artifacts in the Philippines, which were crudely made, expedient, and easily disposable. The Arubo tools were larger than those from Rizal and probably of a similar age. They were likely of Middle Pleistocene, Lower Paleolithic origin, but exact dating is unfeasible since the area had been disturbed prior to discovery.

=== Homo luzonensis ===
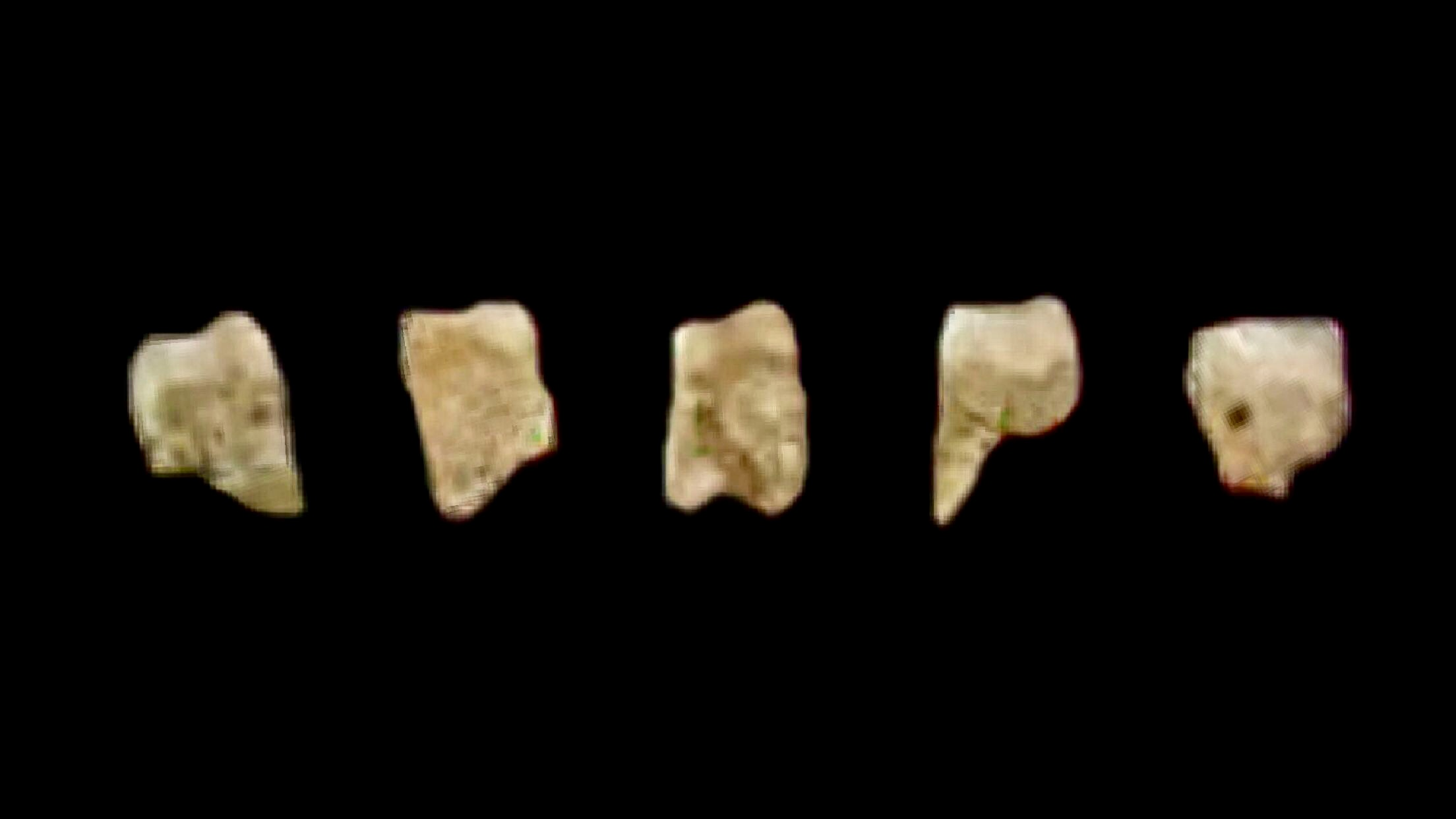
Five teeth assigned to Homo luzonensis.

The oldest known hominin fossils are attributed to the extinct Homo luzonensis. The species' evolutionary origins are unclear. It might have descended from Indonesian H. erectus groups that had dispersed across island Southeast Asia (ISEA) and speciated after a period of geographic isolation. H. luzonensis probably coexisted with multiple hominin species, including H. erectus, in the Philippines.

Traditionally, H. luzonensis remains have been dated to around 67 kya. More recent studies suggest they might be as old as 134±14 kya. The fossils were discovered in Callao Cave, located in the municipality of Peñablanca in Cagayan province. Included in the discovery were several unusually small teeth, suggesting that H. luzonensis was presumably diminutive and small-brained, although making accurate estimates about their height and size is hard due to a lack of fossils. The remains were found alongside several deer, pig, and bovine bones, some of which had cut marks that suggested animal butchery.

=== Presence of anatomically modern humans ===
Anatomically modern humans (Homo sapiens) are estimated to have colonized the Philippines and the rest of ISEA by c. 50–40 kya, in the Tarantian or Late Pleistocene. Their subsistence strategies are characterized by a hunter-gatherer lifestyle, high mobility, complex fishing and seafaring technologies, crude and expedient tools, and early ritual practices. The first modern humans to reach the archipelago are commonly referred to as Aytas or Negritos. They had dark skin, short stature, frizzy hair, and high levels of ancestry from Denisovans, archaic hominins that had interbred with H. sapiens upon their arrival in Southeast Asia.

Between c. 35–33 kya, modern humans had already reached Mindoro, arriving from the southwest through Palawan. The given date is based on AMS radiocarbon dating techniques performed on artifacts from three sites in southern Mindoro. H. sapiens inhabiting the islands did not have advanced stone technologies – their simple tools were presumably made from shells and beach pebbles. They had a wide variety of food options, like fish, molluscs, macaques, rats, porcupines, pangolins, wild pigs, tamaraws, deer, reptiles, and tigers. Pilanduk Cave in Palawan and Bilat Cave in Mindoro are currently the only sites that contain evidence for human activity during the Last Glacial Maximum (25–20 kya), when sea levels were at their lowest.

Fossilized fragments of a skull and jawbone of three individuals had been discovered on May 28, 1962 by Dr. Robert B. Fox, an American anthropologist of the National Museum. These fragments are collectively called "Tabon Man" after the place where they were found on the west coast of Palawan. Tabon Cave appears to be a kind of a Stone Age factory, with both finished stone flake tools and waste core flakes having been found at four separate levels in the main chamber. Charcoal left from three assemblages of cooking fires there has been Carbon-14 dated to roughly 7,000, 20,000, and 22,000 BC. These remains are the oldest modern human remains found on the islands, and have been U/Th-dated to 47,000 ± 11–10,000 years ago. (In Mindanao, the existence and importance of these prehistoric tools was noted by famed José Rizal himself, because of his acquaintance with Spanish and German scientific archaeologists in the 1880s, while in Europe.)

Tabon Cave is named after the "Tabon bird" (Tabon scrubfowl, Megapodius cumingii), which deposited thick hard layers of guano during the period when the cave was still uninhabited, resulting to a cement-like floor made of bird dung where three succeeding groups of tool-makers settled. It is indicated that about half of the 3,000 specimens recovered from the cave are discarded cores of a material which had to be transported from some distance. The Tabon man fossils are considered to have come from the third group of inhabitants who inhabited the cave between 22,000 and 20,000 BC. An earlier cave level lies so far below the level containing cooking fire assemblages that it must represent Upper Pleistocene dates from 45 or 50 thousand years ago.

Physical anthropologists who have examined the Tabon Man skullcap have agreed that it belonged to a modern man (Homo sapiens), as distinguished from the mid-Pleistocene Homo erectus species. This indicates that Tabon Man was Pre-Mongoloid (Mongoloid being the term anthropologists apply to the racial stock which entered Southeast Asia during the Holocene and absorbed earlier peoples to produce the modern Malay, Indonesian, Filipino, and "Pacific" peoples). Two experts have given the opinion that the mandible is "Australian" in physical type, and that the skullcap measurements are most nearly like the Ainus or Tasmanians. Nothing can be concluded about Tabon man's physical appearance from the recovered skull fragments except that he was not a Negrito.

The custom of Jar Burial, which ranges from Sri Lanka, to the Plain of Jars, in Laos, to Japan, also was practiced in the Tabon caves. A spectacular example of a secondary burial jar is owned by the National Museum, a National Treasure, with a jar lid topped with two figures, one the deceased, arms crossed, hands touching the shoulders, the other a steersman, both seated in a proa, with only the mast missing from the piece. Secondary burial was practiced across all the islands of the Philippines during this period, with the bones reburied, some in the burial jars. Seventy-eight earthenware vessels were recovered from the Manunggul cave, Palawan, specifically for burial.

Human remains in the cave are from both large and small individuals. The latter fit well with Philippine negritos who were among the archipelago's earliest inhabitants, descendants of the first human migrations out of Africa via the coastal route along southern Asia to the now sunken landmasses of Sundaland and Sahul.

== Holocene ==
The first evidence of the systematic use of Stone Age technology in the Philippines is estimated to 50,000 BC, and this phase in the development of proto-Philippine societies is considered to end with the rise of metal tools in about 500 BC, albeit with stone tools still used past that date. Filipino anthropologist F. Landa Jocano refers to the earliest noticeable stage in the development of proto-Philippine societies as the Formative Phase. He also identified stone tools and ceramic manufacture as the two core industries that defined the period's economic activity, and which shaped the means by which early Filipinos adapted to their environment during this period.

=== Balobok Archaeological Site ===
The site is one of the earliest human settlement zones in the region. The site itself is part of a huge karst system with layers of shells and other minerals made by early humans. More excavation led to discovery of ancient artifacts like flake tools, polished stones, earthenware shards, bone tools and some animal remains. These remains and artifacts were dated by C-14 to be around 8,810 to 5,190 years ago, making the site one of the most significant archaeological sites in the region. The site was declared an Important Cultural Property in 2017 by the National Government.

=== Neolithic Austronesian migrations ===
Migration of the Austronesian peoples and their languages.

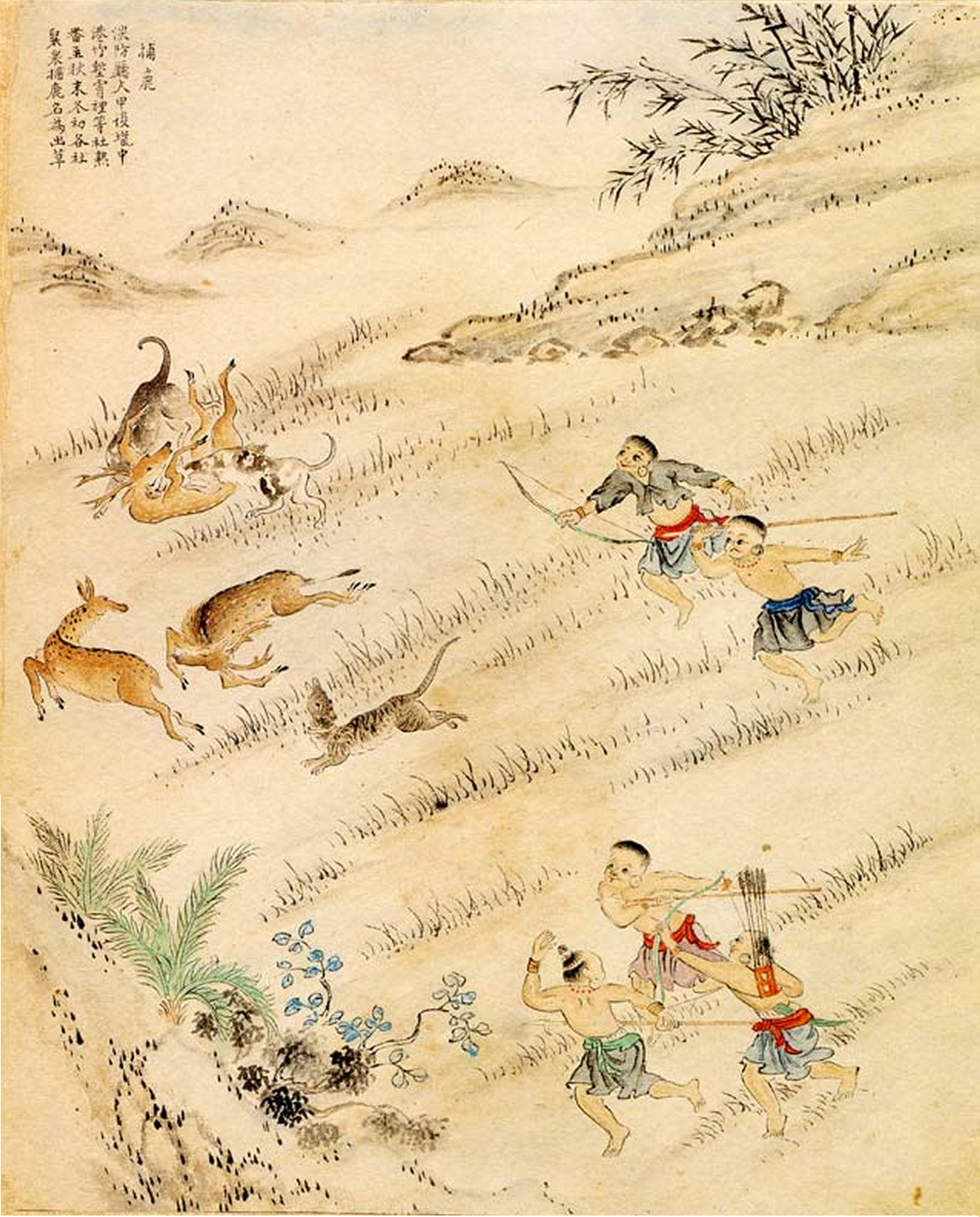
Deer-hunting Taiwanese aborigines

The current scientific consensus of the settlement of the Philippines is the Out-of-Taiwan (OOT) hypothesis (also called the Austronesian expansion). It was first proposed by Peter Bellwood and was originally based largely on linguistics, hewing very close to Robert Blust's model of the history of the Austronesian language family. It has since been strengthened by genetic and archaeological studies that broadly agree with the timeline of the Austronesian expansion.

The modern Austronesian expansion model indicates that between 4500 BC and 4000 BC, developments in agricultural technology in the Yunnan Plateau in China created pressures which drove certain peoples to migrate to Taiwan. These people either already had or began to develop a unique language of their own, now referred to as Proto-Austronesian. By around 3000 BC, these groups started differentiating into three or four distinct subcultures. By 2500 to 1500 BC, one of these groups (the ancestral Malayo-Polynesian-speakers) began migrating southwards by sea towards the Philippines, then further onwards to the Marianas Islands by 1500 BC, and the rest of Island Southeast Asia, Island Melanesia, and eventually as far as Polynesia and Madagascar. Before the expansion out of Taiwan, recent archaeological, linguistic and genetic evidence has linked Austronesian speakers in Insular Southeast Asia to cultures such as the Hemudu, Liangzhu and Dapenkeng in Neolithic China.

Historian William Henry Scott has observed that, based on lexicostatistical analysis involving seven million word pairs linguist Isidore Dyen offered in 1962, two alternative scenarios explaining the origin and spread of Austronesian languages: (a) that they originated in some Pacific island and spread westward to Asia, or (b) that they originated in Taiwan and spread southward. Based on subsequent study of the second alternative, Scott concludes that the Philippine language tree could have been introduced by Austronesian speakers as long ago as 5000 BC, probably from the north, with their descendants expanding throughout the Philippine archipelago and beyond in succeeding millennia, absorbing or replacing sparse populations already present, and their language diversifying into dozens of mutually unintelligible languages which replaced earlier ones. During those millennia, other Austronesian speakers entered the Philippines in large enough numbers to leave a linguistic mark but not to replace established languages. Scott suggested that if this scenario is correct all present Philippine languages (except for Sama–Bajaw languages, which probably have more speakers outside the Philippines than within) were produced within the archipelago, none of them being introduced by separate migration, and all of them having more in common with each other than with languages outside of the Philippines.

During this neolithic period, a trade route initially created primarily by natives of the Philippines and Taiwan was established. The route, known as the Maritime Jade Road, was one of the most extensive sea-based trade networks of a single geological material in the prehistoric world from 2000 BCE-1000 CE, much older than the Silk Road. Jade was mined in Taiwan and was processed primarily in the Philippines, where the trade route reached many places in Southeast Asia such as Vietnam, Thailand, Malaysia, and Indonesia. A "jade culture" thrived during this era, as evidenced by tens of thousands of exquisitely crafted jade artifacts found at a site in Batangas province. Jade artifacts have been found dated to 2000 BC, with the lingling-o jade items crafted in Luzon made using raw materials originating from Taiwan. During this peaceful pre-colonial period, not a single burial site studied by scholars yielded any osteological proof for violent death. No instances of mass burials were recorded as well, signifying the peaceful situation of the islands. Burials with violent proof were only found from burials beginning in the 15th century, likely due to the newer cultures of expansionism imported from India and China. When the Spanish arrived in the 16th century, they recorded some war-like groups, whose cultures have already been influenced by the imported Indian and Chinese expansionist cultures of the 15th century. By 1000 BC, the inhabitants of the archipelago had developed into four kinds of social groups: hunter-gatherer tribes, warrior societies, highland plutocracies, and port principalities.

The Austronesians that settled in the Philippines admixed with the preexisting earlier groups like the Negritos that had reached the islands via the now sunken Sundaland landmass. Genetic studies have shown that modern native Filipinos have varying degrees of Negrito ancestry in addition to the majority Austronesian ancestry.

==== Genetic studies ====
A 2002 China Medical University study indicated that some Filipinos shared genetic chromosomes that are found among Asian people, such as Taiwanese aborigines, Indonesians, Thais, and Chinese.

A 2008 genetic study by Leeds University and published in Molecular Biology and Evolution, showed that mitochondrial DNA lineages have been evolving within Island Southeast Asia (ISEA) since modern humans arrived approximately 50,000 years ago. The authors concluded that it was proof that Austronesians evolved within Island Southeast Asia and did not come from Taiwan (the "Out-of-Sundaland" hypothesis). Population dispersals occurred at the same time as sea levels rose, which resulted in migrations from the Philippine Islands into Taiwan within the last 10,000 years.

A 2013 study on the genetics and origin of Polynesian people supported the Out of Taiwan scenario of Austronesian expansion from Taiwan, at around 2200 BC, settling the Batanes Islands and northern Luzon from Taiwan. From there, they rapidly spread downwards to the rest of the islands of the Philippines and Southeast Asia. This population assimilated with the existing Negritos resulting in the modern Filipino ethnic groups which display various ratios of genetic admixture between Austronesian and Negrito groups.

However, a 2014 study published by Nature using whole genome sequencing instead of only mtDNA sequencing confirmed the north-to-south dispersal of the Austronesian peoples in the "Out-of-Taiwan" hypothesis. Researchers further pointed out that, while humans have been living in Sundaland for at least 40,000 years, Austronesian people were recent arrivals. The results of the 2008 study failed to take into account admixture with the more ancient but unrelated Negrito and Papuan populations.

A 2021 genetic study, which examined representatives of 115 indigenous communities, found evidence of at least five independent waves of early human migration. Negrito groups, divided between those in Luzon and those in Mindanao, may come from a single wave and diverged subsequently, or through two separate waves. This likely occurred sometime after 46,000 years ago. Another Negrito migration entered Mindanao sometime after 25,000 years ago. Two early East Asian waves were detected, one most strongly evidenced among the Manobo people who live in inland Mindanao, and the other in the Sama-Bajau and related people of the Sulu archipelago, Zamboanga Peninsula, and Palawan. The admixture found in the Sama people indicates a relationship with the Lua and Mlabri people of mainland Southeast Asia, and reflects a similar genetic signal found in western Indonesia. These happened sometime after 15,000 years ago and 12,000 years ago respectively, around the time the last glacial period was coming to an end. Austronesians, either from Southern China or Taiwan, were found to have come in at least two distinct waves. The first, occurring perhaps between 10,000 and 7,000 years ago, brought the ancestors of indigenous groups that today live around the Cordillera Central mountain range. Later migrations brought other Austronesian groups, along with agriculture, and the languages of these recent Austronesian migrants effectively replaced those existing populations. In all cases, new immigrants appear to have mixed to some degree with existing populations. The integration of Southeast Asia into Indian Ocean trading networks around 2,000 years ago also shows some impact, with South Asian genetic signals present within some Sama-Bajau communities.

=== Introduction of metal tools ===
Although there is some evidence early Austronesian migrants having bronze or brass tools, the earliest metal tools in the Philippines are generally said to have first been used somewhere around 500 BC, and this new technology coincided with considerable changes in the lifestyle of early Filipinos. The new tools brought about a more stable way of life, and created more opportunities for communities to grow, both in terms of size and cultural development.

Where communities once consisted of small bands of kinsmen living in campsites, larger villages came about- usually based near water, which made traveling and trading easier. The resulting ease of contact between communities meant that they began to share similar cultural traits, something which had not previously been possible when the communities consisted only of small kinship groups.

Jocano refers to the period between 500 BC and 1 AD as the incipient phase, which for the first time in the artifact record, sees the presence of artifacts that are similar in design from site to site throughout the archipelago. Along with the use of metal tools, this era also saw significant improvement in pottery technology.

The introduction of metal into the Philippines and the resulting changes did not follow the typical pattern. Robert Fox notes, "There is, for example, no real evidence of a "Bronze Age" or "Copper-Bronze Age" in the archipelago, a development which occurred in many areas of the world. The transition, as shown by recent excavation, was from stone tools to iron tools."

The earliest use of metal in the Philippines was the use of copper for ornamentation, not tools. Even when copper and bronze tools became common, they were often used side by side with stone tools. Metal only became the dominant material for tools late in this era, leading to a new phase in cultural development.

Bronze tools from the Philippines' early metal age have been encountered in various sites, but they were not widespread. This has been attributed to the lack of a local source of tin, which when combined with copper produces bronze. This lack has led most anthropologists to conclude that bronze items were imported and that those bronze smelting sites which have been found in the Philippines, in Palawan, were for re-smelting and remolding.

=== Introduction of iron tools ===
Iron Age finds in Philippines also point to the existence of trade between Tamil Nadu and the Philippine Islands during the ninth and tenth centuries B.C. When iron was introduced to the Philippines, it became the preferred material for tools and largely ended the use of stone tools. Whether the iron was imported or mined locally is still debated by scholars. Beyer thought that it was mined locally, but others point to the lack of iron smelting artifacts and conclude that the iron tools were probably imported.

Metalsmiths from this era had already developed a crude version of modern metallurgical processes, notably the hardening of soft iron through carburization.

=== Protohistory ===
==== Trade with the Sa Huynh culture ====
The Sa Huynh culture in what is now central and southern Vietnam had extensive trade with the Philippine archipelago during its height between 1000 BC and 200 AD.

Sa Huynh beads were made from glass, carnelian, agate, olivine, zircon, gold and garnet; most of these materials were not local to the region, and were most likely imported. Han Dynasty-style bronze mirrors were also found in Sa Huynh sites. Conversely, Sa Huynh produced ear ornaments have been found in archaeological sites in Central Thailand, Taiwan (Orchid Island), and in the Philippines, in the Palawan Tabon Caves. in The Kalanay Cave is a small cave located on the island of Masbate in central Philippines. The cave is located specifically at the northwest coast of the island within the municipality of Aroroy. The artifacts recovered from the site were similar to those found in Southeast Asia and South Vietnam. The site is one of the "Sa Huynh-Kalanay" pottery complex which is shares similarities with Vietnam. The type of pottery found in the site were dated 400BC-1500 AD.

==== Coastal settlements and international trade (200 AD onwards) ====
Maritime Southeast Asia began to be integrated into wider trade networks in the early centuries of the first millennium, with trade between China and the region becoming regular by the 5th century.

Fragmented ethnic groups established numerous city-states formed by the assimilation of several small political units known as barangay each headed by a Datu or headman (still in use among non-Hispanic Filipino ethnic groups) and answerable to a king, titled Rajah. Even scattered barangays, through the development of inter-island and international trade, became more culturally homogeneous by the 4th century. Hindu-Buddhist culture and religion flourished among the noblemen in this era. Many of the barangay were, to varying extents, under the de jure jurisprudence of one of several neighboring empires, among them the Malay Sri Vijaya, Javanese Majapahit, Brunei, Melaka empires, although de facto had established their own independent system of rule. Trading links with Sumatra, Borneo, Thailand, Java, China, India, Arabia, Japan and the Ryukyu Kingdom flourished during this era.

Each barangay consisted of about 100 families. Some barangays were big, such as Zubu (Cebu), Butuan, Maktan (Mactan), Mandani (Mandaue), Lalan (Liloan), Irong-Irong (Iloilo), Bigan (Vigan), and Maynila (Manila). Each of these big barangays had a population of more than 2,000.

In the earliest times, the items which were prized by the peoples included jars, which were a symbol of wealth throughout South Asia, and later metal, salt and tobacco. In exchange, the peoples would trade feathers, rhino horn, hornbill beaks, beeswax, birds nests, resin, rattan.^{2} Wrought iron were produced and processed in the Philippines and exported to Taiwan.

In the period between the 7th century to the beginning of the 15th century, numerous prosperous centers of trade had emerged, including Namayan which flourished alongside Manila Bay, Cebu, Iloilo, Butuan, Pangasinan, Pampanga and Aparri (which specialized in trade with Japan and the Kingdom of Ryukyu in Okinawa).

== See also ==
- Emergence of agriculture in the Philippines
- Cultural achievements of pre-colonial Philippines
- Shell tools in the Philippines
- Stegodon
- Barangay (pre-colonial)
- Prehistoric Asia
- Prehistory of Marinduque
- Prehistory of Pampanga
- Prehistory of Sarangani
- Dambana
- Suyat
- History of the Philippines
- History of the Philippines (Pre-Colonial Era 900–1565)
- History of the Philippines (Spanish Era 1565–1898)
- History of the Philippines (American Era 1898–1946)
- History of the Philippines (Third Republic 1946–65)
- History of the Philippines (Marcos Era 1965–86)
- History of the Philippines (Contemporary Era 1986–present)
