= Cuisine of pre-colonial Philippines =

Indigenous culinary traditions of the Philippines

Pre-colonial Philippine cuisine is composed of food practices of the indigenous people of the Philippines. Different groups of people within the islands had access to different crops and resources which resulted in differences in the way cooking was practiced. Native fruits, root crops, nuts and vegetables were eaten in the islands such as mango, pili nuts, coconut, ginger, etc. Meat and seafood was eaten all over the islands while certain Muslim groups did not consume the likes of pork and shellfish.

== Accounts of Filipino cooking ==
Various accounts of the foodstuffs Pre-colonial Filipinos had which can be assumed some of the dishes they now have are from/since ancient times.

“Under that shell there is a white marrowy substance one finger in thickness, which they eat fresh with meat and fish as we do bread; and it has a taste resembling the almond. It could be dried and made into bread. There is a clear, sweet water in the middle of that marrowy substance which is very refreshing. When that water stands for a while after having been collected, it congeals and becomes like an apple. When the natives wish to make oil, they take that cocoanut, and allow the marrowy substance and the water to putrefy. Then they boil it and it becomes oil like butter. When they wish to make vinegar, they allow only the water to putrefy, and then place it in the sun, and a vinegar results like [that made from] white wine. Milk can also be made from it for we made some. We scraped that marrowy substance and then mixed the scrapings with its own water which we strained through a cloth, and so obtained milk like goat’s milk. Those palms resemble date-palms, but although not smooth they are less knotty than the latter. A family of x persons can be supported on two trees, by utilizing them week about for the wine; for if they did otherwise, the trees would dry up. They last a century.”

— Pigafetta

Cooking methods such as using bamboo to cook rice and meat has been reported, “Rice is cooked there under the fire in bamboos or in wood; and it lasts better than that cooked in earthen pots.”
