= Maitum anthropomorphic pottery =

Earthenware secondary burial vessels

Maitum anthropomorphic burial jars
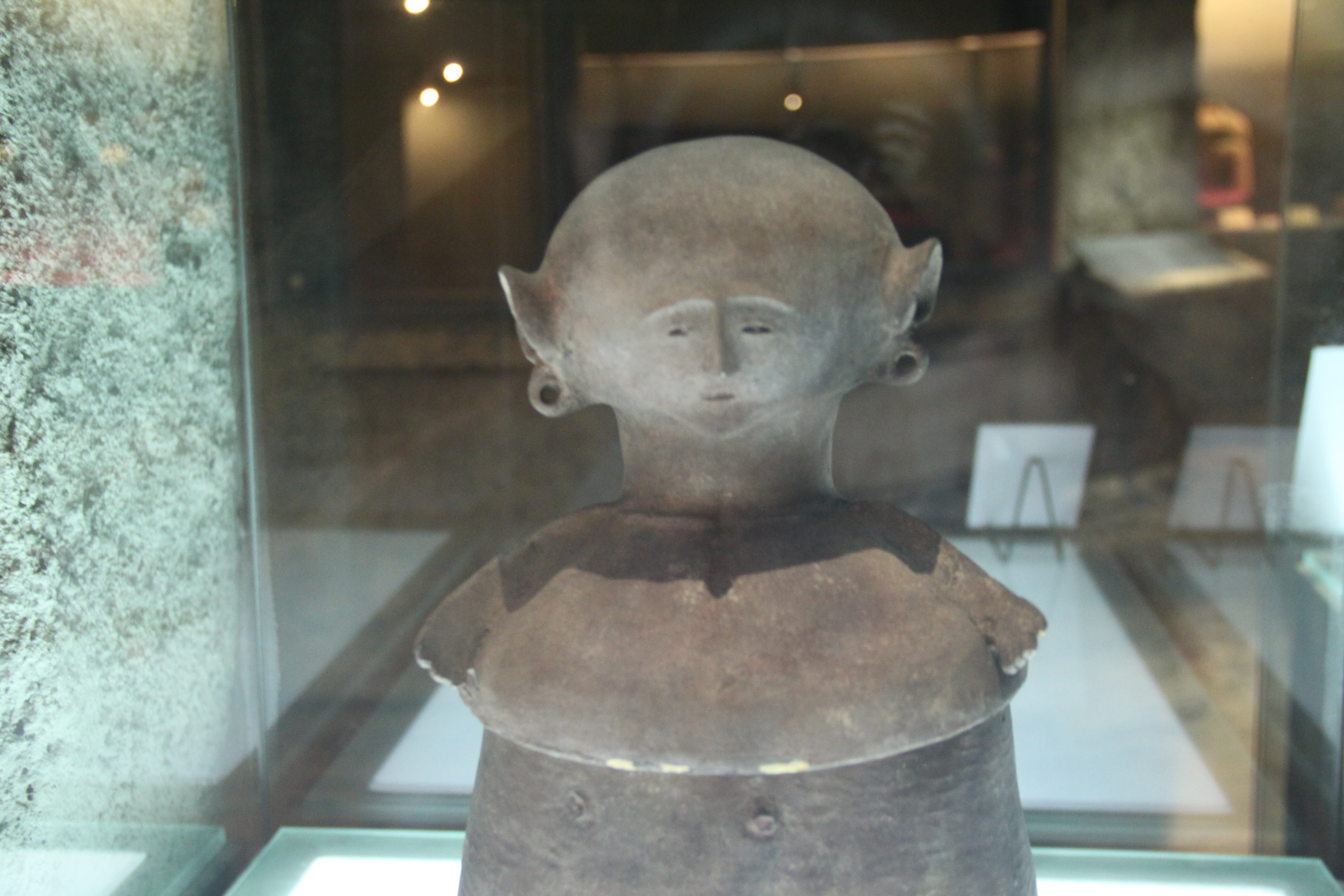
- A complete burial jar from Maitum
- Material: Earthenware
- Height: 70 cm (28 in)
- Width: 36 cm (14 in)
- Created: Iron Age
- Discovered: 1991; Ayub Cave, Maitum, Sarangani Province, Mindanao, Philippines
- Present location: National Museum of the Philippines
- Culture: Filipino

The Maitum anthropomorphic burial jars are earthenware secondary burial vessels discovered in 1991 by the National Museum of the Philippines' archaeological team in Ayub Cave, Barangay Pinol, Maitum, Sarangani Province, Mindanao, Philippines. The jars are anthropomorphic; characterized by a design that suggests human figures with complete or partial facial features of the first inhabitants of Mindanao. Furthermore, they give emphasis to the Filipinos’ popular belief of life after death.

According to Eusebio Dizon, head of the archaeological team, this type of burial jars are "remarkably unique and intriguing" because they have not been found elsewhere in Southeast Asia. Thus, many archaeologists from Vietnam, Thailand, Malaysia, Laos, Cambodia, Burma and Indonesia gained interest on this initial find and a number of archaeological – either government or privately sponsored – excavations have been conducted to recover these artifacts.

These jars have characteristics that belong to the Developed Metal Age Period in the Philippines [calibrated date of 190 BC to 500 AD]. According to the laboratory results determined through radiocarbon dating, these secondary burial jars date back to the Metal Age. Two conventional dates were 1830 +/-60 B.P. [calibrated date of AD 70 to 370] and 1920 +/- 50 B.P. [calibrated date of 5 BC to 225 AD]. Experts used soot samples taken from the walls of a small earthenware vessel found inside one of the larger burial jars.

== Discovery ==
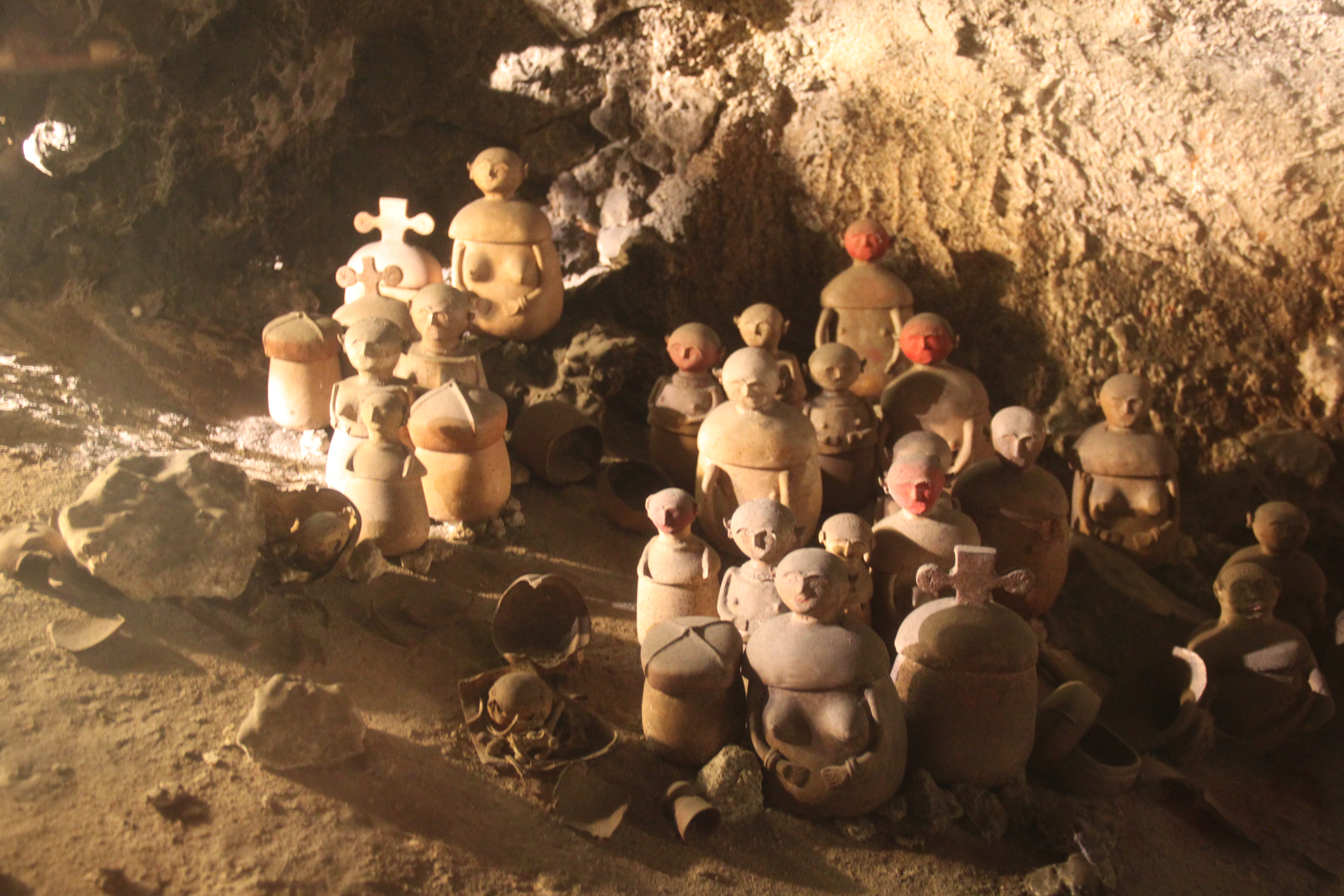
Diorama of the positions of the burial jars in Ayub Cave

The information about “potteries bearing human forms encountered while treasure hunting for Pacific War treasures” was shared through a phone call, on June 3, 1991, between a consulting geologist named Michael Spadafora and an archaeologist named Eusebio Dizon. Three days after, the archaeologist received photographs of exceptional artifacts collected by local residents. The artifacts have high probability of significance not only to the history of Maguindanao, but also to the entire Philippine prehistory. That is why when they found a fund sponsor for Dizon's trip to Mindanao, he still went despite the unpredictable climate and safety risks.

The Maitum Archaeological Project of the National Museum team formally started on November 6, 1991. Ayub Cave, now referred to as Pinol Cave, is a Miocene limestone formation located approximately 1,000 meters due south of the Mindanao shoreline with an elevation of 6 meters. The site is on the coastal area of Pinol, Maitum (formerly a part of South Cotobato Province), Sarangani. The first phase of the excavation ended in December 1991, the second was from April 8 to May 3, 1992, and the third and final phase was from January 17 to February 15, 1995.

The conflict between the Armed Forces of the Philippines and the Moro Islamic Liberation Front (MILF) during the 70's resulted in irreversible casualties in this historical site. It threatened future discoveries and prevented preservation. No complete Maitum jar in the form of a female has survived, but there are still evidence of its existence such as the many pottery shards of female breasts. This is an indication of equality in terms of the practice of jar burials.

Altogether, a total of 29 burial jars and approximately 33 baskets or about 4 cubic meters of archaeological material have been collected. Most of them are now in the possession and care of the National Museum while some are on display at the second level of Maitum Municipal Hall in an exhibit called, "The Treasures of Maitum". And because of its significance, the Pinol Cave was declared by the National Museum of the Philippines as an “Important Cultural Property” on May 5, 2009.

== Physical characteristics ==
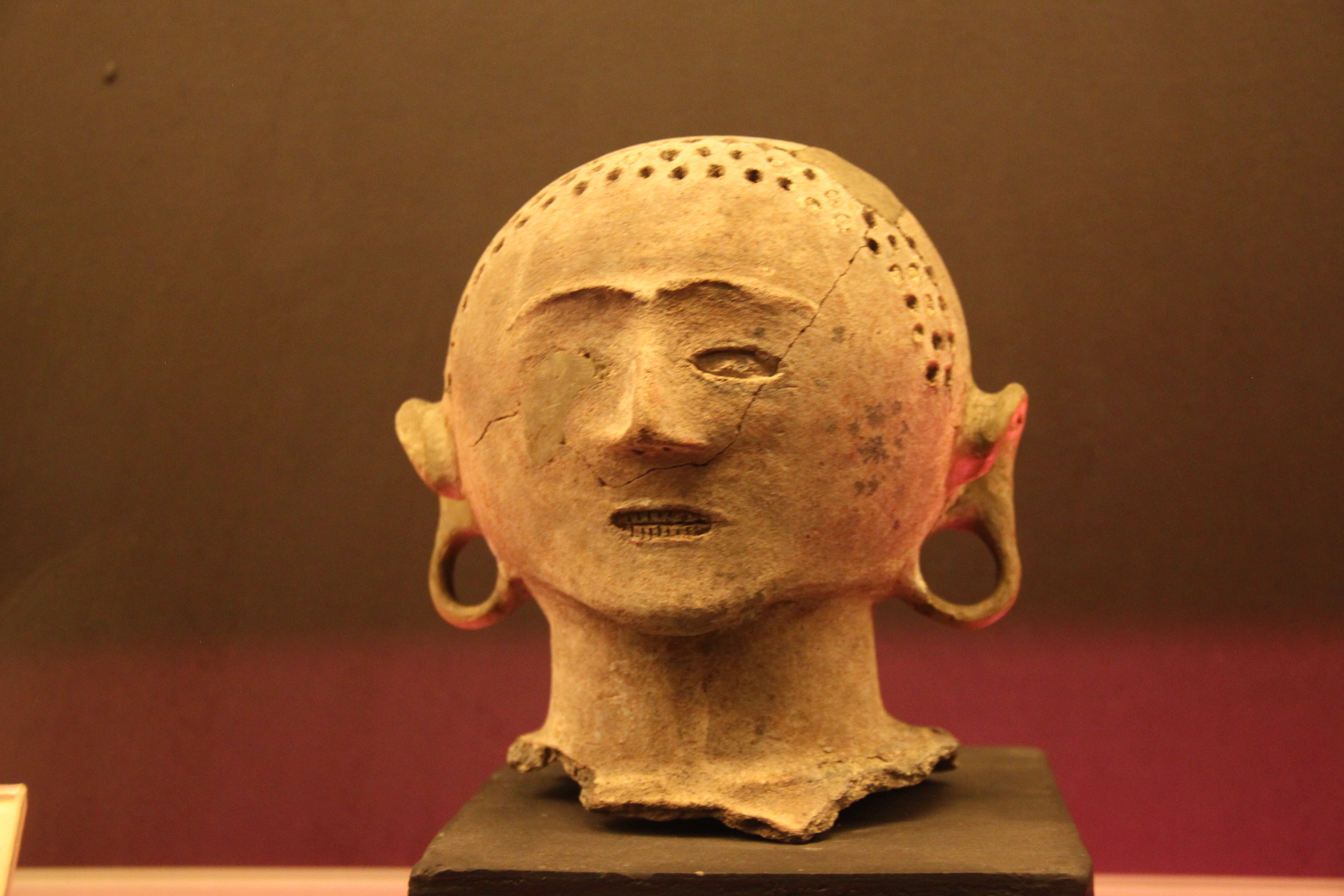
Detail on a jar cover molded into a human head

Even though the burial jars are similar to that of the pottery found in Kulaman Plateau, Southern Mindanao and many more excavation sites here in the Philippines, what makes the Maitum jars uniquely different is how the anthropomorphic features depict “specific dead persons whose remains they guard”.

So far, there have been four classified kinds of cover and lid: (1) Anthropomorphic motif or head, (2) Trunconical with simple appliquéd design, (3) Simple ovaloid with four ear handles, and (4) Trunconical with adz shape and round spinning shape motif. While there are three types of heads: (1) Plain, (2) Perforated, and (3) Painted red and black from hematite and organic material. The black paint may indicate where the hair of the dead has once been.

Some jars are decorated with glass beads and shell scoops, spoons and pendants. All of these features represent and reflect the Maitum potters’ creativity and thinking abilities.

=== Heads ===
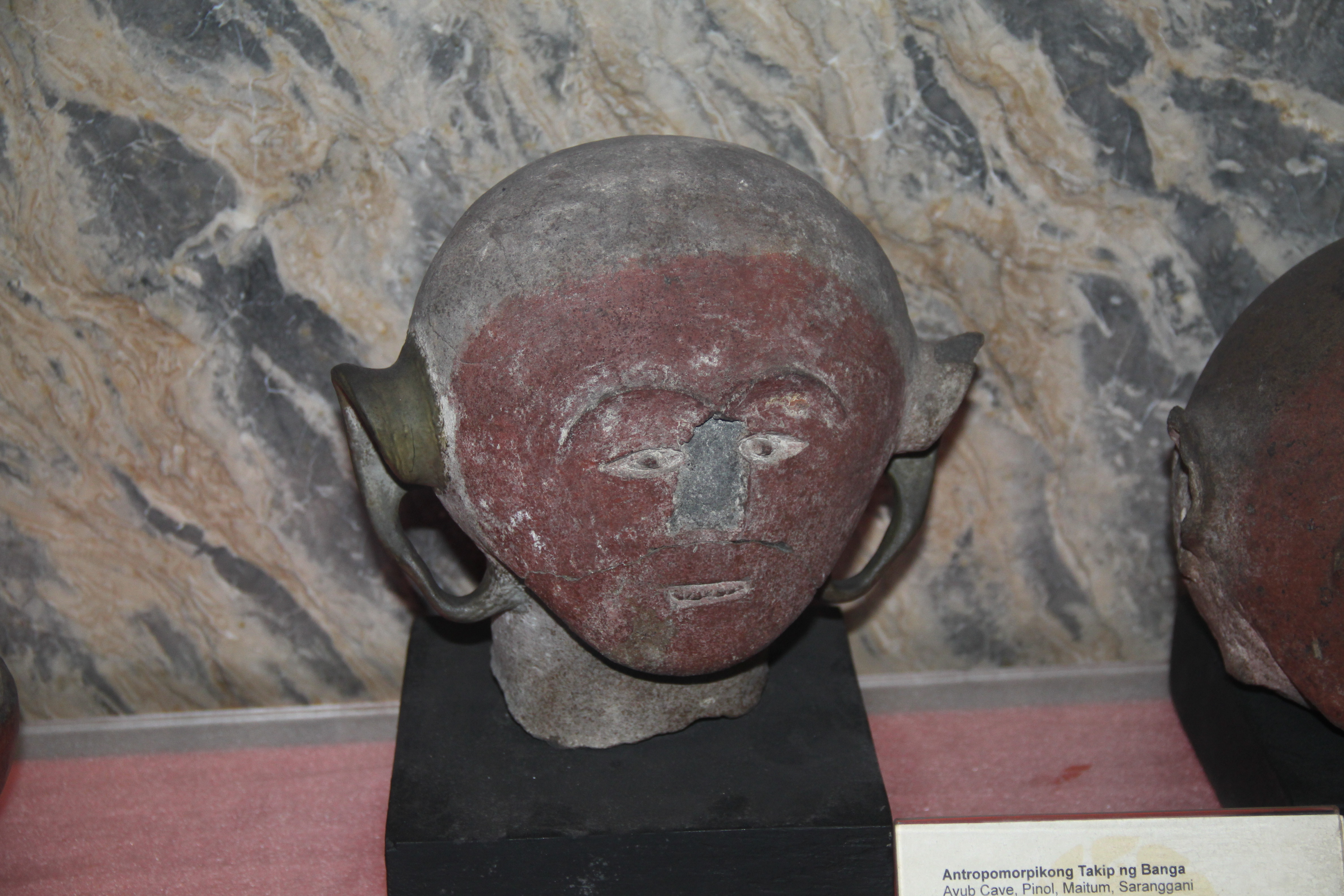
A burial jar with a red-painted face

The heads of the anthropomorphic covers portray different facial expressions and emotions, ranging from happiness and contentment to sadness and grief. Other heads also display full sets of teeth; others appear to be toothless (way by which the chin and lips recede).

The method of shaping the head is rather similar from the standard potting technique of creating a round pot with a high or long neck. The presence of paint may be an indication of status, while the size of the heads is an indication of age.

=== Eyes ===
Since the eyes are believed to be expressive, the eyes portrayed in Maitum jars are given high regard in describing the dead. The eyes are classified to four major shapes: (1) almond, (2) ovaloid, (3) round and (4) rectangular.

There is also a variation between the eyelids of different individuals. Some are incised, appliquéd, protruding and flat. In addition, some eyes are ringed with black hematite paints.

=== Ears ===
The ears either have (1) a hole in the center or (2) an ovaloid shape with an extended curl. In the former style, the upper outer ear is formed into an ovaloid shaped with a hole in the center while the lower outer ear is formed by a lobe. On the other hand, the latter style explains the formation of the upper outer ear into an ovaloid shape with an extended curl going inside and the lower outer part consisting of the earlobe.

=== Nose ===
The base of the nose are either (1) triangular, (2) concave, (3) beaklike or (4) bulbous.

=== Mouth ===
The mouth is generally distinguished by how many teeth are showing. Some mouth hold (1) two rows of incised teeth, (2) one row of incised teeth, (3) two rows of teeth and tongue, (4) row of teeth with holes on each base, or (5) one row of teeth with a hole in the middle of each tooth. To several who have no teeth, the feature is only a gaping hole with a tongue.

=== Arms and Hands ===
The most common type of arms and hands are appliquéd and molded. These human-like forms were associated with metal implements like bracelets.

=== Breasts ===
These feature were either applied or molded, and may be classified into male or female breasts with other qualities that may give hints on the age of the dead. To differentiate, male breasts are usually molded marked by a light curve topped with a nipple. On the other hand, several of the female breasts have no nipples distinguished by a shallow protrusion, and slightly sloping.

=== Measurements ===
The obtained measurements of Maitum jars without its anthropomorphic lid has the height of 43.5 cm, widest diameter of 36 cm, widest mouth diameter of 30 cm and a thickness of 0.7 cm. The shape was more of the torso of a male body. From the shoulder to the elbow, the arms measure 12 cm and, consequently, 17 cm from the elbow to the fingers. Along with its cover, the burial jar is noted to have a total height of 70 cm.
