= Bolinao Skull =

Archaeological discovery in the Philippines

- Year: 14th-15th century
- Type: Skull
- Dimensions: 11.5 mm × 10 mm (0.45 in × 0.39 in)
- Location: National Museum of Anthropology, Manila
- Owner: National Museum of the Philippines

The Bolinao Skull is an archaeological discovery excavated at the Balingasay Archaeological Site in Bolinao, Pangasinan in the Philippines. The Bolinao Skull is considered to be a one-of-a-kind find due to its gold dental decorations that resemble fish scales. This human skull find paved the way for further study of ornamental, burial, and trade practices by the people of the Philippines, particularly during the pre-Spanish period.

== History ==
The Bolinao Skull was discovered during an excavation led by archaeologists from the National Museum of the Philippines. Its distinct feature is dental decorations made of gold. At the Balingasay Site in Bolinao, Pangasinan, Philippines, archaeologists excavated 67 skulls, all of which had their teeth decorated in gold and were found with tradeware ceramics dating to the early Ming Dynasty in China circa 15th century AD. The ornaments measure 10 millimeters wide by 11.5 millimeters in height. The gold scales were observed to be on the buccal surface of the upper and lower incisor and canine teeth.

The teeth were found to have had holes drilled in them, filled by gold disks, plugs, pegs, or wire. Each type of ornament has a unique design.

=== Excavation ===
The Bolinao Skull dates to the 14th and 15th century AD and was likely an inhabitant of Pangasinan. This discovery reveals the ornate method of decorating teeth that was part of native Philippine culture before the Spanish occupation in 1521. The Bolinao Skull is on display at the Pang-ulo Exhibit, at the National Museum of Anthropology, a component museum of the National Museum of the Philippines.

== History of gold dental-work ==
Before the Spanish arrived in the Philippines, decorating teeth was a common practice. From staining them red or black, to decorating them with gold scales, the practice of dental decoration was a status symbol for Filipinos. Zumbroich and Salvador-Amores reported that eight out of the fifty-one burials unearthed from the 14th-15th century cemetery site in Bolinao had dentitions with gold ornamentations. Evidence of deliberate teeth dyeing was pointed out by the discoloration in the frontal teeth only. Other evidence of gold decorations was found in the Calatagan Peninsula. According to Pigafetta, the Visayans also practiced decorative dentistry. Upon meeting Rajah Siaui of Butuan, he described him as having “three spots of gold on every tooth” with "teeth [appearing] as if bound with gold". Tooth goldwork was called pusad, and the mananusad was the professional dental worker who was paid for his services.

In more recent times, dentists used gold to fill cavities because the metal is soft and does not decay. For these same reasons, gold was used for dental decoration in the pre-colonial era. The gold would be made into pegs put in the teeth; a painful procedure. Teeth goldwork, therefore, was a sign of social status and of strength and bravery.

== Terms ==
Pusad: Tooth goldwork.

Mananusad: Dental worker with tooth goldwork specialization.

Halop: Gold covering, gold plating (secured by pegs, caps extending beyond the gum line, and rivets running through the tooth).

Bansil: Gold pegs.

Ulok: A thumbnail-shaped awl used to drill into the tooth to insert the bansil, and filed even with the surface of the incisor teeth.
