= Nestor's Cup =

Nestor's cup, the Cup of Nestor or the Nestor Cup may refer to:

- Nestor's Cup (mythology), legendary golden cup owned by the mythical hero Nestor and described in Book 11 of the Iliad
- Nestor's Cup (Mycenae), golden cup discovered in a shaft grave at Mycenae, so named for its similarities to the cup described in the Iliad
- Nestor's Cup (Pithekoussai), clay cup discovered at Pithekoussai, Italy, which has an inscription referring to the legendary cup
- The Nestor Cup, a Gaelic football trophy awarded annually to the winner of the Connacht Senior Football Championship
