= Jar burial =

Burial in a ceramic vessel

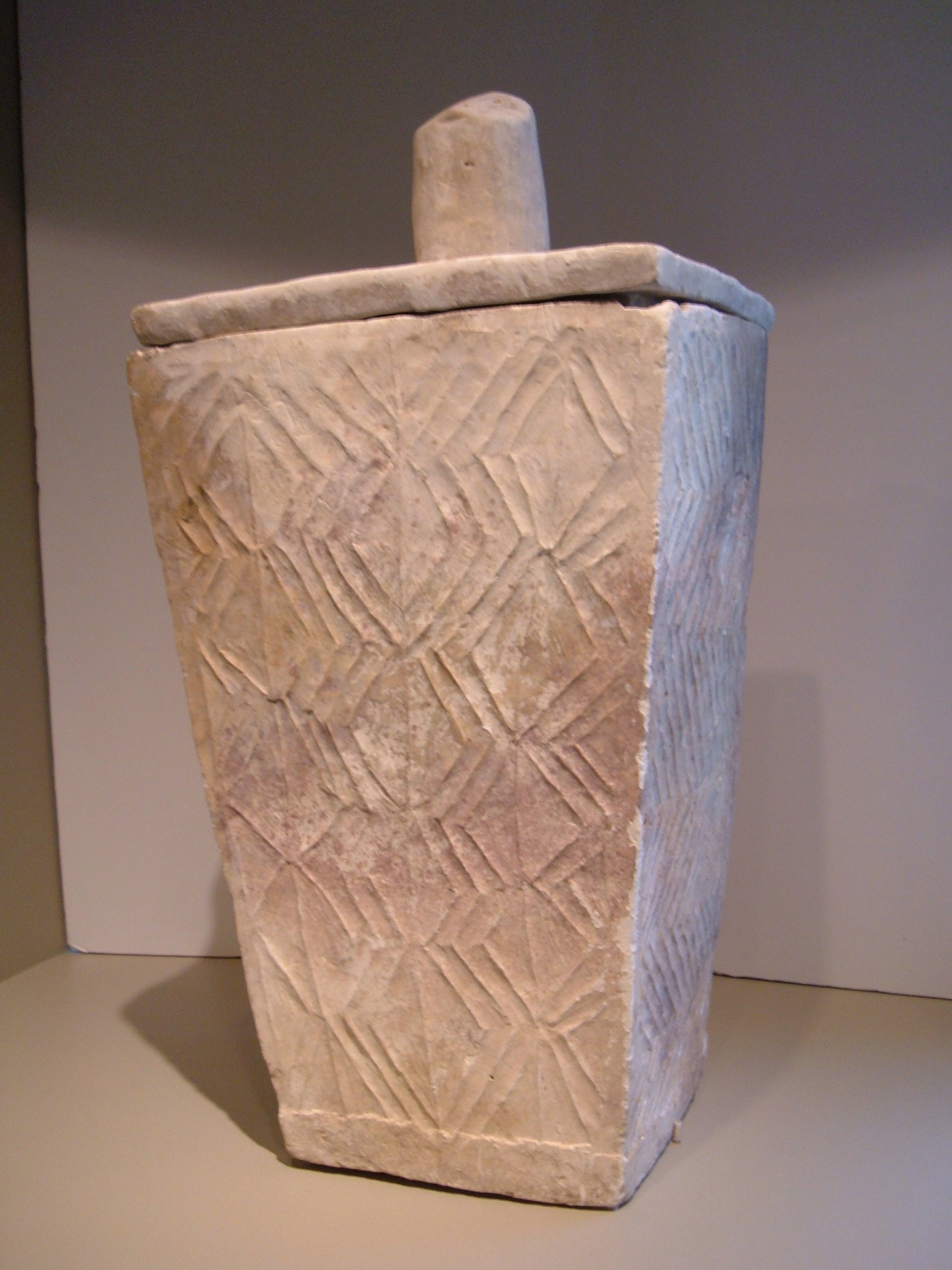
Limestone burial urn from Cotabato, Philippines, dated approximately 600 CE

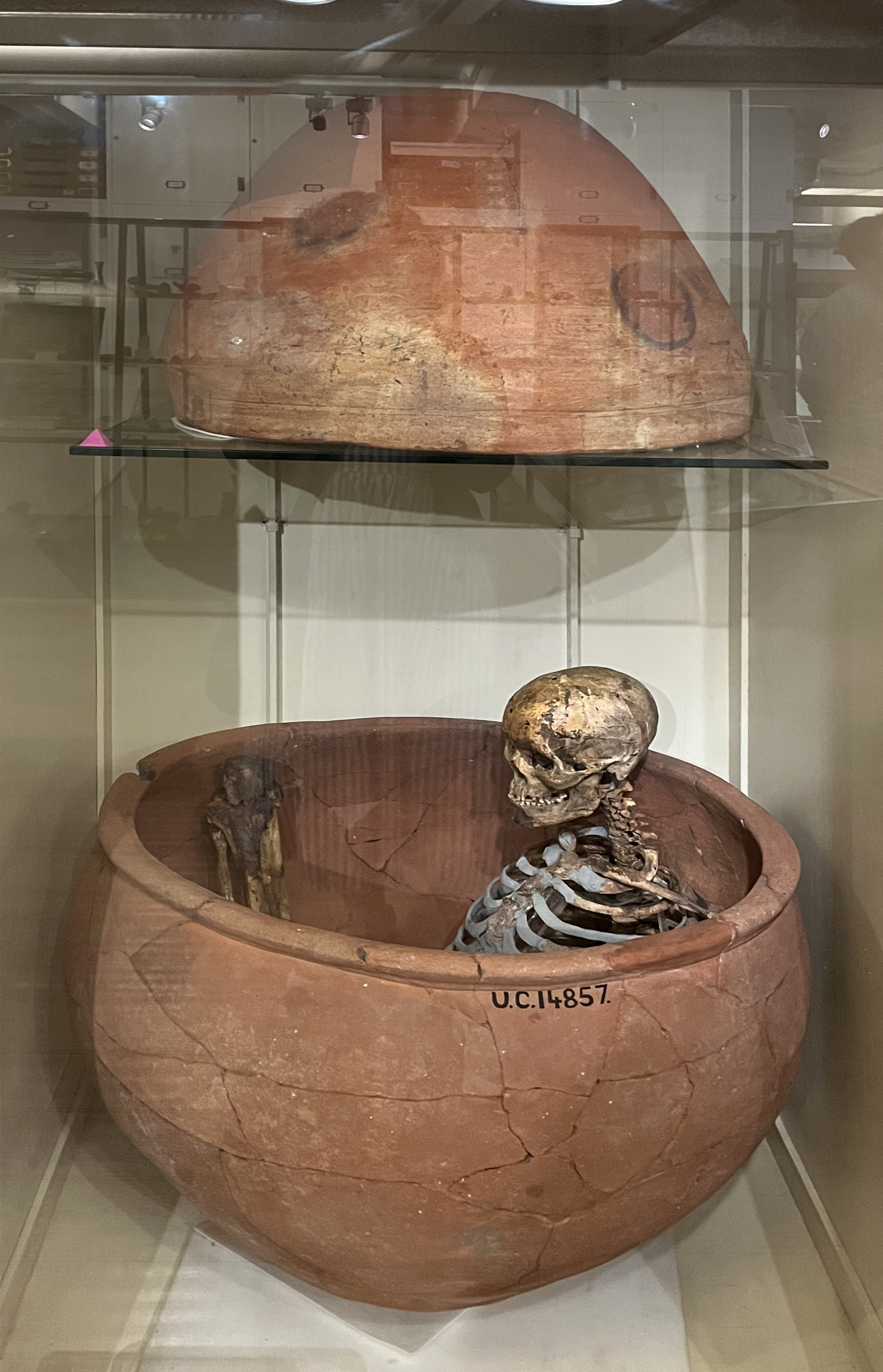
Pot burial from El Badari, Egypt. Late-Predynastic to Proto-Dynastic, circa 3000 BCE. Petrie Museum

Jar burial is a human burial custom where the corpse is placed into a large earthenware container and then interred. Jar burials are a repeated pattern at a site or within an archaeological culture. When an anomalous burial is found in which a corpse or cremated remains have been interred, it is not considered a "jar burial".

Jar burial can be traced to various regions across the globe. It was practiced as early as 4500 BCE, and as recently as the 15th–17th centuries CE. Areas of jar burial excavations include India, Indonesia, Lebanon, Palestine, Taiwan, Japan, Cambodia, Iran, Syria, Sumatra, Egypt, Malaysia, the Philippines, Thailand, Vanuatu, and Vietnam. These different locations had different methods, accoutrements, and rationales behind their jar burial practices. Cultural practices included primary versus secondary burial, burial offerings (bronze or iron tools and weapons; bronze, silver, or gold ornaments; wood, stone, clay, glass, paste) in or around burials, and social structures represented in the location and method of jar placement.

Among many cultures, a period of waiting occurs between the first burial and a second burial which often coincides with the duration of decomposition. The origin of this practice is considered to be the different concepts of death held by these cultures. In such societies, death is held to involve a slow change, a passage from the visible society of the living to the invisible one of the dead. During the period of decomposition, the corpse is sometimes treated as if it were alive, provided with food and drink, and surrounded by company. For example, some groups on the island of Borneo attach mystical importance to the disintegration of the body, sometimes collecting and carefully disposing of the liquids produced by decomposition.

== Methods ==
The custom of jar burial was employed by peoples who chose this practice for primary or secondary burial. Primary burial refers to the acts performed on the body immediately after death. In some cases, primary jar burial was more difficult to carry out. In Cretan societies, the dead body would be bound tightly to fit into the desired jar. This was believed to be originally intended for infants and small children, but evolved to include larger categories of adults. Adult burial, however, required much larger jars, deeper graves, and more manpower. In Egyptian societies, the body also could be sat upright, and then the jar would be forced on top of the body. Egyptians also would place the body into the jar themselves, rather than pushing the jar downwards, but this would create a need for a lid. Lids were not always ceramic; some have been found to be as simple as a rock or another jar. It seems the preference of how the body was placed did not have any particular significance.

Secondary burials are performed on bodies that have already been buried. The allotted time between primary and secondary burials varies between cultures; however, an emphasis is placed on waiting until the body has decomposed, and thus whatever technique is carried out as "secondary" concerns only bones lacking flesh. In this type of jar burial, the bones (flesh removed) were cleaned and subsequently put in a jar.

== Jar additions ==
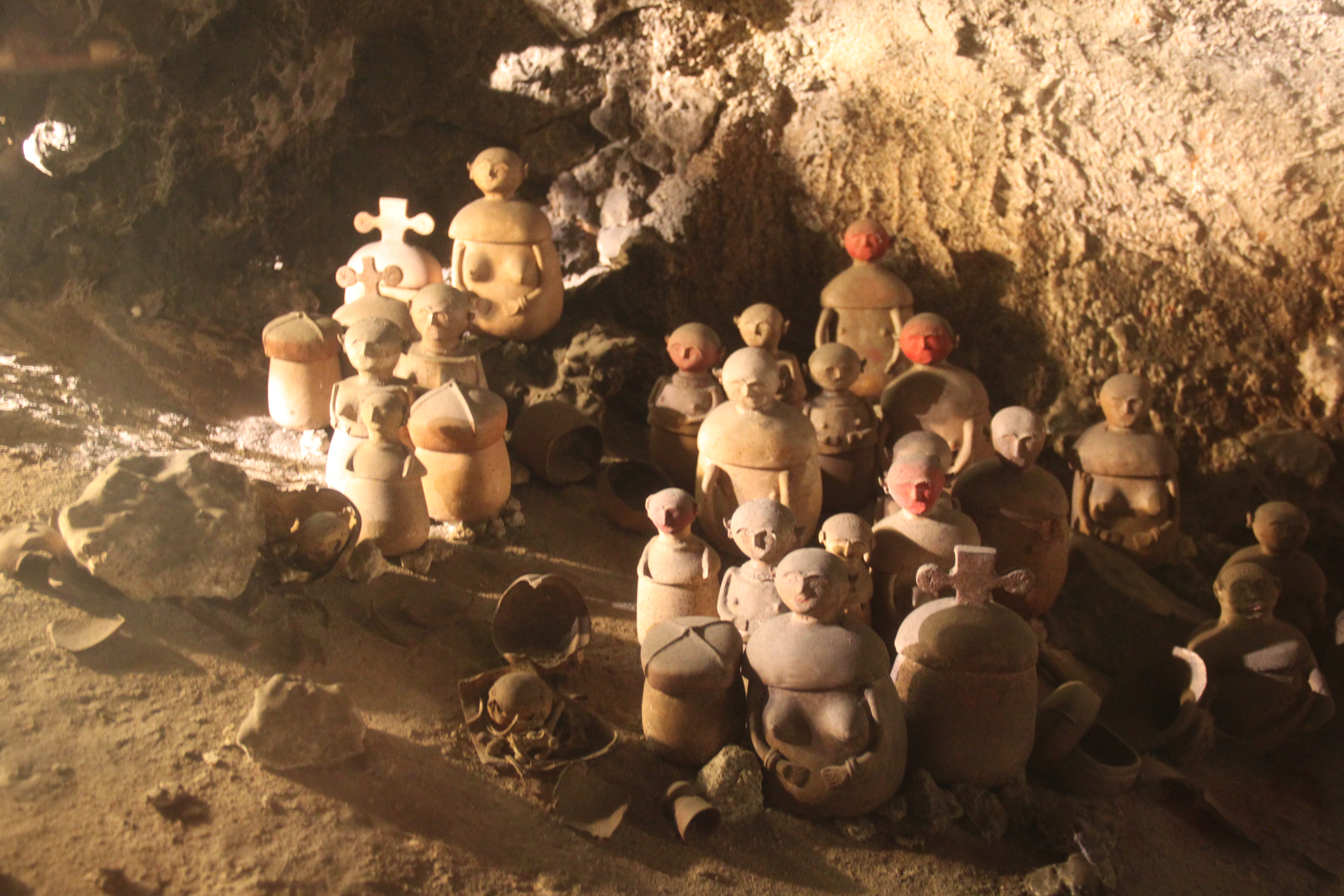
Diorama of the positions of Maitum cave burial jars from Mindanao, Philippines in the National Museum of the Philippines. Most of the jars containing human remains had anthropomorphic details, including arms, breasts, and a lid cover shaped like a human head

Types of jars and additional components vary between locations and cultures. A jar’s shape can indicate the prestige or social level of the deceased; or it can simply be a commonplace jar. Funerary offerings are sometimes placed in or around the jar, revealing more information about the value people attributed to certain items.

=== Decoration ===
In ancient Greece, pithoi were typical storage jars, and were commonly used for burials. They have vertical round-to-oval handles. Carvings on jars have also been found, sometimes depicting local divine beings of the time. This is thought to have assisted in the individual's passage to the afterlife. The carvings on jars are not standardized, meaning there is no particular pattern of a certain carving on multiple jars. Most carvings have been observed in Egypt.

Some jars are specifically manufactured for jar burials, due to the varying size of bodies and grave sites available to different cultures.

=== Accoutrements ===
Many jar burial sites are accompanied by more than just the skeletons and jars. Beads, swords, mirrors, and other animal bones have been found in and around jars. In the Cardamom Mountains, a large number of beads have been found in jars. These are most likely offerings to the deceased, in the same way that tombs have gifts in them. The presence of these beads and other offerings gives great insight into the lifestyle of the people. By studying the materials and the methods the beads were made by, researchers have been able to link various cultures together based on their likely trade operations—how they obtained exotic beads beyond what was typical of their own culture.

== Gallery ==
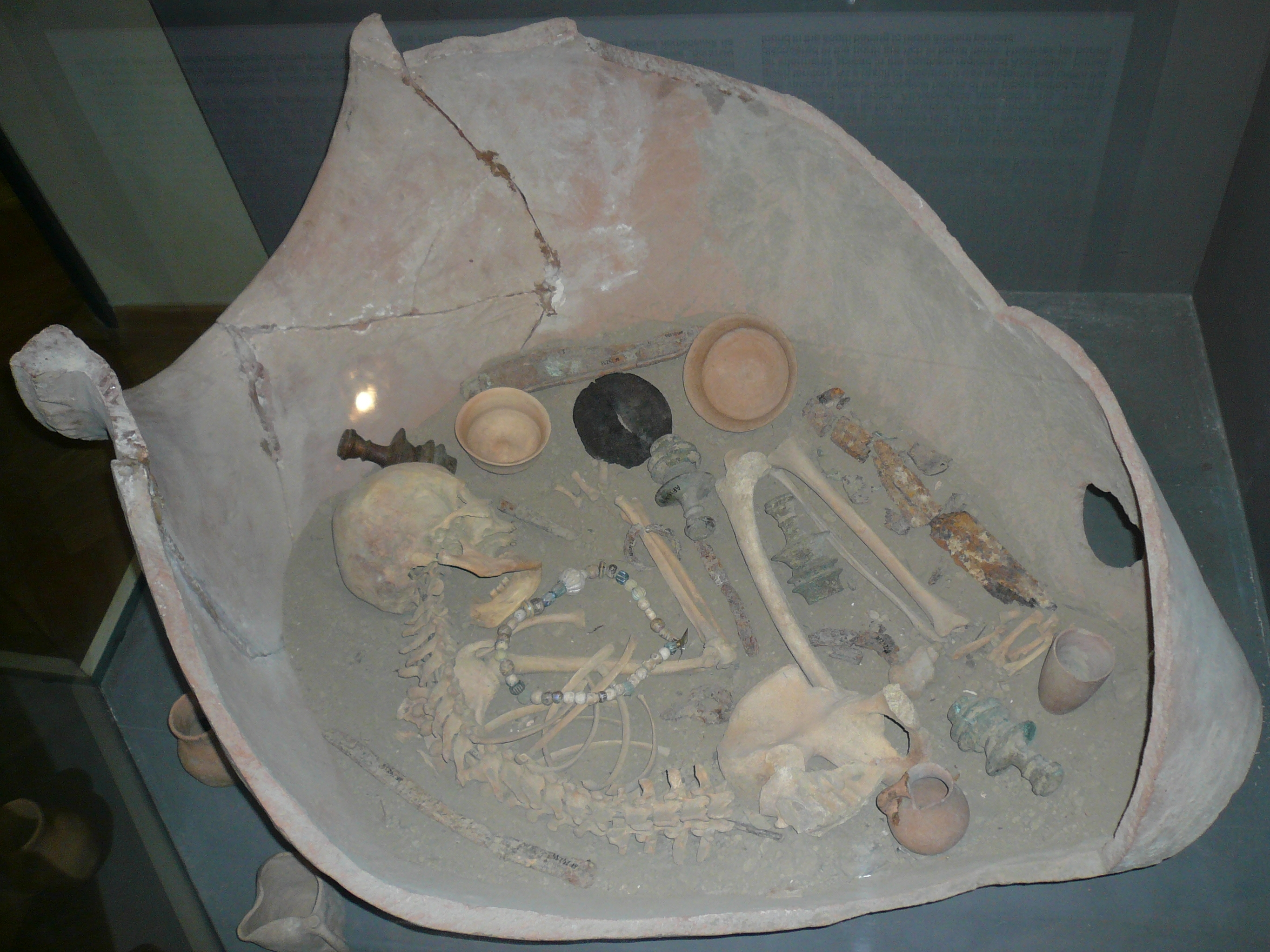
Woman in a burial jar from the Jar-Burial culture of Mingachevir, Azerbaijan

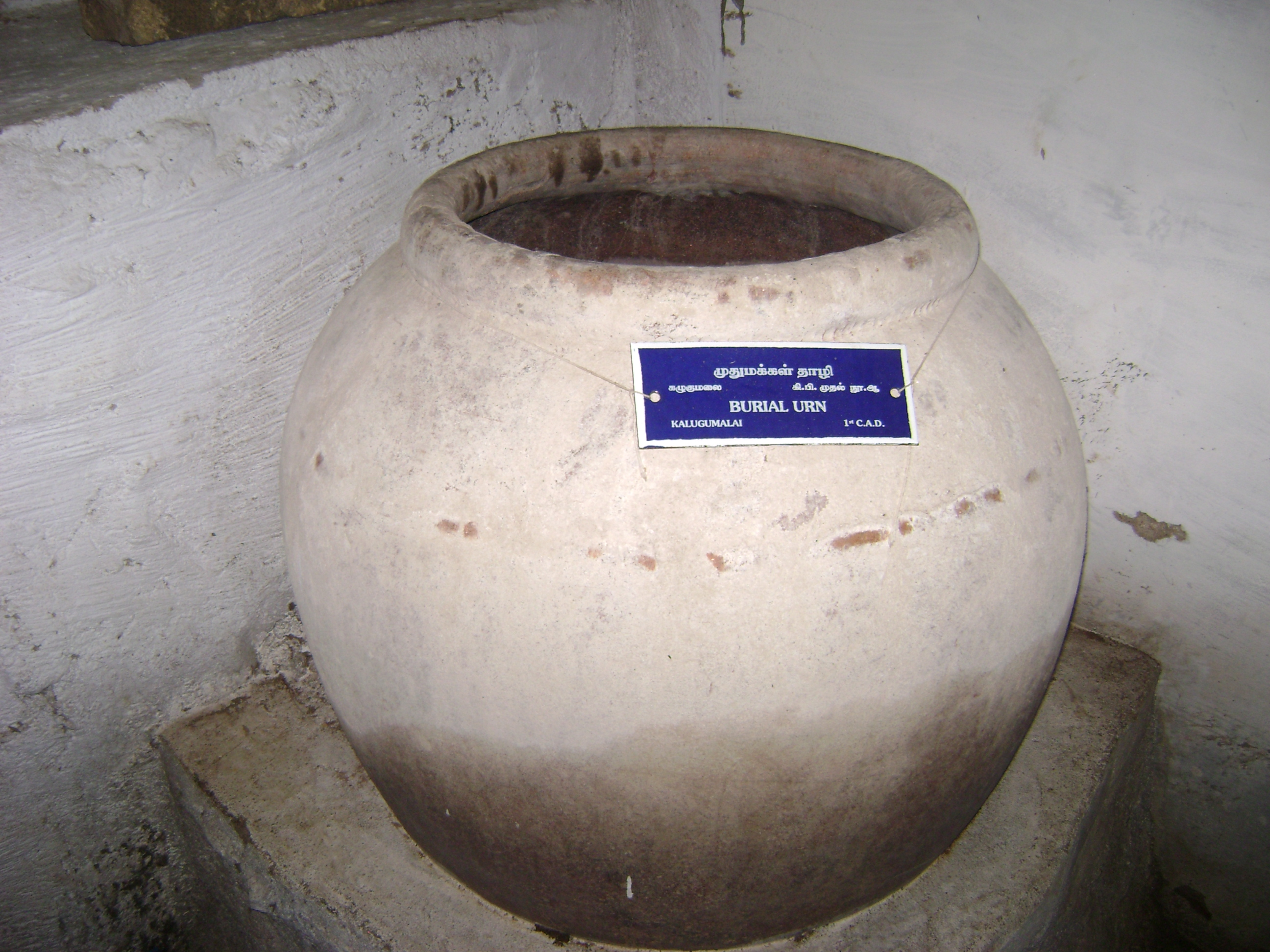
A burial jar from the 1st century CE in Kalugumalai, Tamil Nadu (displayed in Folk Arts Museum, Courtallam)

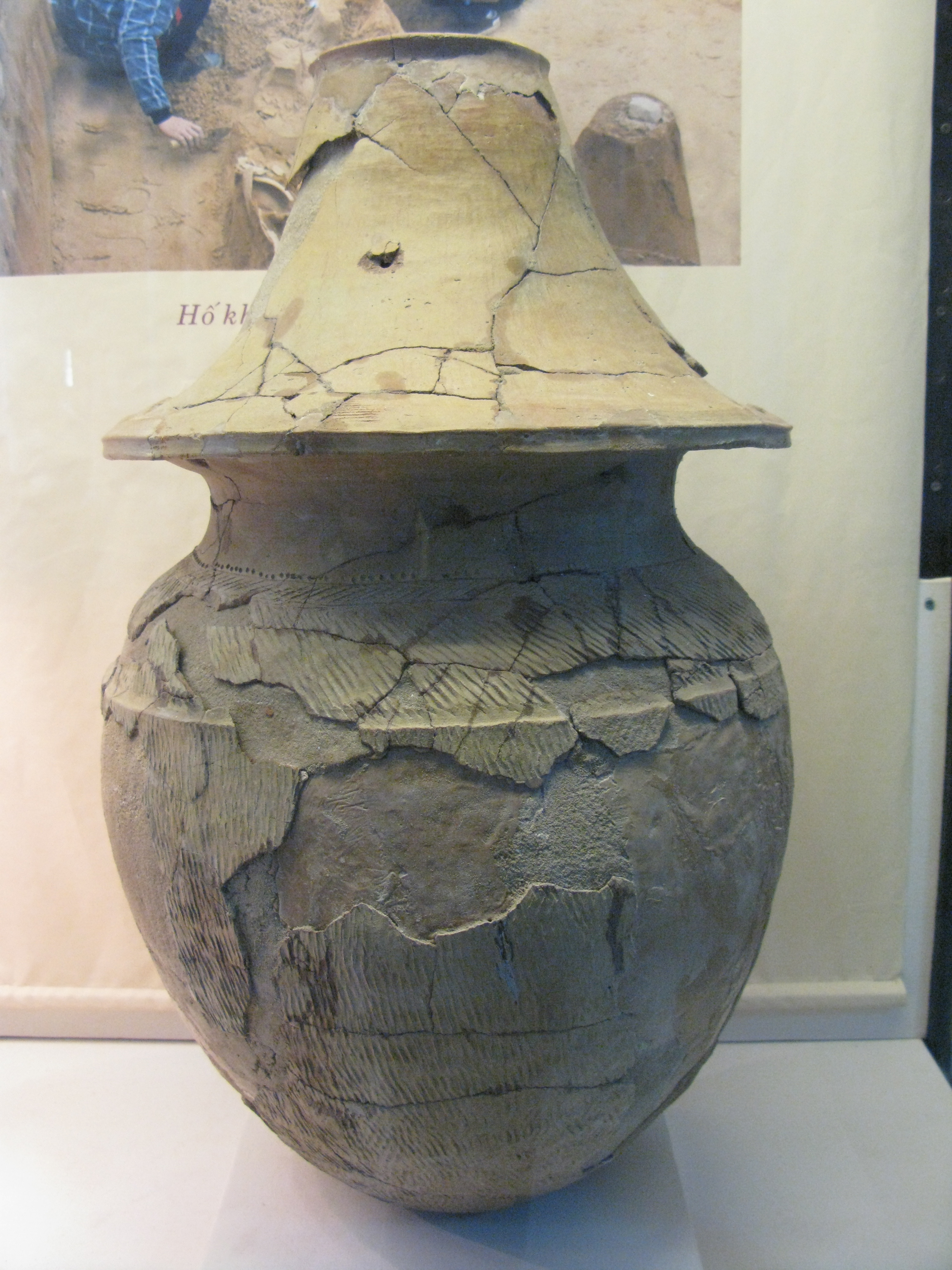
Burial jar from the Sa Huỳnh culture of Vietnam

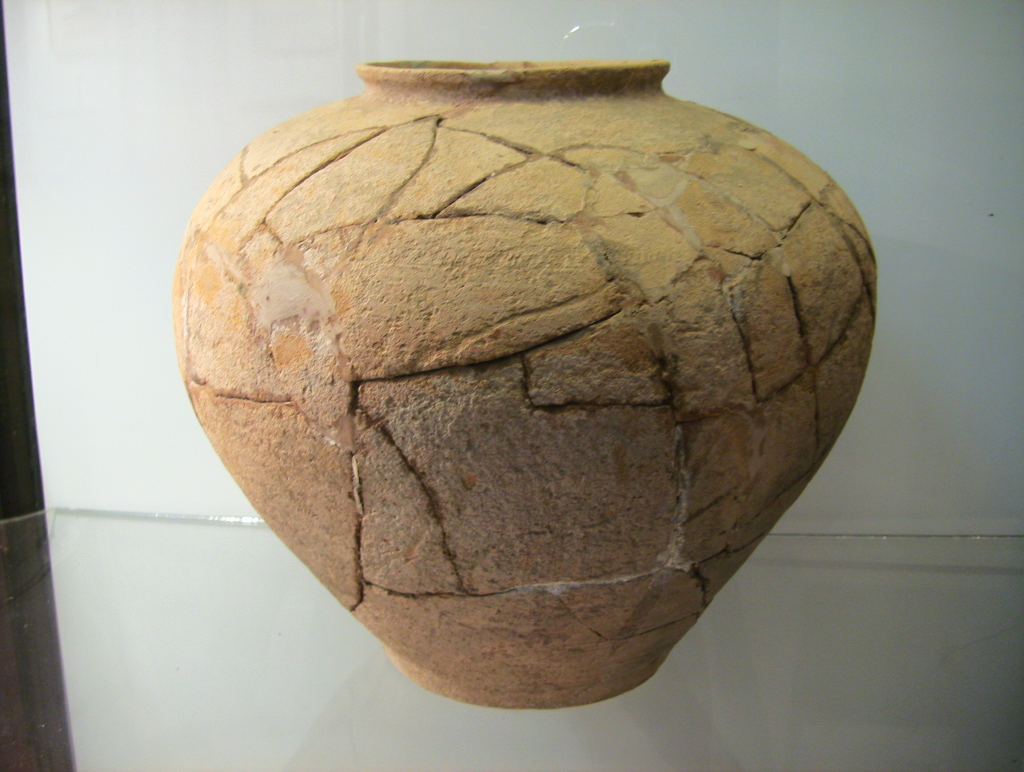
Burial jar from the Cát Tiên archaeological site of Vietnam

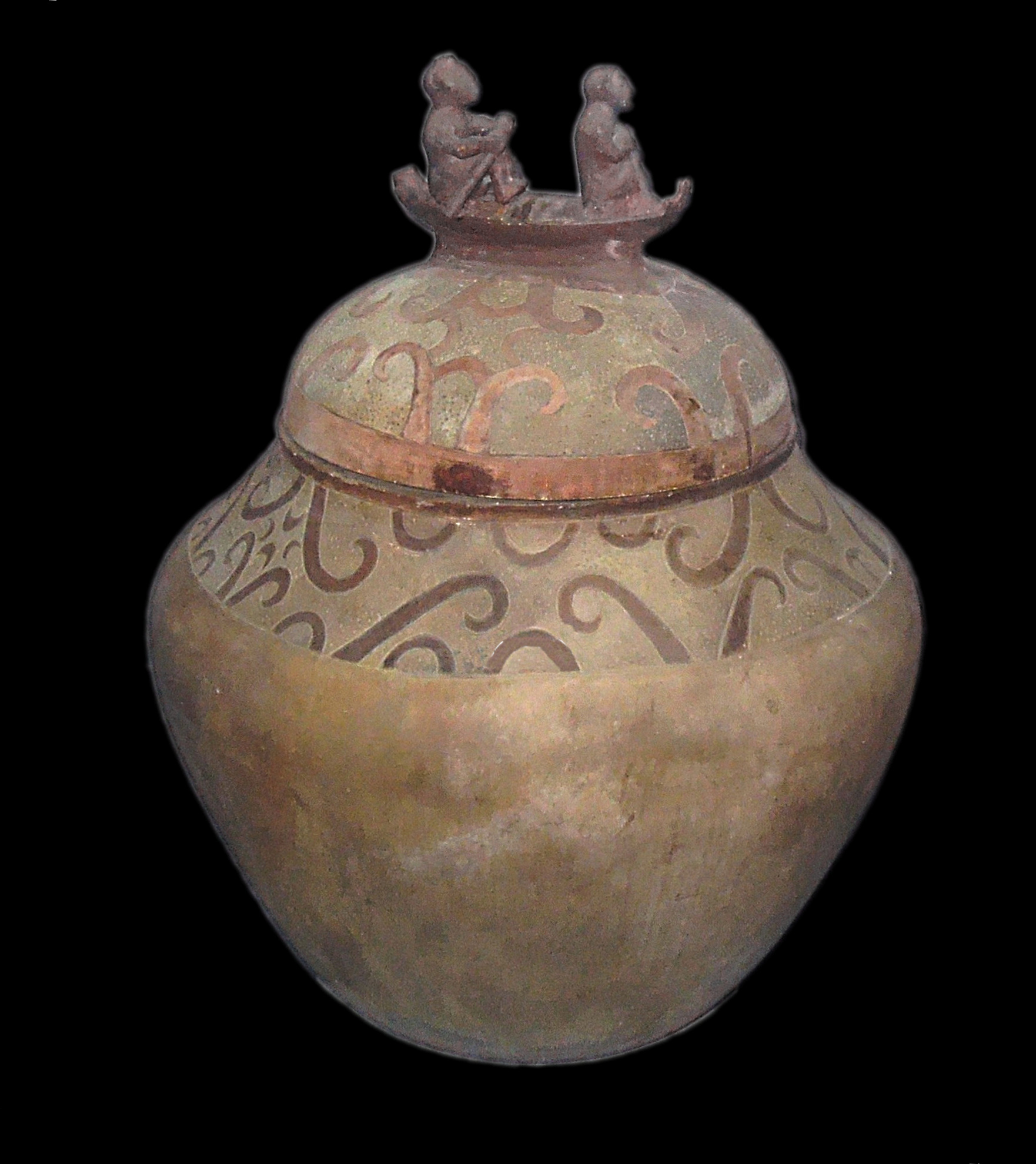
The Manunggul Jar (890–710 BCE) from Tabon Cave, Palawan, Philippines

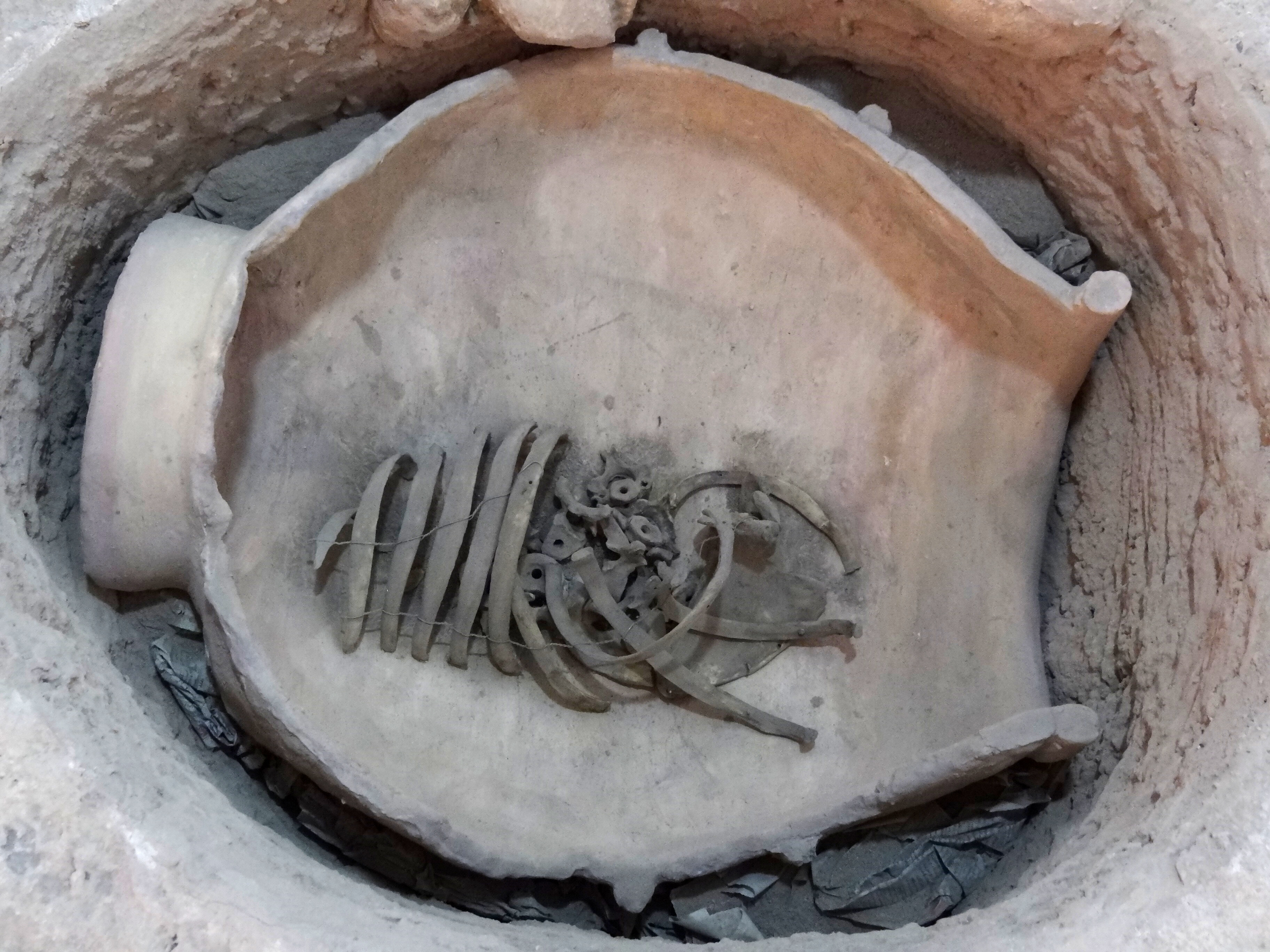
Infant burials in Iran, often placed under houses; a similar custom exists around Palestine

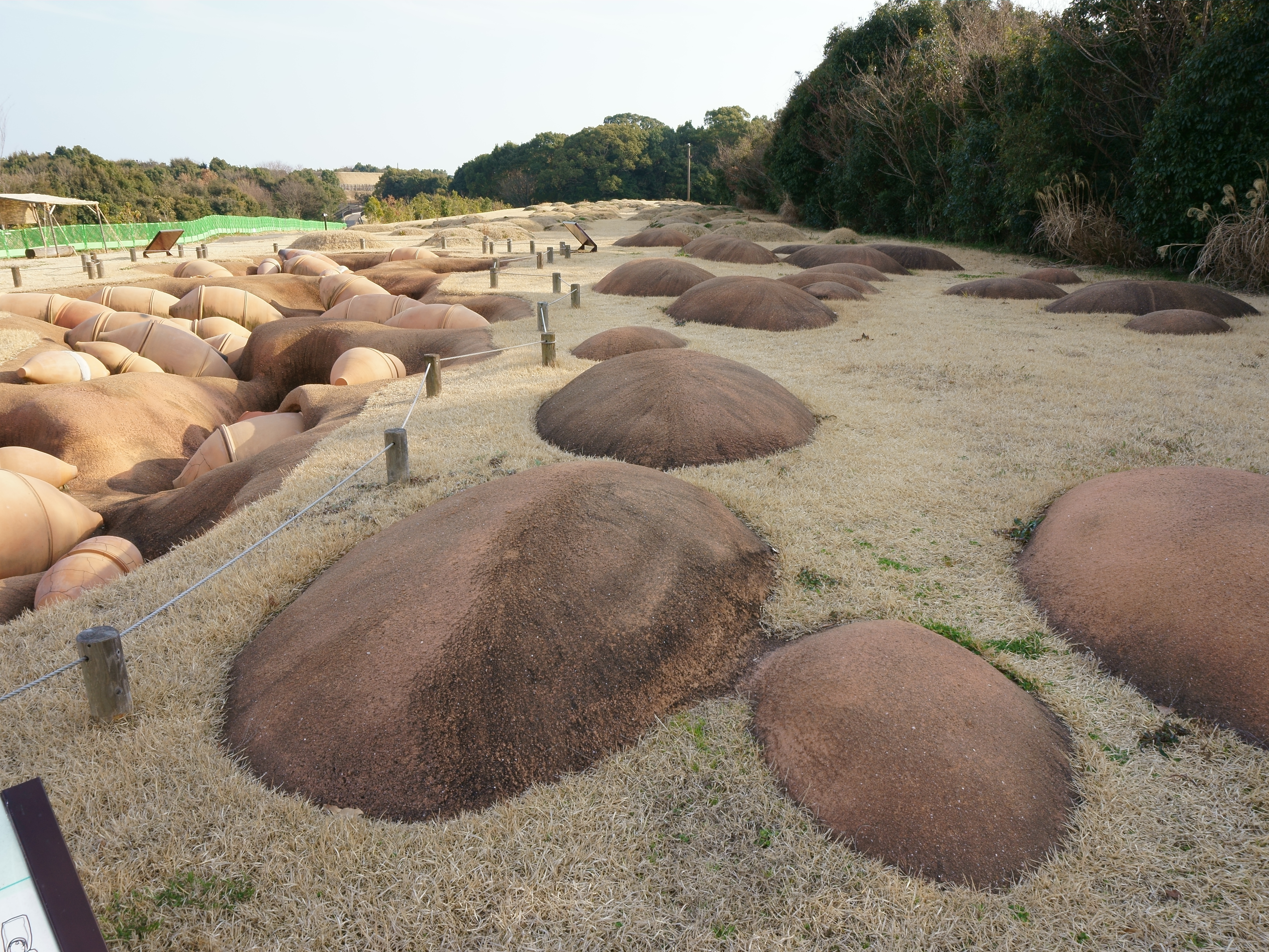
Japanese burial jar cemetery in Yoshinogari

== Geographical locations ==
Location	Dates	Cultural Specifics
Cambodia	1395 – 1650	In the Cardamom Mountains specifically, a mass burial site with over 152 individuals was discovered. Using radiocarbon dating, researchers were able to indicate that this specific site was only an active burial site for about 15 years. In addition to human remains, they were able to genetically identify animal bones (pigs, dogs). These findings were deduced to have been placed with the grave as offerings. The jars were identified as being obtained through maritime trade or local ceramic production.
Egypt	–	In Egypt, prior to using an embalming process, there is evidence of jar burial. They used hemispherical and bowl urns (the shape was not indicative of any external meaning). Some jars have inscriptions on the outside resembling common deities worshipped by the Egyptian people.
Indonesia	c. 1st – 2nd millennium CE	Jar burials have been found on Java, Sumatra, Bali, Sulawesi, Salayar Island, and Sumba. Most sites are found in eastern Indonesia, with the burials restricted to coastal areas.
Iran	–	In Iran, no items accompany the burials, and there are no indications of offerings. However, this area is dictated by tropical conditions which resulted in frequent and repeated flooding, resulting in sites and artifacts that were not well preserved.
Japan	300 BCE – 300 CE	Jar burial was practiced in Japan for about 600 years. Sites here show intricate planning of burial sites that reflects a social hierarchy within the site. Certain areas of the site had multiple burials clumped together, with the most recent burials closer to the surface, and the oldest lying deeper underneath. These clumps all faced each other, so when the site was opened again to bury someone new, all of the clumps were 'connected' and thus more inviting to the person about to be buried. Within clumps, most have offerings in or around the graves. The offerings and intricate site planning indicate significant care was put into the disposal of the dead.
Lebanon	–	Among the sites discovered in Lebanon, jar burials were particularly reserved for infants. It is rare to find an adult buried in a jar.
Malaysia	1150 – 300 BC	Burial jars have been found in the Niah Caves of Sarawak.
Palestine	–	Palestinian jar burials were done as "subfloor burials", meaning they were buried under the floor in rooms of the house. The areas chosen were mostly high-traffic areas where household tasks were performed, thus connecting them with the main parts of everyday life. Occasionally materials have been found with the bodies (such as shells), but there is no evidence that these were placed with the bodies as offerings. Late Islamic jar burials are known from rural Palestine, for example in Zarnūqa in central Palestine, where salvage excavations revealed an infant burial dated to the late Ottoman period (18th–19th centuries CE). The burial composed of two large imported Egyptian ballāṣ jars joined together around the remains of a newborn, with traces of grain or food offerings placed inside.This find suggests the persistence or revival of earlier burial traditions under specific local conditions.
Philippines	1581 BCE – 1460 ± 180 CE	The practice of jar burial was widespread in the Late Neolithic period of the Philippines, with archeological examples from northern Luzon, Marinduque, Masbate, Sorsogon, Palawan, and in Sarangani in Mindanao. Jars were usually made from clay or carved stone and placed in caves. The oldest dated jar fragments are from the Dalan Serkot Caves in Cagayan Valley, radiocarbon dated to around 1581 ± 34 BCE (1947–1753 cal. BCE). The most recent jar burial remains are from Banton Cave in Banton, Romblon island, and Balisong Cave in Pilar, Panay island. These have been dated to around the 13th to 17th centuries CE. The oldest intact example is the Manunggul Jar from the Tabon Cave, dated to 890–710 BCE.
Sumatra	700 – 1500 CE	Secondary burial was carried out using the jar burial method. The only other additions of note were shards of pottery found with the bodies in some urns.
Syria	1800 – 1750 BCE	Syrian jar burial was noted to have been practiced for a short period of time. The vessels used to bury individuals in did not always happen to be jars; they ranged from pots to goblets, and had pins and cylinder seals inside.
Taiwan	–	Typical to Austronesian Indigenous Taiwanese jar burial, glass beads were laid to rest within the jars along with the body. Jar burial was used as a means of secondary burial.
Thailand	c. last centuries BCE	Upon extensive testing, studies have shown that individuals buried in jars had different diets than other inhabitants of Thailand. This suggests a different social status of those buried in jars, or that those individuals were immigrants and brought that practice with them to Thailand.
Vanuatu	–	In Vanuatu, almost all jar burials were found with ceramic fragments in the jars. It is unclear whether those are shards of other broken jars or if they were placed in the jars as offerings.
Vietnam	–	Burial jars in Vietnam are mostly from Austronesian sites in southern and central Vietnam. The most notable are burial jars from the Sa Huỳnh culture.

== See also ==
- Canopic jar
- Plain of Jars
- Hanging coffins

== Sources ==
- Ivashchenko, M. (1947). Kuvshinnye pogrebeniia Azerbaidzhana i Gruzii. 1. Izvestiia AN Azerbaidzhanskoi SSR.
- Kaziev, S. M. (1960). AVbom kuvshinnykh pogrebenii. Baku.
- Golubkina, T. I. (1961). Kul'tura kuvshinnykh pogrebenii v Azerbaidzhane. Vol. 4. In the collection Tr. Muzeia istorii Azerbaidzhana. Baku.
- Noneshvili, A. I. (1992). Pogrebalʹnye obri︠a︡dy narodov Zakavkazʹi︠a︡ : kuvshinnye pogrebenii︠a︡ VIII v. do n.ė.-VIII v n.ė. [Funeral Practice of Transcaucasian Nations (The 8th B.C. – The 8th A.D. Jar Burials)] (in Russian). Tbilisi. ISBN 5520010285. OCLC 31412301.
