= Kurt Latte =

German classicist and philologist (1891–1964)

- Born: 9 March 1891; Königsberg, Kingdom of Prussia, German Empire
- Died: 18 June 1964 (aged 73); Tutzing, Bavaria, West Germany

Academic background
- Education: University of Königsberg
- Thesis: De saltationibus Graecorum capita quinque (1913)
- Doctoral advisor: Ludwig Deubner

Academic work
- Notable works: Hesychii Alexandrini Lexicon (1953–1966); Römische Religionsgeschichte (1960)

Kurt Latte (9 March 1891, Königsberg – 18 June 1964, Tutzing) was a German philologist and classical scholar known for his work on ancient Roman religion.

== Career ==
The son of a doctor, Latte studied at the University of Königsberg, the University of Bonn, and the Friedrich Wilhelm University of Berlin. After taking his doctorate at Königsberg in 1913 under Ludwig Deubner with a study on cultic dance in Ancient Greece, he began work on an edition of the dictionary of Hesychius of Alexandria. After service in World War I, he was Assistent at the Institut für Altertumskunde of the University of Münster from 1920 to 1923, obtaining his Habilitation there in 1920 with a study of Greek and Roman sacral law. In 1923, he was appointed professor at the University of Greifswald as successor to Johannes Mewaldts, in 1926 professor at the University of Basel as successor to Günther Jachmann, and in 1931 professor at the University of Göttingen, as successor to Eduard Fraenkel. He was forced to retire on 1 April 1936, having been classified as a Jew by the Nazis.

Having returned to Germany in 1937 from a visiting professorship at the University of Chicago, Latte lived out the period of Nazi rule in Hamburg (where he was supported by Bruno Snell), Düsseldorf, and Osterode am Harz, where he had been invited by his erstwhile Greifswald colleague Konrat Ziegler, who hid him for a time. In 1945, he was able to resume his chair at the University of Göttingen, but declined to endorse an appointment for Ziegler. In 1947, he was made a corresponding member of the German Academy of Sciences at Berlin. From 1949 to 1956, he was president and vice president of the Academy of Sciences at Göttingen, as well as chairman of the Mommsen-Gesellschaft. In 1951, he received an honorary doctorate from Heidelberg University. After his retirement in 1957, he moved to Tutzing and up until his death held seminars on Greek law at the Ludwig-Maximilians-Universität München.

== Scholarly work ==
His major work is Römische Religionsgeschichte (Munich, 1960), which was intended to replace the work of Georg Wissowa that by then was nearly 60 years old. Although widely cited, Latte's work has not escaped criticism. Latte attempted to be systematic and historical at the same time, melding Wissowa's Varro-based systematic description with the historical approach of Franz Altheim; the resulting structure can seem haphazard. In the opinion of Stefan Weinstock, Latte's understanding of linguistics was superior to that of Wissowa.

Latte rejected animism as having explanatory value for the study of Roman religion, but made some use of the concept of sympathetic magic, an approach criticized as inconsistent. His discussion of Roman priesthoods is considered "vital."

Latte viewed Roman religious traditions as in decline in the late Republic, and subject to political abuse. He felt, however, that the importance of Imperial cult had been exaggerated, and that "emperor worship" was a minor and perhaps not really a religious phenomenon at all. His is a counterweight to the predominant scholarly view that Imperial cult became increasingly central to Roman religion.

Latte's monumental edition of Hesychius of Alexandria was left unfinished at the time of his death (vol. 1 published in 1953, vol. 2 posthumously in 1966); the work was completed by Peter Allan Hansen and Ian C. Cunningham (vols. 3–4, 2005–2009).
