= Nestor's Cup (Pithekoussai) =

Eighth century BC wine cup

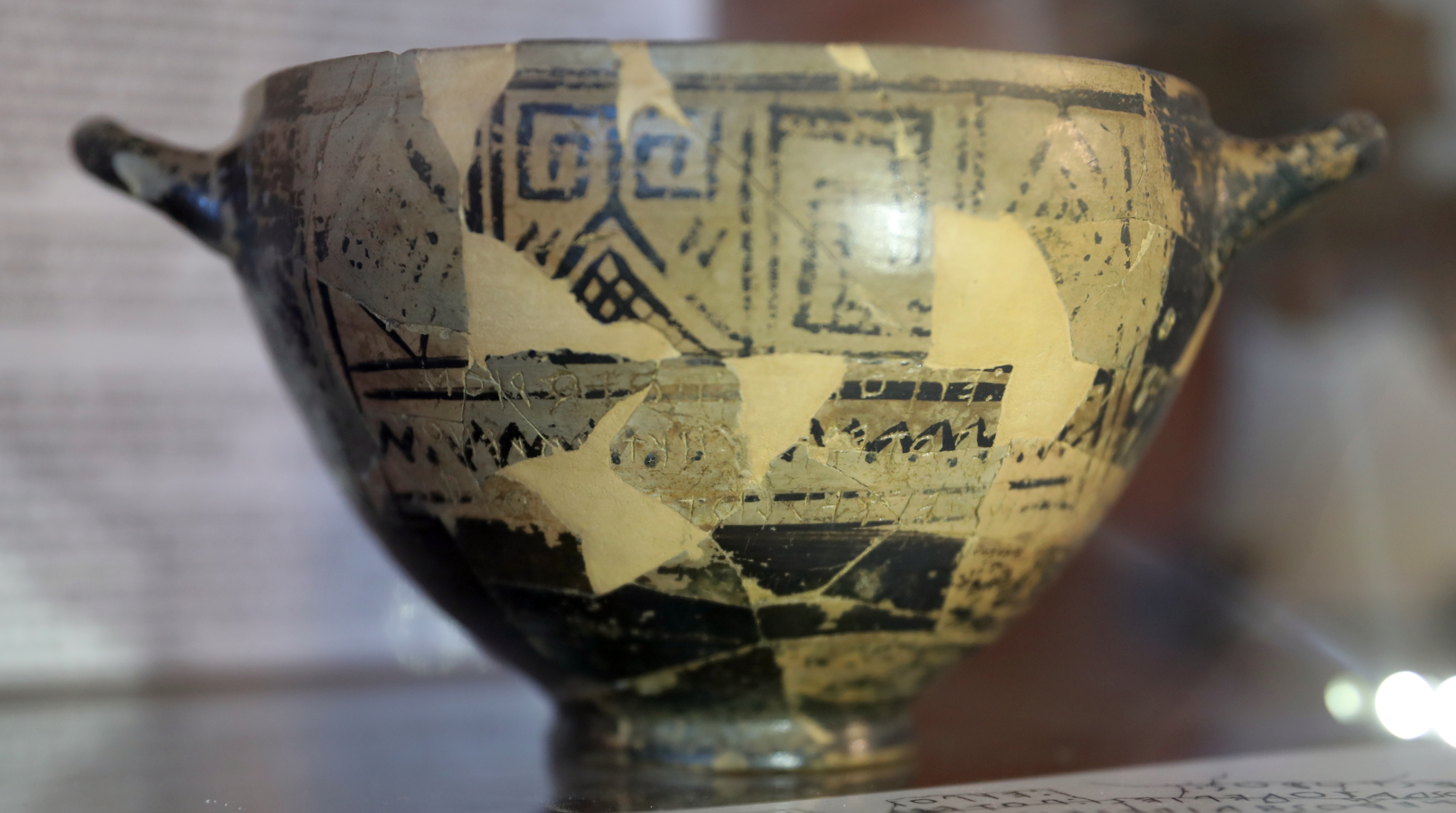
- Nestor's Cup
- Material: Ceramic
- Size: 10.3 cm (4.1 in) (height); 15.1 cm (5.9 in) (diameter)
- Writing: Ancient Greek (Euboean alphabet)
- Created: c. 735 – c. 720 BC
- Discovered: 1954; Tomb 168, San Martano cemetery, Ischia, Italy
- Discovered by: Giorgio Buchner
- Present location: Museo Archeologico di Pithecusae, Ischia
- Identification: 166788

Nestor's Cup is an eighth century BC wine cup discovered in 1954 in the San Montano cemetery associated with the ancient trading site of Pithekoussai in Magna Graecia, on Ischia, an island in the Gulf of Naples (Italy). The cup has a three-line inscription, one of the earliest surviving examples of writing in the Greek alphabet. It is currently held by the Museo Archeologico di Pithecusae on Ischia.

The cup was originally made in the eastern Aegean, either on the island of Rhodes or in northern Ionia. The inscription was scratched into it after its manufacture, possibly during a communal drinking event known as a symposium. It was found by Georgio Buchner in 1954 in a cremation grave dating to the end of the eighth century, which contained the remains of three adults as well as burnt animal bones, a fibula and fragments of other vessels.

The interpretation of the cup's inscription is controversial, particularly as concerns the reconstruction of a lacuna in its first line. At least fifteen possible reconstructions have been proposed, which variously associate and contrast the vessel with cup of Nestor described in the Iliad. The Pithekoussai cup has been taken as early evidence for the symposium in the Greek world.

== Cup ==
The cup is a skyphos or kotyle (Note: skyphos: Watkins 1976, Hansen 1988, West 1994, Gaunt 2017. kotyle: Johnston & Andriomenou 1989, Faraone 1996, Pavese 1996) decorated in the Geometric style, 10.3 cm (4.1 in) in height and with a diameter of 15.1 cm (5.9 in). It was made around or before approximately 735–720 BC, either on the island of Rhodes or in northern Ionia. It was found in 1954 in a cremation grave dating to approximately 720–710 BC on the island of Ischia, home of the Euboean Greek emporion (trading-site) of Pithekoussai.

The cup's decoration has been called "typical, conventional, and predictable" by Nathan Arrington. It consists of two panels, the uppermost of which is divided into four metopes decorated with diamonds, a stylised drawing of a sacred tree and meander hooks, a device common on Attic skyphoi of the Geometric period. The lower panel includes a zigzag decoration, but also blank spaces, one of which was used for the inscription.

The San Montano cemetery in which the cup was found has been described as sub-elite. (Note: Wecowski 2014, p. 127; Arrington 2021, p. 191 (for sub-elite).) Osteological analysis carried out on the bones in 2017 suggested that the cremated remains associated with Nestor's Cup, and the grave itself, were of a child aged around 10 to 14. However, a more recent analysis conducted by the bioarchaeologist Melania Gigante and her team suggests that the remains are actually of three adults of varying ages. Unlike previous studies, they also found evidence of burnt animal bones among the remains, including those of sheep or goats, possibly dogs, and birds. Along with the cup, the tomb contained fragments of 25 other vessels, some associated with wine-drinking, (Note: Four kraters, four other drinking cups, three oinochoai, a jar, and seventeen aryballoi and lekythoi.) (Note: Hansen 1976, p. 27; Arrington 2021, p. 187 (for their function)) as well as a silver fibula. The bodies were cremated on a pyre separate from the grave, and the grave goods were ritually broken and burnt on the same pyre.

The cup was excavated in 1954 by Giorgio Buchner, who gave the designation "Tomb 168" to the grave from which it originates. The vessel is currently displayed in the Museo Archeologico di Pithecusae in the Villa Arbusto on Ischia.

== Inscription ==
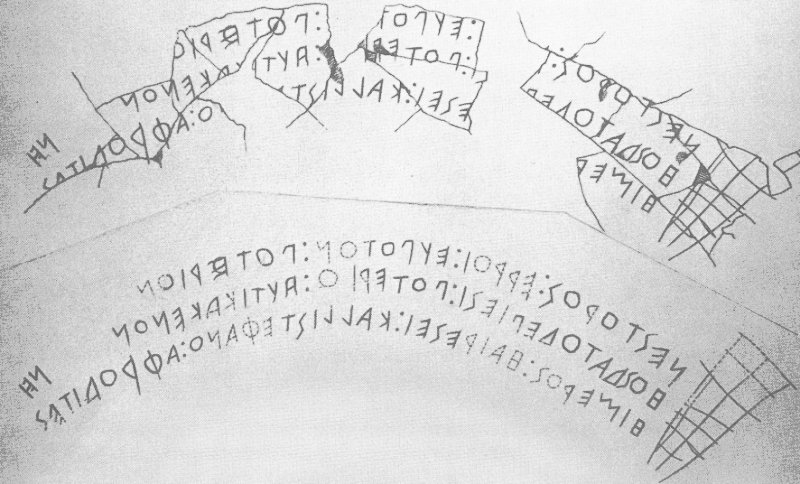
A drawing of the Nestor's Cup inscription, with a proposed restoration below. The restoration of the second word of the inscription as ΕΡΡΟΙ ('may it go away') was proposed by G. Buchner and C. F. Russo in the first publication of the inscription.

Another restoration. Here the second word is restored as ΕΜΙ, a variant spelling of εἰμί ('I am').

Νεστορος : ε[ιμ?]ι (Note: The restoration of the second word of the inscription is the main point of contention in the reading of the Nestor's Cup inscription. Jasper Gaunt considers ειμι ('I am') the most probable restoration, with Lilian Jeffery, Martin Litchfield West and Peter Allan Hansen among the proponents of the reading.) : ευποτ[ον] : ποτεριον :
ͱος δ'α<ν> τοδε π[ιε]σι : ποτερι[ο] : αυτικα κενον
ͱιμερ[ος ͱαιρ]εσει : καλλιστε[φα]νο : Αφροδιτες

—Jeffery 1963, p. 235 (Note: The Greek text is given written left-to-right, though the inscription on the cup is right-to-left.)
Translation:

I am the cup of Nestor good for drinking.
Whoever drinks from this cup, desire for beautifully
crowned Aphrodite will seize him instantly.

—Faraone 1996, p. 78

A three-line inscription, scratched onto the side of the cup, is one of the earliest extant Greek inscriptions. The inscription was added to the cup after its manufacture, and dates to the late eighth century. The inscription is in the Chalcidian variant of the Euboean form of the Greek alphabet, in small, neat letters. All three lines are written from right to left – according to Meiggs and Lewis, "virtually unique in a Greek text". The symbol ":" is used as punctuation. Arrington has suggested that the inscription may have been composed orally between multiple participants, each contributing a line, and then written onto the cup.

The second and third lines are in dactylic hexameter. The form of the first line is less certain: it has been read as prose, iambic trimeter, catalectic trochaic trimeter, or a lyric meter. The inscription subverts a common formula used for curses, promising a positive outcome where the second line foreshadows a negative one. Scholars disagree as to whether the "Nestor" of the inscription is the hero mentioned in the Iliad, and as to whether the poem would have been known in its present form by those writing or reading the inscription. If it does relate to the epic, the inscription also plays with the contrast between the small clay cup on which it was written and the legendary cup of Nestor described in the Iliad, (Note: Iliad 11.632–637) which was so large that ordinary people could not lift it.

The interpretation of the inscription depends on a lacuna in the first line: depending on how it is restored, the inscription may be contrasting the cup from Pithekoussai with that of Nestor, or identifying the cup as one owned by Nestor. The original publication of the inscription accepted the first possibility; by 1976, P. A. Hansen wrote that "no less than fifteen" possible restorations of the first lacuna had been published. By the 1990s, it was generally thought that the cup is in fact claiming to be Nestor's. The restoration proposed by Yves Gerhard in 2011 once again argues that the inscription is contrasting the Pithekoussan cup with that of Nestor. Apart from its first line, most details of the text are generally considered settled by scholars.

== Interpretation ==
The cup has been taken as evidence for communal wine-drinking among men, in a social ritual that became known as the symposium in the classical period. In 1994, Oswyn Murray called it the earliest definitive evidence of the ritual. Murray also suggested that the reference to Aphrodite, the Greek goddess of love, indicated that the participants in the cup's use would be reclining, a distinctive feature of sympotic drinking in later Greek culture.

== Works cited ==
- Arrington, Nathan T. (2021). Athens at the Margins: Pottery and People in the Early Mediterranean World. Princeton: Princeton University Press.
- Faraone, Christopher A. (1996). "Taking the 'Nestor's Cup Inscription' Seriously: Erotic Magic and Conditional Curses in the Earliest Inscribed Hexameters". Classical Antiquity. 15 (1): 77–112. doi:10.2307/25011032. JSTOR 25011032.
- Fogu, Claudio (2020). The Fishing Net and the Spider Web: Mediterranean Imaginaries and the Making of Italians. Cham: Palgrave Macmillan.
- Gaunt, Jasper (2017). "Nestor's Cup and its Reception". In Slater, Niall W. (ed.). Voice and Voices in Antiquity.
- Gerhard, Yves (2011). "La "Coupe de Nestor": Reconstitution du Vers 1". Zeitschrift für Papyrologie und Epigraphik (in French). 176.
- Gigante, Melania; Nava, Alessia; Paine, Robert R.; Fiore, Ivana; Alhaique, Francesca; Esposito, Carmen Mariarosaria; Sperduti, Alessandra; Bonetto, Jacopo; Cinquantaquattro, Teresa Elena; d'Agostino, Bruno; Bondioli, Luca (2021). "Who Was Buried with Nestor's Cup? Macroscopic and Microscopic Analyses of the Cremated Remains from Tomb 168 (Second Half of the 8th century BCE, Pithekoussai, Ischia Island, Italy)". PLOS ONE. 16 (10) e0257368. Bibcode:2021PLoSO..1657368G. doi:10.1371/journal.pone.0257368. PMC 8494320. PMID 34613997.
- Hansen, Ove (1988). "Nestor's Cup: A New Suggestion for Restoration of the Lacuna in Line 1". L'Antiquité Classique. 57: 280–281. doi:10.3406/antiq.1988.2244.
- Hansen, P. A. (1976). "Pithecusan Humour: The Interpretation of 'Nestor's Cup' Reconsidered". Glotta. 54 (1).
- Jeffery, L. H. (1963). The Local Scripts of Archaic Greece: A Study of the Origin of the Greek Alphabet and its Development from the Eighth to the Fifth Centuries B.C. Oxford: Oxford University Press.
- Johnston, A. W.; Andriomenou, A. K. (1989). "A Geometric Graffito from Eretria". Annual of the British School at Athens. 84: 217–220. doi:10.1017/S0068245400020955. S2CID 121035304.
- Meiggs, R.; Lewis, D. M. (1969). A Collection of Greek Historical Inscriptions to the End of the Fifth Century BC. Oxford.
- Page, Denys (1956). "Greek Verses from the Eighth Century BC". The Classical Review. 6 (2): 95–97. doi:10.1017/S0009840X00161165. S2CID 162116394.
- Papadopoulos, John K.; Smithson, Evelyn Lord (2018). The Early Iron Age: The Cemeteries. The Athenian Agora. Vol. 36. Princeton: American School of Classical Studies at Athens.
- Pavese, C. O. (1996). "La inscrizione sulla kotyle di Nestor da Pithekoussai". Zeitschrift für Papyrologie und Epigraphik (in Italian). 114.
- Valerio, Francesco (2017). "Coppa di Nestore". Axon (in Italian). 1 (1). doi:10.14277/2532-6848/Axon-1-1-17-1.
- Wachter, Rudolf (2001). Non-Attic Greek Vase Inscriptions. Oxford: Oxford University Press.
- Watkins, Calvert (1976). "Observations on the Nestor's Cup Inscription". Harvard Studies in Classical Philology. 80: 25–40. doi:10.2307/311231. JSTOR 311231.
- Wecowski, Marek (2014). The Rise of the Greek Aristocratic Banquet. Oxford: Oxford University Press.
- West, Stephanie (1994). "Nestor's Bewitching Cup". Zeitschrift für Papyrologie und Epigraphik. 101: 9–15. JSTOR 20189067.
