= Nestor's Cup (mythology) =

Legendary golden mixing cup owned by the hero Nestor

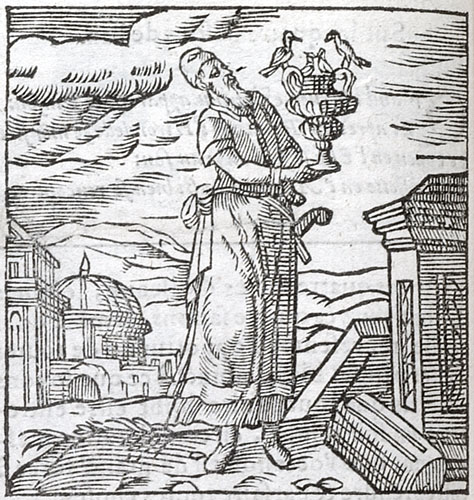
Nestor holding his cup; 16th century illustration

In Greek mythology, Nestor's Cup is a legendary golden mixing cup which was owned by the hero Nestor. The cup is described in the Iliad, and possibly appeared elsewhere in the Epic Cycle. Despite the brevity of its appearance in the Iliad, the cup was the subject of significant attention from ancient commentators on Homer.

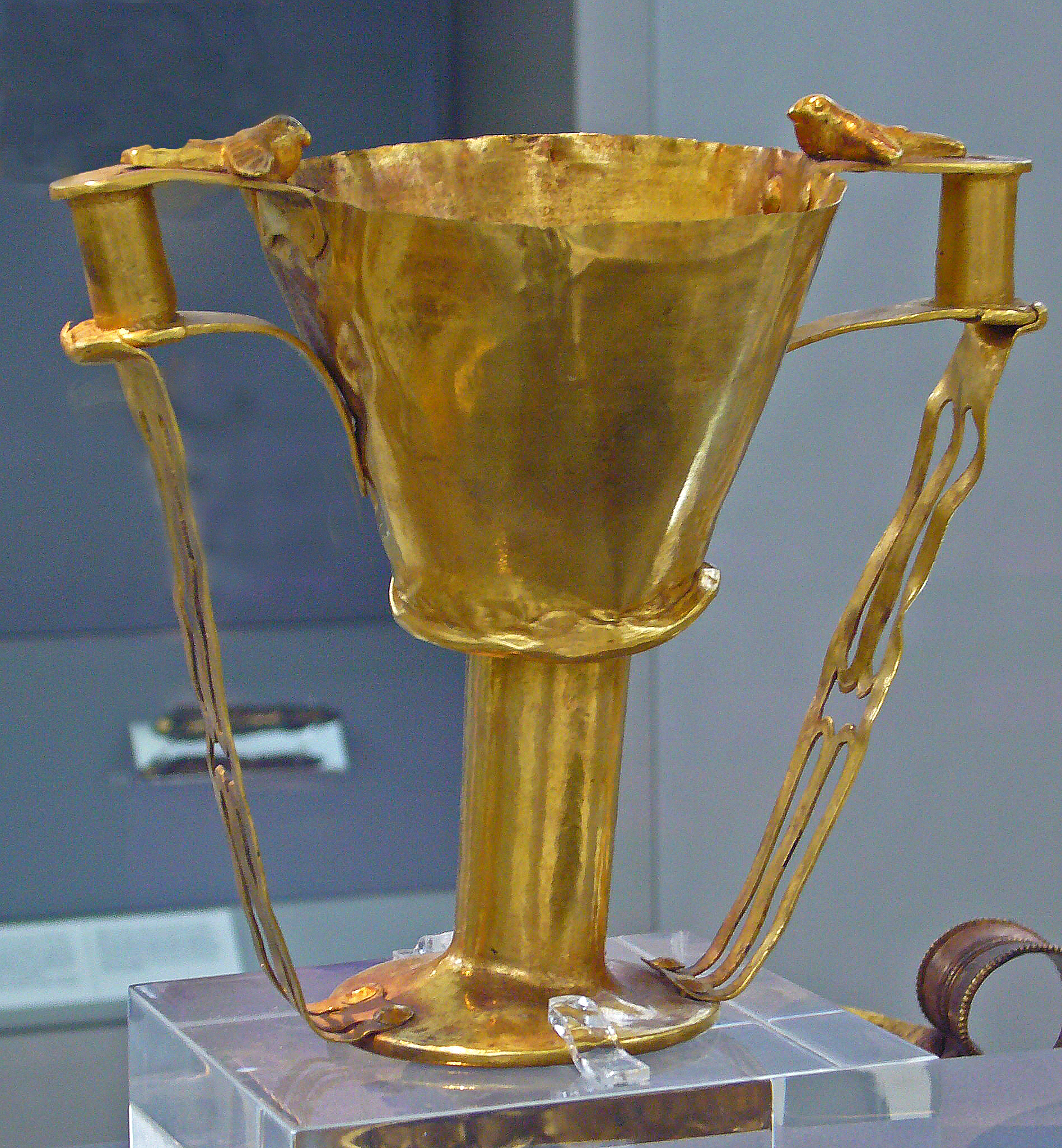
The so-called "Nestor's cup" from Mycenae, 16th century BC, National Archaeological Museum, Athens

It is not to be confused with the real gold cup excavated at Mycenae in 1876, which is commonly known as "Nestor's Cup" and has both similarities and differences with the literary object.

== Epic Cycle ==
Nestor's Cup is described in Book 11 of the Iliad. Machaon, son of Asclepius, is injured by Paris, and taken back to the Greek camp by Nestor; a healing drink is prepared for him in the cup. The cup is described over six lines.

πὰρ δὲ δέπας περικαλλές, ὃ οἴκοθεν ἦγ᾽ ὁ γεραιός,
χρυσείοις ἥλοισι πεπαρμένον: οὔατα δ᾽ αὐτοῦ
τέσσαρ᾽ ἔσαν, δοιαὶ δὲ πελειάδες ἀμφὶς ἕκαστον
χρύσειαι νεμέθοντο, δύω δ᾽ ὑπὸ πυθμένες ἦσαν.
ἄλλος μὲν μογέων ἀποκινήσασκε τραπέζης
πλεῖον ἐόν, Νέστωρ δ᾽ ὁ γέρων ἀμογητὶ ἄειρεν.
—Homer, Iliad 11.632-637

There was also a cup of rare workmanship which the old man had brought with him from home, studded with bosses of gold; it had four handles, on each of which there were two golden doves feeding, and it had two feet to stand on. Any one else would hardly have been able to lift it from the table when it was full, but Nestor could do so quite easily.

—Translated by Samuel Butler, 1898

Along with its description in the Iliad, the cup of Nestor may have appeared elsewhere in the Epic Cycle. Stephanie West argues that there was a pre-existing body of poetry which dealt with Nestor's heroic exploits in his youth, and which told of Nestor's cup. Peter Allan Hansen suggests that the cup may have appeared in the Cypria, perhaps in the episode known from a citation in Athenaeus where Nestor gives Menelaus counsel after the abduction of Helen. An eighth century BC inscription on a cup from Pithekoussai references the mythological cup of Nestor, but there is nothing in the inscription specific to its appearance in the Iliad; Steven Lowenstam suggests that the author of the inscription knew of Nestor's Cup from a different source.

== Reception ==
Despite its relatively brief description in the Iliad – a mere six lines, compared to some 130 describing the Shield of Achilles in Book 18 – the cup was the subject of a great deal of attention in antiquity.

Ancient critics writing on the Iliad were particularly interested in three aspects of Nestor's Cup: its size, why it was that only Nestor could lift it, and the doves on its handles. At least as early as the fifth century BC, scholars including Glaucon, Antisthenes, and Stesimbrotos addressed the question of why Nestor was the only one who could lift his cup; the problem continued to be addressed throughout antiquity at least up until the time of Porphyry, who included it in his Homeric Questions. The doves were discussed by Asclepiades of Myrlea, and caught the imagination of Martial, who mentions them in his description of Nestor's cup in poem 8.6.

According to Athenaeus, the grammarian Dionysius Thrax commissioned a silver replica of Nestor's cup.

== Works cited ==
- Gaunt, Jasper (2017). "Nestor's Cup and its Reception". In Slater, Niall W. (ed.). Voice and Voices in Antiquity. Brill. ISBN 9789004327306.
- Hansen, P. A. (1976). "Pithecusan Humour: The Interpretation of "Nestor's Cup" Reconsidered". Glotta. 54 (1).
- Lowenstam, Steven (1997). "Talking Vases: the Relationship between the Homeric Poems and Archaic Representations of Epic Myth". Transactions of the American Philological Association. 127.
- Mori, Anatole (2011). "Dionysios of Thrace (512)". In Worthington, Ian (ed.). Jacoby Online. Brill's New Jacoby, Part III. Leiden: Brill. doi:10.1163/1873-5363_bnj_a512.
- West, Stephanie (1994). "Nestor's Bewitching Cup". Zeitschrift für Papyrologie und Epigraphik.
