= Hesychius of Alexandria =

Greek philologist and lexicographer

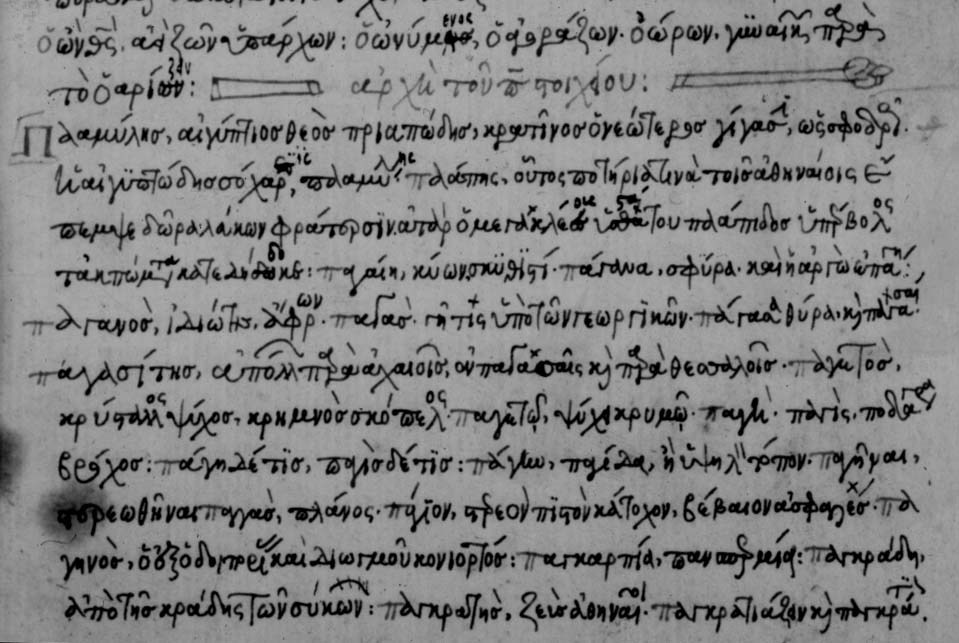
Beginning of letter π, detail of Marc. Gr. 622.

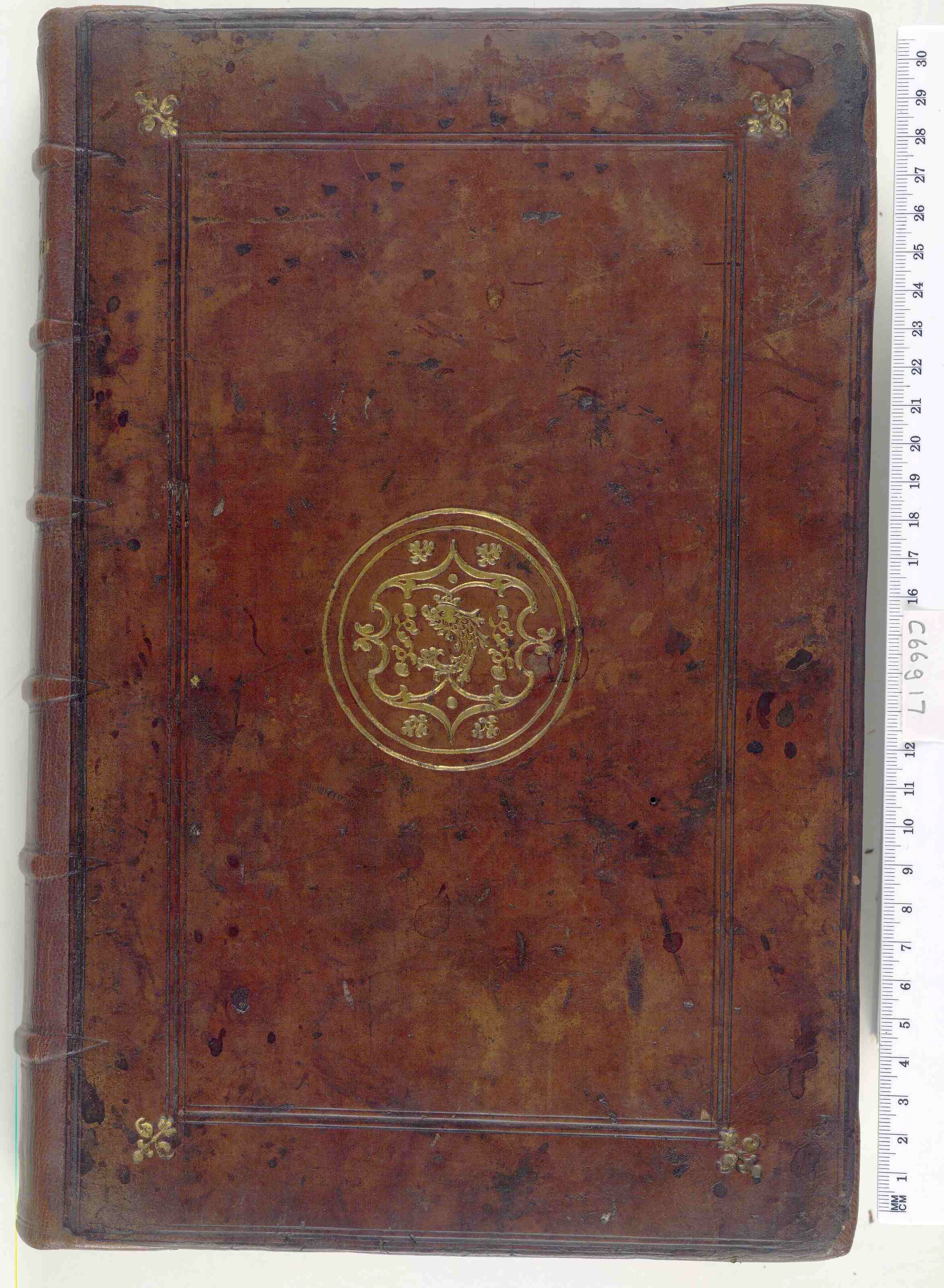
Hesychius' dictionary (Swiss edition, 16th century).

Hesychius of Alexandria (Ancient Greek: Ἡσύχιος ὁ Ἀλεξανδρεύς, romanized: Hēsýchios ho Alexandreús, lit. 'Hesychios the Alexandrian') was a Greek grammarian who, probably in the 5th or 6th century AD, compiled the richest lexicon of unusual and obscure Greek words that has survived, probably by absorbing the works of earlier lexicographers.

The work, titled "Alphabetical Collection of All Words" (Συναγωγὴ Πασῶν Λέξεων κατὰ Στοιχεῖον, Synagōgē Pasōn Lexeōn kata Stoicheion), includes more than 50,000 entries, a copious list of peculiar words, forms and phrases, with an explanation of their meaning, and often with a reference to the author who used them or to the district of Greece where they were current. Hence, the book is of great value to the student of the Ancient Greek dialects and in the restoration of the text of the classical authors generally – particularly of such writers as Aeschylus and Theocritus, who used many unusual words. Hesychius is important not only for Greek philology but also for studying lost languages and obscure dialects of the Balkans in antiquity (such as Albanoid and Thracian) and in reconstructing Proto-Indo-European. Many of the words that are included in this work are not found in surviving ancient Greek texts.

Hesychius' explanations of many epithets and phrases also reveal many important facts about the religion and social life of the ancients.

In a prefatory letter Hesychius mentions that his lexicon is based on that of Diogenianus (itself extracted from an earlier work by Pamphilus), but that he has also used similar works by the grammarian Aristarchus of Samothrace, Apion, Heliodorus, Amerias and others.

Hesychius was probably not a Christian. Explanations of words from Gregory Nazianzus and other Christian writers (glossae sacrae) are later interpolations.

The lexicon survives in one deeply corrupt 15th-century manuscript, which is preserved in the Library of Saint Mark at Venice (Marc. Gr. 622, 15th century). It was first printed in 1514 by Marcus Musurus (at the press of Aldus Manutius) in Venice (it was later reprinted in 1520 and 1521 with modest revisions). A modern edition has been published under the auspices of the Royal Danish Academy of Fine Arts in Copenhagen, begun by Kurt Latte (vol. 1 published in 1953, vol. 2 posthumously in 1966) and completed by Peter Allan Hansen and Ian C. Cunningham (vol. 3, 2005, vol. 4, 2009).

== See also ==
- Suda
- Etymologicum Magnum
- Etymologicum Genuinum
