= Cardamom Mountains jar burials =

Cambodian burial/archaeological site

The Cardamom Mountains jar burials are a collection of twelve mortuary sites dating back to the late and post-Angkor period (15th-17th century CE) located in the Eastern region of Cambodia's Cardamom Mountains. The first work to analyse and describe the Jar Burial sites, and the main publications reporting findings, was funded by a three year Marsden grant from the Royal Society of New Zealand awarded to Dr Nancy Beavan. In recent years, these sites have gained interest due to their unique wooden coffins and vast collections of large, ceramic jars that often hold multiple human skeletons. These remains encompass both adolescents and adults who are speculated to be from the highland populations that inhabited Cambodia's mountain range. Various types of grave goods have also been discovered inside and around these burial jars including glass beads, ceramics, and metal jewelry from maritime trade across South and Southeast Asia.

== Highland societal culture ==
The highland communities were societies dwelling within the mountainous forests of Cambodia. Generally, it is believed that highland people had different cultural practices that were separate from the lowland societies, which we can see throughout various sectors including mortuary practices. Unlike Hindu and Buddhist-practicing lowland peoples, the highland communities did not cremate their dead but rather defleshed them before placing them inside large storage containers. In contrast, Angkorian society practiced cremation typical of Buddhism and Hinduism, which was introduced to Cambodia during the rise of the Funan kingdom in the first century CE and later gave way to the Angkorian Empire (also known as Khmer Empire), which was founded during the ninth century CE.

Modern day highland societies still persist to this day in Cambodia and they have their own mortuary customs involving placing their dead in funerary towers, but there is no evidence that they practice jar burials.

Despite the practice of different religious cultures between the highland and lowland societies, the Cardamom mountain people were likely not reclusive and would have partaken in the growing international trade of Southeast Asia Grave goods associated with jar burial sites such as glass beads, pottery, and metal would have been acquired through business and possible interaction with large, lowland communities and possibly foreign peoples who were part of the trade between countries like India, Thailand, and China. Highland populations would have had access to valuable resources such as hardwood, resin, and native wild animals that could be traded for raw material and other goods.

== Notable sites ==
So far there have been twelve discovered jar burial sites, five of which that have radiocarbon dates placing them between the 15th-17th century CE. When exploring these sites, researchers usually look for identifying characteristics such as wooden coffins and large collections of jars that contain multiple human remains and colorful glass beads. These jar and coffin burials are usually situated on top of exposed, mountainous ledges, which is an unusual detail when contrasting other burial traditions in Cambodia's archeological past.

=== Phnom Pel ===
Phnom Pel contains a mixture of seven jar burials and 12 wooden coffin burials. Seven glass beads were found in one of the coffins, one of which was a mutiraja bead which is a valuable heirloom in Island Southeast Asia. Separate from the beads, multiple approaches were used for dating the artifacts found at this site. The first approach used carbon-14 dating to estimate how old the wooden coffins were and the age of the human remains found in the coffins and jars, such as bone and tooth enamel. The results from the wooden coffins show two groupings of ages which points to a possible error with the carbon-14 dating. Radiocarbon dating for the human remains was unsuccessful due to environmental damage done to the bones and teeth making it hard to obtain reliable dates.

The second main approach that was used for dating this site via the wooden coffins utilized the Bayesian approach, which helped create a more complete timeline of events. While the radiocarbon dating alone pointed to there being two distinct groupings of events, the results of the Bayesian approach using the carbon-14 dates from the wooden coffins, pointed to the coffins being produced by one group over a longer period of time. The results placed the time period of tree harvest beginning anywhere from 1385 to 1445 AD with 95% probability. The date range 1405-1435 is also likely but with a probability of 68%. This date range coincides with the decline of Angkor, which means these highland people were contemporary with Angkor, yet apart from it. The coffins were constructed for 55 to 215 years (95%). A tighter range with 68% likelihood was also given: 70 to 130 years. Tree harvesting ceased between 1480 and 1625 (95%), and likely between 1495 and 1540 (68%).

Shewan et al. used strontium isotope analysis to find out more about the people that used Phnom Pel and were laid to rest in the wooden coffins and jars since strontium levels in teeth and bone coincide with the strontium levels in the environment the individual grew up in. Shewan et al. collected strontium-87/strontium-86 isotope ratios from tooth enamel in both the coffins and jar burials, as well as samples from the wooden coffins themselves. They compared these samples to samples taken from animals and plants in the area around Phnom Pel and the greater Cardamom Mountains. The resulting data implied that the coffin burials and the jar burials came from two distinct groups. The jar interment strontium ratios were nearly identical to the ratios found in the environment around Phnom Pel. Conversely, the strontium ratios found from the teeth in the wooden coffins represent a wider vicinity. They align with the strontium ratios found where the trees for the wooden coffins were harvested, which was not in close proximity to Phnom Pel.

Although it is difficult to glean information about who these highland people were, their geographic distribution, and their different mortuary rituals from the strontium isotope ratios alone, Shewan et al. believe it is reasonable to conclude that the people interred in the coffins and jars grew up in different areas of the mountains and were separate groups. Additional support for this theory can be seen in the difference in mortuary rituals found at Phnom Pel. For example, the wooden coffin burials only ever had one person per burial, while the jar burials often had the bones of two or more individuals. Shewan et al. hypothesize that "these ritual sites [may] represent important central places dedicated solely to funerary processing and placement rather than habitation."

=== Phnom Khnang Peung ===
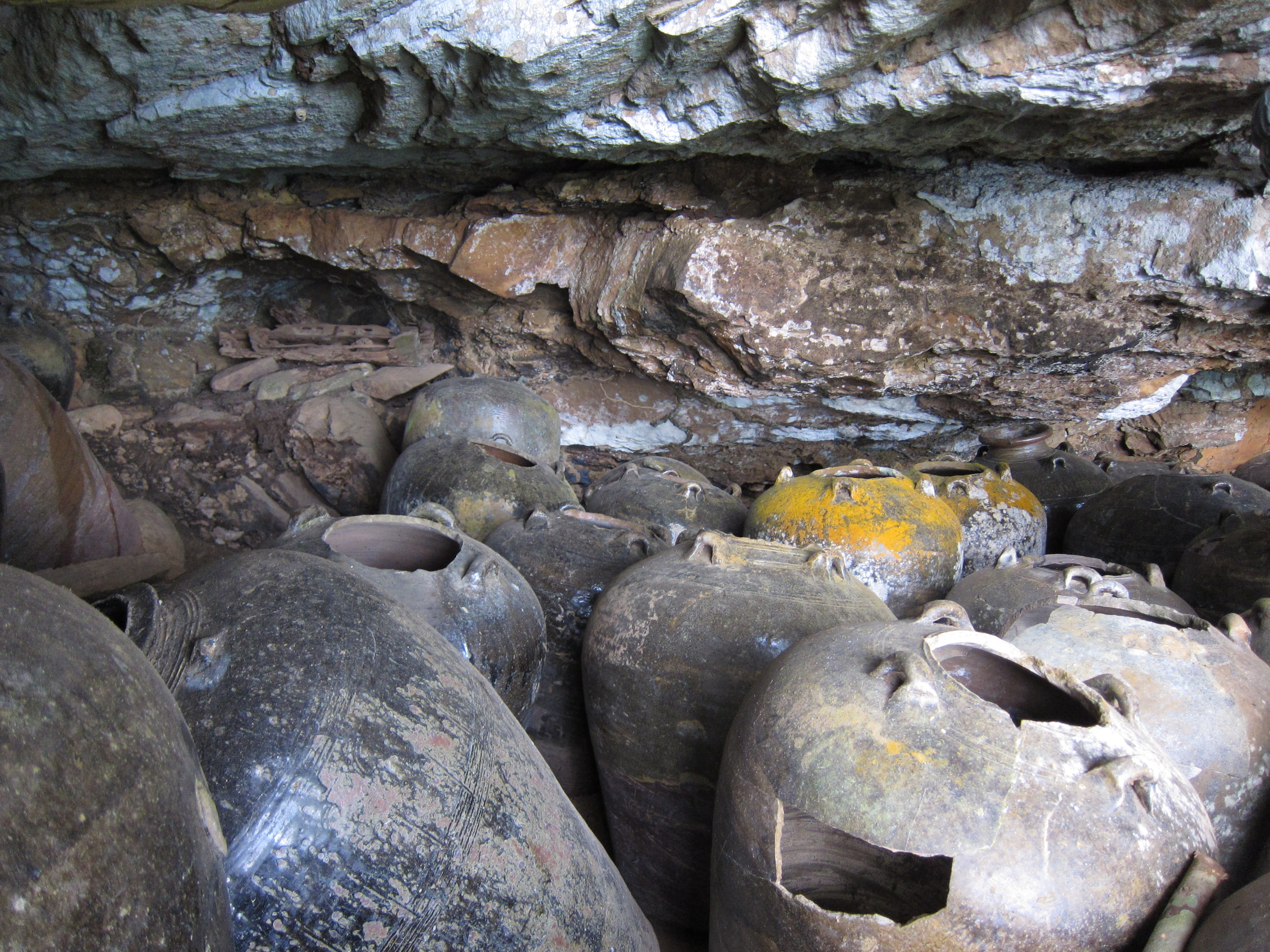
Collection of Cardamom Mountain jar burials.

Phnom Khnang Peung is the largest and most plentiful jar burials site in the Cardamom Mountains. It is extremely well preserved because the site is concealed within a cave that is hard to reach. This site has 40 jar burials on a long rock ledge, as well as five wooden coffins. It is estimated that the remains of up to 80 individuals could be in the jars at the site. Most of the jars were Maenam Noi jars, but there were Angkorian jars as well. Additional ceramics from Thailand were also found at the site.

There was a massive amount of beads found at this site. In 25 out of the 40 burial jars found, 1,332 glass beads were found. In the area surrounding the jars, 82 glass beads were also found. There were three types of beads found by Carter et al. at Phnom Khnang Peung. Well over a third of the beads found belonged to the "high-alumina mineral soda glass Type 2" beads category (42%). Roughly a third of the beads found were "lead-potash Chinese coil beads (34%)," and the rest were "newly discovered high-alumina glass beads (21%)." For more information on these beads, see "Common grave goods."

=== Khnorng Sroal ===
Khnorng Sroal is found on the side of a lightly wooded hill and it consists of a rock ledge that point south. Beavan et al. explored this site and found well preserved bones from multiple skeletons in three Maenam Noi jars. The bones found were one rib and two skulls. They also found a couple Maenam Noi jar bases, as well as other types of broken pottery. Using the bones they found in the jars, Beavan et al. used isotope-ratio mass spectrometry and radiocarbon dating to estimate the age of the bones, and thus the site. The results placed Khnorng Sroal in use from approximately 1430 to 1650 AD. This date range is supported by the grave goods found with the remains that were dated to the 1300s to 1500s. Beavan et al. were able to glean additional information about the people that once used the site. Nitrogen-15 and sulfur-34 isotope analyses were used to conclude that the people that inhabited this site ate mainly inland food.

=== Damnak Samdech ===
Damnak Samdech is a small, lightly researched site in a densely wooded region of the Cardamom Mountains. There are only four wooden coffins at this site, and the only jars found were not used for burials. There were also some other traded ceramics found here. Research at this site is made difficult by the small number of burials, as well as how degraded the wooden coffins are. The coffins have faced weathering and termites which has made the preservation of human remains difficult. Carbon-14 dating was done on a molar from a mandible in one of the coffins and the resulting age range of 1400-1600 AD is in line with the other sites.

=== Khnang Tathan ===
Khnang Tathan is an under-researched site that consists of one coffin burial which resides under a rock overhang rather than on a ledge. There were many skeletal fragments within the singular coffin, but no teeth were found. Beavan et al. notes that the coffin lid has a chevron pattern carved into both ends. Using carbon-14 dating, they were able to date the coffin to about 1430-1500 AD, which is contemporary with the other Cardamom Mountain burial sites. Besides the coffin, no other objects of significance, such as ceramics or beads, were found.

=== Okei ===
Okei is one of the Cardamom Mountain's smaller burial sites, but it is home to 298 glass beads. Most of the beads at this site were deemed to be part of the "newly discovered high-alumina glass beads." Additionally, several jars from the Maenam Noi kilns and one jar from Angkorian kilns were found on the two ledges at Okei. No human remains were found here.

== Jar burial contents ==
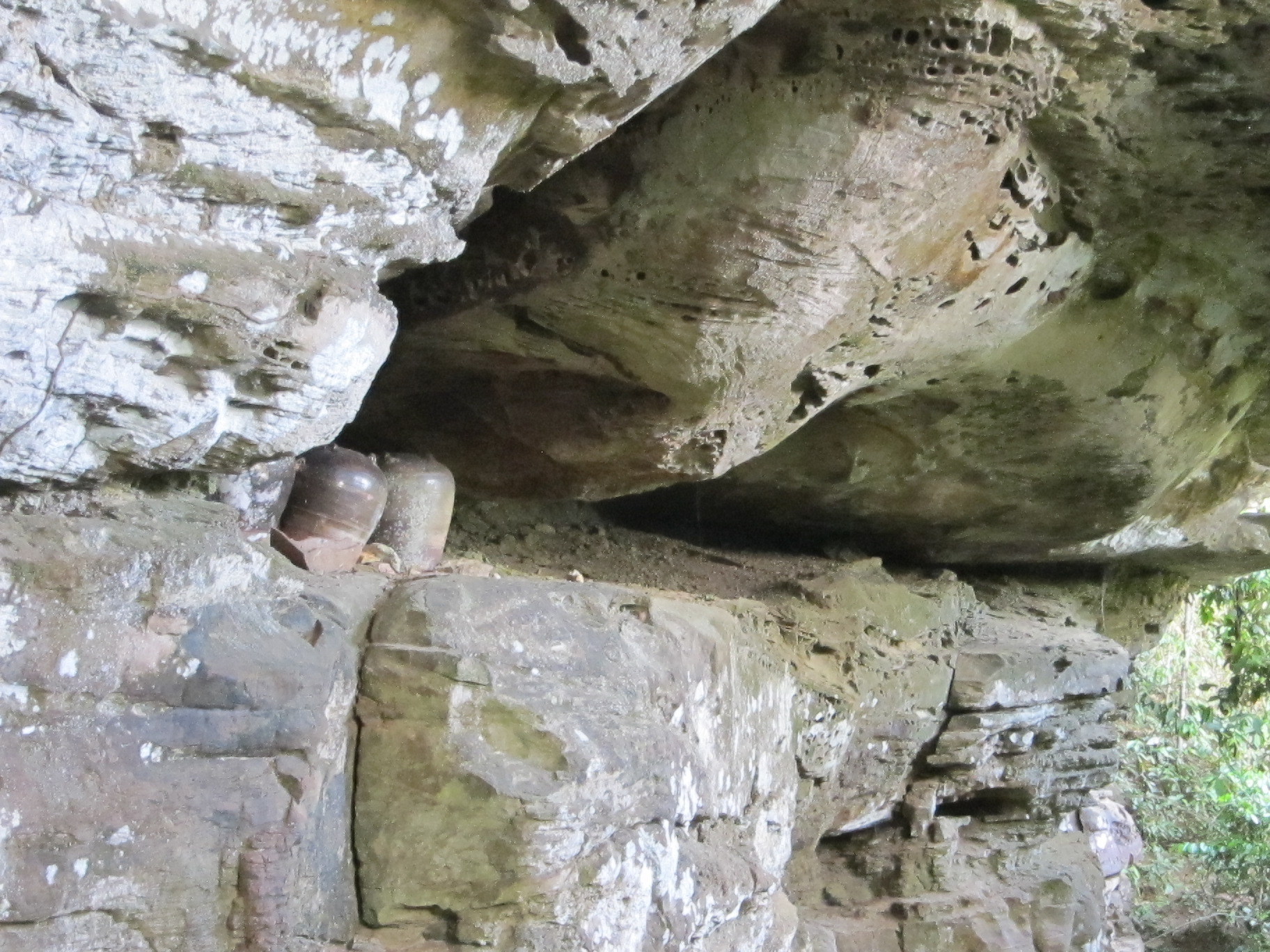
Ceramic mortuary jars situated atop a ledge in Cambodia's Cardamom Mountains.

Although uncommon in Cambodia's history, there have been other documented cases of jar burial practices outside of the Cardamom Mountain such as the lowland Prohear site (500-100 BCE) and the Srah Srang site (11th century CE). Unlike Prohear and Cardamom Mountain jar burials, which contained skeletal remains, the jars at Srah Srang were buried and contained cremated remains. One of the characteristic features that make the Cardamom Mountain sites stand out is that the jars are often found situated on exposed rock ledges.

=== Human remains ===
From the Cardamom Mountain sites that have undergone archeological excavation, hundreds of human remains have been discovered within the coffins and large collection of storage jars atop rock ledges and are reminiscent of Cambodia's highland culture. From the largest site, Phnom Khnang Peung, 44 jars were recovered and examined, many of which contained more than one individual. These remains are believed to belong to native highland populations who inhabited Cambodia's Cardamom Mountain range and from bone samples extracted for radiocarbon dating, they are believed to have lived between the 14th and 16th century CE. The bones also show evidence of scurvy, which may indicate the first evidence of the disease in Southeast Asia.

Child remains found in one of the jars at Phnom Khnang Peung was examined, revealing postmortem termite damage. The remains belonged to an individual around the age of six and consisted of the skull but lacked any post-cranial bones. From the skull, scientists noticed abnormalities such as the porosity of the bone that probably affected this individual during life. Porosity can be an indicator of many different medical conditions, the most probable being leukemia, rickets, anemia, or scurvy. Vascular impressions found within the bones of the skull is an indicator of a vitamin C deficiency, which can result in scurvy.

=== Common grave goods ===
One of the most abundant grave goods found inside the jar burials alongside the remains were colorful glass beads. These beads are made up of different material composition based on their color. According to current knowledge, they are not native to the Cardamom Mountain region but rather are evident of maritime trade between Cambodia and other South and Southeast Asian countries.

The Phnom Khnang Peung site revealed an assortment of metal jewelry and glass beads believed to have come from China, and glazed pottery from Thailand. The wooden coffins and ceramic vessels that hold the remains also displayed different styles and are reminiscent of Maenam Noi production technology found in Thailand while others reflected production associated with Cambodia's Angkorian kilns.

From Chinese documents dating as far back as the 14th century, there is written evidence describing the bead trade between China and Cambodia in which Cambodia's hill tribe people exchanged forest products with seafaring Chinese merchants for items such as metal, ceramics, and glass beads. With the thousands of glass beads recovered from the Cardamom Mountain burials, it is speculated that there were relations built from trade between highland and lowland societies within Cambodia that fed into much broader exchange networks between countries. Waterways like the Mekong River system were important for trade within inland regions that did not have direct access to the Indian Ocean.

Almost 1,500 glass beads were recovered from the Phnom Khnang Peung site with the majority found inside the jars with the rest being recovered from the surrounding sediment. The Okei jar burial site, although smaller, also yielded a few hundred glass beads that were similar in nature. From a manufactured standpoint, these beads can be divided into coiled glass beads and drawn glass beads. The coiled beads are composed of a single color, typically light blue or white but can also be purple or orange, and are usually associated with historical Chinese bead-making practices. The drawn beads, known as Indo-Pacific beads, are recognized by their more tube-like shape and visible striations. They are also of a single color with the most common being black and yellow but it is not uncommon to find them in blues, greens, and purples as well. Given their stylistic variety, the glass beads were likely acquired through trade with other Asian countries such as India and China. The purpose for these beads is still uncertain, there have been speculation that they may be symbolic of wealth, hold ritualistic value, or be heirlooms passed down generations such is observed within other Southeast Asian societies.

== Ongoing archeological efforts ==
Since 2015, Khmer archaeologists from the Cambodian government's Ministry of Culture and Fine Arts (MoCFA) continue to work to identify additional Cardamom Mt. jar burial sites and to piece together the cultural significance of these unique mortuary practices and the people that utilised these sites. The publications on skeletal and grave goods analyses represent the first extensive scientific assessment of these burial sites, but many of the results are still open for interpretation until further information can be extracted. As with many Southeast Asian archeological sites that lack written text or have been understudied, there exist many gaps in current knowledge and further work is necessary to reconstruct the past.
