= Secondary burial =

Feature of certain prehistoric grave sites

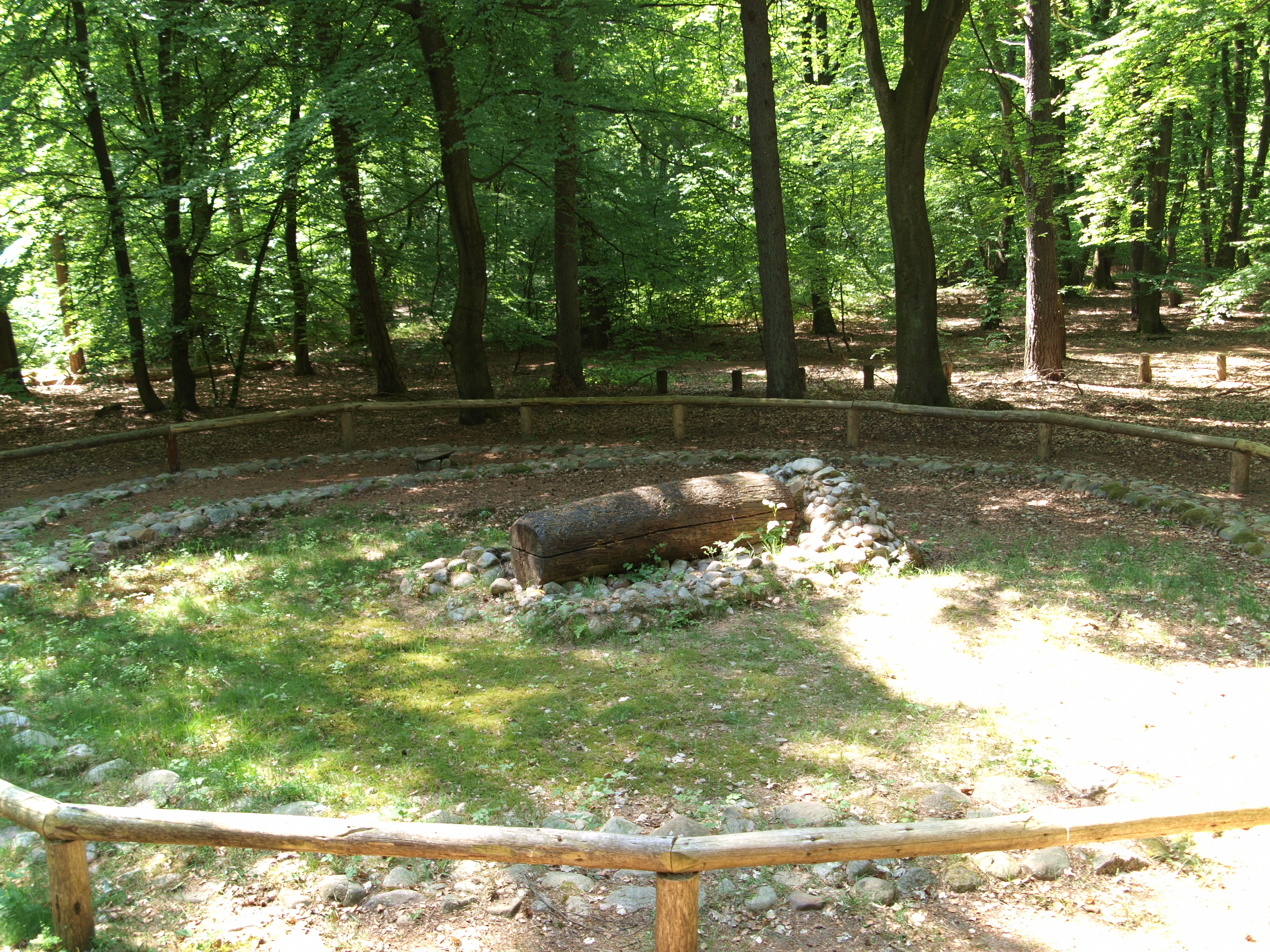
Partially reconstructed tree trunk burial – without burial mound – with a secondary burial in a semi-circular extension (background: centre left)

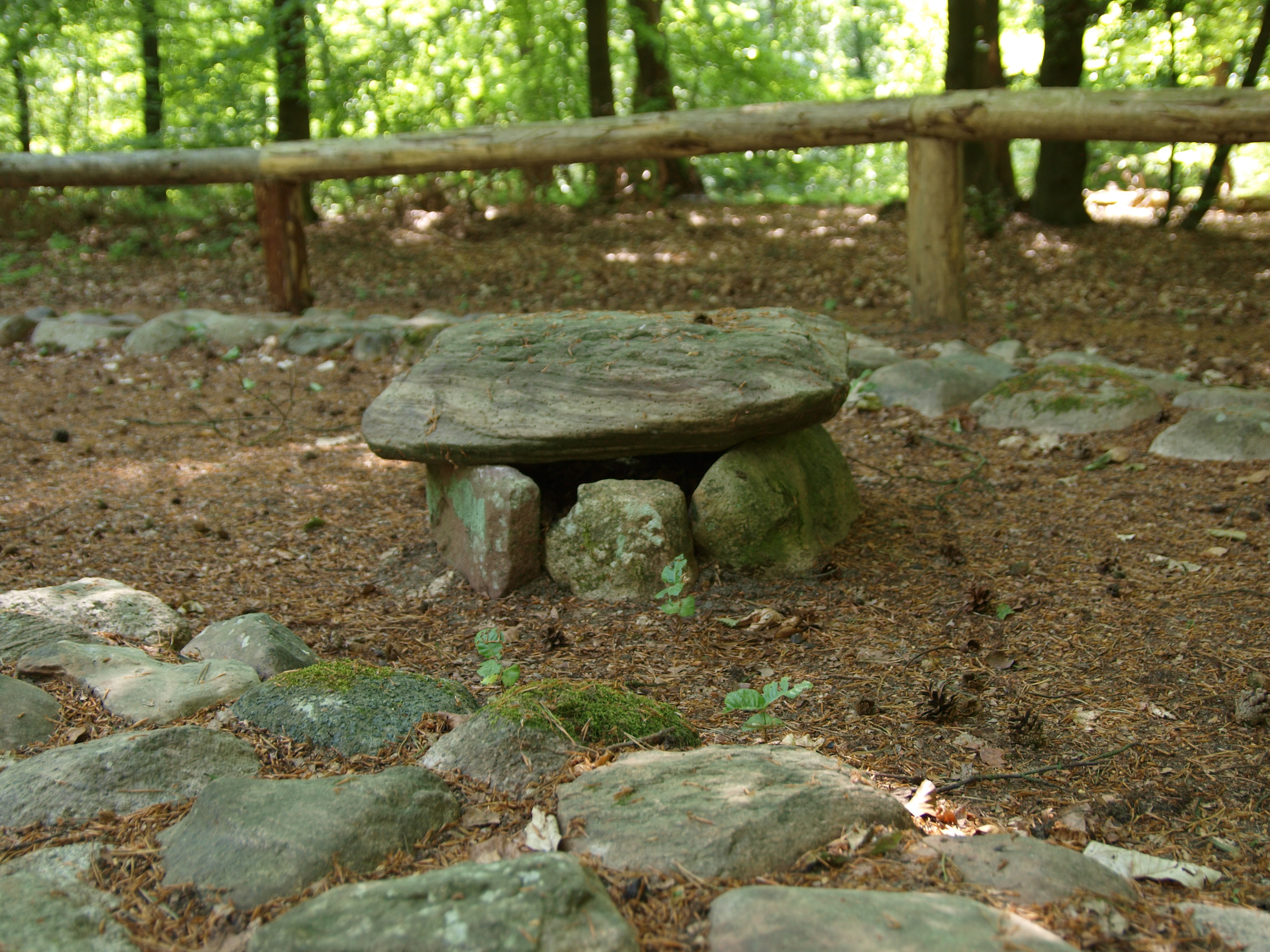
Detail of the secondary burial. In the foreground is the stone arrangement of the old burial mound. In the background is that of the more recent extension

The secondary burial (German: Nachbestattung or Sekundärbestattung), or “double funeral” (not to be confused with double burial in which two bodies are interred together) is a feature of prehistoric and historic gravesites. The term refers to remains that represent an exhumation and reburial, whether intentional or accidental.

Examples of secondary burial are known from the Paleolithic period, (including the Middle Paleolithic Mousterian culture and the Upper Paleolithic Magdalenian culture) and continuing through the Mesolithic period into the Neolithic period. The mortuary practice is evident into the Iron Age, Medieval Europe, and into modern times. It has been a funerary tradition for cultures throughout the world. It was used by hunter-gatherer bands to large-scale, stratified states. Secondary burial was used by Neanderthals and by anatomically modern Homo sapiens. Secondary burial is a frequent feature of megalithic tombs and tumuli. Secondary burials were also a mortuary custom among many Native American cultures, and peoples of the Philippines.

== Overview ==
From an archaeological and ethnographic perspective, the burials of the dead are divided into two categories: primary burials and secondary burials. Primary burials refer to the initial burial, with temporary or final severance of all physical contact of family and community members with the deceased. Secondary burial may occur after a primary funeral ceremony, during which there is additional manipulation of the human remains. This may include a second funeral ceremony, sometimes considered to alter the spiritual condition of the deceased.

== Description ==
Secondary burial is evident in the archaeological record and has been documented ethnographically. There are many different treatments, processes, and identifiers of secondary burial, and how it differs from primary burial. They can be similar in some ways. There are also many different reasons why individuals will perform the secondary burial. Some processes require the body to be prepared in a specific way before final or first inhumation. Others occur later. For examples, in the mortuary practices of the Neolithic Anatolian site of Çatalhöyük, secondary reburial of the skull of one individual with another occurred. This culture, like that of the earlier Pre-Pottery Neolithic B culture of the Levant, also practiced the making of plastered human skulls. In this case, the body received primary burial while the skull subsequently received secondary burial.

=== Identification ===
Archaeologists define a grave containing a primary burial as a positive process, adding up certain characteristics in to identify a primary burial. Archaeologists identify a secondary burial works as a negative process, characterized by the absence of certain elements. If there is a full skeleton that is complete and with elements in correct anatomical positions, it is probably a primary burial. Some cultures deflesh an individual after death, a process known as excarnation, which can take the place of a primary burial. They then collect all of the cleaned bones and bury them in a grave or tomb as a “complete” and “anatomical” skeleton (even if some bones are missing). Due to lack of preservation, some small bones, such as the phalanges, vertebrae, or ribs may be missing. Therefore, the absence of small bones may not indicate secondary burial. Issues of site taphonomy or circumstances of death may contribute to incomplete skeletons. This damage may either be caused by natural processes (earthquake, flood, weathering, and erosion), animals (usually rodents but also snakes) may have burrowed and destroyed, or stolen and moved bones, or through human actions unrelated to the burial or funerary tradition (construction, grave robbing, farming).

When there is a fully articulated skeleton, an archaeologist can look at the surrounding soil, under and around the remains, otherwise called the matrix, in order to identify the presence of organic material in the soil signifying the in situ decomposition of the flesh. Depending on burial conditions and time, there may be some joint tissue that can be evidence of primary burial. Identification can be a challenge because, even if something is missing or does not look correct, it is not always evidence for or against either primary or secondary burial.

=== Processes ===
There are many processes and traditions by which a culture may perform a secondary burial. They may cremate the individual and even perform secondary cremation. They may bury the individual first, and then later exhume a specific portion, like the secondary skull burial at Çatalhöyük, or the deliberate disturbance of graves at the Zvejnieki burial ground.

If cleaning the skeleton the members of the family, corporate body, or community may take the body to a location outside and leave the body to have it decompose and be cleaned by bacteria, insects, and scavenging animals, the latter of which may leave tooth and claw marks. It is important to identify marks that happened after death yet before burial. The body may also be cleaned by other humans with blades. that leave cut marks on the bones. Instances of defleshing with blades have been interpreted as signs of cannibals when bones were cut or cleaned in a deliberate manner.

=== Secondary burial architecture and structures/features ===
Artificial mounds and other, clearly visible, above-ground structures have been re-used since the New Stone Age (and even in later times, often by much later cultures) for burials of bodies, bones or cremated remains (in urns). These more recent burials, of whatever form, are referred to by archaeologists as secondary burials. They are found in grave mounds, usually in those areas of the site that could at the same time be extended. In larger dolmens, passage graves, stone cists, etc. the re-use of the interior space available was usually closer in time to the original burial (e.g. by the Globular Amphora culture), if necessary also accompanied by the removal or addition of secondary chambers (as in the Megalithic tombs of Hagestad). The mounds of the megalithic tombs, which were usually covered with earth, were re-used following a similar shape as the original grave mound.

Secondary burial in the Holy Land involved an initial interment in a tomb, for example, prone on a bench, until the body decayed. Subsequently, the decayed remains would be relegated to a nearby receptacle within the same tomb. Later, another person, typically a later member of the same family, would be placed on the same bench, and the process would continue. This practice is described in the article on Ketef Hinnom.

This practice of secondary burial should be distinguished from the continual use of natural caves, even when this falls during the same historical period, because they did not involve artificially constructed monuments.

== Insights and analysis ==
Much of the recordings of burial ceremonies were from the observations of explorers, missionaries, and administrative personnel who lived amongst native peoples. In the late 19th and early 20th century. Three important figures in analyzing these accounts were Hertz, Schärer, and Stöher. These scholars characterized the secondary burials of the Ngadju-Daya communities. These communities were part of the Dayak culture in Indonesia, and had a very structured approach to secondary burial ceremonies. These highly structured ceremonies helped the community feel as though they had some semblance of control over death. The translation and interpretation of Hertz’ thesis was seminal in the field, and is still used as a basis for understanding and interpreting current cultural practices of secondary burial. The overarching theme for Hertz was that in the Ngadju-Daya communities there was a moral obligation from both the family and community to benefit the deceased in the afterlife. In addition to providing for the deceased, this ceremony emphasized the greater good of the community over individualism. However, neither Hertz, Schärer, or Stöher lived amongst these native people, leaving room for misinterpretation and bias.

Secondary burials are also seen in many cultures over the centuries outside of the Ngadju-Daya. The unique characteristics and frequency of secondary burials are often used to help identify and characterize past settlements. These traditions have left a strong impression on people's minds today, and hence have affected how we view past cultures in general. Some more well-known examples include the megaliths from the late Funnel Beaker culture, the stringent procedures in the single burial graves of the Battle Axe culture, and the uniqueness of the Pitted Ware Culture. Some cultures even contain the remains of multiple individuals being subjected to fire, but defleshing as well.

== See also ==
- Rock-cut tombs in ancient Israel
