= Nestor's Cup (Mycenae) =

Gold goblet discovered in 1876 by Heinrich Schliemann

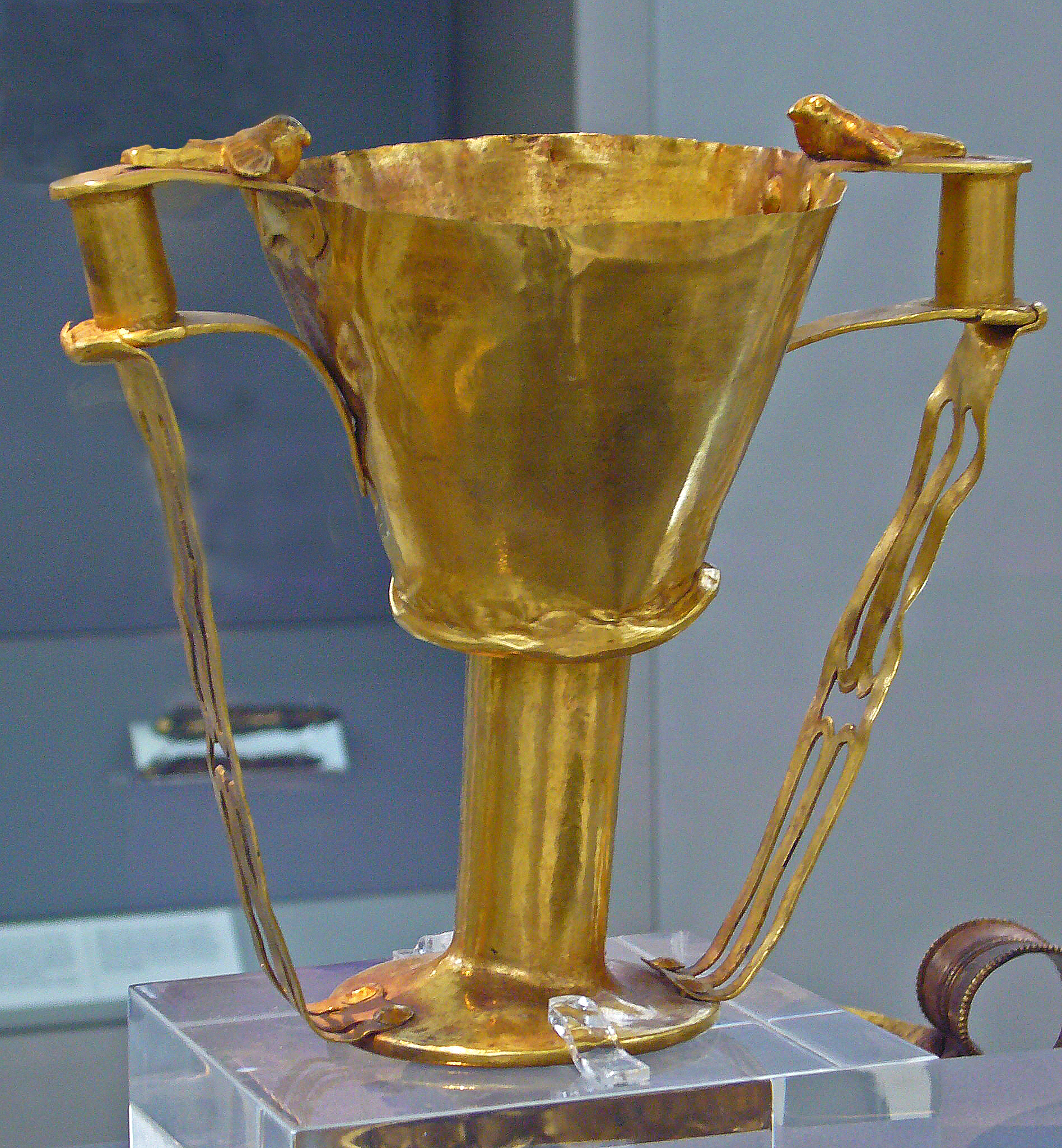
"Nestor's cup" from Mycenae

The Cup of Nestor or dove cup is a gold goblet discovered in 1876 by Heinrich Schliemann in Shaft IV of Grave Circle A, Mycenae, which is usually dated to the 16th century BC. It is now in the National Archaeological Museum, Athens.

The goblet is 14.5 cm high and 14.5 cm across; it weighs 295.8 grams. It has a stem, a Vapheio cup–shaped body, and two handles in the style of a kantharos. The cup is the only known example of the Vapheio shape to have a stem; it is also unusual for such a small cup to have multiple handles.

Each handle is decorated with a golden bird, which Schliemann observed was reminiscent of the cup of Nestor described in the Iliad. The birds have since been identified by Spyridon Marinatos as falcons, rather than the doves which are on the Iliadic cup. J.T. Hooker suggests that the cup is an adaptation of a Cretan design made by a craftsman on the Greek mainland. Despite the unusual design and value of the gold used to make the cup, it shows signs of poor-quality or hasty craftsmanship: for instance tool marks are still visible on the cup, and the rivets used to attach the handles to the base compromise the vessel's watertightness.

== Works cited ==
- Aulsebrook, Stephanie (2019). Materialising Mythology: The Cup of Nestor from Shaft Grave IV at Mycenae. Sympozjum Egejskie: Papers in Aegean Archaeology. Vol. 2. University of Warsaw.
- Davis, Ellen N. (1977). The Vapheio cups and Aegean gold and silver ware. New York: Garland.
- Gaunt, Jasper (2017). "Nestor's Cup and its Reception". In Slater, Niall W. (ed.). Voice and Voices in Antiquity.
- Hooker, J.T. (1976). Mycenaean Greece.
- Schliemann, Heinrich (2010) [1878]. Mycenae: A Narrative of Researches and Discoveries at Mycenae and Tiryns.
- Wright, James C. (2004). "A Survey of Evidence for Feasting in Mycenaean Society". Hesperia: The Journal of the American School of Classical Studies at Athens. 73 (2): 133–178. doi:10.2972/hesp.2004.73.2.133. S2CID 54957703.
