= Secondary cremation =

Archaeology technical terms

Primary cremation and secondary cremation are terms in archaeology for describing burials of cremated bodies.

Primary cremation refers to burials where the body is burned "on the spot", in the grave. A secondary cremation is the burning of the body in one spot and then burying the remains and grave goods elsewhere. Secondary cremation may also more specifically refer to a cremation where the body is burned on a pyre, after which the bones are collected from the ashes and buried elsewhere (Sprague 2005:138). A famous account of such a burial is that of Homer's Iliad, describing the funeral of Patroclus.
