= Peter Allan Hansen =

Danish classical philologist (1944–2012)

Peter Allan Hansen (20 April 1944 – 18 April 2012) was a Danish classical philologist known principally for his work on the Carmina epigraphica graeca I-II and on other aspects of Greek epigraphy. Born in Copenhagen he was educated at Copenhagen University and at Brasenose College, Oxford, where he was a pupil of Lilian H. Jeffery. After 1975 he settled in Oxford and through the support of scholarships and grants continued his work on Hesychios and epigraphy there.

== Selected works ==
- 'The Manuscript Tradition of Plutarch's De Malignitate Herodoti', Cahiers de l'Institutdu Moyen-Âge grec a Latin 2 (Copenhague 1969) 1-25.
- 'Ille Ego Qui Quondam ... Once Again ', The Classical Quarterly 22 (1972) 139–149.'
- Pletho and Herodotean Malice', Cahiers de l'Institut du Moyen-Âge grec a Latin 12(Copenhague 1974) 1-10.
- 'An Olympic Victor by the Name of "kles". An Archaic funerary inscription ', Kadmos13 (1974 fasc.2 publ. 1975), 156–163.'
- Friedländer, Epigrammata 177 d', Zeitschrift für Papyrologie und Epigraphik 16 (1975)79-80.Aigis 12.22
- A List of Greek Verse Inscriptions down to 400 BC An Analytical Survey. Opuscula Graecolatina (Supplementa Musei Tusculani) 3 Copenhagen 1975 (Reprinted 1978). 53pp.
- 'An Epigraphical Ghost-Name', Zeitschrift für Papyrologie und Epigraphik 21 (1976)37-38.'
- Pithecusan Humour. The Interpretation of "Nestor's Cup" Reconsidered ', Glotta 54(1976) 25–44.
- A Bibliography of English Contributions to Classical Scholarship from the SixteenthCentury to 1970. (Danish Humanist Texts and Studies, Edited by the Royal Library, Copenhagen, Vol 1) Copenhagen: Rosenkilde & Bagger, 1977. xviii, 335 pp.
- 'The Robe Episode of the Choephori', The Classical Quarterly 28 (1978) 239–240.'
- DAA 374-375 and the Early Elegiac epigram', Glotta 56 (1978 fasc. 3/4 publ. 1979)195-202.
- Ploutarchou Peri tes Hērodotou kakoētheias, Plutarchi The Herodoti malignitate.Amsterdam: Hakkert, 1979. xviii, 77 pp.
- Carmina Epigraphica graeca saeculorum VIII-V a.Chr.n. (Texte und Kommentare 12)Berlin and New York: de Gruyter, 1983. xxiii, 302 pp.
- 'The Potter Nicomachus and his Dedication (IG 14,652 = CEG 396)', Zeitschrift für Papyrologie und Epigraphik 58 (1985) 231–233.'
- 'The Date of "Nestor's Cup"', Zeitschrift für Papyrologie und Epigraphik 58 (1985) 234 Aigis 12.23
- A List of Greek Verse Inscriptions c 400-300 BC with Addenda et Corrigenda to CEG (LGVI 2). Opuscula Graecolatina (Supplementa Musei Tusculani) 28 Copenhagen 1985. 52 pp.
- 'The Corpus of Greek Inscriptional Epigrams', Actes du IX'e Congrès Internationald'Épigraphie grecque et Latin 1 (1987) 167–171.
- Carmina Epigraphica graeca saeculi IV a.Chr.n. (CEG 2). Accedunt addenda et Corrigenda ad CEG 1 (Texte und Kommentare 15) Berlin & New York: de Gruyter, 1989.xvii, 358 pp.
- 'Diogenes the Cynic at Venice', Zeitschrift für Papyrologie und Epigraphik 82 (1990)198-200.
- Hesychii Alexandrini Lexicon. Volumen III: Π - Σ. (Sammlung griechischer und lateinis-cher grammatiker 11/3). Berlin and New York: de Gruyter, 2005. xxxiv, 404 pp.
- (With Ian C. Cunningham) Hesychii Alexandrini Lexicon. Volumen IV: T-Ω. (Sammlung griechischer und lateinischer Grammatiker 11/4). Berlin & New York: de Gruyter, 2009. xxxii, 281 pp.

== Sources ==
- Obituary published in Aigis
