= Earthenware ceramics in the Philippines =

Philippine ceramics are mostly earthenware, pottery that has not been fired to the point of vitrification. Other types of pottery like tradeware and stoneware have been fired at high enough temperatures to vitrify. Earthenware ceramics in the Philippines are mainly differentiated from tradeware and stoneware by the materials used during the process and the temperature at which they are fired. Additionally, earthenware and stoneware pottery can generally be referred to as ceramics that are made with local materials, while tradeware ceramics can generally be referred to as ceramics that are made with non-local materials.

== Functions ==
Earthenware ceramics had many different functions in the Philippines. In regards, to where it was produced it seems to have been in a domestic scenario. Most of the functions can be seen as utilitarian or ritualistic. According to Alice Yao, one of the main functions of earthenware was in feasting, meaning that the earthenware was mostly cooking pots, bowls and goblets. Other functions were in the reinforcing of alliances amongst groups, as it was the example between the lowlanders and highlanders in the Philippines when trading, whether political or economic. Earthenware was also used for burial, mainly secondary burial, in the form of jars and jarlets, and anthropomorphic vessels. Lastly, the earthenware was used in ritualistic and ceremonial events, such as those associated with burial.

== Techniques ==
Earthenware vessels in the Philippines were formed by two main techniques: paddle and anvil, and coiling and scraping. Although a level of highly skilled craftsmanship is present in the Philippines, no evidence of kilns are found, primarily because the type of clay to be found in the archipelago can only withstand relatively low temperatures of firing.

== Primary surface treatment ==
There are five primary modes of surface treatment in the Philippines. First is the simple scraping and perhaps polishing of the surface leaving it relatively smooth. Second is the application of liquid, which includes slipping, glazing, or painting (red hematite). Third is the incised or cutting out of various geometric patterns. Fourth is impressed similar to stamping designs directly into the surface. Finally the fifth method is applique treatment or the application of additional clay which raises the surface of the earthenware and produces a design.

== Timeline ==
=== Prehistoric and pre-colonial Philippines ===
Neolithic period in the Philippines is assigned to the timeline between c.4500 to 3000 years before present (yBP). During this period, the red-slipped pottery with circular impressions seems to have been dominant.

'Metal period' c. 2500 to 1500 bp or Metal Age (500 BCE - AD 960 or 500 BCE - 500 AD).

Pre-colonial period, there was a more centralized production of pottery in certain areas. An example of one of those sites is Tanjay in the Negros Island, which existed from AD 500 - 1600, however it extents a little into the colonial period as well. However it is important to notice that the period in which Tanjay was producing earthenware was during the mid-1st and mid-2nd millennium

During this period, earthenware ceramics were developed to cook, store food, and practice ancient rituals

=== Colonial Philippines ===
The colonial period (c. 1521–1898) in the Philippines began in 1521 when Ferdinand Magellan first discovered the Philippines and would end in 1898 when the Spanish government would sell the Philippines to the United States.

By the establishment of the Manila-Acapulco Trade, or the Manila Galleon Trade, in 1565, trade in the Philippines would start to decline as local populations and economies would be disrupted and displaced. A direct consequence of this destruction of villages and prestige goods-based economies would be the decrease in production of earthenware as well as the fragmentation of lowlanders from the highlanders.

== Post-colonial and contemporary Philippines ==
=== Post-colonial period (1946-1986) ===
Domestic Production decreased even more during this period. Utilitarian use is the only type which survived.

=== Contemporary period (1986-present) ===
Traditional, non-industrious techniques are still used today in the Philippines. These include Open-air firing, non-wheel production located in Talibon, Valencia.

== Earthenware sites in the Philippines ==
When referring to the Northern Philippines, this will include the islands of Luzon, Babuyan, and Batanes.

=== Batanes Islands ===
The Batanes Islands are a group of islands located in the northernmost region of Luzon in the Municipality of Calayan, province of Cagayan, Cagayan Valley just below Taiwan (19° 31′ 20″ N, 121° 57′ 13″ E). Archeological sites contained boat-shaped stone (limestone and coral stone) burials which are unique to the region. Several earthenware bowls and "high-fired" sherds were found associated with burial remains.

=== Babuyan Island ===
Babuyan Island is an island located in the northern region of Luzon in the Municipality of Calayan, province of Cagayan, Cagayan Valley below the Batanes Islands (19° 31′ 20″ N, 121° 57′ 13″ E). Archeological sites were discovered on Fuga Island by Willheim Solheim in 1952. Burial jars made of earthenware were the most significant find and were one of the sources or supporting evidence that Solheim utilized to create his article on burial jars in ISEA.

=== Luzon Island ===
Luzon is the largest island in the Philippines located in the northernmost region of the Philippines, north of Mindoro, Marinduque, and Masbate (16° 0′ 0″ N, 121° 0′ 0″ E). Significant sites are found at the Pintu Rockshelter in the Nueva Vizcaya Province, Dimolit on Palanan Bay in Isabela Province and Lal-lo in the Cagayan Province of Northern Luzon.

Pintu Rockshelter and Dimolit were excavated in 1969 by Warren Peterson who believed hunter and gatherers seasonally occupied the sites at approximately 5,120BP, 3,900BP, and 3280BP. Evidence of Coiling and the paddle and anvil earthenware production were found at both sites. Mainly shallow dishes with low pedestal feet were excavated at Pintu and many contained impressed circles on their surfaces. Small and large post-holes were found at Dimolit, which aided its classification as an open habitation site. Earthenware pottery interior and exterior exhibited plain or red-slipped surface treatment. Pottery found was constructed into dishes which had perforations (circle or square) on the bottom. Also globular and angled vessels were found.

Lal-lo is considered by some archaeologists to be the most extensive shell midden site in Southeast Asia. Excavations have been conducted by Thiel in 1980, Aoyagi in 1983, Aoyagi and Tananka in 1985, and Ogawa and Aguilera in 1987. A sum of 21,664 earthenware sherds have been recovered and multiple types of vessels (red-slipped jars, bowls with ring footing, and shallow bowls with paddle impressions) have been collected.

==== Kalinga ====
Kalinga is a province situated in the central region of the Cordillera Administrative Region (CAR) in northern Luzon that is bordered by the province of Mountain to the south, the province of Abra to the east, the province of Isabela to the east, the province of Cagayan to the northeast, and the province of Apayao to the north (17° 45′ 00″ N, 121° 15′ 00″ E). There are evidence, indicating part-time production of earthenware pottery.

==== Batangas ====
Batangas is a province situated in the Calabarzon region in southern Luzon that is bordered by the province of Cavite and Laguna to the north and the province of Quezon to the east (13° 50′ 00″ N, 121° 00′ 00″ E).

Most significant archaeological site is the Laurel site also referred to as the Taal-Lemery complex. Multiple field teams from the National Museum have conducted excavations at this site. Primarily Metal Age pottery is found and is considered by some to be the most equiset earthenware production found in the region post Neolithic. Vessels found are typically highly polished or re-slipped. Chinese ceramics heavily influenced earthenware production at this site. Unauthorized excavations and pothunters were detrimental to several sites. Fortunately, Maharlika A. Cuevas (Research Assistant) found one site fully intact. Cuevas claims the site may have also previously been a burial site.

Most significant artifact found is the Calatagan Pot found in Talisay, Calatagan, Batangas. Archeologist Eusebio Z. Dizon describes the Calatagan Pot as atypical and engraved with syllabic writing around the vessel's shoulder around. Additionally it the only earthenware found in the Philippines with inscriptions and is indicative of ancient writing. The inscriptions have yet to be fully deciphered and some experts believe it should be considered a National Cultural Treasure.

==== Quezon ====
Quezon is a province situated in the Calabarzon region in southern Luzon that is bordered by the province of Aurora to the north, the provinces of Bulacan, Rizal, Laguna and Batangas to the west, and the provinces of Camarines Norte and Camarines Sur to the east (14° 10′ 00″ N, 121° 50′ 00″ E).

==== Paradijon ====
Paradijon is located within the Municipality of Gubat, the province of Sorsogon, Bicol (12.912° 00′ 00" N, 124.1176° 00′ 00" E). There are evidence, indicating full-time pottery production of earthenware.

=== Marinduque Island ===
Marinduque Island is an island located east of Mindoro and west of Luzon in the Municipality of Boac, Mimaropa (13°24′N 121°58′E).

== Central Philippines ==
The region, Central Philippines, refers to the regions below Luzon and above Mindanao, which includes the Visayas.

=== Palawan Island ===
Palawan Island is the fifth largest island in the Philippines located in the westernmost region of the Philippines (9° 30′ 00" N 118° 30′ 00"E).

A few of the sites containing earthenware in the Palawan Island are El Nido, specifically Ille cave and Lipuun Point, more specifically the Tabon Caves, where the Mannungul Jar was found by Dr. Robert Fox and date to the late Neolithic.

=== Visayas Islands ===
The Visayas Islands consist of the 6 major islands:

1. Panay
2. Negros
3. Cebu
4. Bohol
5. Leyte
6. Samar

and is located in the central region of the Philippines.

The specific islands in which sites have been found are Masbate, Bohol and Negros. In Masbate, the main sites are located in the Batungan Mountain. In the island of Negros, in the region of Tanjay, there have been earthenware pottery uncovered and of low-fired production. Lastly, in Bohol island, there is a relevant burial site in District Ubijan, Tagbilaran city where earthenware was found and has been analyzed in order to assess this island as a likely source of a center of production. This research was achieved by doing petro analysis. The results of this research claimed that if Bohol were to be a center of production, other earthenwares in the region had to have similar signatures to the clay and temper existent in the Island of Bohol.

==== Panay Island ====
Panay Island is the sixth largest island in the Philippines located to the west of Negros (11° 09′ 00" N, 122° 29′ 00" E). Islas de Gigantes was a site where presentation dishes were prominent.

=== Western Philippines underwater archaeological sites ===
==== Comiran Island (Lumbucan Reef) ====
Comiran Island is an island located in the South China Sea south of Bugsuk Island and east of Balabac Island in the province of Palawan, Mimaropa (7° 54' 57.6" N, 117° 13' 13.79" E).

Partial survey of the site revealed evidence of earthenware sherds and a part of stove.

==== Pandanan Island (Pandanan shipwreck) ====
Pandanan Island is an island located in the South China Sea in the Municipality of Balabac, province of Palawan, Mimaropa (8° 17′ 25.22″ N, 117° 13′ 32.48″ E). The island of Pandanan is a relatively small island with the shape of a quadrangle and dimensions measured to be approximately 9.6 km long and 4 km wide.

The Pandanan Shipwreck was discovered by accident in 1993 by Mr. Gordirilla, a pearl-farm diver working at Ecofarm Resource Inc., when he was looking for a missing pearl basket from the seabed. Initial investigation of the site by the National Museum of the Philippines in June 1993 would pinpoint the wreckage of a seacraft to be located under a coral reef about 250 meters northeast off the coasts of Pandanan at a depth of 40 meters below sea level (8° 9′ 48″ N, 117° 3′ 6″ E). Geographically, this area resides in a strait that serves as a passageway connecting the South China Sea to the Sulu Sea. Underwater archaeological excavation would proceed from February to May 1995 and yield relatively well-preserved remains of a wooden ship (25 to 30 meters long and 6 to 8 meters wide) with a cargo of Vietnamese, Thai, and Chinese ceramics.

4,722 artifacts were recovered and were divided into various categories:

- Chinese porcelain and stonewares
- Porcelain of northern Vietnam
- Porcelain and stonewares of central Vietnam
- Porcelain and stonewares of Thailand
- Metal artifacts
- Coins
- Glass artifacts
- Stone tools

About 72.4 percent of these findings were traced to be of Vietnamese origin or under the categorization of Vietnamese ceramics. Of the 4,722 artifacts, 301 of it would be earthenware vessels and fragments. Of the 4,722 artifacts, 301 of it would be earthenware vessels and fragments.

Earthenware can be divided into five categories:

1. Pots
2. Lids
3. Jarlets
4. Pouring vessels
5. Stoves

Comparisons among earthenwares excavated in the Pandanan Shipwreck Site and other sites in the Philippines reveal several similarities like the pouring vessels in the Calatagan Sites in Batangas Province, Luzon Island that utilize a pot with incised design and a pot with polishing marks at the bottom, the stoves in Sta Ana Site in Manila, and the Butuan Sites in Northeastern Mindanao, which may suggest that the Pandanan ship may have been trading in those areas prior to its ill-fated trip. Probable causes of the wreckage can be attributed to abrupt changes in weather between amihan, the prevailing wind from the northeast (December to April), and habagat, the prevailing southwest wind (May to November), strong typhoons, or other hazardous navigational factors like coral reefs. Scholars estimate the date of the sinking to have been somewhere from the mid-15th century to the late 15th century based on the periods that a majority of these ceramics belonged to. The earliest artifact, a Chinese coin, has been identified to be from the time of Yung-le (1403-1424 AD). These findings would highlight the presence of an active network of trade and interaction between mainland and island Southeast Asia in Pre-Spanish Philippines.

==== Rasa Island ====
Rasa Island is an island located in the Sulu Sea south of Arena Island near the Municipality of Narra, province of Palawan, Mimaropa (9° 13′ 25″ N, 118° 26′ 35″E). Partial survey of the site revealed that it was probably a jar burial site with evidence of earthenware jars and pottery fragments present.

==== Ramos Island (Secam Island) ====
Ramos Island is an island located just above Balabac Island in the Municipality of Balabac, Mimaropa (8° 6′ 0″ N, 117° 2′ 0″ E). Partial survey of the site revealed evidence of an earthenware stove and jar fragments.

==== North Mangsee Island (Simanahan Reef) ====
North Mangsee Island is located between the South China Sea and Sulu Sea in the Municipality of Balabac, Mimaropa and resides by the international treaty limits that separates the Philippines from Malaysia (7° 30′ 36.8″ N, 117° 18′ 37.7″ E). Partial survey of the site revealed evidence of ceramic sherds and iron ingots.

== Southern Philippines ==
The region, Southern Philippines, refers to the region that includes the island of Mindanao and its associated islands, Surigao del Norte, Basilan, Sulu, and Tawi-Tawi.

=== Mindanao (Maitum) ===
Mindanao is the second-largest island in the Philippines located in the southernmost region of the Philippines, south of Negros, Siquijor, Bohol, Leyte, and Samar (8° 00′ 00″ N, 125° 00′ 00″ E).

The site of Maitum is where Maitum anthropomorphic pottery was discovered by Mr. Michael Spadafora, a consulting geologist, when he was treasure-hunting for Japanese World War II gold bars on June 3, 1991. Initial survey of the site by the National Museum of the Philippines later in 1991 pinpointed a Miocene limestone cave about 1,000 meters inland and 6 meters above sea level in Pinol, Municipality of Maitum, province of Sarangani, South Cotabato, Soccsksargen(6.1303° 00′ 00″ N, 124.3816° 00′ 00″ E). The site showed indications of looting, most likely by treasure hunters, as the entrance of the cave has been damaged, various deposits disturbed, and artifacts being carelessly left on the floor after being dug up. During this time, this region had also been relatively unstable due to the Moro Conflict (1969–2019) between the Government of the Philippines and the Moro National Liberation Front (MNLF). Despite this, archaeological excavation of this site would continue and undergo through three phases: the first phase (November 6, 1991 to December 1991), the second phase (April 8, 1992 to May 3, 1992), and the third phase (January 17, 1995 to February 15, 1995).

The archaeological team headed by Dr. Eusebio Dizon would be able to recover 200 artifacts: 29 of which were complete with minor damage, 20 of which were restorable, and the remaining of which were fragments. The Maitum anthropomorphic burial jars of Mindanao are uniquely characterized by designs featuring human figures (arms, hands, breasts), facial features (heads, eyes, ears, nose, mouth), and facial expressions. The people depicted on these pottery are believed to be of the initial inhabitants of Mindanao and the "specific dead persons whose remains they guard".

The types of pottery decoration utilized are:

- paddle impression
- cord-marking
- incision
- geometric incised designs
- angular incised designs
- scroll pattern painted in black (organic carbon derived from burned plant materials and other deteriorated organic materials in clay) and red (hematite painted on the surface before firing)
- foot rings with cut-out patterns

Associated materials of these burial jars would include iron blades, shell implements and ornaments, glass beads and bracelets, human teeth and phalanges, and earthenware jarlets and beads. Comparisons among earthenwares excavated in the Maitum Site and other sites in Southeast Asia reveal several similarities like the earthenware shards from Tambler, the Manunggul Jar from Palawan, and Ban Chiang pottery from Thailand. However, as of now, the Philippines is the only area in Southeast Asia where this type of burial jar can be found. General consensus among scholars have estimated the date of these ceramics to be from the Metal Age in the Philippines, which ranges from 500 BC to 500 AD. These findings would uncover a part of Philippine prehistory that had been lost and forgotten for generations and highlight the importance of protecting, preserving, and conserving archaeological sites in the Philippines.

=== Tawi-Tawi (Balobok rockshelter) ===
Tawi-Tawi is a group of islands located in the southernmost region of the Philippines known as Bangsamoro and resides by the international treaty limits that separates the Philippines from Malaysia (5° 12′ 00″ N 120° 05′ 00″ E).

The Balobok Rockshelter is a multi-component habitation site located at Sanga Sanga Island in the province of Tawi-Tawi (5° 4′ 21″ N, 119 ° 47′ 7″ E). It was first reported to the National Museum of the Philippines in 1966. Partial excavation of the site would be made in 1969. It wouldn't be until the re-excavation of the site in 1992 where it yielded earthenware shards of thick bodied wares and small vessels.

Radiocarbon dating of shell samples split the site into three distinct cultural layers:

1. Cultural Layer I
  - 8000 $\pm$ 110 BP (6050 BP)
  - 8760 $\pm$ 130 BP (6810 BC)
2. Cultural Layer II
  - 7290 $\pm$ 120 BP (5340 BC)
3. Cultural Layer III
  - 5140 $\pm$ 7100 BP (3190 BC)

Of the three distinct cultural layers, earthenware sherds were recovered from Layers II and III. Layer II suggests a hunting and gathering culture based on the lithic tools and debitage, refuse heaps of shells, bones of land and sea animals, and sparse amount of pottery. Layer III suggests a different culture based on the advanced tools like adzes, gouges, and axes, debitage, an opaque glass bead, and the abundance of pottery.

The types of pottery decoration utilized are:

- plain
- polished
- incised
- impressed
- cord-marked
- slipped
- lime inlay
- a combination of the above

== Nearby regions ==
=== Prehistoric ===
Based on the analysis of prehistoric pottery in Southeast Asia conducted by Wilhelm G. Solheim II in 2003, red-slipped and small stamp-impressed potteries would travel eastwards throughout island Southeast Asia into the western Pacific by the Nusantao by around 4000 BP.

Early pottery from island Southeast Asia can also be found in:

- Taiwan, associated with the Yuan-shan Culture
- Galumpang at Sulawesi, Indonesia and Batu Ejaya II and Leang Burung at southwestern Sulawesi
- Flores, Indonesia
- Philippines (Palawan, Batanes, Masbate, etc.)
- Marianas, Micronesia
- Lapita Culture

=== Contemporary ===
Based on the analysis of contemporary pottery in mainland Southeast Asia conducted by John N. Miksic in 2003, there have been six different types of production techniques identified.

1. Type A
  - Thai-Korat; North-East Thailand
  - hollow cylinder without a base
2. Type B
  - Tai; North-Central Thailand
  - slow wheel (turntable) or bat
3. Type C
  - Mon-Khmer; Austronesian?
4. Type D
  - Eastern and Southern India?
  - fast wheel
5. Type E
  - Northern Thailand, Burma
  - fast wheel
6. Type F
  - Central Vietnam
  - fast wheel - similar to Type D and E; scraper - similar to Chinese production?

Of the 6 types, Type C shows similarities to earthenware potteries. Type C earthenware are generally constructed from a pre-form of coils added to a flat base up to the upper rim where it is shaped. The insides and outsides are then either smoothed or scraped by a spatula, paddle, or anvil. Regions that utilize Type C earthenware are situated along the peninsular Malaysia and Vietnam coast.

== See also ==
- History of the Philippines (900–1565)
  - Tradeware ceramics in the Philippines
