= Philippine symbolism in archaeology =

Symbolism is an abstract meaning given to an object or representative of one. Symbols can define certain aspects of cultures making them initially exclusive to particular groups. When it comes to symbolism in archaeology, artifacts found may display iconography with these abstract symbols or tell us more about the people who made them through their construction. Symbolism is not limited to only inanimate objects but can be found in the actions or being of living things as well. The Philippines, comprising more than 7,000 islands, is an archipelago where symbols of the past and present contribute to its unique culture. These symbols are influenced by and noticeable in burial practices, rituals, social status, architecture, agriculture, and The Philippines' place in the Austronesian world.

== Burials ==
For archaeologists, burials of all types can give more information about how the deceased was living causing them to be important when looking at a culture. In Philippine archaeology, we find a variety of different burial forms ranging from coffins to mummification. A form of burial that has an obvious form of symbolism is the use of jars in secondary burials. Wilhelm Solheim, an American anthropologist has stated that burial jars can tell an archaeologist three things in particular: the relation of groups due to the jar's design as well as the way they were positioned and the items that are associated with these burials. Jar burials are a Neolithic feature that included different sizing that denotes primary or secondary burial type and can be found in open spaces and caves alike. Other burial types include mausoleum burial sites composed of larger structures representative of the deceased individual. Items commonly associated with these burials include beads, metals, bones, shells, porcelain and religious iconography.

=== Manunggul Jar ===
The Manunggul Jar was discovered in the Tabon caves by American anthropologist Robert B. Fox who worked in conjunction with Miguel Antonio during their excavation on the island of Palawan in 1962. The Manunggul Jar is a type of secondary burial meaning that the body had been moved after an initial burial which can be ceremonial. The discovery of the Manunggul jar gave archaeologists a better understanding of the Philippines' early belief in the afterlife.

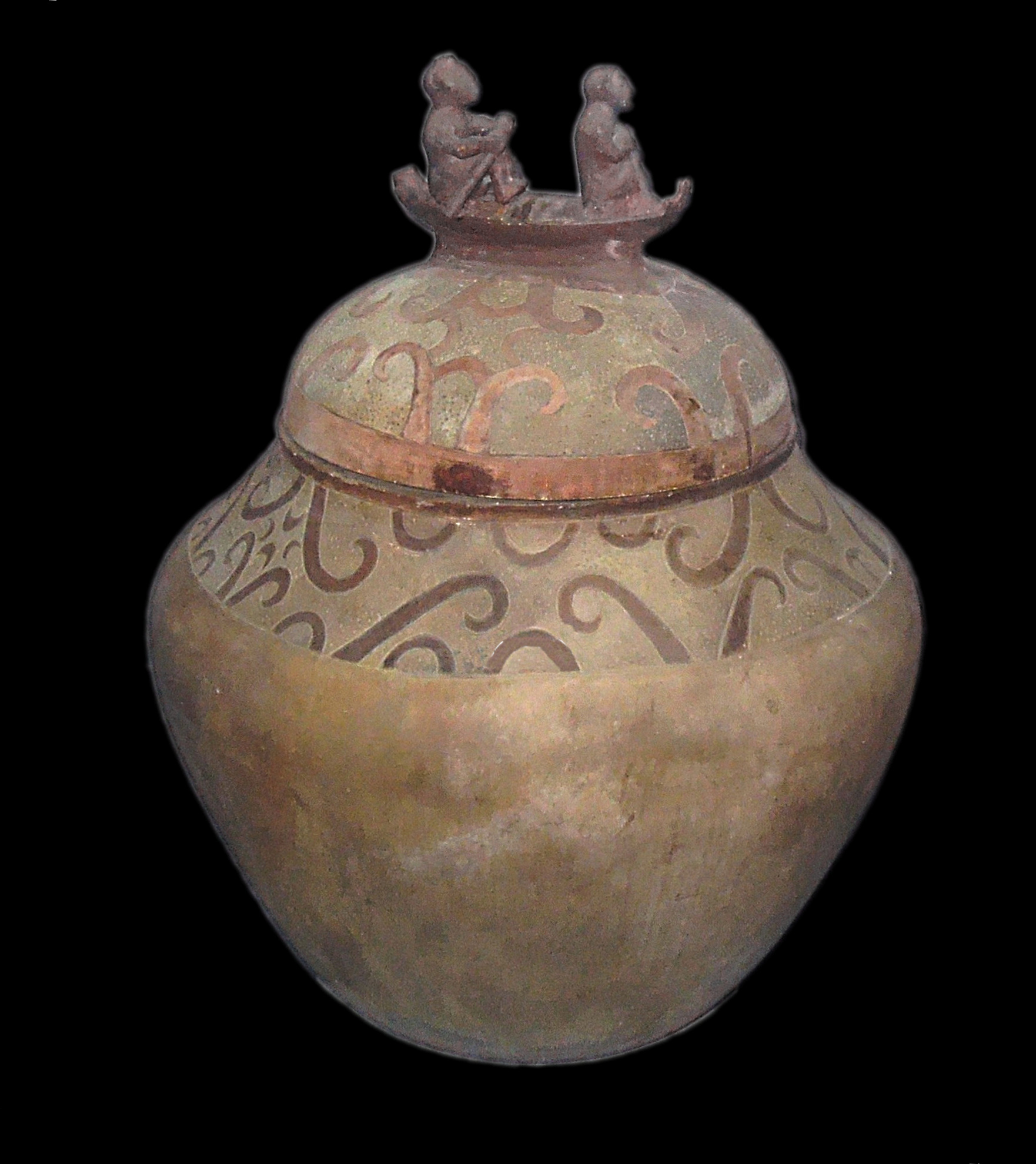
The Manunggul Jar

The Manunggul Jar is an earthenware that has been considered a national treasure of the Philippines. The symbols seen on this pottery are representative of maritime culture as well as traditional burial arrangements. The scrolls that adorn the upper section of this pottery are made of hematite and resemble the waves that these early Filipinos would have been sailing on. The very top of the jar's lid is decorated with two figures in a boat sailing into the afterlife with one in the back end of the boat rowing and the other with its arms crossed looking out into the distance. The significance of the figure with its arms crossed is that this representative of arm arrangement in primary burials in the Philippines.

=== Mausoleums ===
Mausoleums are physical structures that are representative of the way people lived. The Manila South Cemetery is home to burial sites of both elite and lower-class individuals. Burial sites themselves can be indicative of social status, wealth, and identity of the deceased. Mausoleums require regular maintenance and therefore are only affordable to wealthier individuals such as businessmen, merchants, political officials, and other elites. Therefore, it is uncommon for mausoleums to be decorated with imagery of religious affiliations, family names, and other symbols that depict cultural identity. On the contrary, lower-class individuals unable to pay for a burial site end up being placed aside in bags along with others who are also unable to. The distinctions between social classes carries on after death in burial site differences.

== Rituals ==
Ritual practices in the Philippines contain a kind of symbolic meaning that is passed down through generations through continuous participation which can include inanimate objects to represent a higher power or be caused by an event in their daily lives. Rituals such as those that take place in Ifugao transpire underneath homes or in granaries year-round for reasons such as marriage, prestige feasting, or death. These rituals included the sacrifice of animals which were typically domesticated to represent purity. The number of animals that were sacrificed during these rituals was a symbol of wealth and power in these communities as just to have these animals was a large expense, thus making a household's ability to sacrifice more than one for any ritual during the year to be a clear sign of significant wealth and social status. The reason that these rituals occur is based on the perceived benefits that come with these events such as a good harvest, good health, hunting success, and overall protection from negative forces.

== Agriculture ==
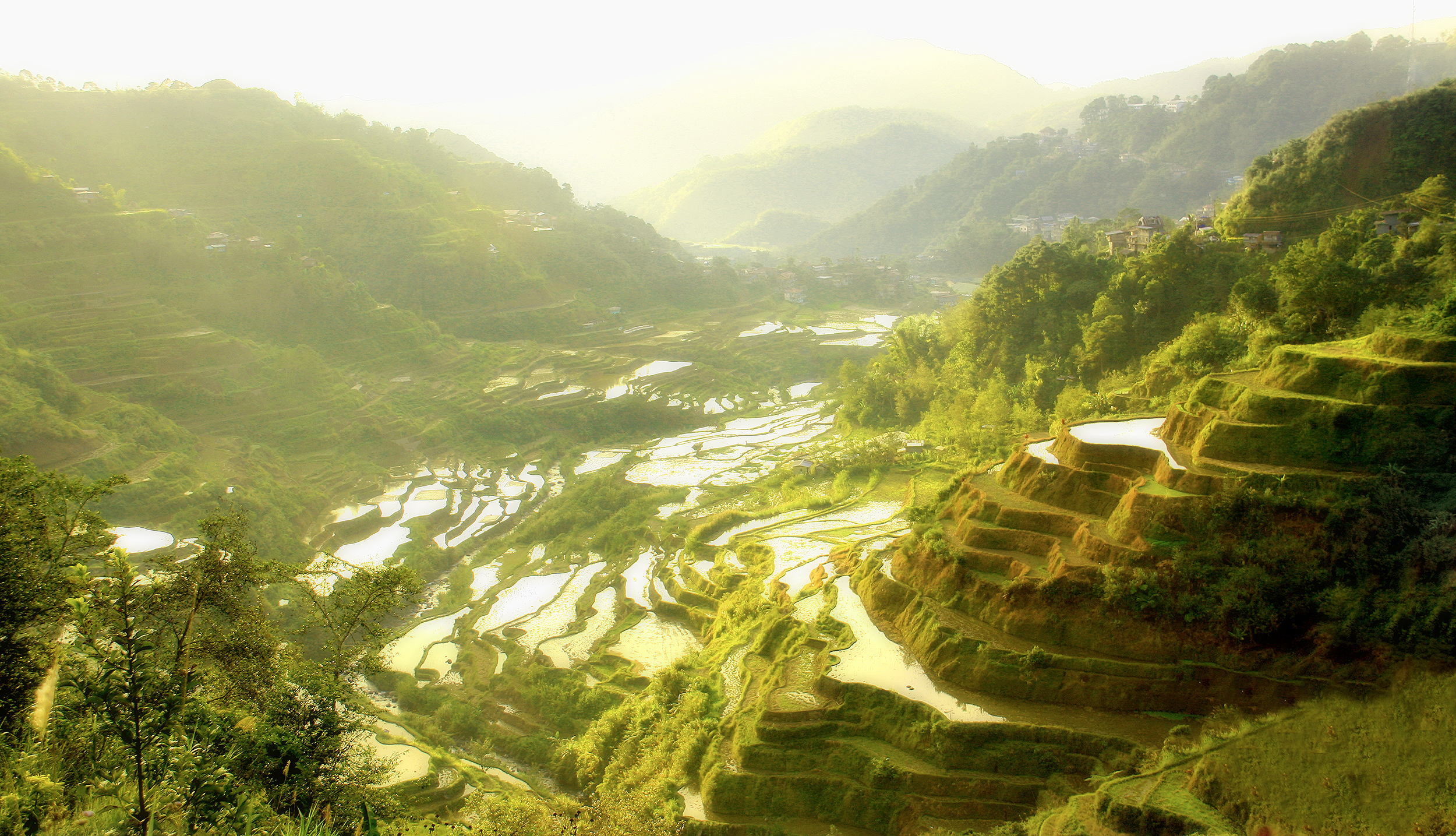
Ifugao Terraces

Pigs are one of the most common animal to be used for animal rituals, usually in celebration of the conclusion of a good year or of a good seasonal harvest. Animal rituals are only able to be sponsored by rice producers, therefore, characterizing the group of Filipinos able to harvest wet-rice as the wealthy social class. The animals, however, are bought from Filipinos without the resources to grow wet-rice; since pigs are grown by potato consumption. The number of pigs, or animals, used in a feast is directly indicative of the power and helps the sponsor gain prestige. Three examples in which animal rituals are a symbol of closure or initiation of a new micro-era are: Fiestas, Media Noche, and Noche Buena. Fiestas, the more common example, are thrown for the conclusion of a good season or at the start a new project. Media Noche is symbolic for the conclusion of a good year. Noche Buena, has a religious symbol attached to it because the animal ritual occurs in Celebration of the birth of Jesus on the night of December 24th.

There are rules to animal rituals, a noteworthy rule symbolizing purity stem from the commonly accepted condition that wild animals are considered inappropriate to sacrifice. Consumption of meat immediately after a formation of an alliance, and family unions, is symbolic of the following shared belief, "consumption and distribution of meat during feasts strengthen kin relations and solidifies non-kin relations". There is archeological evidence of agricultural symbols because there is a larger amount of pig skeletal remains dating to after the arrival of the Spanish to the Philippines. Also, there was a flip in the correlation of low-land wet-rice grounds to the Ifugao rice terraces supported by the proper dating of such terraces by an estimate, product of the Bayesian method. In other words, since the arrival of the Spanish, association of lack of wealth with the highland taro and potato fields, switched to an association of wealth with the rice terraces formed in the highlands to create distance between the Spanish and the Ifugao wet-rice elite. Rice production still symbolized wealth, but the location connection to wealth was flipped.

== Spanish Colonialism ==
Pericolonialsim, in unsuccessful colonialism that affected the population socially and economically. Pericolonialsim effects through agriculture are located in the above section. Sometimes this term refers to the politically "unconquered" areas the Philippines, such as Ifugao locale, a frontier area that has been called pericolonial. However these areas show signs if colonialism influence. Furthermore, professor Acabado writes, "ethnographically, the concept of pericolonialism is manifested in language, myths, and material symbols

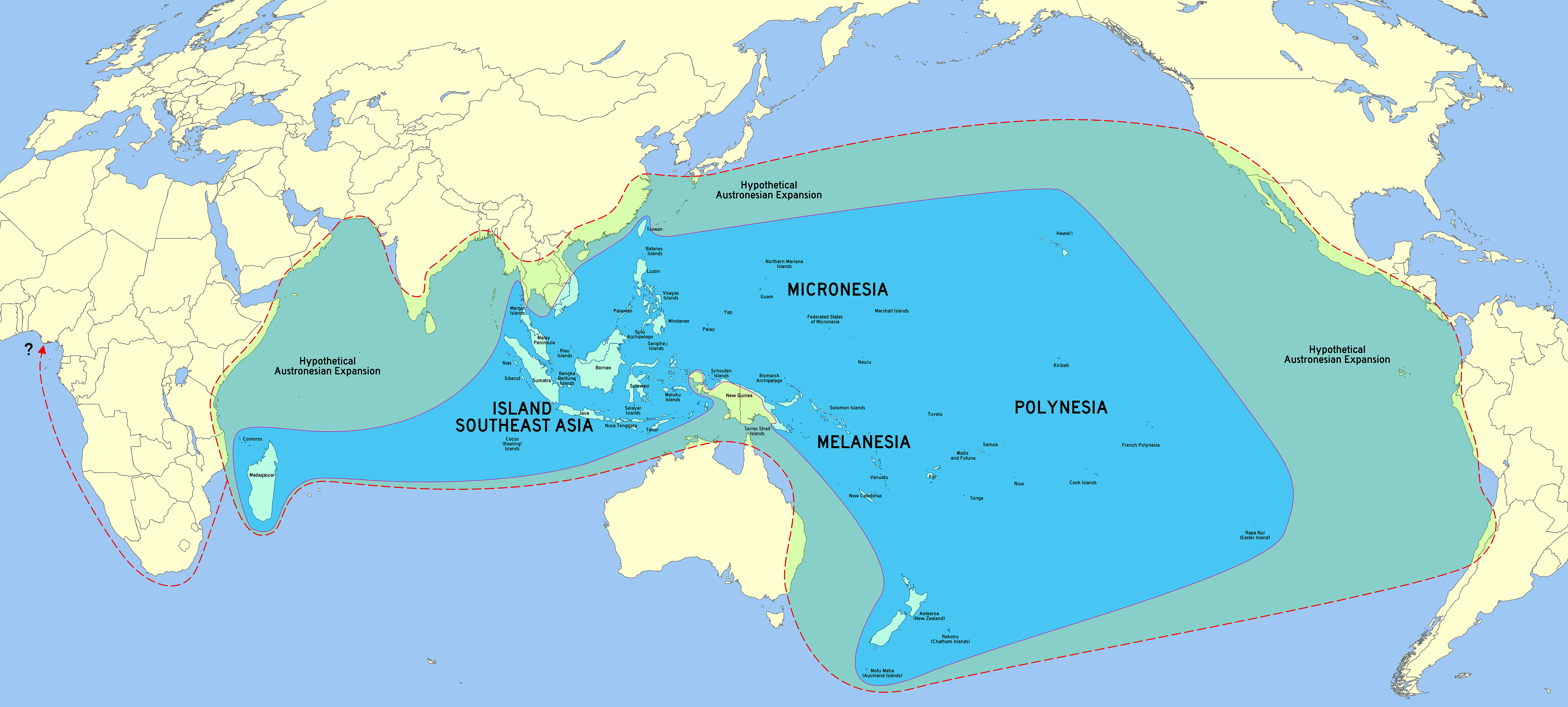
Austronesian World

=== Peñafrancia Festival ===
Colonialism influenced agriculture through the economy and social prestige, but there are still living religious traditions of colonialism in present day Philippines. For example. The Peñafrancia Festival in the Naga City, Bicol, Philippines, is a fiesta carried out every year in September, where mostly men participate in an attempt at physically touching the wooden religious figure of Our Lady of Peñafrancia (the Virgin Mary) for good luck and health. There is an adopted symbolism of athleticism and strength attributed to men that stemmed from the Spanish culture, because the mission to come in physical contact with the wooden religious figure is one in which men crowd surf and work with each other. Gendered fiestas and patrilineal traditions in the Philippines did not dominate in pre-Spanish contact Philippines because wet-rice lands had previously been inherited through the use of bilateral con-sanguine kinship system.

=== Colorism ===
Despite the usual use of an inanimate object to represent an idea, a person's skin color was a symbol of your social status and directly correlated with wealth; due to the caste system implemented by Spanish Colonialism. Colorism continued to exist for the following colonial power, the United States of America. Mid 20th century the American anthropologist Henry Otley Beyer, during his assignment to the Philippines, produced the Beyer's Waves of Migration Theory. This theory was based on the idea that the darker group of people called "the negritos" arrived prior to an Indonesian group and to civilized Malay group.

== Link to the Austronesian World ==
The Austronesian world extends from Madagascar on the West to Polynesia in the East, then Taiwan and Micronesia to the North. This geographical location is joined by the theory that a proto-language existed and unified all of these countries and territories not attached to any mainland continent. There are problems with linking this connection to language because language travels faster than human migration.

=== Tattoos ===
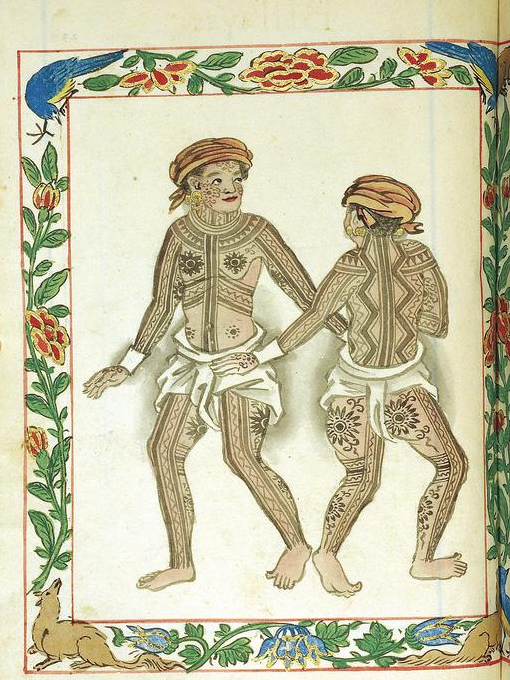
Pintados- Visayans as portrayed in the Boxer Codex

Across the Austronesian world, and mostly to the west of the Philippines, tattoos were a common way to incorporate symbolism to solidify a cultural, traditional, or religious belief. For example, archeological evidence exists of mummified bodies with body tattoos. Other accounts such as the Hispanic Boxer Codex, provide examples of the Visayans, who the Spanish called "pintados", the painted ones. Meanings and ingredients were different but, the method was the same for all tribes. Most tribes used a form of needle or heated piece of iron, but the Isneg of Apayao had a unique instrument called the Igihisi.

=== Ceramics ===
==== Sa-huynh-Kalanay pottery and Lapita pottery ====
Sa- huynh-Kalanay pottery was found in the Kalanay cave in Masbate, Philippines and the Lapita pottery is from Malenesia. Despite the fact that Lapita (red Slip) pottery does not stem from Kalanay cpottery, they share similar form and elements of design. In 1988 Solheim went as far as to say that "the relationship between the two was vital to understanding cultural history".

==== Sun and Bird Symbols ====
According to Grace Barretto-Tesoro, "In Pangasinan, Agneo, the sun, and Bulan, the moon, were children of a powerful god, the ruler and creator." Ceramics contained designs reminiscent of the sun denoting leadership and power. The blue birds found on some porcelain plates, is said to be the same bluebird that the Tagalog venerated.

== Ornaments ==
Ornaments found between the Neolithic and Metal Age regardless of whether they were locally or non-locally produced point to advancements in technologies and cultures. Non-local ornaments suggest trade was common prior to colonial influences. As a result, it points to a more advanced culture inconsistent with narratives of a primitive culture prior to colonialism. Instead, there are established systems that deal with trading and producing ornaments.

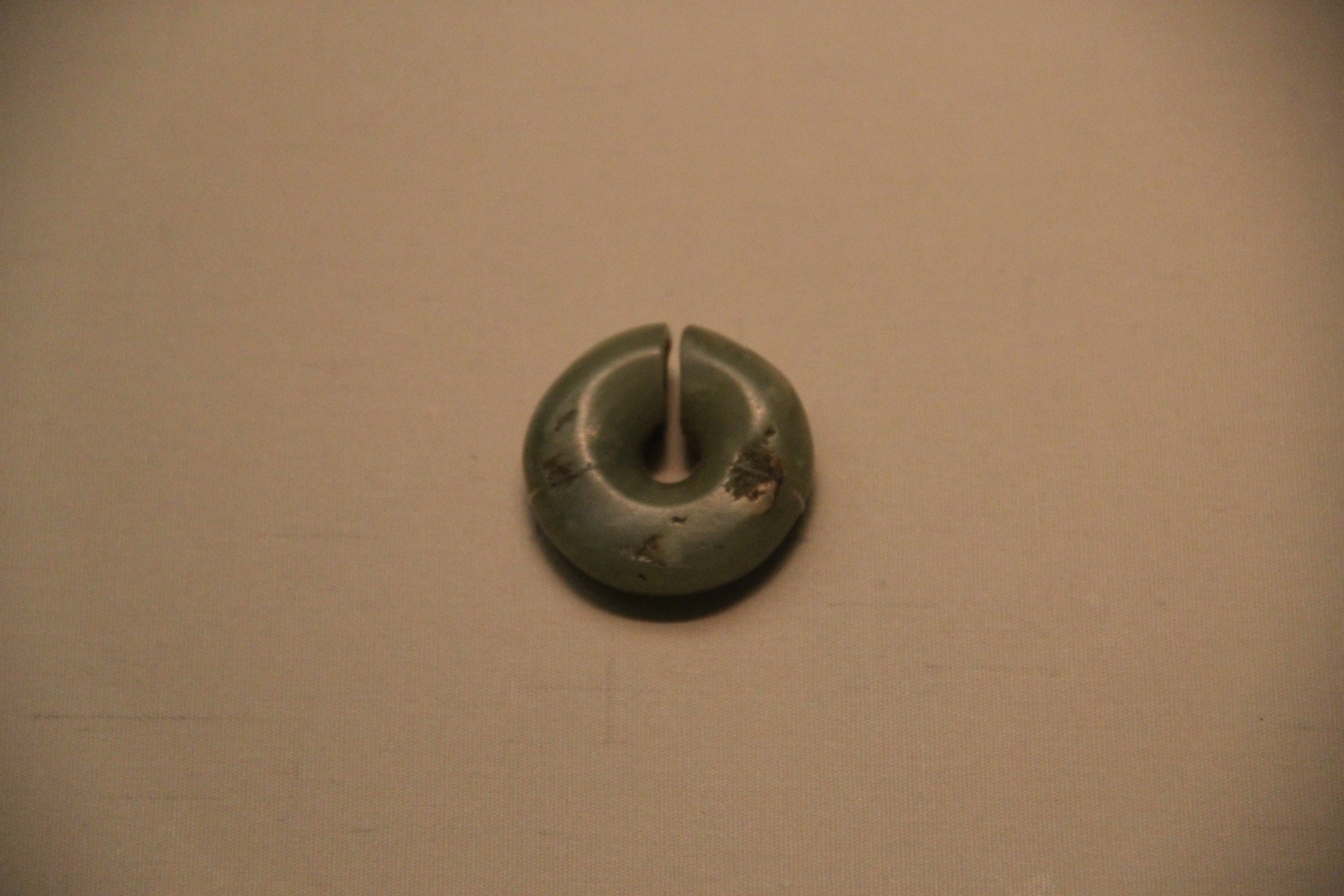
Neolithic Jade Ornament

=== Jade ===
Although jade ornaments found from the Neolithic period are not local resources from the Philippines, discovery of jade ornaments in Tabon Caves suggests development of culture and technology since it implies early trade with China and Taiwan. Aside from trading relationships being formed, early Filipinos learned to produce similar ornaments made out of jade using metal-drill techniques leading to cultural advancements. Due to jade being an exported good and less accessible, it was considered a prestigious good and therefore associated with high-status and considered a symbol of the wearer's beauty. Metal ornaments resembling jade ornaments continue to be worn by the Ifugao as representations of social status and power.

=== Shell ===
While shell ornaments are abundant in Tabon Caves, they were considered less valuable in comparison to exotic goods because of their local availability. This does not mean that shell ornaments were not important. They are still considered important factors in building and maintaining social relationships. Shell ornaments have become embedded in Philippine culture as they have transcended through time despite their lack of prestige.

== Sociopolitical Symbolisms ==
Symbolisms in sociopolitical structures deal with power dynamics in both chiefdoms and governments. In both cases they highlight the importance of wealth and power in maintaining hierarchies that give chiefdoms and government the ability to control communities. Outside influences such as colonialism have affected modern sociopolitical structures, but chiefdoms continue to be a part of Philippine communities.

=== Chiefdoms ===
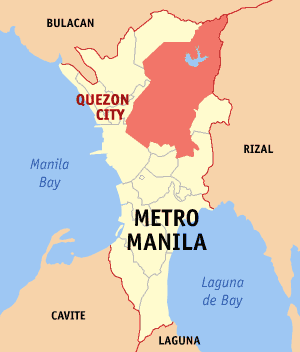
Manila, Capital of the Philippines

Chiefdoms are sociopolitical structures that represent systems of wealth and status. Wealth and higher social status in chiefdoms can be achieved through the ability to host massive feasts for the community with prestigious foods, such as meats. On the other hand, wealth and status in Visayan traditions was demonstrated in a different manner than the Ifugao. The community would offer prestigious items to chiefdoms as a form of ritual and therefore prestige came from having the most valuable resources to oneself. As such, there was a link to a prestige goods economy where chiefdoms could control who has access to certain resources. This in itself represents local relationships with trade and serves as a symbol of Philippine political alliances with international bodies. These types of trading systems can be traced back to past forest hunter-gatherer relationships with coastal people that also predate colonial influences.

=== Government ===
Manila was established as the capital of the Philippines under colonial government rule and was meant to symbolize a set towards modernization. With modernization of the Philippines arose idea of capitals being a symbol of progress and the way other cities should be. This acts as a way of legitimizing the power held by the government itself. There are also attempts to propose an image of national identity and unity based on the buildings and monuments that are erected in public spaces. However, there lacks mention of the ways in which government exerts their power and control by dictating where and how people live. As a result, capitals such as Manila are heavily influenced by colonial ideologies and continue to affect the way Philippine communities live and the narratives about their past.
