= George R. Ellis =

American art historian

George R. Ellis (born 1937) was an author, art historian and director of the Honolulu Museum of Art from 1982 to 2003.

== Life ==
George Ellis was born in Birmingham, Alabama. He received a BA in art history from the University of Chicago in 1959 and an MFA in painting from the same institution in 1962. He began his career as a painter. However, he later became assistant director of the Birmingham Museum of Art and then associate director of the Museum of Cultural History at the University of California, Los Angeles.

Highlights of his tenure at the Honolulu Museum of Art include establishment of the Academy Art Center at Linekona and construction of the Luce Pavilion. He served on the boards of directors of the Bernice P. Bishop Museum, the East–West Center, the International Arts Society, the Japan-American Society, and the Manoa Heritage Society. In 2002, Ellis received the Alfred Preis Award from the Hawaii Alliance for Arts Education.

== Works ==
His publications include:

- Casino, Eric S., George R. Ellis, Wilhelm G. Solheim II, Father Gabriel Casal and Regalado Trota Jose, People and Art of the Philippines, Museum of Cultural History, University of California, Los Angeles, 1962.
- Ellis, George R., Growing with the Museum of Cultural History, University of California, Los Angeles, 1981.
- Ellis, George R., Hokusai and Hiroshige, Asian Art Museum of San Francisco, San Francisco, 2000, ISBN 0-295-97766-3.
- Ellis, George R., Japanese Treasures from the Honolulu Academy of Arts, Honolulu Academy of Arts, Hawaii, 1996.
- Ellis, George R., Oceanic Art, a Celebration of Form, San Diego Museum of Art, 2009, ISBN 978-0-937108-46-8.
- Ellis, George R. and staff, A Decade in Retrospect. Works from Asia, Europe, The Near East, Africa, North and South America, Indonesia and Oceania, drawn from Museum Collections, University of California, Los Angeles, 1974.
- Ellis, George R. and Marcia Morse, A Hawaii Treasury, Masterpieces from the Honolulu Academy of Arts, Tokyo, Asahi Shimbun, 2000.
- Norris, Ben, Margaret Norris Castrey and George R. Ellis, Ben Norris, American Modernist, 1910-2006, University of Hawaii Press, 2009.
