= Tradeware ceramics in the Philippines =

Ceramics produced in different countries and traded within the Philippines

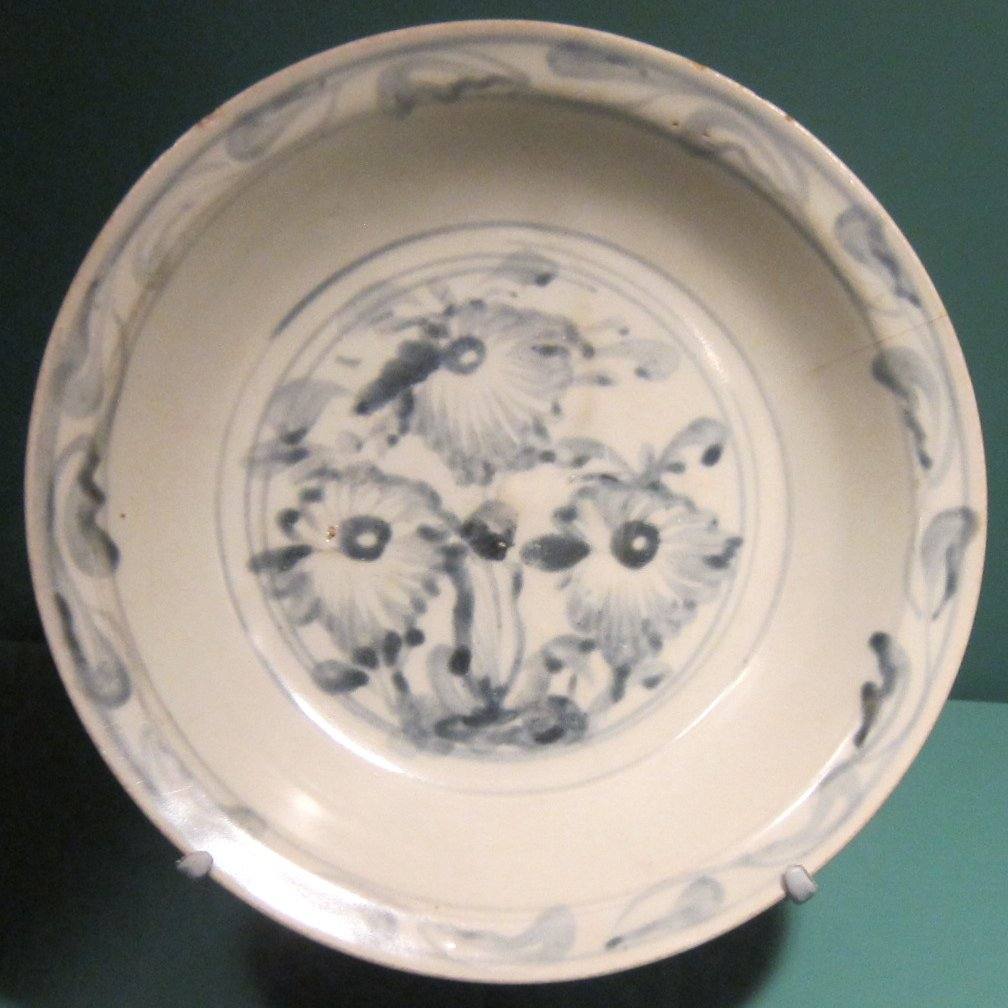
Chinese porcelain in the Philippines - 15th c.

Tradeware ceramics in the Philippines are ceramics produced in different countries and traded within the Philippines. They are often referred to as export ware and became popular due to their kaolin-type clay that was difficult to replicate. Tradeware ceramics in the Philippines range from Pre-Spanish arrival through the Manila Galleon of the Colonial period. Leading scholars in this field are Carl E. Guthe, Li Jian'an, Li Min, Olov Janse, and Robert Fox.

The main periods of this trade include Yuan (1271–1368), Early Ming (1368–1464), Middle Ming (1465–1522), Late Ming (1522–1644), and the Transitional Period (1644–1683). The primary types of Chinese blue-and-white porcelain found in the Philippines are Jingdezhen and Zhangzhou ware. These porcelain are classified from type I-V.

The case studies of burials and ritual in relation to Philippine tradeware ceramics illustrate the sociopolitical importance of these vessels.

== Materials ==
Tradeware ceramics in the Philippines consisted of Chinese, Thai, and Vietnamese porcelain. The materials discovered can be identified as 70-75% Chinese, 22-25% Thai and 5-8% Vietnamese. The wares are named by their place of manufacture, individually by various popular terms and the period in which they were produced. The most common ceramics found in this region are Chinese blue-and-white porcelain, primarily Jingdezhen and Zhangzhou ware.

=== Jingdezhen ===
Jingdezhen, a hub for Chinese ceramic production in Jiangxi, was a main source of high quality porcelain that dominated the international Chinese porcelain market. By the end of the 14th century, primary production sites in Jingdazhen shifted from bluish-white colored wares to predominantly blue-and-white porcelain. This blue-and-white porcelain was extremely valuable by the Middle Ming Period. Its widespread distribution is revealed through Kraak porcelain found in European, colonial, and shipwreck archaeological contexts. Kraak ware can be classified as any thin, blue-and-white glazed porcelain with a rough base that has diverging chatter markings. The surface is embellished with dividing panels that illustrate an array of motifs such as plants, birds, insects, and humans. Kraak primarily originated from Jingdezhen production sites and was intended for the Middle Eastern and European market. Exported products proved to be more profitable than domestic products; because of this, Kraak ware is typically of higher quality than that of wares traded within local markets. Jingdezhen ceramic production applied local technological traditions that involved smaller gourd-shaped kilns. Only a small amount of wares could be fired per round and at a slower rate, which resulted in the highest quality wares with smooth glazes and translucent white color. In addition, the Jingdezhen potters implemented a multitude of measures to inhibit sand and other debris from the floor from adhering to the firing vessel.

=== Zhangzhou ===
In the 16th century, the seaport of Yuegang in the Zhangzhou region prospered as it took part in the expanding international maritime trade. A predominant portion of the ships leaving the Yuegang port were headed towards the Philippines on a journey that only took fifteen to twenty days. The Yuegang seaport soon shifted to the forefront of international maritime trade, and as a result, export-driven businesses that focused on silk and ceramics were multiplying all throughout Zhangzhou at an exponential rate. By the end of the sixteenth century, the Zhangzhou products still proved to be extremely valuable in an international market that was customarily overshadowed by suppliers with Jingdezhen products. European traders generally bought lesser quality Zhangzhou wares as financial capital for products and services offered by indigenous groups, whereas they typically used the refined Jingdezhen wares for their own European local markets (and the elites that live there). As a result, the study of Zhangzhou porcelain has broader implications such that it can point to interactions between colonizers and the colonized since archaeologists often find porcelain that originated from Zhangzhou in diverse archaeological contexts that range from California to South Africa. As newly discovered trade routes enabled for the expansion of international trade, the ceramic production in Zhangzhou increased in order to maximize profits. The production sites in Zhangzhou are closely associated with the mass-production of unrefined and substandard quality tradeware. This is due to the applied shortcut version of firing the wares in large step-chamber kilns which, in turn, compromised the quality in order to save time and produce a high volume of wares. These relatively lousy quality wares were intended to replicate the sophisticated quality wares produced in Jingdezhen.

== Periods ==
The age of tradeware ceramics are divided into two main periods based on Spanish contact with the Philippines: Pre-Spanish arrival and Post-Spanish arrival. The Pre-Spanish arrival consists of the Yuan, Early Ming, and Middle Ming periods. The Post-Spanish arrival includes the Late Ming and Transitional periods.

Pre-Spanish Arrival
Yuan	1271 - 1368
Early Ming	1368 - 1464
Middle Ming	1465 - 1522

Prior to Spanish arrival and the Manila Galleon trade, tradeware ceramics were limited to high-ranking elites and chiefs. During the thirteenth and fourteenth centuries of the Yuan period, porcelain was traded at large volumes. Near the end of the fourteenth century, the primary ceramic for trade shifted towards blue-and-white porcelain.

Post Spanish Arrival
Late Ming	1522 - 1644
Transitional Period	1644 - 1683

In the Late Ming period, 69% of all tradeware ceramics discovered in burial sites and caves are Zhangzhou ware and 31% are Jingdezhen ware. The quality of Jingdezhen ware are much finer than the standard Zhangzhou ware.

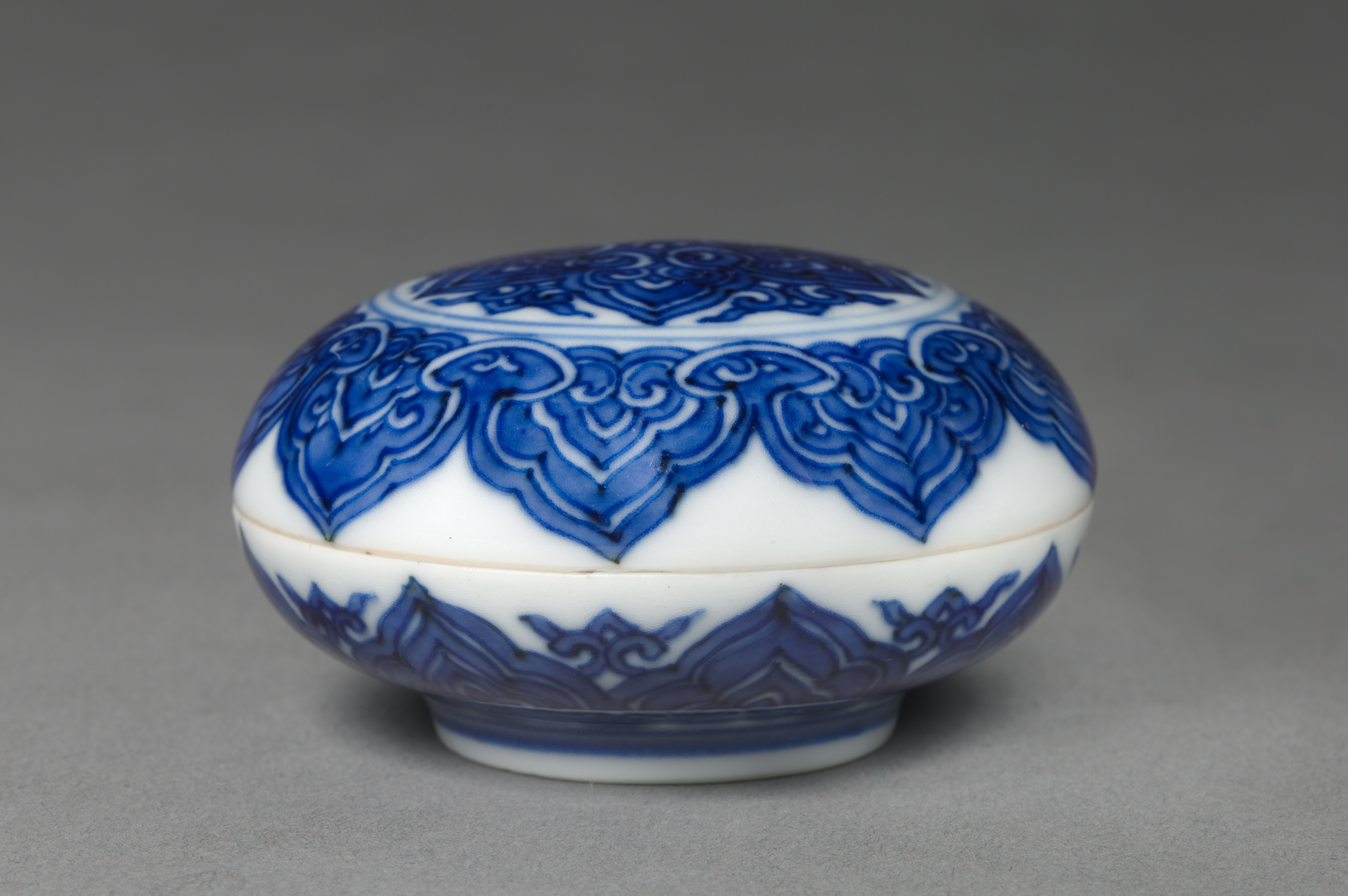
Jingdezhen - Ming Dynasty (1368-1644)

== Classification of Blue & White Porcelain ==
In order to compare the quality of different types of porcelain across varying eras found at different production sites, a classification system produced by Li Min (2013) is often used. It comprises five different types and has enabled archaeologists to analyze the broad trends in porcelain utilization within the local societies.

=== Type I ===
Porcelain classified as Type I have an exterior appearance that is clear and glassy. Since the body is composed of fine-grained kaolin clay, the body has an even, polished texture and looks white translucent in color. The overall construction is of utmost refinement and emphasized high quality.

There is a strong association between ceramic production centers and the level of quality of the wares. Most Type I porcelain have a high probability of originating from the production site of Jingdezhen. Most importantly, Jingdezhen was a site that produced relatively higher quality of wares compared to that of the lackluster, poor quality Zhangzhou wares. This is due to the fact that the Jingdezhen site utilized the local technological tradition of small gourd-shaped kilns that fired a low quantity of wares per round. Also, by the end of the fourteenth century, Jindezhen slowly transitioned from bluish-white ware to the classic white porcelain look.

=== Type II ===
Porcelain classified as Type II have a glaze that is a hazy off-white color and not as translucent in comparison to Type I wares. At first glance, Li Min (2013) has described the appearance as a hybrid of a gray colored porcelain-stoneware with a hazy glaze. Although the porcelain is constructed with somewhat subpar quality, it is still considered to be of higher refinement than those wares that were mass-produced and, thus, were of lower quality.

=== Type III ===
Porcelain classified as Type III have characteristics of deteriorating quality, such as crudely constructed and inelegant glaze. The glaze has inconsistent dismal-looking color throughout the body that has many bubbles. The material is made of light slender gray stoneware instead of the traditional kaolin clay.

The majority of wares that belong to the classification types III-V have a high association to the production site at Zhangzhou. Maritime traders that wanted to profit off of the expanding global trade of the sixteenth century generated export-driven factories in Zhangzhou. These sites made massive quantities of relatively inferior quality wares that duplicated the external appearance of Jingdezhen wares; oftentimes in literature, these Zhangzhou wares are referred to as Swatow wares by archaeologists. To expedite the rate of production, an alteration of the traditional technology traditions was made, in which Zhangzhou production sites utilized large step-chamber kilns that enabled a higher volume of wares to be generated. To meet the demands of global trade, quantity was prioritized over the quality of the wares. While the European traders preferred the highest quality wares from Jingdezhen for their local European markets, they often used the unrefined wares from Zhangzhou as a method of payment for a variety of goods and services accepted from native groups of people with whom they came into contact with as they traveled across countries.

=== Type IV ===
All porcelain classified as Type IV are covered in an imperfect, patchy glaze that has consists of a few cracks. There are a higher concentration of bubbles present all throughout the surface that are larger in diameter. Type III and Type IV generally have the similar same external appearance, but the degree of substandard quality present within Type IV is more extreme. The rushed method of kiln firing results in uneven glazes that are tacky and syrupy. The material is made of a grainy clay paste that has a harsh texture and a dismal-looking gray color.

=== Type V ===
Porcelain classified as Type V were typically not traded on the market considering the fact that the unsophisticated outer appearance did not warrant any interested buyers on the market. This is because the surface of the wares are covered with pinholes and cracks that would flake when held. Before these wares were placed in the kiln to fire, the clay material was not compacted or purified, which led to the coarse texture of these dilapidated wares.

== Case studies ==
=== Calatagan, Batangas ===
Calatagan is situated near the Batangas Province southwest of Manila. The leading scholars in this region were Olov Janse who started excavating prehispanic Calatagan burials during the 1940s and Robert Fox led his excavations from 1958 through the 1960s. Out of 1,296 burials, infants, children, juveniles, and adults were found. Furthermore, the majority of tradeware porcelain plates had solar designs or bird motifs that were placed over the pelvis in burials. For example, a Karitunan adult (KR-50) in Calatagan was buried with several grave goods in addition to a blue-and-white porcelain plate over the pelvis with chrysanthemum design. The tradeware ceramics in the grave of KR-50 had a gold ring, blade, solar motifs, and a stone charm to indicate this individual's participation in raiding and trading. In Grace Barretto-Tesoro's Where Are the Datu and Catalonan in Early Philippine Socieites? Investigating Status in Calatagan, she claims this individual (KR-50) was most likely a male datu who had a prestigious role in Pre-Spanish society due to his expertise in raiding and maritime trade. The catalonan healers in Pre-Hispanic Philippines also had a prestigious position in society and assisted in ritual sacrifices by striking porcelain vessels in order for their Tagalog deities to hear them during the offering procession.

=== Balingasay, Bolinao ===
Balingasay, Bolinao is in the province of Pangasinan and this burial site dates to the fourteenth-fifteenth century. 51 adults were buried at this site and an infant was interred in a Chinese brown-glazed Ming jar that dates back to the late thirteenth-early fourteenth century. According to Grace Barretto-Tesoro's Burial Goods in the Philippines: An Attempt to Quantify Prestige Values Pre-Spanish societies in the Philippines traded forest products for Chinese porcelain, silk, gold, and jewelry. In the Tanjay region, chiefs from upland communities were in charge of redistribution of prestige or foreign goods and glazed Asian tradeware had restricted distribution. Thus, prior to colonialism in the Philippines, tradeware ceramics were a marker of social status and were passed down to the next generation as discussed in the Balingasay, Bolinao case study.

=== Old Kiyyangan Village, Ifugao ===
The 2012 excavation of the Old Kiyyangan Village in Ifugao was led by Stephen Acabado, Grace Barretto-Tesoro, and Noel Amano. This research revealed that upland communities in Ifugao used tradeware ceramics for rice wine production and these vessels were only accessible to the elites (kadangyan) who controlled wet rice cultivation. Furthermore, rice was considered a prestige good and was redistributed by the kadangyan in feasting rituals to form alliances with lowlanders. Thus, rice was not viewed as a monetary form of currency in Ifugao but rather as an active participant in ritual practices.

== Significance ==
Porcelain production was stimulated as a result of the changing chiefly dynamics among indigenous groups within the Philippines. Porcelain served as symbols of political influence, as they were not only used in ritualized feasts associated with life crises and calendrical events, but also negotiation incentives amongst polities. A study in Tanjay, Negros, Philippines demonstrated that the immense quantity of foreign porcelains in burials and settlements increased significantly from the fourteenth to the sixteenth centuries. Prior to the fifteenth century (and the introduction of the Manila Galleon trade), the high-quality exported porcelain were predominantly limited to high-ranking elites and chiefs. The importance of competitive feasting in chiefly polities and status competition can be seen through the decrease in quality of porcelain (from more diverse to less diverse vessels), in which large inventories of less attractive porcelain (lower quality) were intended for a growing market of lower social class. Once the Manila Galleon trade was in full effect, the quality in porcelain starts to decrease dramatically, ultimately leading to porcelain tradewares becoming more accessible to lower class communities. The large influx of several competing porcelain producers (of varying quality) from China resulted from the placement of high value on foreign porcelain in Philippine political economies.

== See also ==
- History of the Philippines (900–1565)
  - Earthenware ceramics in the Philippines
- History of the Philippines (1565–1898)
  - Manila galleon
