= Pandanan shipwreck =

Archaeological site

Coordinates: 8.1633°N 117.0516°E

The Pandanan Shipwreck is an archaeological site which was excavated in 1995 by the Underwater Archaeology Division of the National Museum of the Philippines in Pandanan Island, in the coast of Southern Palawan. The ship was surmised to be a Southeast Asian cargo boat travelling from either Vietnam or Southern China and is one of the best preserved pre-Spanish trading ships within the jurisdiction of Philippines. It is speculated that the ship stopped at some ports in mainland South East Asia to load trade wares. Bad weather might have led to the sinking of the ship.

The boat's dimensions are about 25 to 30 meters long and about six to eight meters wide. It had a flat bottom which was suited for riverine water. The Pandanan shipwreck is considered a rare site dated approximately at the mid-15th century because, as per Sakuma (1989), the Chinese imperial court ordered complete banning of all private trading within this time.

== Discovery ==
The discovery of the shipwreck was accidental. A long-time diver from the Ecofarm Systems Inc. (a pearl farm in Pandanan Island) named Eduardo Gordirilla stumbled upon the site by chance and found jars in the seabed as he was looking for a lost basket containing giant oysters. He then informed the manager of the farm, Efren T. Anies, who consequently called upon the national museum on June 9, 1993. Although a report about the wreck was submitted as early as 1993, it was only in 1995 that the official extensive excavated began. Surveying was done within the span of one year (1993 to 1994).

The ship was spotted under a coral reef cliff covered in sand and mud and is relatively near the land mass-only 250 meters away from the northeast coast. Typical holes were discovered along the divisions of the bulkhead of the ship so as to aid in letting water pass as it is pumped out. In addition, only one fourth of the body of the ship remained intact. Two theories were proposed for the ship's condition. One is the infestation of the exposed wood by tropical sea worms. Second is the destructive capability of the rapid water currents. The area is well-dated due to the presence of Chinese coins and ceramics. This site is considered a major step in discovering the culture of the country as there is little written records and archives about the Philippines and South East Asia in general during the 15th century.

== Location and geography of the site ==
Using the Global Positioning System (GPS) the coordinates were identified to be eight degrees, nine minutes and forty-eight seconds (8° 9′ 48″) north latitude and one hundred seventeen degrees three minutes and six seconds (117° 3′ 6″) east longitude and had a depth of approximately 40 meters below sea level. The Pandanan Island is 9.6 km long and 4 km wide and shaped like a quadrangle.

Grid maps were also made so as to accurately note the part of the site where a certain artifact was discovered.

== Site excavation ==
Three rafts were employed in the Pandanan excavation. The first raft was used to travel the generator for the SCUBA tank compressor and for supplying power to the submersible power pump. As for the second raft, it was used to carry and store diving gears and wet suits. The last raft served the role of lifting and delivering the artifacts that were obtained from the underwater site. Dredging systems were used to clear away the mud, sand and coral that covered the ship. Once artifacts have been lifted from the site, they were immediately put in a saltwater bath. This allowed the limestone and coral to keep its layers from being damaged. Archaeologists and Conservators then cautiously cleansed, tagged and put the recovered ceramics in a protective storage before it was sent to the National Museum.

All operations were undertaken only done during the day in order to maintain the safety of the divers and staff as well as to the inefficiency of work and low visibility during the night. Divers excavated for thirty minutes before ascending. They spend an hour for decompression stops to eliminate dissolved inert gases such as nitrogen in the blood- starting from 15 meters then ascending at three meters increments and switching from air to oxygen at the last two stops.

== Artifacts retrieved ==
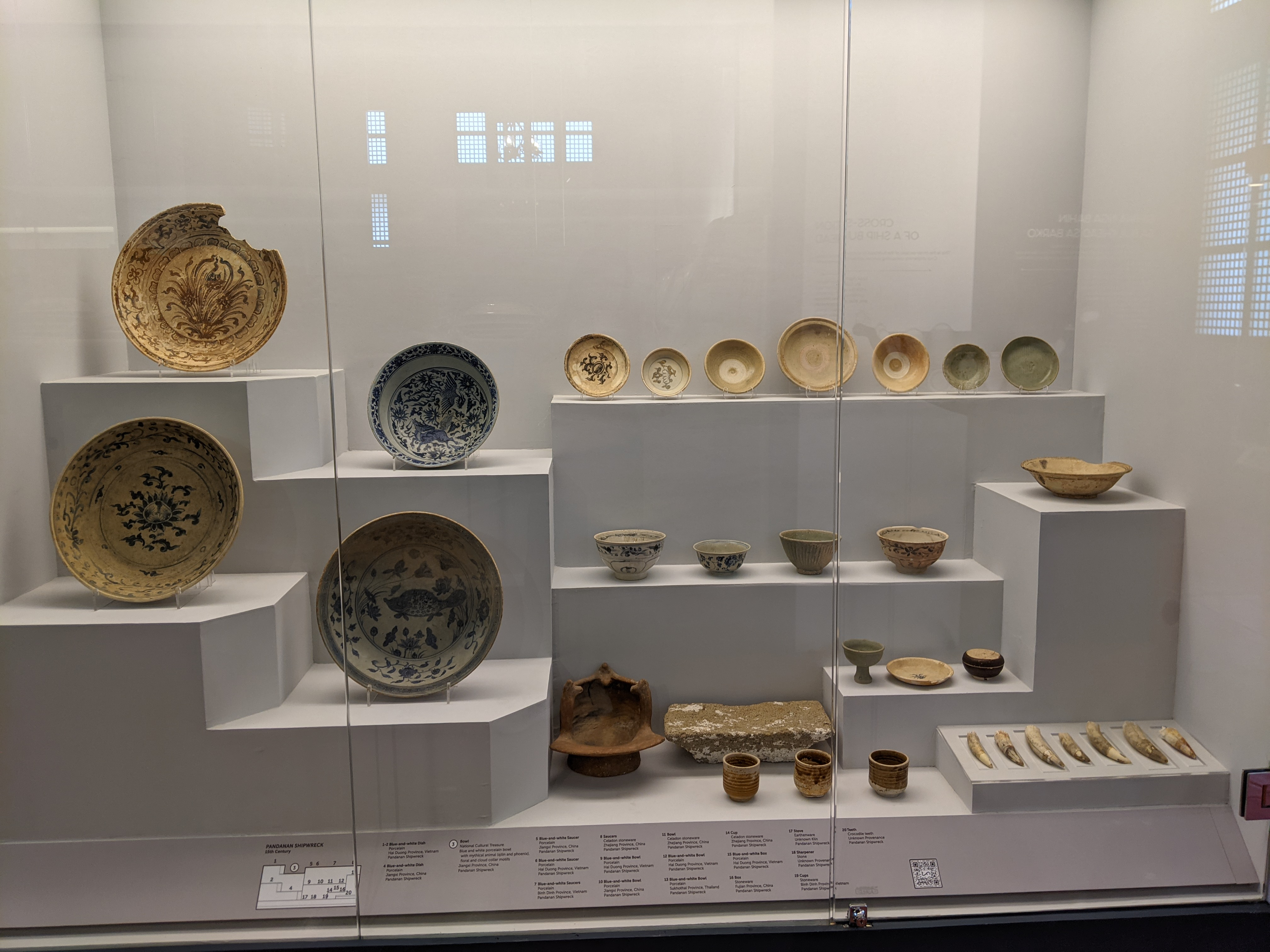
Part of the Pandanan Shipwreck collections displayed at the National Museum of the Philippines - Cebu

A total of 4,722 artifacts have been recovered from the ship, a major percentage of which are Vietnamese ceramics (at 72.4 percent). These finds are categorized into six main groups depending on their kinds namely: Porcelain and ceramics, metals, coins, glass artifacts (beads), stone tools and earthenwares. These are discussed individually below.

=== Chinese porcelain and stonewares ===
The Chinese porcelain category are made up of blue-and-white materials as well as the white wares, both of which have been manufactured in Jingdezhen kiln. The blue-and-white wares consist of several items such as saucers, bowls, large bowls and small jarlets. Another blue-and-white item was a Ming dynasty bowl with qilin. On the other hand, white wares accounts for the two pieces of gourd-shaped pouring vessels- Yuan dynasty spotted Qingbai double gourd pouring vessel. The spots from the gourd were applied by putting droplets of ferrous oxide on the white glaze. The Celadon wares produced in Longquan kiln have also been located and these were composed on dishes with floral flaring rim, bowls having lotus patterns, saucers and stemmed cups. The Chinese stonewares that were made in kilns in Fujian and Guangdong provinces in southern China were in the form of six eared jars donned with a dragon design.

=== Porcelain from Northern Vietnam and Central Vietnam ===
The porcelain from Northern Vietnam was also blue-and-white ware which were manufactured in Chu Dau kiln. These were consisted of bowls, dishes, pots, jarlets, covered boxes and lastly water droppers. Meanwhile, the porcelain and stonewares from Central Vietnam were speculated to be produced on the Go Sanh kiln in Binh Dinh Province in Central Vietnam. These consisted mainly of celadon saucers and dishes with an unglazed ring portion inside it.

=== Porcelain and stonewares from Thailand ===
The porcelain from Thailand were consisted of a large bowl with a fish design drawn in iron pigment inside made in the Sukhothai kiln. As for the stonewares, it was a black brown glazed four-eared jar and was manufactured in Noi River kiln.

=== Metallic artifacts ===
Under this category were bronze artifacts and iron tools. The bronze items were made up of two small canons, a lamp, a scale balance, a mirror, a covered box, a disc, a fish hook, a ferrule and lastly five gongs. The latter consists of a sword, a knife and approximately 60 pieces of cauldrons.

=== Chinese coins ===
The Chinese coins were dated to be from 1403 to 1424 AD. One of them was determined to be a coin issued during the reign of the Yongle Emperor.

=== Stone tools ===
There were 21 grinding stones excavated from the shipwreck. These were postulated to be used for honing and sharpening metal blades such as swords and knives or for processing of food.

=== Earthenwares ===
A total of 301 earthenware vessels and fragments were recovered from the wreck. These were further classified into five categories according to type namely: pot, lid, jarlet, pouring vessel and stove.

==== Pots ====
Four restorable pots were found of which one has a design and the remaining three pots without design. The decorated pot has a carination at the middle of the body and an out-turned rim of about 15.6 centimeters diameter, 10.8 centimeters height and 17.2 centimeters maximum body width. A pronged tool was said to be used to carve decorations from the neck to the anterior portion of the body. In addition, two parallel vertical lines are added extending from the neck to the upper part of the body at 7 to 8 millimeter intervals. As for the lower ends of the parallel lines, they were bordered off with incised horizontal wavy lines. It is heavily substantiated that this pot was used for cooking in the ship due to the soot covering the upper body of the said pot.

Meanwhile, one of the plain pots was found to have polishing markings on the bottom executed in just one direction. It also had an out-turned rim. This pot had 13.7 centimeters of rim diameter, 8.2 centimeters of height and 13.2 centimeters of bottom width. As from the specified dimensions, it can be observed that it is a relatively small pot. This whole pot was covered completely in soot with the exception of te bottom part.

The second plain pot which had a designated accession no. 3684 is larger compared to the previous pot. This, too had an out-turned rim. It had a rounded bottom as well. The dimensions are as follows: 17.1 centimeter rim diameter, 10.8 centimeter height, and 17.7 centimeter maximum body width. Soot covered the pot from the outer surface until the curved part.

The third plain pot donning the accession no. 3044 had an out-turned rim and rounded bottom just as that from the second pot. It had a rim diameter of 14.8 centimeters, a maximum body width of 19 centimeters and a height of 14.5 centimeters. Soot covered it from the outside of the rim to the angled portion of the body.

==== Lids ====
Under this category, there were three whole artifacts of the similar shape was located. They were all characterized as having a concave top portion and a convex bottom portion. They also had a small knob at the center of the top part and two of them had knobs with a flattened top and the other with a knob with a rounded top. One was 11.8 cm–11.9 cm in diameter and 2.6 cm–2.7 cm in height. The rest was at 14.3 cm in diameter and 3 cm in height. Reddish brown particles were scattered over the lids too. All the lids are proposed to have been created in Thailand due to the iconic shape of the three.

==== Jarlet ====
There was only one piece of jarlet. It had an out-turned rim, a short neck plus an ellipsoidal body. Rim diameter was measured to be 6.8 cm, maximum body width is 10 cm and height is 6.5 cm. Horizontal markings caused by wiping at the rim and neck were identified as well.

==== Pouring vessels ====
Two vessels were excavated and one of them was preserved well such that it was almost complete. In contrast, the other one had a missing rim and neck—hence only the body and bottom remained intact.

The almost complete pouring vessel had a spherical body. The outer surface had a dimple at the center and a horizontal applique ridge at the upper part of the body. The bottom was polished. The incomplete vessel had an ellipse body shape and the upper part is quite flat in comparison. The center portion is higher than the outside portion and a 3.1 cm diameter hole. Maximum body width is 16 cm, the height of remaining body is 9.7 and width of spout is 7.3 cm measured at its junction to the body.

==== Stove ====
There are two sections of the stove. The first is used to cradle the pod and the second is the lighted firewood underneath. The long end of the wood stretches until the other section where the cook can maneuver the firewood to keep the strength of fire under control.

There are three types of stove identified. The first type has a fan-shaped for the part used in putting firewood, and a half-cut cylindrical shape for the part used in burning the wood. The second type is quadrangular for the part used in putting firewood. It also has low walls around the edges. Lastly the third stove type has a similar quadrangular shape for the part used in putting firewood, and a cylindrical shape with quadrangular cut in front for the part used in burning. It looks like a ring from the top and three small cleats are attached around the ring.

=== Glass beads ===
The glass beads were found inside the Vietnamese stoneware jars. Only two colors of the beads were present- black and red. Several aspects of the beads were specified by Jun Cayron (2006) to be able to determine the origin of the beads. The first proposed method was through chemical analysis which is a technique based on the composition of the material and after which the result was then to be compared with data from several manufacturing sites. However, aside from the high cost and unavailability of the procedure, the technique is believed to be unreliable in this situation and will contribute very little to the bead-sourcing according to Dr. Peter Grave and other experts. This is mostly because the glass’ deterioration is unstable due to the submersion for hundreds of years.

Thus, physical analyses had been the main method used. The stylistic attribute (color and decoration), form attribute (shape and size) and technological attribute (method of manufacture) of 204 glass Pandanan beads were consequently studied and compared with the 20 glass beads from Sungai Mas. The study revealed that the beads from the two sources were very similar in their overall diameter and perforation diameter- 17 pieces (85%) from Sungai Mas had identical match with those from Pandanan site. Therefore, it was concluded that Sungai Mas was the source of the Pandanan glass beads.

== Implications on theory of trade ==
The location of Sungai Mas at the northwest coast of Malaysia suggested that in order to reach South China Sea and Philippines the beads were travelled towards the east coast across the Malaysian peninsula. In turn, the Malaysian peninsula could be reached either en route Malacca strait (if by sea) or Sunda Strait (if by land). The Pandanan ship is said to be a Southeast Asian cargo boat from South China or Vietnam, and most likely travelled southward stopping at either port of Patani or port of Singora where the Sungai Mas beads were loaded together with other trade goods. Then from the port, the vessel traversed towards northern Borneo and then to Labuan. Consequently, it may have entered the Balabac Strait on its way towards southern Palawan where it ultimately sank.
