= Nusantao Maritime Trading and Communication Network =

Hypothetical Neolithic Asia-Pacific trade and communication network

In a hypothesis developed by Wilhelm Solheim, the Nusantao Maritime Trading and Communication Network (NMTCN) is a trade and communication network that first appeared in the Asia-Pacific region during its Neolithic age, or beginning roughly around 5000 BC. Nusantao is an artificial term coined by Solheim, derived from the Austronesian root words nusa "island" and tao "man, people". Solheim's theory is an alternative hypothesis to the spread of the Austronesian language family in Southeast Asia. It contrasts the more widely accepted Out-of-Taiwan hypothesis (OOT) by Peter Bellwood.

Solheim emphasizes the cultural aspects of the Southeast Asian people, whereas Bellwood's theory places more emphasis on the linguistic origin of people.

Solheim first suggested the concept in 1964. The NMTCN attempts to explain the diffusion of cultural traits throughout the Asia-Pacific region, a pattern that does not seem to match the projections of cultural spread by simple migration theories. Today, it is one of the dominant theories for the early peopling of the Southeast Asian region.

Solheim suggests that "[if] elements of culture were spread by migrations, then the spread would have been primarily in one direction." He suggests that since the pattern of cultural diffusion in the Asia-Pacific region is spread in all directions, it is likely that the spread of cultural traits happened via some kind of trading network, rather than a series of migrations.

In Solheim's hypothesis, the people who constituted this trading network are referred to as "the Nusantao".

I now define Nusantao as natives of Southeast Asia, and their descendants, with a maritime-oriented culture from their beginnings, these beginnings probably in southeastern Island Southeast Asia around 5000 BC or possibly earlier. Most of the Nusantao probably spoke a related or pre-Austronesian language, but there were likely some who spoke a non-Austronesian language as well... I did not consider non-maritime Austronesian-speakers as Nusantao.

According to a review of Solheim's book Archaeology and Culture in Southeast Asia: Unraveling the Nusantao, Solheim believed the categorization of 'Nusantao' is outdated and does not accurately represent the entirety of the culture; later calling them '"Austronesian" as their identified language.

Solheim suggests that there is an indication of a maritime network, dating back to 30,000 BC, by describing the movement of artifacts as they are found in the Philippines, northern Vietnam, coastal South China, Taiwan, Korea and Japan. Some of the artifacts described to be associated with rice cultivation include table and capstone dolmens, stepped and pediform adzes, and plain pottery. Some linguists believe this to be why there are certain Japanese words that were created in Southeast Asia; for example, a species of rice, Javanica, is present in Japan but originated in Sarawak.

== See also ==
- Austronesian maritime trade network
- Lingling-o
- Lapita culture
- Hiri trade cycle
- Sepik Coast exchange
- Kula ring

== Sources ==
- Solheim, Wilhelm G. (1984). "The Nusantao Hypothesis: The Origin and Spread of Austronesian Speakers". Asian Perspectives. 26 (1): 77–88. JSTOR 42928107.
