= Wilhelm Solheim =

American anthropologist (1924–2014)

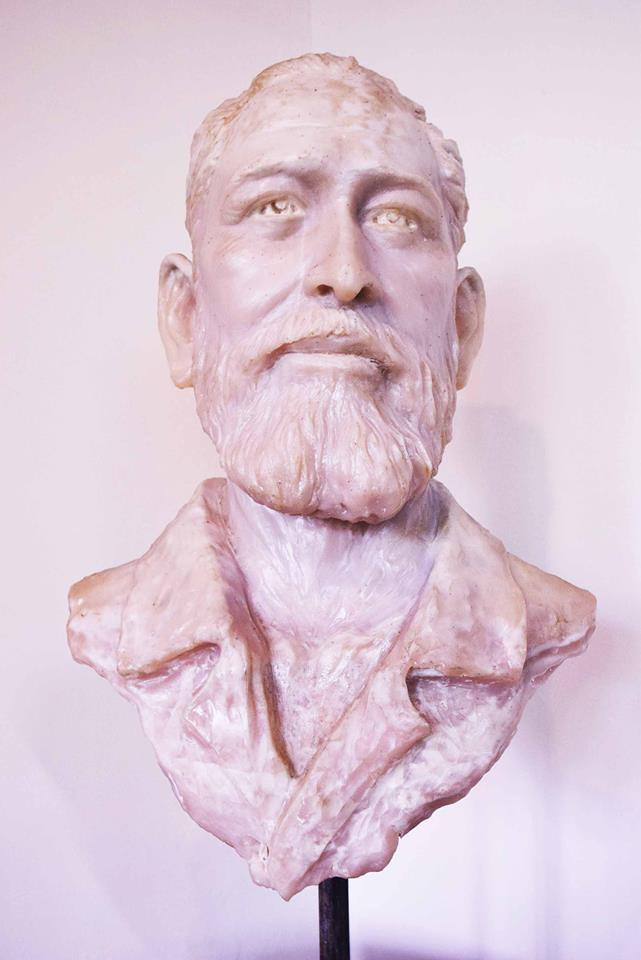
Wilhelm Solheim II's statue in the ASP-UP Library

Wilhelm G. Solheim II (1924–2014) was an American anthropologist recognized as the most senior practitioner of archaeology in Southeast Asia and as a pioneer in the study of Philippine and Southeast Asian prehistoric archaeology. He is perhaps best known for hypothesizing the existence of the Nusantao Maritime Trading and Communication Network, one of two dominant hypotheses regarding the peopling of the Asia-Pacific region during the Neolithic age.

== Life ==
Solheim and his wife Dolorlina 'Nene' Solheim built their permanent residence in El Nido, near Ille Cave. He remained in the Philippines with his wife until his death. He died on July 25, 2014, at the age of 89.

== Works in Southeast Asia ==
Solheim began his career in Pacific and Southeast Asian prehistory as a graduate student at Berkeley. His first experience was his study of E.W. Gifford's pottery from Fiji, in which under Gifford's direction, he made a refined classification in preparation for his two-part Master's thesis in Oceanian Pottery published in 1952.

From 1963 to 1966, Solheim directed the Non Nok Tha field program, a joint project of the University of Hawaii and the Fine Arts Department of Thailand, which published two reports in 1968 presenting new information on the Bronze Age in Southeast Asia.

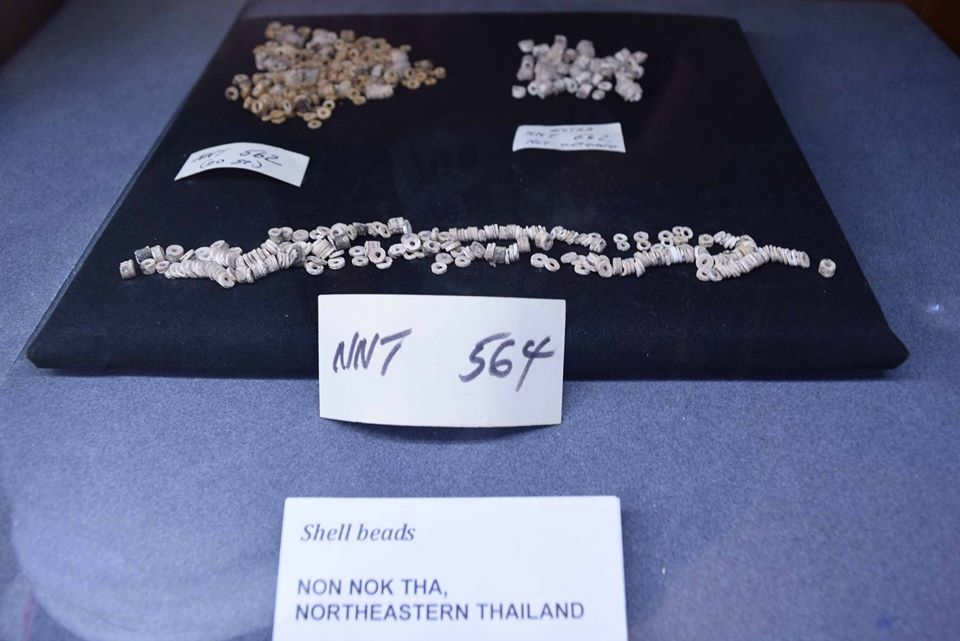
Shell beads from Non Nok Tha, Northeastern Thailand

== Selected works ==
- Casino, Eric S., George R. Ellis, Wilhelm G. Solheim II, Father Gabriel Casal and Regalado Trota Jose, People and Art of the Philippines, Museum of Cultural History, University of California, Los Angeles, 1962.
- Solheim, Wilhelm G. Archaeology of central Philippines : a study chiefly of the Iron Age and its relationships, Manila : National Science Development Board, National Institute of Science and Technology, 1964.
- Solheim, Wilhelm G. (editor). Anthropology at the Eighth Pacific Science Congress of the Pacific Science Association and the Fourth Far Eastern Pre-history Congress, Quezon City, Philippines, 1953, Honolulu, Social Science Research Institute, University of Hawaii, 1968.
- Solheim, Wilhelm G. Archaeological survey to investigate Southeast Asian prehistoric presence in Ceylon, Colombo : Commissioner of Archaeology, Ceylon Dept. of Archaeology, 1972
- Solheim, Wilhelm G., et al. Archaeological survey in southeastern Mindanao, Manila, Philippines : National Museum of the Philippines; [Manoa] : University of Hawaii, 1979.
- Solheim, Wilhelm G., et al., (eds). Pacific region 1990 : change and challenge, Washington, D.C. : Fulbright Association; [Hawaii] : Hawaii Chapter, Fulbright Association, 1991
- Solheim, Wilhelm G. Archaeology of central Philippines : a study chiefly of the Iron Age and its relationships, [Manila] : University of the Philippines, Archaeological Studies Program, 2002.
- Solheim, Wilhelm G., (edited by Victor Paz). Southeast Asian archaeology : Wilhelm G. Solheim II festschrift, Diliman, Quezon City : University of the Philippines Press, 2004. ISBN 971-542-451-1
- Solheim, Wilhelm G. Archaeology and culture in Southeast Asia : unraveling the Nusantao, (revised edition), Diliman, Quezon City : University of the Philippines Press, 2006. ISBN 971-542-508-9
