= 2010 Tarlac local elections =

2010 Tarlac gubernatorial elections

2010 Tarlac gubernatorial elections
- May 10, 2010
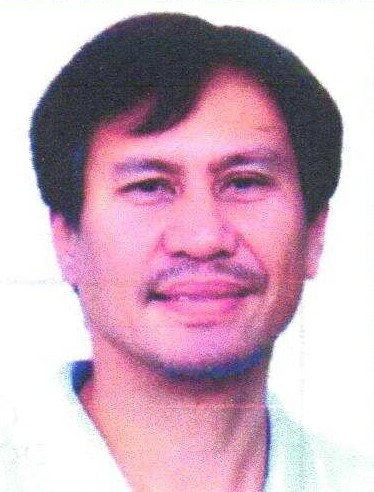
| Candidate | Victor Yap | Marcelino Aganon Jr. |
| Party | NPC | Lakas–Kampi |
| Running mate | Wilfredo Sawit | Pearl Pacada |
| Popular vote | 396,069 | 81,695 |
| Percentage | 81.02 | 16.71 |
Governor before election
Victor Yap
NPC
Elected Governor
Victor Yap
NPC
- 2010 Tarlac vice gubernatorial elections
- May 10, 2010
| Candidate | Pearl Pacada | Wilfredo Sawit | Franklin Dayao |
| Party | Lakas–Kampi | NPC | Liberal |
| Popular vote | 204,460 | 155,271 | 105,615 |
| Percentage | 35.11 | 33.37 | 22.70 |
Vice Governor before election
Marcelino Aganon Jr.
Lakas–Kampi
Elected Vice Governor
Pearl Pacada
Lakas–Kampi

Local elections were held in the province of Tarlac on May 10, 2010, as part of the 2010 general election. Voters elected candidates for all local positions: four members of the Sangguniang Panlalawigan, vice governor, governor, and representatives for the three districts of Tarlac.

== Provincial elections ==
The candidates for governor and vice governor with the highest number of votes won the seat; they were voted separately, and therefore, may be from different parties when elected. Parties are as stated in their certificate of candidacies.

=== Gubernatorial election ===
Tarlac gubernatorial election
| Party | Candidate | Votes | % |
|---|---|---|---|
| NPC | Victor Yap (incumbent) | 396,069 | 81.02 |
| Lakas–Kampi | Marcelino Aganon Jr. | 81,695 | 16.71 |
| Independent | Mario Bagtas | 5,689 | 1.16 |
| Independent | Ernesto Calma | 2,993 | 0.61 |
| PGRP | Salvador Santos | 2,429 | 0.50 |
| Valid ballots | | 488,875 | 90.19 |
| Invalid or blank votes | | 53,195 | 9.81 |
| Total votes | | 542,070 | 100.00 |
| NPC hold | | | |

=== Vice-gubernatorial election ===
Marcelino Aganon Jr. (Lakas Kampi CMD) was the incumbent but ineligible for reelection. Instead, he ran for governor (and lost).

Tarlac vice gubernatorial election
| Party | Candidate | Votes | % |
|---|---|---|---|
| Lakas–Kampi | Pearl Pacada | 204,460 | 43.94 |
| NPC | Wilifredo Sawit | 155,271 | 33.37 |
| Liberal | Franklin Dayao | 105,615 | 22.70 |
| Valid ballots | | 465,346 | 85.85 |
| Invalid or blank votes | | 76,724 | 14.15 |
| Total votes | | 542,070 | 100.00 |
| Lakas–Kampi hold | | | |

== Congressional elections ==
Each of Tarlac's three legislative districts elected a representative to the House of Representatives. The candidate with the highest number of votes won the seat.

=== 1st District ===
Incumbent Monica Prieto-Teodoro (Lakas-Kampi-CMD), wife of presidential candidate Gilberto Teodoro, quit politics to support her husband's bid for presidency. Representative Teodoro had succeeded her husband as representative from the 1st district and defeated her cousin China Cojuangco in 2007. Lakas Kampi CMD did not name a candidate in this district.

Philippine House of Representatives election at Tarlac's 1st district
| Party | Candidate | Votes | % |
|---|---|---|---|
| NPC | Enrique Cojuangco | 149,520 | 94.97 |
| PGRP | Efren Dancel Inocencio | 7,918 | 5.03 |
| Valid ballots | | 157,438 | 85.50 |
| Invalid or blank votes | | 26,694 | 14.50 |
| Total votes | | 184,132 | 100.00 |
| NPC gain from Lakas–Kampi | | | |

=== 2nd District ===
Incumbent Jose Villa Agustin Yap (Lakas Kampi CMD), who was supposed to run again for re-election, died on March 2, 2010. As a result, his daughter Susan Yap-Sulit ran in his place. The name of Jose Yap remained on the ballot and his votes went to Susan Yap.

Philippine House of Representatives election at Tarlac's 2nd district
| Party | Candidate | Votes | % |
|---|---|---|---|
| Lakas–Kampi | Susan Yap-Sulit | 124,190 | 63.78 |
| Liberal | Genaro Malvar Mendoza | 70,522 | 36.22 |
| Valid ballots | | 194,712 | 95.52 |
| Invalid or blank votes | | 9,139 | 4.48 |
| Total votes | | 203,851 | 100.00 |
| Lakas–Kampi hold | | | |

=== 3rd District ===
Jeci Aquino Lapus was the incumbent.

Philippine House of Representatives election at Tarlac's 3rd district
| Party | Candidate | Votes | % |
|---|---|---|---|
| Lakas–Kampi | Jeci Aquino Lapus | 82,093 | 55.43 |
| Liberal | Reynaldo Lopez Catacutan | 65,997 | 44.57 |
| Valid ballots | | 148,090 | 96.11 |
| Invalid or blank votes | | 5,997 | 3.89 |
| Total votes | | 154,087 | 100.00 |
| Lakas–Kampi hold | | | |

== Provincial Board elections ==
All three Districts of Tarlac elected Sangguniang Panlalawigan, or provincial board members. Election is via plurality-at-large voting. The total votes are the actual number of voters who voted, not the total votes of all candidates

| Party | Votes | % | Seats |
|---|---|---|---|
| Nationalist People's Coalition | 504,327 | 41.15 | 4 |
| Lakas Kampi CMD | 397,016 | 32.39 | 3 |
| Liberal Party | 238,933 | 19.49 | 2 |
| Nacionalista Party | 54,695 | 4.46 | 1 |
| PDP–Laban | 30,736 | 2.51 | 0 |
| Ex officio seats | | | 3 |
| Total | 1,225,707 | 100.00 | 13 |
| Total votes | 387,983 | – | |

=== 1st District ===
- Municipalities: Anao, Camiling, Mayantoc, Moncada, Paniqui, Pura, Ramos, San Clemente, San Manuel, Santa Ignacia

Tarlac 1st District Sangguniang Panlalawigan election
| Party | Candidate | Votes | % |
|---|---|---|---|
| NPC | Tito Razalan | 80,900 | 43.94 |
| Lakas–Kampi | Rommel Dela Cruz | 78,342 | 42.55 |
| NPC | Noel Dela Cruz | 56,962 | 30.94 |
| Lakas–Kampi | Rey Christopher Fajardo | 55,185 | 29.97 |
| Lakas–Kampi | Rodolfo Guerrero | 40,858 | 22.19 |
| NPC | Mario Maddela | 35,917 | 19.51 |
| PDP–Laban | Deoval Lopez | 30,736 | 16.69 |
| Total votes | | 184,132 | 100.00 |

=== 2nd District ===
- City: Tarlac City
- Municipalities: Gerona, Victoria, San Jose

Tarlac 2nd District Sangguniang Panlalawigan election
| Party | Candidate | Votes | % |
|---|---|---|---|
| NPC | Harmes Sembrano | 100,256 | 49.18 |
| Liberal | Antonio Cervantes | 89,934 | 44.12 |
| Liberal | Enrico De Leon | 85,777 | 42.08 |
| Lakas–Kampi | Danilo Asiaten | 59,550 | 29.21 |
| Lakas–Kampi | Tyrone Aganon | 49,189 | 24.13 |
| NPC | Godofredo Sabado | 48,078 | 23.58 |
| NPC | Bienvenido Buan Jr. | 47,263 | 23.19 |
| Lakas–Kampi | Arlan Fajardo | 31,538 | 15.47 |
| NPC | Jesus Concepcion | 12,827 | 6.29 |
| Total votes | | 203,851 | 100.00 |

=== 3rd District ===
- Municipalities: Bamban, Capas, Concepcion, La Paz

Tarlac 3rd District Sangguniang Panlalawigan election
| Party | Candidate | Votes | % |
|---|---|---|---|
| NPC | Danilo David | 57,754 | 37.48 |
| Nacionalista | Henry David | 54,695 | 35.50 |
| Lakas–Kampi | George Feliciano | 37,302 | 24.21 |
| NPC | Rolando Pineda | 32,345 | 20.99 |
| NPC | Rainer Pineda | 32,025 | 20.78 |
| Lakas–Kampi | Arnaldo Dizon | 27,350 | 17.75 |
| Liberal | Arnel Dizon | 21,928 | 14.23 |
| Liberal | Enrique Quizon | 20,866 | 13.54 |
| Liberal | Raul Narciso | 20,428 | 13.26 |
| Lakas–Kampi | Carlito Policarpio | 17,702 | 11.49 |
| Total votes | | 154,087 | 100.00 |
