= 2016 Tarlac local elections =

2016 Tarlac gubernatorial elections

2016 Tarlac gubernatorial elections
- May 9, 2016
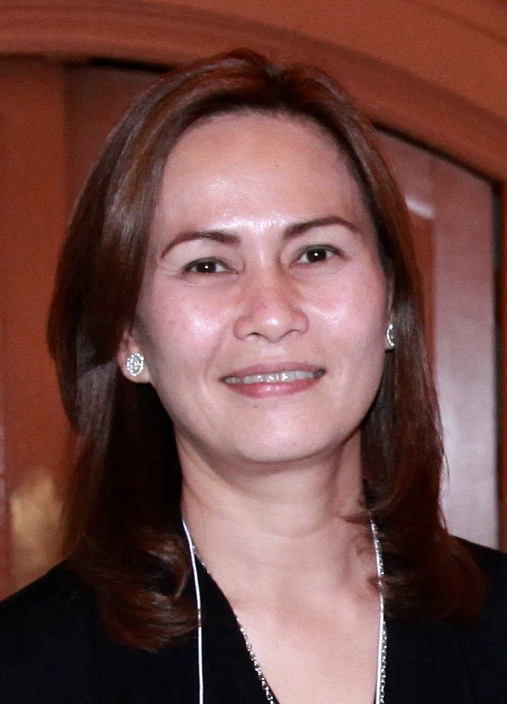
| Candidate | Susan Yap | Gelacio Manalang |
| Party | NPC | PMP |
| Running mate | Carlito David | Miguel Cojuangco-Rivilla |
| Popular vote | 355,493 | 199,480 |
| Percentage | 63.25 | 35.49 |
Governor before election
Victor Yap
NPC
Elected Governor
Susan Yap
NPC
- 2016 Tarlac vice gubernatorial elections
- May 9, 2016
| Candidate | Carlito David | Pearl Pacada | Miguel Cojuangco-Rivilla |
| Party | NPC | Lakas | PMP |
| Popular vote | 207,199 | 189,956 | 107,632 |
| Percentage | 41.05 | 37.63 | 21.32 |
Vice Governor before election
Enrique Cojuangco Jr.
NPC
Elected Vice Governor
Carlito David
NPC

The Province of Tarlac held its local elections on Monday, May 9, 2016, as a part of the 2016 Philippine general election. Voters selected candidates for all local positions: a town mayor, vice mayor and town councilors, as well as members of the Sangguniang Panlalawigan, the vice-governor, governor and representatives for the three districts of Tarlac. In the gubernatorial race, Tarlac's incumbent 2nd district Representative Susan Yap, sister of incumbent governor Victor Yap, defeated incumbent Tarlac City Mayor Gelacio Manalang.

In the vice gubernatorial race, incumbent 3rd district Board Member Carlito David narrowly defeated former Vice Governor Pearl Pacada as well as incumbent Paniqui Mayor Miguel Cojuangco-Rivilla.

== Provincial elections ==
The candidates for governor and vice governor with the highest number of votes wins the seat; they are voted separately, therefore, they may be of different parties when elected.

=== Gubernatorial election ===
Parties are as stated in their certificate of candidacies. Incumbent governor Victor Yap is term limited and is running for congressman of Tarlac's 2nd district. His sister, incumbent 2nd district congresswoman Susan Yap is running in his place.

Tarlac gubernatorial election
| Party | Candidate | Votes | % |
|---|---|---|---|
| NPC | Susan Yap | 355,493 | 63.25 |
| PMP | Gelacio Manalang | 199,480 | 35.49 |
| KBL | Bertito Del Mundo | 7,031 | 1.25 |
| Margin of victory | | 156,013 | 27.76 |
| Invalid or blank votes | | 66,728 | 10.61 |
| Total votes | | 628,732 | 100.00 |
| NPC hold | | | |

==== Results by city/municipality ====
| City/Municipality | Yap | Manalang | del Mundo |
|---|---|---|---|
| Anao | 2,980 | 2,438 | 35 |
| Bamban | 16,289 | 9,275 | 228 |
| Camiling | 21,795 | 12,066 | 319 |
| Capas | 25,315 | 18,417 | 343 |
| City of Tarlac | 87,172 | 54,609 | 2,189 |
| Concepcion | 41,010 | 22,516 | 895 |
| Gerona | 22,679 | 15,392 | 400 |
| La Paz | 18,248 | 7,899 | 489 |
| Mayantoc | 9,734 | 4,018 | 123 |
| Moncada | 18,374 | 6,314 | 410 |
| Paniqui | 24,820 | 16,731 | 455 |
| Pura | 6,351 | 5,321 | 101 |
| Ramos | 5,370 | 4,198 | 129 |
| San Clemente | 4,489 | 1,826 | 85 |
| San Jose | 10,770 | 1,955 | 43 |
| San Manuel | 7,226 | 3,647 | 160 |
| Santa Ignacia | 14,112 | 6,121 | 428 |
| Victoria | 18,759 | 6,737 | 199 |
| Total | 355,493 | 199,480 | 7,031 |
| City/Municipality | | | |
| City/Municipality | Yap | Manalang | del Mundo |

=== Vice-gubernatorial election ===
Tarlac vice-gubernatorial election
| Party | Candidate | Votes | % |
|---|---|---|---|
| NPC | Carlito David | 207,199 | 41.05 |
| Lakas | Pearl Pacada | 189,956 | 37.63 |
| PMP | Miguel Cojuangco-Rivilla | 107,632 | 21.32 |
| Margin of victory | | 17,243 | 3.42 |
| Invalid or blank votes | | 123,945 | 19.71 |
| Total votes | | 628,732 | 100.00 |
| NPC hold | | | |

==== Results by city/municipality ====
| City/Municipality | David | Pacada | Rivilla |
|---|---|---|---|
| Anao | 1,332 | 1,625 | 2,032 |
| Bamban | 11,563 | 9,239 | 2,665 |
| Camiling | 9,263 | 19,260 | 4,273 |
| Capas | 19,222 | 12,588 | 7,102 |
| City of Tarlac | 46,555 | 51,360 | 24,999 |
| Concepcion | 43,826 | 10,321 | 4,145 |
| Gerona | 10,852 | 13,352 | 8,754 |
| La Paz | 13,299 | 7,934 | 2,172 |
| Mayantoc | 3,315 | 7,587 | 1,805 |
| Moncada | 7,860 | 9,341 | 5,853 |
| Paniqui | 10,405 | 5,588 | 26,670 |
| Pura | 2,860 | 5,060 | 2,867 |
| Ramos | 1,687 | 2,820 | 4,723 |
| San Clemente | 2,054 | 4,832 | 179 |
| San Jose | 6,063 | 3,272 | 1,369 |
| San Manuel | 3,627 | 4,383 | 1,892 |
| Santa Ignacia | 5,193 | 11,042 | 3,192 |
| Victoria | 8,233 | 10,352 | 2,940 |
| Total | 207,199 | 189,956 | 107,632 |
| City/Municipality | | | |
| City/Municipality | David | Pacada | Rivilla |

== Congressional elections ==
Each of Tarlac's three legislative districts will elect each representative to the House of Representatives. The candidate with the highest number of votes wins the seat.

=== 1st District ===
- Municipalities: Anao, Camiling, Mayantoc, Moncada, Paniqui, Pura, Ramos, San Clemente, San Manuel, Santa Ignacia

2016 Philippine House of Representatives election in Tarlac's 1st District.
| Party | Candidate | Votes | % |
|---|---|---|---|
| NPC | Charlie Cojuangco | 151,199 | 95.06 |
| Independent | Cristino Diamsay | 7,859 | 4.94 |
| Invalid or blank votes | | 49,331 | 23.67 |
| Total votes | | 208,389 | 100.00 |
| NPC hold | | | |

=== 2nd District ===
- City: Tarlac City
- Municipalities: Gerona, Victoria, San Jose

Parties are as stated in their certificate of candidacies. Incumbent governor Victor Yap is term limited and is running for congressman of Tarlac's 2nd district. His sister, incumbent 2nd district congresswoman Susan Yap is running in his place.

2016 Philippine House of Representatives election in Tarlac's 2nd District.
| Party | Candidate | Votes | % |
|---|---|---|---|
| NPC | Victor Yap | 165,982 | 79.72 |
| PMP | Florentino Galang | 40,685 | 19.54 |
| Independent | Joseph Doloricon | 1,543 | 0.74 |
| Invalid or blank votes | | 33,056 | 13.70 |
| Total votes | | 241,266 | 100.00 |
| NPC hold | | | |

=== 3rd District ===
- Municipalities: Bamban, Capas, Concepcion, La Paz

Noel Villanueva is the incumbent. He changed his party affiliation from Nacionalista to NPC.

2016 Philippine House of Representatives election at Tarlac's 3rd district
| Party | Candidate | Votes | % |
|---|---|---|---|
| NPC | Noel Villanueva | 130,611 | 100.00 |
| Invalid or blank votes | | 48,476 | 27.07 |
| Total votes | | 179,087 | 100.00 |
| NPC hold | | | |

== Provincial Board elections ==
All 3 Districts of Tarlac will elect Sangguniang Panlalawigan or provincial board members. Election is via plurality-at-large voting. The total votes are the actual number of voters who voted, not the total votes of all candidates

| Party | Total votes | | Total seats | |
| Party | Total | % | Total | % |
|---|---|---|---|---|
| NPC | 636,523 | 49.04% | 6 | 46.2% |
| Independent | 264,356 | 20.37% | 1 | 7.7% |
| Liberal | 200,123 | 15.42% | 2 | 15.4% |
| Nacionalista | 124,963 | 9.63% | 1 | 7.7% |
| UNA | 71,895 | 5.54% | 0 | 0.0% |
| Total valid votes cast | 1,297,860 | N/A | | |
| Total turnout | 628,732 | 100.00% | | |
| Total partisan seats | | | 10 | 77.00% |
| Seat for Association of Barangay Captains President | | | 1 | 7.7% |
| Seat for Association of Sangguniang Kabataan chairmen President | | | 1 | 7.7% |
| Seat for Philippine Councilors League - Provincial Chapter President | | | 1 | 7.7% |
| Total non-partisan seats | | | 3 | 23.00% |
| Total seats | | | 13 | 100.0% |

=== 1st District ===
- Municipalities: Anao, Camiling, Mayantoc, Moncada, Paniqui, Pura, Ramos, San Clemente, San Manuel, Santa Ignacia

Tarlac 1st District Sangguniang Panlalawigan election
| Party | Candidate | Votes | % |
|---|---|---|---|
| NPC | Jessie Aquino | 99,175 | 47.59 |
| NPC | Romeo Evangelista | 93,412 | 44.83 |
| NPC | John Patrick Agustin | 79,462 | 38.13 |
| Independent | Bogs Aganon | 77,993 | 37.43 |
| Total votes | | 208,389 | 100.00 |

=== 2nd District ===
- City: Tarlac City
- Municipalities: Gerona, Victoria, San Jose

Tarlac 2nd District Sangguniang Panlalawigan election
| Party | Candidate | Votes | % |
|---|---|---|---|
| Nacionalista | Harmes Sembrano | 124,963 | 51.79 |
| Liberal | Henry de Leon | 106,310 | 44.06 |
| Independent | Joji David | 99,949 | 41.43 |
| Liberal | Tonyboy Cervantes | 93,793 | 38.88 |
| NPC | Emy Ladera-Facunla | 75,928 | 31.47 |
| UNA | Danilo Asiaten | 71,895 | 29.80 |
| NPC | Bert Magcalas | 31,659 | 13.12 |
| Independent | Lita Briones | 23,619 | 9.79 |
| Total votes | | 241,266 | 100.00 |

=== 3rd District ===
- Municipalities: Bamban, Capas, Concepcion, La Paz

Tarlac 3rd District Sangguniang Panlalawigan election
| Party | Candidate | Votes | % |
|---|---|---|---|
| NPC | Tootsie Cruz | 93,791 | 52.37 |
| NPC | Vernon Villanueva | 83,311 | 46.52 |
| NPC | Boy Mandal | 79,785 | 44.55 |
| Independent | Jay Castro | 62,795 | 35.06 |
| Total votes | | 179,087 | 100.00 |
