= 2019 Tarlac local elections =

2019 Tarlac gubernatorial election
- May 13, 2019
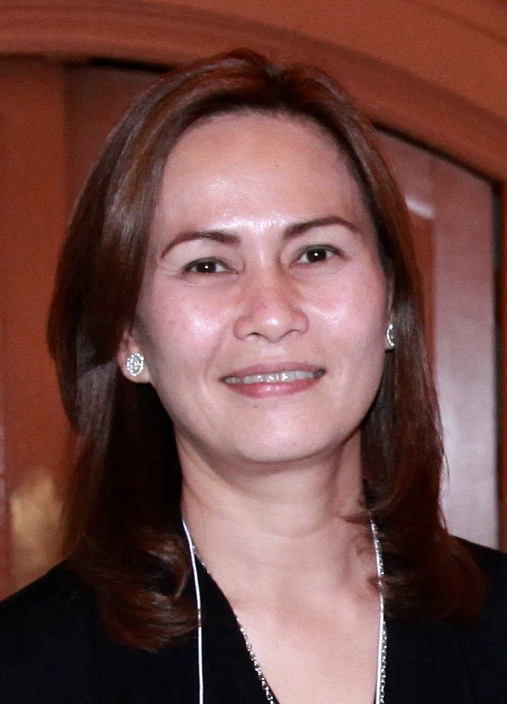
Nominee	Susan Yap	N/A
Party	NPC	Lakas
Running mate	Carlito David	Pearl Pacada
Popular vote	534,122	199,480 (for vice governor)
Percentage	100.00	35.49 (for vice-governor)
Governor before election
Susan Yap
NPC
Elected Governor
Susan Yap
NPC

The Province of Tarlac held its local elections on Monday, May 13, 2019, as a part of the 2019 Philippine general election. Voters selected candidates for all local positions: a town mayor, vice mayor and town councilors, as well as members of the Sangguniang Panlalawigan, the vice-governor, governor and representatives for the three districts of Tarlac. In the gubernatorial race, Tarlac's incumbent Governor Susan Yap ran unopposed for Governor while incumbent Vice-Governor Carlito David defeated former Vice-Governor Pearl Pacada in a rematch of the 2016 elections.

== Provincial elections ==
The candidates for governor and vice governor with the highest number of votes wins the seat; they are voted separately, therefore, they may be of different parties when elected.

=== Gubernatorial election ===
Parties are as stated in their certificate of candidacies. Incumbent governor Susan Yap ran unopposed.

Tarlac gubernatorial election
Party	Candidate	Votes	%
NPC	Susan Yap	534,122	100.00
Valid ballots		534,122	79.29
Invalid or blank votes		139,491	20.71
Total votes		628,732	100.00
NPC hold			

==== Results by city/municipality ====
City/Municipality	Yap	
City/Municipality	Votes	%
Anao	5,061	100.00
Bamban	24,090	100.00
Camiling	32,650	100.00
Capas	44,896	100.00
City of Tarlac	138,418	100.00
Concepcion	54,118	100.00
Gerona	36,600	100.00
La Paz	25,524	100.00
Mayantoc	13,242	100.00
Paniqui	38,450	100.00
Pura	10,190	100.00
Ramos	9,035	100.00
San Clemente	5,867	100.00
San Jose	13,006	100.00
San Manuel	10,097	100.00
Santa Ignacia	20,317	100.00
Victoria	26,862	100.00
TOTAL	534,122	100.00

=== Vice-gubernatorial election ===
Tarlac vice-gubernatorial election
Party	Candidate	Votes	%
NPC	Carlito David	299,924	55.64
Lakas	Pearl Pacada	239,140	44.36
Margin of victory		60,784	11.28
Valid ballots		539,064	80.03
Invalid or blank votes		134,549	19.97
Total votes		673,613	100.00
NPC hold			

==== Results by city/municipality ====
City/Municipality	David		Pacada	
City/Municipality	Votes	%	Votes	%
Anao	2,794	53.30	2,448	46.70
Bamban	15,610	61.49	9,775	38.51
Camiling	12,881	36.42	22,488	63.58
Capas	29,903	65.87	15,493	34.13
City of Tarlac	74,355	56.82	56,512	43.18
Concepcion	38,841	57.87	28,273	42.13
Gerona	18,054	52.22	16,518	47.78
La Paz	17,093	64.39	9,452	35.61
Mayantoc	6,067	45.51	7,265	54.49
Paniqui	22,988	60.96	14,724	39.04
Pura	4,762	45.02	5,816	54.98
Ramos	4,188	45.52	5,013	54.48
San Clemente	2,312	32.02	4,909	67.98
San Jose	7,042	59.80	4,734	40.20
San Manuel	4,774	48.69	5,031	51.31
Santa Ignacia	9,918	48.47	10,546	51.53
Victoria	14,781	60.97	9,464	39.03
TOTAL	299,924	55.64	239,140	44.36

== Congressional elections ==
Each of Tarlac's three legislative districts will elect each representative to the House of Representatives. The candidate with the highest number of votes wins the seat.

=== 1st District ===
- Municipalities: Anao, Camiling, Mayantoc, Moncada, Paniqui, Pura, Ramos, San Clemente, San Manuel, Santa Ignacia

Incumbent Representative Charlie Cojuangco is running unopposed.

2019 Philippine House of Representatives election in Tarlac's 1st District.
Party	Candidate	Votes	%
NPC	Charlie Cojuangco	157,788	100.00
Valid ballots		157,788	73.13
Invalid or blank votes		57,976	26.87
Total votes		215,764	100.00
NPC hold			

=== 2nd District ===
- City: Tarlac City
- Municipalities: Gerona, Victoria, San Jose

Parties are as stated in their certificate of candidacies. Victor Yap is the incumbent.

2019 Philippine House of Representatives election in Tarlac's 2nd District.
Party	Candidate	Votes	%
NPC	Victor Yap	211,834	94.66
Independent	Jorge delos Reyes	11,949	5.34
Valid ballots		223,783	88.19
Invalid or blank votes		29,971	11.81
Total votes		253,754	100.00
NPC hold			

=== 3rd District ===
- Municipalities: Bamban, Capas, Concepcion, La Paz

Noel Villanueva is the incumbent.

2019 Philippine House of Representatives election at Tarlac's 3rd district
Party	Candidate	Votes	%
NPC	Noel Villanueva	135,449	73.97
Independent	Hariking David	44,678	24.40
Independent	Bertito del Mundo	2,991	1.63
Valid ballots		183,118	89.72
Invalid or blank votes		20,997	10.28
Total votes		204,095	100.00
NPC hold			

== Provincial Board elections ==
All three Districts of Tarlac elected Sangguniang Panlalawigan, or provincial board members. Election is via plurality-at-large voting. The total votes are the actual number of voters who voted, not the total votes of all candidates

Party	Total votes		Total seats	
Party	Total	%	Total	%
NPC	976,287	65.84%	9	69.3%
Independent	285,195	19.23%	1	7.7%
PDP–Laban	122,181	8.24%	0	0.0%
Liberal	99,264	6.69%	0	0.0%
Total valid votes cast	1,482,927	N/A		
Total turnout	673,613	100.00%		
Total partisan seats			10	77.0%
Seat for Association of Barangay Captains President			1	7.7%
Seat for Association of Sangguniang Kabataan chairmen President			1	7.7%
Seat for Philippine Councilors League - Provincial Chapter President			1	7.7%
Total non-partisan seats			3	23.0%
Total seats			13	100.00%

=== 1st District ===
- Municipalities: Anao, Camiling, Mayantoc, Moncada, Paniqui, Pura, Ramos, San Clemente, San Manuel, Santa Ignacia

Tarlac 1st District Sangguniang Panlalawigan election
Party	Candidate	Votes	%
NPC	Romeo Evangelista	131,119	60.77
NPC	Jessie Aquino	119,056	55.18
NPC	Joy Gilbert Lamorena	104,589	48.47
PDP–Laban	Marty Franz Toralba	38,263	17.73
Total votes		215,764	100.00

=== 2nd District ===
- City: Tarlac City
- Municipalities: Gerona, Victoria, San Jose

Tarlac 2nd District Sangguniang Panlalawigan election
Party	Candidate	Votes	%
Independent	Danilo Asiaten	118,743	46.79
NPC	Joji David	118,086	46.54
NPC	Tonyboy Cervantes	112,496	44.33
NPC	Dennis Go	111,761	44.04
Liberal	Jelo Honrado	99,264	39.12
PDP–Laban	Glenn Troy Caritativo	65,120	25.66
Independent	Tyrone Aganon	28,628	11.28
PDP–Laban	Malou Malvar	18,798	7.41
Independent	Jess Martinez	17,532	6.91
Total votes		253,754	100.00

=== 3rd District ===
- Municipalities: Bamban, Capas, Concepcion, La Paz

Tarlac 3rd District Sangguniang Panlalawigan election
Party	Candidate	Votes	%
NPC	Vernon Villanueva	96,825	47.44
NPC	Boy Mandal	95,097	46.59
NPC	Danilo David	87,258	42.75
Independent	Jimmy Dimatulac	48,410	23.72
Independent	Frank Quiambao	36,971	18.11
Independent	Daisy Francia	34,911	17.11
Total votes		204.095	100.00
