= Governor of Tarlac =

Local chief executive

- Gobernador ng Lalawigan ng Tarlac
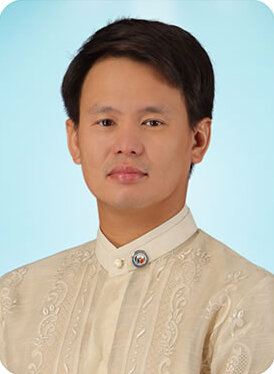
- Incumbent; Christian Yap since June 30, 2025
- Style: The Honorable
- Seat: Tarlac Provincial Capitol
- Appointer: Elected via popular vote
- Term length: 3 years
- Inaugural holder: Francisco Makabulos
- Formation: 1898
- Deputy: Vice Governor

The governor of Tarlac (Filipino: Punong Panlalawigan ng Tarlac), is the chief executive of the provincial government of Tarlac.

== List of governors of Tarlac (1898–present) ==
No.	Image	Governor	Term
1		Francisco Makabulos	1898–1900
2		Alfonso Ramos	1901–1904
3		Manuel de Leon	1904–1907
4		Jose Espinosa Jr.	1907–1910
5		Gregorio Romulo	1910–1914
6		Ernesto Gardiner	1914–1919
7		Luís Morales	1922–1925
8		Manuel de Leon	1925-1928
9		Marcelino Agana	1928–1931
10		Jose Urquico	1931–1937
11		Alfonso Pablo	1927–1940
12		Eduardo Cojuangco Sr.	1941
13		Sergio Aquino	1942–1944
14		Feliciano Gardiner	1944
15		Alejandro Galang	1945–1946
16		Antonio Lopez	1946–1953
17		Arsenio H. Lugay	1954–1961
18		Benigno Aquino Jr.	1963–1967
19		Lazaro Domingo	1967
20		Eduardo Cojuangco Jr.	1967–1969
21		Jose Macapinlac	1969–1971
22		Eliodoro Castro	1971–1979
23		Homobono Sawit	1979–1984
24		Federico Peralta	1984–1986
25		Candido Guiam	1986–1987
26		Florendo Sangalang	1987–1988
27		Carlos Kipping	1988
28		Mariano Un Ocampo III	1988–1992
29		Margarita Cojuangco	1992–1998
30		Jose V. Yap Sr.	1998–2007
31		Victor A. Yap	2007–2016
32		Susan Yap-Sulit	2016–2025
33		Christian Yap	2025–present

== Elections ==
- 2001 Tarlac local elections
- 2004 Tarlac local elections
- 2007 Tarlac local elections
- 2010 Tarlac local elections
- 2013 Tarlac local elections
- 2016 Tarlac local elections
- 2019 Tarlac local elections
- 2022 Tarlac local elections
- 2025 Tarlac local elections
