= Susan Yap =

Filipino politician (born 1964)

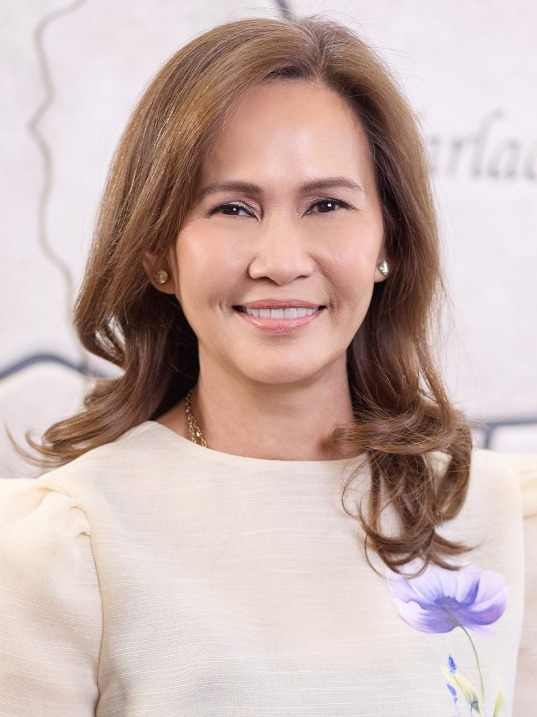
- Official portrait, 2025

Mayor of Tarlac City
- Incumbent
- Assumed office June 30, 2025
- Vice Mayor: Katrina Theresa Angeles
- Preceded by: Maria Cristina Angeles

32nd Governor of Tarlac
- In office June 30, 2016 – June 30, 2025
- Vice Governor: Carlito S. David
- Preceded by: Victor Yap
- Succeeded by: Christian Tell Yap

Member of the Philippine House of Representatives from Tarlac's 2nd District
- In office June 30, 2010 – June 30, 2016
- Preceded by: Jose V. Yap Sr.
- Succeeded by: Victor Yap

Personal details
- Born: Susan Areno Yap; November 3, 1964 (age 61) Quezon City, Philippines
- Party: NPC (2010–present)
- Other political affiliations: Lakas (2009–2010)
- Relations: Jose Yap Sr. (father); Victor Yap (brother); Jose "Penggoy” Yap Jr. (brother); Rolando Macasaet (brother-in-law); Emilio Yap Macasaet (nephew)
- Children: 5, including Christian
- Education: University of the Philippines Diliman (AB Linguistics); Ateneo de Manila University (Business Management); Asian Institute of Management (Finance and Condominium Management)
- Occupation: Politician

Susan Areno Yap-Sulit (born November 3, 1964) is a Filipino politician. She is currently serving as Mayor of Tarlac City since 2025. She served as the 32nd Governor of Tarlac from 2016 to 2025. She previously represented the 2nd district of Tarlac in the Philippine House of Representatives from 2010 to 2016. Yap is a member of the NPC, the older sister of former governor Victor Yap and the daughter of former governor Jose “Aping” Yap Sr.

== Early life and education ==
Susan Areno Yap was born on November 3, 1964, in Quezon City to Jose Yap Sr. and Zenaida Areno. She was raised in San Jose, Tarlac. She studied University of the Philippines Diliman with the degree of Bachelor of Arts in linguistics. Yap continued her studies at the Ateneo de Manila University where she obtained a degree of Business Management.

Yap attended the Asian Institute of Management where she finished the course of Finance and Condominium Management.

== Political career ==
=== House of Representatives (2010–2016) ===
Yap began her political career in 2010, following the death of her father. She was elected to represent the 2nd district of Tarlac in the Philippine House of Representatives, serving until 2016. During her tenure, she focused on legislative initiatives aimed at improving healthcare, education, and infrastructure in her district.

=== Governor of Tarlac (2016–2025) ===
In 2016, Yap was elected as the governor of Tarlac, succeeding her brother, Victor Yap. She was re-elected in 2019 and 2022.

=== Mayor of Tarlac City (2025–present) ===
In 2025, Yap became a mayor of Tarlac City after she beat Victor Angeles, the husband of Cristy Angeles over 3,536 votes.

== Personal life ==
She is the daughter of former governor and former congressman Jose “Aping” Yap Sr. and comes from a prominent political family in Tarlac. Her brothers include Victor Yap, a former governor and former congressman, and Jose Yap Jr., a former mayor of San Jose.

== Electoral history ==
Electoral history of Susan Yap
Year	Office	Party	Votes received				Result
Year	Office	Party	Total	%	P.	Swing	Result
2010	Representative (Tarlac–2nd)	Lakas–Kampi	124,190	63.78%	1st	—N/a	Won
2013	Representative (Tarlac–2nd)	NPC	121,341	68.04%	1st	—N/a	Won
2016	Governor of Tarlac	NPC	355,493	63.25%	1st	—N/a	Won
2019	Governor of Tarlac	NPC	534,122	100.00%	1st	—N/a	Unopposed
2022	Governor of Tarlac	NPC	600,355	100.00%	1st	—N/a	Unopposed
2025	Mayor of Tarlac City	NPC	101,067	44.08%	1st	—N/a	Won
