= Legislative districts of Tarlac =

Legislative district of the Philippines

The legislative districts of Tarlac are the representations of the province of Tarlac in the various national legislatures of the Philippines. The province is currently represented in the lower house of the Congress of the Philippines through its first, second, and third congressional districts.

== History ==
The province was divided into two legislative districts until 1972. It was part of the representation of Region III from 1978 to 1984, and from 1984 to 1986 it elected two assemblymen at-large. In 1986, it was redistricted into three legislative districts.

== Current districts ==
Legislative districts and representatives of Tarlac
District	Current Representative		Party	Constituent LGUs	Population (2020)	Area	Map
District	Image	Name	Party	Constituent LGUs	Population (2020)	Area	Map
1st		Jaime Cojuangco (since 2022); Paniqui	NPC	List: Anao; Camiling; Mayantoc; Moncada; Paniqui; Pura; Ramos; San Clemente; San Manuel; Santa Ignacia	439,800	960.04 km²	Map
2nd		Maria Cristina Angeles (since 2025); Tarlac City	PFP	List: Gerona; San Jose; Tarlac City; Victoria	590,435	1,107.87 km²	Map
3rd		Noel Rivera (since 2022); Concepcion	NPC	List: Bamban; Capas; Concepcion; La Paz	473,221	985.69 km²	Map

== At-large (defunct) ==
=== 1943–1944 ===
Period	Representative
National Assembly; 1943–1944	Benigno Simeon Aquino, Sr.
National Assembly; 1943–1944	Sergio L. Aquino

=== 1984–1986 ===
Period	Representative
Regular Batasang Pambansa; 1984–1986	Homobono C. Sawit
Regular Batasang Pambansa; 1984–1986	Mercedes C. Teodoro
