= Monasterio de Tarlac =

Catholic monastery in Zambales, Philippines

- Location within Luzon Location within Philippines

Religion
- Affiliation: Roman Catholic

Location
- Location: Mount Resurrection Eco Park, San Jose, Tarlac
- Country: Philippines
- Interactive map of Monasterio de Tarlac
- Coordinates: 15°26′11.7″N 120°25′52.3″E

Architecture
- Established: March 7, 2001

The Monasterio de Tarlac is a Catholic monastery on top of Mount Resurrection, part of the Zambales Mountain Range on the island of Luzon in the Philippines. It is part of the Mount Resurrection Eco Park in Barangay Lubigan, San José, Tarlac. It houses a relic believed to be a fragment of the True Cross of Jesus.
