= Tingting Cojuangco =

Filipina politician, philanthropist, and socialite

The Honorable Margarita “Tingting” R. Cojuangco
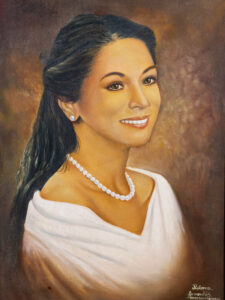

29th Governor of Tarlac
- In office June 30, 1992 – June 30, 1998
- Vice Governor: Candido Guiam
- Preceded by: Mariano Ocampo III
- Succeeded by: Jose V. Yap Sr.

Personal details
- Born: Margarita Manzano de los Reyes; April 29, 1944 (age 82) Quezon City, Republic of the Philippines
- Party: UNA (2012–present)
- Other political affiliations: Lakas (2008–2012); KAMPI (1997–2008); PDP–Laban (1992–1997)
- Spouse: Peping Cojuangco (m. 1962)
- Relations: Robert Jaworski Jr. (son-in-law)
- Children: 5, including Mikee
- Relatives: Cojuangco family (by marriage); Edu Manzano (cousin); Luis Manzano
- Profession: Public servant

Military service
- Allegiance: Republic of the Philippines
- Branch/service: Philippine Army
- Years of service: 1989 - Present
- Rank: Colonel

Margarita "Tingting" Manzano de los Reyes-Cojuangco (born April 29, 1944) is a Filipina politician, philanthropist and socialite. She was the former chairman of the Kabalikat ng Malayang Pilipino (Kampi) party and a member of the Council of Philippine Affairs (COPA). She was a candidate for a seat in the Senate in the 2013 Philippine Senate Election. Cojuangco lost in the election. She is the aunt of former Philippine President Benigno Aquino III.

== Early life and education ==
Cojuangco was born on April 29, 1944, to Geronimo delos Reyes and Lita Manzano. Cojuangco studied at the University of Santo Tomas, finished her master's degree in National Security Administration (MNSA) at the National Defense College, and holds doctorate degrees in Criminology and Philippine History.

In 1962, she married José Cojuangco, Jr.. Their marriage produced 5 daughters, the third of whom is actress and equestrienne Mikaela "Mikee" Cojuangco, who is married to Robert Jaworski Jr.. Her other children are Luisita or "Liaa" C. Bautista who is a pediatrician, Josephine "Pin" C. Guingona, Margarita Demetria "Maimai" C. Zini, and Regina Patricia Jose "China" C. Gonzalez.

== Career ==
She served as Tarlac Provincial Governor for two terms in 1992 until 1998. In 1998, she ran for re-election for a third and final term but lost. She tried to reclaim her old post in 2001 but lost again.

She is the president of the Philippine Public Safety College. She served as a presidential assistant to Gloria Macapagal Arroyo (2001-2004); Undersecretary for Special Concerns of the Department of the Interior and Local Government (March 10 – September 24, 2004); and is a full colonel in the Reserve Forces of the Philippine Army (1989–present); and columnist of the Philippine Star (1999–present).

She participated in the peace talks with the Moro National Liberation Front (MNLF).

In 2013, she ran unsuccessfully for Senate spot under the opposition group of then-Vice President Jejomar Binay.

== Awards ==
- Part of the Philippine Tatler's Who's Who of the Philippines, 2009
- One of Harper's Bazaar's 100 Most Beautiful Women in the World, 1968
