= Jose Yap =

Filipino lawyer and politician (1929-2010)

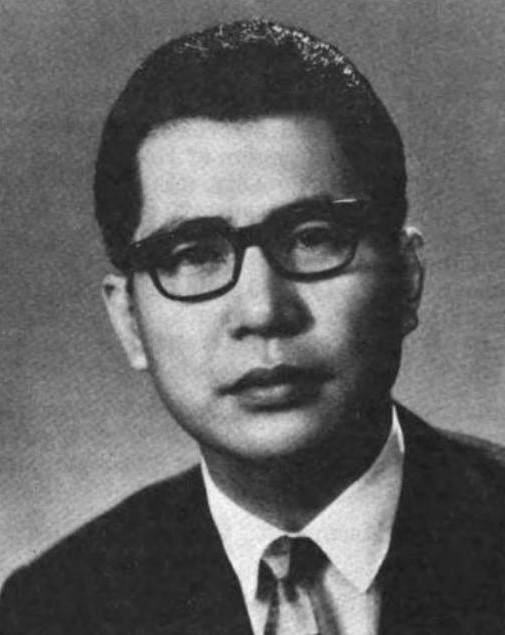
- Official portrait during the 6th Congress

Member of the House of Representatives from Tarlac’s 2nd district
- In office June 30, 2007 – March 10, 2010
- Preceded by: Benigno Aquino III
- Succeeded by: Susan Yap
- In office June 30, 1987 – June 30, 1998
- Preceded by: Himself
- Succeeded by: Benigno Aquino III
- In office December 30, 1965 – September 23, 1972
- Preceded by: Constancio Castañeda
- Succeeded by: Post abolished

30th Governor of Tarlac
- In office June 30, 1998 – June 30, 2007
- Vice Governor: Herminio Aquino (1998–2001); Marcelino Aganon Jr. (2001–2007)
- Preceded by: Tingting Cojuangco
- Succeeded by: Victor Yap

Mayor of Victoria, Tarlac
- In office 1952–1955
- Preceded by: Felino Dela Merced
- Succeeded by: Manuel Gamalinda

Personal details
- Born: Jose Villa Agustin Yap; January 16, 1929 Victoria, Tarlac, Philippine Islands
- Died: March 1, 2010 (aged 81) Santa Cruz, Manila, Philippines
- Party: Lakas (1995–2001, 2007–2010)
- Other political affiliations: NPC (2001–2007); LDP (1992–1995); PDP–Laban (1987–1992); Liberal (1965–1987)
- Spouse: Zenaida Areno
- Children: 7, including Susan and Victor
- Relatives: Christian Yap (grandson); Emilio Yap Macasaet (grandson); Rolando Macasaet (son-in-law)
- Education: Far Eastern University (BA); Manuel L. Quezon University (LLB)
- Occupation: Lawyer, politician

Jose "Aping" Villa Agustin Yap Sr. (January 16, 1929 – March 1, 2010) was a Filipino lawyer and politician. He represented the 2nd district of Tarlac in the House of Representatives of the Philippines from 2007 to 2010, a position he previously held from 1987 to 1998 and from 1965 to 1972. He served as 30th governor of Tarlac from 1998 to 2007. He also served as the mayor of Victoria, Tarlac from 1952 to 1955.

== Early life and education ==
Yap was born on January 16, 1929 in Victoria, Tarlac to Apolinario Yap and Sabina Villa Agustin. He studied Gabaldon Elementary School for his primary education. He studied Tarlac High School for his secondary education. Yap earned his Bachelor of Arts in Far Eastern University. He studied law at the Manuel L. Quezon University where he graduated in 1951. Yap passed the bar examination in 1952.

== Political career ==
Yap entered politics when he was became a mayor of Victoria, Tarlac from 1952 to 1955.

In 1965, Yap was elected as representative for the second district of Tarlac until 1972.

In 1987, Yap returned as representative for the second district of Tarlac where he served for three consecutive terms.

In 1998, Yap elected as governor of Tarlac where he served for three consecutive terms.

In 2007, Yap returned again as representative for the second district of Tarlac until his death in 2010.

== Personal life ==
Yap is married to Zenaida Areno and has seven children including Susan and Victor.

His grandson, Christian Yap, is the current governor of Tarlac since 2025 and representative for the second district of Tarlac from 2022 to 2025. His son-in-law is SSS-GSIS Partylist Representative Rolando Macasaet is married to his daughter Cristina Yap Macasaet and has a son Emilio "Mico" Yap Macasaet who is one of the Provincial Board Member of Tarlac.

== Death ==
On March 1, 2010, Yap died at the Chinese General Hospital and Medical Center in Santa Cruz, Manila.
