= Victor Yap =

Filipino politician

The Honorable Victor A. Yap
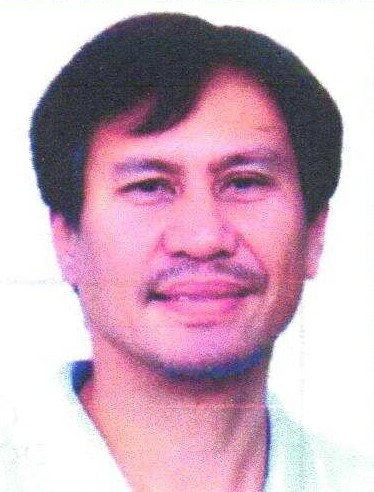
- Yap's certificate of candidacy photo in 2024

Member of the Philippine House of Representatives from the Tarlac's 2nd congressional district
- In office June 30, 2016 – June 30, 2022
- Preceded by: Susan Yap
- Succeeded by: Christian Yap

31st Governor of Tarlac
- In office June 30, 2007 – June 30, 2016
- Vice Governor: Marcelino Aganon Jr. (2007–2010); Pearl Pacada (2010–2013); Enrique Cojuangco Jr. (2013–2016)
- Preceded by: Jose V. Yap Sr.
- Succeeded by: Susan Yap

Vice Mayor of Victoria
- In office February 2, 1988 – June 30, 1998

Personal details
- Born: Victor Areno Yap; March 4, 1966 (age 60) Quezon City, Philippines
- Party: NPC (2007–present); SST (local party; 2024–present)
- Relations: Susan Yap (sister); Jose Yap Jr. (brother); Christian Yap (nephew); Rolando Macasaet (brother-in-law); Emilio Yap Macasaet (nephew)
- Parent: Jose Yap Sr. (father)
- Education: University of the Philippines

Victor Areno Yap (born March 4, 1966) is a Filipino politician who is recently served as a member of the House of Representatives of the Philippines, representing the 2nd district of Tarlac. He also sits as Chairman of the House Committee on Information and Communications Technology. He previously served as Governor of Tarlac from 2007 to 2016.

== Biography ==
=== Education ===
Yap studied at Ateneo de Manila University and University of the Philippines, obtaining a master’s degree in Strategic Studies.

=== Political career ===
Yap served as vice mayor of Victoria, Tarlac, from 1988 to 1998. In 1999, he was named to the board of directors of the Clark Development Corporation.

He was executive assistant to the governor of Tarlac from 2001, and was elected governor in 2007.

Yap is the son of former Governor Jose “Aping” Yap Sr. and brother of former Governor & current Tarlac City Mayor Susan Yap. He is a member of Upsilon Sigma Phi.
