= San Clemente, Tarlac =

Municipality in Tarlac, Philippines

San Clemente
- Municipality
- Municipality of San Clemente
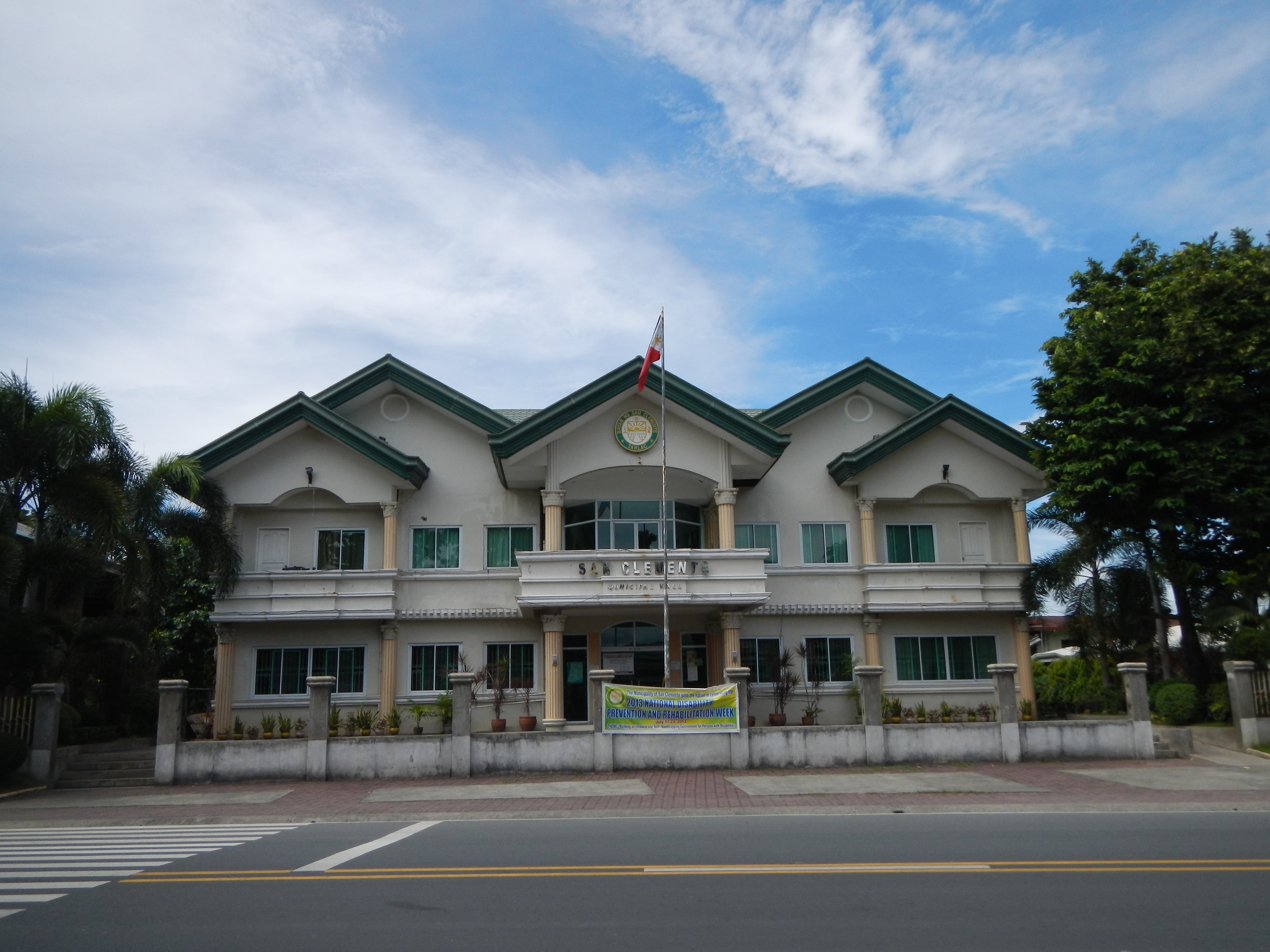
- Municipal Hall

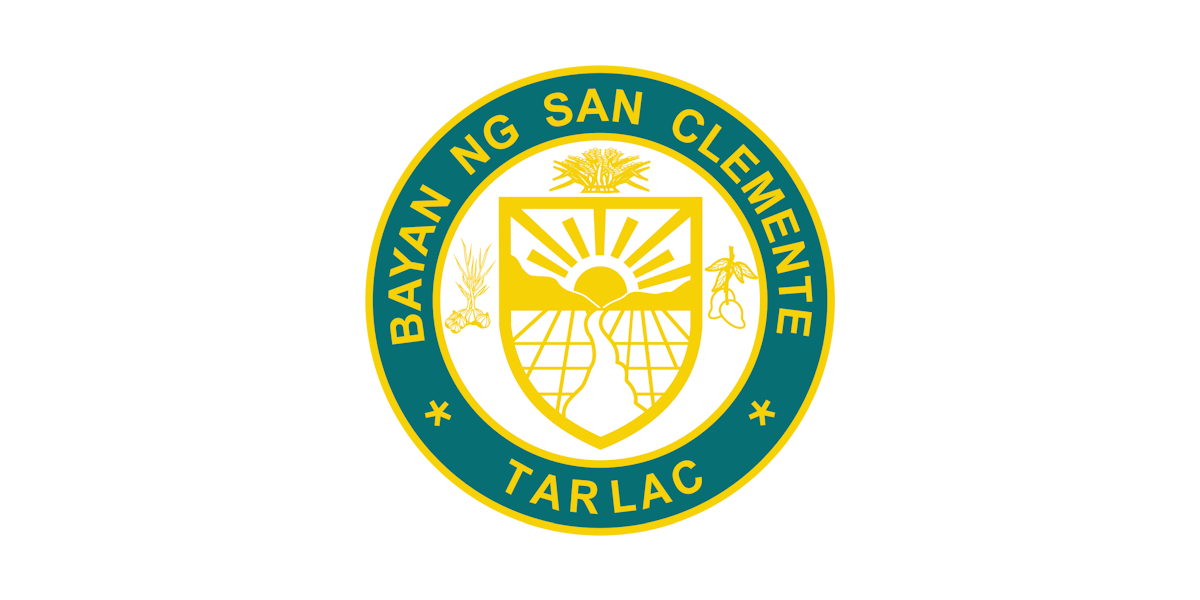
- Flag Seal

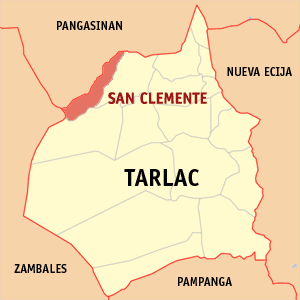
- Map of Tarlac with San Clemente highlighted
- Interactive map of San Clemente
- Location within the Philippines
- Coordinates: 15°42′43″N 120°21′37″E
- Country: Philippines
- Region: Central Luzon
- Province: Tarlac
- District: 1st district
- Founded: November 14, 1876
- Annexation to Camiling: 1898 or October 8, 1903
- Chartered: 1914
- Named for: Clement of Rome
- Barangays: 12 (see Barangays)

Government
  - Type: Sangguniang Bayan
  - Mayor: Roseller M. Toledo
  - Vice Mayor: Elma L. Macadamia
  - Representative: Jaime D. Cojuangco
  - Electorate: 9,884 voters (2025)

Area
  - Total: 49.73 km^{2} (19.20 sq mi)
- Elevation: 33 m (108 ft)
- Highest elevation: 289 m (948 ft)
- Lowest elevation: 10 m (33 ft)

Population (2024 census)
  - Total: 13,781
  - Density: 277.1/km^{2} (717.7/sq mi)
  - Households: 3,393

Economy
  - Income class: 4th municipal income class
  - Poverty incidence: 9.44% (2023)
  - Revenue: ₱ 103.5 million (2024)
  - Assets: ₱ 282.3 million (2024)
  - Expenditure: ₱ 92.95 million (2024)
  - Liabilities: ₱ 62.88 million (2024)

Service provider
  - Electricity: Tarlac 1 Electric Cooperative (TARELCO 1)
- Time zone: UTC+8 (PST)
- ZIP code: 2305
- PSGC: 0306913000
- IDD : area code: +63 (0)45
- Native languages: Pangasinan; Ilocano; Tagalog; Kapampangan

San Clemente, officially the Municipality of San Clemente (Pangasinan: Baley na San Clemente; Ilocano: Ili ti San Clemente; Tagalog: Bayan ng San Clemente), is a municipality in the province of Tarlac, Philippines. According to the 2024 census, it has a population of 13,781 people.

== History ==
San Clemente was created by virtue of a Royal Spanish Decree on November 14, 1876, during the Spanish colonial period of the Philippines. According to a local legend, it got its name in gratitude to Saint Clement of Rome, who miraculously appeared as a giant sword-wielding sentinel at the border bridge to scare away advancing bandits.

However, in 1898, when the Philippines was ceded to American rule, San Clemente was annexed to Camiling. This was officially enacted on October 8, 1903 through Act No. 930. It was later re-established in 1914 through Executive Order No. 131.

In 1948, Hukbalahap rebels under Commander Silvestre Liwanag (also known as "Linda Bie") first raided San Clemente, burning down the houses of Mayor Amado Roldan and the local detachment commander, which killed the mayor's child and wounded the mayor's wife. A second raid occurred during the town fiesta on April 22, 1951, causing several casualties until a military mortar tank arrived from Camiling and forced the rebels to retreat.

== Geography ==
San Clemente borders the provinces of Pangasinan to the north and northwest, and Zambales to the west. Like Santa Ignacia and Mayantoc, it was formerly a part of Camiling.

San Clemente is 42 kilometers (26 mi) from the provincial capital Tarlac City, 166 kilometers (103 mi) from Manila, and 7 kilometers (4.3 mi) from Camiling.

=== Barangays ===
San Clemente is politically subdivided into 12 barangays, as shown below. Each barangay consists of puroks and some have sitios.

- Balloc
- Bamban
- Casipo
- Catagudingan
- Daldalayap
- Doclong 1
- Doclong 2
- Maasin
- Nagsabaran
- Pit-ao
- Poblacion Norte
- Poblacion Sur

=== Climate ===
Climate data for San Clemente, Tarlac
Month	Jan	Feb	Mar	Apr	May	Jun	Jul	Aug	Sep	Oct	Nov	Dec	Year
Mean daily maximum °C (°F)	30 (86)	31 (88)	33 (91)	35 (95)	33 (91)	31 (88)	30 (86)	29 (84)	29 (84)	30 (86)	31 (88)	30 (86)	31 (88)
Mean daily minimum °C (°F)	19 (66)	19 (66)	20 (68)	22 (72)	24 (75)	24 (75)	24 (75)	24 (75)	23 (73)	22 (72)	21 (70)	20 (68)	22 (71)
Average precipitation mm (inches)	3 (0.1)	2 (0.1)	5 (0.2)	10 (0.4)	80 (3.1)	107 (4.2)	138 (5.4)	147 (5.8)	119 (4.7)	70 (2.8)	26 (1.0)	8 (0.3)	715 (28.1)
Average rainy days	2.0	1.7	2.7	4.6	16.1	20.8	24.0	23.0	21.4	15.5	8.0	3.2	143
Source: Meteoblue

== Demographics ==
Population census of San Clemente
Year	Pop.	±% p.a.
1903	1,822	—
1918	2,654	+2.54%
1939	3,199	+0.89%
1948	4,392	+3.58%
1960	5,337	+1.64%
1970	6,073	+1.30%
1975	7,406	+4.06%
1980	7,117	−0.79%
1990	8,873	+2.23%
1995	11,105	+4.29%
2000	11,703	+1.13%
2007	12,458	+0.87%
2010	12,510	+0.15%
2015	12,657	+0.22%
2020	13,181	+0.86%
2024	13,781	+1.07%
Source: Philippine Statistics Authority

In the 2024 census, the population of San Clemente, Tarlac, was 13,781 people, with a density of 280 inhabitants per square kilometer or 730 inhabitants per square mile.

== Economy ==
Poverty incidence of San Clemente (%)

Source: Philippine Statistics Authority

== Tourism ==
- San Clemente Municipal Hall
- Saint Jude Thaddeus Parish Church of San Clemente
- Canding Falls
- Ubod Falls
- San Clemente Food Park

== Education ==
The San Clemente Schools District Office governs all educational institutions within the municipality. It oversees the management and operations of all private and public, from primary to secondary schools.

=== Primary and elementary schools ===
- Balloc Elementary School
- Bamban Elementary School
- Casipo Primary School
- Cat-Nag Elementary School
- Christian Academy
- Daldalayap Elementary School
- Doclong 1st Elementary School
- Doclong 2nd Elementary School
- Don Cesar Abad Gualberto Multi-grade School
- Dueg Resettlement Elementary School
- Maasin Elementary School
- Pit-Ao Elementary School

=== Secondary schools ===
- Bamban National High School
- Dueg High School
- San Clemente High School
- San Clemente Integrated School

== Gallery ==
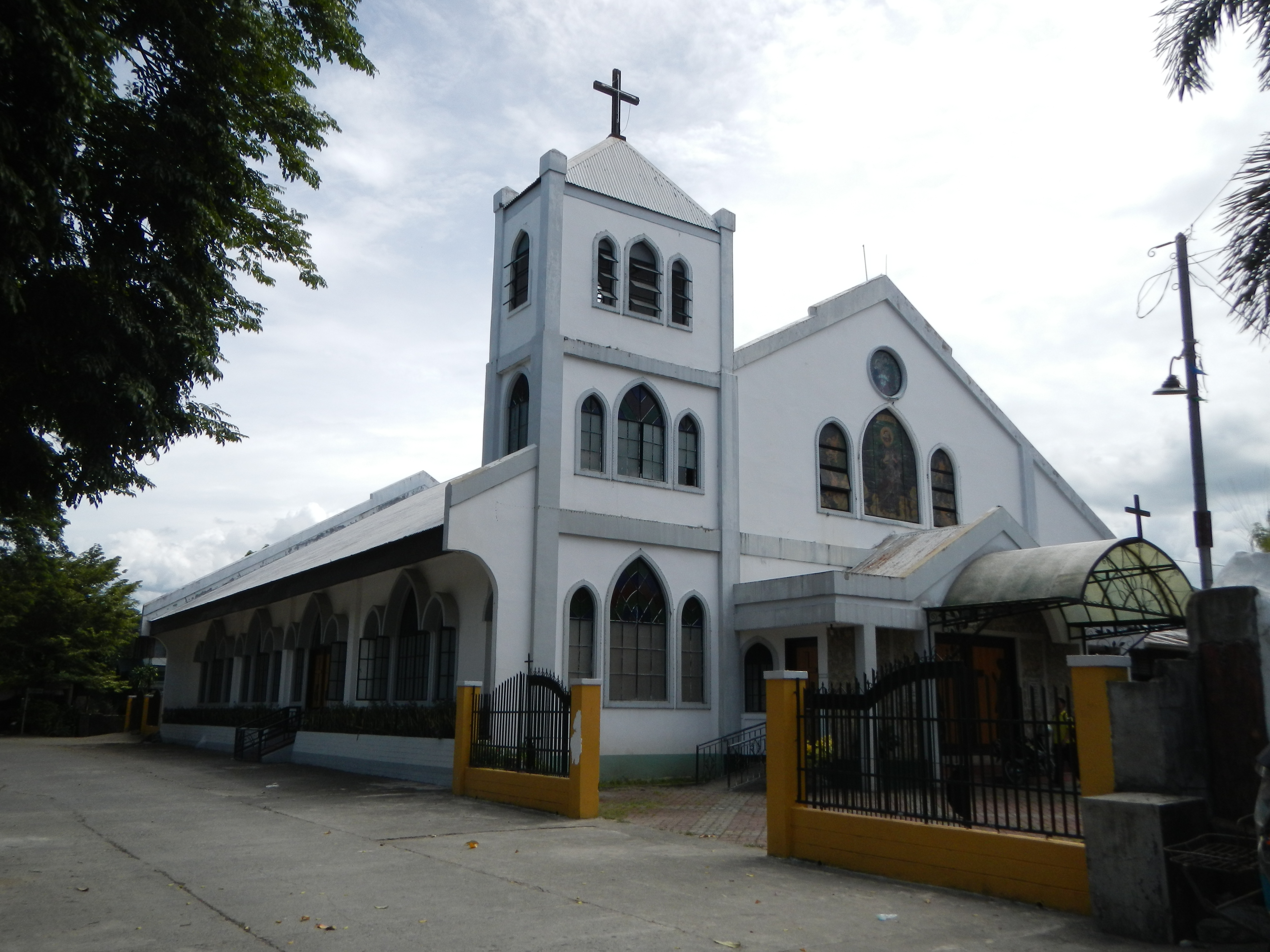
Saint Jude Thaddeus Parish Church of San Clemente

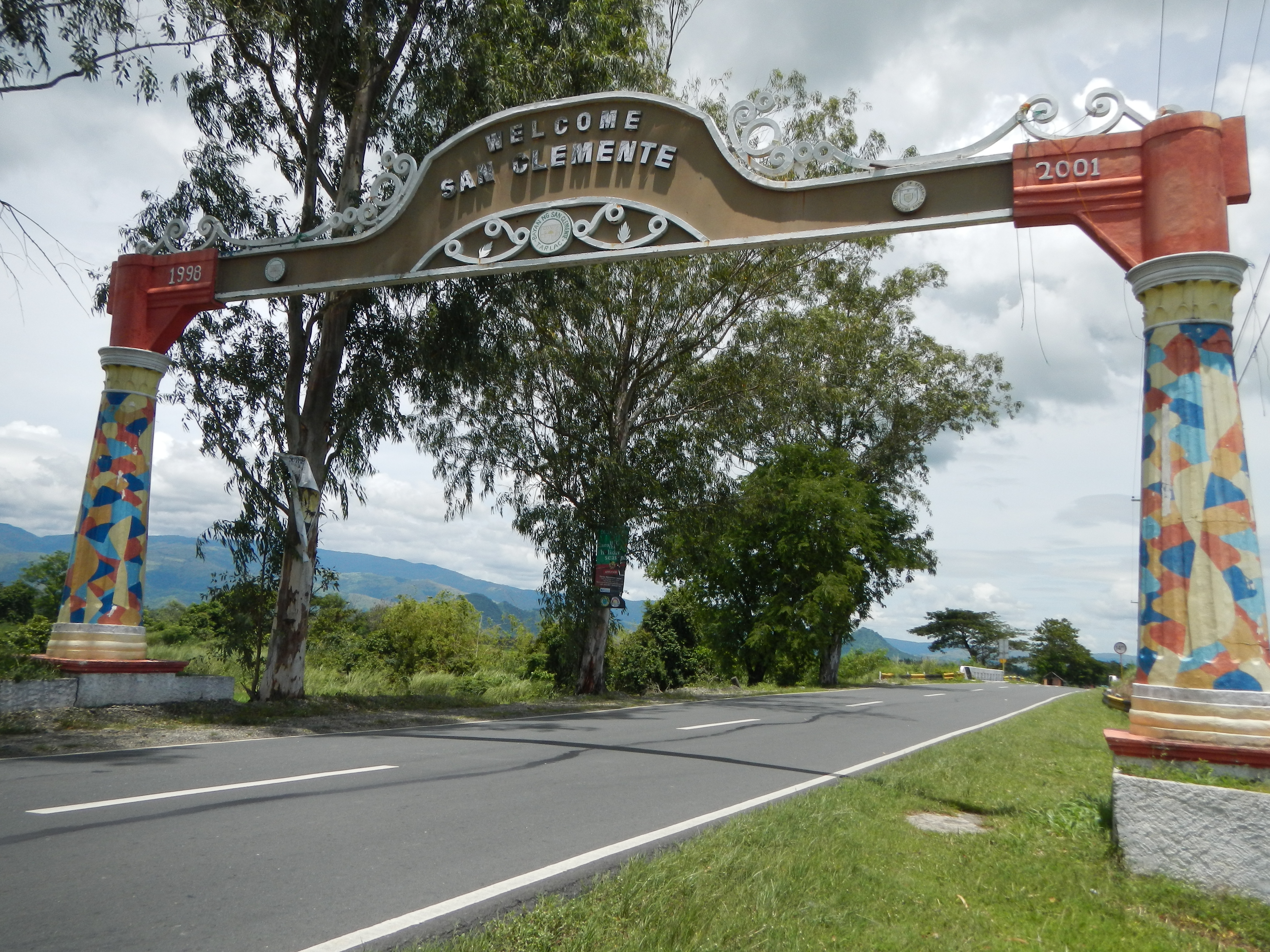
Welcome arch

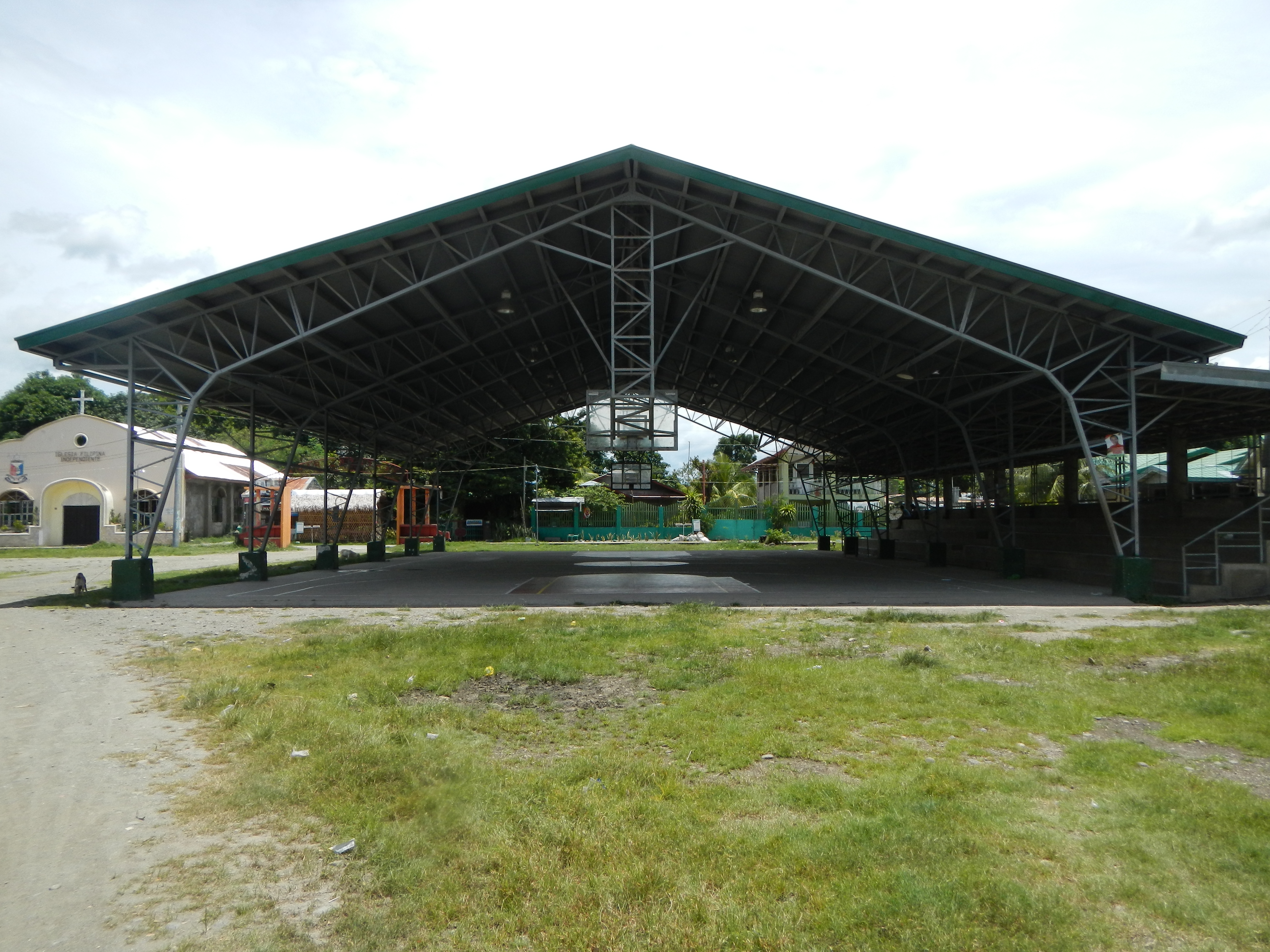
Gymnasium, basketball court

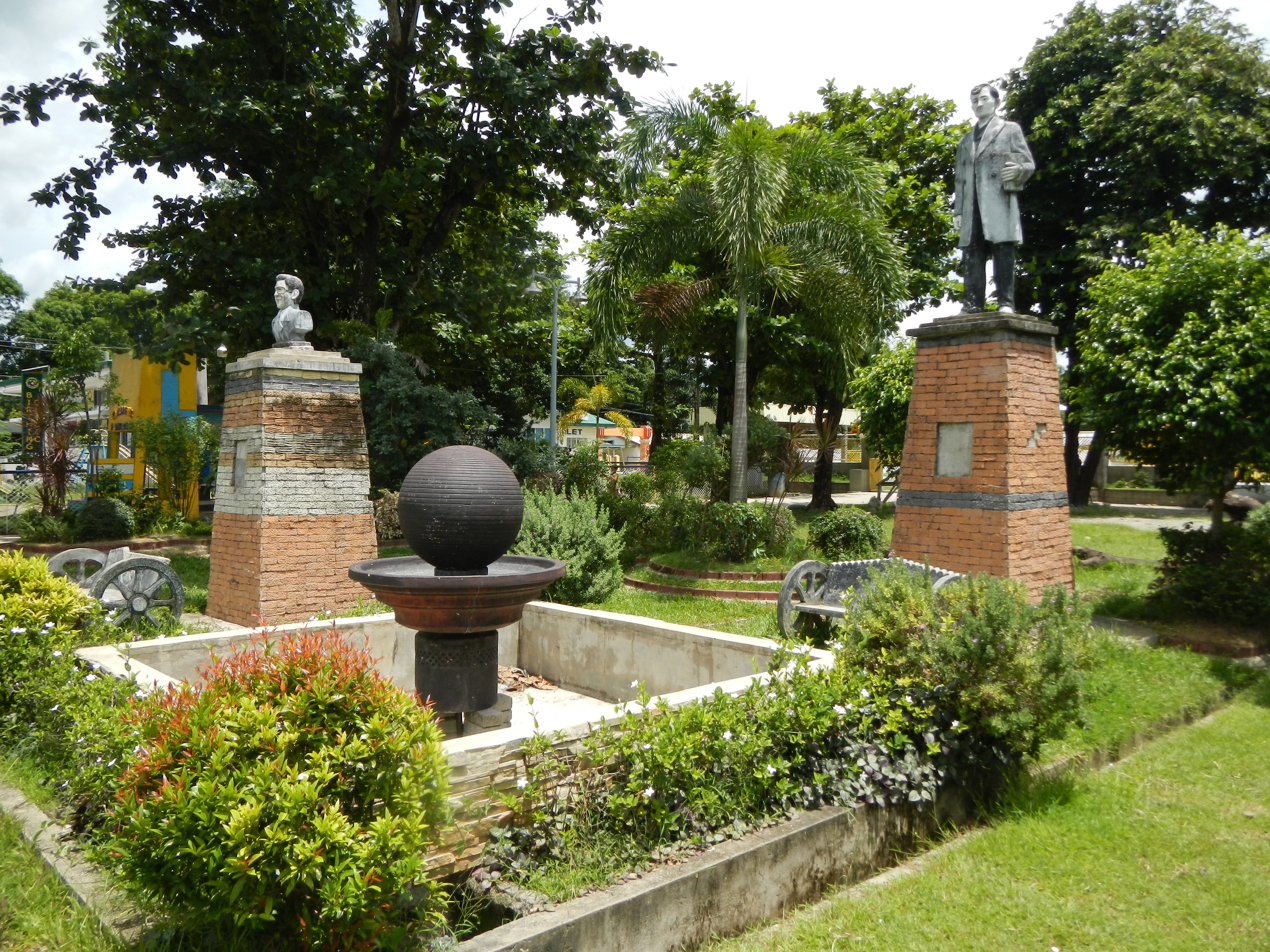
Town plaza, 3 Monuments

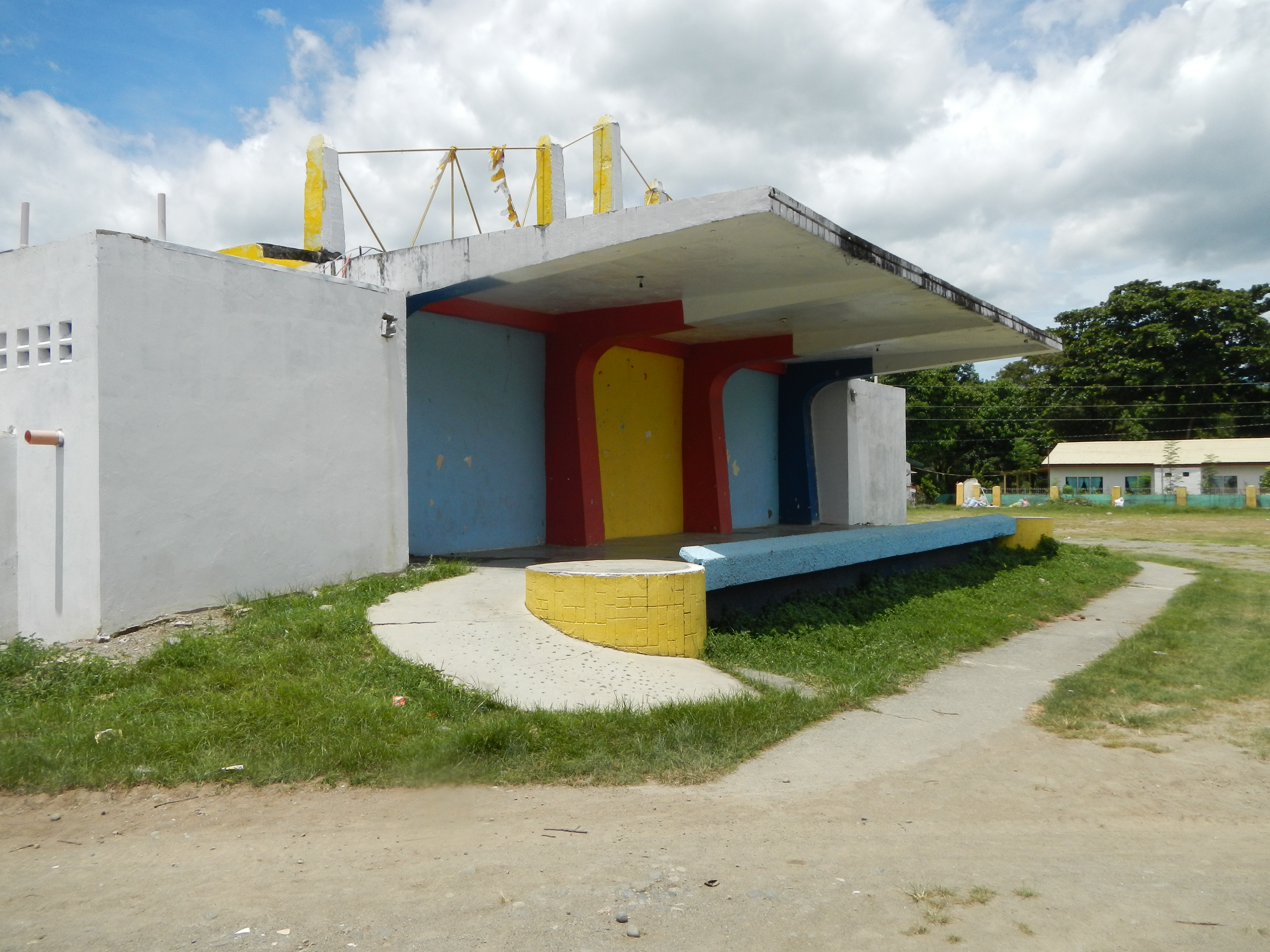
Auditorium, grandstand

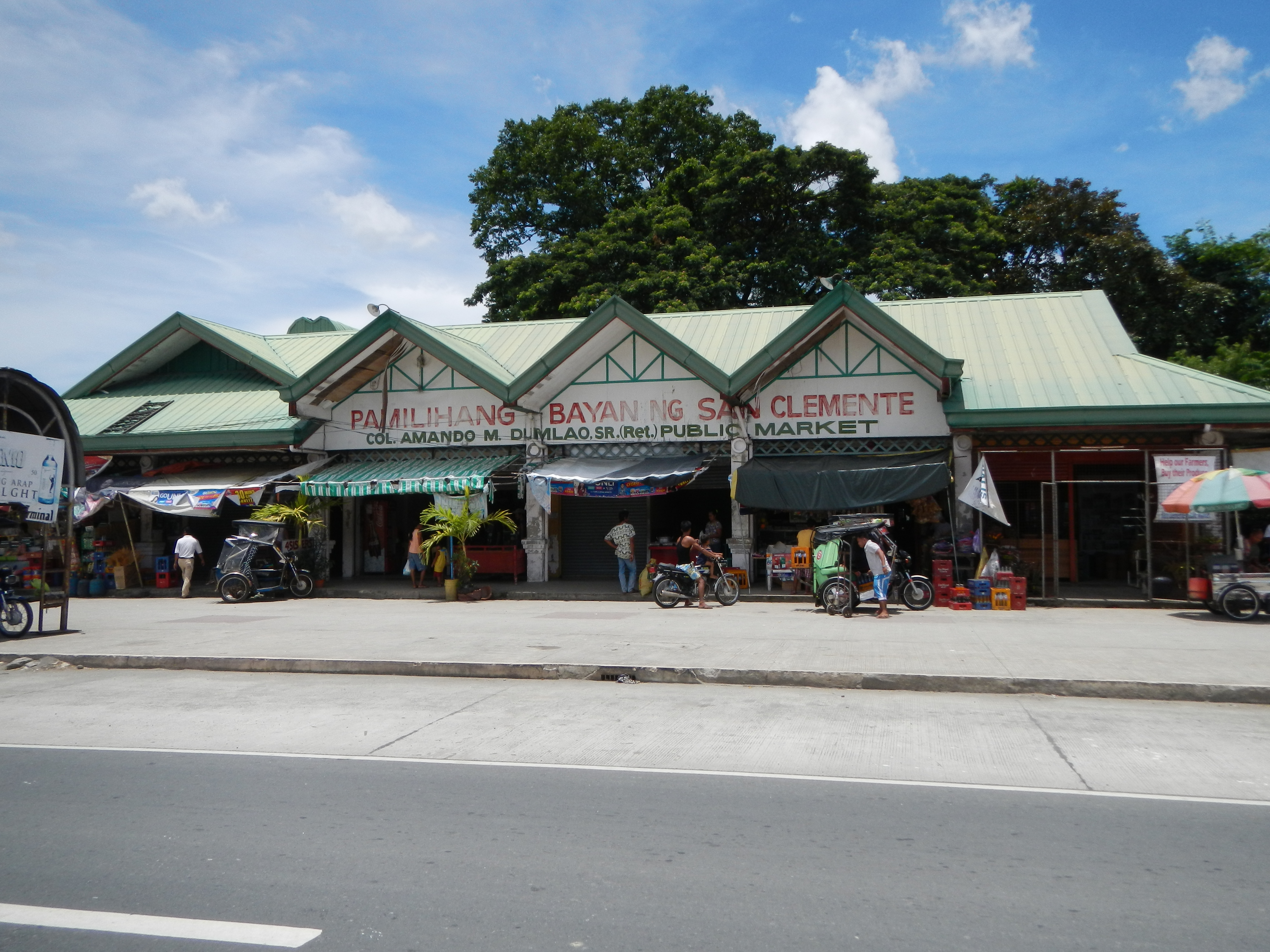
Public market, bus, jeep and tricycle terminal
