= Pura, Tarlac =

Municipality in Tarlac, Philippines

Pura
- Municipality
- Municipality of Pura
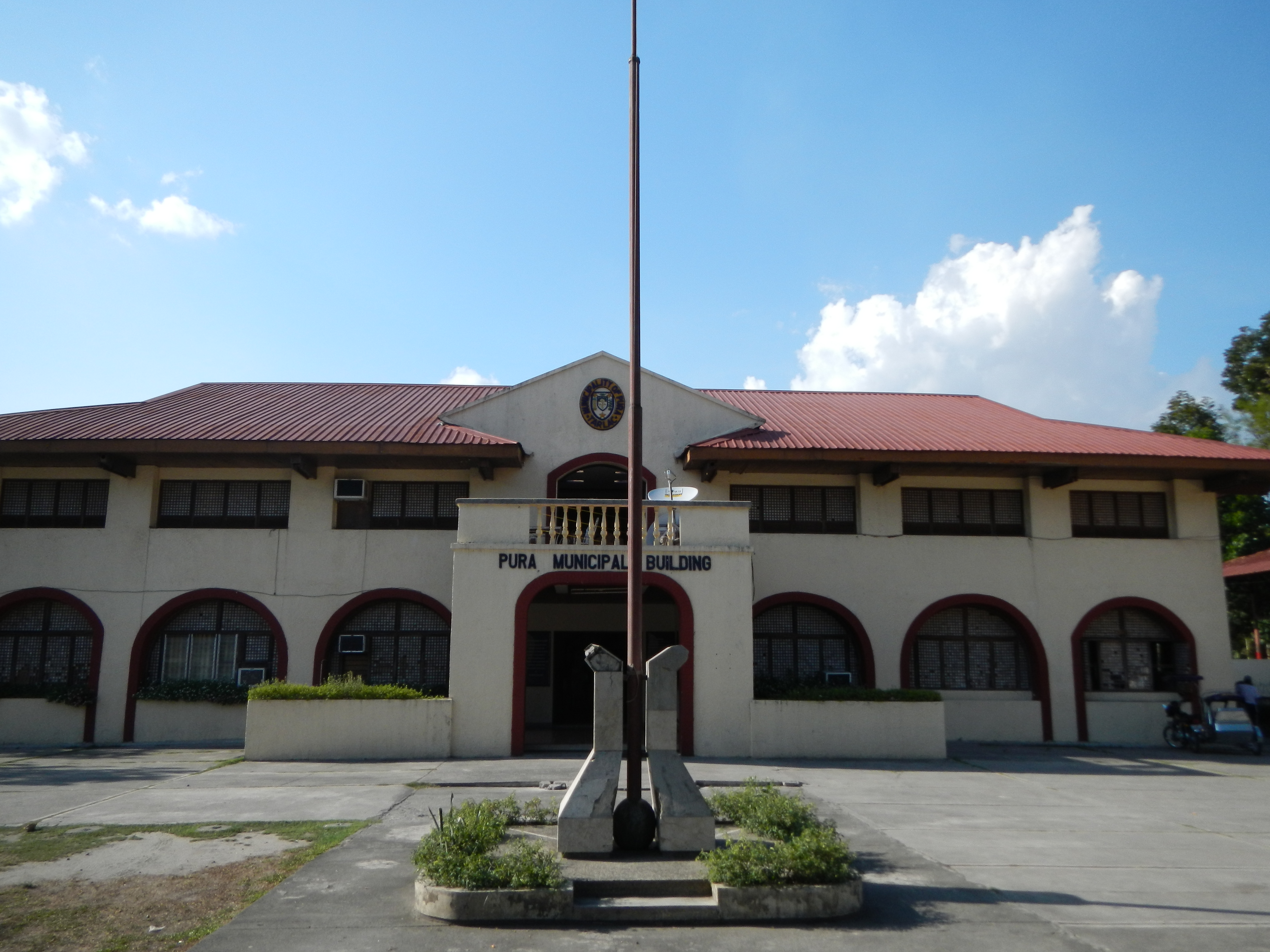
- Municipal Hall

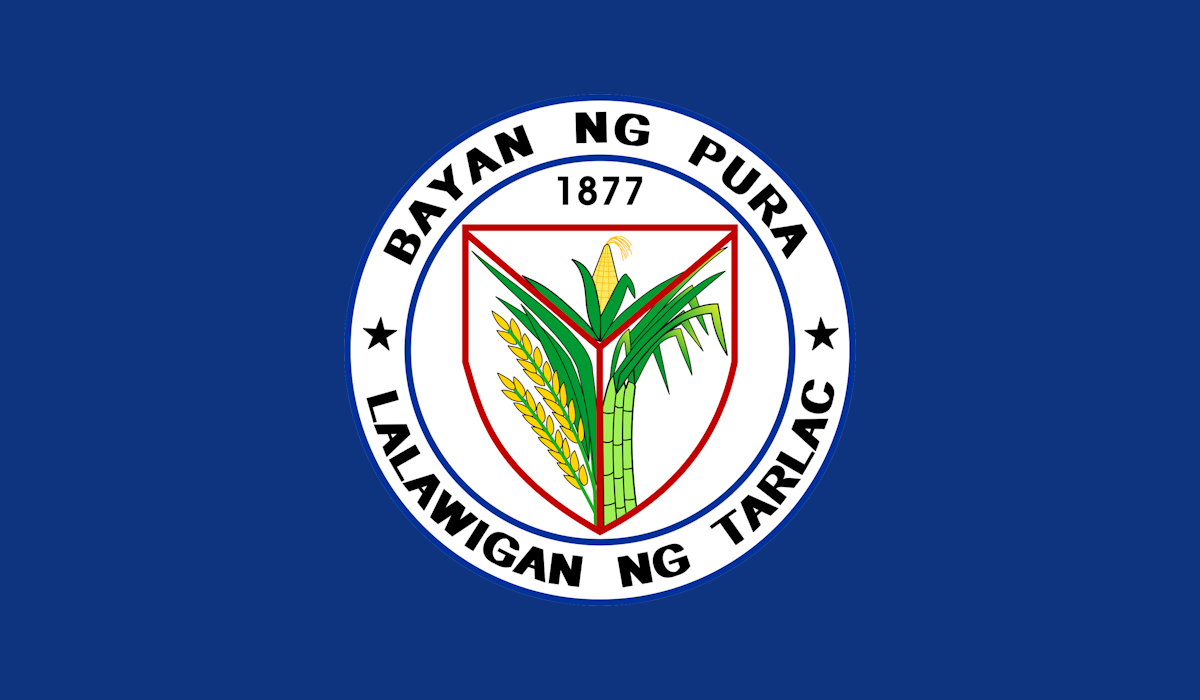
- Flag Seal

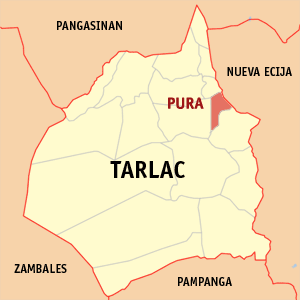
- Map of Tarlac with Pura highlighted
- Interactive map of Pura
- Location within the Philippines
- Coordinates: 15°37′29″N 120°38′53″E
- Country: Philippines
- Region: Central Luzon
- Province: Tarlac
- District: 1st district
- Founded: 1877
- Barangays: 16 (see Barangays)

Government
  - Type: Sangguniang Bayan
  - Mayor: Atty. John Paul Balmores
  - Vice Mayor: Bernabe P. Idmilao
  - Representative: Jaime D. Cojuangco
  - Councilor: Kevin Sawit
  - Electorate: 18,851 voters (2025)

Area
  - Total: 31.01 km^{2} (11.97 sq mi)
- Elevation: 25 m (82 ft)
- Highest elevation: 40 m (130 ft)
- Lowest elevation: 17 m (56 ft)

Population (2024 census)
  - Total: 27,017
  - Density: 871.2/km^{2} (2,256/sq mi)
  - Households: 6,559

Economy
  - Income class: 3rd municipal income class
  - Poverty incidence: 9.81% (2023)
  - Revenue: ₱ 153.3 million (2024)
  - Assets: ₱ 469.8 million (2024)
  - Expenditure: ₱ 162.5 million (2024)
  - Liabilities: ₱ 87.93 million (2024)

Service provider
  - Electricity: Tarlac 1 Electric Cooperative (TARELCO 1)
- Time zone: UTC+8 (PST)
- ZIP code: 2312
- PSGC: 0306911000
- IDD : area code: +63 (0)45
- Native languages: Pangasinan; Ilocano; Tagalog; Kapampangan
- Website: www.puratarlac.gov.ph

Pura, officially the Municipality of Pura (Pangasinan: Baley na Pura; Ilocano: Ili ti Pura; Tagalog: Bayan ng Pura), is a municipality in the province of Tarlac, Philippines. According to the 2024 census, it has a population of 27,017 people.

== Geography ==
Pura is located at the northeastern part of Tarlac, surrounded by the municipalities of Ramos to the north, Victoria to the south, Gerona to the west, and Guimba in Nueva Ecija to the east. It is 20 kilometres (12 mi) from the provincial capital Tarlac City, 61 kilometres (38 mi) from Clark Special Economic Zone (CSEZ) in Angeles City, and 144 kilometres (89 mi) north of Manila.

Pura has a total land area 3,142 hectares (31.42 km^{2}; 12.13 mi^{2}) which represents 1.02% of the entire provincial area. It comprises 16 barangays of which barangays Poblacion 1, 2, and 3 are considered urban area and the rest are considered rural. The land area per barangay is shown in the table below.

It is one of the exits of the Tarlac–Pangasinan–La Union Expressway (TPLEX).

=== Topography ===
Most of the Municipality of Pura is on a plain slope-less area. The soil series of Pura are light brownish gray to heavy black granular surface soil. When dry, they are hard and compact and break into big clogs. The subsoil is brownish to nearby black columns to coarse granular clay loam. The municipality of Pura has two distinct soil types: Luisita fine sand loam and Pura clay loam.

=== Climate ===
Climate data for Pura, Tarlac
| Month | Jan | Feb | Mar | Apr | May | Jun | Jul | Aug | Sep | Oct | Nov | Dec | Year |
|---|---|---|---|---|---|---|---|---|---|---|---|---|---|
| Mean daily maximum °C (°F) | 30 (86) | 31 (88) | 33 (91) | 35 (95) | 33 (91) | 31 (88) | 30 (86) | 29 (84) | 29 (84) | 30 (86) | 31 (88) | 30 (86) | 31 (88) |
| Mean daily minimum °C (°F) | 19 (66) | 19 (66) | 20 (68) | 22 (72) | 24 (75) | 24 (75) | 24 (75) | 24 (75) | 23 (73) | 22 (72) | 21 (70) | 20 (68) | 22 (71) |
| Average precipitation mm (inches) | 3 (0.1) | 2 (0.1) | 5 (0.2) | 10 (0.4) | 80 (3.1) | 107 (4.2) | 138 (5.4) | 147 (5.8) | 119 (4.7) | 70 (2.8) | 26 (1.0) | 8 (0.3) | 715 (28.1) |
| Average rainy days | 2.0 | 1.7 | 2.7 | 4.6 | 16.1 | 20.8 | 24.0 | 23.0 | 21.4 | 15.5 | 8.0 | 3.2 | 143 |
Source: Meteoblue

Pura, just like any other town in the province of the Tarlac has two pronounced seasons. The wet season is from May to September and the dry season is from October to April. This type of climate is typically hot, humid, and tropical and is generally affected by the neighboring topography and prevalent wind direction that varies within the year. Tropical monsoon is carried into the area from the southeast in the month of May to September thereby causing heavy rainfall in the area. Most of the rainfalls are associated with typhoons.

=== Barangays ===
Pura is politically subdivided into 16 barangays, as shown below. Each barangay consists of puroks and some have sitios.

- Balite
- Buenavista
- Cadanglaan
- Estipona
- Linao
- Maasin
- Matindeg
- Maungib
- Naya
- Nilasin 1st
- Nilasin 2nd
- Poblacion 1
- Poblacion 2
- Poblacion 3
- Poroc
- Singat

== Demographics ==
Population census of Pura
| Year | Pop. | ±% p.a. |
|---|---|---|
| 1903 | 4,840 | — |
| 1918 | 5,333 | +0.65% |
| 1939 | 7,005 | +1.31% |
| 1948 | 9,508 | +3.45% |
| 1960 | 10,227 | +0.61% |
| 1970 | 12,763 | +2.24% |
| 1975 | 14,409 | +2.46% |
| 1980 | 14,801 | +0.54% |
| 1990 | 18,032 | +1.99% |
| 1995 | 18,902 | +0.89% |
| 2000 | 21,081 | +2.37% |
| 2007 | 22,188 | +0.71% |
| 2010 | 22,949 | +1.23% |
| 2015 | 23,712 | +0.62% |
| 2020 | 25,781 | +1.78% |
| 2024 | 27,017 | +1.13% |
Source: Philippine Statistics Authority

In the 2024 census, the population of Pura was 27,017 people, with a density of 870 inhabitants per square kilometre or 2,300 inhabitants per square mile.

=== Languages ===
Ilocano is the main dialect of Pura. Tagalog is also widely spoken and understood in the municipality.

== Economy ==
Poverty incidence of Pura (%)

Source: Philippine Statistics Authority

- Income: P 40,212,387.83 (2009)
- GDP: approx. US$20 Million
  - Per capita: P1,800.00
- Major sources of livelihood: Agriculture and Livestock, SME-Retailing

== Education ==
The Pura Schools District Office governs all educational institutions within the municipality. It oversees the management and operations of all private and public, from primary to secondary schools.

=== Primary and elementary schools ===
- Amazing Grace Christian Academy
- Buenavista Elementary School
- Don Quirino Sulit Elementary School
- Don Teodorico Pascual Primary School
- Doña Felisa Y. Sawit Elementary School
- Estipona Elementary School
- Linao Elementary School
- Maasin Elementary School
- Matindeg Elementary School
- Maungib Elementary School
- Naya Primary School
- Nilasin 1st Elementary School
- Poroc Elementary School
- Progressivist School of Buenavista
- Pura Academy
- Pura Central Elementary School
- Pura Community School
- Singat Primary School
- St. Antoninus Catholic School

=== Secondary schools ===
- Buenavista High School
- Estipona National High School
- Maungib National High School
- Pura Central High School

== Sister cities ==
- Quezon City
