= San Jose, Tarlac =

Municipality in Tarlac, Philippines

San Jose
- Municipality
- Municipality of San Jose
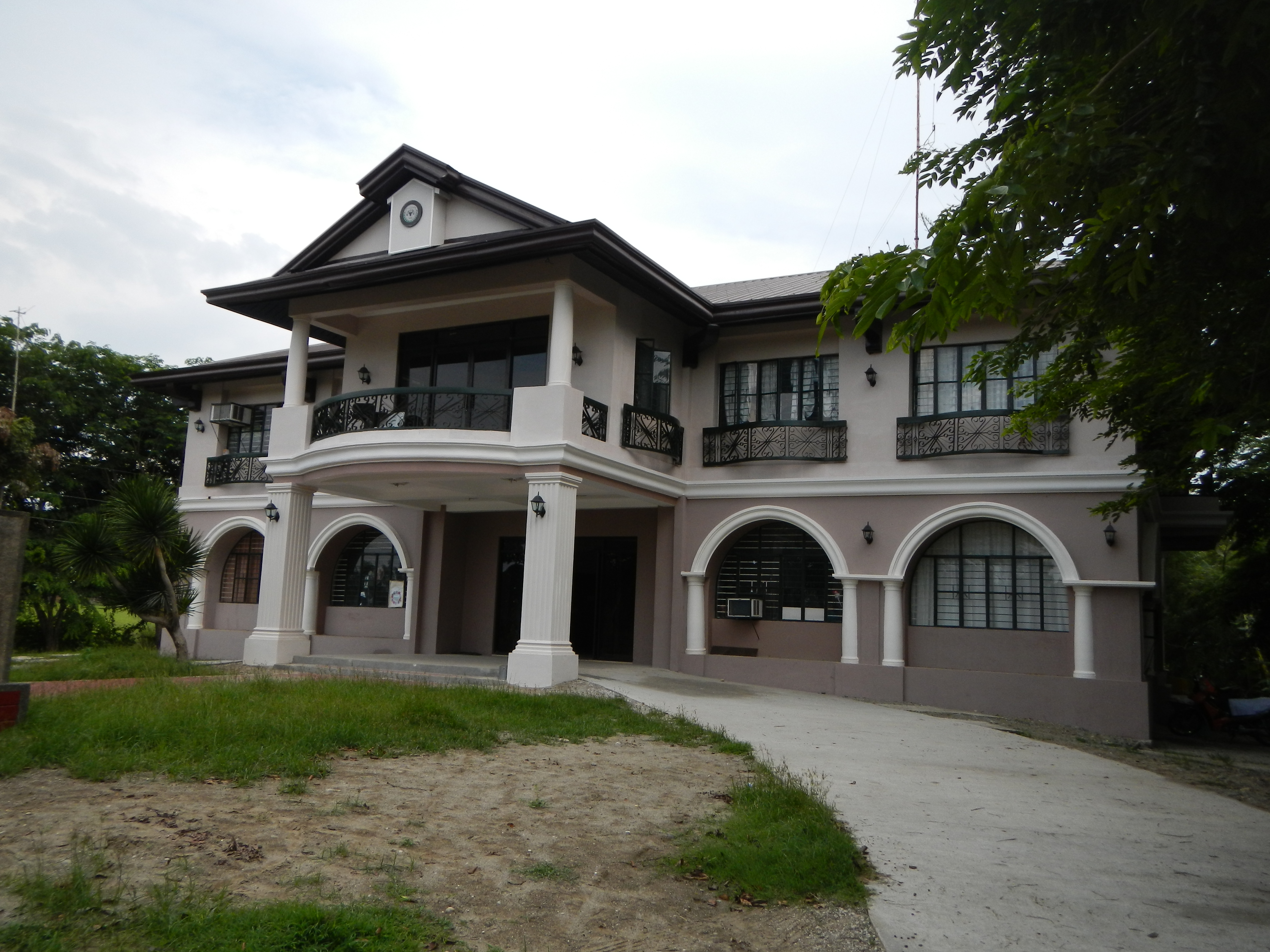
- Municipal Hall

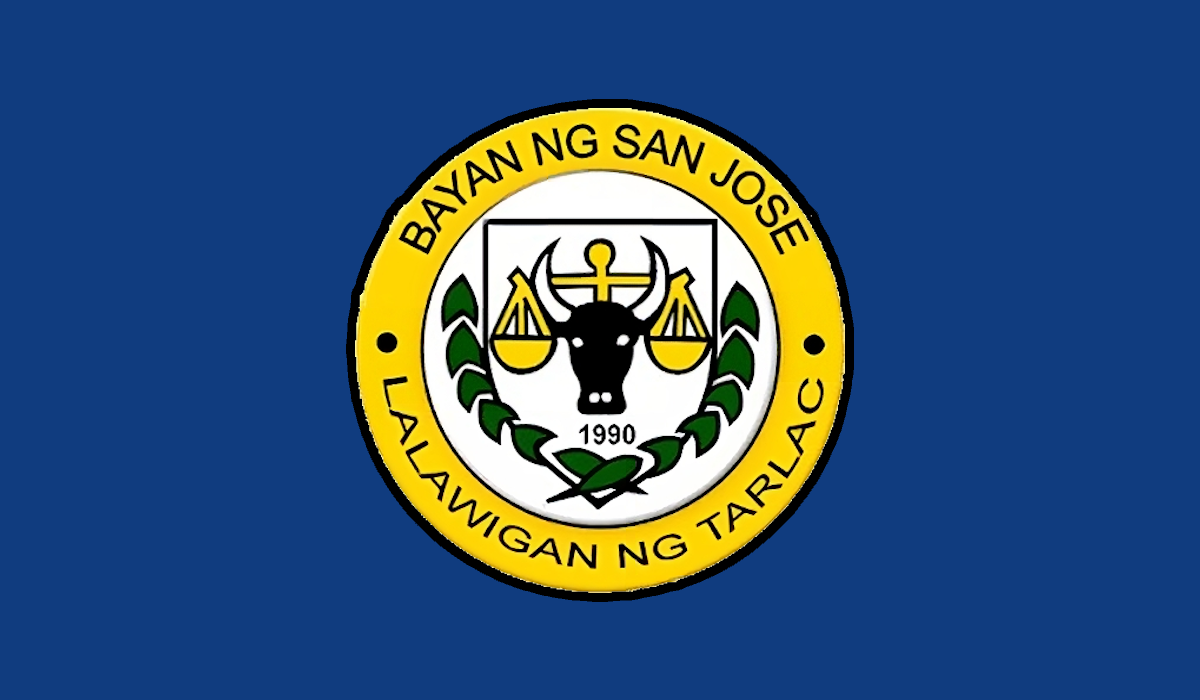
- Flag

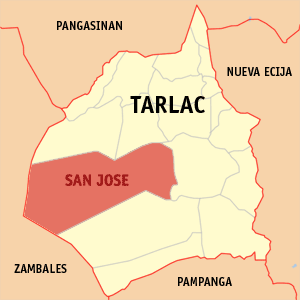
- Map of Tarlac with San Jose highlighted
- Interactive map of San Jose
- Location within the Philippines
- Coordinates: 15°28′41″N 120°27′50″E
- Country: Philippines
- Region: Central Luzon
- Province: Tarlac
- District: 2nd district
- Founded: April 21, 1990
- Barangays: 13 (see Barangays)

Government
  - Type: Sangguniang Bayan
  - Mayor: Romeo Gueco Capitulo
  - Vice Mayor: Riza E. Joaquin
  - Representative: Christian Tell A. Yap
  - Municipal Council: Members: Mico Yap Macasaet; Florence Joy P. Capiendo; Mc Jim Emmanuel I. Capiendo; Juliana A. Facun; Virginia V. Manuzon; Wilson B. Palma; Joeyson T. Cayabyab; Candido V. Facun Jr.
  - Electorate: 23,321 voters (2025)

Area
  - Total: 592.81 km^{2} (228.89 sq mi)
- Elevation: 131 m (430 ft)
- Highest elevation: 369 m (1,211 ft)
- Lowest elevation: 65 m (213 ft)

Population (2024 census)
  - Total: 43,185
  - Density: 72.848/km^{2} (188.68/sq mi)
  - Households: 9,665

Economy
  - Income class: 1st municipal income class
  - Poverty incidence: 19.9% (2023)
  - Revenue: ₱ 229.7 million (2024)
  - Assets: ₱ 811.6 million (2024)
  - Expenditure: ₱ 186.8 million (2024)
  - Liabilities: ₱ 212 million (2024)

Service provider
  - Electricity: Tarlac 1 Electric Cooperative (TARELCO 1)
- Time zone: UTC+8 (PST)
- ZIP code: 2318
- PSGC: 0306918000
- IDD : area code: +63 (0)45
- Native languages: Kapampangan; Tagalog; Ilocano

San Jose, officially the Municipality of San Jose (Ilocano: Ili ti San Jose; Kapampangan: Balen ning San Jose, Tagalog: Bayan ng San Jose), is a municipality in the province of Tarlac, Philippines. According to the 2024 census, it has a population of 43,185 people.

== History ==
The municipality, comprising 13 barangays, had long been envisioned as early as 1927 by Don Benigno Aquino Sr. and later supported by his son, Senator Benigno "Ninoy" Aquino Jr., although the plan was delayed by political circumstances and during Martial Law years, the initiative was revived in the late 1980s through petitions led by Amado de Leon, Samuel M. Eugenio, and other local leaders, with legislative support from Congressman Jose V. Yap Sr., Governor José Cojuangco, and Mayor Jose G. Macapinlac.

Pursuant to Republic Act No. 6842 which sought to create the Municipality of San Jose in the Province of Tarlac, signed by Corazon Aquino and approved on January 5, 1990. After its ratification in a plebiscite held on April 21, 1990, the Municipality of San Jose was established. The first mayor, vice-mayor, and municipal councilors were appointed by Corazon Aquino and they served their respective terms until the noon of June 30, 1992.

Today, San Jose is positioning itself as an agro-industrial and eco-tourism hub of Tarlac, noted for its natural landscapes and the Monasterio de Tarlac, which houses a relic of the Holy Cross of Jesus Christ.

== Geography ==
San Jose is the largest municipality of the province in terms of land area. The Monasterio de Tarlac is located in this municipality.

San Jose is 42 kilometres (26 mi) from Tarlac City and 134 kilometres (83 mi) from Manila. It shares with Mayantoc the Mount Sawtooth Protected Landscape.

=== Barangays ===
San Jose is politically subdivided into 13 barangays, as shown below: Each barangay consists of puroks and some have sitios.

- Burgos
- David
- Iba
- Labney
- Lawacamulag
- Lubigan
- Maamot
- Mababanaba
- Moriones
- Pao
- San Juan de Valdez
- Sula
- Villa Aglipay

=== Climate ===
Climate data for San Jose, Tarlac
Month	Jan	Feb	Mar	Apr	May	Jun	Jul	Aug	Sep	Oct	Nov	Dec	Year
Mean daily maximum °C (°F)	30 (86)	31 (88)	33 (91)	34 (93)	33 (91)	31 (88)	29 (84)	29 (84)	29 (84)	30 (86)	30 (86)	29 (84)	31 (87)
Mean daily minimum °C (°F)	19 (66)	19 (66)	20 (68)	22 (72)	24 (75)	24 (75)	24 (75)	24 (75)	24 (75)	22 (72)	21 (70)	20 (68)	22 (71)
Average precipitation mm (inches)	5 (0.2)	5 (0.2)	10 (0.4)	23 (0.9)	136 (5.4)	191 (7.5)	245 (9.6)	241 (9.5)	200 (7.9)	108 (4.3)	36 (1.4)	12 (0.5)	1,212 (47.8)
Average rainy days	2.6	2.5	4.4	8.3	20.9	24.4	27.4	26.9	25.0	18.2	9.2	3.6	173.4
Source: Meteoblue

== Demographics ==
Population census of San Jose
Year	Pop.	±% p.a.
1990	20,483	—
1995	25,473	+4.17%
2000	29,440	+3.15%
2007	32,728	+1.47%
2010	33,960	+1.35%
2015	36,253	+1.25%
2020	41,182	+2.72%
2024	43,185	+1.15%
Source: Philippine Statistics Authority

In the 2020 census, the population of San Jose, Tarlac, was 41,182 people, with a density of 69 inhabitants per square kilometre or 180 inhabitants per square mile.

== Economy ==
Poverty incidence of San Jose (%)

Source: Philippine Statistics Authority

== Education ==
The San Jose Schools District Office governs all educational institutions within the municipality. It oversees the management and operations of all private and public, from primary to secondary schools.

=== Primary and elementary schools ===
- Agus Elementary School
- Burgos Elementary School
- Catigaacan Elementary School
- David Elementary School
- Dirita Elementary School
- E.V.A. Abelling Primary School
- Enrado Bose Elementary School
- Iba Elementary School
- Labney Elementary School
- Lawacamulag Elementary School
- Linglingay Elementary School
- Lubigan Elementary School
- Maamot Elementary School
- Mababanaba Elementary School
- Malinta Elementary School
- Moriones Elementary School
- Pao Elementary School
- Pisapungan Elementary School
- Quimmardero Elementary School
- San Juan de Moriones Elementary School
- San Pedro Elementary School
- Sta. Cruz Elementary School
- Sula Elementary School
- Tala Elementary School
- Tangan-Tangan Elementary School
- Villa Aglipay Central Elementary School
- Wesleyan Christian School
- Western Tarlac Adventist Multigrade School

=== Secondary schools ===
- Iba High School
- Maamot Integrated School
- Mababanaba High School
- Moriones High School
- San Jose National High School
- San Juan de Valdez Integrated School
- Villa Aglipay National High School
