= Mayantoc =

Municipality in Tarlac, Philippines

- Municipality
- Municipality of Mayantoc
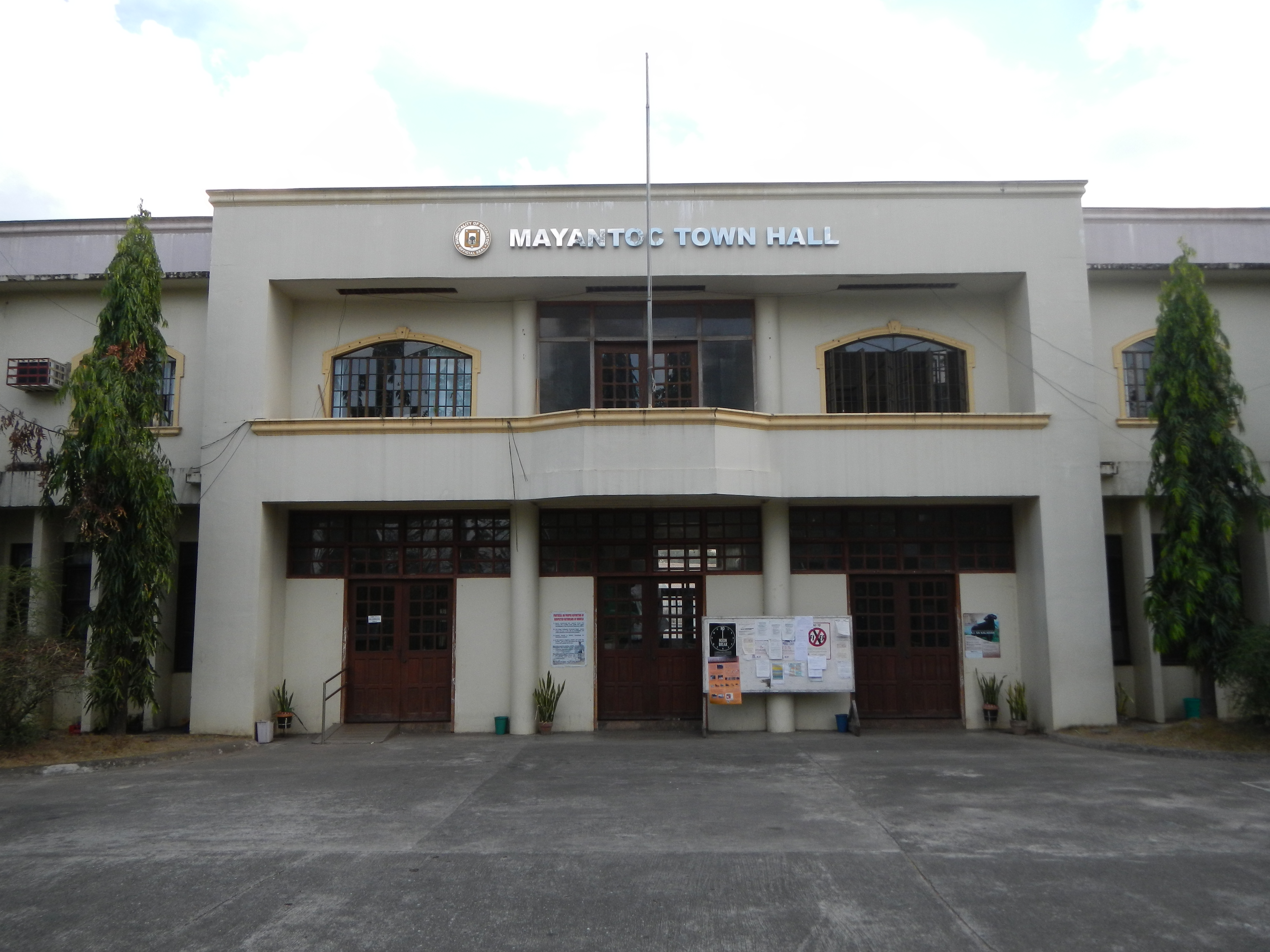
- Municipal Hall

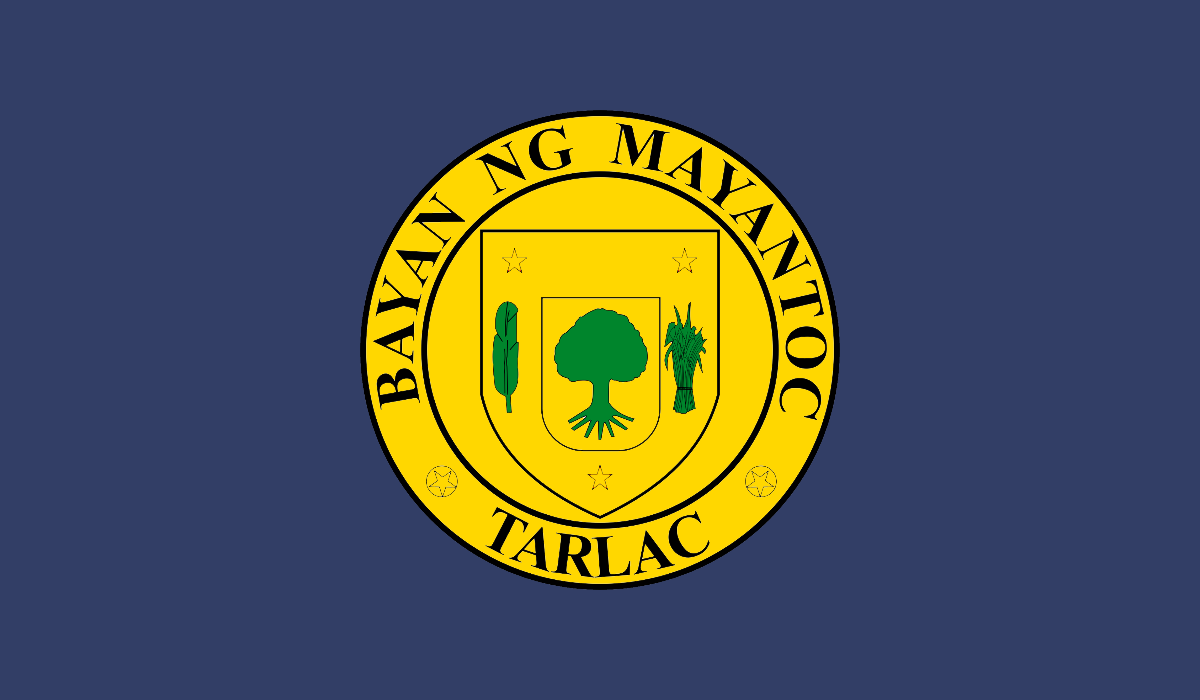
- Flag Seal

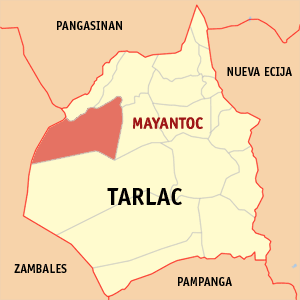
- Map of Tarlac with Mayantoc highlighted
- Interactive map of Mayantoc
- Location within the Philippines
- Coordinates: 15°37′13″N 120°22′39″E
- Country: Philippines
- Region: Central Luzon
- Province: Tarlac
- District: 1st district
- Founded: 1917
- Barangays: 24 (see Barangays)

Government
  - Type: Sangguniang Bayan
  - Mayor: Iluminado E. Pobre jr.
  - Vice Mayor: Venus Razalan Tomas
  - Representative: Carlos O. Cojuangco
  - Electorate: 21,815 voters (2025)

Area
  - Total: 311.42 km^{2} (120.24 sq mi)
- Elevation: 58 m (190 ft)
- Highest elevation: 262 m (860 ft)
- Lowest elevation: 21 m (69 ft)

Population (2024 census)
  - Total: 34,091
  - Density: 109.47/km^{2} (283.52/sq mi)
  - Households: 8,232

Economy
  - Income class: 1st municipal income class
  - Poverty incidence: 11.28% (2023)
  - Revenue: ₱ 225.4 million (2024)
  - Assets: ₱ 723.3 million (2024)
  - Expenditure: ₱ 195.5 million (2024)
  - Liabilities: ₱ 313.6 million (2024)

Service provider
  - Electricity: Tarlac 1 Electric Cooperative (TARELCO 1)
- Time zone: UTC+8 (PST)
- ZIP code: 2304
- PSGC: 0306908000
- IDD : area code: +63 (0)45
- Native languages: Pangasinan; Tagalog; Kapampangan; Ilocano
- Website: www.mayantoc.gov.ph

Mayantoc, officially the Municipality of Mayantoc (Pangasinan: Baley na Mayantoc; Ilocano: Ili ti Mayantoc; Tagalog: Bayan ng Mayantoc), is a municipality in the province of Tarlac, Philippines. According to the 2024 census, it has a population of 34,091 people.

== Etymology ==
The town got its name after a palm called 'yantoc' due to its abundance in the area.

== History ==
The first settlers of Mayantoc before the coming of Christian migrants were the negritos of the Abiling tribe. As they arrived in great numbers, so the natives were soon forced to move deeper into the forest areas of the Zambales mountain range.

The Christian settlers, mostly came from the Ilocos region, notably the towns of Cabugao, Tagudin, Sarrat, Paoay, Sinait and Bacarra settled in villages in the southern portion of the thriving town of Camiling, acknowledged as the mother town of Mayantoc. These villages later formed the barangay of Mayantoc under the township of Camiling. The place was still a forested area where rattan was abundant, a palm known by visitor traders as "Yantoc", so that in time the barangay became known as Na Maraming Yantoc – the place of yantoc – later just Ma-Yantoc. As the barangay progressed and grew in the size and population, its inhabitants retained "Mayantoc" as its official name.

In an effort to convert the barangay of Mayantoc into a town, a petition signed by the inhabitants was sent to the proper authorities on 23 December 1916, with title deeds of several parcels of lands attached for the proposed school, market, plaza and town hall sites.

There were many others who helped in the birth of the new town, including Governor Gardner and Representative Luis Morales. Don Sergio Osmena, the speaker of House of Representative also helped in the granting of the people's petition. Then the American Governor General Francisco Burton Harrison promulgated Executive Order No. 96 declaring Mayantoc a separate town from Camiling and the new town was inaugurated on 17 January 1917. Don Manuel de Leon, then Governor of Tarlac province appointed Castillan Antonio Sanz, as the town first Municipal President. However Sanz was autocratic in Spanish customs and was in office for only six months, before a petition seeking his ousting, signed by several municipal councilors.

When the provincial board of Tarlac received the petition, Antonio Sanz was unseated, to be succeeded by the Vice President, Don Francisco Pascual Santos. That same year, an election was held in which Don Francisco P. Santos became the first elected Municipal President of Mayantoc.

The question of leadership having been popularly decided, the townspeople then took up the task of building the physical facilities of the community. The problem of a presentable Presidencia came up. But the municipal government was very poor. Bridges and roads were urgently needed. Canals along the roads of the town, especially around the plaza, needed digging. There were plenty of problems but few resources. The principal resource was the people themselves, imbued with pioneering spirit, cooperative and loyal to the leadership. The people donated whatever material they could afford, and freely gave their time and labor on the different projects of the new town.

== Geography ==
Mayantoc is nestled in the foothills of the Zambales Mountains where the Camiling River originates and provides many scenic picnic and swimming sites, making it known as the "summer capital" of the province. The most common road to Mayantoc starts at "Crossing Mayantoc", at the national highway to Camiling, Tarlac just after the then Tarlac College of Agriculture (now the Tarlac Agricultural University) campus.

Mayantoc is 46 kilometres (29 mi) from Tarlac City and 170 kilometres (110 mi) from Manila. It shares with San Jose the Mount Sawtooth Protected Landscape.

=== Barangays ===
Mayantoc is administratively divided into 24 barangays, as shown below. Each barangay consists of puroks and some have sitios.

- Ambalingit
- Baybayaoas
- Bigbiga
- Binbinaca
- Calabtangan
- Caocaoayan
- Carabaoan
- Cubcub
- Gayonggayong
- Gossood
- Labney
- Mamonit
- Maniniog
- Mapandan
- Nambalan
- Pedro L. Quines
- Pitombayog
- Poblacion Norte
- Poblacion Sur
- Rotrottooc
- San Bartolome
- San Jose
- Taldiapan
- Tangcarang

=== Climate ===
Climate data for Mayantoc, Tarlac
| Month | Jan | Feb | Mar | Apr | May | Jun | Jul | Aug | Sep | Oct | Nov | Dec | Year |
|---|---|---|---|---|---|---|---|---|---|---|---|---|---|
| Mean daily maximum °C (°F) | 30 (86) | 31 (88) | 33 (91) | 35 (95) | 33 (91) | 31 (88) | 30 (86) | 29 (84) | 29 (84) | 30 (86) | 31 (88) | 30 (86) | 31 (88) |
| Mean daily minimum °C (°F) | 19 (66) | 19 (66) | 20 (68) | 22 (72) | 24 (75) | 24 (75) | 24 (75) | 24 (75) | 23 (73) | 22 (72) | 21 (70) | 20 (68) | 22 (71) |
| Average precipitation mm (inches) | 3 (0.1) | 2 (0.1) | 5 (0.2) | 10 (0.4) | 80 (3.1) | 107 (4.2) | 138 (5.4) | 147 (5.8) | 119 (4.7) | 70 (2.8) | 26 (1.0) | 8 (0.3) | 715 (28.1) |
| Average rainy days | 2.0 | 1.7 | 2.7 | 4.6 | 16.1 | 20.8 | 24.0 | 23.0 | 21.4 | 15.5 | 8.0 | 3.2 | 143 |
Source: Meteoblue

== Demographics ==
Population census of Mayantoc
| Year | Pop. | ±% p.a. |
|---|---|---|
| 1918 | 5,480 | — |
| 1939 | 7,196 | +1.31% |
| 1948 | 7,988 | +1.17% |
| 1960 | 10,228 | +2.08% |
| 1970 | 13,558 | +2.86% |
| 1975 | 16,427 | +3.92% |
| 1980 | 17,135 | +0.85% |
| 1990 | 21,170 | +2.14% |
| 1995 | 22,952 | +1.53% |
| 2000 | 24,693 | +1.58% |
| 2007 | 27,274 | +1.38% |
| 2010 | 29,987 | +3.51% |
| 2015 | 32,232 | +1.38% |
| 2020 | 32,597 | +0.24% |
| 2024 | 34,091 | +1.08% |
Source: Philippine Statistics Authority

In the 2024 census, the population of Mayantoc was 34,091 people, with a density of 110 inhabitants per square kilometre or 280 inhabitants per square mile.

== Economy ==
Poverty incidence of Mayantoc (%)

Source: Philippine Statistics Authority

== Education ==
The Mayantoc Schools District Office governs all educational institutions within the municipality. It oversees the management and operations of all private and public, from primary to secondary schools.

=== Primary and elementary schools ===
- Ambalingit-Baybayaoas Elementary School
- Bigbiga Elementary School
- Binbinaca Primary School
- Carabaoan-Caocaoayan Elementary School
- Gayong-Gayong Elementary School
- Gossood Primary School
- Mamonit Elementary School
- Maniniog Elementary School
- Mapandan Elementary School
- Mayantoc Academy
- Mayantoc Angelicum School
- Mayantoc Central Elementary School
- Melecio Manganaan Elementary School
- Pedro L. Quines Elementary School
- Pitombayog Elementary School
- Rotrottooc-Calabtangan Elementary School
- San Bartolome Elementary School
- San Jose Elementary School
- Taldiapan Primary School

=== Secondary schools ===
- Carabaoan-Caocaoayan High School
- Josephine M. Cojuangco National Technical Vocational High School
- Labney Integrated School
- Mayantoc High School
- Nambalan Integrated School
- Pitombayog National High School
- San Bartolome National High School

=== Higher educational institution ===
- Glory Dei Montessori College

== Points of interest ==
- Saint Joseph Parish Church of Mayantoc (F-1842): Feast day, March 19; Parish Priest: Father Hipolito Pardinian; Vicariate of St. Michael the Archangel, Vicar Forane: Father Fred Dizon under the Roman Catholic Diocese of Tarlac.
- ASEAN-New Zealand (ANZAP) Twin Falls, Barangay Bigbiga
- Kiti Calao Waterfalls, Barangay San Jose
- Calao Ecological Park, Barangay San Jose
- Nambalan Trails Jump Off (Nambalan Saweng), Barangay Nambalan
- Istaka, Barangay Gossood
- Garma's Farms, Barangay Gossood
- Hidden Paradise, Barangay Mapandan
- Labney Water Camps, Barangay Labney

== Gallery ==
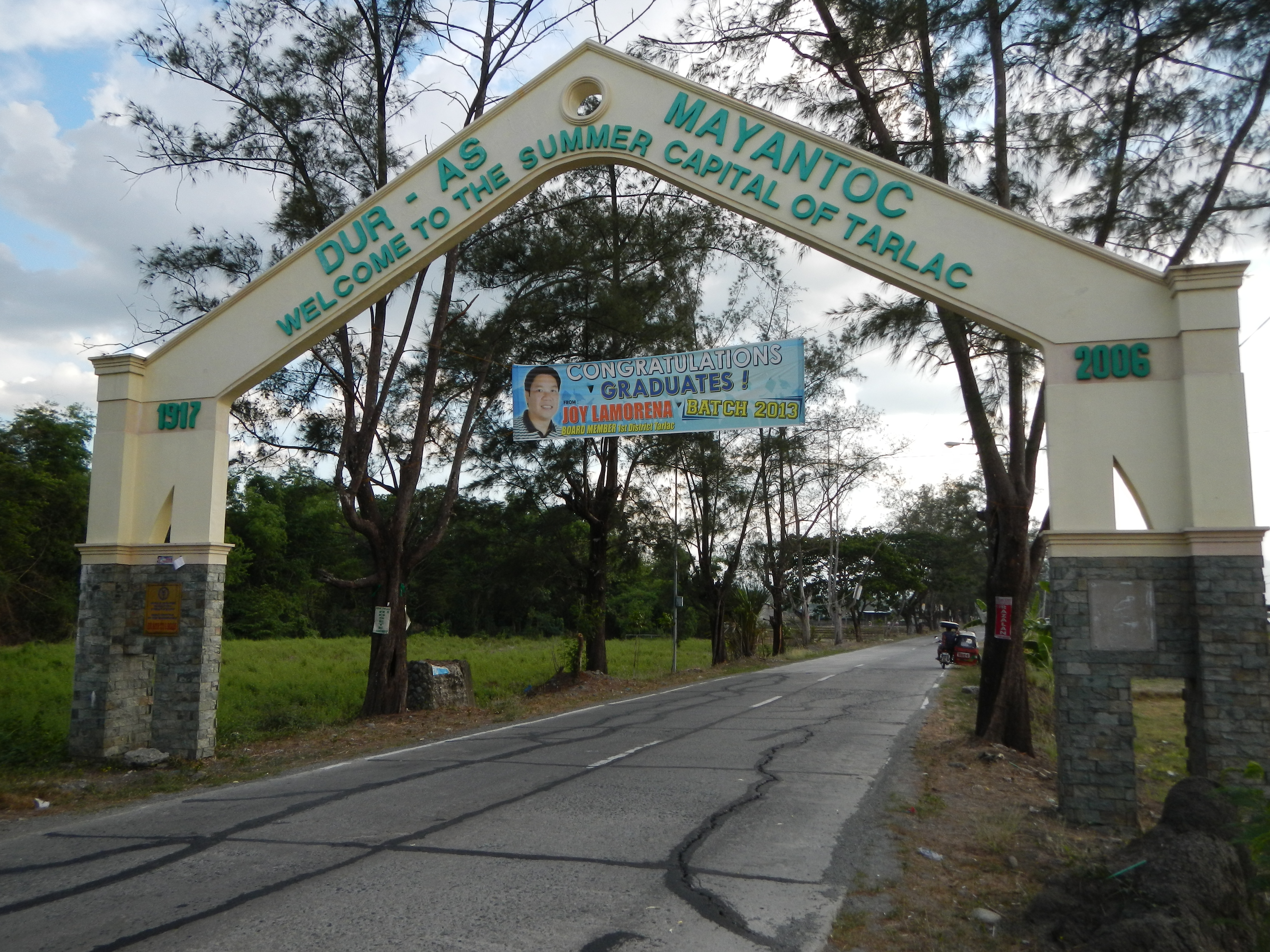
Mayantoc Welcome Arch (Old)

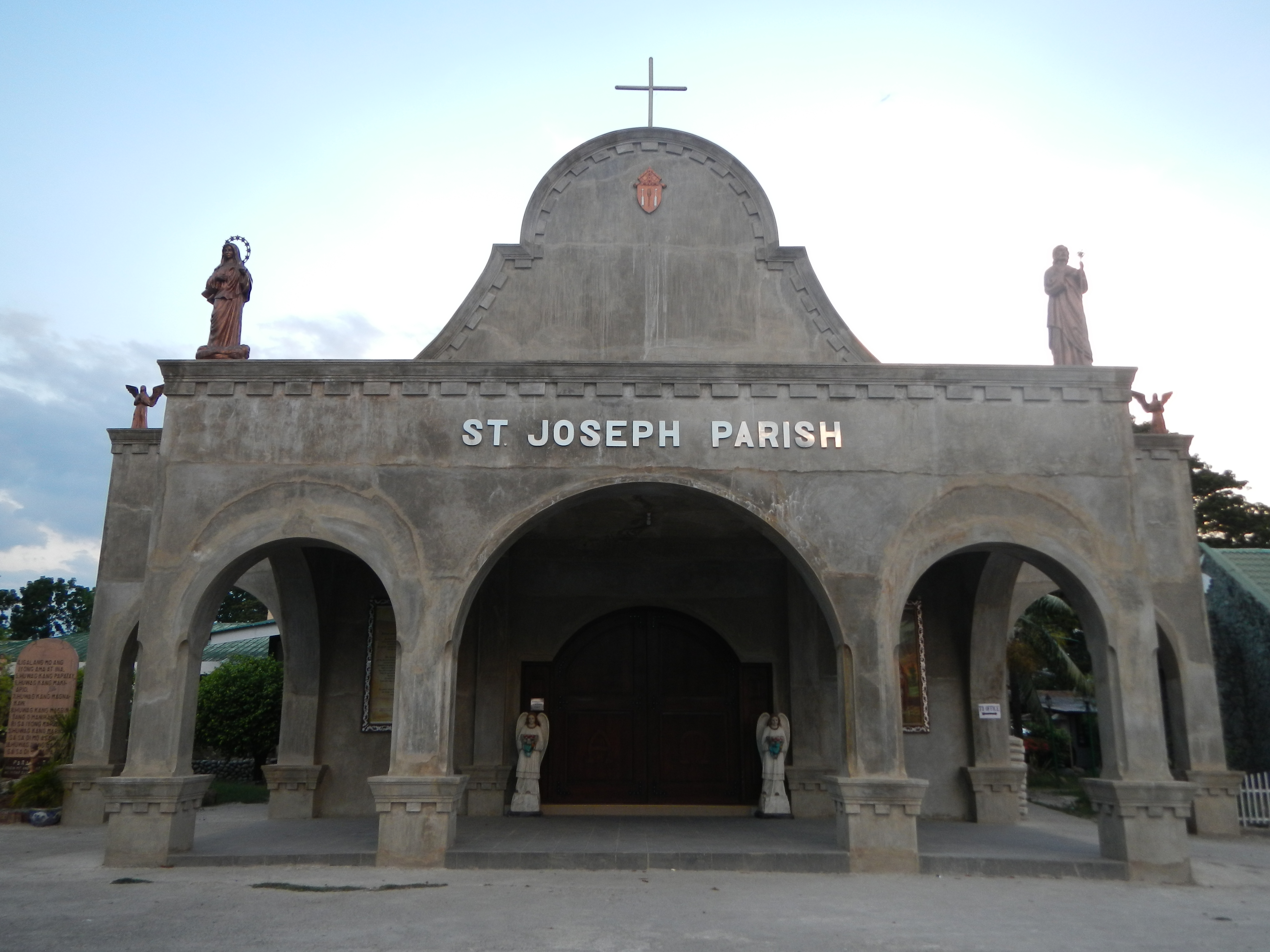
Saint Joseph Parish Church of Mayantoc

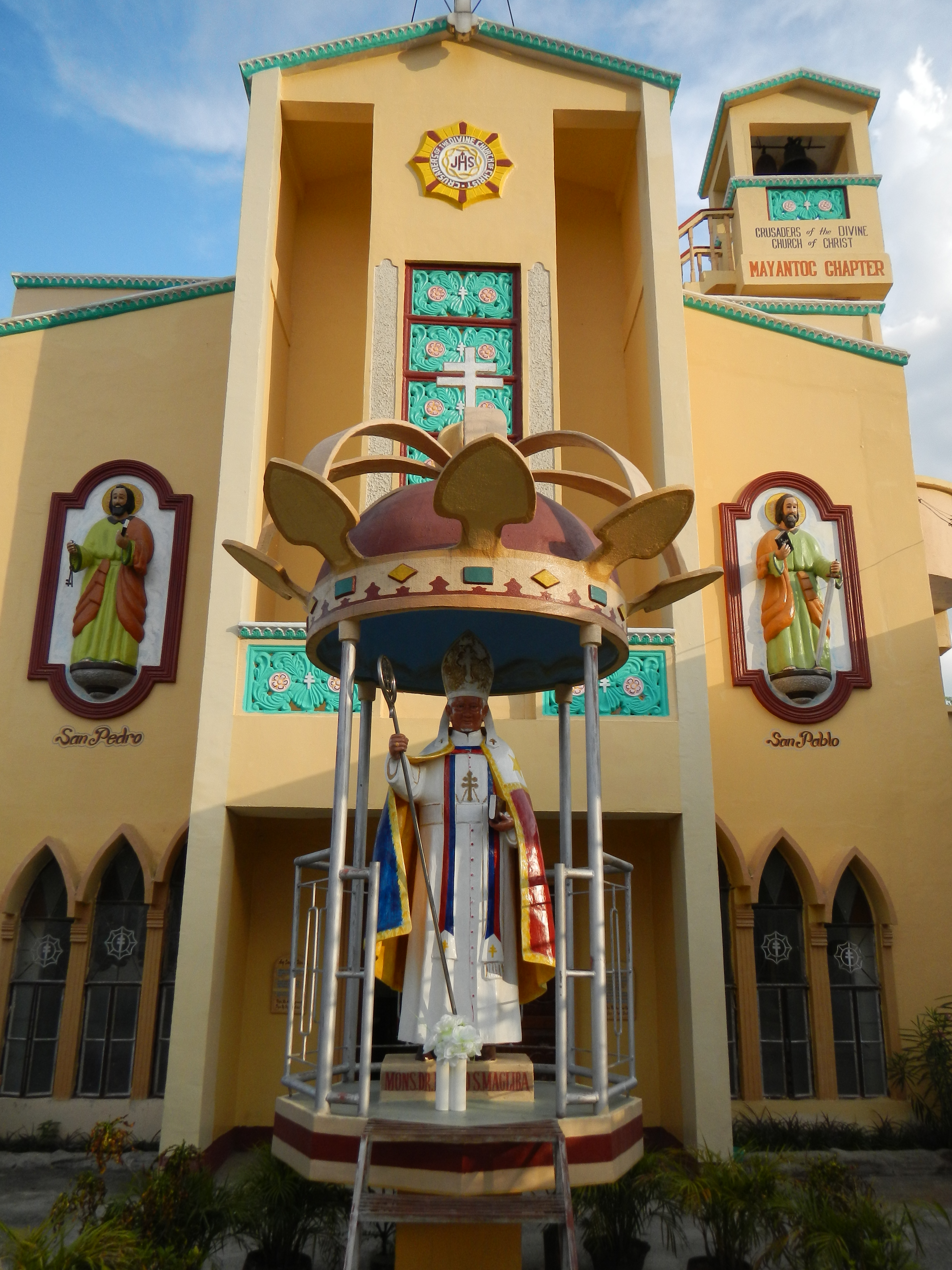
Crusaders of the Divine Church of Christ

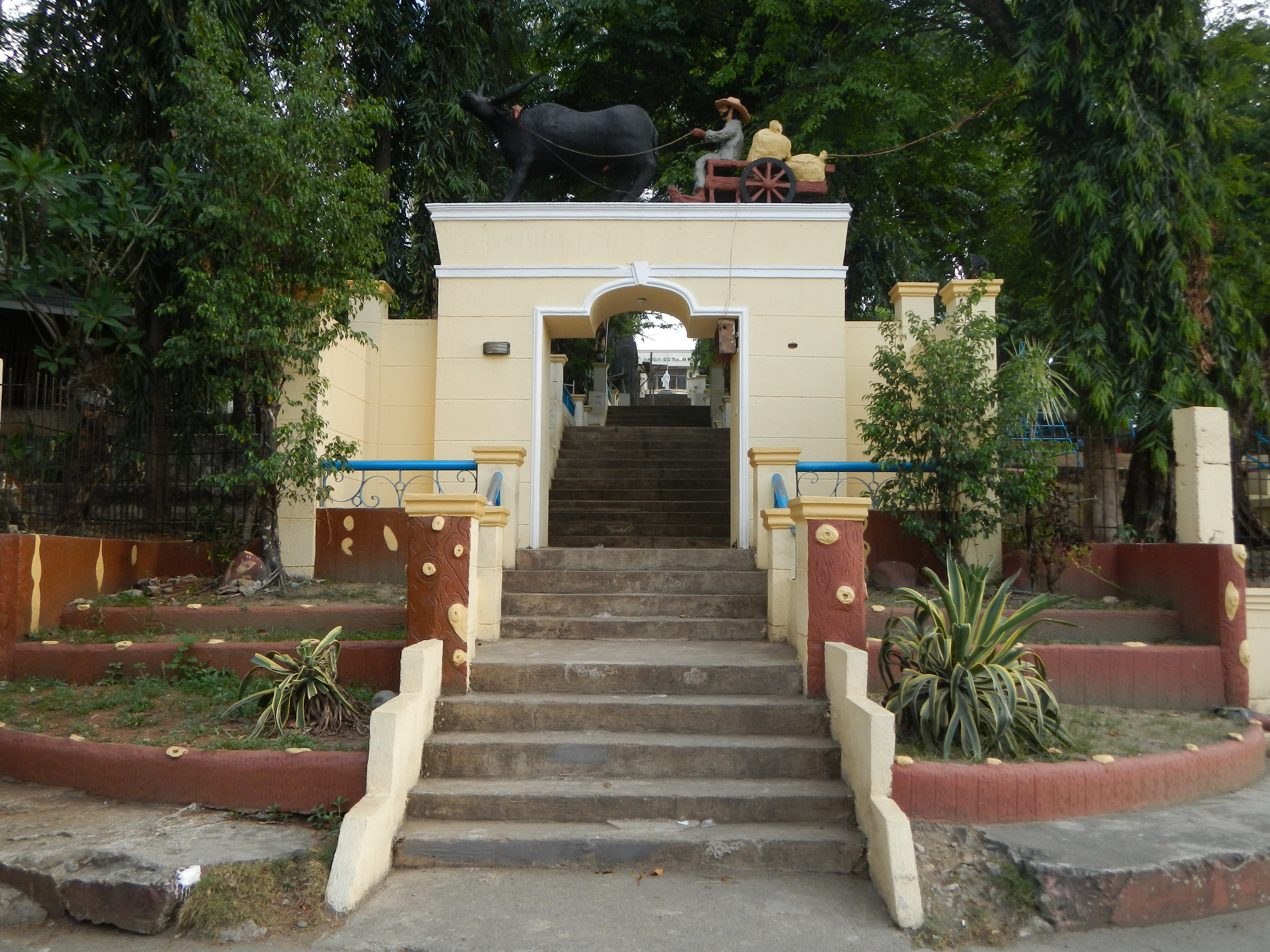
Mayantoc Farmer's Arch (formerly known as Flying A)

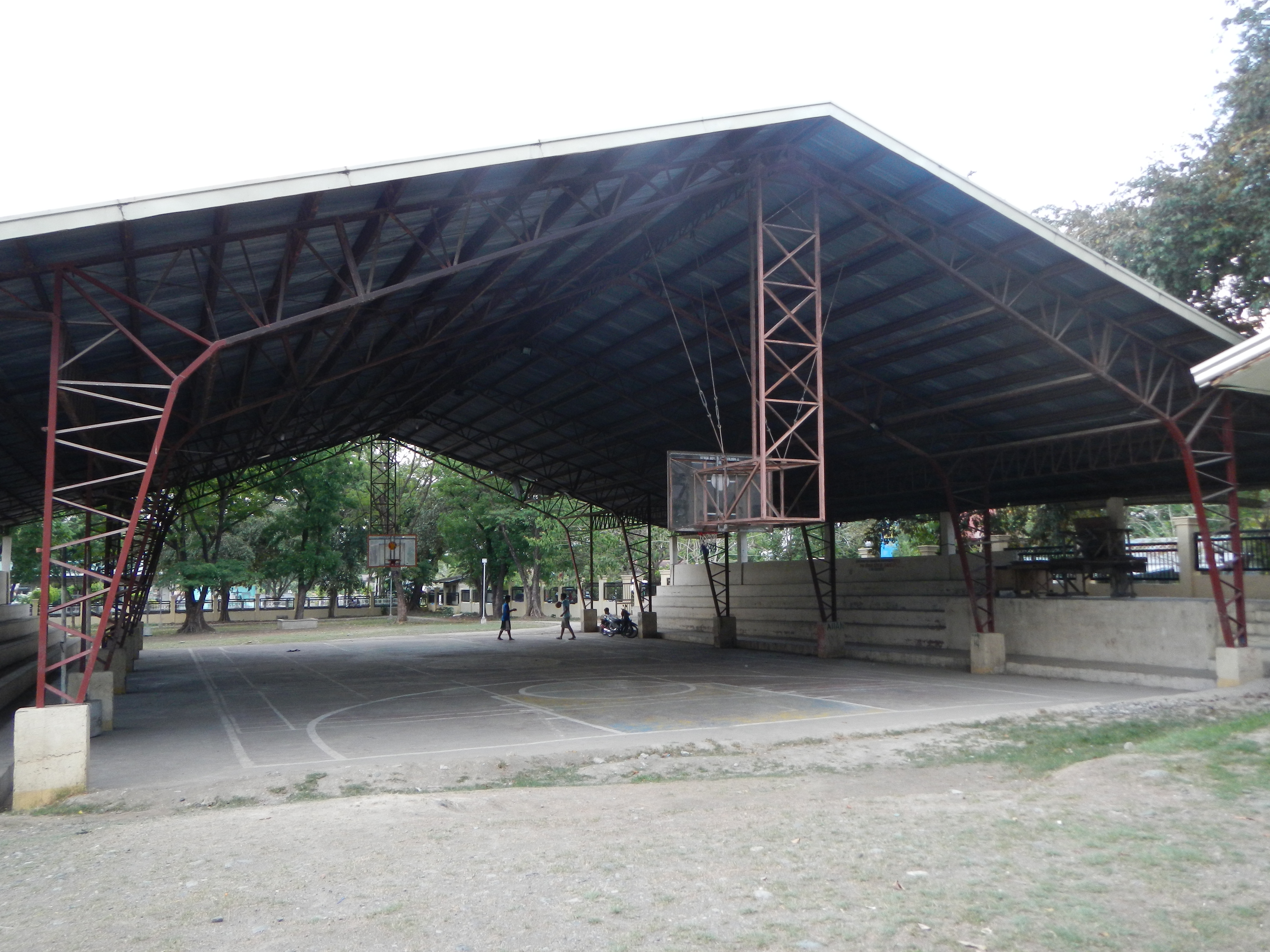
Mayantoc Covered court

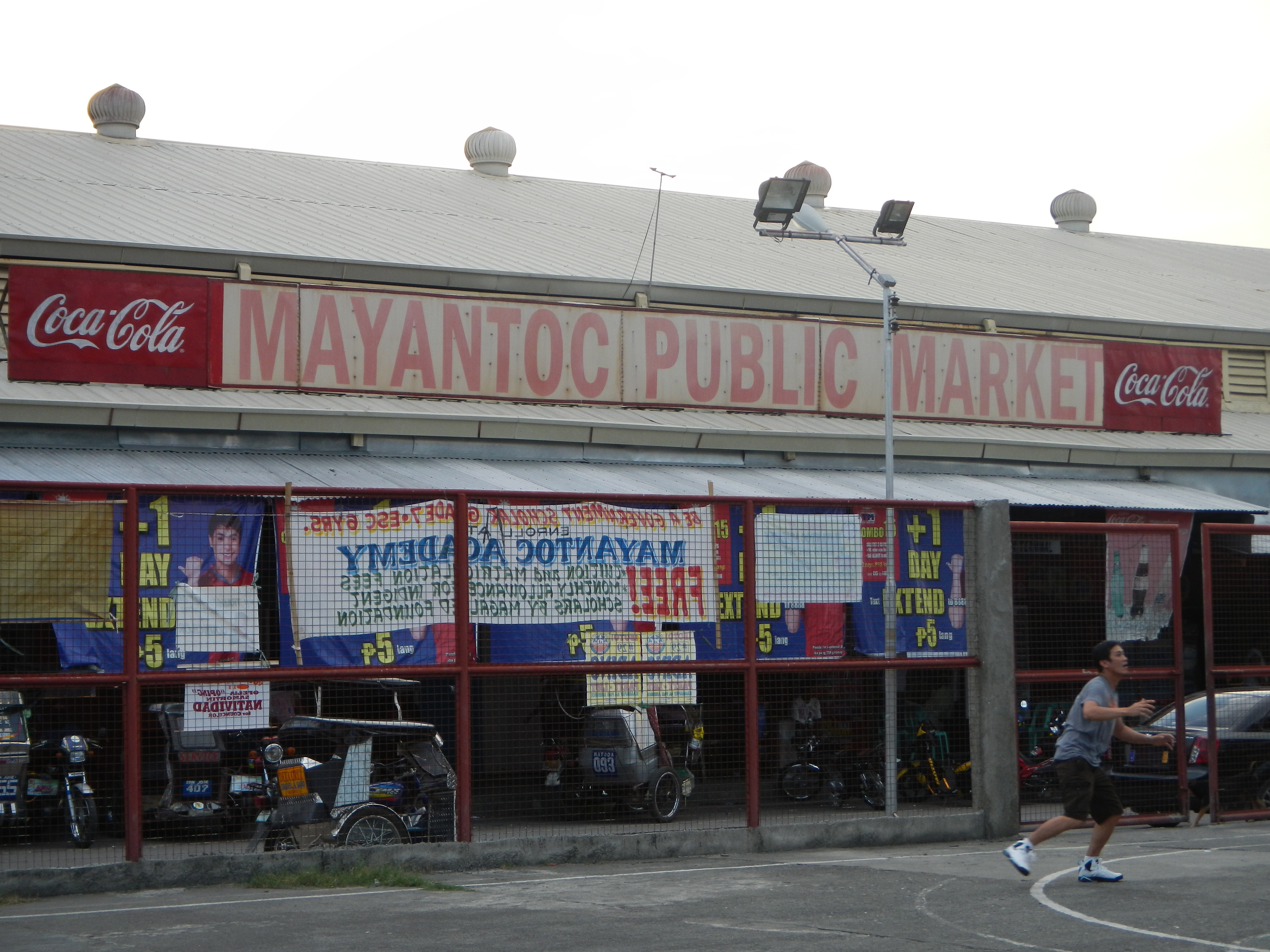
Mayantoc Public market
