= Tarlac's at-large congressional district =

Legislative district of the Philippines

- Former constituency for the House of Representatives of the Philippines, National Assembly of the Philippines, and Batasang Pambansa
- Province: Tarlac
- Region: Central Luzon (1984–1986)

Former constituency
- Created: 1898 (first creation); 1943 (second creation); 1984 (third creation)
- Abolished: 1907 (first abolition); 1945 (second abolition); 1986 (third abolition)

Tarlac's at-large congressional district is an obsolete electoral district that was used for electing members of Philippine national legislatures in Tarlac before 1987.

Tarlac first elected its representatives at-large during the 1898 Philippine legislative election for three seats in the Malolos Congress, the National Assembly of the First Philippine Republic. Following the installation of U.S. civil government in 1901 and the reorganization of provinces for the Philippine Assembly, Tarlac was divided into a first and second district. The provincewide electoral district was re-created ahead of the 1943 Philippine legislative election for a seat in the National Assembly of the Second Philippine Republic, with an additional seat assigned to its provincial governor. The district became inactive again following the restoration of the House of Representatives in 1945 when Tarlac returned to electing its representatives from its two districts. In the unicameral Batasang Pambansa that replaced the House in 1978, Tarlac was included in the multi-member regional electoral district of Region III (Central Luzon) for its interim parliament. The district was again utilized in the 1984 Philippine parliamentary election when Tarlac was granted two seats in the regular parliament.

After 1986, Tarlac elected its representatives from three single-member congressional districts drawn under a new constitution.

== List of members representing the district ==
=== Malolos Congress (1898–1901) ===
Seat A					Seat B					Seat C					Legislature	Constituencies
Portrait	Member (Lifespan)	Term of office	Party	Electoral history	Portrait	Member (Lifespan)	Term of office	Party	Electoral history	Portrait	Member (Lifespan)	Term of office	Party	Electoral history	Legislature	Constituencies
District created June 18, 1898.
	Julian Carpio	September 15, 1898 – March 23, 1901	Nonpartisan	Elected in 1898.		Juan Nepomuceno	September 15, 1898 – March 23, 1901	Nonpartisan	Elected in 1898.		Victoriano Tañedo	September 15, 1898 – March 23, 1901	Nonpartisan	Elected in 1898.	Malolos Congress	1898–1901; Camiling, Gerona, Moncada, Paniqui, Pura
District dissolved into Tarlac's 1st and 2nd districts for the Philippine Assembly.

=== National Assembly (1935–1944) ===
==== Second Republic ====
Seat A					Seat B					Legislature	Constituencies
Portrait	Member (Lifespan)	Term of office	Party	Electoral history	Portrait	Member (Lifespan)	Term of office	Party	Electoral history	Legislature	Constituencies
District re-created September 7, 1943.
	Benigno Aquino Sr. (1894–1947)	September 25, 1943 – February 2, 1944	KALIBAPI	Elected in 1943.		Sergio Aquino	September 25, 1943 – February 2, 1944	KALIBAPI	Appointed as an ex officio member. (Note: As Governor of Tarlac.)	National Assembly (Second Republic)	1943–1944; Anao, Bamban, Camiling, Capas, Concepcion, Gerona, La Paz, Moncada, Paniqui, Pura, Ramos, San Clemente, Santa Ignacia, Tarlac, Victoria
District dissolved into Tarlac's 1st and 2nd districts for the House of Representatives.

=== Batasang Pambansa (1978–1986) ===
Seat A					Seat B					Legislature	Constituencies
Portrait	Member (Lifespan)	Term of office	Party	Electoral history	Portrait	Member (Lifespan)	Term of office	Party	Electoral history	Legislature	Constituencies
District re-created February 1, 1984.
	Homobono Sawit	June 30, 1984 – March 25, 1986	KBL	Elected in 1984.		Mercedes Cojuangco-Teodoro	June 30, 1984 – March 25, 1986	KBL	Elected in 1984.	Regular Batasang Pambansa	1984–1986; Anao, Bamban, Camiling, Capas, Concepcion, Gerona, La Paz, Moncada, Paniqui, Pura, Ramos, San Clemente, Santa Ignacia, Tarlac, Victoria
District dissolved into Tarlac's 1st, 2nd and 3rd districts for the House of Representatives.

== Election results ==
1984 Philippine parliamentary election in Tarlac
Party	Candidate	Votes	%
KBL	Mercedes Cojuangco-Teodoro	222,859	—
KBL	Homobono Sawit	173,883	—
PDP–Laban	Jose Yap Sr.	140,930	—
UNIDO	Edilberto Zarraga	19,486	—
Nacionalista	Enrique Agana Sr.	(?)	—
Independent	Bienvenido Balot	(?)	—
Independent	Benjamin Domingo	(?)	—
Independent	Arsenia Joaquin	(?)	—

== See also ==
- Legislative districts of Tarlac

House of Representatives of the Philippines
Preceded by Negros Occidental's 3rd congressional district	Home district of the speaker of the National Assembly; October 18, 1943 – February 2, 1944	Succeeded by Iloilo's 1st congressional district (as the home district of the speaker of the House of Representatives)
