= Retiring and term-limited incumbents in the 2016 Philippine House of Representatives elections =

These are term limited and retiring members of the House of Representatives of the Philippines during the 16th Congress of the Philippines. Term limited members are prohibited from running in the 2016 elections; they may run for any other positions, or may wait until the 2016 elections.

== From congressional districts ==
=== Centrist Democratic Party ===
1. Rufus Rodriguez (Cagayan de Oro–2nd)
  Running for mayor and lost

=== Lakas–Christian Muslim Democrats ===
1. Dato Arroyo (Camarines Sur–2nd)
2. Thelma Almario (Davao Oriental–2nd)
  Running for Governor and lost to incumbent Representative Nelson Dayanghirang
3. Magtanggol Gunigundo (Valenzuela–2nd)
  Running for Mayor and lost to incumbent Rexlon Gatchalian
4. Victor Francisco Ortega (La Union–1st)
  Running for Mayor of San Fernando City and lost
5. Lani Revilla (Cavite-2nd)
  Running for Mayor of Bacoor City and won
6. Martin Romualdez (Leyte–1st)
  Running for Senator and lost
7. Philip Pichay (Surigao del Sur–1st)

=== Liberal Party ===
1. Ma. Jocelyn Bernos (Abra)
  Running for Governor under National Unity Party and won
2. Herminia Roman (Bataan–1st)
3. Sonny Collantes (Batangas-3rd)
4. Jose Zubiri III (Bukidnon–3rd)
5. Enrico Echiverri (Caloocan-1st)
  Running for Mayor under Nationalist People's Coalition and lost to incumbent Oscar Malapitan
6. Leni Robredo (Camarines Sur-3rd)
  Running for Vice President and won
7. Gabriel Luis Quisumbing (Cebu-6th)
  Running for City Mayor of Mandaue and won
8. Rommel Amatong (Compostela Valley)
  Running for Governor and lost to Jayvee Tyron Uy
9. Isidro Ungab (Davao City–3rd)
10. Franklin Bautista (Davao del Sur–2nd)
  Running for Vice Governor of Davao Occidental and won
11. Joaquin Carlos Rahman Nava (Guimaras)
  Running for Governor and lost to incumbent Samuel Gumarin
12. Vicente Belmonte, Jr. (Iligan)
  Running for City Mayor
13. Niel Tupas, Jr. (Iloilo–5th)
  Running for Vice Governor and lost.
14. Manuel Agyao (Kalinga)
15. Danilo Fernandez (Laguna–1st)
  Running for City Mayor of Santa Rosa and won
16. Imelda Dimaporo (Lanao del Norte-1st)
  Running for Governor
17. Pangalian Balindong (Lanao del Sur–1st)
18. Andres Salvacion (Leyte–3rd)
19. Neptali Gonzales II (Mandaluyong)
20. Benjamin Asilo (Manila–1st)
  Running for Vice Mayor of Manila and lost to Honey Lacuna
21. Marcelino Teodoro (Marikina–1st)
  Running for Mayor of Marikina (under NPC) and won
22. Rodolfo Biazon (Muntinlupa)
23. Joseph Gilbert Violago (Nueva Ecija–2nd)
24. Czarina Umali (Nueva Ecija–3rd)
  Running for Governor and won
25. Roman Romulo (Pasig)
  Running for Senator and lost
26. Arthur Robes (San Jose del Monte)
  Running for Mayor and won
27. Damian Mercado (Southern Leyte)
  Running for Governor and won
28. Francisco Matugas (Surigao del Norte–1st)
29. Guillermo Romarate, Jr. (Surigao del Norte–2nd)
30. Florencio Garay (Surigao del Sur–2nd)
31. Rosendo Labadlabad (Zamboanga del Norte–2nd)

=== Nacionalista Party ===
1. Al Francis Bichara (Albay–2nd)
  Running for Governor and won
2. Nelson Dayanghirang Sr. (Davao Oriental–1st)
  Running for Governor and won
3. Carlos M. Padilla (Nueva Vizcaya)
  Running for Governor and won
4. Lino Cayetano (Taguig City)
  Not Running. Returning to Directorial career.
5. Eleandro Jesus Madrona (Romblon)

=== National Unity Party ===
1. Elpidio Barzaga, Jr. (Dasmariñas)
  Running for Mayor and won
2. Antonio Lagdameo, Jr. (Davao del Norte–2nd)
3. Trisha Bonoan-David (Manila–4th)
  Running for Vice Mayor of Manila and lost to Honey Lacuna
4. Jeffrey Ferrer (UNeGa; Negros Occidental–4th)
  Running for Vice Governor and lost
5. Emil Ong (Northern Samar–2nd)
6. Aleta Suarez (Quezon-3rd)
7. Arnulfo Go (Sultan Kudarat–2nd)
8. Victor Yu (Zamboanga del Sur–1st)

=== Nationalist People's Coalition ===
1. Evelio Leonardia (Bacolod City)
  Running for City Mayor and won
2. Mark Llandro Mendoza (Batangas–4th)
  Running for Governor and lost to Hermilando Mandanas
3. Salvacion Ponce Enrile (Cagayan-1st)
  Not Running
4. Giorgidi Aggabao (Isabela–4th)
5. Josephine Lacson-Noel (Malabon)
  Running for Mayor of Malabon and lost
6. Zenaida Angping (Manila–3rd)
  Running for Vice Mayor of Manila and lost
7. George Arnaiz (Negros Oriental–1st)
8. Pryde Henry Teves (Negros Oriental–2nd)
9. Wilfrido Mark Enverga (Quezon-1st)
10. Sherwin Gatchalian (Valenzuela–1st)
  Running for Senator and won
11. Jules Ledesma (Negros Occidental–1st)

=== United Nationalist Alliance ===
1. Monique Lagdameo (Makati-1st)
  Running for City Vice Mayor and won
2. Abby Binay (Makati–2nd)
  Running for City Mayor and won
3. Amado Bagatsing (KABAKA; Manila–5th)
  Running for Manila Mayor and lost to incumbent Joseph Estrada
4. Manny Pacquiao (PCM; Sarangani)
  Running for Senator and won

== From the party-list system ==
=== 1st Consumer Alliance for Rural Energy ===
1. Michael Angelo Rivera
  Running for Mayor of Padre Garcia, Batangas

=== Abono ===
1. Francisco Emmanuel Ortega III
  Running for Governor of La Union and won

=== A TEACHER ===
1. Mariano Piamonte, Jr.

=== Agricultural Sector Alliance of the Philippines ===
1. Nicanor Briones
  Running for Governor of Batangas ( under PMB/PDP–Laban) and lost to Hermilando Mandanas.

=== Anti-Crime and Terrorism-Community Involvement and Support ===
1. Samuel Pagdilao
  Running for Senator and lost

=== Arts, Business and Science Professionals ===
1. Catalina Leonen-Pizarro

=== Bayan Muna ===
1. Neri Colmenares
  Running for Senator and lost

=== Buhay Hayaang Yumabong ===
1. Irwin Tieng
  Running for Councilor of Manila, 5th District and won

=== Butil Farmers Party ===
1. Agapito Guanlao

=== Citizens' Battle Against Corruption ===
1. Cinchona Cruz-Gonzales

=== Cooperative NATCCO Network Party ===
1. Cresente Paez
  Running for Senator and lost

=== Gabriela Women's Party ===
1. Luzviminda Ilagan

=== Kabataan Partylist ===
1. Terry Ridon

=== OFW Family Club ===
1. Johnny Revilla
2. Roy Señeres
  Running for President and later withdrew. Died on February 9, 2016.

=== Trade Union Congress Party ===
1. Raymond Democrito Mendoza

== Vacancies ==
1. Mel Senen Sarmiento (Samar-1st)
  Appointed Secretary of the Department of the Interior and Local Government

== Deaths ==
1. Enrique Garcia Jr. (Bataan-2nd)
  Died on June 13, 2016
2. Elmer Panotes (Camarines Norte-2nd)
  Died on September 16, 2015
3. Enrique Murphy Cojuangco (Tarlac-1st)
  Died on May 12, 2015
