= Sergio Aquino =

Sergio Aquino may refer to:

- Sergio Aquino (footballer) (born 1979), Argentine–Paraguayan football manager and former player
- Sergio Aquino (politician) (1897–after 1944), Filipino politician
