= Anao, Tarlac =

Municipality in Tarlac, Philippines

Anao
- Municipality
- Municipality of Anao
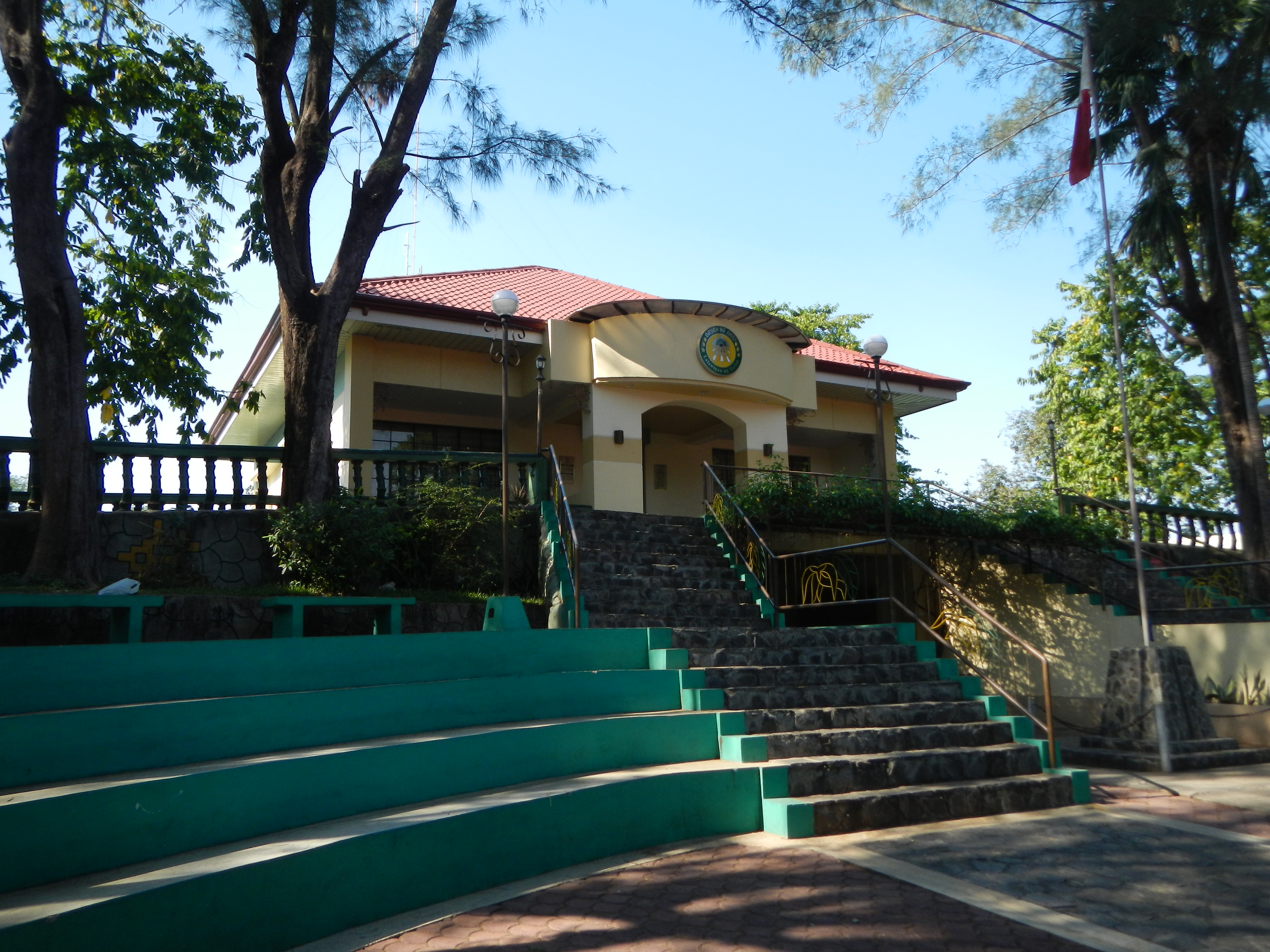
- Municipal Hall

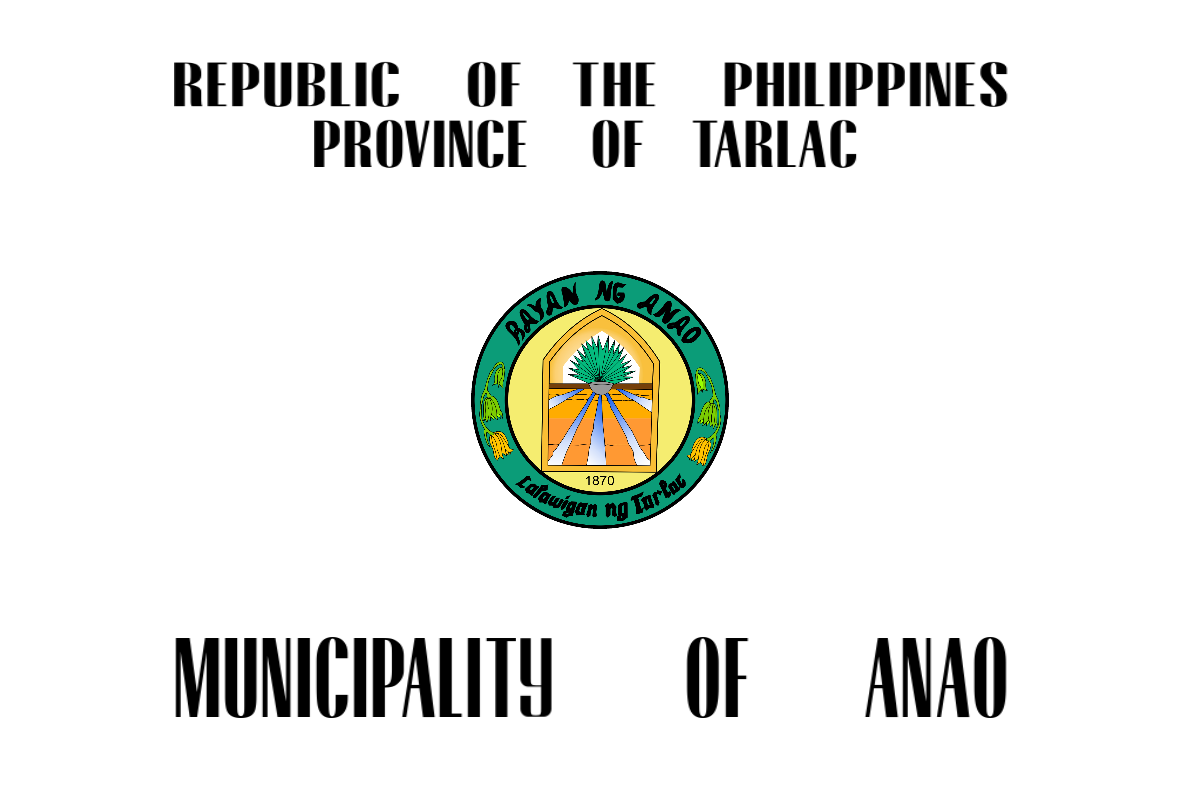
- Flag Seal

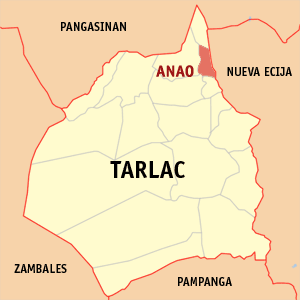
- Map of Tarlac with Anao highlighted
- Interactive map of Anao
- Location within the Philippines
- Coordinates: 15°43′49″N 120°37′35″E
- Country: Philippines
- Region: Central Luzon
- Province: Tarlac
- District: 1st district
- Founded: March 16, 1870
- Barangays: 18 (see Barangays)

Government
  - Type: Sangguniang Bayan
  - Mayor: Gian Pierre O. De Dios
  - Vice Mayor: Jocelyn C. Punzalan
  - Representative: Jaime D. Cojuangco
  - Municipal Council: Members: Arnel S. Oliveros; Chester Philip O. Madiam; Wiliam J. Tabile; Nathaniel Angelo P. Macayanan; Betty B. Lacbayan; Concepcion C. Almazan; Perlita B. Cajulao; Imelda I. Cuchapin
  - Electorate: 8,620 voters (2025)

Area
  - Total: 23.87 km^{2} (9.22 sq mi)
- Elevation: 21 m (69 ft)
- Highest elevation: 34 m (112 ft)
- Lowest elevation: 15 m (49 ft)

Population (2024 census)
  - Total: 12,865
  - Density: 539.0/km^{2} (1,396/sq mi)
  - Households: 3,089

Economy
  - Income class: 4th municipal income class
  - Poverty incidence: 8.5% (2023)
  - Revenue: ₱ 106.8 million (2024)
  - Assets: ₱ 273.7 million (2024)
  - Expenditure: ₱ 106.3 million (2024)
  - Liabilities: ₱ 84.15 million (2024)

Service provider
  - Electricity: Tarlac 1 Electric Cooperative (TARELCO 1)
- Time zone: UTC+8 (PST)
- ZIP code: 2310
- PSGC: 0306901000
- IDD : area code: +63 (0)45
- Native languages: Pangasinan; Ilocano; Tagalog; Kapampangan
- Website: anaotarlac.gov.ph

Anao, officially the Municipality of Anao (Pangasinan: Baley na Anao; Ilocano: Ili ti Anao; Tagalog: Bayan ng Anao; Kapampangan: Balen ning Anao), is a municipality in the province of Tarlac, Philippines. According to the 2024 census, it has a population of 12,865 people, making it the least populated municipality in the province.

Formerly a part of Pangasinan province, Anao was founded and organized into a municipality on March 16, 1870. Every year on March 16, the foundation of the town is celebrated along with the Ylang-Ylang Festival.

== History ==
The area where Anao is located was inhabited before 1800 by people from the Ilocos Region. In 1835, a group of immigrants from Paoay, Ilocos Norte reached the region and first settled near a creek on the bank where there were balete trees. These immigrants called their settlement Balete. The immigrants found the region where they settled to have many agricultural prospects and this attracted more immigrants who came from the north, especially from the town of Paoay.

The settlement expanded and later changed its name to "Barrio Anao" (deriving authentically from the Ilocano word danao which means creek and due to the anahao leaf that grows in various area they derive the name Anao). By that time, balete trees were extinguished and the barrio was adjacent in all directions by creeks.

Paniqui had a road extended towards the east to Anao. Paniqui claimed Anao as its barrio and the people of the barrio accepted the claim. Years went by and Anao expanded. In 1870, a petition was made and approved that Anao be made a municipality.

== Geography ==
The smallest town in terms of land area in the whole of Tarlac, Anao covers a total land area of 23.87 square kilometres (2,387 ha). Anao is 41 kilometres (25 mi) from Tarlac City and 165 kilometres (103 mi) from Manila. Located in the north-eastern part of Tarlac, it is bound on the north by San Manuel, on the east by Nampicuan, on the south by Ramos, on the west by Paniqui, and Moncada.

=== Barangays ===
Anao is politically subdivided into 18 barangays, as shown below. Each barangay consists of puroks and some have sitios.

- Baguindoc (Baguinloc)
- Bantog
- Campos
- Carmen
- Casili
- Don Ramon
- Hernando
- Poblacion
- Rizal
- San Francisco East
- San Francisco West
- San Jose North
- San Jose South
- San Juan
- San Roque
- Santo Domingo
- Sinense
- Suaverdez

=== Climate ===
Climate data for Anao, Tarlac
Month	Jan	Feb	Mar	Apr	May	Jun	Jul	Aug	Sep	Oct	Nov	Dec	Year
Mean daily maximum °C (°F)	30 (86)	31 (88)	33 (91)	35 (95)	33 (91)	31 (88)	30 (86)	29 (84)	29 (84)	30 (86)	31 (88)	30 (86)	31 (88)
Mean daily minimum °C (°F)	19 (66)	19 (66)	20 (68)	22 (72)	24 (75)	24 (75)	24 (75)	24 (75)	23 (73)	22 (72)	21 (70)	20 (68)	22 (71)
Average precipitation mm (inches)	3 (0.1)	2 (0.1)	5 (0.2)	10 (0.4)	80 (3.1)	107 (4.2)	138 (5.4)	147 (5.8)	119 (4.7)	70 (2.8)	26 (1.0)	8 (0.3)	715 (28.1)
Average rainy days	2.0	1.7	2.7	4.6	16.1	20.8	24.0	23.0	21.4	15.5	8.0	3.2	143
Source: Meteoblue

== Demographics ==
Population census of Anao
Year	Pop.	±% p.a.
1903	3,678	—
1918	3,314	−0.69%
1939	3,486	+0.24%
1948	4,453	+2.76%
1960	5,068	+1.08%
1970	6,672	+2.78%
1975	6,084	−1.83%
1980	6,519	+1.39%
1990	7,955	+2.01%
1995	9,240	+2.85%
2000	10,045	+1.81%
2007	10,806	+1.01%
2010	10,873	+0.23%
2015	11,528	+1.12%
2020	12,208	+1.21%
2024	12,865	+1.27%
Source: Philippine Statistics Authority

In the 2024 census, the population of Anao was 12,865 people, with a density of 540 inhabitants per square kilometre or 1,400 inhabitants per square mile.

=== Languages ===
Anao is predominantly an Ilocano-speaking town although most are fluent in Tagalog. Other languages like Kapampangan and Pangasinan are also spoken by most of the population.

=== Religion ===
Aglipayan and Roman Catholicism are two of the predominant religions in the municipality. Other groups having a large number of members in the municipality are the Church of Jesus Christ of Latter-day Saints, Iglesia ni Cristo, and Protestantism.

== Economy ==
Poverty incidence of Anao (%)

Source: Philippine Statistics Authority

== Government ==
=== Past mayors ===
Name	Term Began	Term Ended
Ramon Evangelista	1938	1946
Arcadio Evangelista	1946	1947
Silvestre Sabado	1948	1951
Arcadio Evangelista	1952	1955
Dionisio Dumlao	1960	1963
Catalino O. Cruz	1964	1979
Andres Dela Cruz	1979	1986
Clemente T. Apuan	1988	1998
Rodolfo F. Guerrero	1998	2007
Edgardo S. Felipe	2007	2016
Betty B. Lacbayan	2016	2019
Rafael M. Naral	2019	2022
Gian Pierre O. De Dios	2022	Incumbent

== Tourism ==
The Saint John Nepomucene Parish Church of Anao can be found on the center of the town near the municipal hall. It belongs to the Roman Catholic Diocese of Tarlac.

The Ylang Ylang Festival is celebrated by the municipality every 16 March to take pride of their main local products, which are perfumes and essentials oils made from the ylang-ylang flower. The town has over 10,000 ylang-ylang trees, many of them lined on the local main road, which are harvested and highly valued for its perfume.

== Education ==
The Anao Schools District Office governs all educational institutions within the municipality. It oversees the management and operations of all private and public, from primary to secondary schools.

=== Primary and elementary schools ===
- Anao Catholic School
- Bantog Elementary School
- Casili Elementary School
- Dagundon Elementary School
- Dolores Ongsiako Central Elementary School
- New Life Learning School of San Roque
- San Francisco Elementary School
- San Jose Elementary School

=== Secondary school ===
- Anao National High School

=== Higher educational institutions ===
- Centro Colegio de Tarlac
- Luzon Polytechnic College
- Paniqui Institute of Technology
- Saint Paul College of Technology
- St. Rose College Foundation
- Tarlac College of Agriculture

== Gallery ==
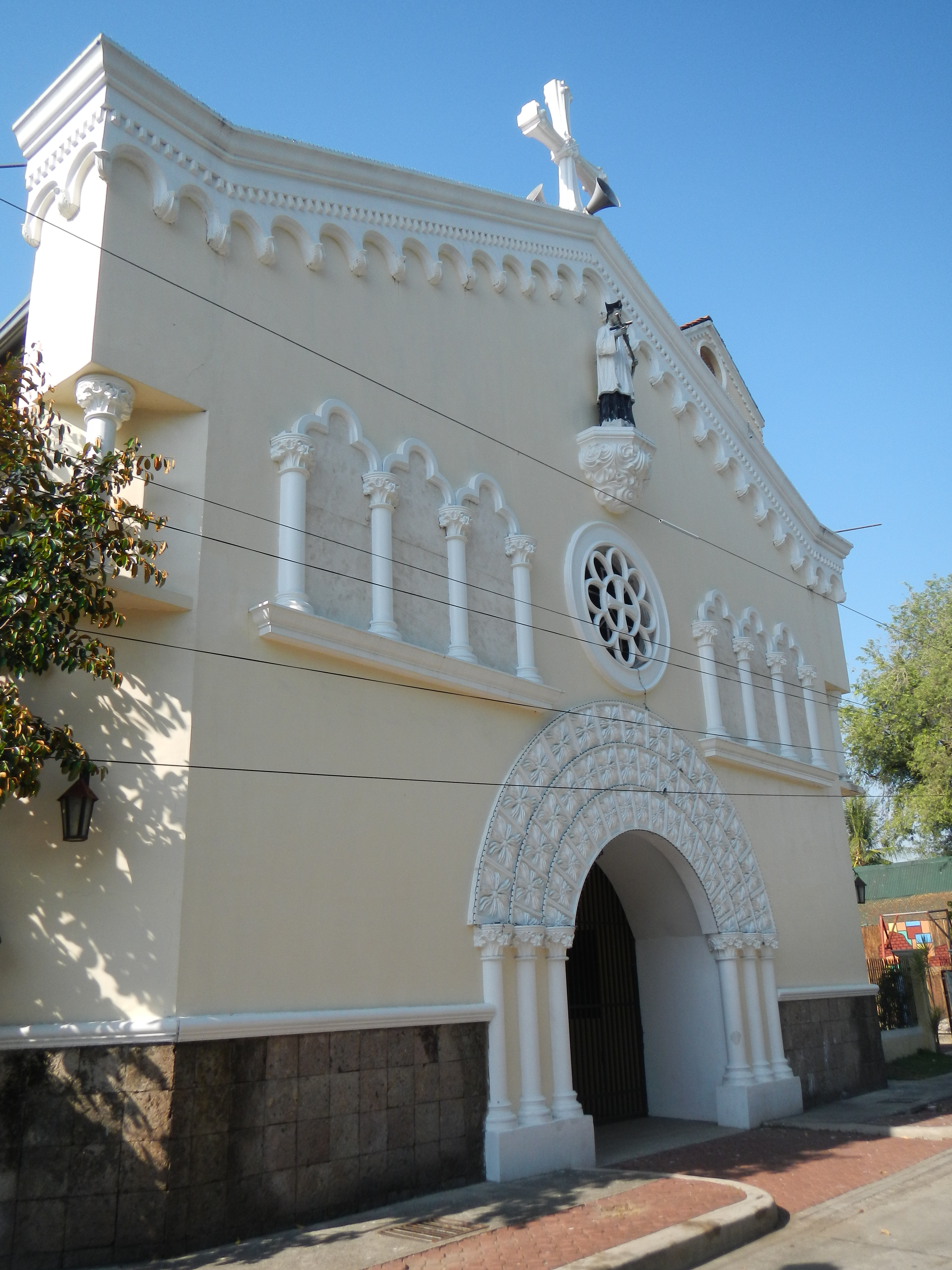
Saint John Nepomucene Parish Church of Anao

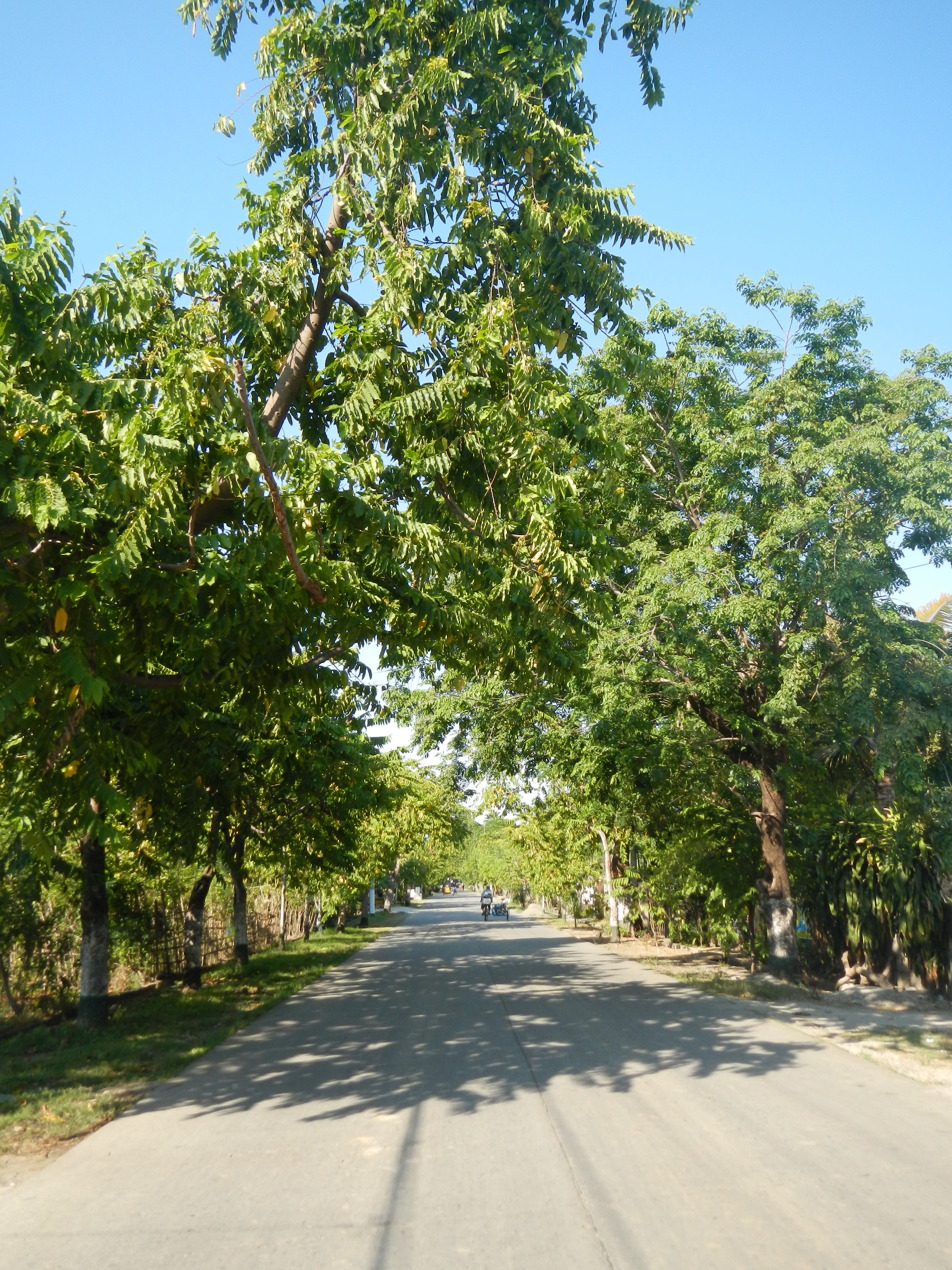
Ylang-ylang trees line all the streets

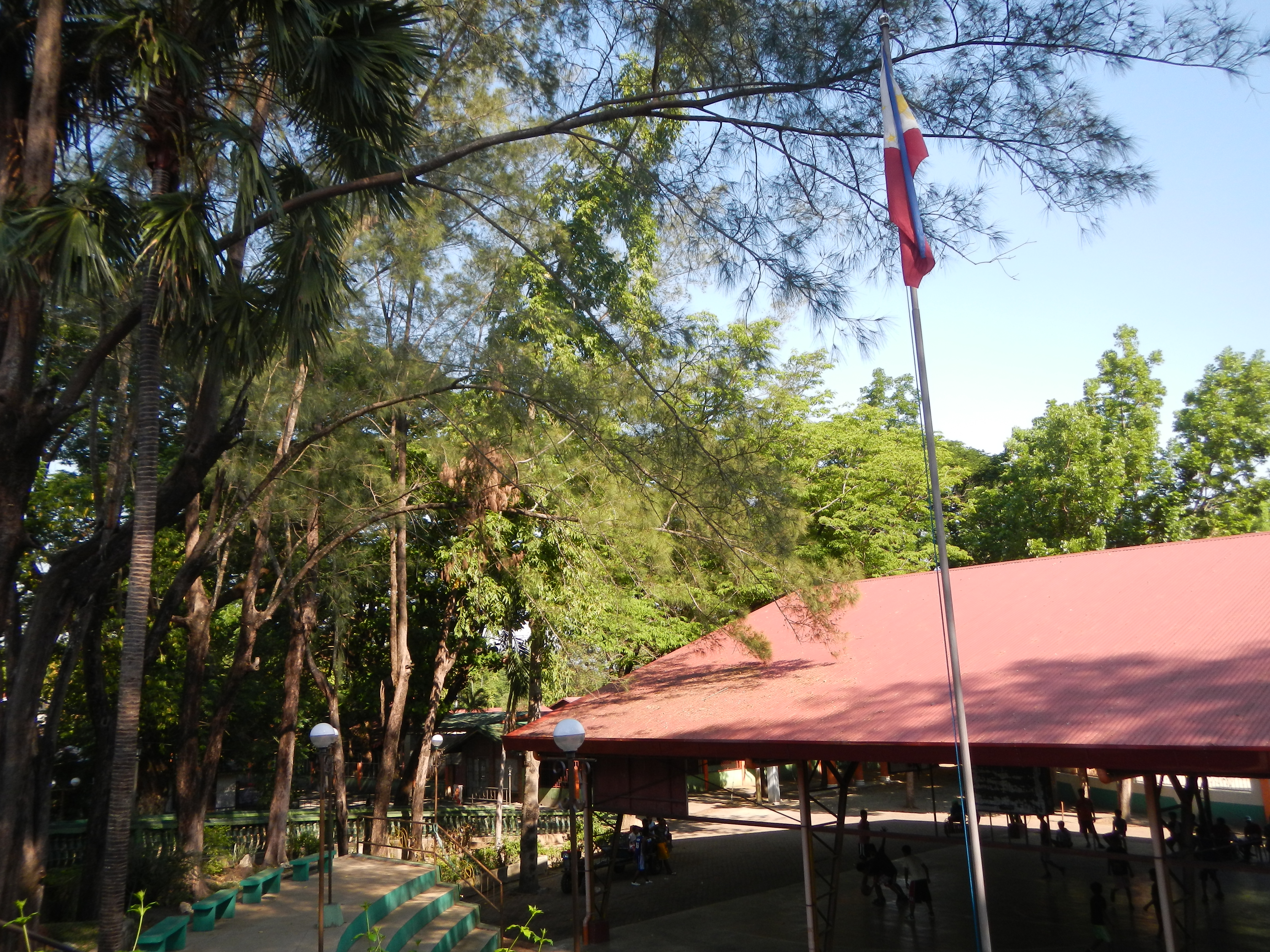
Multi Purpose Covered Court

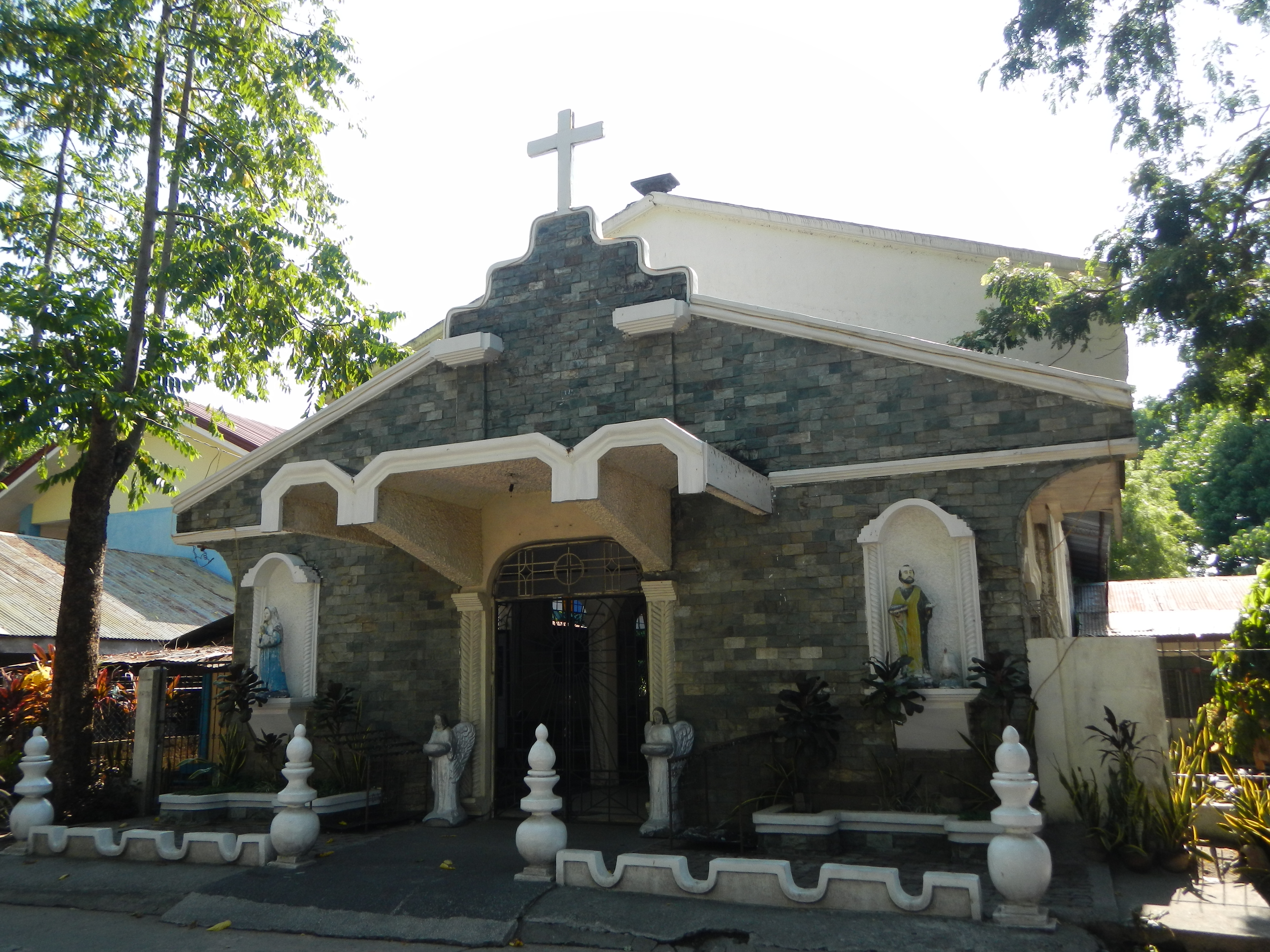
Iglesia Filipina Independiente Church

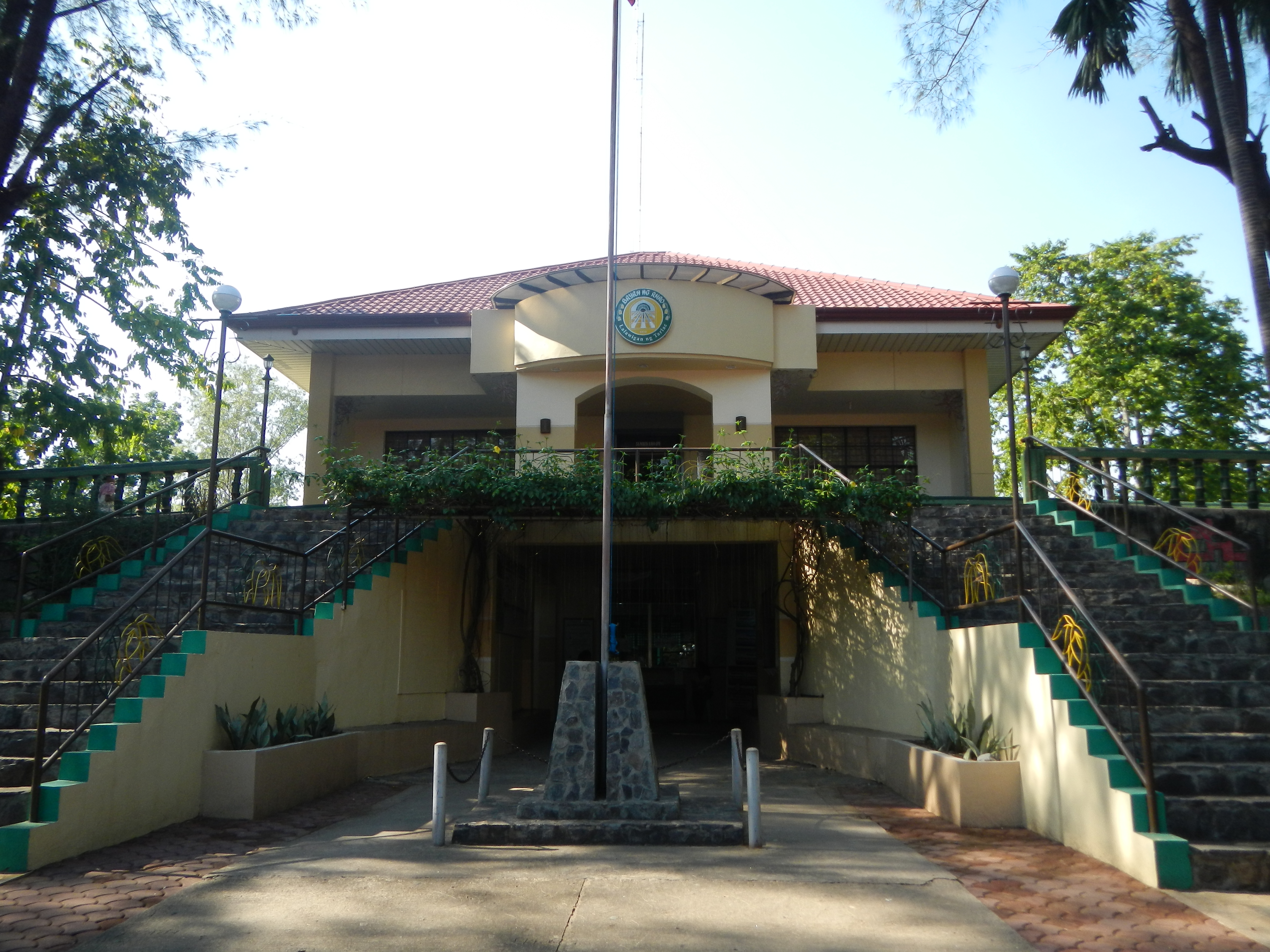
Anao Municipal Building

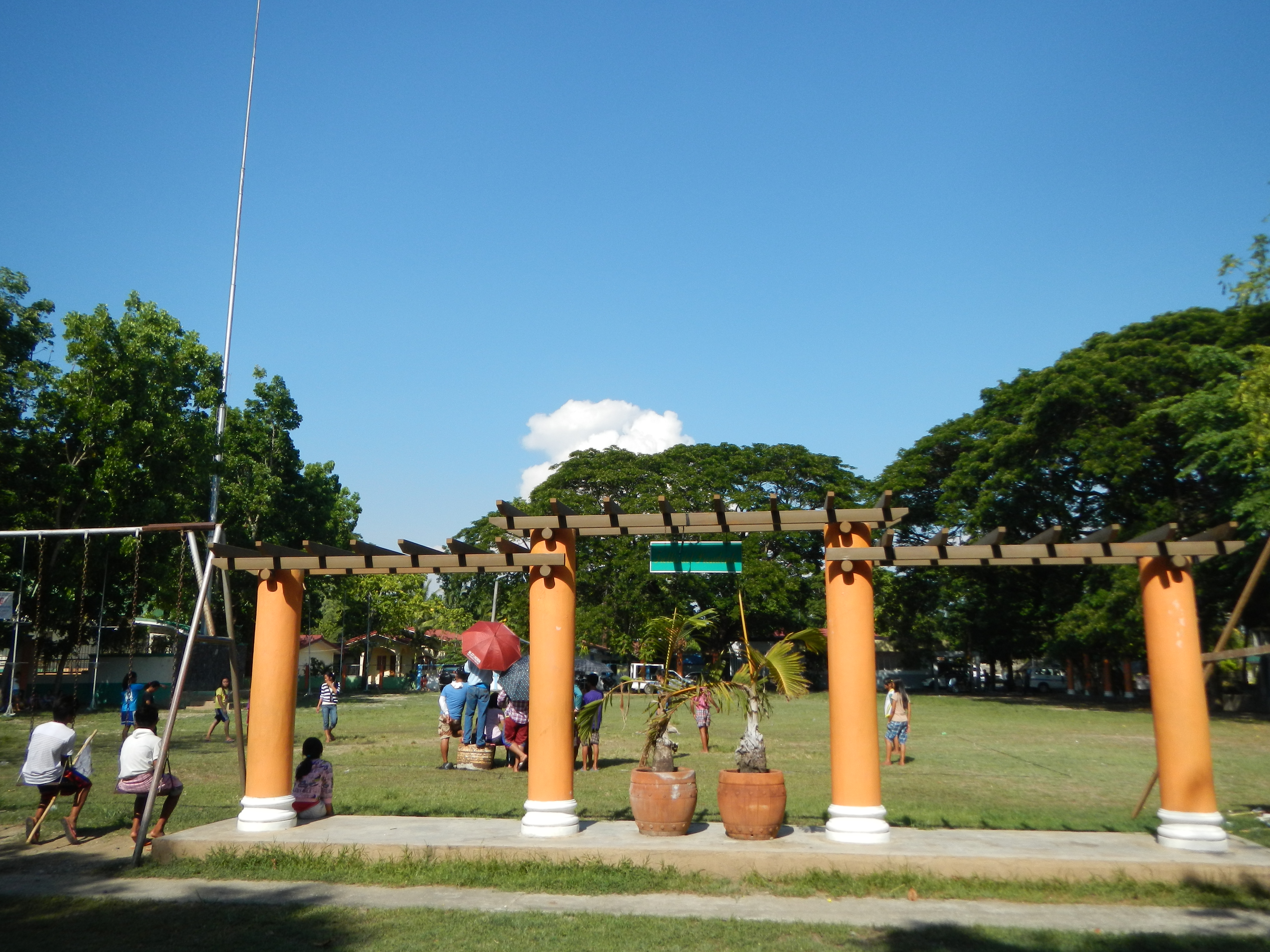
Municipal Open Field

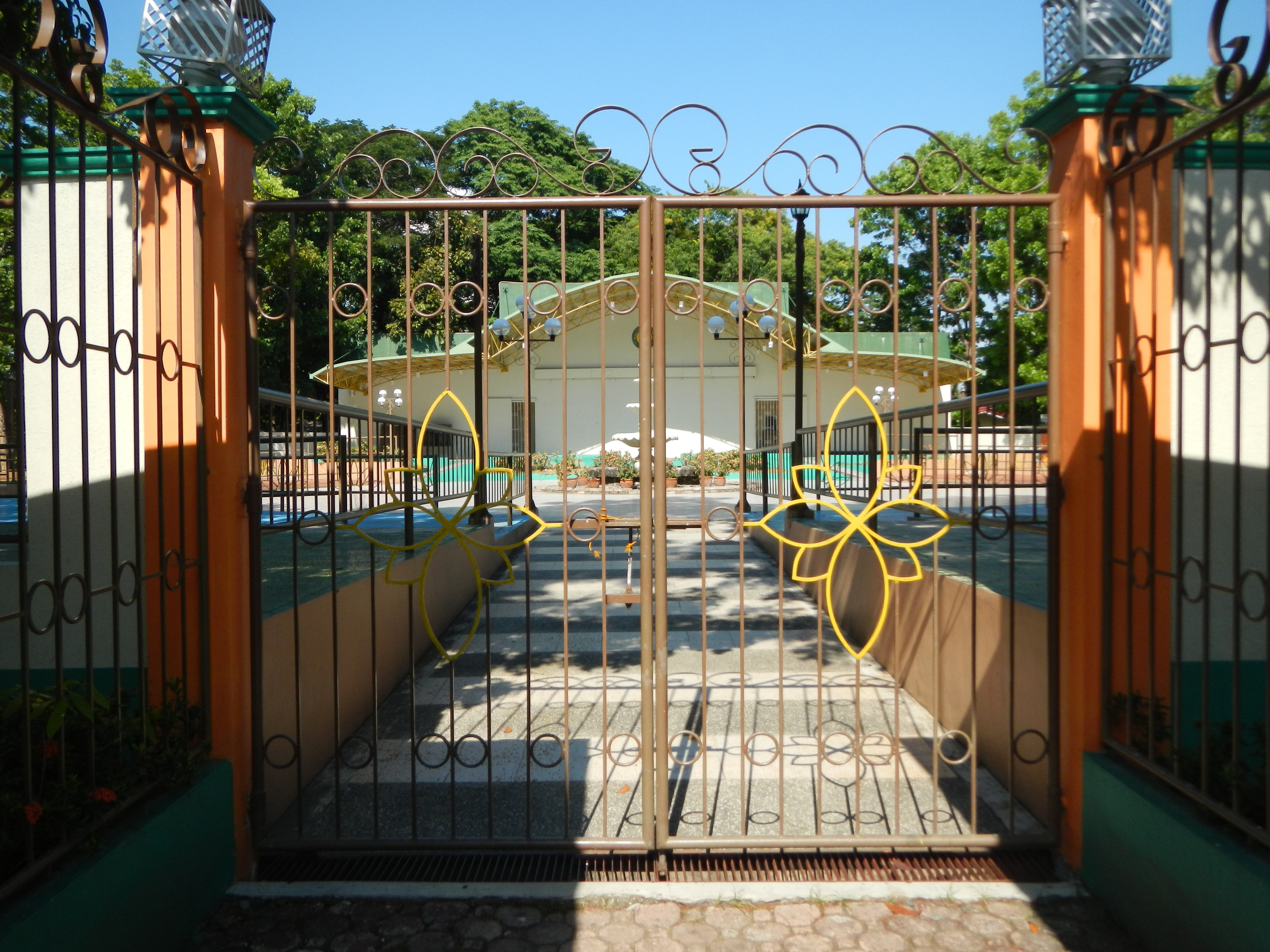
Municipal Auditorium

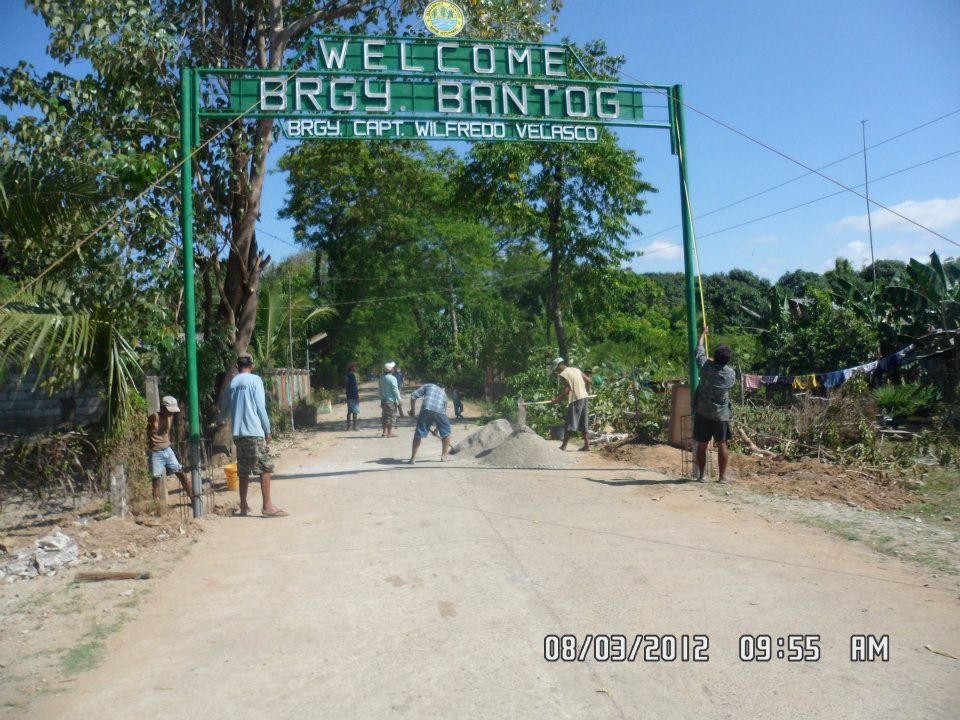
Barangay Bantog ARC

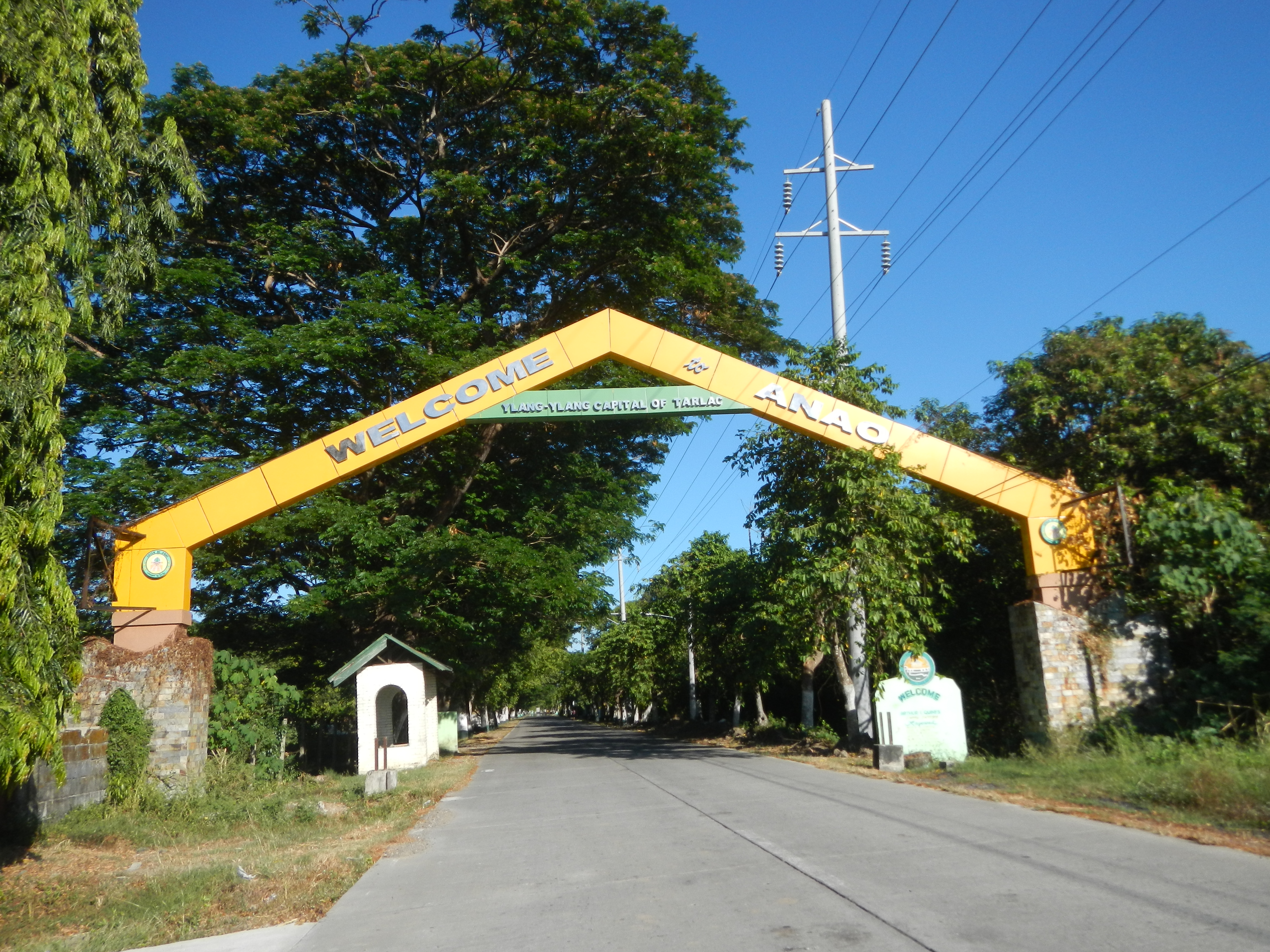
Anao, Welcome ARC at Barangay San Francisco West
