= Tarlac's 1st congressional district =

Legislative district of the Philippines

- Constituency for the House of Representatives of the Philippines
- Map
- Location of Tarlac within the Philippines
- Province: Tarlac
- Region: Central Luzon
- Population: 439,800 (2020)
- Electorate: 286,133 (2022)
- Major settlements: 10 LGUs: Municipalities; Anao; Camiling; Mayantoc; Moncada; Paniqui; Pura; Ramos; San Clemente; San Manuel; Santa Ignacia
- Area: 960.04 km^{2} (370.67 sq mi)

Current constituency
- Created: 1907
- Representative: Jaime Cojuangco
- Political party: NPC
- Congressional bloc: Majority

Tarlac's 1st congressional district is one of the three congressional districts of the Philippines in the province of Tarlac. It has been represented in the House of Representatives of the Philippines since 1916 and earlier in the Philippine Assembly from 1907 to 1916. The district consists of the northern Tarlac municipalities of Anao, Camiling, Mayantoc, Moncada, Paniqui, Pura, Ramos, San Clemente, San Manuel and Santa Ignacia. It is currently represented in the 20th Congress by Jaime Cojuangco of the Nationalist People's Coalition (NPC).

== Representation history ==
#	Image	Member	Term of office		Legislature	Party	Electoral history	Constituent LGUs
#	Image	Member	Start	End	Legislature	Party	Electoral history	Constituent LGUs
=== Tarlac's 1st district for the Philippine Assembly ===
District created January 9, 1907.
1		Melecio Cojuangco	October 16, 1907	March 13, 1909	1st	Progresista	Elected in 1907. Died.	1907–1909; Camiling, Gerona, Moncada, Paniqui, Pura
2		Mauricio Ilagan	October 16, 1909	October 16, 1912	2nd	Nacionalista	Elected in 1909.	1909–1916; Anao, Camiling, Gerona, Moncada, Paniqui, Pura
3		Luís Morales	October 16, 1912	October 16, 1916	3rd	Nacionalista	Elected in 1912.	1909–1916; Anao, Camiling, Gerona, Moncada, Paniqui, Pura
=== Tarlac's 1st district for the House of Representatives of the Philippine Islands ===
(3)		Luís Morales	October 16, 1916	June 6, 1922	4th	Nacionalista	Re-elected in 1916.	1916–1922; Anao, Camiling, Gerona, Moncada, Paniqui, Pura, San Clemente, Santa Ignacia
(3)		Luís Morales	October 16, 1916	June 6, 1922	5th	Nacionalista	Re-elected in 1919.	1916–1922; Anao, Camiling, Gerona, Moncada, Paniqui, Pura, San Clemente, Santa Ignacia
4		Gregorio M. Bañaga	June 6, 1922	June 2, 1925	6th	Demócrata	Elected in 1922.	1922–1935; Anao, Camiling, Gerona, Moncada, Paniqui, Pura, Ramos, San Clemente, Santa Ignacia
5		Sisenando Palarca	June 2, 1925	June 5, 1928	7th	Nacionalista; Consolidado	Elected in 1925.	1922–1935; Anao, Camiling, Gerona, Moncada, Paniqui, Pura, Ramos, San Clemente, Santa Ignacia
(4)		Gregorio M. Bañaga	June 5, 1928	June 2, 1931	8th	Demócrata	Elected in 1928.	1922–1935; Anao, Camiling, Gerona, Moncada, Paniqui, Pura, Ramos, San Clemente, Santa Ignacia
6		Alfonso A. Pablo	June 2, 1931	June 5, 1934	9th	Nacionalista; Consolidado	Elected in 1931.	1922–1935; Anao, Camiling, Gerona, Moncada, Paniqui, Pura, Ramos, San Clemente, Santa Ignacia
7		José Cojuangco	June 5, 1934	September 16, 1935	10th	Nacionalista; Democrático	Elected in 1934.	1922–1935; Anao, Camiling, Gerona, Moncada, Paniqui, Pura, Ramos, San Clemente, Santa Ignacia
#	Image	Member	Term of office		National Assembly	Party	Electoral history	Constituent LGUs
#	Image	Member	Start	End	National Assembly	Party	Electoral history	Constituent LGUs
=== Tarlac's 1st district for the National Assembly (Commonwealth of the Philippines) ===
(7)		José Cojuangco	September 16, 1935	December 30, 1941	1st	Nacionalista; Democrático	Re-elected in 1935.	1935–1941; Anao, Camiling, Gerona, Moncada, Paniqui, Pura, Ramos, San Clemente, Santa Ignacia
(7)		José Cojuangco	September 16, 1935	December 30, 1941	2nd	Nacionalista	Re-elected in 1938.	1935–1941; Anao, Camiling, Gerona, Moncada, Paniqui, Pura, Ramos, San Clemente, Santa Ignacia
District dissolved into the two-seat Tarlac's at-large district for the National Assembly (Second Philippine Republic).
#	Image	Member	Term of office		Common wealth Congress	Party	Electoral history	Constituent LGUs
#	Image	Member	Start	End	Common wealth Congress	Party	Electoral history	Constituent LGUs
=== Tarlac's 1st district for the House of Representatives of the Commonwealth of the Philippines ===
District re-created May 24, 1945.
(7)		José Cojuangco	June 11, 1945	May 25, 1946	1st	Nacionalista	Re-elected in 1941.	1945–1946; Anao, Camiling, Gerona, Moncada, Paniqui, Pura, Ramos, San Clemente, Santa Ignacia
#	Image	Member	Term of office		Congress	Party	Electoral history	Constituent LGUs
#	Image	Member	Start	End	Congress	Party	Electoral history	Constituent LGUs
=== Tarlac's 1st district for the House of Representatives of the Philippines ===
8		Jose Roy	June 4, 1946	December 30, 1961	1st	Liberal	Elected in 1946.	1946–1972; Anao, Camiling, Gerona, Moncada, Paniqui, Pura, Ramos, San Clemente, Santa Ignacia
8		Jose Roy	June 4, 1946	December 30, 1961	2nd	Liberal	Re-elected in 1949.	1946–1972; Anao, Camiling, Gerona, Moncada, Paniqui, Pura, Ramos, San Clemente, Santa Ignacia
8		Jose Roy	June 4, 1946	December 30, 1961	3rd	Democratic	Re-elected in 1953.	1946–1972; Anao, Camiling, Gerona, Moncada, Paniqui, Pura, Ramos, San Clemente, Santa Ignacia
8		Jose Roy	June 4, 1946	December 30, 1961	4th	Nacionalista	Re-elected in 1957.	1946–1972; Anao, Camiling, Gerona, Moncada, Paniqui, Pura, Ramos, San Clemente, Santa Ignacia
9		Jose Cojuangco Jr.	December 30, 1961	December 30, 1969	5th	Nacionalista	Elected in 1961.	1946–1972; Anao, Camiling, Gerona, Moncada, Paniqui, Pura, Ramos, San Clemente, Santa Ignacia
9		Jose Cojuangco Jr.	December 30, 1961	December 30, 1969	6th	Liberal	Re-elected in 1965.	1946–1972; Anao, Camiling, Gerona, Moncada, Paniqui, Pura, Ramos, San Clemente, Santa Ignacia
10		Eduardo Cojuangco Jr.	December 30, 1969	September 23, 1972	7th	Nacionalista	Elected in 1969. Removed from office after imposition of martial law.	1946–1972; Anao, Camiling, Gerona, Moncada, Paniqui, Pura, Ramos, San Clemente, Santa Ignacia
District dissolved into the sixteen-seat Region III's at-large district for the Interim Batasang Pambansa, followed by the two-seat Tarlac's at-large district for the Regular Batasang Pambansa.
District re-created February 2, 1987.
(9)		Jose Cojuangco Jr.	June 30, 1987	June 30, 1998	8th	PDP–Laban	Elected in 1987.	1987–present Anao, Camiling, Mayantoc, Moncada, Paniqui, Pura, Ramos, San Clemente, San Manuel, Santa Ignacia
(9)		Jose Cojuangco Jr.	June 30, 1987	June 30, 1998	9th	LDP	Re-elected in 1992.	1987–present Anao, Camiling, Mayantoc, Moncada, Paniqui, Pura, Ramos, San Clemente, San Manuel, Santa Ignacia
(9)		Jose Cojuangco Jr.	June 30, 1987	June 30, 1998	10th	LDP	Re-elected in 1995.	1987–present Anao, Camiling, Mayantoc, Moncada, Paniqui, Pura, Ramos, San Clemente, San Manuel, Santa Ignacia
12		Gilbert Teodoro	June 30, 1998	June 30, 2007	11th	NPC	Elected in 1998.	1987–present Anao, Camiling, Mayantoc, Moncada, Paniqui, Pura, Ramos, San Clemente, San Manuel, Santa Ignacia
12		Gilbert Teodoro	June 30, 1998	June 30, 2007	12th	NPC	Re-elected in 2001.	1987–present Anao, Camiling, Mayantoc, Moncada, Paniqui, Pura, Ramos, San Clemente, San Manuel, Santa Ignacia
12		Gilbert Teodoro	June 30, 1998	June 30, 2007	13th	NPC	Re-elected in 2004.	1987–present Anao, Camiling, Mayantoc, Moncada, Paniqui, Pura, Ramos, San Clemente, San Manuel, Santa Ignacia
12		Monica Prieto-Teodoro	June 30, 2007	June 30, 2010	14th	NPC	Elected in 2007.	1987–present Anao, Camiling, Mayantoc, Moncada, Paniqui, Pura, Ramos, San Clemente, San Manuel, Santa Ignacia
12		Monica Prieto-Teodoro	June 30, 2007	June 30, 2010	14th	Lakas	Elected in 2007.	1987–present Anao, Camiling, Mayantoc, Moncada, Paniqui, Pura, Ramos, San Clemente, San Manuel, Santa Ignacia
13		Enrique Cojuangco	June 30, 2010	May 12, 2015	15th	NPC	Elected in 2010.	1987–present Anao, Camiling, Mayantoc, Moncada, Paniqui, Pura, Ramos, San Clemente, San Manuel, Santa Ignacia
13		Enrique Cojuangco	June 30, 2010	May 12, 2015	16th	NPC	Re-elected in 2013. Died in office.	1987–present Anao, Camiling, Mayantoc, Moncada, Paniqui, Pura, Ramos, San Clemente, San Manuel, Santa Ignacia
—	vacant		May 12, 2015	June 30, 2016	16th		No special election held to fill vacancy.	1987–present Anao, Camiling, Mayantoc, Moncada, Paniqui, Pura, Ramos, San Clemente, San Manuel, Santa Ignacia
14		Charlie Cojuangco	June 30, 2016	February 22, 2022	17th	NPC	Elected in 2016.	1987–present Anao, Camiling, Mayantoc, Moncada, Paniqui, Pura, Ramos, San Clemente, San Manuel, Santa Ignacia
14		Charlie Cojuangco	June 30, 2016	February 22, 2022	18th	NPC	Re-elected in 2019. Died in office.	1987–present Anao, Camiling, Mayantoc, Moncada, Paniqui, Pura, Ramos, San Clemente, San Manuel, Santa Ignacia
—	vacant		February 22, 2022	June 30, 2022	18th		No special election held to fill vacancy.	1987–present Anao, Camiling, Mayantoc, Moncada, Paniqui, Pura, Ramos, San Clemente, San Manuel, Santa Ignacia
15		Jaime Cojuangco	June 30, 2022	Incumbent	19th	NPC	Elected in 2022.	1987–present Anao, Camiling, Mayantoc, Moncada, Paniqui, Pura, Ramos, San Clemente, San Manuel, Santa Ignacia
15		Jaime Cojuangco	June 30, 2022	Incumbent	20th	NPC	Re-elected in 2025.	1987–present Anao, Camiling, Mayantoc, Moncada, Paniqui, Pura, Ramos, San Clemente, San Manuel, Santa Ignacia

== Election results ==
=== 2025 ===
2025 Philippine House of Representatives elections
Candidate	Party	Votes	%
Jaime Cojuangco (incumbent)	Nationalist People's Coalition	182,032	100.00
Total		182,032	100.00
Valid votes		182,032	72.86
Invalid/blank votes		67,821	27.14
Total votes		249,853	100.00
Registered voters/turnout		285,992	87.36
Nationalist People's Coalition hold			
Source: Commission on Elections

=== 2022 ===
2022 Philippine House of Representatives elections
Party	Candidate	Votes	%
NPC	Jaime Cojuangco	191,827	94.52
Independent	Joseph Ramac	11,127	5.48
Valid ballots		202,954	82.39
Invalid or blank votes		43,390	17.61
Total votes		246,344	100.00
NPC hold			

=== 2019 ===
2019 Philippine House of Representatives elections
Party	Candidate	Votes	%
NPC	Charlie Cojuangco	157,788	100.00
Valid ballots		157,788	73.13
Invalid or blank votes		57,976	26.87
Total votes		215,764	100.00
NPC hold			

=== 2016 ===
2016 Philippine House of Representatives elections
Party	Candidate	Votes	%
NPC	Charlie Cojuangco	151,199	72.56
Independent	Cristino Diamsay	7,859	3.77
Invalid or blank votes		49,331	23.67
Total votes		208,389	100.00
NPC hold			

=== 2013 ===
2013 Philippine House of Representatives elections
Party	Candidate	Votes	%
NPC	Enrique Cojuangco	112,506	69.08
Invalid or blank votes		50,365	30.92
Total votes		162,871	100.00
NPC hold			

=== 2010 ===
2010 Philippine House of Representatives elections
Party	Candidate	Votes	%
NPC	Enrique Cojuangco	149,520	94.97
Philippine Green Republican Party	Efren Dancel Inocencio	7,918	5.03
Valid ballots		157,438	85.50
Invalid or blank votes		26,694	14.50
Total votes		184,132	100.00
NPC gain from Lakas–Kampi			

=== 2007 ===
2007 Philippine House of Representatives elections
Party	Candidate	Votes	%
NPC	Monica Prieto-Teodoro	103,495	94.73
KAMPI	Lucia Manuel	4,106	3.76
Independent	Leny Mauricio	1,646	1.51
Total votes		109,247	100.00
NPC hold			

=== 2004 ===
2004 Philippine House of Representatives elections
Party	Candidate	Votes	%
NPC	Gilbert Teodoro	111,068	100.00
Total votes		111,068	100.00
NPC hold			

=== 2001 ===
2001 Philippine House of Representatives elections
Party	Candidate	Votes	%
NPC	Gilbert Teodoro	87,278	92.91
KAMPI	Armando Lambino	6,658	7.09
Total votes		93,936	100.00
NPC hold			

== See also ==
- Legislative districts of Tarlac
