= Jose Roy =

Filipino lawyer and politician (1904–1986)

The Honorable Jose J. Roy
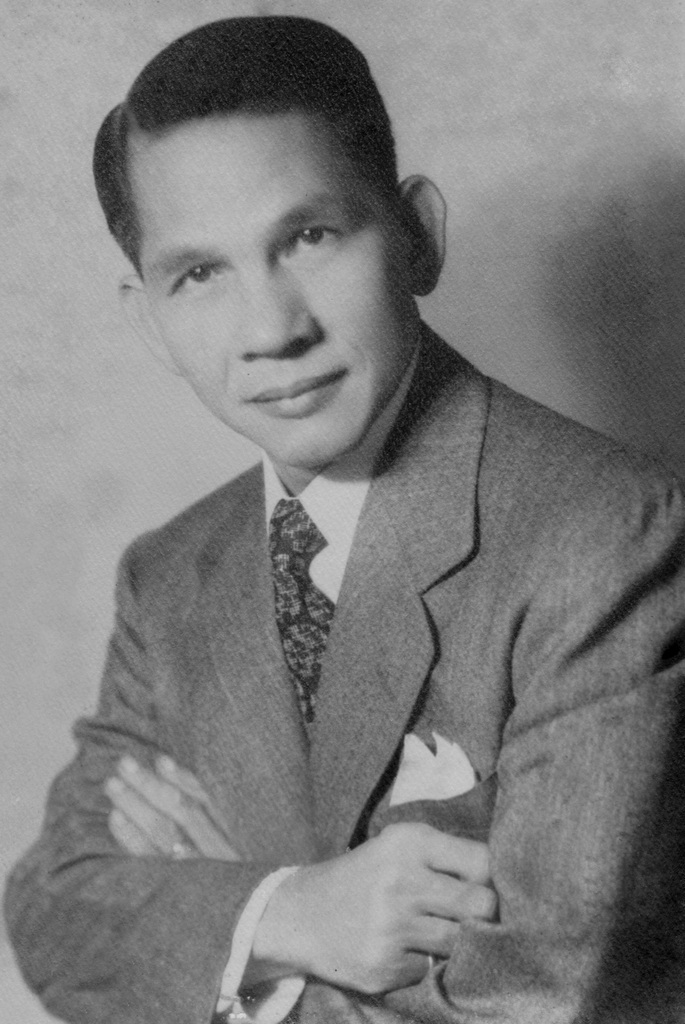

President pro tempore of the Senate of the Philippines
- In office January 22, 1968 – September 23, 1972
- Preceded by: Camilo Osías
- Succeeded by: Abolished next held by Teofisto Guingona Jr. in 1987

Senate Majority Leader
- In office January 17, 1966 – January 26, 1967
- Preceded by: Arturo Tolentino
- Succeeded by: Rodolfo Ganzon

Senator of the Philippines
- In office December 30, 1961 – September 23, 1972

Member of the Philippine House of Representatives from Tarlac's 1st district
- In office June 4, 1946 – December 30, 1961
- Preceded by: José Cojuangco
- Succeeded by: Peping Cojuangco

6th President of the Nacionalista Party
- In office 1970–1986
- Preceded by: Gil Puyat
- Succeeded by: Salvador Laurel

Personal details
- Born: Jose de Jesus Roy; July 19, 1904 Moncada, Tarlac, Philippine Islands
- Died: March 14, 1986 (aged 81) Philippines
- Resting place: Loyola Memorial Park Marikina, Philippines
- Party: Nacionalista (1957–1986)
- Other political affiliations: Democratic (1953–1957); Liberal (1946–1953)
- Spouse: Consolacion Domingo (m. 1932)
- Children: 3
- Relatives: Jose M. Roy III (grandson); Gilberto Duavit Jr. (grandson); Jack Duavit (grandson); Karl S. Roy (grandson)
- Education: University of the Philippines College of Law (LL.B)
- Profession: Lawyer, Banker, Politician

Jose de Jesus Roy Sr. (July 19, 1904 – March 14, 1986) was a Filipino lawyer, economist, and politician who served for 25 consecutive years as a congressman and senator in the Congress of the Philippines. Known as the "poor man's economist", he drafted, authored and sponsored laws to improve the lot of the peasantry. As a member of Congress, he took particular pride in the sponsorship of almost all laws on land reform. He is also considered to be the "Father of the Philippine Banking System" because of his authorship and involvement in almost all the major finance and tariff measures since the beginning of the Third Philippine Republic in 1946.

== Early life ==
Roy was born and raised in Moncada, Tarlac. His family were tenant farmers and he attended public schools. As a young boy, his first ambition was to become a writer and one of the topics he wrote on for a school paper was crop-sharing. Seeing and much affected by the oppression surrounding the farmers around him, he thought crop-sharing would be the best remedy for the life of disparity that existed between the wealthy landlords and the poverty-stricken tenant farmers.

Roy worked his way through college and graduated from the University of the Philippines with a Bachelor of Laws degree in 1930. To help finance his studies he worked as a clerk in the Bureau of Civil Service and rose to the position of examiner. With his knowledge of Spanish, English, Filipino, Ilocano and Pampango, he became the deputy secretary and interpreter in the Public Service Commission.

While still a law student, he was a known campus leader and orator for which distinctions he was the recipient of several medals. Roy carried over this leadership when he ran for Representative for the first district of Tarlac under the Liberal Party.

After passing the Bar Examination in 1930, Roy was appointed Special Attorney in the Public Service Commission. He was just one of three public utility practitioners who specialized in transportation. The following year Roy resigned his position in the commission and went into private practice as a corporate lawyer. In 1936 he expanded his practice organizing mining corporations during the mining boom. His career flourished until the Second World War broke out in December 1941. In 1942 Jose Roy retired his practice to join the resistance movement during the war.

== Political career ==
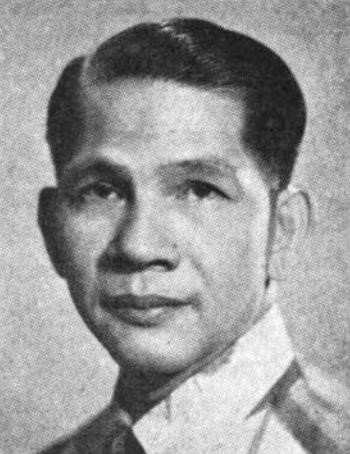
Roy official portrait during the 3rd Congress.

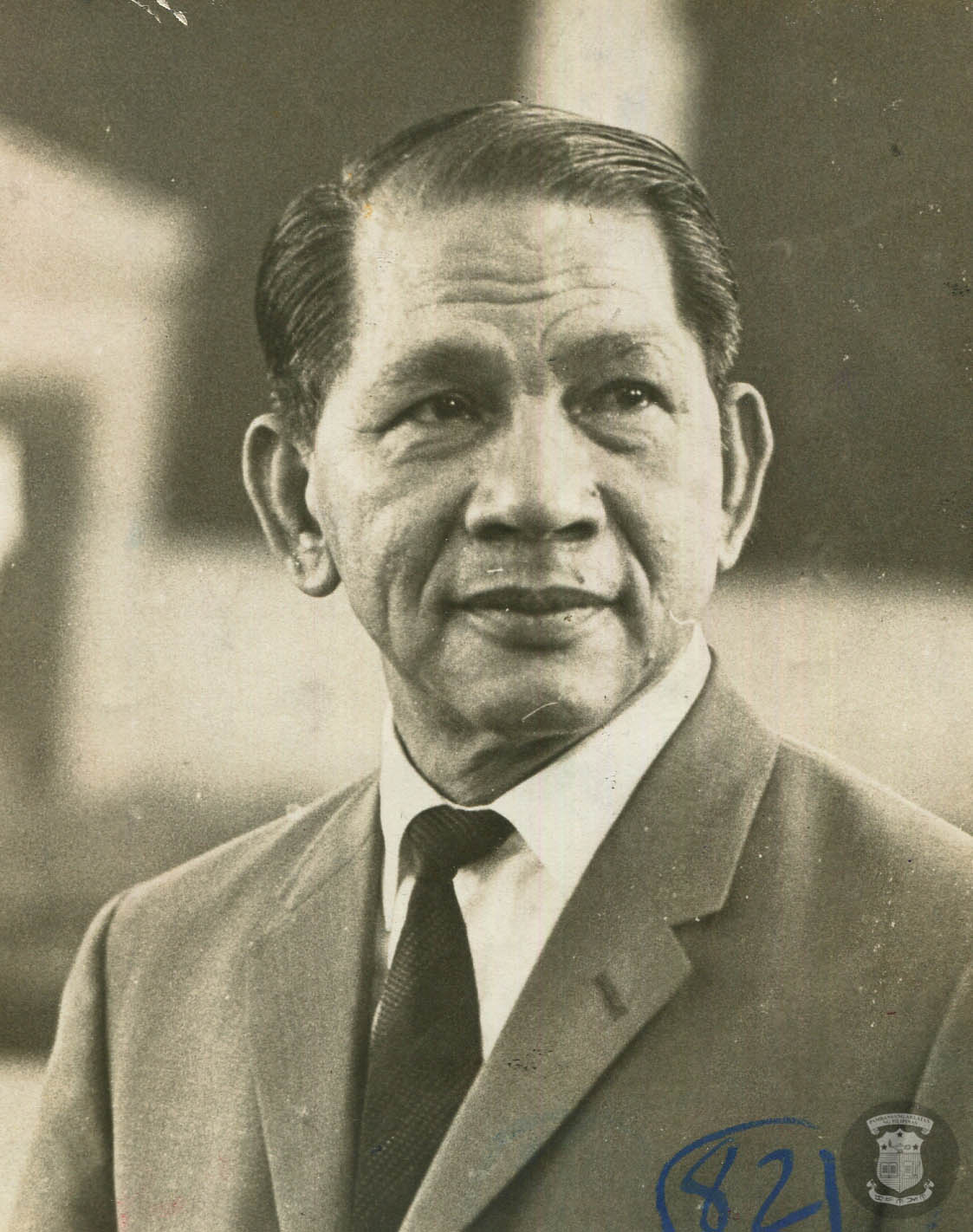
Roy as senator, c. 1965

After the war in 1946, the first elections were held. The Liberal presidential nominee that time was then-Senator Manuel Roxas, who persuaded Roy to run for Congress seat. Roy agreed only after being promised that if they won, Roxas would consider supporting the 70-30 Rice Crop Sharing law he was planning to author. This law would provide that 70% of the rice crop be given to the tenant farmers and 30% to the landowners in all rice-producing regions of the Philippines and, after studying the matter, Roxas found that it had its merits. The 1946 election was a very difficult one. Roy was elected to congress as representative of the 1st district of Tarlac. He was the lone Liberal Party candidate to win in Central Luzon.

Over the next 16 years, Roy was elected to four consecutive terms as congressman of Tarlac's 1st District. He was instrumental in the drafting and passage of important finance and socio-economic measures which he authored and sponsored on the floor of the House of Representatives from 1946 to 1961, among which are; the Central Bank Act, Rehabilitation Finance Corporation Act (R.A.85), the Development Bank Act (R.A.2081, the General Banking Act (R.A.337), the Rural Banks Act (R.A.720), Philippine Veterans Bank Act (R.A.3518), the Philippines Deposit Insurance Corporation Act (R.A.3591); the Industrialization Act (R.A.901); Ramie Incentive Act, Agricultural Tenancy Act, 70-30 Rice Share Tenancy Act, Land Tenure Act, the Land Reform Code (R.A.3844), the Anti-Graft and Corrupt Practices Act (RA3019), Savings and Loan Association Act (R.A.3799), the Congressional 5-Year Development Plan, Tax Exemption to Basic Industries, Laurel-Langley Agreement, the Tariff and Customs Code of 1957, an Act providing the creation, organization and operation of an internal audit service for all departments, bureaus and offices of the National government otherwise known as the Internal Audit Act (R.A.3456) are among some of the measures he had authored and sponsored. He was a member of the Philippine Council of Leaders, the Development Council, the Council of State and Security Council.

In the general election of 1961, Roy was elected as senator for the Fifth Congress. He was one of only two Nacionalista Party senatorial candidates who was elected. In the November 14, 1967 Senate election, Roy garnered the highest number of votes in his re-election bid for senator receiving over 51 percent of the votes and more than half a million votes over his nearest pursuer. He was the lone incumbent to defend his seat. The Nacionalista Party won seven of the eight possible senate seats. As senator, Roy was elected as the Majority Floor Leader and later that year President Pro-tempore of the Sixth Congress in 1966 and President Pro-tempore of the Seventh Congress. He was a member of the Commission on Appointments and chaired the Committee on Ways and Means, Committee on Rules and Foreign Relations Committee As President Pro-tempore, Roy urged then President Ferdinand Marcos to reduce the power of various political warlords throughout the country by forcing them to disband their private armies. His efforts failed, however, and the Seventh Congress was eventually abolished when Marcos declared martial law in 1972.

== Other ==
Roy had the distinction of being the only legislator in both houses to serve continuously for 25 years. He never lost an election. Roy was the only member of Congress who was chosen as one of the Ten Best Congressmen each year from 1948 to 1961 by civic organizations, members of the press and national periodicals. An experienced speaker and debater who had a knack for explaining the intricacies of economics, banking and finance in terms understandable to the masses, he was quite popular with the Filipino people. In his time, Roy was a frequent delegate to international conferences. He represented the country as a delegate to the United Nations in 1950, 1952, 1968 and 1969. In 1952, he was a delegate to the International Monetary Fund and World Bank Conference in Mexico City, and in Washington DC in 1954 and 1956. He was the guest speaker in the Far East Conference and the Far East-American Council of Commerce and Industry in New York City in 1952. He was also delegate of the Philippine Economic Mission for the revision of the Phil-US Trade Act in Washington DC in 1954. Roy was designated a member of the 5-man Presidential Committee which drafted the final revision of the Bell Act. In 1958, by invitation of Her Majesty's Government, Roy was an official guest of the British Government for a goodwill tour of the United Kingdom. In 1960, Roy made an economic survey of Scandinavian countries and of Western Europe. In 1962 he was a member of the Philippine delegate to the Inter-Parliamentary Congress Conference in Brazilia, Brazil. Member of the Joint Phil-US Veterans Commission to Washington DC. Roy headed the 1969 Philippine delegation to the Inaugural Conference of the Asian Coconut Community in Ceylon and delegate to the 1970 Pacific Asia Conference of Ministers in Jakarta and the SEATO Ministers conference in Manila.

Roy was a lifetime member of the Philippine Historical Society, Knight Commander of the Knights of Rizal, president of the Philippine Philatelic Association as well as a lifetime member of several veterans' organizations. He was the chairman of the 5th General Conference of the World Anti-Communist League and a member of the Asian People Anti-Communist League. Roy also served as chairman of the board of trustees of the Angeles University Foundation, a university in Angeles, Pampanga.

Outside of public service, Roy remained a stalwart of the Philippine Bar. He was one of the moving spirits of the Integrated Bar of the Philippines and was elected president of the Philippine Lawyers Association in 1968 while managing Jose J. Roy and Associates Law Offices.

== Personal life ==
Jose de Jesus Roy Sr. was married to Consolacion Ruiz Domingo (Dec. 26, 1910 - Aug. 5, 1992) and had three children, Jose Domingo Roy Jr., Vilma Domingo Roy-Duavit and Ronald Domingo Roy.

== Death ==
Jose Roy died on March 14, 1986. He is buried beside wife Consolacion Ruiz Domingo at Loyola Memorial Park.

== Gallery ==
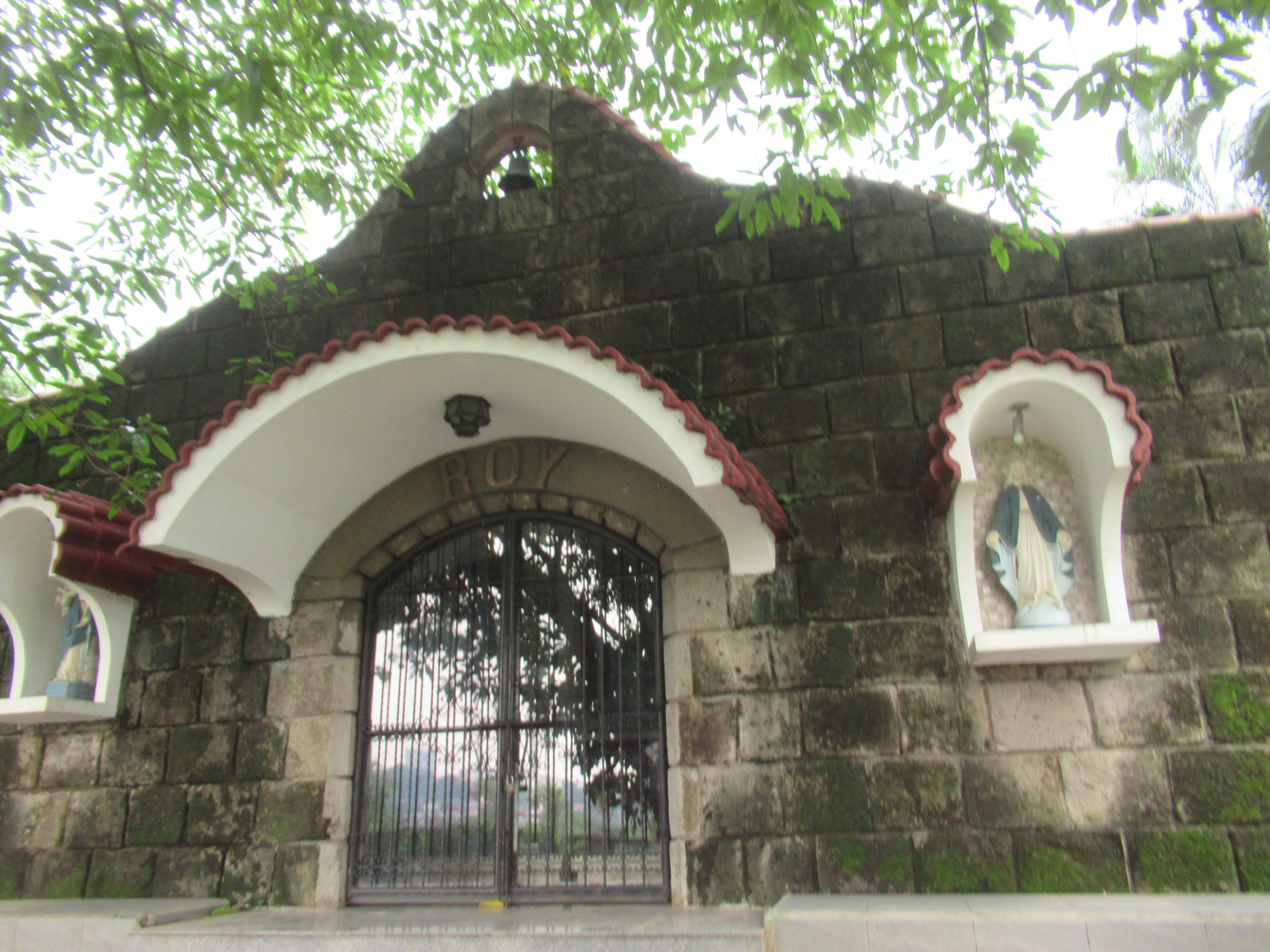
Jose Roy mausoleum

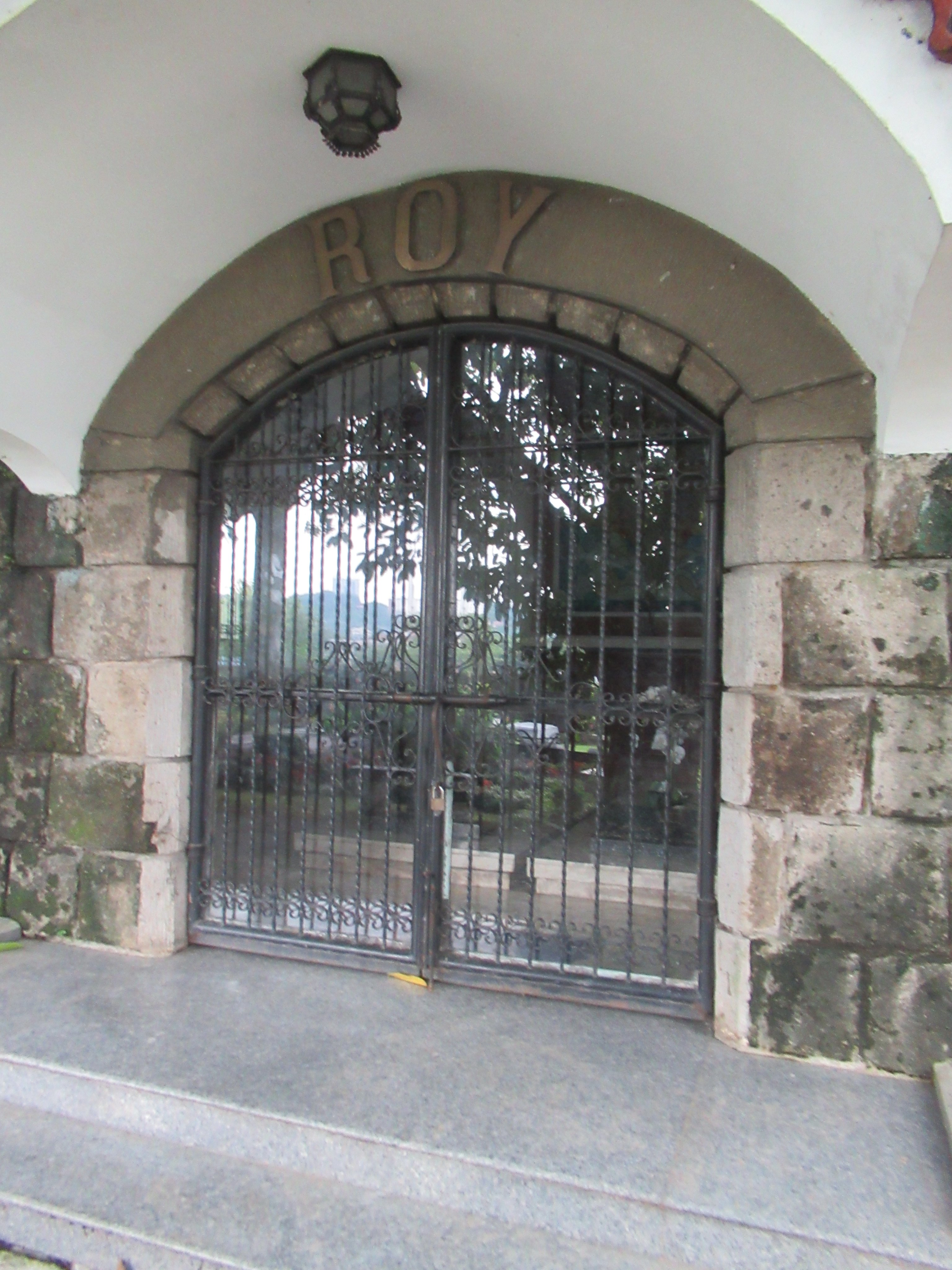
Jose Roy mausoleum 2

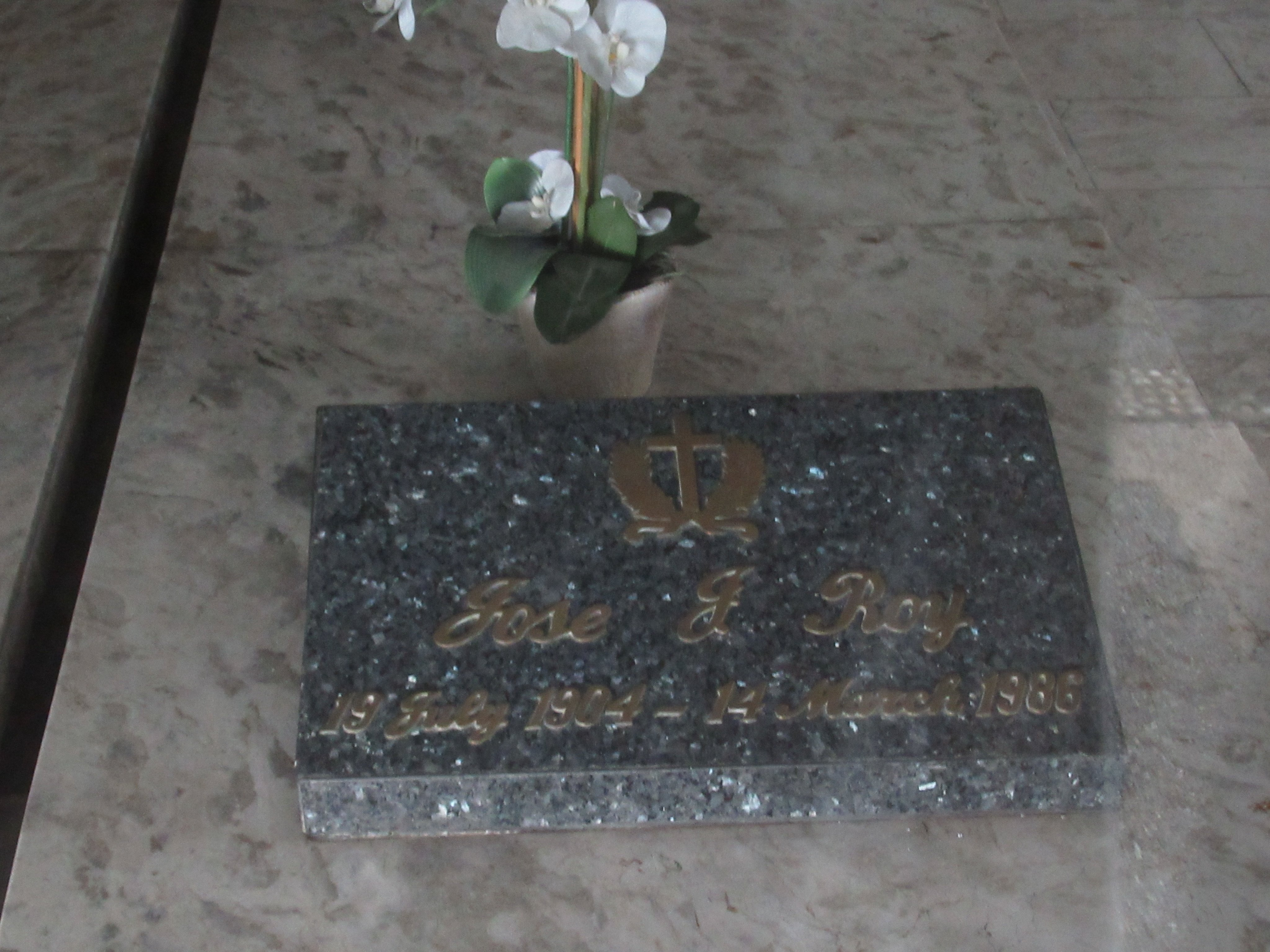
Grave marker
