= Henry Cojuangco =

Filipino politician and sports executive (1941–2015)

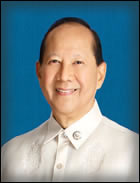
- Official portrait, 2013

Member of the Philippine House of Representatives from Tarlac's 1st District
- In office June 30, 2010 – May 12, 2015
- Preceded by: Nikki Teodoro
- Succeeded by: Vacant (Note: Henry Cojuangco died while in the middle of the term, and there is no assigned temporary caretaker); Later by Carlos Cojuangco

Personal details
- Born: Enrique Murphy Cojuangco; February 1, 1941 Philippines
- Died: May 12, 2015 (aged 74) Pasig, Metro Manila, Philippines
- Party: NPC (2009–2015)
- Children: Enrique Cojuangco Jr.
- Relatives: Cojuangco family
- Education: De La Salle University
- Occupation: Politician, businessman
- Basketball career

Career highlights
- As executive: 4× PBA champion (2004 Fiesta, 2004–05 Fiesta); Danny Floro PBA Executive of the Year Award (2004–05)

Enrique "Henry" Murphy Cojuangco (February 1, 1941 – May 12, 2015) was a Filipino politician and basketball executive. He is the brother of Danding Cojuangco.

Henry Cojuangco served as former governor of the Barangay Ginebra, and congressman of Tarlac's 1st district.

Cojuangco died of aneurysm.
