= Sergio Aquino (politician) =

Filipino politician

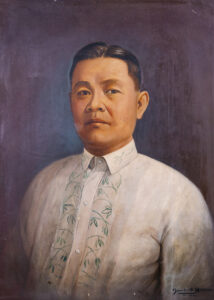

Member of the National Assembly of the Philippines for Tarlac's at-large district
- In office September 25, 1943 – February 2, 1944 Serving with Benigno Aquino Sr.
- Period: Second Republic
- Preceded by: District re-created
- Succeeded by: District abolished (seat later held by Homobono Sawit and Mercedes Cojuangco-Teodoro in 1984)

Governor of Tarlac
- In office 1943–1944
- Preceded by: Eduardo Cojuangco Sr.
- Succeeded by: Feliciano Gardiner

Municipal President of Concepcion, Tarlac
- In office 1937–1941

Personal details
- Born: Sergio Aquino y Lampa; September 7, 1897
- Died: after 1944
- Party: Nacionalista (1937–1942); KALIBAPI (1942–1944)
- Relatives: Aquino family

Sergio Lampa Aquino (September 7, 1897 – after 1944) was a Filipino politician who served as a member of the National Assembly during the Second Philippine Republic representing Tarlac's at-large assembly district from 1943 to 1944. He also served as municipal president of Concepcion, Tarlac from 1937 to 1941 and as governor of Tarlac from 1943 to 1944.

Aquino earned a Bachelor of Civil Law degree from the University of Santo Tomas in 1919. He was the brother of Aurora Aquino, who married senator and Assembly speaker Benigno Aquino Sr.

House of Representatives of the Philippines
New district	Member of the National Assembly of the Philippines for Tarlac's at-large district 1943–1944; With: Benigno Aquino Sr.	Vacant Dissolution of the Second Republic Title next held by Homobono Sawit and Mercedes Cojuangco-Teodoro (in the Batasang Pambansa)
Political offices
Previous: Eduardo Cojuangco Sr.	Governor of Tarlac; 1943–1944	Succeeded by Feliciano Gardiner
