= Moncada, Tarlac =

Municipality in Tarlac, Philippines

Moncada
- Municipality
- Municipality of Moncada
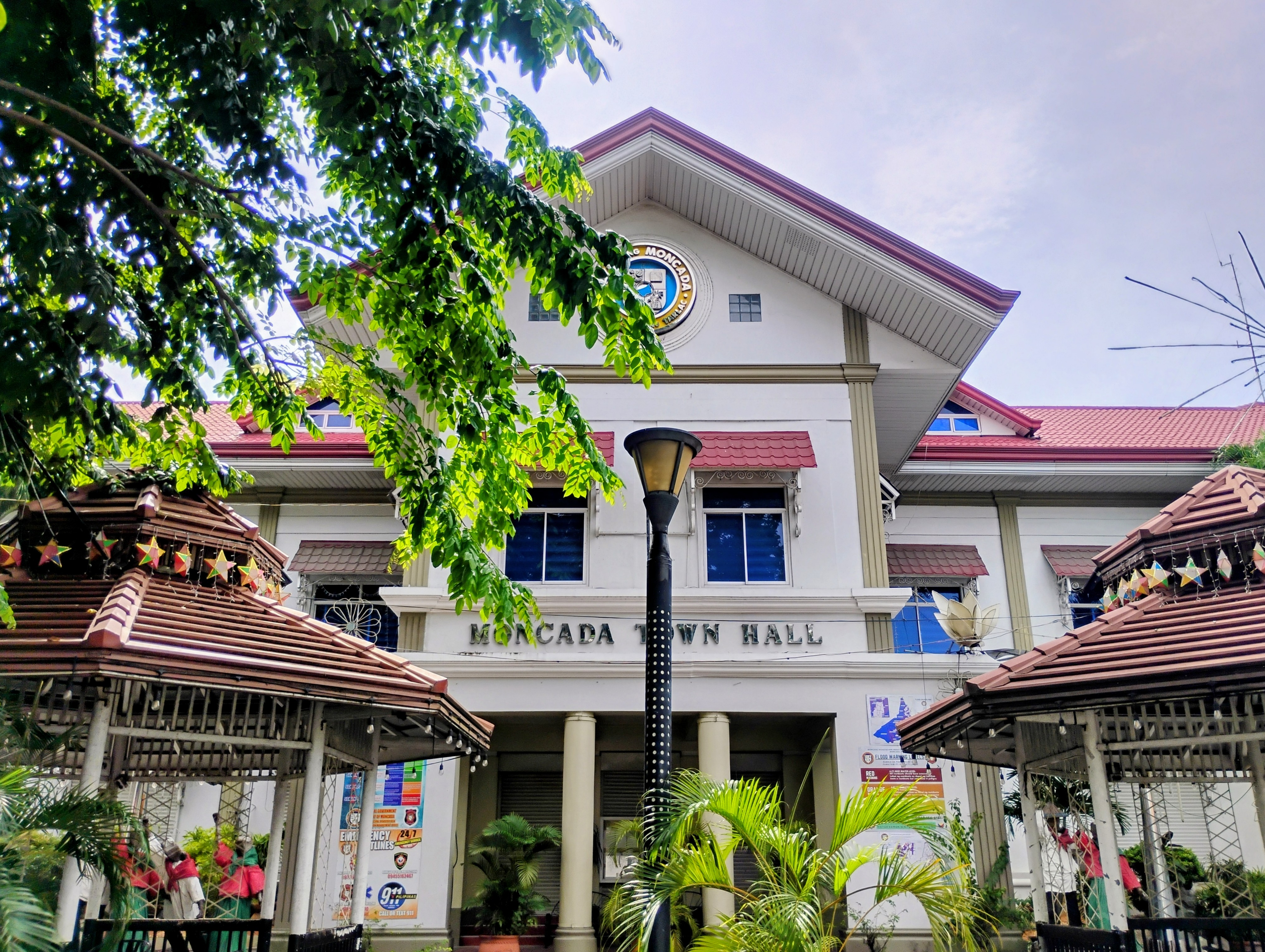
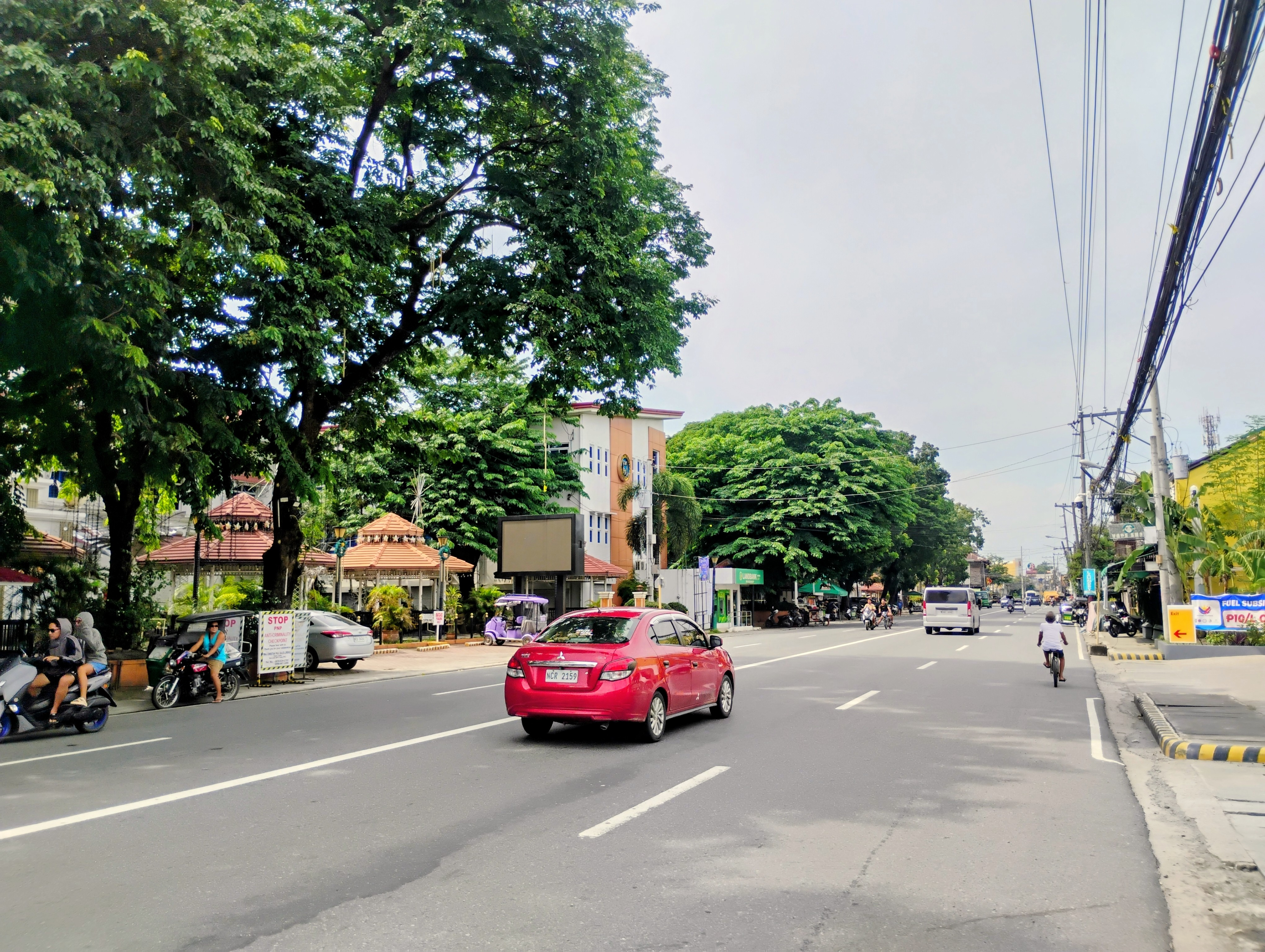
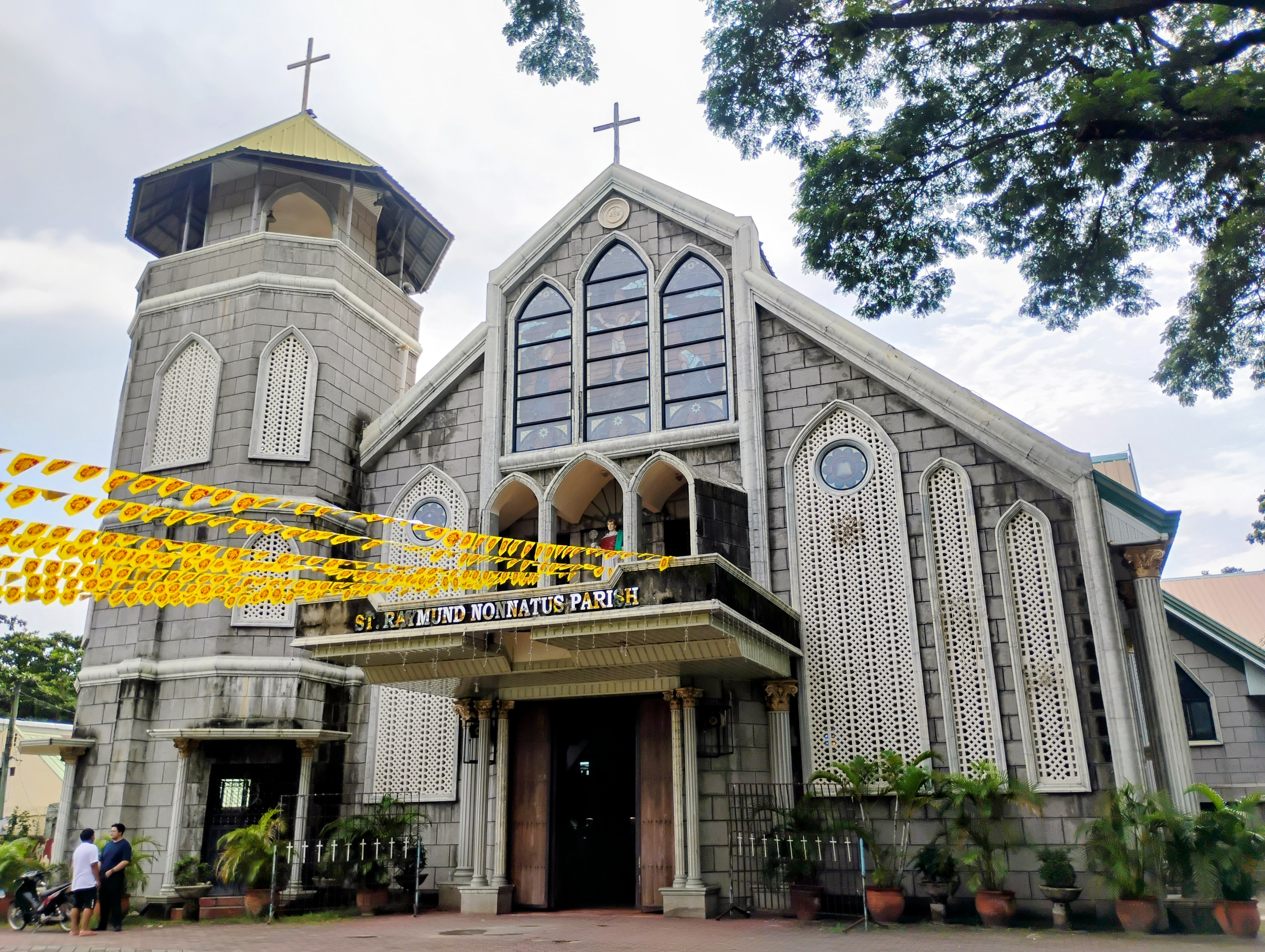
- Moncada Town Hall Moncada Town Proper Saint Raymond Nonnatus Parish Church

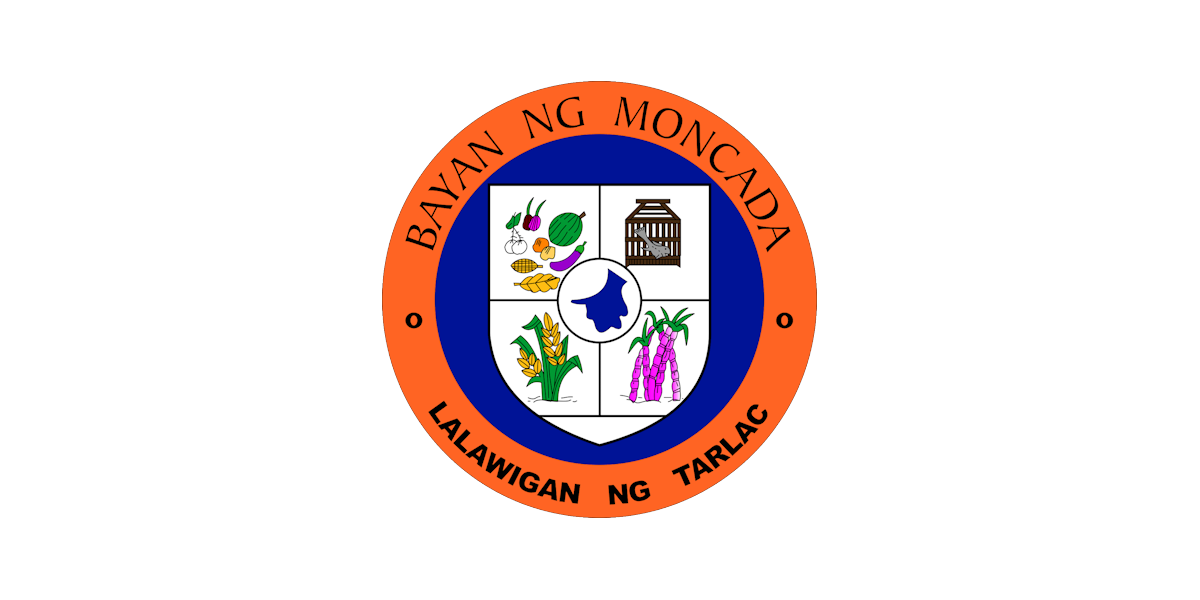
- Flag Seal

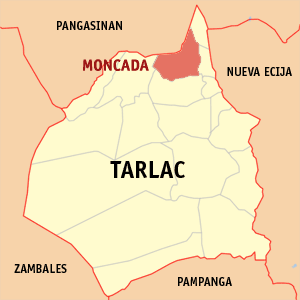
- Map of Tarlac with Moncada highlighted
- Interactive map of Moncada
- Location within the Philippines
- Coordinates: 15°43′59″N 120°34′21″E
- Country: Philippines
- Region: Central Luzon
- Province: Tarlac
- District: 1st district
- Founded: July 1, 1875
- Barangays: 37 (see Barangays)

Government
  - Type: Sangguniang Bayan
  - Mayor: Estelita M. Aquino
  - Vice Mayor: Jaime O. Duque
  - Representative: Carlos O. Cojuangco
  - Electorate: 39,659 voters (2025)

Area
  - Total: 85.75 km^{2} (33.11 sq mi)
- Elevation: 19 m (62 ft)
- Highest elevation: 34 m (112 ft)
- Lowest elevation: 12 m (39 ft)

Population (2024 census)
  - Total: 66,925
  - Density: 780.5/km^{2} (2,021/sq mi)
  - Households: 15,606

Economy
  - Income class: 1st municipal income class
  - Poverty incidence: 10.72% (2023)
  - Revenue: ₱ 270 million (2024)
  - Assets: ₱ 766.9 million (2024)
  - Expenditure: ₱ 249.8 million (2024)
  - Liabilities: ₱ 208.5 million (2024)

Service provider
  - Electricity: Tarlac 1 Electric Cooperative (TARELCO 1)
- Time zone: UTC+8 (PST)
- ZIP code: 2308
- PSGC: 0306909000
- IDD : area code: +63 (0)45
- Native languages: Pangasinan; Ilocano; Tagalog; Kapampangan
- Website: moncadatarlac.gov.ph

Moncada, officially the Municipality of Moncada (Pangasinan: Baley na Moncada; Ilocano: Ili ti Moncada; Tagalog: Bayan ng Moncada), is a 1st class municipality in the province of Tarlac, Philippines. According to the 2024 census, it has a population of 66,925 people.

The economy is primarily based on agriculture, with rice, corn, vegetables, root crops, watermelons, and mangoes as major products. The fishery sector, once a vibrant source of food and income, needs rehabilitation after the onslaught of lahar flows resulting from the Mount Pinatubo eruption. There is a growing retail and service sector in the poblacion along the national highway. Light industries have yet to evolve in the municipality to generate much needed employment.

== History ==
Originally, Moncada was a part of the town of Paniqui. Oral history indicates that the area was originally named after the principal crop grown in the place, a certain type of tobacco known as "muscada". Oral history indicates also that the newly inhabited lands in early 18th century - until then uncultivated and uninhabited due to its harsh geological situation and location - by some pioneer families (the first settlers seem to be unknown by official documents) that fled Spanish persecutions in nearby towns, was called San Ramon in honor of the saint whom they venerated. From the administrative organization of its mother town Paniqui in mid-18th century, barrio San Ramon, which was fast developing in economy and population, became a municipality and was named "Moncada" in honor of the powerful Moncada family, from Valencia, Spain. San Manuel, the neighboring municipality, was a former barrio of Moncada.

The pioneer families of Moncada increased in number as time went on and probably mostly from the towns of the now so-called First District of Tarlac and from the nearby towns of Pangasinan, where principally Ilocano was spoken. The history of Moncada is instilled in the minds of its people, through its progresses and achievements with time. Starting as a land of "El Dorado" (similar to the meaning of the term "gold rush"), a "golden land without gold" for landless and oppressed people by an oppressive colonial country, from a poor barrio that it was, now it became a first class town of the Philippines. Moncada must also look back on its written history, and especially, from what the many pioneer families had in reality contributed in the past for its development.

The American Occupation of the Philippines, right after the swift Spanish-American War (21 April 1898 – 10 December 1898), produced local revolutionaries who fought for Philippine self-determination and the Country free from foreign domination. The Katipunan revolutionary secret society, which was founded by Andres Bonifacio in July 7, 1892 as anti-Spanish colonialism in the Philippines, continued as a revolutionary secret society against the American Occupation after the Treaty of Paris (1898). The revolutionaries referred here are Placido Cuchapin and Nicolas Valenton who can be considered, from official document, the most important Moncada heroes of the Philippine-American War.

When the Philippines was placed under the authority of the United States, Cuchapin and Valenton were installed respectively as presidente and vice presidente and lieutenant of the police of Moncada. During this period of Philippine war against the United States, Placido Cuchapin and Nicolas Valenton were accused and sentenced by the Military Commission on 13 June 1901 for "Treachery in office and violation of the laws of war."

To summarize this part of the history of Moncada, it is enough to note here the Military Commission's charges and sentences on Placido Cuchapin and Nicolas Valenton. On Cuchapin the Military Commission stated: "And the commission does therefore sentence him, Placido Cuchapin, native, "To be confined at hard labor, under guard, at such place as the reviewing authority may direct, for the period of thirty (30) years."

The motivations of the sentence were the following: "In the foregoing case it appears that the accused, Placido Cuchapin, while presidente of the pueblo of Moncada, Tarlac, and under oath of allegiance to the United States Government, received in the presidencia, an insurgent captain, who conveyed orders from higher insurgent authority to accused, directing him to organize an attack upon the American garrison there stationed; to destroy the railroad tracks and the telegraph lines used by the United States authorities and to fire a house as the signal of attack upon the American troops as they came from their quarters. It appears that while he was the recognized presidente under American authority, the accused was also chief of the Katipunan society of his pueblo.

This explains the thoroughness of his secret preparations for carrying out the orders he had received and for threatening his subordinates with penalty of death to themselves and their families if they failed to assist him therein. While his betrayal of official trust was most treacherous, still in view of the fact that no acts of wanton cruelty are traced to his hands, the sentence approved by the department commander while confirmed, is mitigated to confinement at hard labor for fifteen (15) years, as thus mitigated the sentence will be duly executed. The Presidio de Manila is designated as the place of confinement, to which place the prisoner will be sent under proper guard."

The charges against Nicolas Valenton were based on the same historical events wherein Cuchapin was involved, though formulated in accordance with the position Valenton held at the time in Moncada. Valenton was sentenced, at first, for imprisonment for the period of twenty (20) years, and on final sentence was reduced to ten (10) years of confinement at the Presidio de Manila.

The charges against Cuchapin and Valenton were based on war acts in Moncada committed in time of war as the Military Commission recognized, in October 1900, against the United States Occupation. In their cases, two other revolutionaries were named and identified by the Military Commission, without specifying their provenance: Maximino Paraso, identified as an insurgent captain, and Fructuoso Sembrano, a guerilla chief.

From the World War II Moncada had also war heroes. One of them is known as Captain Ablang, who was a member of the Philippine Scouts and was killed in action. Another Moncada hero of this period is Macario Peralta, who joined the Philippine Army in 1936 and attended the Philippine Army Infantry School in 1940. Colonel Peralta became famous and received awards for his war exploits in Panay against the Japanese Army. In 1945, Peralta was promoted to Brigadier General and designated Deputy Chief of Staff of the Philippine Army and then served as Defense Secretary (See: Wikipedia). Honorable Peralta was elected Senator in 1949. After his retirement from politics he practiced law.

Right after the war, in 1946, elections were held in the Philippines. Moncada had its first congressman ever elected for the First District of the Province of Tarlac. Honorable Jose Roy held this position for four consecutive terms, a real success for an agricultural tenant son, a brilliant lawyer and banker, who worked through his law degree from the University of the Philippines. Roy was elected as Senator in 1961 and reelected in 1967. Another prominent person of the period is Honorable Antonio E. Lopez, popularly known as "Kamote", who defeated an Aquino-Cojuangco candidate for the post of Tarlac governor in the 1949 elections. In the '60s, another politician and three-terms past mayor of Moncada (1946-1948/1952-1955/1960-1963), Honorable Melanio Cuchapin was elected Board Member of the First District of the Province of Tarlac. The "golden age" of Moncada started during this post-war period which went on until the 1970s.

Moncada had its "golden age" during this period, not only because of these prominent political personalities in provincial and national scenes, but also due to the industriousness of the people and the real peace reigning in the town. Crime and corruption were almost unknown, politics was not at all dirty.

In more recent years, another son of Moncada became prominent in the national scene. Referred to here is General Voltaire Tuvera Gazmin. He was the 35th Secretary of the Department of National Defense of the Philippines from 2010 to 2016, under President Benigno S. Aquino III. Before this, General Gazmin was the Commander of the Philippine Presidential Security Group from 1986 to 1992. He was the Commanding General of the Philippine Army from 1999 until 2000 and as Philippine Ambassador to Cambodia from 2002 until 2004.

== Geography ==
Moncada is a municipality in the northern part of Tarlac province, Philippines. It is located approximately 153 kilometres (95 mi) north of Manila and 29 kilometres (18 mi) north of Tarlac City, the provincial capital. The municipality borders San Manuel to the north, Camiling to the west, Paniqui to the south, and Anao to the east. Moncada is accessible via the MacArthur Highway and is connected to Manila through the North Luzon Expressway (NLEX), Subic–Clark–Tarlac Expressway (SCTEX), and Tarlac–Pangasinan–La Union Expressway (TPLEX).

=== Barangays ===
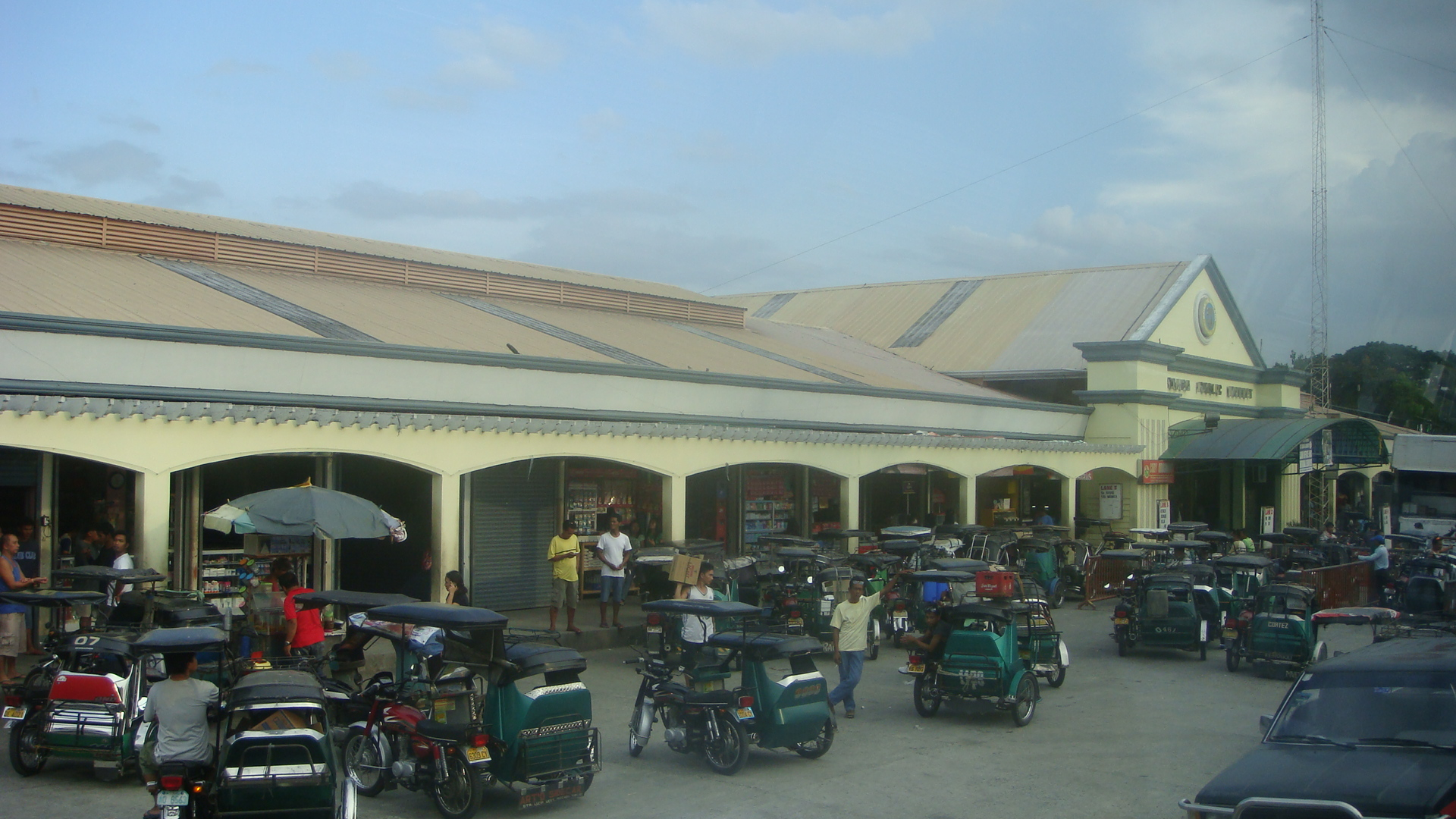
Public market

Moncada is politically subdivided into 37 barangays, as shown below. Each barangay consists of puroks and some have sitios.

- Ablang-Sapang
- Aringin
- Atencio
- Banaoang East
- Banaoang West
- Baquero Norte
- Baquero Sur
- Burgos
- Calamay
- Calapan
- Camangaan East
- Camangaan West
- Camposanto 1 - Norte
- Camposanto 1 - Sur
- Camposanto 2
- Capaoayan
- Lapsing
- Mabini
- Maluac
- Poblacion 1
- Poblacion 2
- Poblacion 3
- Poblacion 4
- Rizal
- San Juan
- San Julian
- San Leon
- San Pedro
- San Roque
- Santa Lucia East
- Santa Lucia West
- Santa Maria
- Santa Monica
- Tolega Norte
- Tolega Sur
- Tubectubang
- Villa

=== Climate ===
Climate data for Moncada, Tarlac
Month	Jan	Feb	Mar	Apr	May	Jun	Jul	Aug	Sep	Oct	Nov	Dec	Year
Mean daily maximum °C (°F)	30 (86)	31 (88)	33 (91)	35 (95)	33 (91)	31 (88)	30 (86)	29 (84)	29 (84)	30 (86)	31 (88)	30 (86)	31 (88)
Mean daily minimum °C (°F)	19 (66)	19 (66)	20 (68)	22 (72)	24 (75)	24 (75)	24 (75)	24 (75)	23 (73)	22 (72)	21 (70)	20 (68)	22 (71)
Average precipitation mm (inches)	3 (0.1)	2 (0.1)	5 (0.2)	10 (0.4)	80 (3.1)	107 (4.2)	138 (5.4)	147 (5.8)	119 (4.7)	70 (2.8)	26 (1.0)	8 (0.3)	715 (28.1)
Average rainy days	2.0	1.7	2.7	4.6	16.1	20.8	24.0	23.0	21.4	15.5	8.0	3.2	143
Source: Meteoblue

== Demographics ==
Population census of Moncada
Year	Pop.	±% p.a.
1903	13,003	—
1918	10,673	−1.31%
1939	12,518	+0.76%
1948	17,807	+3.99%
1960	23,496	+2.34%
1970	29,195	+2.19%
1975	31,825	+1.74%
1980	34,451	+1.60%
1990	41,672	+1.92%
1995	46,219	+1.96%
2000	49,607	+1.53%
2007	54,547	+1.32%
2010	56,183	+1.08%
2015	57,787	+0.54%
2020	62,819	+1.77%
2024	66,925	+1.53%
Source: Philippine Statistics Authority

In the 2024 census, the population of Moncada was 66,925 people, with a density of 780 inhabitants per square kilometre or 2,000 inhabitants per square mile.

=== Language ===
Ilocano, Kapampangan, and Pangasinan are commonly spoken, with Tagalog and English as official languages used for secondary education, business and governance.

== Economy ==
Poverty incidence of Moncada (%)

Source: Philippine Statistics Authority

== Education ==
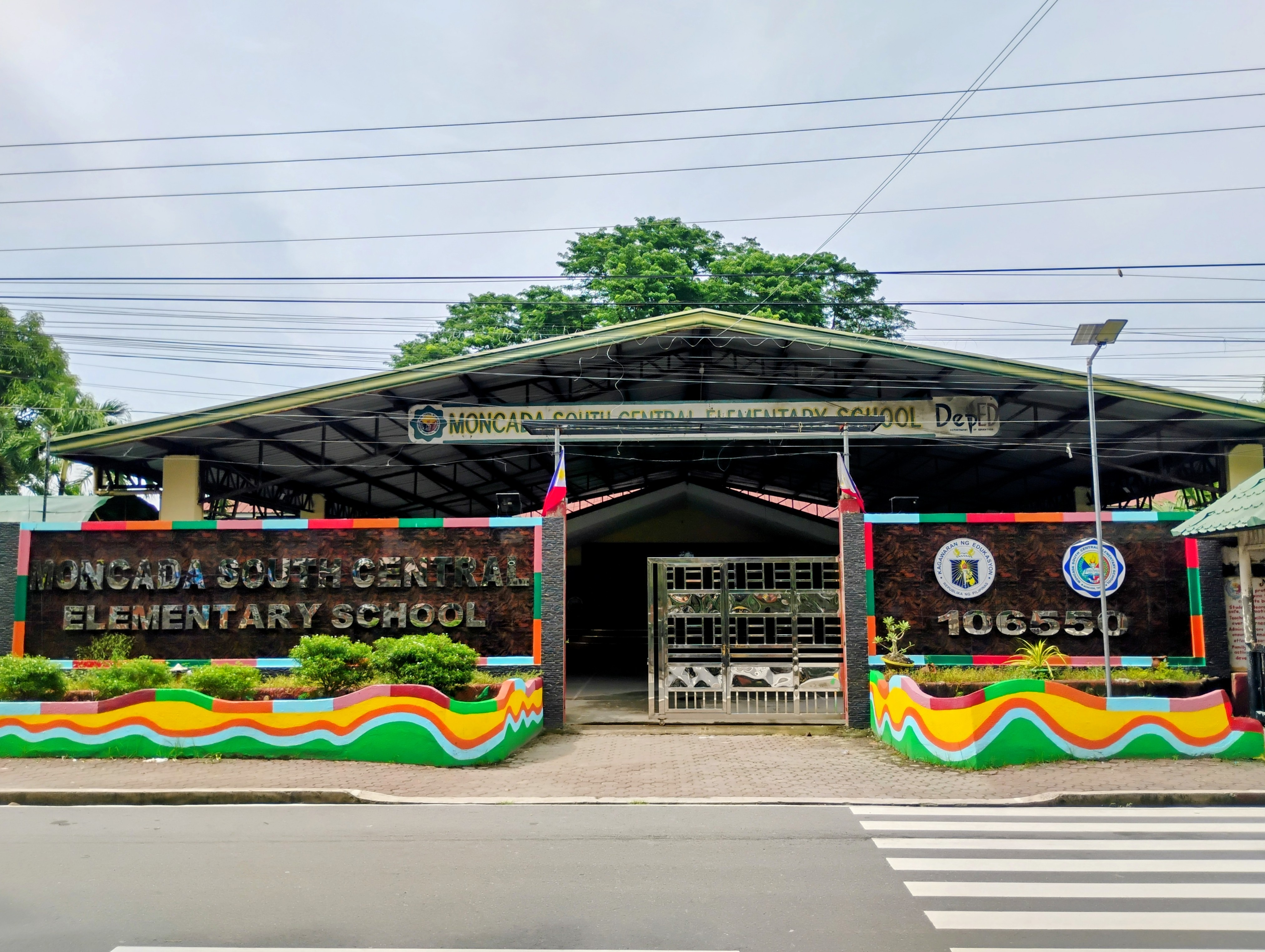
Moncada South Central Elementary School

There are two schools district offices which govern all educational institutions within the municipality. They oversee the management and operations of all private and public, from primary to secondary schools. These are Moncada North Schools District Office, and Moncada South Schools District Office.

=== Primary and elementary schools ===
- Aringin Elementary School
- Atencio Primary School
- Banaoang East Elementary School
- Banaoang West Elementary School
- Baquero Sur Elementary School
- Bible Fellowship Learning Center
- Burgos Elementary School
- Calamay Elementary School
- Calapan Elementary School
- Camangaan Primary School
- Camposanto Elementary School
- Capaoayan Elementary School
- Interword Asian Institute (Elementary)
- Lapsing Elementary School
- Lord's Love Academy
- Mabini Elementary School
- Majical Learning Montessori School
- Maluac Elementary School
- Moncada Adventist Multigrade School
- Moncada Catholic School
- Moncada North Central School
- Moncada South Central School
- Plebeian Academy
- Saint Raymund Learning Center
- San Juan Elementary School
- San Julian Elementary School
- San Leon Elementary School
- San Pedro Elementary School
- San Roque Elementary School
- Sapang Elementary School
- Sta. Lucia Elementary School
- Sta. Maria Elementary School
- Tagurarit Elementary School
- Tolega Sur Elementary School
- The United Methodist Church Learning Center
- Tolega Norte Elementary School
- Villa Elementary School

=== Secondary schools ===
- Aringin National High School
- Baquero Norte Integrated School
- Demetrio F. Nagtalon Integrated School
- Interword Asian Institute
- Moncada National High School
- San Julian-Sta. Maria National High School
- San Pedro National High School
- Sapang High School
- Sta. Monica Integrated School

== Notable personalities ==
- Horacio Morales, Secretary of Agrarian Reform
