= Ramos, Tarlac =

Municipality in Tarlac, Philippines

Ramos
- Municipality
- Municipality of Ramos
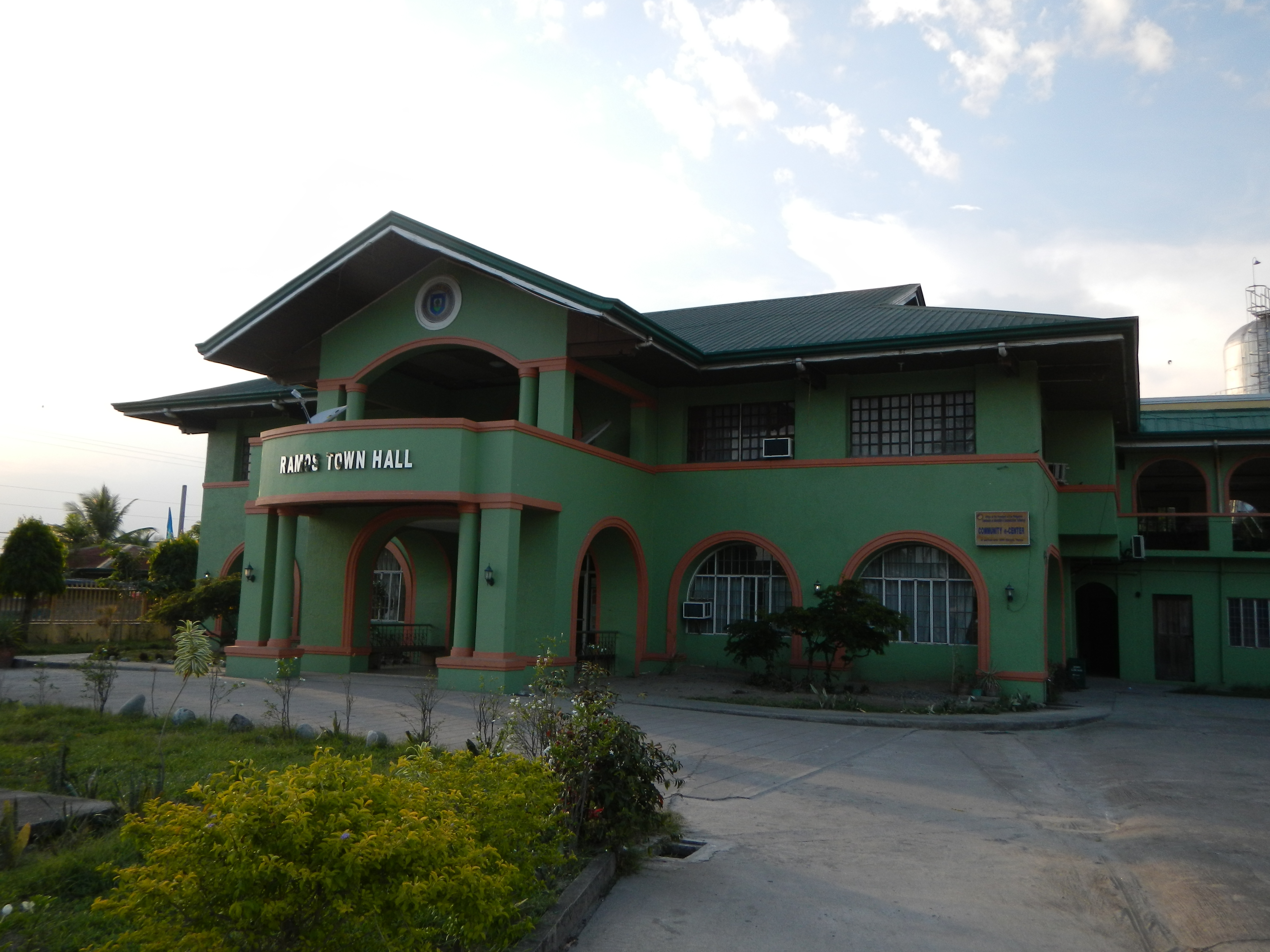
- Municipal Hall

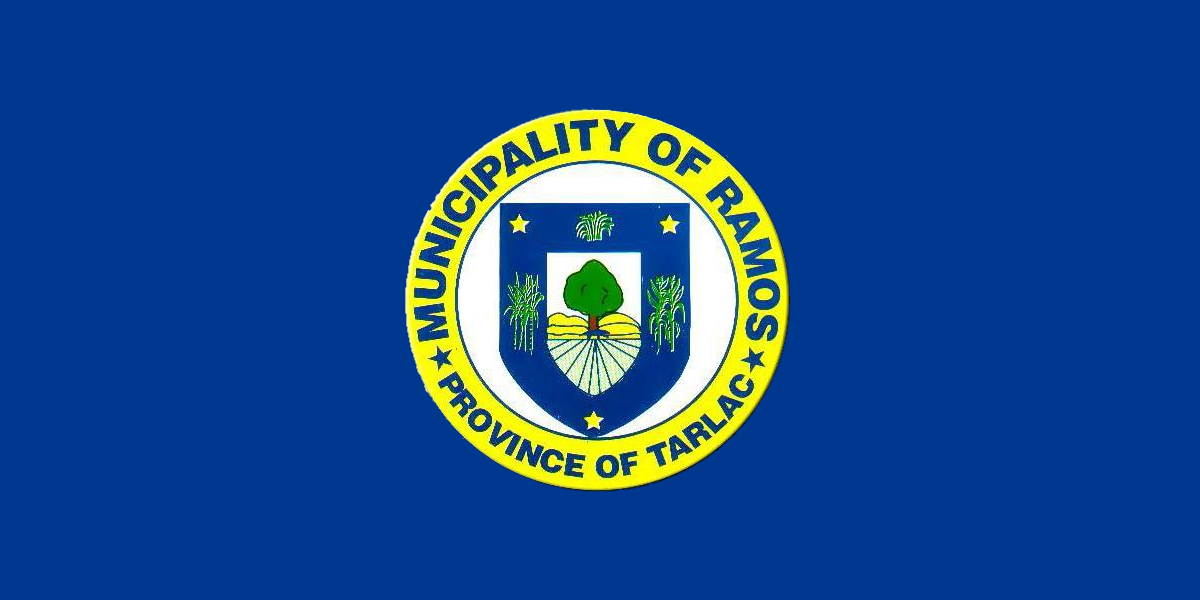
- Flag

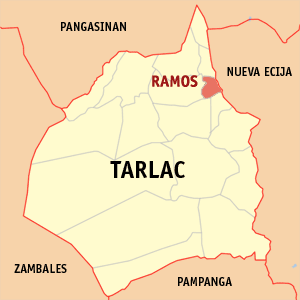
- Map of Tarlac with Ramos highlighted
- Interactive map of Ramos
- Location within the Philippines
- Coordinates: 15°40′00″N 120°38′30″E
- Country: Philippines
- Region: Central Luzon
- Province: Tarlac
- District: 1st district
- Founded: January 1, 1921
- Named for: Alfonso Ramos
- Barangays: 9 (see Barangays)

Government
  - Type: Sangguniang Bayan
  - Mayor: Celso L. Banag
  - Vice Mayor: Edgardo F. Suñiga Jr.
  - Representative: Jaime D. Cojuangco
  - Electorate: 16,035 voters (2025)

Area
  - Total: 24.40 km^{2} (9.42 sq mi)
- Elevation: 22 m (72 ft)
- Highest elevation: 33 m (108 ft)
- Lowest elevation: 16 m (52 ft)

Population (2024 census)
  - Total: 23,808
  - Density: 975.7/km^{2} (2,527/sq mi)
  - Households: 5,514

Economy
  - Income class: 4th municipal income class
  - Poverty incidence: 12.24% (2023)
  - Revenue: ₱ 125.7 million (2024)
  - Assets: ₱ 480.5 million (2024)
  - Expenditure: ₱ 122.4 million (2024)
  - Liabilities: ₱ 149.4 million (2024)

Service provider
  - Electricity: Tarlac 1 Electric Cooperative (TARELCO 1)
- Time zone: UTC+8 (PST)
- ZIP code: 2311
- PSGC: 0306912000
- IDD : area code: +63 (0)45
- Native languages: Pangasinan; Ilocano; Tagalog; Kapampangan

Ramos, officially the Municipality of Ramos (Ilocano: Ili ti Ramos; Pangasinan: Baley na Ramos; Tagalog: Bayan ng Ramos), is a municipality in the province of Tarlac, Philippines. According to the 2024 census, it has a population of 23,808 people.

== Etymology ==
Formerly named Bani. The town used to be a barrio of Paniqui from 1878 until December 31, 1920. But on January 1, 1921, Bani became a separate town and was later renamed to "Ramos" in recognition of its founder Don Geminiano Ramos and in memory of Gov. Alfonso Ramos, who initiated the creation of the town.

== Geography ==
Ramos is 26 kilometres (16 mi) from Tarlac City and 150 kilometres (93 mi) from Manila.

=== Barangays ===
Ramos is politically subdivided into 9 barangays, as shown below. Each barangay consists of puroks and some have sitios.

- Coral-Iloco
- Guiteb
- Pance
- Poblacion Center
- Poblacion North
- Poblacion South
- San Juan
- San Raymundo
- Toledo

=== Climate ===
Climate data for Ramos, Tarlac
Month	Jan	Feb	Mar	Apr	May	Jun	Jul	Aug	Sep	Oct	Nov	Dec	Year
Mean daily maximum °C (°F)	30 (86)	31 (88)	33 (91)	35 (95)	33 (91)	31 (88)	30 (86)	29 (84)	29 (84)	30 (86)	31 (88)	30 (86)	31 (88)
Mean daily minimum °C (°F)	19 (66)	19 (66)	20 (68)	22 (72)	24 (75)	24 (75)	24 (75)	24 (75)	23 (73)	22 (72)	21 (70)	20 (68)	22 (71)
Average precipitation mm (inches)	3 (0.1)	2 (0.1)	5 (0.2)	10 (0.4)	80 (3.1)	107 (4.2)	138 (5.4)	147 (5.8)	119 (4.7)	70 (2.8)	26 (1.0)	8 (0.3)	715 (28.1)
Average rainy days	2.0	1.7	2.7	4.6	16.1	20.8	24.0	23.0	21.4	15.5	8.0	3.2	143
Source: Meteoblue

== Demographics ==
Population census of Ramos
Year	Pop.	±% p.a.
1939	4,035	—
1948	6,535	+5.50%
1960	7,531	+1.19%
1970	9,649	+2.51%
1975	10,626	+1.95%
1980	11,215	+1.08%
1990	13,566	+1.92%
1995	15,476	+2.50%
2000	16,889	+1.89%
2007	19,646	+2.11%
2010	20,249	+1.11%
2015	21,350	+1.01%
2020	22,879	+1.47%
2024	23,808	+0.96%
Source: Philippine Statistics Authority

In the 2024 census, the population of Ramos was 23,808 people, with a density of 980 inhabitants per square kilometre or 2,500 inhabitants per square mile.

=== Languages ===
Ilocano and Pangasinan are the main dialects of Ramos. Kapampangan and Tagalog are also used by the residents.

== Economy ==
Poverty incidence of Ramos (%)

Source: Philippine Statistics Authority

== Education ==
The Ramos Schools District Office governs all educational institutions within the municipality. It oversees the management and operations of all private and public, from primary to secondary schools.

=== Primary and elementary schools ===
- Coral Elementary School
- Guiteb Elementary School
- Pance Elementary School
- Ramos De Marta Central School
- Resurrexit Christi Learning Center
- Rutherford Faith Christian Academia
- San Juan Elementary School
- San Raymundo Elementary School
- Serrano Primary School
- Toledo Elementary School

=== Secondary school ===
- Ramos National High School
