= José Cojuangco =

Filipino politician (1896–1976)

José C. Cojuangco
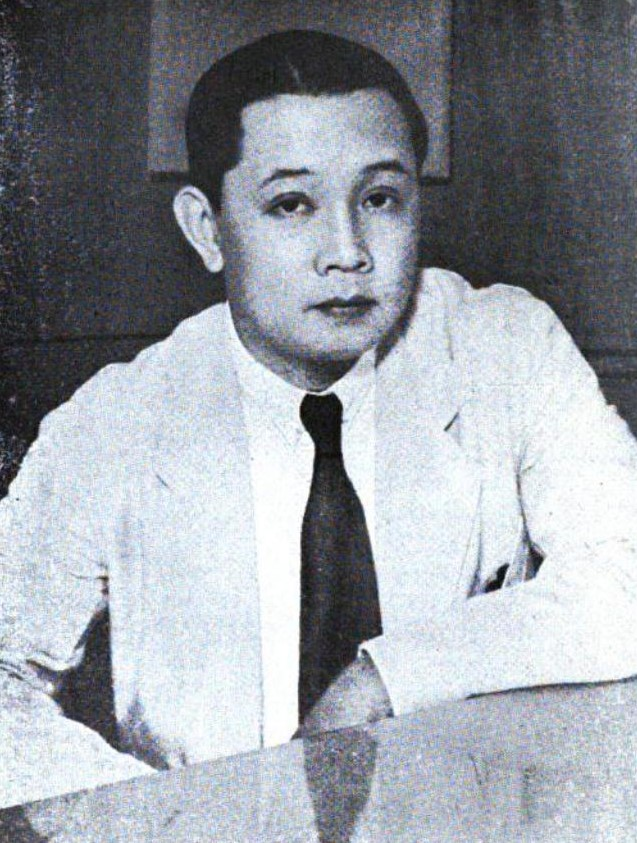
- Photograph from The Commercial & Industrial Manual of the Philippines, 1941

Member of the Philippine House of Representatives from Tarlac's 1st district (Note: Cojuangco served as a member of the National Assembly from September 16, 1935 to December 30, 1941.)
- In office June 5, 1945 – May 25, 1946
- Preceded by: District recreated
- Succeeded by: Jose Roy
- In office 1934 – December 30, 1941
- Preceded by: Alfonso Pablo
- Succeeded by: District dissolved

Personal details
- Born: José Cojuangco y Chichioco; July 3, 1896 Malolos, Bulacan, Captaincy General of the Philippines
- Died: August 21, 1976 (aged 80) Manila, Philippines
- Resting place: Manila Memorial Park – Sucat, Paranaque, Philippines
- Party: Nacionalista
- Spouse: Demetria Sumulong
- Children: 8, including Josephine, Maria Corazon, and José Jr. "Peping"
- Relatives: Kris Aquino (granddaughter); Mikee Cojuangco-Jaworski (granddaughter); Benigno Aquino III (grandson); Benigno Aquino Jr. (son-in-law); Tingting Cojuangco (daughter-in-law)

José "Pepe" Chichioco Cojuangco Sr. KSS (July 3, 1896 – August 21, 1976) was a Filipino politician and banker who served as Representative of the 1st District of Tarlac in the Philippines from 1934 to 1946. Cojuangco is one of the patriarchs of the Cojuangco clan.

In 1938, Cojuangco co-founded the Philippine Bank of Commerce (PBC; later the Equitable PCI Bank), the first bank to be majority-owned by Filipinos. In 1963, he founded the First United Bank (later acquired by the Philippine Coconut Authority and renamed UCPB).

He was the father and grandfather of future Philippine presidents Corazon Aquino and Benigno Aquino III, respectively. His other grandchildren include actresses Kris Aquino and Mikee Cojuangco.

== Personal life ==
=== Parents ===
His grandfather Khó͘ Gio̍k-khoân (Chinese: 許玉寰) was the first José Cojuangco ("El Chino" José), the progenitor of the Cojuangco clan, from Hongjian, in Jiaomei Township, Zhangzhou in Fujian province.

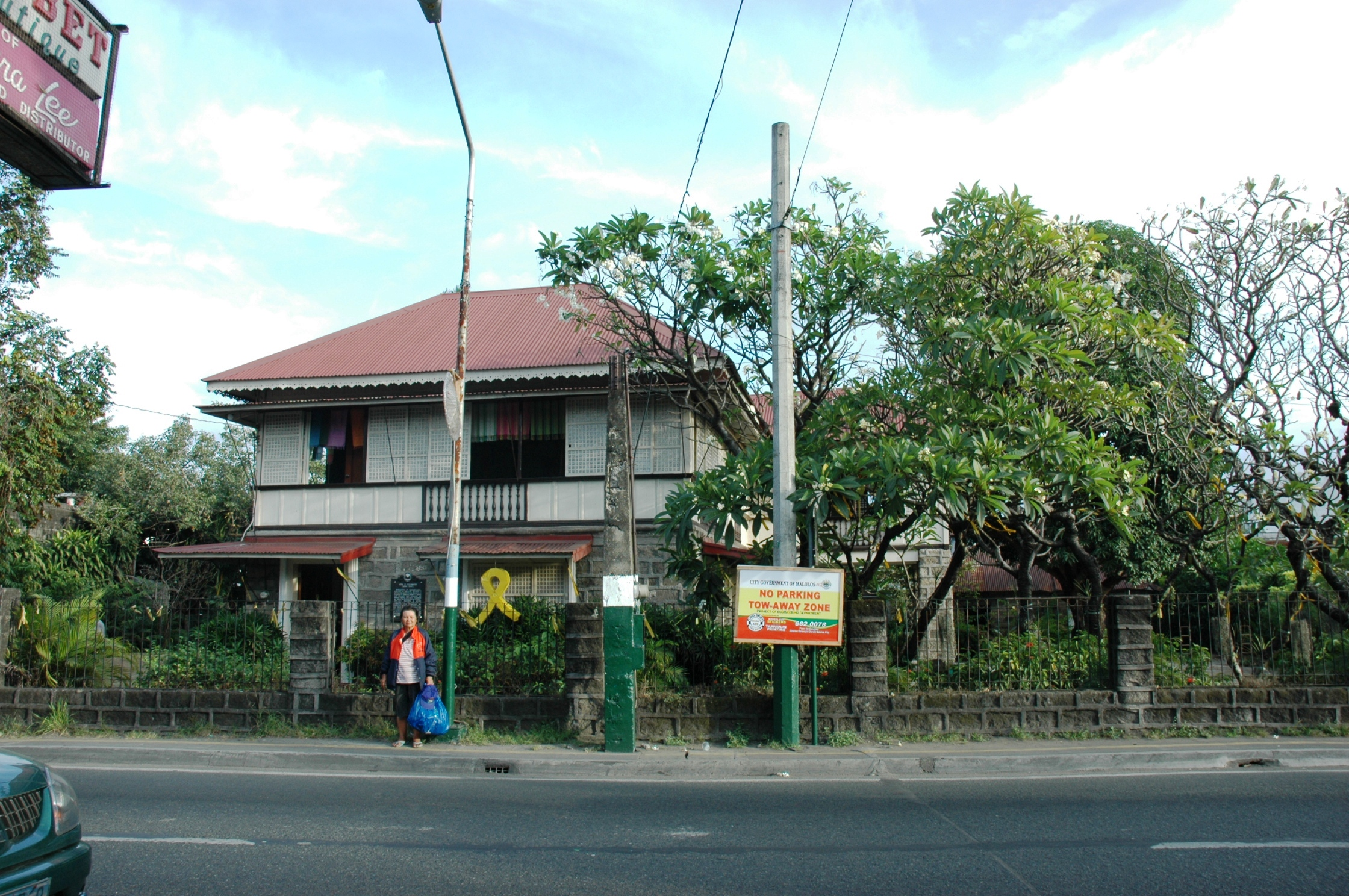
A Malolos native waiting for a jeep to ride in front of the Jose Cojuangco Mansion, at Paseo Del Congreso near Barasoain Church, the old and original house of José Chichioco Cojuangco

His father was Melecio Cojuangco y Estrella, who was a skilled carpenter. Melecio helped build churches in Binondo, Bulacan and in Gapan, Nueva Ecija. Melecio's mother was Antera Estrella, a Tagalog from Malolos, a daughter of Felipe Estrella and Martina Calub Cruz. With the Estrella connection, the Cojuangcos gained their initial foothold in Nueva Ecija.

Melecio's wife was a Chinese mestiza, Tecla Chichioco y Jumaquio of Malolos and Hagonoy, Bulacan. She was a scion from the Spanish Valenzuela clan of Malolos, the Chinese Chichioco clan of Malolos, and the Japanese descendant hacienderos (plantation owners) Jumaquio clan of Kapitangan, Paombong, Bulacan. Tecla was the great-grandniece of Don Tiburcio Jumaquio and Doña Urzula Gutierrez, hacienderos and merchants of Kapitangan, Paombong, Bulacan. One of her blood relatives was Don Catalino Gutierrez Jumaquio, of Calizon, Paombong, Bulacan, in the late 1800s and one of the sons of Don Tiburcio and Doña Urzula. Melecio's siblings include elder sister Ysidra, who massively enlarged the already considerable Cojuangco fortune by buying land and dabbling in sugar mills and real estate; and younger sister, Trinidad, who died a spinster.

=== Siblings ===
Cojuangco was the oldest of four siblings:

- Juan "Itoy" Chichioco Cojuangco (1st marriage to Elena Garcia / 2nd marriage to Lualhati Aldaba). His first wife, Doña Elena García Cojuangco, was a daughter of Spanish mestizo Gregorio García, who owned a rival sugar mill in Paniqui, Tarlac. His second wife, Lualhati "Hatì" Aldaba was a sister of Opera Guild of the Philippines founder Dalisay Aldaba and also the sister of the Philippine Government's first Social Secretary, Estefania Aldaba Lim. Juan Cojuangco died without legitimate heirs, although he sired a daughter through his sister-in-law, Imelda García.
- Antonio Chichioco Cojuangco Sr., who married Victoria Uychuico, a Chinese mestiza from Tarlac. Antonio was a doctor in Manila. He was massacred at De La Salle College by the Japanese in the final days of the Second World War, together with his wife, adopted son Ricardo ("Carding"), daughter Trinidad, household staff and neighbors. His daughter Trinidad was married to Servillano "Billy" Aquino II (a half brother of Benigno Aquino Jr.). His son, Ramón ("Monching"), was the owner of the PLDT and the father of Antonio Jr. ("Tony Boy"), former chairman of TV5.
- Eduardo "Endeng" Chichioco Cojuangco Sr. was José's youngest brother. He married Josephine Murphy, a Miss Baguio beauty queen and only daughter of Alhambra Theater owner John J. Murphy. Murphy, who later made Baguio his home, was a former United States Army soldier and paymaster to Colonel Lyman Kennon (for whom Kennon Road was named). Murphy and his battalion initially pursued Emilio Aguinaldo up to the Sierra Madre. Endeng is the father of Eduardo Cojuangco Jr.

Among the four male heirs of the Cojuangcos, Don Pepe (as José was remembered) was the only one born in Malolos, Bulacan, where his father Melecio built the secret stairway in Barasoain Church used by the Spanish friars to smuggle women into their private quarters. The old Cojuangco-Chichioco mansion still stands a few meters from the Barasoain Church on land inherited by Tecla from her father. It is maintained for the Cojuangcos by their Chichioco-Jumaquio relatives. The physical address used to be 540 Paseo del Congreso but the locals called it Calle de las Mestizas (Street of the Mestizas) on account of the numerous women who lived there, offspring of the friars nearby. After World War II, the name was changed to Santo Niño Street, Mestizohin District.

=== Wife and children ===
Cojuangco was married to Demetria "Metring" Sumulong, daughter of Senator Juan Marquez Sumulong of Rizal province and sister to Lorenzo Sumulong, also a Philippine senator. Their law offices were located within Manila's Plaza Cervantes where Metring used to serve as legal assistant. Demetria was also related to Senator Ceferino de Leon of San Miguel de Mayumo, Bulacan (Senator De Leon's daughter was Philippine Carnival Queen Trinidad Roura de Leon, wife of President Manuel Roxas, whose grandson Mar Roxas would be Demetria's grandson Noynoy Aquino's vice president running mate.) Family lore has it that Don Pepe's grandfather, "El Chino" José, insisted his eldest grandson to marry Metring since she had a mole under her nose, which would bring Pepe wealth beyond compare during his lifetime. The most obedient of the four boys, Don Pepe did not object to the marriage.

The couple had eight children:

- Ceferino (died August 26, 1925)
- Pedro or "Pete" (October 19, 1926 - July 20, 2011), married to Rosario "Sari" Cacho. Their younger son, Fernando "Nando" Cojuangco, is the administrator of Hacienda Luisita. Rosario Cacho is the youngest sister of Milagros (wife of Manuel Araneta) who is the mother of Louise "Liza" Cacho Araneta, wife of Bongbong Marcos.
- Josephine (November 26, 1927 - July 26, 2011), married to Nicanor Reyes, Jr., whose family founded Far Eastern University and the FEU-Nicanor Reyes Medical Foundation. She was named after Josephine Murphy Cojuangco, wife of her uncle Eduardo "Endeng" Cojuangco Sr. (father of Danding). She was president of FEU from 1985 to 1989 and held graduate degrees in education.
- Teresita or "Terry" (March 26, 1929 - January 16, 2005), married to Ricardo "Baby" Lopa (whose brother Manuel Lopa, Jr. married Maria Teresa Araneta, sister of Manuel Araneta and paternal aunt of Liza Cacho Araneta - Marcos), was born in 1929. The Lopa clan, through their patriarch Manuel Lopa, Sr. and matriarch Purificacion Tagle-Abad, (grandniece of the famed José Tagle - hero of the Battle of Imus and immortalized in a beautiful Fernando Amorsolo painting), were close business associates of the Cojuangcos who have mutual investments in Mantrade, First Manila Management, Pantranco, First United Bank, Central Azucarera de Tarlac, and Nissan Philippines. The Lopas made their fortune in the automotive and transportation industries, and were co-founders of Equitable Bank (now BDO Unibank). Lopa and his siblings were known for their extensive collection of Manansala, Amorsolo and other Filipino masterpiece paintings amassed during the 1960s when his father, Don Manuel, and father-in-law, Don Pepe, were at the height of their wealth.
- Carmen (June 20, 1931 - September 25, 1932)
- Maria Corazon or "Cory" (January 25, 1933 - August 1, 2009), In 1954, she married Senator Benigno S. Aquino Jr. Benigno, or "Ninoy", with President Ramon Magsaysay as one of the sponsors. Ninoy's grandfather, Servillano Aquino, was a general in the revolutionary army against Spain while his father, Benigno Aquino, Sr. was the Speaker of the National Assembly during the Japanese occupation of the Philippines. Honest politicians, General Servillano and his son were known to refuse any government salary or stipend. To finance their political activities, the elder Aquinos hocked their three largest haciendas away: Hacienda Lawang, Hacienda Murcia and Hacienda Tinang. By the time of Ninoy's marriage to Cory, much of the Aquino lands have dwindled. To finance his own political ambitions and election kitty, Ninoy was assisted by his dutiful wife who sold some of her assigned inheritance such as a one hectare sized lot in Wack-Wack subdivision near Wack Wack Golf and Country Club. The couple opted to build their very simple home in a very middle class area that is Times Street. Ninoy was previously the youngest governor of Tarlac and a Philippine senator, the staunchest critic of President Ferdinand Marcos and a protégé of President Ramon Magsaysay. Ninoy was assassinated at the tarmac of Manila International Airport on August 21, 1983. She became the 11th president of the Philippines.
- José Jr. or "Peping" (born September 19, 1934), married to Margarita "Tingting" Manzano de los Reyes. Peping was president of the Philippine Olympic Committee and previously a representative of the first legislative district of Tarlac. Margarita was governor of Tarlac (1992–1998). Through her de los Reyes side of the family, she is related to Gilbert Teodoro (Teodoro's great-grandfather was a de los Reyes love child), Manila Carnival Queen and billionaire attorney Pacita de los Reyes y Ongsiako (later married to an American serviceman) and Imelda de la Paz Ongsiako (who married Ramon Cojuangco). One of Peping's daughters married into the Benetton family of Italy that owns the iconic United Colors of Benetton brand, as well as vineyards and lands estancias in Argentina.
- Maria Paz or "Passy" (May 3, 1938 - June 2, 2015), married to Ernesto "Esting" Teopaco. The Teopacos were the neighbors of the Cojuangcos on Roberts Street in Pasay. Other families residing on said road were the Elizaldes, Sorianos, Quezons, Lopas, Cu-Unjiengs and the Oppens (the parents of Gretchen Oppen, the wife of Danding Cojuangco). The Teopaco-Cojuangcos were once known for their winning collection of gamecocks in the 1960s and 1970s.

== World War II ==
In the 1940s, with less than a day's notice, he left the Cojuangco mansion (built in 1933) along Agno Street (near De La Salle College) in Malate, Manila for the safety of Antipolo, Rizal (political bailiwick of his wife's relatives). Meanwhile, his aunt Ysidra and brother Eduardo Sr. ("Endeng") fled to Baguio city where they thought the Japanese would not go and where there were large Cojuangco apartments. (Endeng's mother-in-law Gregoria Beley Murphy was in Baguio as well.) His relative Antonio stayed behind due to his son's fever.

While Ysidra, her nephews and their families all sought shelter at the Baguio Cathedral during the bombardments, the Antonio Cojuangcos were trapped in the De La Salle College chapel where they were massacred by the desperate Japanese. Only two survived, the siblings Lourdes ("Lulu") and Ramon ("Monching"). Monching's wife, Natividad "Nene" de las Alas, was also hacked to death. Lulu was saved when a bayonet hit Monching's first born, who she was holding. Lulu would later marry Luis Tirso Rivilla of Ormoc City and Monching would later marry Imelda dela Paz Ongsiako.

As the eldest Cojuangco male, Pepe felt partly to blame for the near decimation of the Antonio Cojuangco branch. From that day on, Cojuangco and his relatives never lived in Malate ever again. He sent Monching, Lulu and his own children to the United States for their studies. (Ravenhill Academy, College of Mount Saint Vincent, et al.). He cared for Antonio's children as if they were his own.

== 1950s ==
As his businesses outside of Tarlac flourished, Cojuangco invited the rest of his family to join him. His brother, Itoy, and Antonio's son, Monching, benefited from this arrangement. Eduardo "Danding" Cojuangco Jr., eldest son of Endeng, declined.

In 1953, Endeng became ill and needed treatment in the United States. At that time, the U.S. Dollar was strictly regulated. Don Pepe's wife and holder of the entire clan's purse, Doña Metring, his wife, was unable to obtain the necessary funds to facilitate Endeng's medical expenses. Endeng would shortly die of kidney failure. Also in 1953, President Ramon Magsaysay offered to sell Hacienda Luisita to Cojuangco, as the Hukbalahap rebels caused much fear and the Spanish owners, Compañía General de Tabacos de Filipinas (Tabacalera), wanted to sell. (President Magsaysay was avoiding the wealthier hacienderos from Negros island and Iloilo, specifically the brothers Fernando Lopez and Eugenio Lopez, from owning too much as they already purchased the PASUMIL consortium in Del Carmen, Floridablanca, Pampanga.) Negotiations began but President Magsaysay died when his airplane crashed on Mount Manunggal in Cebu.

The deal was closed five years later during the term of President Carlos Garcia. Hacienda Luisita was the second largest contiguous piece of property in Luzon island. Cojuangco was able to secure American dollars required by Tabacalera. Unlike before, he called on his friend, Philippine Central Bank governor Miguel Cuaderno to help him. The hacienda was separate from the lands his aunt Doña Ysidra Cojuangco assembled in the previous decades. He and his son-in-law, Benigno Aquino Jr. ("Ninoy"), introduced strong social programs favoring the farmers of the hacienda.

While Cojuangco was genuinely loved by the farmers under his management (free healthcare, free schooling, adult education, veterinary medicines for the farm animals, designated areas for employee housing), the stark treatment concerning the dollars relating to Endeng's survival and his subsequent death from kidney failure versus the grand business move in purchasing Hacienda Luisita added insult to injury to Endeng's side of the family. Besides the opposing views in politics and the abandonment of the Antonio Cojuangcos in Manila during the war, the situation concerning his younger brother's death would eventually cause for a collision course between the heirs of Jose Cojuangco Sr and Endeng.

== 1960s ==
In the 1960s, Cojuangco's bus company (Pantranco) and banking arm expanded to open satellite offices all over the country. The Philippine Bank of Commerce (PBC), which he co-founded in 1938, was the preferred intermediary/ local bank of American companies in Manila. He divested from PBC less than a month before the stockholder's meeting to avoid the embarrassment of being unseated by his brother Itoy, his nephew Danding and his other nephew Monching, who wanted greater influence in the bank. Afterwards, he established the First United Bank in May 1963. He also acquired shareholdings in the Manila Trading and Supply Company (Mantrade) during the 1960s.

Due to the geographical proximity of his Hacienda Luisita and the Paniqui Sugar Mills, which he managed on behalf of the entire family, there were times when more than 90% of all raw sugar milled in central Luzon were processed through Cojuangco-owned companies. The Cojuangco family owned so much land in Central Luzon that they could dictate the price of rice and non-Visayan sugar.

== 1970s ==
When the 1970s set in, Don Pepe had already sold all his shares at the PBC to avoid a boardroom coup by the other branches of the Cojuangco family. This was particularly sentimental for Don Pepe, as he was the one who founded PBC and nurtured it from bankruptcy. It was also the one company where he insisted that all four families of the Cojuangco co-own, not knowing that the same generosity will swallow him in his twilight years.

Meanwhile, his bus company Pantranco was coerced to file for bankruptcy after the Marcos-led administration refused to allow rate hikes even when market forces deemed an increase in bus fares. The same happened to Mantrade. Unable to expand his businesses due to political pressures, in 1975, he sold First United Bank. The buyer was the Philippine Government which would evolve the bank to become the United Coconut Planters Bank.

== Political career ==
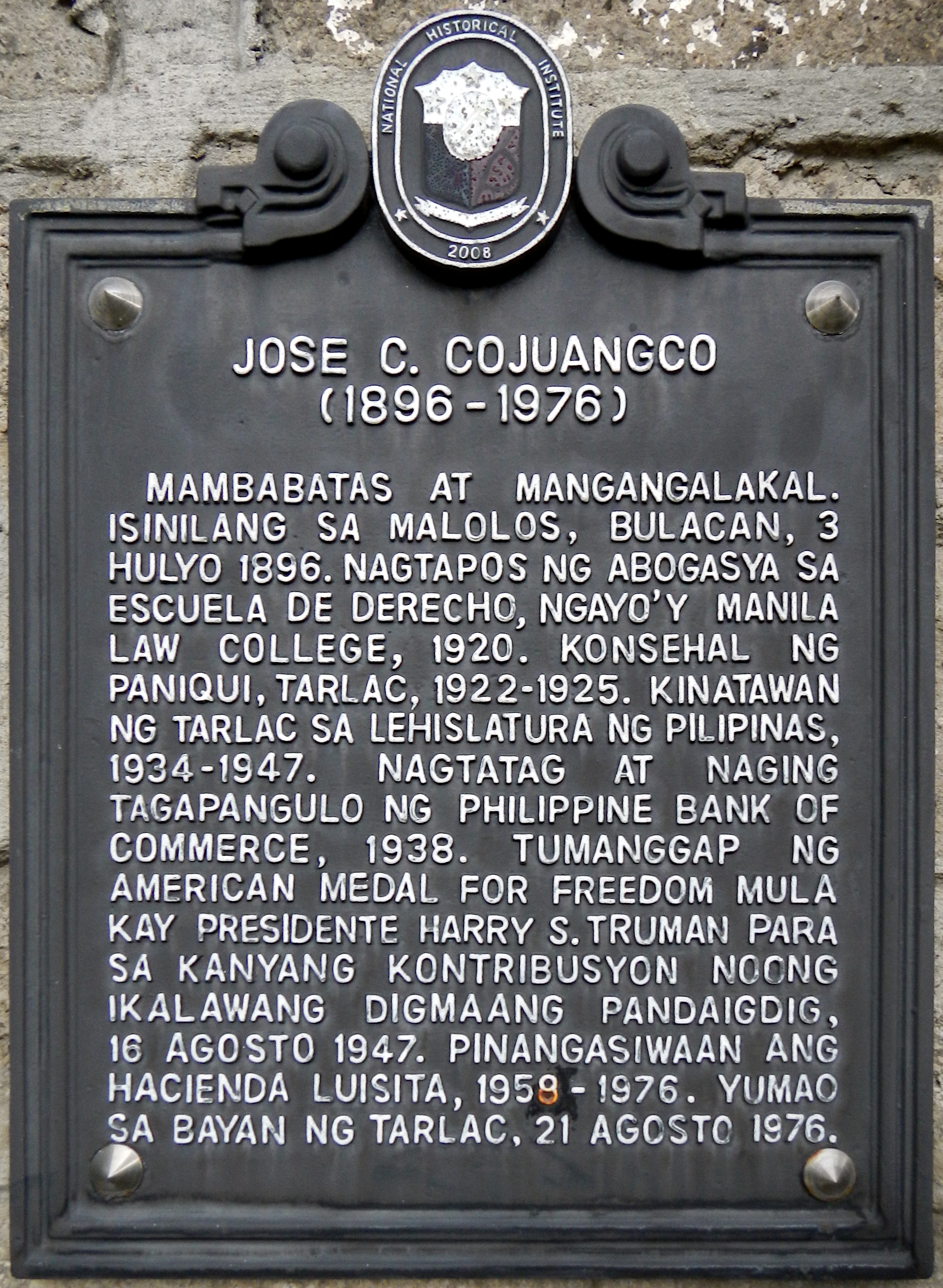
Historical marker installed by the National Historical Institute in 2008 at his childhood home in Malolos

Cojuangco was representative of the First District of Tarlac to the 10th Philippine Legislature in 1934–35, the First Philippine National Assembly in 1935–1938, the Second National Assembly in 1938-1941 and the Third National Assembly in 1941–1946.

He represented Tarlac in the same way that his father Don Melecio Cojuangco did as the first ever representative of Tarlac in the First Philippine Legislature of 1907–1909. (Don Melecio's political career was cut short when he suffered a fatal heart attack in the Urdaneta-Manila train while defending his sons Jose (Pepe) and Juan (Itoy) from American soldiers wanting to sidestep the youngsters from their seats. Mauricio Ilagan served the remaining 4 years (till 1912) of his term).

While in Congress, Don Pepe was one of two representing the province of Tarlac. The other one was Benigno S. Aquino Sr., whose son from his second marriage, Ninoy Aquino became the husband to Don Pepe's daughter, Cory Aquino. In essence, the current Philippine President Noynoy Aquino's paternal and maternal grandfathers sat side by side for Tarlac from 1935 to 1938 and again from 1941 to 1946.

Don Pepe Cojuangco retired from politics after World War II and thus avoided a clash with his younger brother, Eduardo Sr. or Endeng Lalake, the charismatic governor of Tarlac province. When he quit politics, his personal wealth was preserved unlike his good friend and future in-law Benigno Aquino Sr's, whose lands and cash holdings decreased dramatically by using it for social welfare programs in their home province.

== Death ==
He died on August 21, 1976.

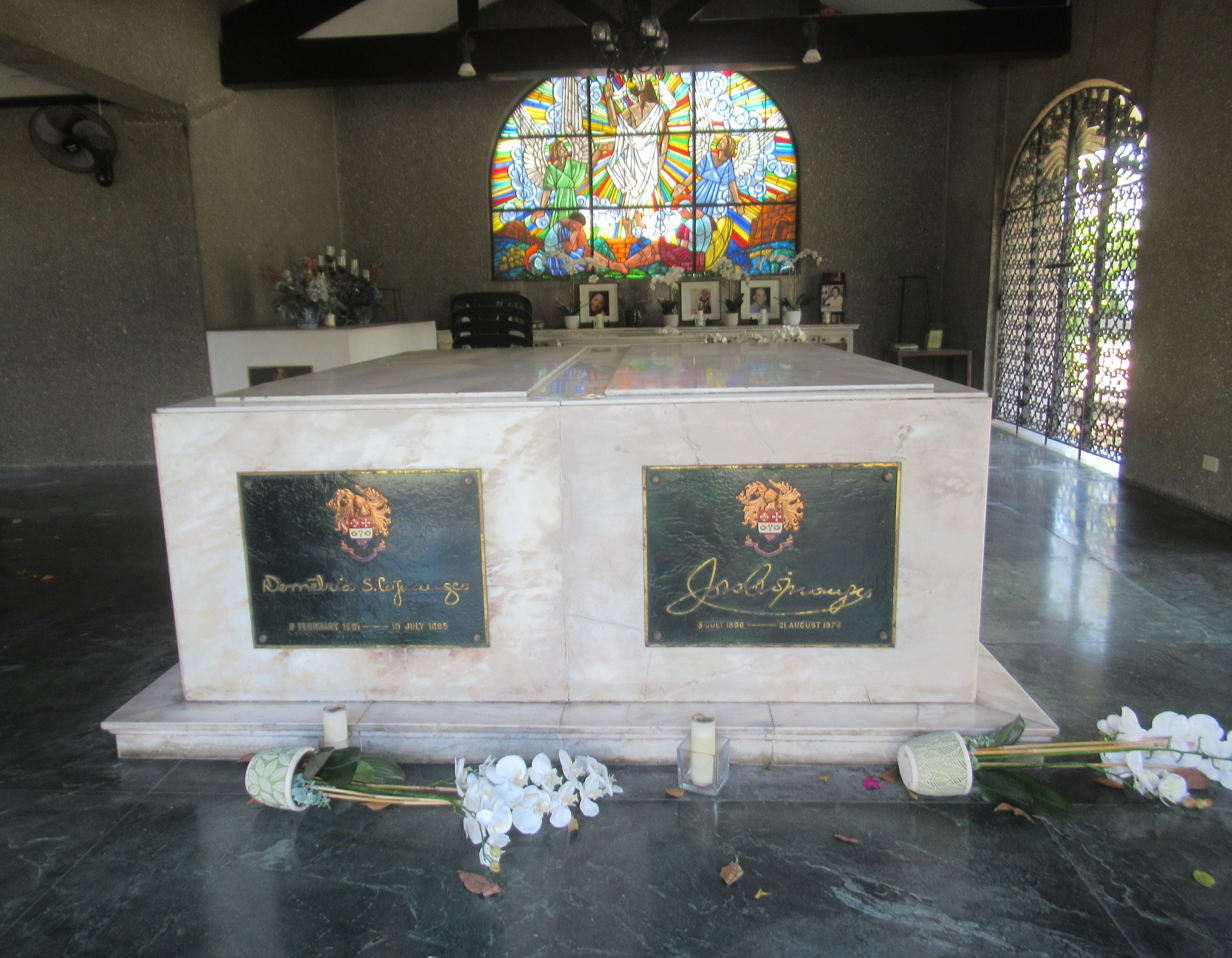
Demetria & Cojuangco's graves at their family mausoleum (Manila Memorial Park – Sucat).

He died during the darkest days of the Martial Law. All of his businesses were under extreme scrutiny by the Marcoses.

Many banks refused to extend credit for fear of government retaliation. Only Chinabank of Binondo, whose owners Don Pepe assisted when they themselves were just starting out, defied the government and helped him. (His granddaughter Victoria Eliza Cojuangco Aquino or Viel, would later marry into this banking family now headed by former Ambassador to the Vatican Howard Dee).

His sons Pete and Peping lost the bid to own the Philippine Long Distance Telephone Company after it was awarded to Monching Cojuangco, Antonio Meer, and brother-in-law Oscar Ongsiako. Monching's wife, Imelda Ongsiako, was a "Blue Lady" of Imelda Marcos and wedding sponsor to presidential daughter Irene Marcos Araneta.

His First United Bank was renamed and was spun off by President Marcos as a front to illegally collect coconut levy funds, hence the reason why United Coconut Planters Bank is sometimes referred to as Cocobank.

The transportation companies he owned with the Lopa family were also lost to Marcos cronies. Benjamin "Kokoy" Romualdez, brother of Philippine First Lady Imelda Marcos, took over the First Manila Management Corp., the mother company of Mantrade (which handled the distribution of Ford Motors and other motor vehicles) and the Pantranco bus company (painted with vibrant hearts of every color, the fleet earned the moniker "Lovebus"), shortly after the death of Cojuangco's business partner, Manuel Lopa, Sr., in 1974. (With his death, the conglomerate lost their immunity from the Marcoses, since Lopa shared a close friendship with Imelda's late uncle, Daniel Romualdez y Zialcita, Speaker Pro Tempore of the Philippine Congress, who died suddenly via a heart attack, a few months before his niece Imelda Marcos rose as Philippine First Lady, in 1965.) Lopa's son (and Cojuangco's son-in-law), Ricardo "Baby" Lopa, was then ousted from the company.

Cojuangco no longer controlled the Bank of Commerce, which was closest to his heart, as it was the first non-agricultural company he founded. Also, it was the last company that, out of family solidarity, he formed insisting that all four branches of the Cojuangco should co-own. His departure from Bank of Commerce left Don Pepe's psyche bruised and his spirit betrayed.

His lawyer, Juan Ponce Enrile, a son of his old friend and attorney, the Spanish mestizo Alfonso Ponce Enrile (father of Armida Siguion Reyna and Irma Potenciano), has since not been able to help him speak to President Marcos even when the latter was the designated Defense Minister.

Neither can his nephew, Danding Cojuangco, a Marcos associate, could do anything to help Cojuangco. He himself comforted his old uncle, saying "Tio Pepe, huwag na po kayong umiyak" (Uncle Pepe, please do not cry).

One of his lasting words to his family was "Kawawa naman si Cory" (Oh how pitiful Cory is!), as he died broken hearted to see this daughter of his harassed and harangued by the Marcos government for being the woman Ninoy Aquino chose as his wife.

In 1979, his last surviving brother, Juan Cojuangco, died. Some of his wealth devolved back to his six nephews and eight nieces. The rest was left to his second wife, Doña Hati, who formed the Cojuangco Aldaba Foundation.

Exactly seven years after his death on August 21, 1976, his son-in-law, Ninoy Aquino, was assassinated on August 21, 1983 triggering the EDSA Revolution 3 years later, in February 1986. It is noted that Ninoy Aquino narrowly escaped death during the Plaza Miranda bombing in Quiapo Manila also on August 21, 1971 where he was scheduled to speak onstage together with Gerry Roxas, Jovito Salonga, Eva Estrada Kalaw, Ramon Bagatsing, and Eddie Ilarde.

Ten years after Don Pepe's death, in 1986, Cory Aquino would become Philippine President, while President Ferdinand Marcos, Benjamin Romualdez, Danding Cojuangco, and their extended families, fled to Hawaii and mainland United States.

== Present ==
At present, Don Pepe Cojuangco's male line is preserved through his elder son, Pedro Cojuangco who has five sons. His younger son and namesake Jose Jr. (Peping), has five daughters.

His grandson through his daughter Corazon, is Senator Benigno Aquino III who sat in the Upper House together with Senator Juan Ponce Enrile, the former Cojuangco family lawyer. With the help of sisters Kris Aquino, Maria Elena Cruz, Aurora Corazon Abellada, Victoria Eliza Dee, plus Antonio Ongsiako Cojuangco, other relatives, Mar Roxas and his family headed by mother Judy Araneta Roxas, and most importantly, numerous volunteers, Noynoy Aquino campaigned and won the Philippine presidency that his mother Cory Aquino once occupied. (One of his opponents was Gilbert Teodoro, Danding Cojuangco's nephew through sister Mercedes).

Hacienda Luisita's ownership is currently being questioned in the media due to proviso verbiage in the sale indicating a land redistribution.

Meanwhile, the Antonio Cojuangco branch lost the Philippine Long Distance Telephone Company through a sale brokered by President Joseph Ejercito Estrada.

The two junior branches of the family, the Eduardo Cojuangcos and the Antonio Cojuangcos, controlled the United Coconut Planters Bank (formerly First United Bank) and the Bank of Commerce, respectively. Recently, San Miguel Corporation (chaired by Danding Cojuangco) acquired the controlling interest in Bank of Commerce from the Antonio Cojuangco branch.

== In popular culture ==
Cojuangco was portrayed by Jim Paredes in the Maalaala Mo Kaya episode entitled Kalapati, the first of the two-part special featuring the love story of Ninoy and Cory Aquino.

== Awards and honours ==
Holy See:

- Knight of the Order of St. Sylvester, knighted by Pope Pius XII.

== External sources ==
- Aquino-Cojuangco Clan
