= Cojuangco clan =

Filipino political clan

Cojuangco 許寰哥
- Political family
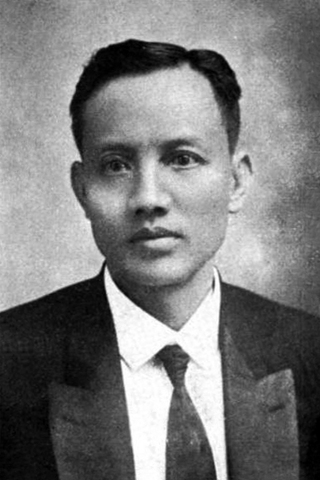
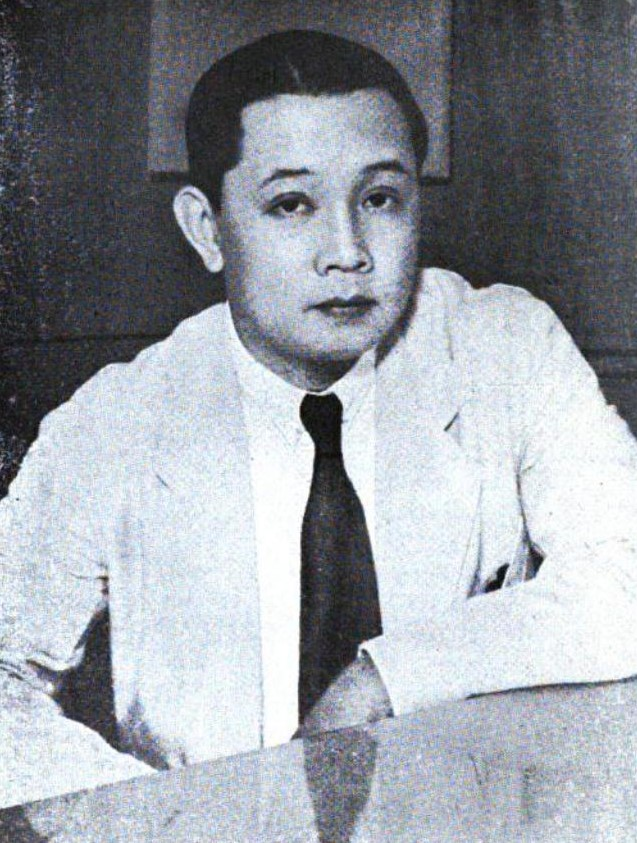
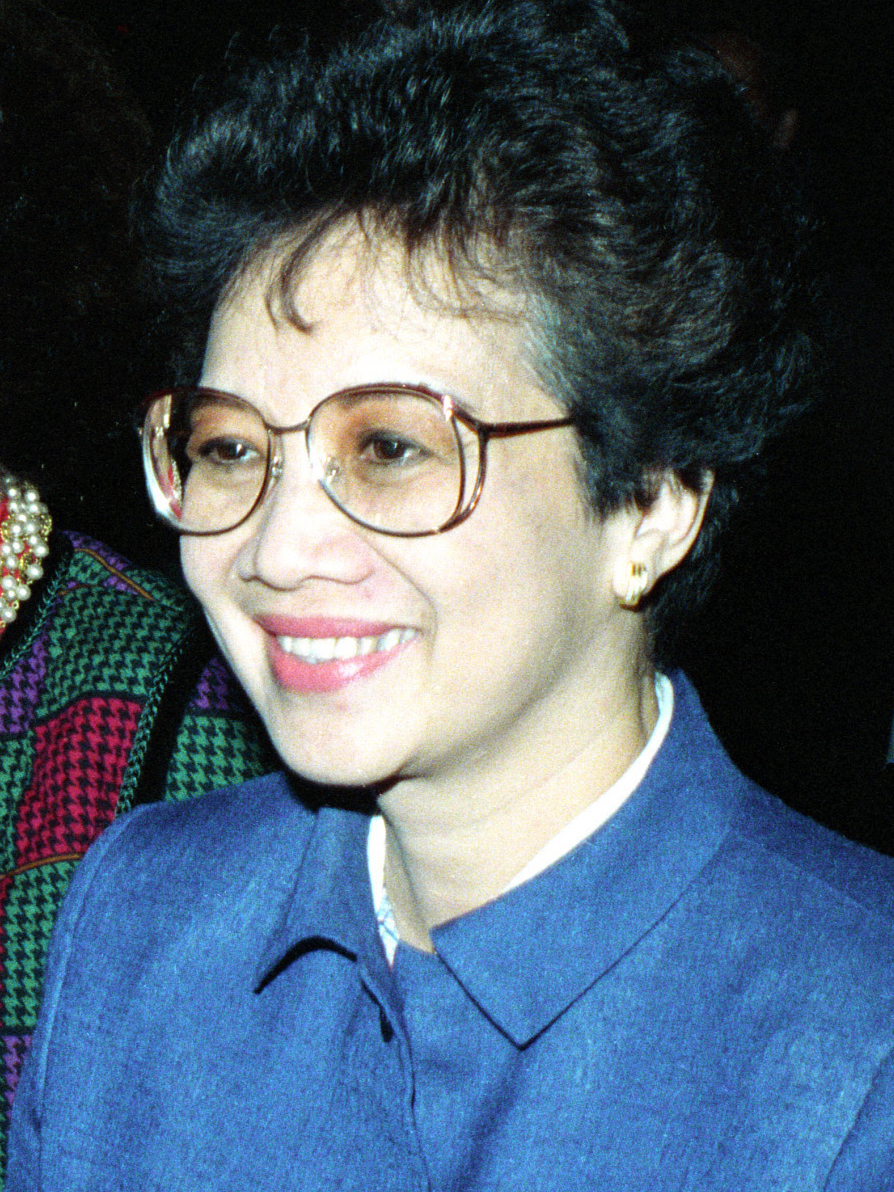
- Melecio Cojuangco José Cojuangco Corazon Aquino
- Country: Philippines
- Current region: Central Luzon, mainly in the province of Tarlac; Metro Manila
- Origin: Fujian, Qing Dynasty
- Founder: Co Yu Hwan (許玉寰; Khó͘ Gio̍k-hoân)
- Members: Benigno Aquino III; Corazon Aquino; Kris Aquino; Eduardo Cojuangco Jr.; José Cojuangco Sr.; José Cojuangco Jr.; Mark Cojuangco; Charlie Cojuangco; Jaime Cojuangco; Mikee Cojuangco-Jaworski; Gilbert Cojuangco Teodoro; Josephine Cojuangco-Reyes and others
- Connected members: Ninoy Aquino; Rio Diaz; Tingting Cojuangco; Robert Jaworski Jr.
- Connected families: Aquino; Sumulong

The Cojuangco (Chinese: 許寰哥; Pe̍h-ōe-jī: Khó͘-hoân-ko; pronounced [kʰɔ˦ huan˨ ko˦]; Kapampangan: [koˈ(x)wəŋku]; Tagalog: [k̠oˈhwaŋ.k̠o]) clan is a prominent Filipino family descended from Co Yu Hwan (許玉寰; Khó͘ Gio̍k-hoân), a Sangley Chinese Filipino who migrated to the Philippines in 1861 from Hongjian Village, Jiaomei Township, Zhangzhou, Fujian. He was commonly called in Hokkien Chinese: 寰哥; Pe̍h-ōe-jī: Hoân-ko; lit. 'Brother Juan' or together with his surname in Hokkien Chinese: 許寰哥; Pe̍h-ōe-jī: Khó͘ Hoân-ko; lit. 'Brother Juan Co' among Chinese Filipinos who are historically mostly Hokkien, and during the Spanish era of the Philippines, the latter name with honorific was typically written and spelled using Spanish orthography to produce "Cojuangco" (Spanish: [koˈxwãŋ.ko]). He adopted the Christian name José Cojuangco ("El Chino" José) in 1865 when he moved to Bulacan.

The Cojuangco clan is among the most powerful and influential families in the Philippines, exercising economic control over several banks (such as Bank of Commerce) and trade houses, notably the sugar trade (Hacienda Luisita and Central Azucarera de Tarlac). The clan has at various time been highly involved in Philippine politics, with several members having entered public office in both local and national positions.

== Alphabetical listing of family members ==
- Benigno Simeon "Noynoy" Cojuangco Aquino III, fifteenth President of the Philippines (2010–2016)
- Maria Corazon "Cory" Sumulong Cojuangco Aquino, eleventh President of the Philippines (1986–1992)
- Kristina Bernadette Cojuangco Aquino, actress
- Eduardo "Danding" Cojuangco, businessman and politician
- Carlos "Charlie" Cojuangco, politician
- Jaime Cojuangco, politician
- José "Pepe" Cojuangco Sr., politician (grandson and namesake of José "El Chino" Cojuangco)
- José "Peping" Cojuangco Jr., politician
- Marcos "Mark" Cojuangco, politician
- Antonio "Tony Boy" O. Cojuangco Jr., businessman (former Chairman & President of PLDT, ABC-5 now TV5 Network) & partner of celebrity actress Gretchen Barretto
- Mikee Cojuangco Jaworski, equestrienne and actress
- Gilbert Cojuangco Teodoro, lawyer and politician
- Josephine Cojuangco Reyes, educator and school administrator
- Sophie Albert, actress (granddaughter of Josephine C. Reyes)
