= UCPB =

UCPB may refer to:

- United Civic Party of Belarus
- United Coconut Planters Bank, a defunct Philippine bank
