= Josephine C. Reyes =

Filipina educator

Josephine Cojuangco-Reyes
- Born: Josephine Sumulong Cojuangco; November 26, 1927; Intramuros, Manila, Philippine Islands
- Died: July 26, 2011 (aged 83); Taguig, Philippines
- Occupation: Educator
- Known for: Served as the seventh president of the Far Eastern University
- Spouse: Nicanor Reyes Jr.
- Children: 4
- Parents: José Cojuangco (father); Demetria Sumulong (mother)
- Relatives: Juan Sumulong (grandfather); Lorenzo Sumulong (uncle); Victor Sumulong (first cousin); Francisco Sumulong (uncle)
- Family: Cojuangco

Josephine Cojuangco Reyes (born Josephine Sumulong Cojuangco, November 26, 1927 – July 26, 2011) was a Filipina educator. She served as the seventh president of the Far Eastern University (FEU) in Manila, Philippines from 1985 to 1989. She also served as the president of the Philippine Association of Colleges and Universities from 1987 to 1988, and the chair of the board of trustees of the Far Eastern University – Nicanor Reyes Medical Foundation until 2011.

== Education ==
Cojuangco-Reyes earned her A.B. degree at the Far Eastern University in 1953 graduating Cum Laude, Master of Arts in Speech Education and a Professional Diploma in Administration of Colleges and Universities at the Teachers College, Columbia University, Columbia Honorary Doctorate in Education from the Dewey International University, and Doctor of Pedagogy (Honoris causa) from the University of Manila.

== Personal life ==
Born to José C. Cojuangco Sr., former representative of the 1st district of Tarlac, and Demetria Sumulong-Cojuangco, daughter of former senator Juan M. Sumulong Sr. of Antipolo, Rizal, Cojuangco-Reyes was the eldest sister of the first female president of the Philippines Corazon S. Cojuangco-Aquino and former Tarlac representative Jose S. Cojuangco Jr. She was also the sister-in-law of former senator Ninoy Aquino and cousin of former San Miguel Corporation chairman and CEO Danding Cojuangco.

She was married to Nicanor M. Reyes, Jr., sixth president of the Far Eastern University and eldest son of its founder. They had four children, Marie Therese, Nicanor III, Joaquin Jose, and Enrique Robert. Among her nephews and nieces were Benigno S. Aquino III, the 15th president of the Philippines, actress Kris Aquino, and equestrienne and International Olympic Committee member Mikee Cojuangco-Jaworski.

She was the grandmother of actress Bianca Regina R. Abrenica, known as Sophie Albert, and Juan Enrique J. Reyes, the second president of the Far Eastern University – Nicanor Reyes Medical Foundation.

== Death ==
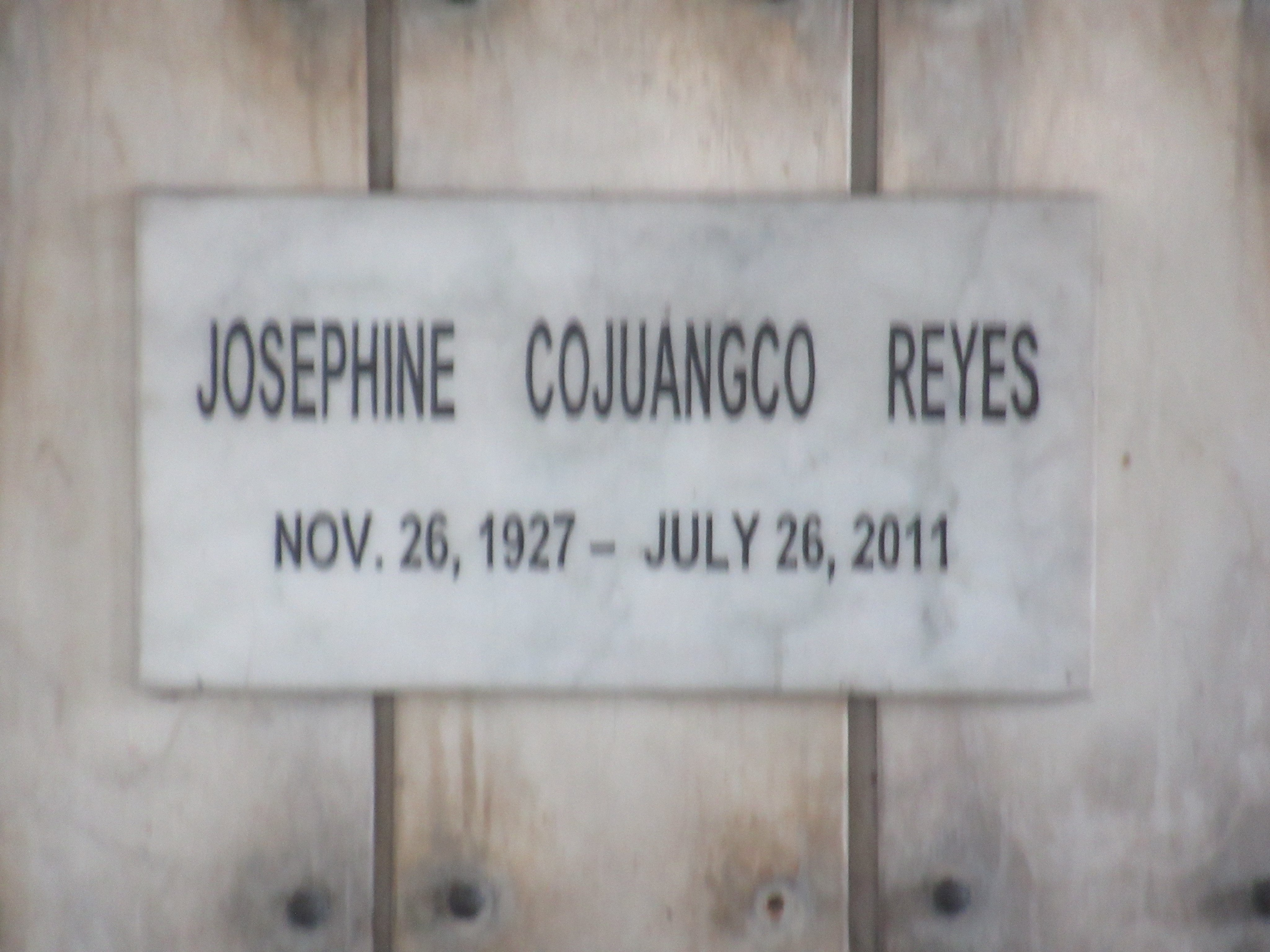
Reyes' grave at their family mausoleum (Manila Memorial Park – Sucat).

Cojuangco-Reyes died on 26 July 2011, shortly after collapsing following her eulogy during the funeral of her elder brother Pedro.

== Board memberships ==
- Director and Vice-president, Central Azucarera de Tarlac
- President, Luisita Realty Corporation
