= Coco Levy Fund scam =

1970s–80s Filipino controversy

The Coco Levy Fund Scam was a controversy in the 1970s and 1980s in the Philippines involving former President Ferdinand Marcos and his cronies. It was alleged that Marcos, Danding Cojuangco, Juan Ponce Enrile, and others conspired to tax coconut farmers, promising them the development of the coconut industry and a share of the investments, but on the contrary used the collection fund for personal profit, particularly in the purchase of United Coconut Planters Bank (UCPB) and a majority stake in San Miguel Corporation (SMC), to name two.

The issue is still ongoing up to this day, with coconut farmers fighting for justice against the forced taxation, and a share of the Coco Levy Fund's investments. The Coco Levy Fund is estimated to have ballooned anywhere in the range of ₱100 billion to 150 billion in assets.

In 2012, a Supreme Court decision awarded ₱71 billion in coconut levy funds to coconut farmers.

== Background ==
The Philippine coconut industry was responsible for 26% of the volume of the agricultural sector and was reportedly present in 68 of the 81 provinces of the country. Next to sugar, coconut products was also the leading agricultural export of the Philippines, with 37 products and by-products that were exported to 114 countries. The major exports were crude and refined oil, copra meal, desiccated coconut, activated carbon, and oleo-chemicals. About one-third of the Philippine population depended mainly on coconut production for its livelihood.

The legal beginnings of the levy can be found in Republic Act 1145 enacted on 17 June 1954 under President Ramon Magsaysay, which called for the creation of the Coconut Development Fund. Subsequent amendments were made with the enactment of Republic Act 6260 on 19 June 1971 under President Ferdinand Marcos. The act called for the creation of a Coconut Investment Fund and a Coconut Investment Company (CIC). The objective of the CIC was to: (a) To fully tap the potential of the coconut planters in order to maximize their production and give them greater responsibility in directing and developing the coconut industry; (b) to accelerate the growth of the coconut industry and other related coconut products from the raw material stage to the semi-finished and finally, the finished product stage; (c) to improve, develop and expand the marketing system; and (d) to ensure stable and better incomes for coconut farmers. President Marcos created other funds through P.D. 276, 582, 1468, 961, and 1841, all were to be paid by farmers. Under the idea of "developing PH coco industry", coco farmers paid ₱15-₱30 per ₱100 kilos of copra, constituting 10-25% of their income.

On 30 June 1973, President Marcos created the Philippine Coconut Authority through P.D. 232. The PCA's mandate was "to promote accelerated growth and development of the coconut and other palm oils industry so that the benefits of such growth shall accrue to the greatest number, and to provide continued leadership and support in the integrated development of the industry." The said decree also consolidated the responsibilities and activities of the Coconut Coordinating Council (CCC), the Philippine Coconut Administration (PHILCOA), and the Philippine Coconut Research Institute (PHILCORIN), under one office. P.D. 961 created the Coconut Industry Investment Fund (CIIF), which was allegedly used by Danding Cojuangco to purchase shares of San Miguel Corporation. and was then the largest company and single largest contributor to the national GDP and treasury. CIIF was also used to purchase the so-called "big crony-owned" oil mills (known as CIIF-Oil Mills Group) and shares of coco trading and insurance corporations. While the other decrees made ballooning funds, P.D. 1468 revised the Coco Industry Code, supposedly giving crony oil mills control over the said funds. Most coconut farmers and tenants received receipts for paying, but were not registered by PHILCOA.

An audit report showed that the coco levy fund was also used to fund Imelda Marcos's projects, such as the 1974 Miss Universe Pageant and the Coconut Palace construction.

In 1975, for two years, coco levy funds paid by coco farmers amounted to ₱2.14 million, but only 32% of receipts were registered. After P.D. 961 of 1976, and public display of cronyism, such as turning over coco funds to Cojuangco and Defense Minister Juan Ponce Enrile, coco farmers defied martial law in protests. Small protests and defiance were shown by turning CocoFed groups into anti-Marcos meetings. Coco farmers coops/protests grew by 1980 and became a solid foundation of the anti-Marcos movement in the countryside. The Marcos dictatorship met the coco farmers' resistance with violence. Most notable of which are the Daet and Guinayangan (Quezon) massacres.

By 1982, coco levy funds extracted ₱70 billion from coco farmers. Every penny was used by Marcos cronies to entrench themselves in wealth. The funds were siphoned by Marcos and his cronies into at least 14 holding companies: Soriano Shares Inc., ASC Investors Inc., Roxas Shares Inc., ARC Investors Inc., Toda Holdings Inc., AP Holdings Inc., Fernandez Holdings Inc., SMC Officers Corps Inc., Te Deum Resources Inc., Anglo Ventures Inc., Randy Allied Ventures Inc., Rock Steel Resources Inc., Valhalla Properties Ltd Inc., and First Meridian Development Inc.

Additionally, over the 10 years of collection, Cojuangco, Maria Clara Lobregat, and Enrile were board members or chairpersons of PCA, UCPB, COCOFED and Unicom. Enrile, then Senate President, was chair of PCA and Unicom, which he used to get equities from Primex Coco, Pacific Royal, Clear Mineral, and other entities. Danding Cojuangco allegedly used his coco levy positions to funnel money and was used as leverage to further his businesses. Most notable were the UCPB and the SMC, both of which were supposedly purchased directly through coco levy money by Imelda Marcos and Danding Cojuangco.

After the Marcos regime was toppled by the People Power Revolution of 1986, coconut farmers filed numerous cases against Marcos, Cojuangco, and Enrile for squandering farmers' money.

== The Coco Levy litigations ==
The Coco Levy Case (Sandiganbayan Civil Case No. 33) is subdivided into a total of eight cases that involve different parties and properties. Arguably, the most important case is Case No. 33-F, which involves 51% of the shares of mega-conglomerate San Miguel Corporation (SMC). This majority stake at SMC had been further subdivided into three separate litigations, each of which reaching the Supreme Court in highly contentious proceedings.

The first case involved 4% of SMC shares, which, in the case of San Miguel Corporation vs. Sandiganbayan, was awarded by the Supreme Court to the government. The second case, Republic of the Philippines vs. Sandiganbayan and Eduardo Cojuangco Jr., involved a 20% block that the Supreme Court, voting 7–4, awarded to Eduardo "Danding" Cojuangco. In 2012, the Supreme Court issued a decision in Philippine Coconut Producers Federation, Inc. (COCOFED) vs. Republic of the Philippines, where the Court, voting 11–0, declared that the remaining 27% of San Miguel is owned by the government. (Note: The 27% had been diluted to 24% due to the government's failure to subscribe to the increased authorized capital stock of San Miguel.)

On December 10, 2014, the Supreme Court reaffirmed its September 4, 2012, decision to award to farmers the coco levy fund.

On December 18, 2024, the Sandiganbayan rejected six civil cases "due to inordinate delay in the proceedings." The decision was penned by Geraldine Econg, whom President Bongbong Marcos appointed as Sandiganbayan presiding judge in January 2025. Judy Taguiwalo of the Campaign Against the Return of the Marcoses and Martial Law protested Econg's appointment, stating "With Econg now at the helm of the Sandiganbayan, we can expect more dismissals of the Marcoses' ill-gotten wealth cases". On March 17, 2026, another civil case was dismissed due to inordinate delays.

== Moves to return funds to farmers ==
In 2015, the government certified a bill creating a trust fund for farmers as urgent. The bill passed in the House of Representatives but stalled in the Senate.

On February 26, 2021, President Rodrigo Duterte signed the Coconut Farmers and Industry Trust Fund Act, creating a trust fund for the country's coconut farmers. In June 2022, Duterte signed an executive order implementing the Coconut Farmers and Industry Development Plan, which aims to increase productivity and income of coconut farmers, modernize the coconut industry, and pave the way for the release of the ₱75 billion trust fund for coconut farmers consisting of coco levy assets declared state property by the Supreme Court.

== See also ==
- Workers' resistance against the Marcos dictatorship
- Cronies of Ferdinand Marcos
- Corruption in the Philippines
- List of political scandals in the Philippines
