= Sumulong =

Sumulong is a surname, meaning "to advance" or "to progress", in Filipino. Notable persons with that name include:

- Juan Sumulong (1875–1942), Filipino revolutionary, journalist, lawyer, educator, and politician
- Lorenzo Sumulong (1905–1997), Filipino politician and senator
- Francisco Sumulong (1918–2004), Filipino politician
- María Corazón Sumulong Cojuangco-Aquino (popularly known as Corazon "Cory" Aquino) (1933–2009), Filipina politician and President of the Philippines (1986–1992)
- José Sumulong Cojuangco Jr. (born 1934), former Filipino congressman
- Josephine Sumulong Cojuangco-Reyes (1927–2011), Filipina educator
- Victor Sumulong (1946–2009), Filipino politician

== See also ==
- Sumulong Highway, a highway in the Philippines named after Juan Sumulong
- Juan Sumulong Memorial Junior College, Taytay, Rizal, Philippines
