= United Coconut Planters Bank =

Bank in the Philippines

United Coconut Planters Bank (UCPB)
- Type: State-owned subsidiary
- Industry: Financial services
- Founded: May 15, 1963; 63 years ago in Manila, Philippines
- Founder: José Cojuangco
- Defunct: March 1, 2022; 4 years ago
- Fate: Merged into Land Bank of the Philippines with Land Bank as the surviving entity
- Headquarters: Makati, Philippines
- Key people: Danilo V. Pulido (Acting Chairman of the Board); Liduvino S. Geron (Officer-in-Charge)
- Products: Banking services, insurance
- Net income: ₱3.3 billion (2015)
- Number of employees: 4,064 (2016)
- Website: www.ucpb.com

The United Coconut Planters Bank, more popularly known by its initials, UCPB, or by its old name, Cocobank, was a Filipino government-owned bank and was one of the largest banks in the Philippines, having ranked within the top twenty banks in the country in terms of assets. It was the only existing universal bank not listed on the Philippine Stock Exchange. The bank, owing to its name, catered heavily to coconut farmers, but also served a wide-ranging clientele.

In the 1970s and 1980s, the bank was significantly involved in the Coco Levy Fund scam under the leadership of chairman Juan Ponce Enrile and company president Danding Cojuangco.

In July 2020, the Philippine government raised its stake with the bank to 97%, thus resulting for its conversion to a government controlled bank.

Effective March 1, 2022, UCPB merged with Land Bank of the Philippines (LBP), with the latter as the surviving entity.

As of February 1, 2024, UCPB Savings Bank still survives as a wholly owned subsidiary of LBP as its thrift bank affiliate. It was put up for sale on September 2024 eventually ending up being bought by Philippine Veterans Bank.

== History ==
The last incarnation of the original logo of UCPB, which lasted from the 1980s until 2009.

The UCPB was established on May 15, 1963 as First United Bank (FUB) by José Cojuangco, the father of Philippine president Corazon Aquino. Cojuangco founded the bank after resigning as president of the Philippine Bank of Commerce in anticipation of his impending removal by his brother Juan and nephews Monching and Danding Cojuangco. He served as president of FUB, while his eldest son Pedro served as senior vice president and treasurer. With only four branches at the time, it was a small commercial bank.

In mid-1975, the Philippine Coconut Authority (PCA), headed by Defense Secretary Juan Ponce Enrile, purchased in the name of coconut farmers the 72.2% of First United Bank shares owned by Cojuangco. The purchase came after President Ferdinand Marcos issued Presidential Decree No. 755 (or P.D. No. 755) on July 29, 1975, which instructed the PCA to "formulate and recommend for adoption credit policies affecting production, marketing and processing of coconut and other palm oils" and "to provide readily available credit facilities to the coconut farmers at preferential rates." Businessman Eduardo "Danding" Cojuangco, a nephew of Jose Cojuangco who negotiated as a third party with his counsel Edgardo Angara for the bank's purchase, was then elected president of the newly renamed United Coconut Planters Bank based on his signed agreement with the PCA, while Enrile became chairman of its board of directors. The PCA's purchase was later deemed to have been financed by the coconut levy fund scam.

Cocobank was the official short bank name in the 1980s and the early 1990s. In February 1981, UCPB became the first private commercial bank in the Philippines to be given a universal banking license.

In 1990, UCPB, along with Equitable Banking Corporation (now Banco de Oro Universal Bank), Philippine National Bank and the Far East Bank and Trust Company (now the Bank of the Philippine Islands), formed MegaLink, one of the three main interbank networks in the Philippines. However, UCPB's ATM services date back to the 1980s, when it was one of the first financial institutions to offer ATM services. It established its pre-need services arm, Cocoplans, in 1993.

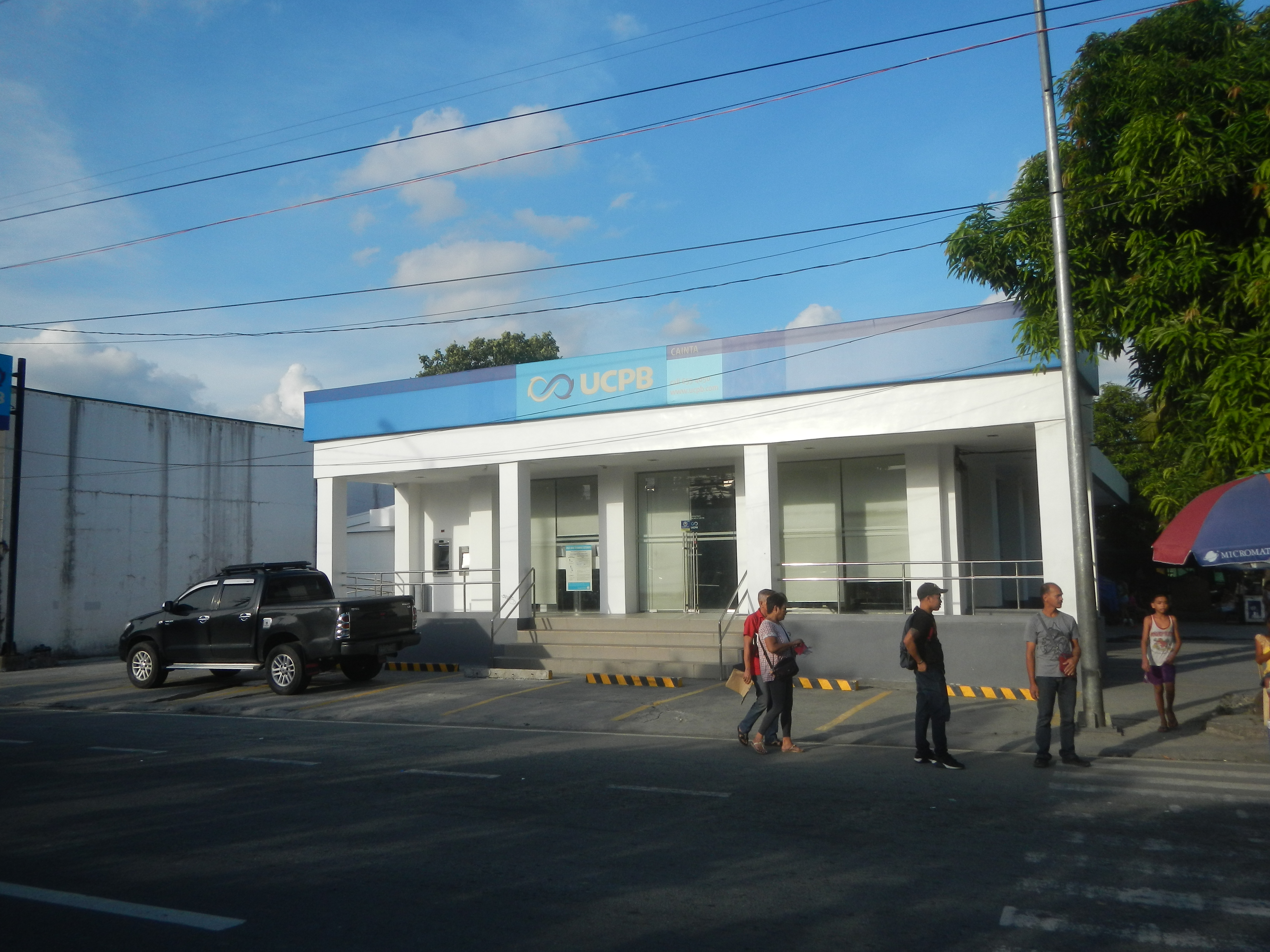
A UCPB branch in Cainta, Rizal

The bank was also heavily involved in social development projects and other charity works. It had a total at its peak, 188 branches and 279 ATMs nationwide. It is also the only universal bank to have a rural banking subsidiary, although this has since been merged into its thrift banking operations since late 2005. In 2009, UCPB rebranded and updated its logo for the first time in 29 years. The rebranding efforts were led by Tangible Brand Consultants. On November, the last quarter of 2015, UCPB became a member of BancNet.

In 2018, the bank started its conversion to a government bank, joining the league of LandBank, Development Bank of the Philippines and Overseas Filipino Bank. Later in 2020, the Philippine government dropped the privatization plans of the bank by further raising its stake of ownership from 75% to 97%, thus resulting furthermore for UCPB in becoming a state-owned and controlled bank.

=== Merger with LandBank ===
On June 25, 2021, President Rodrigo Duterte signed an Executive Order No. 142 to merge Land Bank of the Philippines with the UCPB, with the former as the surviving entity.

== Subsidiaries and affiliates ==
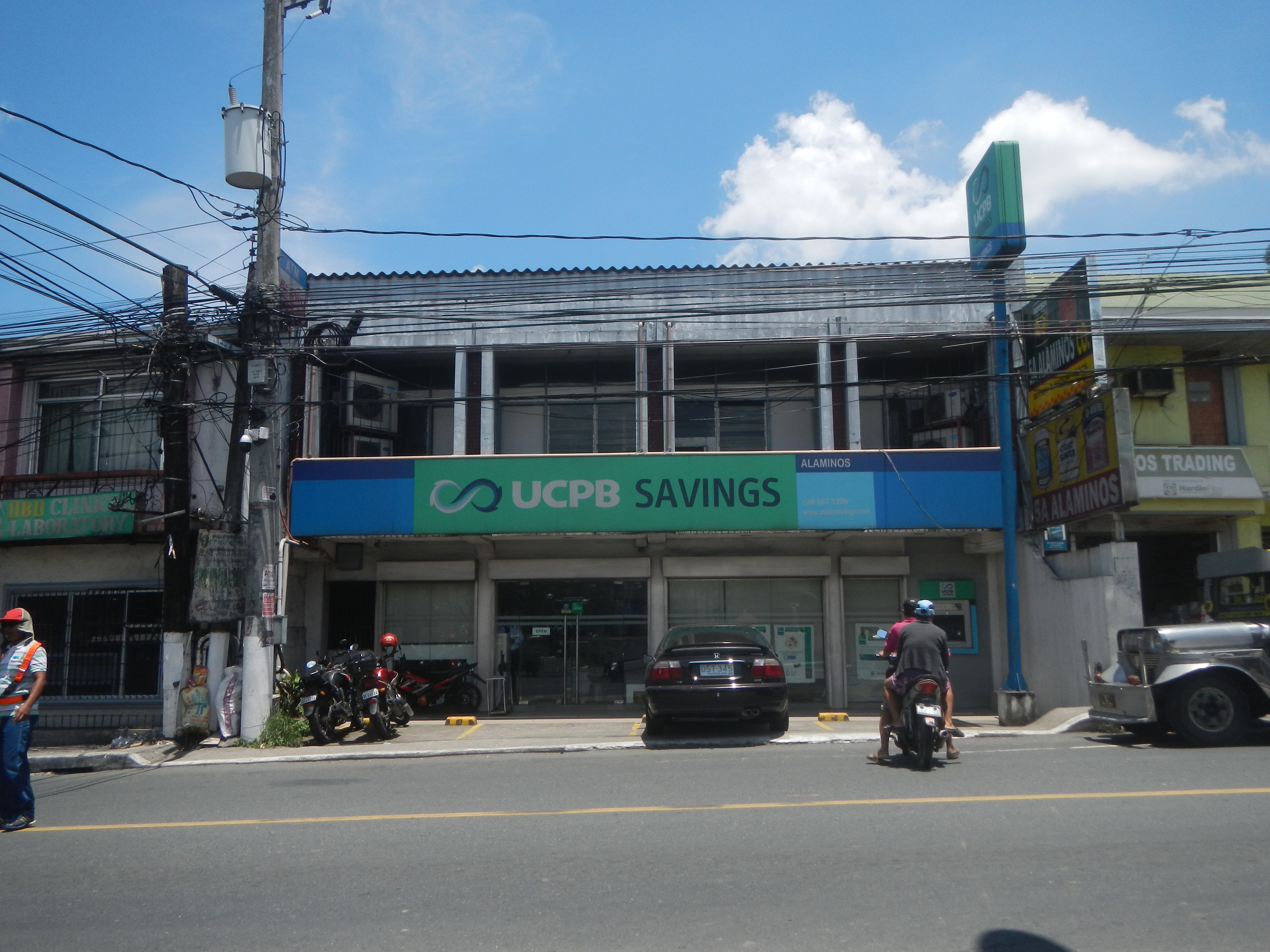
A UCPB Savings Bank branch in Alaminos, Laguna

Subsidiaries of UCPB were the following:

- UCPB Leasing and Finance Corporation
- UCPB Savings Bank
- UCPB Securities, Inc.

== Competition ==
Due to its position as a universal bank, UCPB competed primarily against major Philippine banks like Metrobank, Banco de Oro, EastWest Bank, BPI, Land Bank of the Philippines and PNB.

As a state-controlled bank, it joined the league in competition even if for a short while with other government banks - Development Bank of the Philippines, Land Bank of the Philippines and Overseas Filipino Bank.

== See also ==
- List of banks in the Philippines
- MegaLink
- BancNet
