= Jiaomei =

Town in Fujian Province, China

Coordinates: 24.5295°N 117.8952°E

Jiaomei (Chinese: 角美镇; pinyin: Jiǎoměi Zhèn; Pe̍h-ōe-jī: Kak-bóe-tìn) is a Town in the portion of Longhai City north of the Jiulong River, in the municipal region of Zhangzhou, Fujian.

== Presidential ties ==
Democracy icon Corazon Aquino and her son, Benigno S. Aquino III (the tenth and fifteenth Presidents of the Philippines, respectively) have Hongjian Village as their ancestral village. Both are members of the influential Chinese-Filipino Cojuangco clan, and thus are direct descendants of Hongjian native Co Yu Hwan (Christian name: José Cojuangco), who emigrated to Spanish Philippines in 1861. During their respective terms as president, both mother and son conducted state visits to the People's Republic of China, stopping by Hongjian to venerate their ancestors and reconnect with distant relatives.

== Transport ==
The town lies along National Route 324, with which the Jiaomei-Haicang Road makes a T-junction downtown.

== Administration ==
The town runs 32 Village committees:

- Banmei (坂美村)
- Ketang (课堂村)
- Shazhou (沙州村)
- Wuzhai (吴宅村)
- Yujiang (玉江村)
- Liuzhuan (流传村)
- Hengcang (恒仓村)
- Puwei (埔尾村)
- Yangcuo (杨厝村)
- Caidian (蔡店村)
- Shaban (沙坂村)
- Shimei (石美村)
- Nanmen (南门村)
- Kengtou (埭头村)
- Xibian (西边村)
- Dongshan (东山村)
- Shicuo (石厝村)
- Shetou (社头村)
- Xiashi (下士村)
- Longtian (龙田村)
- Tianli (田里村)
- Putou (铺透村)
- Longjiang (龙江村)
- Hongdai (洪岱村)
- Fujing (福井村)
- Shangfang (上房村)
- Mianzhai (锦宅村)
- Qiaotou (桥头村)
- Hongjian (鸿渐村)
- Jinshan (金山村)
- Baijiao (白礁村)
- Dongmei (东美村)
