= First United Bank =

American banking institution

First United Bank & Trust
- Company type: Private
- Industry: Banking
- Founded: (as "Durant National Bank") Durant, Oklahoma (1900)
- Headquarters: Durant, Oklahoma, United States
- Key people: Greg Massey, Chairman/CEO
- Products: Financial services
- Total assets: $13.5 billion (2021)
- Number of employees: 1,945
- Website: www.firstunitedbank.com

First United Bank is a banking institution headquartered in Durant, Oklahoma that specializes in personal and commercial banking, investment management, insurance, and mortgage products. First United controls $13 billion in combined assets and is the 7th largest bank in Oklahoma. There are 85 locations located throughout Oklahoma and Texas.

First United is owned by the Massey family. Former Oklahoma state senator John Massey served as chairman until 2020. His son, Greg Massey leads the bank as chairman and chief executive officer.

== History ==
First United began as Durant National Bank on Oct. 2, 1900, when it first opened in Bryan County, Choctaw Nation Territory (known today as Durant, Oklahoma). In 1915, Durant National Bank absorbed eight banks in the Oklahoma region, and, in 1916, constructed a new building in Durant at 2nd and Main Streets. In 1963, Durant National Bank was renamed to Durant Bank & Trust, becoming one of the first banks in Oklahoma to have full trust powers. Durant Bank & Trust was then renamed to be First United Bank in 1998.

John Massey, an Oklahoma native, joined Durant Bank & Trust in 1966 as a director and was appointed chairman of the board in 1986. At that time, he also became the majority shareholder and CEO. Greg Massey joined the bank in 1990, and succeeded his father as CEO in 2003. After a series of acquisitions, including the merger with American Bank of Texas in 2016, First United has grown to 73 locations in Oklahoma and Texas with $12.5 billion in assets.
