= Danding Cojuangco =

Filipino politician and businessman (1935–2020)

The Honorable Danding Cojuangco

Member of the Philippine House of Representatives from Tarlac's 1st District
- In office December 30, 1969 – September 23, 1972
- Preceded by: José Cojuangco Jr.
- Succeeded by: Vacant (Note: Congress was dissolved when President Marcos declared Martial Law on September 23, 1972.); Post later held by Jose Cojuangco Jr.

20th Governor of Tarlac
- In office December 30, 1967 – December 30, 1969
- Vice Governor: Nicolas Feliciano
- Preceded by: Benigno Aquino Jr.
- Succeeded by: Jose Macapinlac

Chairman of the Philippine Racing Commission
- In office 1975–1978
- President: Ferdinand Marcos
- Preceded by: Office established
- Succeeded by: Nemesio Yabut

Personal details
- Born: Eduardo Murphy Cojuangco Jr. June 10, 1935 Paniqui, Tarlac, Philippine Islands
- Died: June 16, 2020 (aged 85) Taguig, Metro Manila, Philippines
- Party: NPC (1991–2020)
- Other political affiliations: Nacionalista (1967–1978; 1986–1991); KBL (1978–1986)
- Spouse: Soledad "Gretchen" Oppen (m. 1956)
- Children: 6 (including Mark and Charlie)
- Relatives: Cojuangco family
- Education: University of the Philippines Los Baños; California Polytechnic State University
- Occupation: Politician, businessman

Military service
- Allegiance: Philippines
- Branch/service: Philippine Air Force
- Rank: Colonel
- Unit: Reserves

Eduardo "Danding" Murphy Cojuangco Jr. (June 10, 1935 – June 16, 2020) was a Filipino businessman and politician. He was the chairman and CEO of San Miguel Corporation, the largest food and beverage corporation in the Philippines and Southeast Asia. He served as a Philippine ambassador and governor of Tarlac. In 2016, his personal wealth was estimated at US$1.16 billion, and it was estimated that at one time, his business empire accounted for 25% of the gross national product of the Philippines.

== Early life and education ==
Eduardo Murphy Cojuangco Jr. was born on June 10, 1935, the first-born child of Eduardo Chichioco Cojuangco and Josephine B. Murphy. He completed his high school education at De La Salle College. He attended UP Los Baños and California Polytechnic State University, San Luis Obispo.

== Life during the Marcos administration ==
Cojuangco's close relationship with Philippine president Ferdinand E. Marcos earned him a reputation as one of the late dictator's most powerful "cronies". He was called "one of the country's leading businessmen".

=== Role during Martial Law ===
Cojuangco was the only civilian among the "Rolex 12", a group of 12 men who planned and enforced the 1972 imposition of Martial Law. He was accused of being the mastermind behind Benigno Aquino Jr.'s assassination by one of the military men convicted in the Aquino-Galman murder case, although Aquino's daughter Kris has stated that whomever she believes killed her father she could "categorically say not Danding Cojuangco."

=== Coco Levy Fund controversy ===
Cojuangco was implicated in the Coco Levy Fund controversy, a decades-long dispute over funds acquired by the Philippine Government when the Marcos administration levied a tax on copra sold by the Philippines' coconut farmers from 1973 to 1982.

The stated intent of the plan, spearheaded by Cojuangco, was to develop the Philippine coconut industry. But the amount, consolidated in the United Coconut Planters Bank (UCPB), was alleged to have instead been channelled to the private financial interests of the Marcos family and their close associates. The government alleged Cojuangco to have used the coconut levy funds to gain control of a 72.2% stake in United Coconut Planters Bank in 1975; and a total stake of about 47% San Miguel Corporation in 1983, in two blocks of about 20% and 27%, respectively. The coco funds were also used to acquire six oil mills. In 1975, funds from the levy were used by the government to acquire a 72.2% stake in United Coconut Planters Bank (UCPB, then still known as First United Bank).

In 1983, Cojuangco acquired a 20% stake in San Miguel Corporation, which the Presidential Commission on Good Government later said he did using the windfalls from the coconut levy fund and United Coconut Planters Bank. Another 27% was placed under the name of the Coconut Industry Investment Fund Oil Mills Group (CIIF), funded through the coco levy. In 1986, all of these assets were sequestered by the Presidential Commission on Good Government after the Marcos Administration had been ousted. In April 2011, the Philippines' Supreme court affirmed Cojuangco to be the owner of the 20% shares in SMC (reduced to about 17% by then because of SMC's expansion since 1983) which he had purchased through the loan from UCPB.

In September 2012, the Supreme court affirmed that the 27% block of San Miguel Corporation shares under the name of the CIIF - reduced to 24% because of SMC's expansion since 1983 - were government-owned. The court also ruled that the funds from these shares could only be used by government for the benefit of the coconut farmers. Later that year, San Miguel Corporation bought back the government's stake for P57.6 billion, ending a 26-year period in which the Philippine government was a major voting block in the corporation.

In November of the same year, the court ruled that a 72.2% stake in UCPB was owned by the state, because they were bought using coco levy funds. This included a 7.22% stake registered under Cojuangco, which he claimed had been his compensation for brokering the bank's purchase in 1975, and the sale of the remaining 64.98% stake in UCPB to the Philippine Coconut Authority (PCA).

== Political roles after 1986 ==
When Ferdinand Marcos was ousted by the People Power revolution in February 1986, Cojuangco was flown out of the country and into exile along with the Marcos family and Fabian Ver, departing in the early morning of February 25, 1986. Cojuangco was allowed to return in 1989, having spent most of his exile breeding and racing horses in Australia.

In 1992, Cojuangco founded the Nationalist People's Coalition to serve as his vehicle to further his aspirations in the 1992 presidential elections. He was a candidate for the Philippine presidency in 1992, ultimately losing in a tight election to Fidel V. Ramos. Ramos received 23.6% of the vote. Miriam Defensor Santiago came in second with 19.7% and Cojuangco came in third with 18.2%.

He further tested the political waters in 2003, intending to run in the 2004 presidential election, but soon withdrew. He eventually became chairman emeritus of the NPC, wielding influence that earned him a reputation as a "kingmaker" in Philippine politics.

== Involvement in sports ==
Cojuangco advocated for sports in the country, notably basketball, having supported it since the 1980s as a basketball godfather with his Northern Consolidated team. Through San Miguel Corporation, he was able to own three teams in the Philippine Basketball Association: the flagship San Miguel Beermen, Barangay Ginebra San Miguel, and Magnolia Hotshots. He was also a key benefactor of the De La Salle Green Archers men's basketball team.

He also served as the founding chairman of the horse racing body Philippine Racing Commission from 1975 to 1978.

== Personal life ==
Cojuangco was the eldest child of Eduardo C. Cojuangco Sr. and Josephine B. Murphy. His mother, the daughter of an Irish-Canadian U.S. Army volunteer who married a Filipina woman, was born and raised in Baguio. His father, Eduardo Sr., the son of Melecio Cojuangco, was of Chinese descent.

He was married to Soledad "Gretchen" Oppen of Negros Occidental. They had four children: Marcos "Mark" Cojuangco, Carlos "Charlie" Cojuangco, Luisa "Lisa" Cojuangco-Cruz, and Margarita "Tina" Cojuangco Barrera. Although later separated, the couple remained legally married even after The Philippine Star reported in March 2018 that Cojuangco was living with 1996 Binibining Pilipinas Universe winner Aileen Damiles and their two daughters.

== Death ==
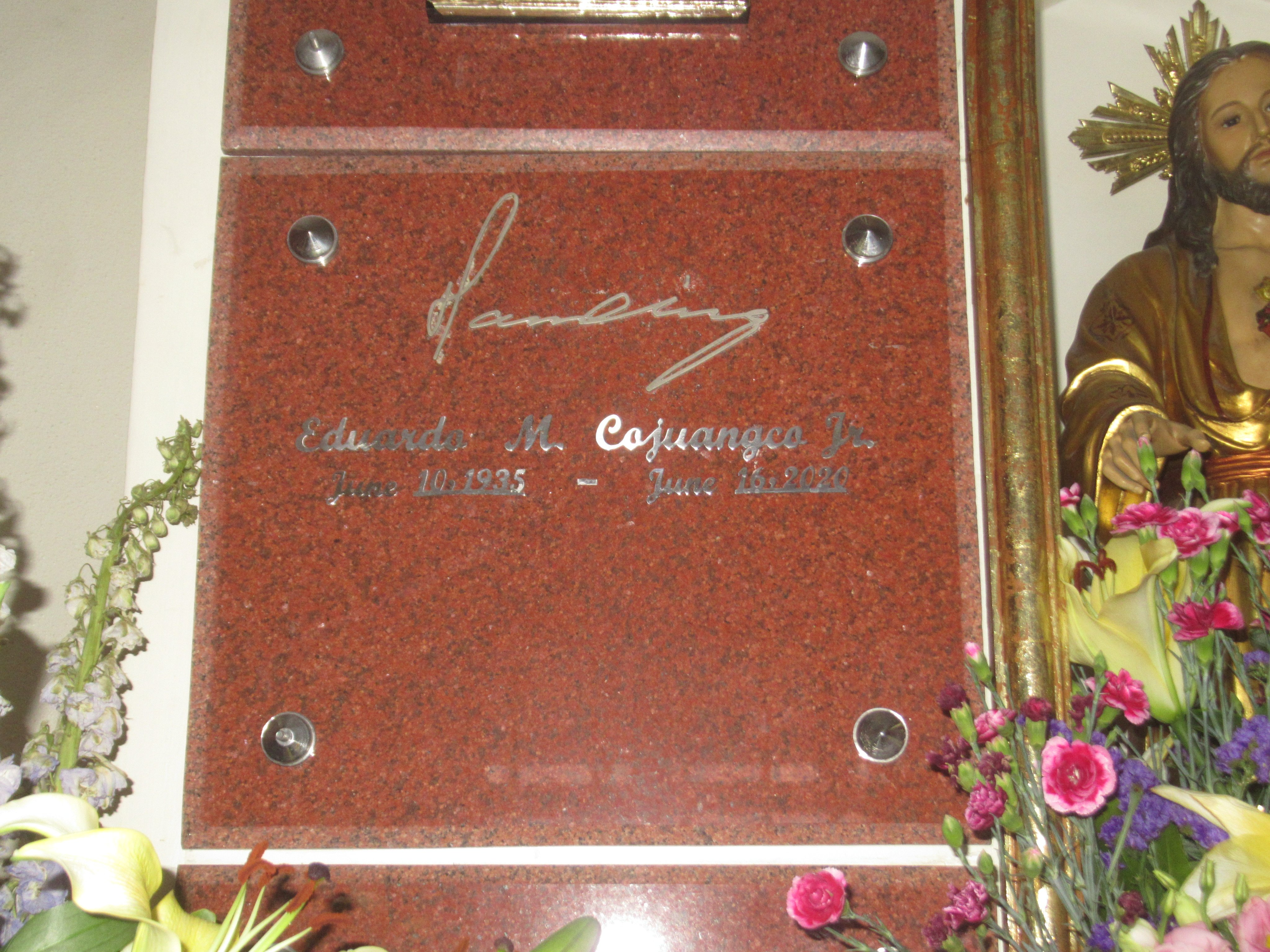
Cojuangco's grave at the Mount Carmel Shrine columbarium in Quezon City

Cojuangco died on June 16, 2020, of heart failure and pneumonia at the St. Luke's Medical Center – Global City, six days after his 85th birthday.

== Legacy ==
On April 29, 2022, then President Rodrigo Duterte signed Republic Act No. 11729, declaring every 10 June each year a public special holiday in the province of Tarlac as Danding Cojuangco Day.

In March 2024, the Urdaneta City Bypass Road in Pangasinan was renamed as the Ambassador Eduardo 'Danding' M. Cojuangco Jr. Avenue by virtue of Republic Act No. 11988 signed by President Bongbong Marcos.

On May 10, 2024, Filoil EcoOil Sports announced that the 2024 Filoil EcoOil Preseason Cup would be named after him.
