= 2025 Tarlac local elections =

- May 12, 2025
- Gubernatorial election
- Registered: 936,003
- Turnout: 753,492 (80.50%)
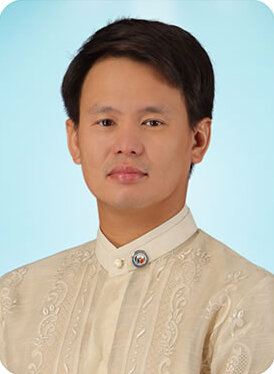
		PFP
Candidate	Christian Yap	Max Roxas
Party	SST	PFP
Running mate	Lita Aquino	Marcelino Aganon
Popular vote	481,696	256,496
Percentage	51.46	27.40
Governor before election
Susan Yap
NPC
Elected Governor
Christian Yap
NPC
- Vice gubernatorial election
- Registered: 936,003
- Turnout: 665,138 (71.06%)
	NPC	PFP
Candidate	Lita Aquino	Marcelino Aganon
Party	NPC	PFP
Popular vote	348,270	297,360
Percentage	37.27	31.77
Vice Governor before election
Casada David
NPC
Elected Vice Governor
Lita Aquino
NPC

Local elections were held in Tarlac on May 12, 2025, as part of the 2025 Philippine general election. Registered and valid voters from Tarlac shall elect all local positions: a governor, vice governor, municipal/city mayor, municipal/city vice mayor, municipal/city councilors, as well as members of the Sangguniang Panlalawigan where 10 out of 13 member shall be elected.

== Background ==
Incumbent Susan Yap, who was elected during the 2016 national and local elections, is ineligible to serve another term. She is the first woman to take office as the third governor in the Yap political family and the second female administrator in Tarlac's history. Replacing her is her son, Christian Yap, former mayor of Victoria, and former representative of the 2nd Congressional District. Facing him are his PFP gubernatorial nominee and incumbent Paniqui Tarlac mayor Max Roxas and independent candidates Kathryn Ann Basco, Fredo Bie, and Mark Joseph Garcia.

All single-winner posts up for election use first-past-the-post voting, and all multiple-winner posts use plurality block voting. The following is a list of the posts up for election, including the number of available seats for each:

Localities in the Province of Tarlac
Congressional District	Locality	Mayor	Vice Mayor	Locality Council	Representative	Governor	Vice Governor	Provincial Board
1st District	Anao	1	1	8	1	1	1	3
1st District	Camiling	1	1	8	1	1	1	3
1st District	Mayantoc	1	1	8	1	1	1	3
1st District	Moncada	1	1	8	1	1	1	3
1st District	Paniqui	1	1	8	1	1	1	3
1st District	Pura	1	1	8	1	1	1	3
1st District	Ramos	1	1	8	1	1	1	3
1st District	San Clemente	1	1	8	1	1	1	3
1st District	San Manuel	1	1	8	1	1	1	3
1st District	Santa Ignacia	1	1	8	1	1	1	3
2nd District	Gerona	1	1	8	1	1	1	3
2nd District	San Jose	1	1	8	1	1	1	3
2nd District	Victoria	1	1	8	1	1	1	3
2nd District	Tarlac City	1	1	10	1	1	1	3
3rd District	Bamban	1	1	8	1	1	1	3
3rd District	Capas	1	1	8	1	1	1	3
3rd District	Concepcion	1	1	8	1	1	1	3
3rd District	La Paz	1	1	8	1	1	1	3

== Gubernatorial Election ==
Term-limited incumbent Susan Yap (Nationalist People's Coalition) is running for mayor of Tarlac City. Yap was re-elected unopposed in 2022. Replacing her position is former Victoria mayor and former 2nd district representative Christian Yap. He will be challenged by PFP's nominee, Max Roxas, and independent candidates Kathryn Ann Basco, Mark Joseph Garcai and Fredo Bie.

=== Election Results ===
Candidate	Party	Votes	% (Valid)	% (Registered)
Christian Yap	Sama-Sama Tarlac	481,696	63.71%	51.46%
Max Roxas	Partido Federal ng Pilipinas	256,496	33.93%	27.40%
Kathryn Ann Basco	Independent	8,812	1.17%	0.94%
Mark Joseph Garcia	Independent	7,248	0.96%	0.77%
Fredo Bia	Independent	1,777	0.24%	0.19%
Total valid votes		756,029	100.00%	80.77%
Total turnout		665,138	—	71.06%
Registered voters		936,003	—	100.00%

== Vice Gubernatorial Election ==
Term-limited incumbent Casada David (Nationalist People's Coalition) is running for the Tarlac Provincial Board in the 3rd provincial district. David was re-elected with 72.19% of the vote in 2022. Running for the position are Estelita Aquino of the Nationalist People's Coalition, Marcelino Aganon of the PFP and Edwardo "Dual" Estabillo, an independent candidate.

=== Election Results ===
Candidate	Party	Votes	%
Estelita Aquino	Nationalist People's Coalition	348,870	52.45%
Marcelino Aganon	Partido Federal ng Pilipinas	297,360	44.71%
Edwardo Estabillo	Independent	18,908	2.84%
TOTAL VALID VOTES		665,138	100.00%
TURNOUT		665,138	71.06%
REGISTERED VOTERS		936,003	100.00%

== Provincial Board ==
The Tarlac Provincial Board is composed of 13 board members, 10 of whom are elected.

=== Retiring and term-limited board members ===
The following board members are retiring:

- Dan Canlas Asiaten (Independent, 2nd provincial district), running for vice mayor of Tarlac City.
- Danilo David (Nationalist People's Coalition, 3rd provincial district)

The following board members are term-limited:

- Jessie Aquino (Nationalist People's Coalition, 1st provincial district)
- Romeo Evangelista (Nationalist People's Coalition, 1st provincial district)
- Vernon Villanueva (Nationalist People's Coalition, 3rd provincial district)

=== Overview ===
Party	Votes	%	Seats
Nationalist People's Coalition	1,084,759	63.04	7
Partido Federal ng Pilipinas	179,419	10.43	1
PROMDI	34,588	2.01	0
Independent	421,852	24.52	2
Ex officio seats			3
Total	1,720,618	100.00	13

=== 1st provincial district ===
Tarlac's 1st provincial district consists of the same area as Tarlac's 1st legislative district. Three board members are elected from this provincial district.

==== Candidates ====
The following candidates are included in the ballot:

No.	Candidate	Party
1	Win Corpuz	Partido Federal ng Pilipinas
2	Dagul Felix	Partido Federal ng Pilipinas
3	Joy Gilbert Lamorena (incumbent)	Nationalist People's Coalition
4	Pearl Erguiza Pacada	Nationalist People's Coalition
5	Jayrold Roxas	Partido Federal ng Pilipinas
6	Tito Roxas	Nationalist People's Coalition

==== Results ====
Candidate	Party	Votes	%
Pearl Erguiza Pacada	Nationalist People's Coalition	129,590	26.61
Joy Gilbert Lamorena (incumbent)	Nationalist People's Coalition	128,202	26.32
Tito Roxas	Nationalist People's Coalition	102,106	20.96
Jayrold Roxas	Partido Federal ng Pilipinas	68,383	14.04
Win Corpuz	Partido Federal ng Pilipinas	33,293	6.84
Dagul Felix	Partido Federal ng Pilipinas	25,497	5.23
Total		487,071	100.00

=== 2nd provincial district ===
Tarlac's 2nd provincial district consists of the same area as Tarlac's 2nd legislative district. Four board members are elected from this provincial district.

==== Candidates ====
The following candidates are included in the ballot:

No.	Candidate	Party
1	Gilbert Aquino	Independent
2	Topey delos Reyes (incumbent)	Independent
3	Ricky Diolazo	Nationalist People's Coalition
4	Dennis Go (incumbent)	Independent
5	Gab Hayashi	Independent
6	Vlad Rodriguez	Nationalist People's Coalition
7	Harmes Sembrano (incumbent)	Nationalist People's Coalition
8	Arron Villaflor	Partido Federal ng Pilipinas

==== Results ====
Candidate	Party	Votes	%
Harmes Sembrano (incumbent)	Nationalist People's Coalition	165,444	19.89
Dennis Go (incumbent)	Independent	156,875	18.86
Topey delos Reyes (incumbent)	Independent	138,922	16.70
Arron Villaflor	Partido Federal ng Pilipinas	119,412	14.36
Ricky Diolazo	Nationalist People's Coalition	113,674	13.67
Vlad Rodriguez	Nationalist People's Coalition	94,578	11.37
Gilbert Aquino	Independent	27,687	3.33
Gab Hayashi	Independent	15,182	1.83
Total		831,774	100.00

=== 3rd provincial district ===
Tarlac's 3rd provincial district consists of the same area as Tarlac's 3rd legislative district. Three board members are elected from this provincial district.

==== Candidates ====
The following candidates are included in the ballot:

No.	Candidate	Party
1	Lopi Alcala	Independent
2	Paul John Bernardo	Partido Federal ng Pilipinas
3	Sam Bulaga	Independent
4	Tootsie Cruz (incumbent)	Nationalist People's Coalition
5	Casada David	Nationalist People's Coalition
6	Hariking David	PROMDI
7	Jose Magbag	Independent
8	Boy Mandal	Independent
9	Ariel Mungcal	Partido Federal ng Pilipinas
10	Arlene Obor	Independent
11	Ton Villanueva	Nationalist People's Coalition

==== Results ====
Tarlac 3rd district provincial board elections
Party	Candidate	Votes	%
NPC	Tootsie Cruz	139,635	26.40
NPC	Casada David	107,340	20.29
NPC	Ton Villanueva	104,190	19.70
Independent	Boy Mandal	62,194	11.76
PFP	Ariel Mungcal	38,043	7.19
PROMDI	Hariking David	34,588	6.54
PFP	Paul John Bernardo	21,964	4.15
Independent	Lopi Alcala	6,577	1.24
Independent	Jose Magbag	6,442	1.22
Independent	Arlene Obor	4,428	0.84
Independent	Sam Bulaga	3,545	0.67
Total votes		528,946	100.00
NPC hold			

== Congressional Elections ==
=== 1st District ===
- Municipalities: Anao, Camiling, Mayantoc, Moncada, Paniqui, Pura, Ramos, San Clemente, San Manuel, and Santa Ignacia

Incumbent Jaime Cojuangco is running unopposed for this election.

Tarlac 1st district congressional elections
Party	Candidate	Votes	%
NPC	Jaime Cojuangco	182,032	100.0
Total votes		182,032	100.00
NPC hold			

=== 2nd District ===
- Municipalities: Gerona, San Jose, Victoria
- City: Tarlac City

Incumbent Christian Yap is running for governor. Running for the position is his uncle Victor Yap of Sama-Sama Tarlac and Cristy Angeles of PFP.

Tarlac 2nd district congressional elections
Party	Candidate	Votes	%
PFP	Cristy Angeles	167,125	53.82
SST	Victor Vy Yap	143,425	46.18
Total votes		310,550	100.00
PFP gain from SST			

=== 3rd District ===
- Municipalities: Bamban, Campas, Concepcion, and La Paz

Incumbent Bong Rivera is eligible for re-election. He will be challenged by Fernando David of PFP, and independent candidates Son Marimla and Steve Liwanag.

Tarlac 3rd district congressional elections
Party	Candidate	Votes	%
NPC	Bong Rivera	186,630	84.94
PFP	Fernando David	25,243	11.49
Independent	Son Marimla	4,232	1.93
Independent	Steve Maliwanag	3,614	1.64
Total votes		219,719	100.00
NPC hold			

== City and Municipal Elections ==
=== 1st District ===
- Municipalities: Anao, Camiling, Mayantoc, Moncada, Paniqui, Pura, Ramos, San Clemente, San Manuel, and Santa Ignacia

==== Political Parties of Elected Mayors and Vice Mayors and Votes - 1st District ====
Party	Total Votes	%
Nationalist People's Coalition	270,635	91.31%
Independent	13,188	4.45%
Kilusang Bagong Lipunan	8,257	2.79%
Partido Federal ng Pilipinas	4,331	1.46%
Overall Votes	296,411	100.00%

===== Anao =====
Incumbent Giann Piere "Jappy" De Dios is eligible for re-election. He was first elected in 2022 under NPC. Challenging him is Johanna Apuan-Caymo of PFP.

Anao mayoral elections
Party	Candidate	Votes	%
NPC	Jappy De Dios	3,939	53.08
PFP	Johanna Apuan-Caymo	3,482	46.92
Total votes		7,421	100.00
NPC hold			

Incumbent Joy Concepcion-Punzalan is running for re-election. She will be facing Ching Almazan of PFP.

Anao vice mayoral elections
Party	Candidate	Votes	%
PFP	Ching Almazan	4,331	59.77
NPC	Joy Concepcion-Punzalan	2,915	40.23
Total votes		7,246	100.00
PFP gain from NPC			

===== Camiling =====
Incumbent Erlon Agustin is term-limited and was first elected in 2016, her party nominated his wife, Joyce Agustin.

Camiling mayoral elections
Party	Candidate	Votes	%
NPC	Ate Joyce Agustin	24,391	53.68
PFP	Noel Dela Cruz	19,837	43.66
Independent	Benicio Delos Reyes II	1,212	2.67
Total votes		45,440	100.00
NPC hold			

Incumbent Noel Dela Cruz is running for mayor.

Camiling vice mayoral elections
Party	Candidate	Votes	%
NPC	Gladys Tan Agustin-Resurreccion	31,369	73.17
PDP–Laban	Atty. Marty Toralba	10,431	24.33
Independent	Art Lorenzana	1,070	2.50
Total votes		42,870	100.00
NPC gain from PFP			

===== Mayantoc =====
Incumbent Iluminado Pobre Jr is running for re-election.

Mayantoc mayoral elections
Party	Candidate	Votes	%
NPC	Iluminado Pobre Jr	13,862	76.55
PFP	Francisco Mamerga	4,246	23.45
Total votes		18,108	100.00
NPC hold			

Incumbent Venus Tomas is running for re-election.

Mayantoc vice mayoral elections
Party	Candidate	Votes	%
NPC	Venus Tomas	11,400	63.53
PFP	Ollot Pobre	6,545	36.47
Total votes		17,945	100.00
NPC hold			

===== Moncada =====
Incumbent Estelita Aquino is term-limited and will run for vice governor. Her son, appointed Vice Mayor RB Aquino, is running to succeed her. Challenging him are Normandy Pamintuan of the PFP, who was also his mother's opponent in the 2022 election, and Connie Facun of PDP-Laban.

Moncada mayoral elections
Party	Candidate	Votes	%
NPC	Ramon "RB" Aquino	19,995	59.08
PFP	Normandy Pamintuan	11,684	34.52
PDP–Laban	Connie Facun	2,166	6.40
Total votes		33,845	100.00
NPC hold			

Incumbent Jaime “Jiggs” Duque, elected in 2022 during his final term, died in office on November 8, 2022. Ramon "RB" Aquino, the highest-voted councilor in the 2022 elections, was appointed as vice mayor. However, with Ramon now running for mayor, his cousin, incumbent board member Jessie Aquino, is running for vice mayor instead.

Moncada vice mayoral election
Party	Candidate	Votes	%
NPC	Jessie Aquino	20,272	63.85
PFP	Vicky Alcantara	6,449	20.31
PDP–Laban	Oppong Obillo	5,027	15.83
Total votes		31,748	100.00
NPC hold			

===== Paniqui =====
Incumbent Mayor Max Roxas is running for governor. His daughter, incumbent Vice Mayor Bien Roxas, will run for his mayoral seat. Challenging her under the NPC banner is Kat Roxas, a relative of theirs. Bien will run under the PFP, despite her father having previously been a member of the NPC during the 2022 mayoral election.

Paniqui mayoral election
Party	Candidate	Votes	%
NPC	Kat Roxas	35,126	63.54
PFP	Bien Roxas	20,158	36.46
Total votes		55,284	100.00
NPC hold			

Incumbent Vice Mayor Bien Roxas is running for mayor, with her brother Ian Roxas as their party's nominee for vice mayor. Challenging Ian for the position is Jake Roxas, a first cousin of Kat Roxas.

Paniqui vice mayoral election
Party	Candidate	Votes	%
NPC	Jake Roxas	36,862	69.14
PFP	Ian Roxas	16,453	30.86
Total votes		53,315	100.00
NPC hold			

===== Pura =====
Incumbent Mayor Freddie Domingo died in office in January 2024. Following his death, elected Vice Mayor Atty. Epoy Balmores was appointed as mayor.

Pura mayoral election
Party	Candidate	Votes	%
NPC	Atty. Epoy Balmores	8,205	51.71
KBL	Jonar Tabaquin	5,162	32.53
PFP	Ben Idmilao	2,501	15.76
Total votes		15,868	100.00
NPC gain from PROMDI			

Atty. Epoy Balmores is running for his first full term as mayor, with Pau Pascua running as his party's vice mayoral candidate.

Pura vice mayoral election
Party	Candidate	Votes	%
KBL	Doctora Zarate	8,257	54.78
NPC	Pau Pascua	6,816	45.22
Total votes		15,073	100.00
KBL gain from PDP–Laban			

===== Ramos =====
Incumbent Celso Banag is seeking re-election under the Nationalist People's Coalition (NPC). He previously ran under the Kilusang Bagong Lipunan (KBL) in the 2022 elections.

Ramos mayoral election
Party	Candidate	Votes	%
NPC	Celso Banag	7,949	56.28
PFP	Roland Gaudia	6,174	43.72
Total votes		14,123	100.00
NPC gain from KBL			

Incumbent Dado Reginaldo is not running for re-election, with Gbong Suñiga nominated by the party to run for his seat.

Ramos vice mayoral election
Party	Candidate	Votes	%
NPC	Gbong Suñiga	7,043	50.70
PFP	Manolo Gallarde Jr.	6,848	49.30
Total votes		13,891	100.00
NPC hold			

===== San Clemente =====
Incumbent Mayor Elma Macadamia and Vice Mayor Roseller Toledo will swap positions for this election. Both candidates ran unopposed in the 2022 elections.

San Clemente mayoral election
Party	Candidate	Votes	%
NPC	Roseller Toledo	5,032	58.65
Independent	Jim Gonzales	2,010	23.43
PFP	Isaias Apostol	1,537	17.92
Total votes		8,579	100.00
NPC hold			

Incumbent Mayor Elma Macadamia will run for vice mayor, swapping seats with Vice Mayor Roseller Toledo. Both Macadamia and Toledo ran unopposed in the 2022 elections.

San Clemente vice mayoral election
Party	Candidate	Votes	%
NPC	Elma Macadamia	5,622	67.23
PFP	Caloy Bruno	1,544	18.46
Independent	Dina Randolph	1,196	14.30
Total votes		8,362	100.00
NPC hold			

===== San Manuel =====
Incumbent Donya Tesoro is eligible for re-election

San Manuel mayoral election
Party	Candidate	Votes	%
NPC	Donya Tesoro	11,103	72.63
PFP	Jeff Malazo	4,021	26.30
Independent	Ruben Rillera	163	1.07
Total votes		15,287	100.00
NPC hold			

Incumbent Benjamin Tesoro is eligible for re-election.

San Manuel vice mayoral election
Party	Candidate	Votes	%
NPC	Sir Benjamin Tesoro	11,665	81.02
PFP	Pedring Talbo	2,732	18.98
Total votes		14,397	100.00
NPC hold			

===== Santa Ignacia =====
With incumbent Mayor Nora Tanjuakio Modomo barred from seeking re-election due to term limits, Vice Mayor Bong Leal Tan is running for the top local post under NPC. Challenging him is Vanessa Singson of PFP and independent candidates Roberto Lucas and Mariano Andres.

Santa Ignacia mayoral election
Party	Candidate	Votes	%
NPC	Bong Leal Tan	17,140	58.66
PFP	Vanessa Singson	12,008	41.10
Independent	Roberto Lucas	45	0.15
Independent	Mariano Andres	25	0.09
Total votes		29,218	100.00
NPC hold			

Incumbent Vice Mayor Bong Leal Tan is seeking the mayoralty under the NPC banner, with former municipal councilor Freddie Bagay running as his vice mayoral running mate.

Santa Ignacia vice mayoral election
Party	Candidate	Votes	%
Independent	Ponce Candelario	13,188	46.45
NPC	Freddie Bagay	8,350	29.41
PFP	Dennis Barrantes	6,855	24.14
Total votes		28,393	100.00
Independent gain from NPC			

=== 2nd District ===
- Municipalities: Gerona, San Jose, Victoria
- City: Tarlac City

==== Political Parties of Elected Mayors and Vice Mayors and Votes - 2nd District ====
Party	Total Votes	%
Nationalist People's Coalition	242,916	65.82%
Partido Federal ng Pilipinas	126,145	34.18%
Overall Votes	369,061	100.00%

===== Tarlac City =====
Incumbent Mayor Cristy Angeles is term-limited and is running for representative of Tarlac's 2nd congressional district. Her husband, Vic Angeles, is the Partido Federal ng Pilipinas (PFP) nominee for mayor. Challenging him are outgoing governor Susan Yap-Sulit (NPC) and independent candidate Poyeh Cuaresma.

Tarlac City mayoral election
Party	Candidate	Votes	%
NPC	Susan Yap	101,067	50.71
PFP	Vic Angeles	97,531	48.94
Independent	Poyeh Cuaresma	697	0.35
Total votes		199,295	100.00
NPC hold			

Incumbent Genaro Mendoza is term-limited. Incumbent councilor KT Angeles, daughter of Vic and Cristy Angeles, is running under Partido Federal ng Pilipinas (PFP) to succeed him, while Ace Manalang serves as the Nationalist People's Coalition (NPC) nominee.

Tarlac City vice mayoral election
Party	Candidate	Votes	%
PFP	KT Angeles	126,145	64.32
NPC	Ace Manalang	47,791	24.37
Independent	Dan Canlas Asiaten	21,455	10.94
Independent	Willy Bog's Abayari	722	0.37
Total votes		196,113	100.00
PFP gain from NPC			

Ten councilors are elected at-large via plurality-at-large voting to serve in the Sangguniang Panlungsod.

City of Tarlac Sangguniang Panglungsod election
Party	Candidate	Votes	%
PFP	Jojo Briones	93,384	6.00
PFP	Genise Delos Reyes	90,119	5.79
NPC	Pee Jay Basangan	89,664	5.76
PFP	Henry De Leon	88,825	5.70
PFP	Cesar Go	88,607	5.69
PFP	Weng Quiroz	88,525	5.68
NPC	Jerome Lapeña	85,070	5.46
NPC	Emy Ladera	79,452	5.10
NPC	Joji David	78,347	5.03
NPC	Anne Belmonte	77,745	4.99
PFP	Tonton Torres	74,137	4.76
NPC	Aro Mendoza	69,005	4.43
PFP	Edgar Sumat	59,989	3.85
PFP	Glenn Tibo Caritativo	59,513	3.82
NPC	Ato Chua	57,700	3.70
PFP	Brother Louie Juico	54,355	3.49
NPC	Justine Vlad Rodriguez	52,498	3.37
NPC	Tonyboy Cervantes	52,095	3.34
PFP	Richard Ocampo Espinosa	51,315	3.30
Independent	Mr G Mendoza	15,680	1.01
Independent	Thom Patawaran	14,834	0.95
Independent	Bal Manalang	13,442	0.86
Independent	Henry Garcia	9,981	0.64
Independent	Bong Suba	9,679	0.62
Independent	Tey Teofilo	8,285	0.53
Independent	Rudy De Guzman	7,369	0.47
Independent	Rommel Co	5,063	0.32
Independent	Bap Edwin Perez	4,960	0.32
Independent	Ador Vitug	4,856	0.31
Total votes		1,557,208	100.00

===== Gerona =====
Incumbent Engr. Eloy Eclar is term-limited and will run for vice mayor. May Eclar, his wife, is his party's nominee.

Gerona mayoral election
Party	Candidate	Votes	%
NPC	May Eclar	30,836	57.45
PFP	Nonoy Go	22,842	42.55
Total votes		53,678	100.00
NPC hold			

Incumbent Nonoy Go will not seek for re-election.

Gerona vice mayoral election
Party	Candidate	Votes	%
NPC	Eloy Eclar	39,858	75.16
PFP	Attorney Manny Gragasin	13,170	24.84
Total votes		53,028	100.00
NPC gain from KBL			

===== San Jose =====
Incumbent Romeo Capitulo is eligible for re-election.

San Jose mayoral election
Party	Candidate	Votes	%
NPC	Romeo Capitulo	10,219	50.52
Independent	Turbo Dupitas	6,738	33.31
PFP	Bayani Facun	3,221	15.92
Independent	Joker Labador	49	0.24
Total votes		20,227	100.00
NPC hold			

Incumbent Riza Joaquin is eligible for re-election.

San Jose vice mayoral election
Party	Candidate	Votes	%
NPC	Riza Eugenio-Joaquin	16,541	93.89
Independent	Sendo Galang	1,076	6.11
Total votes		17,617	100.00
NPC hold			

===== Victoria =====
Incumbent Rex Villa Agustin is eligible for re-election.

Victoria mayoral election
Party	Candidate	Votes	%
NPC	Rex Villa Agustin	19,255	55.14
Independent	Marvin Silao	14,767	42.29
Independent	Reino Gutierrez	1,896	5.43
Total votes		35,918	100.00
NPC hold			

Incumbent Tani Guiam will run unopposed for the second time since the 2022 elections.

Victoria vice mayoral election
Party	Candidate	Votes	%
NPC	Tani Guiam	25,940	100.00
Total votes		25,940	100.00
NPC hold			

=== 3rd District ===
- Municipalities: Bamban, Capas, Concepcion, and La Paz

==== Political Parties of Elected Mayors and Vice Mayors and Votes - 3rd District ====
Party	Total Votes	%
Nationalist People's Coalition	171,475	57.25%
Independent	101,007	33.72%
People's Reform Party	27,022	9.02%
Overall Votes	299,504	100.00%

===== Bamban =====
Incumbent Alice Guo was dismissed from office by the Ombudsman in August 2024 and perpetually disqualified from holding public office due to her involvement in illegal POGO operations. Following her dismissal, her 2022 opponent and former Anupul barangay captain Jose "Joey" Salting Jr. successfully secured the mayoralty as the Nationalist People's Coalition (NPC) nominee in the 2025 elections.

Bamban mayoral election
Party	Candidate	Votes	%
NPC	Joey Salting	23,920	60.82
Independent	Jon Feliciano	11,234	28.56
PFP	Erdy Timbang	3,571	9.08
PDP	Bryan Eribal	307	0.78
KBL	Rody Escoto	301	0.77
Total votes		39,333	100.00
NPC gain from Independent			

Incumbent Ding Anunciacion is eligible for re-election.

Bamban vice mayoral election
Party	Candidate	Votes	%
Independent	Ding Anunciacion	17,372	46.13
NPC	Jajie Sales	17,216	45.72
PFP	Joseph Gomez	2,594	6.89
KBL	Rey Garcia	473	1.26
Total votes		37,655	100.00
Independent hold			

===== Capas =====
Incumbent Mayor Roseller "Boots" Rodriguez successfully secured re-election for Mayor of Capas, while incumbent Vice Mayor Alex Espinosa retained his seat in the vice mayoral race. Though both officials previously ran under Partido Demokratiko Pilipino (PDP-Laban) in 2022, they opted to run as Independent candidates in 2025. Rodriguez defeated former mayor Reynaldo "Reycat" Catacutan alongside independent candidates Marjorie Joy Movilla and Moises Maringcao.

Capas mayoral election
Party	Candidate	Votes	%
Independent	Boots Rodriguez	47,674	63.33
Independent	Reycat Catacutan	26,670	35.43
Independent	Marjorie Joy Movilla	772	1.02
Independent	Moises Maringcao	164	0.22
Total votes		75,280	100.00
Independent gain from PDP			

Meanwhile, Espinosa prevailed over independent bet Jeff Ticsay and PROMDI candidate Nicolas Pineda.

Capas vice mayoral election
Party	Candidate	Votes	%
Independent	Alex Espinosa	35,961	49.53
Independent	Jeff Ticsay	24,924	34.33
PROMDI	Nicolas Pineda	11,644	16.04
Independent	Melchor Ramos	697	0.96
Independent	Wenvie Torres	374	0.52
Total votes		73,600	100.00
Independent gain from PDP			

===== Concepcion =====
Incumbent Mayor Noel Villanueva (NPC) secured re-election to retain the mayoralty for the Nationalist People's Coalition, defeating former mayor Andres "Andy" Lacson of the Partido Federal ng Pilipinas (PFP).

Concepcion mayoral election
Party	Candidate	Votes	%
NPC	Noel Villanueva	55,203	56.07
PFP	Andy Lacson	43,257	43.93
Total votes		98,460	100.00
NPC hold			

In the vice mayoral race, NPC nominee Evelyn Rivera won against outgoing vice mayor Carla Bautista (PFP), flipping the post to the NPC after Bautista previously captured the seat in 2022 under Aksyon Demokratiko.

Concepcion vice mayoral election
Party	Candidate	Votes	%
NPC	Evelyn Rivera	64,510	67.25
PFP	Carla Bautista	31,418	32.75
Total votes		95,928	100.00
NPC gain from Aksyon			

===== La Paz =====
Incumbent Venus Jordan of the People's Reform Party (PRP) successfully retained her seat for a second term, securing 27,022 votes (68.00%) over Partido Federal ng Pilipinas (PFP) candidate Bong Manuel, who garnered 12,719 votes (32.00%).

La Paz mayoral election
Party	Candidate	Votes	%
PRP	Venus Jordan	27,022	68.00
PFP	Bong Manuel	12,719	32.00
Total votes		39,741	100.00
PRP hold			

Incumbent Lorna Manalo of the Nationalist People's Coalition (NPC) won re-election with a decisive victory, capturing 27,842 votes (74.29%) against independent candidate Migs Flores, who received 9,632 votes (25.71%).

La Paz vice mayoral election
Party	Candidate	Votes	%
NPC	Lorna Manalo	27,842	74.29
Independent	Migs Flores	9,632	25.71
Total votes		37,474	100.00
NPC hold			

=== Political Parties of Elected Mayors and Vice Mayors and Votes - Overall ===
Party	Total Votes	%
Nationalist People's Coalition	685,026	70.26%
Partido Federal ng Pilipinas	130,476	13.38%
Independent	114,195	11.71%
People's Reform Party	27,022	2.77%
Kilusang Bagong Lipunan	8,257	0.85%
Overall Votes	964,976	100.00%
