= Christian Yap =

Filipino politician (born 1985)

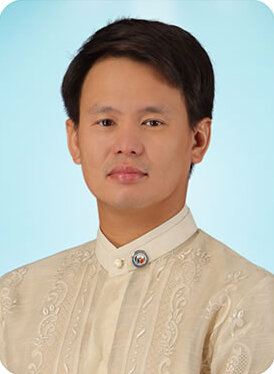
- Yap during the 19th Congress

33rd Governor of Tarlac
- Incumbent
- Assumed office June 30, 2025
- Vice Governor: Lita Aquino
- Preceded by: Susan Yap

Member of the Philippine House of Representatives from Tarlac's 2nd District
- In office June 30, 2022 – June 30, 2025
- Preceded by: Victor Yap
- Succeeded by: Cristy Angeles

Mayor of Victoria, Tarlac
- In office June 30, 2019 – June 30, 2022
- Vice Mayor: Rex Villa Agustin
- Preceded by: Marvin Silao
- Succeeded by: Rex Villa Agustin

Personal details
- Born: Christian Tell Areno Yap; April 29, 1985 (age 41) Quezon City, Philippines
- Party: NPC (2015–present); SST (local party; 2024–present)
- Spouse: Melissa Yeung
- Relations: Susan Yap (mother); Victor Yap (uncle); Jose Yap (grandfather)
- Children: 1
- Education: Ateneo de Manila University; Cardiff University
- Occupation: Politician

Christian Tell Areno Yap (born April 29, 1985) is a Filipino politician. He is currently serving as 33rd governor of Tarlac since 2025. He represented the 2nd district of Tarlac in the Philippine House of Representatives from 2022 to 2025. He served as mayor of Victoria, Tarlac from 2019 to 2022. Yap is a member of the Nationalist People's Coalition and the Sama Sama Tarlac.

== Early life and education ==
Yap was born on April 29, 1985, in Quezon City to a prominent political family in Tarlac. He is the eldest child of Susan Yap. He studied Ateneo de Manila University and Cardiff University for his college education.

== Political career ==
=== 2016 Victoria, Tarlac mayoral bid ===
Yap is ran for mayor of Victoria, Tarlac but he lost to Marvin Silao over 2,255 votes in 2016.

=== Mayor of Victoria, Tarlac (2019–2022) ===
In 2019, Yap ran again as mayor of Victoria, Tarlac but he won over Marvin Silao.

=== House of Representatives (2022–2025) ===
In 2022, Yap was represented the second district of Tarlac until 2025.

=== Governor of Tarlac (2025–present) ===
Yap was elected as governor of Tarlac in the 2025 elections after succeeded his mother Susan Yap.

== Personal life ==
Yap is married to Melissa Yeung and has one son. His mother, Susan Yap, is the current mayor of Tarlac City since 2025. His uncle Victor Yap, is a former representative from the 2nd district of Tarlac from 2016 to 2022 and also a governor of Tarlac from 2007 to 2016. His grandfather, Jose Yap, was also a representative and governor from Tarlac.

== Electoral history ==
Electoral history of Christian Yap
Year	Office	Party		Votes received				Result
Year	Office	Local	National	Total	%	P.	Swing	Result
2016	Mayor of Victoria, Tarlac	—N/a	NPC	12,310	—N/a	2nd	—N/a	Lost
2019	Mayor of Victoria, Tarlac	—N/a	NPC	24,252	—N/a	1st	—N/a	Won
2022	Representative (Tarlac–2nd)	—N/a	NPC	208,195	82.01%	1st	—N/a	Won
2025	Governor of Tarlac	SST	NPC	480,044	63.71%	1st	—N/a	Won
