= 2016 Tarlac City local elections =

2016 Tarlac City mayoral election
← 2013	May 9, 2016	2019 →
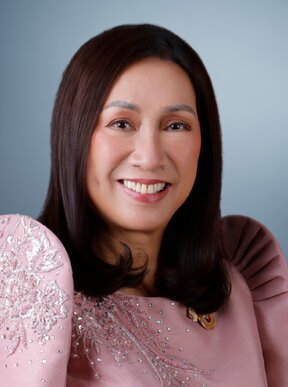
Candidate	Cristy Angeles	Allan Manalang
Party	NPC	Independent
Running mate	Anne Belmonte	Noel Soliman
Popular vote	81,886	62,845
Percentage	56.21	43.14
Mayor before election
Gelacio Manalang
PMP
Elected mayor
Cristy Angeles
NPC
- 2016 Tarlac City vice mayoral election
← 2013	May 9, 2016	2019 →
Candidate	Aro Mendoza	Anne Belmonte
Party	Independent	NPC
Popular vote	52,660	43,200
Percentage	36.84	30.22
Candidate	Ato Chua	Noel Soliman
Party	Independent	Independent
Popular vote	21,641	20,012
Percentage	15.14	14.00
Vice Mayor before election
Anne Belmonte
NPC
Elected Vice Mayor
Aro Mendoza
Independent

Tarlac City held its local elections on May 9, 2016 within the Philippine general election. The voters elected candidates for mayor, vice mayor, and ten councilors. Incumbent 2nd district board member Cristy Angeles became the first female mayor of Tarlac City after defeating Allan Manalang, son of incumbent Mayor Gelacio Manalang, who unsuccessfully ran for the governorship post.

In the vice mayoral race, incumbent Vice Mayor Anne Belmonte was defeated by former Mayor Aro Mendoza, who also endorsed Cristy Angeles for Mayor. Belmonte, as the highest-placing Councilor during the last elections, replaced then-Vice Mayor Mike Tañedo when the latter died in office last October 5, 2014.

== Candidates ==
Parties are as stated in their certificate of candidacies.

=== Team Angeles ===
Team Angeles (NPC–LP)
Name	Party
For mayor
Cristy Angeles	NPC
For vice mayor
Anne Belmonte	NPC
For councilor
Ana Aguas	Liberal
Abel Basangan	Liberal
Topey delos Reyes	Liberal
Ricky Diolazo	Liberal
Jelo Honrado	Liberal
Jerome Lapeña	NPC
Arsenio Lugay II	NPC
Weng Quiroz	NPC
Vlad Rodriguez	Liberal
Eddie Tañedo	NPC

=== Team Manalang ===
Team Manalang
Name	Party
For mayor
Allan Manalang	Independent
For vice mayor
Noel Soliman	Independent
For councilor
Jojo Briones	Independent
Alejandro Bucad	Independent
Meynard Buena	Independent
Glenn Troy Caritativo	Independent
Emy Cortez	Independent
Benjie Dayan	Independent
Frank Dayao	Independent
Lucia Tanedo	Independent

=== Others ===
Independents not in tickets
Name	Party
For mayor
Roger Tomaroy	Independent
For vice mayor
Ato Chua	Independent
Aro Mendoza	Independent
Pepe Rigor	Independent
Paul David Santos	Independent
For councilor
Edgar Aguas	Independent
Jerry Arceo	Independent
Babet Bello	Independent
Ares Cortez	Independent
Richard Espinosa	Independent
Nestor Gaerlan	Independent
Rem Galang	Independent
Cesar Go	Independent
Malou Malvar	Independent
Tony Nepomuceno	Independent
Lesly Tamangan	Independent
Ador Vitug	Independent

== Mayoralty and vice mayoral elections ==
The candidates for mayor and vice mayor with the highest number of votes wins the seat; they are voted separately, therefore, they may be of different parties when elected.

=== Mayor ===
Tarlac City mayoralty election
Party	Candidate	Votes	%
NPC	Cristy Angeles	81,886	56.21
Independent	Allan Manalang	62,845	43.14
Independent	Roger Tomaroy	945	0.65
Margin of victory		19,041	13.07
Valid ballots		145,676	93.29
Invalid or blank votes		10,478	6.71
Total votes		156,154	100.00
NPC gain from PMP			

=== Vice Mayor ===
Tarlac City vice mayoralty election
Party	Candidate	Votes	%
Independent	Aro Mendoza	52,660	36.84
NPC	Anne Belmonte	43,200	30.22
Independent	Ato Chua	21,641	15.14
Independent	Noel Soliman	20,012	14.00
Independent	Pepe Rigor	4,705	3.29
Independent	Paul David Santos	725	0.51
Margin of victory		9,460	6.62
Valid ballots		142,943	91.54
Invalid or blank votes		13,211	8.46
Total votes		156,154	100.00
Independent gain from NPC			

== City Council ==
Tarlac City, elected Sangguniang Panlungsod or city council members. A voter votes for up to ten candidates, then the ten candidates with the highest number of votes are elected. Election is via plurality-at-large voting. The total votes are the actual number of voters who voted, not the total votes of all candidates.

=== Results per candidate ===
Summary of the May 9, 2016 Tarlac City council election results
Rank	Candidate	Coalition	Party	Votes	%
1.	Jojo Briones	Team Manalang	Independent	81,164	51.98%
2.	Topey delos Reyes	Team Angeles/NPC-LP	Liberal	76,184	48.79%
3.	Ana Aguas	Team Angeles/NPC-LP	Liberal	68,395	43.80%
4.	Glenn Troy Caritativo	Team Manalang	Independent	66,672	42.70%
5.	Ricky Diolazo	Team Angeles/NPC-LP	Liberal	65,811	42.14%
6.	Abel Basangan	Team Angeles/NPC-LP	Liberal	65,452	41.92%
7.	Jerome Lapeña	Team Angeles/NPC-LP	NPC	63,384	40.59%
8.	Weng Quiroz	Team Angeles/NPC-LP	NPC	56,498	36.18%
9.	Cesar Go	Not affiliated	Independent	51,430	32.94%
10.	Vlad Rodriguez	Team Angeles/NPC-LP	Liberal	50,436	32.30%
11.	Franklin Dayao	Team Manalang	Independent	49,376	31.62%
12.	Emy Cortez	Team Manalang	Independent	48,526	31.08%
13.	Jelo Honrado	Team Angeles/NPC-LP	Liberal	42,994	27.53%
14.	Arsenio Lugay II	Team Angeles/NPC-LP	NPC	35,996	23.05%
15.	Eddie Tañedo	Team Angeles/NPC-LP	NPC	34,393	22.03%
16.	Benjie Dayan	Team Manalang	Independent	32,911	21.08%
17.	Lucia Tanedo	Team Manalang	Independent	29,240	18.73%
18.	Tony Nepomuceno	Not affiliated	Independent	23,166	14.84%
19.	Edgar Aguas	Not affiliated	Independent	22,173	14.20%
20.	Richard Espinosa	Not affiliated	Independent	15,231	9.75%
21.	Jerry Arceo	Not affiliated	Independent	13,313	8.53%
22.	Rem Galang	Not affiliated	Independent	13,084	8.38%
23.	Meynard Buena	Team Manalang	Independent	12,999	8.32%
24.	Alejandro Bucad	Team Manalang	Independent	10,093	6.46%
25.	Babet Bello	Not affiliated	Independent	9,226	5.91%
26.	Malou Malvar	Not affiliated	Independent	8,434	5.40%
27.	Ares Cortez	Not affiliated	Independent	7,241	4.64%
28.	Nestor Gaerlan	Not affiliated	Independent	4,689	3.00%
29.	Ador Vitug	Not affiliated	Independent	4,579	2.93%
30.	Lesly Tamangan	Not affiliated	Independent	2,737	1.75%
Total turnout				156,154	84.71%
Registered voters				184,321	100.00%
Note: A total of 30 candidates ran for councilor.			Source: GMA-COMELEC transparency server		

=== Results per coalition ===
Coalition	Total votes	%	Seats won	%
NPC-LP coalition / Team Angeles	559,543	52.50%	7	70%
Team Manalang	330,981	31.05%	2	20%
Independents not in coalitions	175,303	16.45%	1	10%
Totals	1,065,827	100%	10	100%

=== Results per party ===
Party	Mayoral candidate	Total votes		Total seats	
Party	Mayoral candidate	Total	%	Total	%
Liberal	Cristy Angeles	369,272	34.65%	5	41.5%
NPC	Cristy Angeles	190,271	17.85%	2	16.6%
Independent	various	506,284	47.50%	3	24.9%
Total valid votes cast		1,065,827	N/A		
Total turnout		156,154	84.71%		
Total partisan seats				10	83.3%
Seat for Association of Barangay Captains President				1	8.3%
Seat for Association of Sangguniang Kabataan chairmen President				1	8.3%
Total non-partisan seats				2	16.3%
Total seats				12	100.0%
