= 2013 Tarlac local elections =

2013 Tarlac gubernatorial elections

2013 Tarlac gubernatorial elections
- May 13, 2013
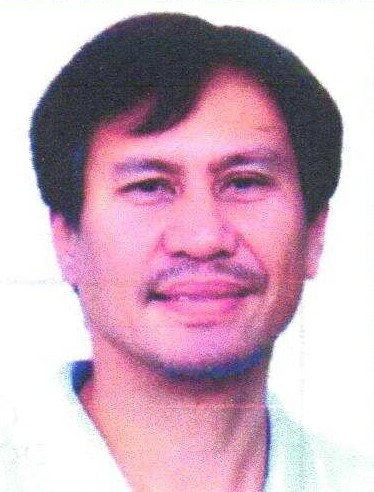
Candidate	Victor Yap	Isa Cojuangco-Suntay	Pearl Pacada
Party	NPC	Independent	Lakas–Kampi
Running mate	Enrique Cojuangco Jr.
Popular vote	264,728	101,168	53,465
Percentage	63.13	24.12	12.75
Governor before election
Victor Yap
NPC
Elected Governor
Victor Yap
NPC
- 2013 Tarlac vice gubernatorial elections
- May 13, 2013
Candidate	Enrique Cojuangco Jr.
Party	NPC
Popular vote	279,434
Percentage	100.00
Vice Governor before election
Pearl Pacada
Lakas–Kampi
Elected Vice Governor
Enrique Cojuangco Jr.
NPC

The province of Tarlac held local elections on Monday, May 13, 2013, as a part of the 2013 Philippine general election. Voters selected candidates for all local positions: a town mayor, vice mayor and town councilors, as well as members of the Sangguniang Panlalawigan, the vice-governor, governor and representatives for the three districts of Tarlac.

== Provincial elections ==
The candidates for governor and vice governor with the highest number of votes wins the seat; they are voted separately, therefore, they may be of different parties when elected.

=== Gubernatorial election ===
Total number of Voters who actually voted is 410,282

Parties are as stated in their certificate of candidacies.

Tarlac gubernatorial election
Party	Candidate	Votes	%
NPC	Victor Yap (incumbent)	264,728	63.13
Independent	Isa Cojuangco-Suntay	101,168	24.12
Lakas	Pearl Angeli Pacada	53,465	12.75
Total votes			100.00
NPC hold			

=== Vice-gubernatorial election ===
Enrique Cojuangco Jr. is running unopposed

Tarlac Vice-Gubernatorial election
Party	Candidate	Votes	%
NPC	Enrique Cojuangco Jr.	279,434	100.00
Total votes			100.00
NPC gain from Lakas			

== Congressional elections ==
Each of Tarlac's three legislative districts will elect each representative to the House of Representatives. The candidate with the highest number of votes wins the seat.

=== 1st District ===
Incumbent Enrique Cojuangco is running unopposed.

2013 Philippine House of Representatives election at Tarlac's 1st district
Party	Candidate	Votes	%
NPC	Enrique Cojuangco	112,506	69.08
Invalid or blank votes		50,365	30.92
Total votes		162,871	100.00
NPC hold			

=== 2nd District ===
Susan Sulit is the incumbent.

2013 Philippine House of Representatives election at Tarlac's 2nd district
Party	Candidate	Votes	%
NPC	Susan Yap-Sulit	121,341	68.04
Lakas	Josefino Rigor	34,750	19.48
Independent	Ernesto Calma	1,753	0.98
Margin of victory		86,591	48.55%
Invalid or blank votes		20,499	11.49
Total votes		178,343	100.00
NPC hold			

=== 3rd District ===
2013 Philippine House of Representatives election at Tarlac's 3rd district
Party	Candidate	Votes	%
Nacionalista	Noel Villanueva	65,465	53.73
NUP	Jeci Lapus	27,345	22.44
Liberal	Herminio Aquino	23,034	18.90
Margin of victory		38,120	31.28%
Invalid or blank votes		6,006	4.93
Total votes		121,850	100.00
Nacionalista gain from NUP			

== Provincial Board elections ==
All 3 Districts of Tarlac will elect Sangguniang Panlalawigan or provincial board members. Election is via plurality-at-large voting.

=== 1st District ===
Tarlac 1st District Sangguniang Panlalawigan election
Party	Candidate	Votes	%
NPC	Noel Dela Cruz	81,690	
NPC	Tito Razalan	47,256	
Lakas	Marcelino Aganon Jr.	47,256	
Independent	Joy Gilbert Lamorena	40,968	
NPC	Pablito Rosete	35,062	
PDP–Laban	Alvin Belarmino	28,701	
Lakas	Cleofe Favis	20,366	
Lakas	Miguel Gabriel	12,887	
PDP–Laban	Rey Roy	10,439	
Independent	Caloy Valenton	2,557	

=== 2nd District ===
Tarlac 2nd District Sangguniang Panlalawigan election
Party	Candidate	Votes	%
NPC	Cristy Angeles	119,265	
NPC	Harmes Sembrano	97,389	
PDP–Laban	Joji David	67,356	
Liberal	Henry de Leon	65,883	
Liberal	Tonyboy Cervantes	59,557	
Lakas	Baby Lugay	56,456	
Independent	Allan Villanueva	9,336	
Independent	Del Apachecha	4,094	

=== 3rd District ===
Tarlac 3rd District Sangguniang Panlalawigan election
Party	Candidate	Votes	%
Nacionalista	Henry Cruz	45,951	
NPC	Casada David	45,915	
NPC	Boy Mandal	35,346	
Independent	July Guevarra	34,403	
NUP	Henry Zablan	26,831	
Liberal	Jocas Castro	25,689	
NPC	Lito Figueroa	19,691	
NUP	Toto Ong	10,036	
NPC	Raul Narciso	4,129	
