= Tarlac Montessori School =

Private Montessori school in Tarlac, Philippines

Location
- La Puerta del Sol, Hi-Land Subd. Tarlac City; Philippines; 15°28′25.7″N 120°36′47.0″E

Information
- Former name: Little Angels Montessori School
- Type: Private school
- Motto: Educare Liberos Pro Vita (Latin) (Educating Children for Life)
- Religious affiliation: Catholic Church
- Established: 1987
- Founders: Dr. Elizabeth Teotico-Asiaten, Danilo Canlas Asiaten
- School district: Tarlac City Private Educational Institutions Association (TCPEIA)
- President: Danilo Canlas Asiaten
- Director: Dr. Elizabeth Teotico-Asiaten
- High School Principal: Dr. Steve Noel L. Dayao
- Gender: Co-education
- Campus type: Urban
- Colors: Green yellow white
- Newspaper: The Myriad (Secondary); The Magnifico (Elementary)
- Website: TMS.FB

Tarlac Montessori School (commonly referred to as TMS or Monté) is a private catholic school established in Tarlac City, Philippines in 1987. It is named after the physician and educator Maria Montessori.

Tarlac Montessori School offers co-educational kindergarten, elementary, junior high school, and senior high school programs, including a Special Science Class (SSC) for grades 1–12. Undergraduates follow a Catholic-rooted curriculum throughout their programs and hosts Wednesday Novenas and First Friday Mass in the mornings that they are scheduled.

The school was and still is run by its directress Dr. Elizabeth T. Asiaten and her husband, Tarlac Board Member Danilo Canlas Asiaten.

== History ==
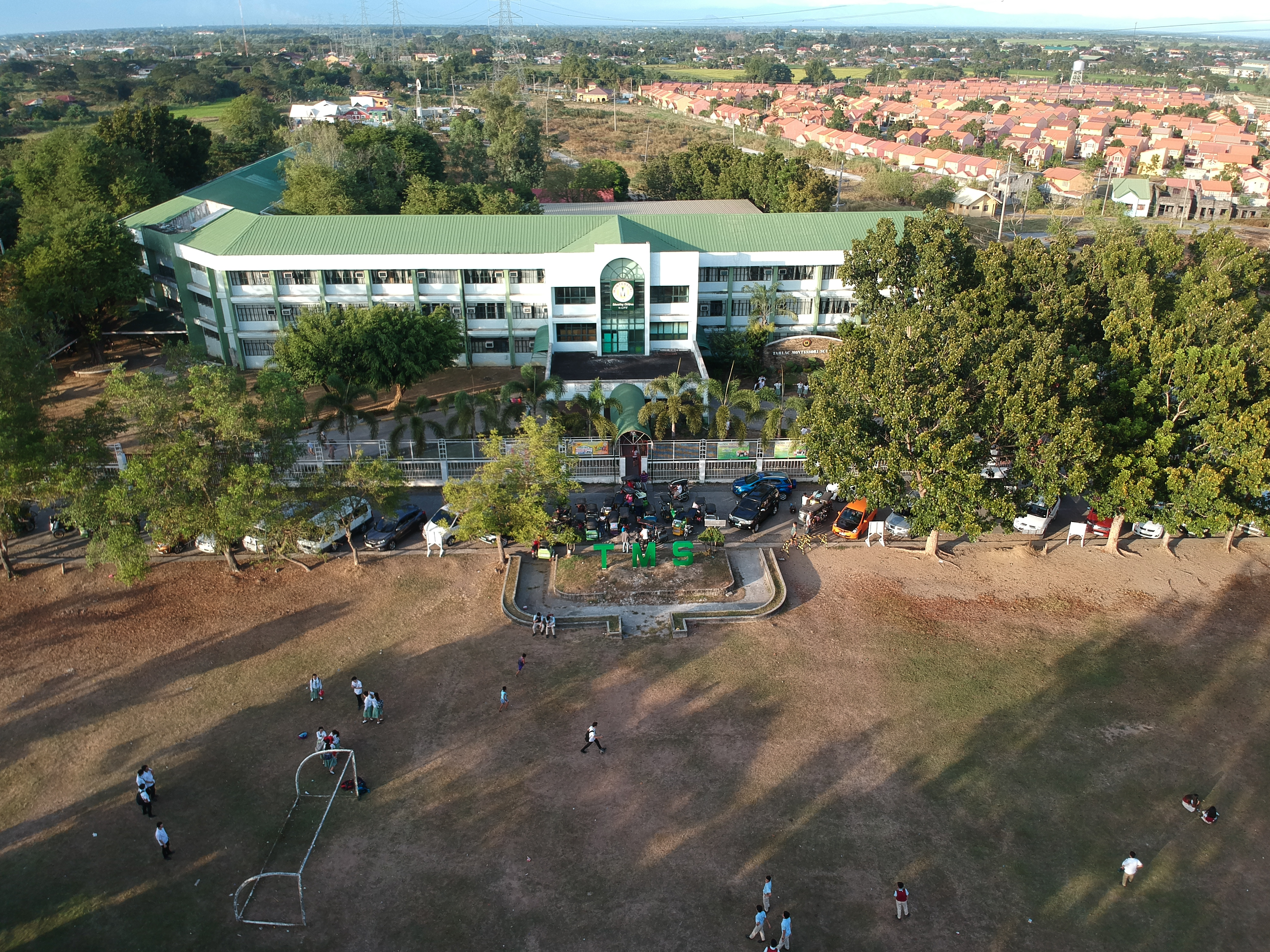
Tarlac Montessori School entrance, front parking slots, and soccer field

Tarlac Montessori School was established in 1987, at its first site at Masagana Building, F. Tañedo Street with its initial enrollees of 30 pupils in Nursery and Kindergarten. By 1989, the school transferred to M.H. del Pilar Street and added Grade One Level, holding its first Stepping Up Ceremonies in the same year.

In the following years, 1990-1992, San Sebastian extension building was added and expanded to accommodate the growing population of the school, along with an addition of grade 3 and 4, and received official government recognition for its pre-school program.

In 1993, TMS participated in the TAPSA Academic Literary and Musical Competitions for the first time, where the contestants secured positions.

Its first graduation ceremony was held in 1991. Through 1995-1998, a new school building in La Puerta Del Sol, Hi-Land Subdivision was commenced with its high-school inauguration in 1996.

The school was granted Government Recognition No. 05, s. 2011, in 2005, to offer the Special Science Curriculum (SSC) for the First Year students. In 2015, TMS was granted permission to offer SSC for Grade One. In 2016, the K to 12 Senior High School Grade 11 was implemented under the Government Permit SHSP No. 178, s. 2015. Additional classrooms on the right wing of the building were constructed.

TMS celebrated its 25th anniversary as an educational institution in 2012.

The school is currently applying for ISO 9001:2015 certification.

== Academics ==
=== Programs ===
Tarlac Montessori School offers programs at the kindergarten, elementary, and secondary levels. The secondary level comprises junior high school and senior high school. Its academic offerings include the Basic Education Curriculum (BEC) and the Special Science Curriculum (SSC) at the elementary and junior high school levels. An incoming Grade 1 student can take a test and be offered and SSES section. A person in the SSC must maintain a grade of 85 or higher for major subjects (English, Math, and Science) and a grade of 83 or higher for minor subjects. All incoming students also take the test again in Grade 7, including those previously in the curriculum in Grade 6 who wish to apply for the STE program.

TMS senior high school offers programs in the following fields:

- Accountancy
- Business and Management (ABM)
- Humanities and Social Sciences (HUMSS)
- Science, Technology, Engineering and Math (STEM)

== Student organizations ==
There are 13 accredited student organizations in Tarlac Montessori School. These are the Common Denominators' Guild (also referred to as the Math Club), Supreme Student Government (commonly abbreviated as SSG), Debate Society, TMS Music Ensemble, Art Jammers Guild, Eco-Warriors Club, The Myriad (the official publication of the institution for high school), The Magnifico (the official publication for grade school), Technology Club, the Tarlac Montessori School Scouting Movement, Campus Ministry, Drama Club, and the Athletic Association.
