= Killings of Diane Marie and John Ysmael Mollenido =

2026 double murder in the Philippines

- Date: January 2026
- Location: Quezon City, Bulacan, and Tarlac, Philippines
- Cause: Robbery and carnapping
- Deaths: 2 (Diane Marie Mollenido and John Ysmael Mollenido)

In January 2026, Diane Marie Mollenido, a police officer, and her eight-year-old son, John Ysmael Mollenido, were killed in the Philippines. Their bodies were discovered in separate locations in Bulacan and Tarlac days after they were reported missing. Authorities arrested three suspects, including a car agent and a dismissed police officer, in connection with the crime. The investigation indicated that the motive was related to the sale of the victims' vehicle.

== Background ==
Diane Marie Gabres Mollenido (aged 38) was a Police Senior Master Sergeant (PSMS) assigned to the National Capital Region Police Office (NCRPO) Personnel and Records Management Division. She entered the police service in July 2009. She lived in Taguig with her family. Her son, John Ysmael Gabres Mollenido, was eight years old.

On January 16, 2026, the mother and son left their home in Taguig. They traveled to Novaliches, Quezon City, to meet a car agent regarding the sale of their vehicle, a Toyota Innova. The car agent was Mollenido's goddaughter. The planned sale price for the vehicle was ₱450,000.

== Disappearance and discovery ==
The victims were last seen alive on January 16. When they failed to return home, Mollenido's husband, Police Senior Master Sergeant John Mollenido, reported them missing to the Taguig police on January 19.

=== Discovery of Diane Marie Mollenido ===
On January 24, 2026, the decomposing body of Diane Marie Mollenido was found in a creek along the Pulilan-Baliuag Bypass Road in Barangay Dulong Malabon, Pulilan, Bulacan. Her body was wrapped in cloth, a plastic sheet, and a garbage bag. She was identified by her family through her clothing and tattoos. An autopsy revealed she died from a gunshot wound to the head, specifically near the left ear.

=== Discovery of John Ysmael Mollenido ===
Five days later, on January 29, the body of eight-year-old John Ysmael was found in a calamansi farm in Barangay Maluid, Victoria, Tarlac. A resident discovered the body, which was wrapped in plastic tape and a garbage bag, in a grassy area. The farm was located approximately one kilometer from the national highway. The child's father positively identified the remains. The autopsy determined the cause of death was asphyxia by suffocation. His remains were cremated on January 31 in Tarlac.

== Investigation ==
The Philippine National Police (PNP) formed a special investigation task group to handle the case. Investigators identified the car agent, who was the last person seen with the victims, as a person of interest.

Police executed a search warrant at the car agent's home in Novaliches. A luminol test conducted at the residence revealed traces of blood in the bathroom, sink, and drainage, which samples were collected for DNA testing.

Authorities recovered Mollenido's Toyota Innova in Baguio. The vehicle had been sold to a buy-and-sell business. Additionally, police located a silver Toyota Fortuner in Angeles City, Pampanga. This SUV was allegedly used to transport the bodies of the victims to Bulacan and Tarlac.

The victim's husband, John Mollenido, was also considered a person of interest during the initial investigation and cooperated with authorities. He stated he understood the process due to past misunderstandings with his estranged wife. Following the arrests, police stated he would also face charges and undergo inquest proceedings.

== Arrests ==
On the evening of January 30, 2026, police arrested three suspects in separate operations in Quezon City. The suspects were identified as the female car agent, her husband (a dismissed police officer), and a male accomplice.

Reports identified the suspects as Pia Katrina Chua Panganiban (29), Christian Suarez Panganiban (44), and Gil Valdemoro Dy Jr. (41). Christian Panganiban was previously absent without official leave (AWOL) from the police force.

According to police sources, the suspects plotted to kill Mollenido to take her vehicle. Authorities stated the female suspect was at the scene where the policewoman was shot. The suspects allegedly suffocated the child using a plastic bag. Police recovered the victims' mobile phones and ₱100,000 in cash from the suspects.

One of the suspects led authorities to the location in Pulilan where the firearm used in the killing was allegedly discarded. Police used metal detectors and grass cutters to search the area.

== Reactions ==
PNP Chief General Jose Melencio Nartatez condemned the killings and ordered the NCRPO and Police Regional Office 3 to prioritize the resolution of the case. He assured the family of financial assistance and protection. Relatives and friends expressed their grief on social media, calling for justice for the mother and son.
