= 2013 Tarlac City local elections =

2013 Tarlac City mayoral election
- May 13, 2013
Candidate	Gelacio Manalang	Genaro Mendoza
Party	Lakas	Liberal
Running mate	Mike Tañedo	Ana Aguas
Popular vote	49,444	34,513
Percentage	43.25	30.19
Candidate	Jerome Lapeña	Danilo Asiaten
Party	Independent	Independent
Popular vote	20,013	10,111
Percentage	17.51	8.84
Mayor before election
Gelacio Manalang
Lakas
Elected mayor
Gelacio Manalang
Lakas
- 2013 Tarlac City vice mayoral election
- May 10, 2013
Candidate	Mike Tañedo	Ana Aguas
Party	Lakas–Kampi	Liberal
Popular vote	68,279	34,371
Percentage	66.52	33.48
Vice Mayor before election
Mike Tañedo
Lakas
Elected Vice Mayor
Mike Tañedo
Lakas

Tarlac City held local elections on May 13, 2013, within the Philippine general election. The voters elected candidates for mayor, vice mayor, and ten councilors. Incumbent mayor Gelacio Manalang won the elections, securing him to serve his second three-year term as the mayor of Tarlac City. Manalang defeated former mayor Genaro Mendoza, former city administrator and health officer Jerome Lapeña, and incumbent 2nd district provincial board member Danilo Asiaten.

Manalang's running mate, the incumbent vice mayor Mike Tañedo, topped the vice mayoral race, securing him to serve his second three-year term as the city's vice mayor. Tañedo defeated incumbent city councilor Ana Aguas by a wide margin. Affiliated with the Liberal Party during the previous election, Tañedo switched his party affiliation to Lakas-CMD during his second term.

In the city council elections, Mendoza's Team Magsikap (LP-NPC) coalition won seven seats while Manalang's Tuloy Sigla coalition got three seats.

== Candidates ==
Parties are as stated in their certificate of candidacies.

=== Team Tuloy Sigla ===
Team Tuloy Sigla (Lakas)
Name	Party
For mayor
Gelacio Manalang	Lakas–Kampi
For vice mayor
Mike Tañedo	Lakas–Kampi
For councilor
Tyrone Aganon	Lakas
Jojo Briones	Lakas
Menchu Bucad	Lakas
Glenn Troy Caritativo	Lakas
Amado de Leon	Lakas
Marsha Marti	Lakas
Nikko Nisce	Lakas
Kris Rigor	Lakas
Ruben Santos	Lakas
Jat Tabamo	Lakas

=== Team Magsikap ===
Team Magsikap (LP-NPC)
Name	Party
For mayor
Genaro Mendoza	Liberal
For vice mayor
Ana Aguas	Liberal
For councilor
Pepito Basangan	Liberal
Anne Belmonte	NPC
Frank Dayao	Liberal
Topey delos Reyes	Liberal
Richard Diolazo	Liberal
Jelo Honrado	Liberal
Emily Ladera-Facunla	NPC
Weng Quiroz	NPC
Ferdz Vlad Rodriguez	Liberal
Noel Soliman	Liberal

=== Others ===
Partido Demokratiko Pilipino-Lakas ng Bayan
Name	Party
For councilor
Delmar Baluyot	PDP–Laban
Tom Dizon	PDP–Laban

Independent
Name	Party
For mayor
Danilo Asiaten	Independent
Jerome Lapeña	Independent
Roger Tomaroy	Independent

Independent
Name	Party
For councilor
Ed Aganon	Independent
Lita Briones	Independent
Ares Cortez	Independent
Pits David	Independent
Nap Ferrer	Independent
Ernie Galang	Independent
Gerardo Gomez	Independent
Roy Magbag	Independent
Romeo Mallari	Independent
Mark Martinez	Independent
Michael Ocampo	Independent
Dexter Regala	Independent
Cesar Rivera	Independent
Arturo Serrano	Independent
Leslie Tamangan	Independent
Jun Tanjuakio	Independent
Andres Tiru	Independent
Paul Villafaña	Independent

== Mayoral and vice mayoral elections ==
The candidates for mayor and vice mayor with the highest number of votes wins the seat; they are voted separately, therefore, they may be of different parties when elected.

=== Mayor ===
Tarlac City mayoral election
Party	Candidate	Votes	%
Lakas	Gelacio Manalang	49,444	43.25
Liberal	Aro Mendoza	34,413	30.19
Independent	Jerome Lapeña	20,013	17.51
Independent	Danilo Asiaten	10,111	8.84
Independent	Roger Tomaroy	233	0.20
Valid ballots		114,214	95.43
Invalid or blank votes		5,468	4.57
Total votes		119,682	100.00

=== Vice Mayor ===
Tarlac City vice mayoral election
Party	Candidate	Votes	%
Lakas	Mike Tañedo	68,279	66.52
Liberal	Ana Aguas	34,371	33.48
Valid ballots		102,650	85.76
Invalid or blank votes		17,032	14,24
Total votes		119,682	100.00

== City Council elections ==
Tarlac City elected Sangguniang Panlungsod or city council members. A voter votes for up to ten candidates, then the ten candidates with the highest number of votes are elected. Election is via plurality-at-large voting.

=== Results per candidate ===
2013 Tarlac City Council election
Party	Candidate	Votes	%
NPC	Anne Belmonte	49,978	41.75
Lakas	Jojo Briones	48,637	40.63
Liberal	Pepito Basangan	44,980	37.58
Liberal	Noel Soliman	42,190	35.25
Lakas	Kris Rigor	41,546	34.71
Liberal	Topey delos Reyes	41,057	34.30
Liberal	Jelo Honrado	39,682	33.15
Lakas	Glenn Caritativo	36,905	30.83
Liberal	Frank Dayao	36,074	30.14
NPC	Emily Ladera-Facunla	34,587	28.89
Liberal	Ricky Diolazo	34,115	28.50
Lakas	Amado de Leon	31,476	26.29
NPC	Weng Quiroz	29,948	25.02
Lakas	Nikko Nisce	29,676	24.79
Lakas	Jat Tabamo	29,676	24.79
PDP–Laban	Delmar Baluyot	26,089	21.79
Independent	Romeo Mallari	25,223	21.07
Liberal	Ferdz Vlad Rodriguez	24,235	20.24
Lakas	Menchu Bucad	23,908	19.97
Independent	Ernie Galang	14,119	11.79
Lakas	Tyrone Aganon	13,705	11.45
Independent	Arturo Serrano	13,571	11.33
Independent	Nap Ferrer	12,316	10.29
PDP–Laban	Tom Dizon	12,302	10.27
Lakas	Marsha Marti	11,664	9.74
Independent	Jun Tanjuakio	11,115	9.28
Independent	Michael Ocampo	9,745	8.14
Lakas	Ben Santos	9,608	8.14
Independent	Ed Aganon	8,291	6.92
Independent	Roy Magbag	8,254	6.89
Independent	Dexter Regala	7,694	6.42
Independent	Pits David	7,356	6.14
Independent	Lita Briones	7,201	6.01
Independent	Paul Villafaña	6,293	5.25
Independent	Mark Martinez	5,509	4.60
Independent	Andres Tiru	4,667	3.89
Independent	Gerardo Gomez	3,911	3.26
Independent	Cesar Rivera	3,169	2.64
Independent	Leslie Tamangan	1,455	1.21
Independent	Ares Cortez	1,332	1.12
Total votes			
