= Victoria, Tarlac =

Municipality in Tarlac, Philippines

Victoria
- Municipality
- Municipality of Victoria
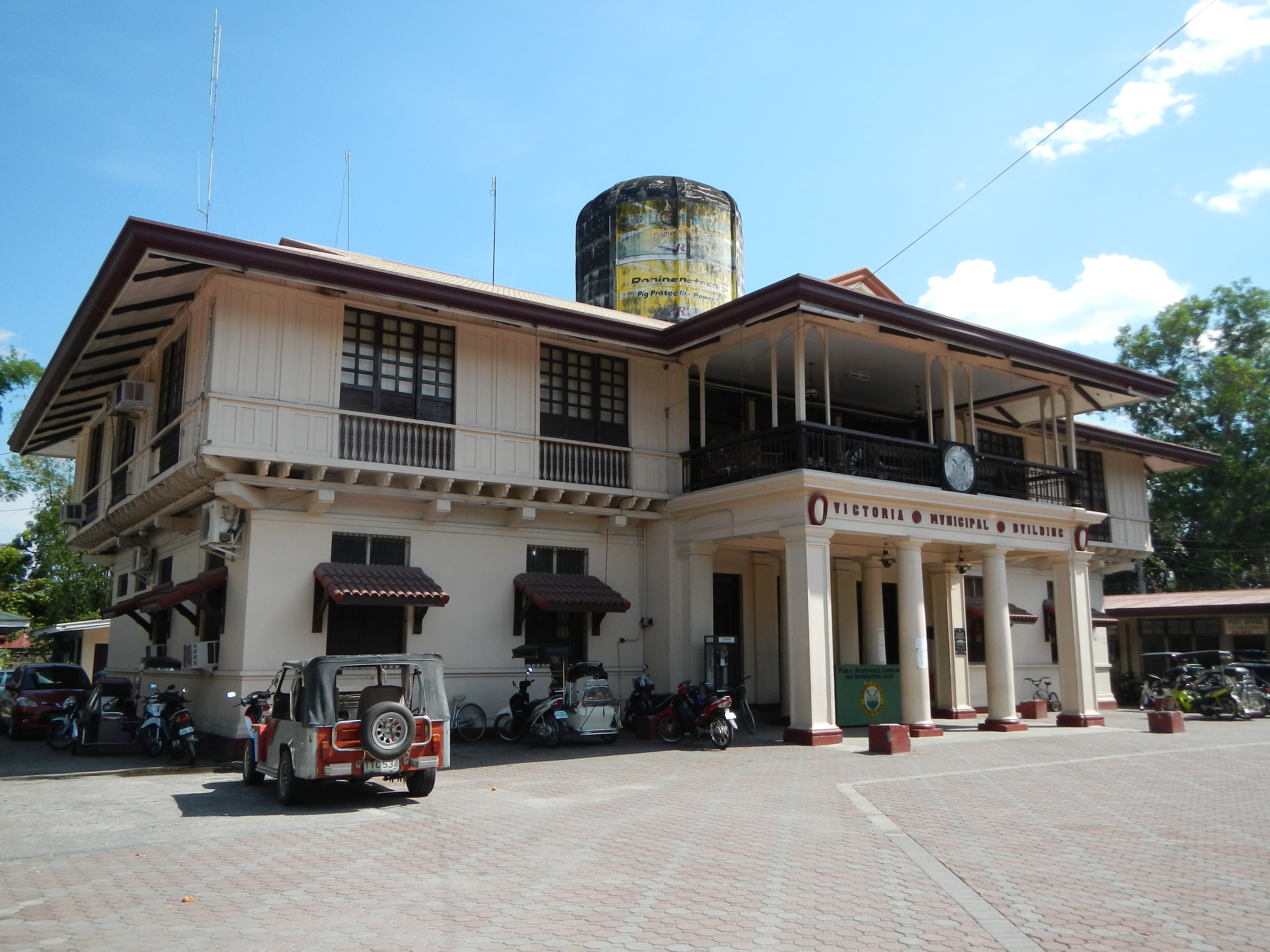
- Municipal Hall

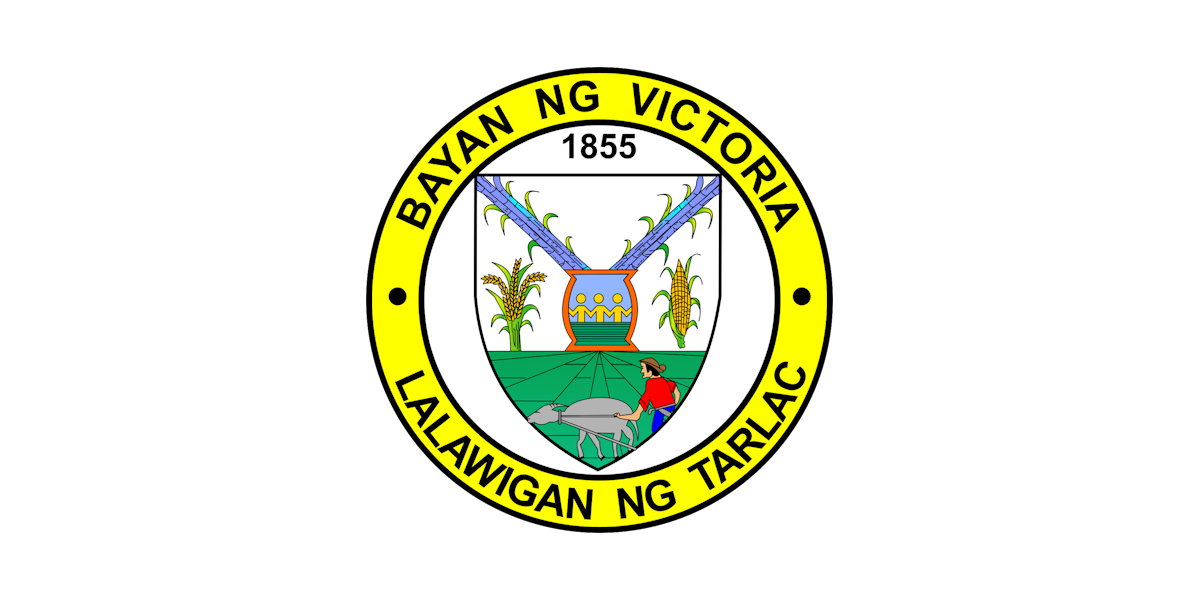
- Flag Seal

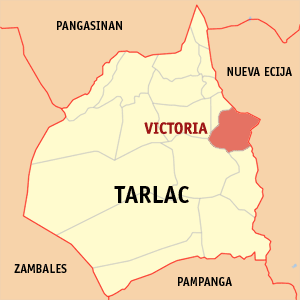
- Map of Tarlac with Victoria highlighted
- Interactive map of Victoria
- Location within the Philippines
- Coordinates: 15°34′41″N 120°40′55″E
- Country: Philippines
- Region: Central Luzon
- Province: Tarlac
- District: 2nd district
- Founded: March 28, 1855
- Barangays: 26 (see Barangays)

Government
  - Type: Sangguniang Bayan
  - Mayor: Rex C. Villa Agustin
  - Vice Mayor: Tristan Reevo "Tani" Guiam
  - Representative: Cristy Angeles
  - Electorate: 42,982 voters (2025)

Area
  - Total: 111.51 km^{2} (43.05 sq mi)
- Elevation: 26 m (85 ft)
- Highest elevation: 43 m (141 ft)
- Lowest elevation: 20 m (66 ft)

Population (2024 census)
  - Total: 71,495
  - Density: 641.15/km^{2} (1,660.6/sq mi)
  - Households: 16,939

Economy
  - Income class: 1st municipal income class
  - Poverty incidence: 14.75% (2023)
  - Revenue: ₱ 287.8 million (2024)
  - Assets: ₱ 821.3 million (2024)
  - Expenditure: ₱ 275.4 million (2024)
  - Liabilities: ₱ 227.8 million (2024)

Service provider
  - Electricity: Tarlac 1 Electric Cooperative (TARELCO 1)
- Time zone: UTC+8 (PST)
- ZIP code: 2313
- PSGC: 0306917000
- IDD : area code: +63 (0)45
- Native languages: Kapampangan; Tagalog; Ilocano
- Website: www.victoriatarlac.gov.ph

Victoria, officially the Municipality of Victoria (Ilocano: Ili ti Victoria; Kapampangan: Balen ning Victoria, Tagalog: Bayan ng Victoria), is a municipality in the province of Tarlac, Philippines. According to the 2024 census, it has a population of 71,495 people.

== History ==
The establishment of Victoria as a community may be traced back in the mid-1800s when the Spanish regime started to expand north from Manila. It almost happened at the same time when Porac and Floridablanca (now part of Pampanga) and Tarlac (now Tarlac City) were formed. In the mid-1800s people started to settle around the swamp or wetland in search for a place where food is abundant. By 1849, houses and pockets of communities were deriving subsistence from the wetland. The biggest sitio was Namitinan, which became part of the earliest barrio, called San Vicente de Canarum, which was formed in 1852.

Not until the signing of the decree by the Spanish Governor General Manuel Crespo on March 28, 1855, that barrio San Vicente de Canarum was separated from Tarlac to form an independent pueblo named Victoria. The name was used to highlight the victorious battle of the faithful followers of Queen Isabela II of Spain over their European enemies.

Traces of its Spanish history may still be seen in the well preserved municipal building, several old houses depicting Spanish architecture and various edifices that were built more than a hundred years ago.

=== 2026 Mollenido killings ===
In January 2026, the body of eight-year-old John Ysmael Mollenido was discovered in a calamansi farm in Barangay Maluid, a key development in the killings of Diane Marie and John Ysmael Mollenido.

== Geography ==
Victoria lies between 1"42’ north latitude and 120º35’ and 120"45 east longitude. It is bounded by Tarlac City to the southwest; the municipalities of Pura, Gerona, and La Paz to the northwest; and, the province of Nueva Ecija to the east. The municipality has a total land area of 11,150 hectares, of which a large portion is used for agricultural activities.

Victoria is 15 kilometres (9.3 mi) from Tarlac City and 139 kilometres (86 mi) from Manila.

=== Barangays ===
Victoria is politically subdivided into 26 barangays, as shown below.

- Baculong
- Balayang
- Balbaloto
- Bangar
- Bantog
- Batang-batang
- Bulo (Poblacion)
- Calibungan
- Canarem
- Cruz
- Lalapac
- Maluid
- Mangolago
- Masalasa
- Palac-palac
- San Agustin
- San Andres
- San Fernando (Poblacion)
- San Francisco
- San Gavino (Poblacion)
- San Jacinto
- San Nicolas (Poblacion)
- San Vicente (Poblacion)
- Santa Barbara (Poblacion)
- Santa Lucia (Poblacion)

=== Climate ===
Climate data for Victoria, Tarlac
Month	Jan	Feb	Mar	Apr	May	Jun	Jul	Aug	Sep	Oct	Nov	Dec	Year
Mean daily maximum °C (°F)	30 (86)	31 (88)	33 (91)	35 (95)	33 (91)	31 (88)	30 (86)	29 (84)	29 (84)	30 (86)	31 (88)	30 (86)	31 (88)
Mean daily minimum °C (°F)	19 (66)	19 (66)	20 (68)	22 (72)	24 (75)	24 (75)	24 (75)	24 (75)	23 (73)	22 (72)	21 (70)	20 (68)	22 (71)
Average precipitation mm (inches)	3 (0.1)	2 (0.1)	5 (0.2)	10 (0.4)	80 (3.1)	107 (4.2)	138 (5.4)	147 (5.8)	119 (4.7)	70 (2.8)	26 (1.0)	8 (0.3)	715 (28.1)
Average rainy days	2.0	1.7	2.7	4.6	16.1	20.8	24.0	23.0	21.4	15.5	8.0	3.2	143
Source: Meteoblue

== Demographics ==
Population census of Victoria

Year	Pop.	±% p.a.
1903	14,945	—
1918	15,661	+0.31%
1939	19,575	+1.07%
1948	24,398	+2.48%
1960	26,555	+0.71%
1970	33,141	+2.24%
1975	34,889	+1.04%
1980	34,942	+0.03%

Year	Pop.	±% p.a.
1990	42,360	+1.94%
1995	47,546	+2.19%
2000	50,930	+1.48%
2007	57,085	+1.59%
2010	59,987	+1.82%
2015	63,715	+1.15%
2020	69,370	+1.81%
2024	71,495	+0.73%

Source: Philippine Statistics Authority

In the 2020 census, the population of Victoria, Tarlac, was 69,370 people, with a density of 620 inhabitants per square kilometre or 1,600 inhabitants per square mile.

== Economy ==
Poverty incidence of Victoria (%)

Source: Philippine Statistics Authority

=== Victoria Industrial Park ===
Victoria Industrial Park, established in 2024, is a Philippine special economic zone comprising 297 hectares (730 acres) located in Barangay Baculong. It was created on July 4, 2024 by Proclamation No. 623 pursuant to Republic Act No. 7916 (the Special Economic Zone Act of 1995). The park will be evaluated by the Philippine Economic Zone Authority (PEZA) through engineering and feasibility studies.

== Education ==
There are two schools district offices which govern all educational institutions within the municipality. They oversee the management and operations of all private and public, from primary to secondary schools. These are Victoria East Schools District Office, and Victoria West Schools District Office.

=== Primary and elementary schools ===
- Balayang Elementary School
- Balbaloto Elementary School
- Bangar Elementary School
- Bantog Elementary School
- Batangbatang Elementary School
- Boaz Promise Land Academy
- Bulo Elementary School
- Cabuluan Elementary School
- Calibungan Elementary School
- Canarem Elementary School
- CC Smart Kidz School
- Cruz Elementary School
- Gabaldon Elementary School
- Immaculate Conception Parish Learning Center
- King David Victorius School
- Lalapac Elementary School
- Maluid Cabrera Elementary School
- Mangolago Elementary School
- Masalasa Elementary School
- Palacpalac Elementary School
- Rosebelle Colleges, Inc.
- San Agustin Elementary School
- San Andres Elementary School
- San Francisco Elementary School
- San Jacinto Elementary School
- Victoria Catholic School
- Victoria East Central School
- Victoria West Central School
- Victoria United Methodist Christian School

=== Secondary schools ===
- Balayang High School
- Calibungan High School
- Don Casimiro G. Tanedo Integrated School
- Makabulos Memorial High School
- Victoria Catholic School
- Victoria National High School
