= Cristy Angeles =

Filipino politician (born 1959)

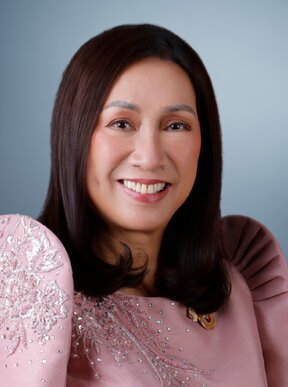
- Official portrait, 2025

Member of the House of Representatives from Tarlac’s 2nd district
- Incumbent
- Assumed office June 30, 2025
- Preceded by: Christian Yap

Mayor of Tarlac City
- In office June 30, 2016 – June 30, 2025
- Vice Mayor: Genaro Mendoza
- Preceded by: Gelacio Manalang
- Succeeded by: Susan Yap

Member of the Tarlac Provincial Board from the 2nd district
- In office June 30, 2013 – June 30, 2016 Serving with Harmes Sembrano, Joji David and Henry de Leon

Personal details
- Born: Maria Cristina Puno Cuello; November 29, 1959 (age 66) Tarlac, Tarlac, Philippines
- Party: PFP (2024–present)
- Other political affiliations: NPC (2012–2024)
- Spouse: Victor Angeles (m. 1986)
- Children: 4
- Education: University of Santo Tomas (BS)
- Occupation: Politician

Maria Cristina "Cristy" Puno Cuello-Angeles (born November 29, 1959) is a Filipino politician currently serving as representative of the 2nd district of Tarlac since 2025. She previously served as mayor of Tarlac City from 2016 to 2025.

== Early life and education ==
Angeles was born on November 29, 1959, in the then-municipality of Tarlac to Virgilio Sarmiento Cuello from Laguna and Teodora Puno-Cuello from Tarlac. She studied College of the Holy Spirit of Tarlac for her primary and high school education. She studied University of Santo Tomas with the degree of Bachelor of Science in commerce.

== Political career ==
=== Board Member (2013–2016) ===
Angeles was a member of the Tarlac Provincial Board from 2nd district from 2013 to 2016.

=== Mayor of Tarlac City (2016–2025) ===
In 2016, Angeles was elected as first female mayor of Tarlac City. She served for three consecutive terms.

=== House of Representatives (2025–present) ===
In 2025 elections, Angeles became a representative for the second district of Tarlac after she beat Victor Yap over 23,848 votes.

== Personal life ==
In February 1986, Angeles is married to Victor Angeles, a businessman and has four children including Katrina Theresa Angeles, current vice mayor of Tarlac City since 2025.

Her husband, Victor, ran for mayor of Tarlac City but he lost to Susan Yap in the 2025 elections.

== Electoral history ==
Electoral history of Cristy Angeles
Year	Office	Party	Votes received				Result
Year	Office	Party	Total	%	P.	Swing	Result
2013	Board Member (Tarlac–2nd)	NPC	119,265	—N/a	1st	—N/a	Won
2016	Mayor of Tarlac City	NPC	81,886	56.21%	1st	—N/a	Won
2019	Mayor of Tarlac City	NPC	112,246	—N/a	1st	—N/a	Won
2022	Mayor of Tarlac City	NPC	139,644	—N/a	1st	—N/a	Won
2025	Representative (Tarlac–2nd)	PFP	167,716	53.83%	1st	—N/a	Won
