= Tarlac's 2nd congressional district =

Legislative district of the Philippines

- Constituency for the House of Representatives of the Philippines
- Map
- Location of Tarlac within the Philippines
- Province: Tarlac
- Region: Central Luzon
- Population: 590,435 (2020)
- Electorate: 332,594 (2022)
- Major settlements: 4 LGUs: Cities; Tarlac City; Municipalities; Gerona; San Jose; Victoria
- Area: 1,107.87 km^{2} (427.75 sq mi)

Current constituency
- Created: 1907
- Representative: Cristy Angeles
- Political party: PFP
- Congressional bloc: Majority

Tarlac's 2nd congressional district is one of the three congressional districts of the Philippines in the province of Tarlac. It has been represented in the House of Representatives of the Philippines since 1916 and earlier in the Philippine Assembly from 1907 to 1916. The district consists of the provincial capital, Tarlac City, and adjacent municipalities of Gerona, San Jose and Victoria. It is currently represented in the 20th Congress by Cristy Angeles of the Partido Federal ng Pilipinas (PFP).

Prior to its second dissolution in 1972, the district encompassed the southern municipalities of Bamban, Capas, Concepcion, La Paz, Tarlac, and Victoria.

== Representation history ==
#	Image	Member	Term of office		Legislature	Party	Electoral history	Constituent LGUs
#	Image	Member	Start	End	Legislature	Party	Electoral history	Constituent LGUs
=== Tarlac's 2nd district for the Philippine Assembly ===
District created January 9, 1907.
1		Aurelio Pineda	October 16, 1907	October 16, 1909	1st	Progresista	Elected in 1907.	1907–1916; Bamban, Capas, Concepcion, La Paz, Tarlac, Victoria
2		Marciano Barrera	October 16, 1909	October 16, 1912	2nd	Nacionalista	Elected in 1909.	1907–1916; Bamban, Capas, Concepcion, La Paz, Tarlac, Victoria
3		José Espinosa	October 16, 1912	October 16, 1916	3rd	Nacionalista	Elected in 1912.	1907–1916; Bamban, Capas, Concepcion, La Paz, Tarlac, Victoria
=== Tarlac's 2nd district for the House of Representatives of the Philippine Islands ===
4		Cayetano Rivera	October 16, 1916	June 3, 1919	4th	Independent	Elected in 1916.	1916–1935; Bamban, Capas, Concepcion, La Paz, Tarlac, Victoria
5		Benigno Aquino Sr.	June 3, 1919	June 5, 1928	5th	Nacionalista	Elected in 1919.	1916–1935; Bamban, Capas, Concepcion, La Paz, Tarlac, Victoria
5		Benigno Aquino Sr.	June 3, 1919	June 5, 1928	6th	Nacionalista; Unipersonalista	Re-elected in 1922.	1916–1935; Bamban, Capas, Concepcion, La Paz, Tarlac, Victoria
5		Benigno Aquino Sr.	June 3, 1919	June 5, 1928	7th	Nacionalista; Consolidado	Re-elected in 1925.	1916–1935; Bamban, Capas, Concepcion, La Paz, Tarlac, Victoria
6		José G. Domingo	June 5, 1928	June 5, 1934	8th	Demócrata	Elected in 1928.	1916–1935; Bamban, Capas, Concepcion, La Paz, Tarlac, Victoria
6		José G. Domingo	June 5, 1928	June 5, 1934	9th	Demócrata	Re-elected in 1931.	1916–1935; Bamban, Capas, Concepcion, La Paz, Tarlac, Victoria
7		Feliciano B. Gardiner	June 5, 1934	September 16, 1935	10th	Nacionalista; Demócrata Pro-Independencia	Elected in 1934.	1916–1935; Bamban, Capas, Concepcion, La Paz, Tarlac, Victoria
#	Image	Member	Term of office		National Assembly	Party	Electoral history	Constituent LGUs
#	Image	Member	Start	End	National Assembly	Party	Electoral history	Constituent LGUs
=== Tarlac's 2nd district for the National Assembly (Commonwealth of the Philippines) ===
(5)		Benigno Aquino Sr.	September 16, 1935	December 30, 1938	1st	Nacionalista; Demócrata Pro-Independencia	Elected in 1935.	1935–1941; Bamban, Capas, Concepcion, La Paz, Tarlac, Victoria
8		José Urquico	December 30, 1938	December 30, 1941	2nd	Nacionalista	Elected in 1938.	1935–1941; Bamban, Capas, Concepcion, La Paz, Tarlac, Victoria
District dissolved into the two-seat Tarlac's at-large district for the National Assembly (Second Philippine Republic).
#	Image	Member	Term of office		Common wealth Congress	Party	Electoral history	Constituent LGUs
#	Image	Member	Start	End	Common wealth Congress	Party	Electoral history	Constituent LGUs
=== Tarlac's 2nd district for the House of Representatives of the Commonwealth of the Philippines ===
District re-created May 24, 1945.
(5)		Benigno Aquino Sr.	June 11, 1945	May 25, 1946	1st	Nacionalista	Elected in 1941.	1945–1946; Bamban, Capas, Concepcion, La Paz, Tarlac, Victoria
#	Image	Member	Term of office		Congress	Party	Electoral history	Constituent LGUs
#	Image	Member	Start	End	Congress	Party	Electoral history	Constituent LGUs
=== Tarlac's 2nd district for the House of Representatives of the Philippines ===
9		Alejandro Simpauco	May 25, 1946	December 30, 1949	1st	Democratic Alliance	Elected in 1946. Oath of office deferred due to electoral protests against Democratic Alliance candidates.	1946–1972; Bamban, Capas, Concepcion, La Paz, Tarlac, Victoria
10		José Y. Feliciano	December 30, 1949	December 30, 1953	2nd	Liberal	Elected in 1949.	1946–1972; Bamban, Capas, Concepcion, La Paz, Tarlac, Victoria
11		Constancio Castañeda	December 30, 1953	December 30, 1965	3rd	Nacionalista	Elected in 1953.	1946–1972; Bamban, Capas, Concepcion, La Paz, Tarlac, Victoria
11		Constancio Castañeda	December 30, 1953	December 30, 1965	4th	Nacionalista	Re-elected in 1957.	1946–1972; Bamban, Capas, Concepcion, La Paz, Tarlac, Victoria
11		Constancio Castañeda	December 30, 1953	December 30, 1965	5th	Nacionalista	Re-elected in 1961.	1946–1972; Bamban, Capas, Concepcion, La Paz, Tarlac, Victoria
12		José V. Yap	December 30, 1965	September 23, 1972	6th	Liberal	Elected in 1965.	1946–1972; Bamban, Capas, Concepcion, La Paz, Tarlac, Victoria
12		José V. Yap	December 30, 1965	September 23, 1972	7th	Liberal	Re-elected in 1969. Removed from office after imposition of martial law.	1946–1972; Bamban, Capas, Concepcion, La Paz, Tarlac, Victoria
District dissolved into the sixteen-seat Region III's at-large district for the Interim Batasang Pambansa, followed by the two-seat Tarlac's at-large district for the Regular Batasang Pambansa.
District re-created February 2, 1987.
(12)		Jose V. Yap	June 30, 1987	June 30, 1998	8th	PDP–Laban	Elected in 1987.	1987–present Gerona, San Jose, Tarlac City, Victoria
(12)		Jose V. Yap	June 30, 1987	June 30, 1998	9th	LDP	Re-elected in 1992.	1987–present Gerona, San Jose, Tarlac City, Victoria
(12)		Jose V. Yap	June 30, 1987	June 30, 1998	10th	Lakas	Re-elected in 1995.	1987–present Gerona, San Jose, Tarlac City, Victoria
13		Benigno Aquino III	June 30, 1998	June 30, 2007	11th	Liberal	Elected in 1998.	1987–present Gerona, San Jose, Tarlac City, Victoria
13		Benigno Aquino III	June 30, 1998	June 30, 2007	12th	Liberal	Re-elected in 2001.	1987–present Gerona, San Jose, Tarlac City, Victoria
13		Benigno Aquino III	June 30, 1998	June 30, 2007	13th	Liberal	Re-elected in 2004.	1987–present Gerona, San Jose, Tarlac City, Victoria
(12)		Jose V. Yap	June 30, 2007	March 10, 2010	14th	Lakas	Elected in 2007. Died in office.	1987–present Gerona, San Jose, Tarlac City, Victoria
–		vacant	March 10, 2010	June 30, 2010	14th	–	No special election held to fill vacancy.	1987–present Gerona, San Jose, Tarlac City, Victoria
14		Susan Yap	June 30, 2010	June 30, 2016	15th	NPC	Elected in 2010.	1987–present Gerona, San Jose, Tarlac City, Victoria
14		Susan Yap	June 30, 2010	June 30, 2016	16th	NPC	Re-elected in 2013.	1987–present Gerona, San Jose, Tarlac City, Victoria
15		Victor A. Yap	June 30, 2016	June 30, 2022	17th	NPC	Elected in 2016.	1987–present Gerona, San Jose, Tarlac City, Victoria
15		Victor A. Yap	June 30, 2016	June 30, 2022	18th	NPC	Re-elected in 2019.	1987–present Gerona, San Jose, Tarlac City, Victoria
16		Christian Tell A. Yap	June 30, 2022	June 30, 2025	19th	NPC	Elected in 2022.	1987–present Gerona, San Jose, Tarlac City, Victoria
16		Christian Tell A. Yap	June 30, 2022	June 30, 2025	19th	SST	Elected in 2022.	1987–present Gerona, San Jose, Tarlac City, Victoria
17		Maria Cristina C. Angeles	June 30, 2025	Incumbent	20th	PFP	Elected in 2025.	1987–present Gerona, San Jose, Tarlac City, Victoria

== Election results ==
=== 2025 ===
2025 Philippine House of Representatives elections
Party	Candidate	Votes	%
PFP	Cristy Angeles	167,716	53.83%
SST	Victor Yap	143,868	46.17%
Total votes		311,584	100%
PFP gain from NPC			

=== 2022 ===
2022 Philippine House of Representatives elections
Party	Candidate	Votes	%
NPC	Christian Yap	208,195	82.01
PDP–Laban	Faustino Galang II	45,668	17.99
Valid ballots		253,863	86.75
Invalid or blank votes		38,781	13.25
Total votes		292,644	100.00
NPC hold			

=== 2019 ===
2019 Philippine House of Representatives elections
Party	Candidate	Votes	%
NPC	Victor Yap	211,834	94.66
Independent	Jorge delos Reyes	11,949	5.34
Valid ballots		223,783	88.19
Invalid or blank votes		29,971	11.81
Total votes		253,754	100.00
NPC hold			

=== 2016 ===
2016 Philippine House of Representatives elections
Party	Candidate	Votes	%
NPC	Victor Yap	165,982	79.72
PMP	Florentino Galang	40,685	19.54
Independent	Joseph Doloricon	1,543	0.74
Invalid or blank votes		33,056	13.70
Total votes		241,266	100.00
NPC hold			

=== 2013 ===
2013 Philippine House of Representatives elections
Party	Candidate	Votes	%
NPC	Susan Yap-Sulit	121,341	68.04
Lakas	Josefino Rigor	34,750	19.48
Independent	Ernesto Calma	1,753	0.98
Margin of victory		86,591	48.55%
Invalid or blank votes		20,499	11.49
Total votes		178,343	100.00
NPC hold			

=== 2010 ===
2010 Philippine House of Representatives elections
Party	Candidate	Votes	%
Lakas–Kampi	Susan Yap-Sulit	124,190	63.78
Liberal	Genaro Malvar Mendoza	70,522	36.22
Valid ballots		194,712	95.52
Invalid or blank votes		9,139	4.48
Total votes		203,851	100.00
Lakas–Kampi hold			

== See also ==
- Legislative districts of Tarlac
