= Tarlac City =

Capital city of Tarlac, Philippines

- Component city
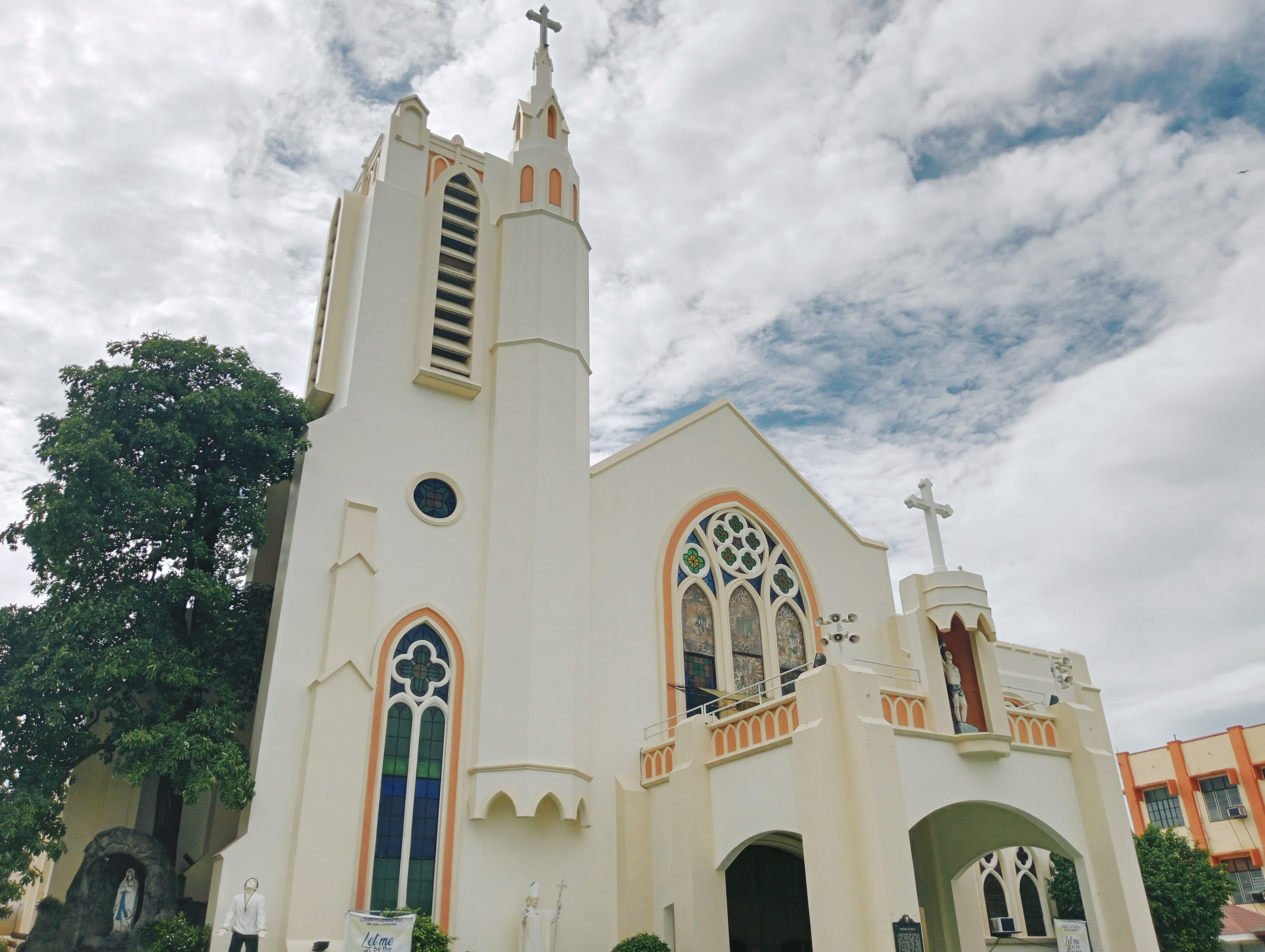
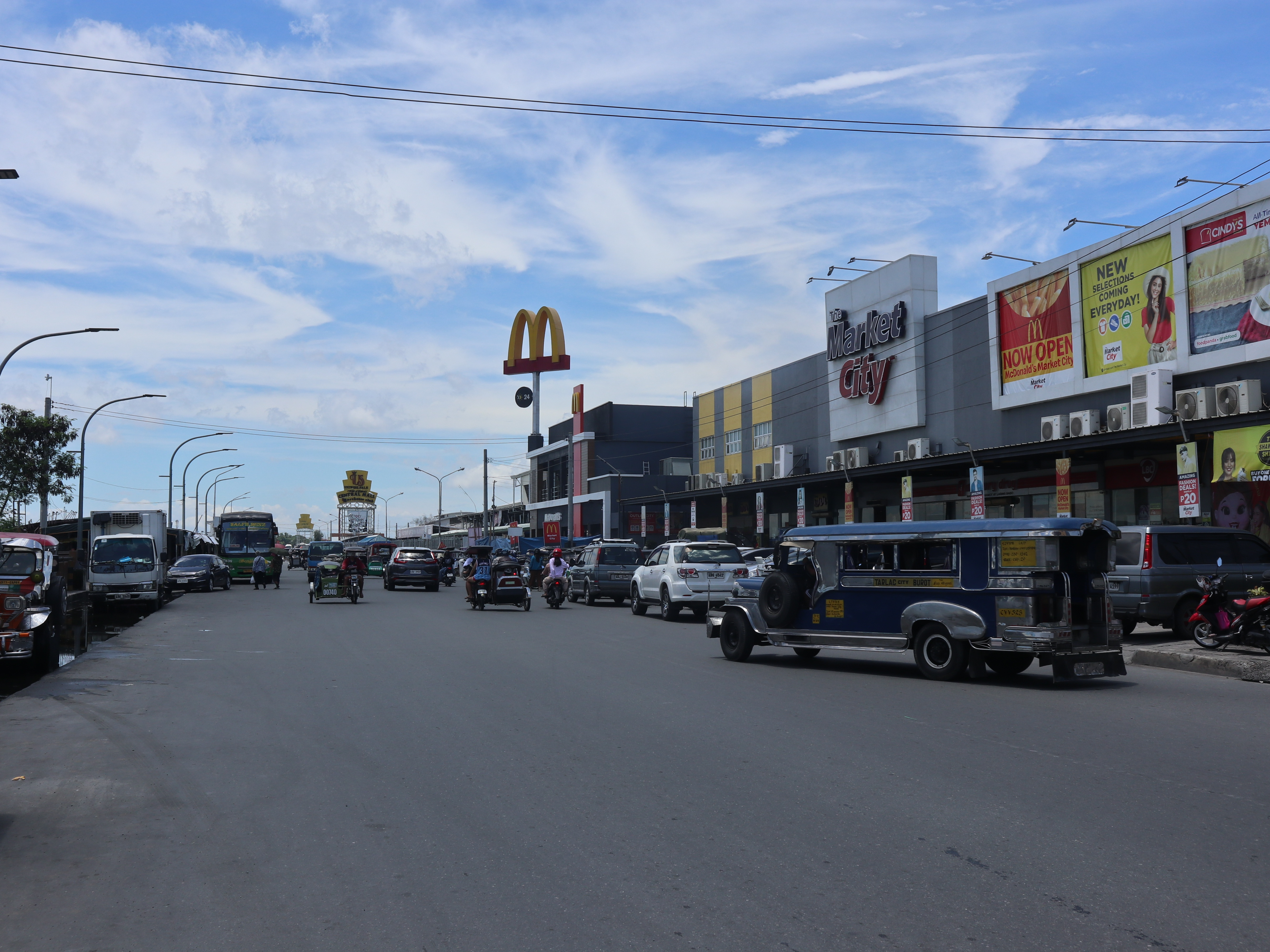
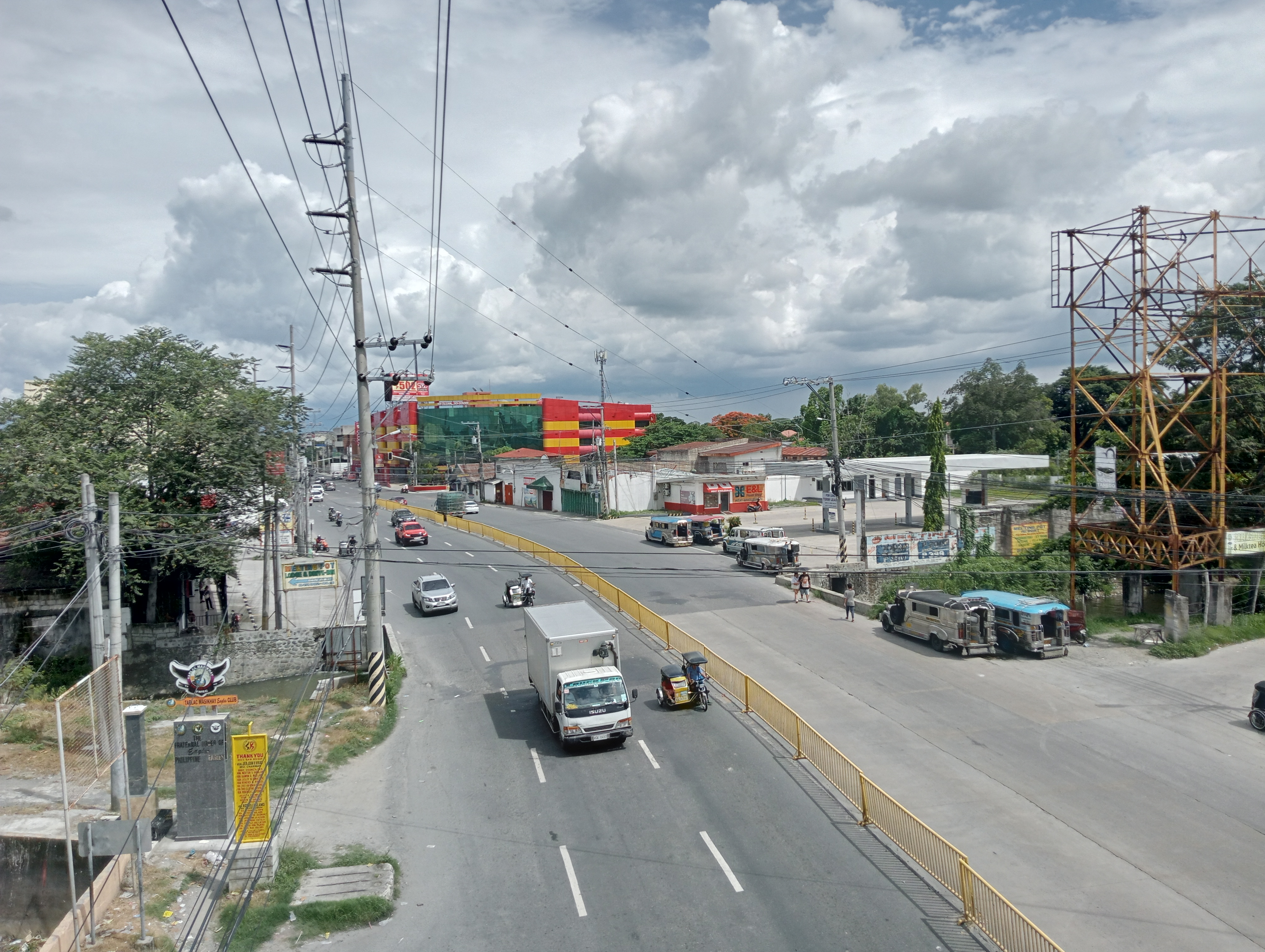
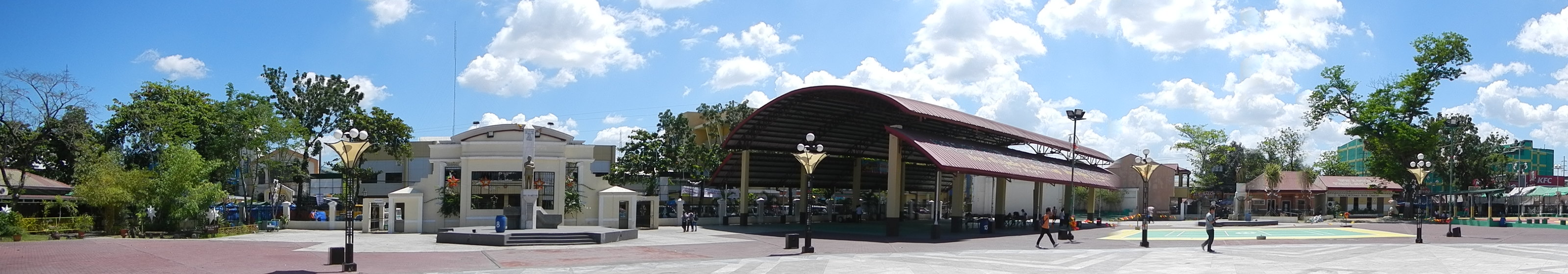
- From top, left to right: San Sebastian Cathedral, Ninoy Aquino Boulevard, MacArthur Highway along Tarlac City, Tarlac City Plazuela

- Flag Seal
- Motto: MaSaYa sa Tarlac City
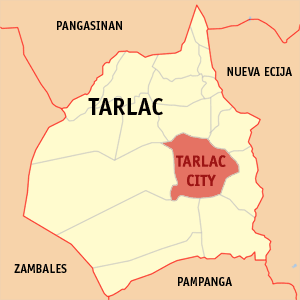
- Map of Tarlac with Tarlac City highlighted
- Interactive map of Tarlac City
- Location within the Philippines
- Coordinates: 15°29′13″N 120°35′24″E
- Country: Philippines
- Region: Central Luzon
- Province: Tarlac
- District: 2nd district
- Founded: 1788
- Cityhood: April 18, 1998
- Barangays: 76 (see Barangays)

Government
  - Type: Sangguniang Panlungsod
  - Mayor: Susan Areno Yap-Sulit (NPC)
  - Vice Mayor: Katrina Theresa "KT" Angeles (PFP)
  - Representative: Maria Cristina C. Angeles (PFP)
  - City Council: Members: Diosdado "Jojo" A. Briones (PFP); Genise Anne P. Delos Reyes (PFP); Pee Jay E. Basangan (NPC); Enrico J. De Leon (PFP); Cesar P. Go (PFP); Rowel P. Quiroz (PFP); Emily L. Facunla (NPC); Jerome H. Lapeña (NPC); Jude Joseph S. David (NPC); Maria Antonette I. Belmonte (NPC)
  - Electorate: 229,255 voters (2025)

Area
  - Total: 274.66 km^{2} (106.05 sq mi)
- Elevation: 61 m (200 ft)
- Highest elevation: 490 m (1,610 ft)
- Lowest elevation: 14 m (46 ft)

Population (2024 census)
  - Total: 401,892
  - Density: 1,463.2/km^{2} (3,789.8/sq mi)
  - Households: 90,676
- Demonym(s): Tarlaqueño (Male), Tarlaqueña (Female), Tarlaquenean

Economy
  - Income class: 1st city income class
  - Poverty incidence: 10.35% (2023)
  - Revenue: ₱ 2,716 million (2024)
  - Assets: ₱ 8,013 million (2024)
  - Expenditure: ₱ 1,953 million (2024)
  - Liabilities: ₱ 1,819 million (2024)

Service provider
  - Electricity: Tarlac Electric Incorporated (TEI)
- Time zone: UTC+8 (PST)
- ZIP code: 2300
- PSGC: 036916000
- IDD : area code: +63 (0)45
- Native languages: Kapampangan; Ilocano; Tagalog
- Website: www.tarlaccity.gov.ph

Tarlac City, officially the City of Tarlac (Kapampangan: Lakanbalen ning Tarlac; Pangasinan: Siyudad na Tarlac; Ilocano: Siudad ti Tarlac; Filipino: Lungsod ng Tarlac [tɐɾˈlak]), is a first-class component city and capital of the province of Tarlac, Philippines. According to the 2024 census, it has a population of 401,892 people, making it the most populous in the province.

== History ==
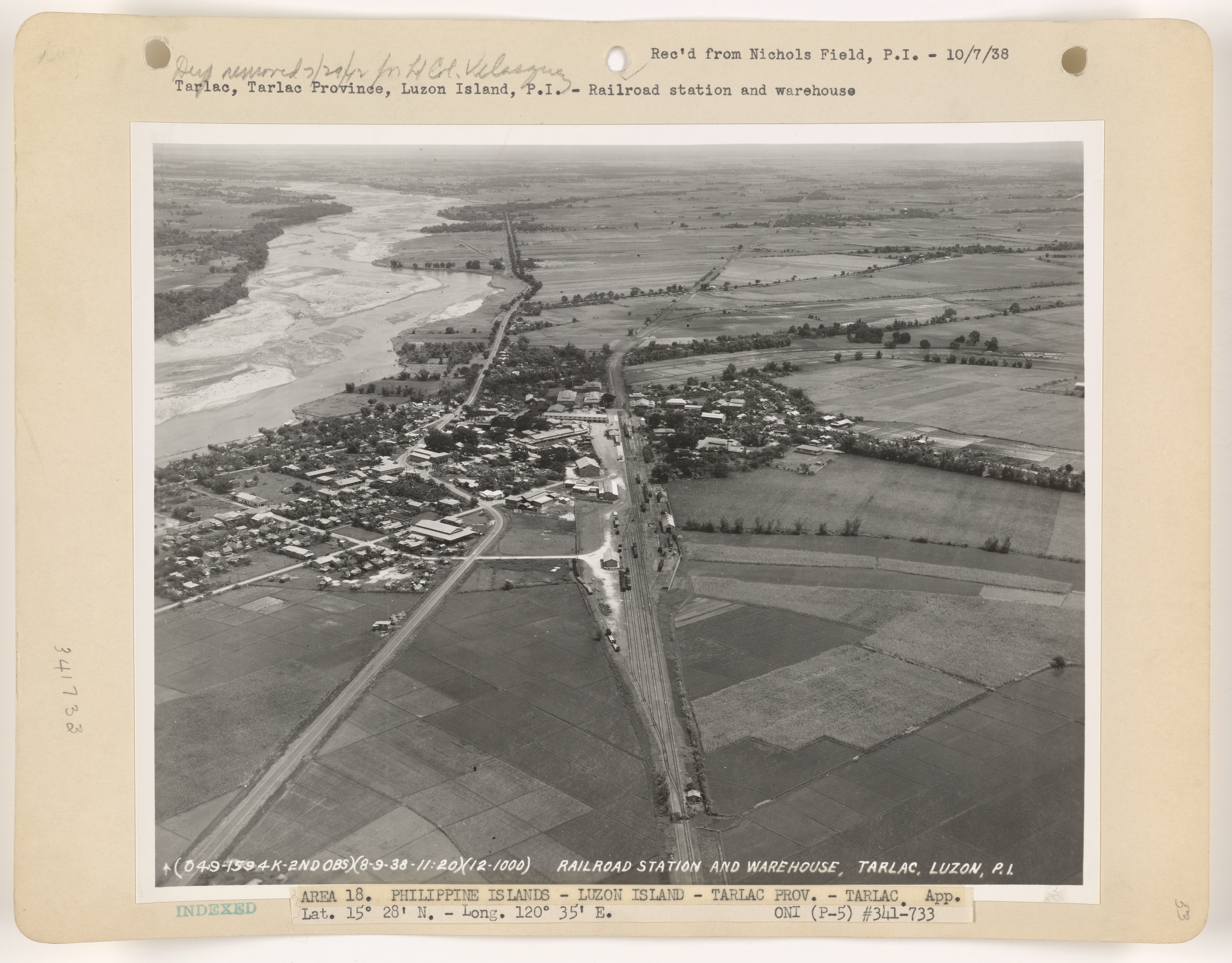
Aerial view of Tarlac, circa 1930s

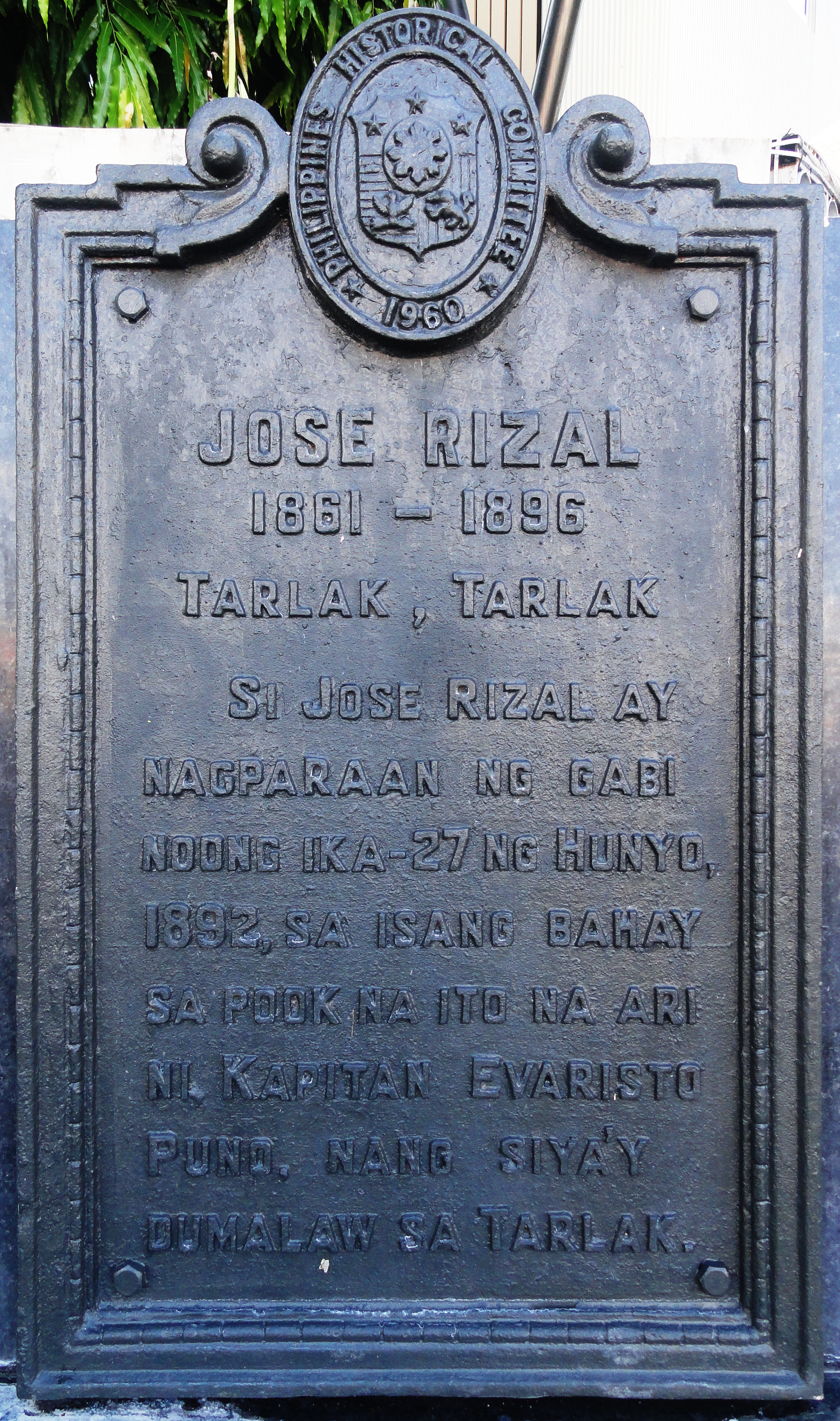
Historical marker of José Rizal's stay in "Tarlak" in 1892

Tarlac's first settlers came from Bacolor, Pampanga. They cleared the area, fertilised the soil, and then established their settlement here in 1788. Tarlac's name is a Hispanized derivation from a talahib weed called tarlak, an Aeta term. The area around the current capital city was described as matarlak or malatarlak, a word meaning "abundant with tarlak grass." This small community of settlers experienced rapid population growth, as settlers from Bataan, Pampanga and Zambales moved into the area. The Kapampangan language, which is the language of Pampanga, became the native language of this town. Roads and barrios were built over the following decades through hard work of its residents. Following the foundation of the province of Tarlac in 1872, Tarlac was designated as the capital of the new province.

=== Cityhood ===
On June 21, 1969, President Ferdinand Marcos signed and approved the Republic Act 5907, converting this municipality into a city. However, its plebiscite was unsuccessful, showing their voters rejected cityhood.

On April 21, 1990, the barangays of Burgos, David, Iba, Labney, Lawacamulag, Lubigan, Maamot, Mababanaba, Moriones, Pao, San Juan de Valdez, Sula, and Villa Aglipay, originally part of the then-municipality of Tarlac, separated and formed to be the part of San Jose. Tarlac now retains its 274.66 km^{2} (106.05 sq mi) area.

Finally, on March 12, 1998, Republic Act No. 8593 was signed by President Fidel V. Ramos, making Tarlac as the component city of the province of Tarlac. On April 18, 1998, its residents approved the conversion of the municipality into a city. Tarlac was proclaimed as the component city by COMELEC on the next day, on April 19, 1998.

==== Highly Urbanized City ====
On October 27, 2005, President Gloria Macapagal Arroyo signed Proclamation No. 940, classifying Tarlac City as a highly urbanized city (HUC) in the province. However, the provincial government opposed the city's campaign for conversion into HUC. The majority of voters rejected the conversion in the plebiscite on February 11, 2006.

== Geography ==
Tarlac City is located 58 kilometres (36 mi) north of Central Luzon's regional center San Fernando, 124 kilometres (77 mi) north of Manila, and 126 kilometres (78 mi) from Baguio.

The city is situated at the center of the province of Tarlac, along the Tarlac River. To its north are Gerona and Santa Ignacia, to the west is San Jose, to the south are Capas and Concepcion, and to the east are Victoria and La Paz.

Tarlac City is approximately 24 metres (79 ft) above sea level on some parts but reaching even 50 metres (160 ft) on large western portions. Tarlac City was historically a part of what is now Porac. Parts of Tarlac City are claimed to be among the few portions of land in the province which was not created by ancient eruptions from Mount Pinatubo.

=== Barangays ===
Tarlac City is politically subdivided into 76 barangays, as shown below. Each barangay consists of puroks and some have sitios.

- Aguso
- Alvindia
- Amucao
- Armenia
- Asturias
- Atioc
- Balanti
- Balete
- Balibago I
- Balibago II
- Balingcanaway
- Banaba
- Bantog
- Baras-baras
- Batang-batang
- Binauganan
- Bora
- Buenavista
- Buhilit
- Burot
- Calingcuan
- Capehan
- Carangian
- Care
- Central
- Culipat
- Cut-cut I
- Cut-cut II
- Dalayap
- Dela Paz
- Dolores
- Laoang
- Ligtasan
- Lourdes
- Mabini
- Maligaya
- Maliwalo
- Mapalacsiao (formerly Luisita, see Hacienda Luisita)
- Mapalad
- Matatalaib
- Paraiso
- Poblacion
- Salapungan
- San Carlos
- San Francisco
- San Isidro
- San Jose
- San Jose de Urquico
- San Juan Bautista (formerly Matadero)
- San Juan de Mata (formerly Malatiki)
- San Luis
- San Manuel
- San Miguel
- San Nicolas
- San Pablo
- San Pascual
- San Rafael
- San Roque
- San Sebastian
- San Vicente
- Santa Cruz
- Santa Maria
- Santo Cristo
- Santo Domingo
- Santo Niño
- Sapang Maragul
- Sapang Tagalog
- Sepung Calzada (Panampunan)
- Sinait
- Suizo
- Tariji
- Tibag
- Tibagan
- Trinidad
- Ungot
- Villa Bacolor

=== Climate ===
Climate data for Tarlac City
Month	Jan	Feb	Mar	Apr	May	Jun	Jul	Aug	Sep	Oct	Nov	Dec	Year
Mean daily maximum °C (°F)	30 (86)	31 (88)	33 (91)	34 (93)	33 (91)	31 (88)	29 (84)	29 (84)	29 (84)	30 (86)	30 (86)	29 (84)	31 (87)
Mean daily minimum °C (°F)	19 (66)	19 (66)	20 (68)	22 (72)	24 (75)	24 (75)	24 (75)	24 (75)	24 (75)	22 (72)	21 (70)	20 (68)	22 (71)
Average precipitation mm (inches)	5 (0.2)	5 (0.2)	10 (0.4)	23 (0.9)	136 (5.4)	191 (7.5)	245 (9.6)	241 (9.5)	200 (7.9)	108 (4.3)	36 (1.4)	12 (0.5)	1,212 (47.8)
Average rainy days	2.6	2.5	4.4	8.3	20.9	24.4	27.4	26.9	25.0	18.2	9.2	3.6	173.4
Source: Meteoblue (modeled/calculated data, not measured locally)

== Demographics ==
Population census of Tarlac City

Year	Pop.	±% p.a.
1903	15,044	—
1918	24,460	+3.29%
1939	55,682	+3.99%
1948	64,597	+1.66%
1960	98,285	+3.56%
1970	135,128	+3.23%

Year	Pop.	±% p.a.
1975	160,595	+3.52%
1980	175,691	+1.81%
1990	208,722	+1.74%
1995	230,459	+1.87%
2000	262,481	+2.83%
2007	314,155	+2.51%

Year	Pop.	±% p.a.
2010	318,332	+0.48%
2015	342,493	+1.40%
2020	385,398	+2.52%
2024	401,892	+1.01%

Source: Philippine Statistics Authority

In the 2024 census, the population of Tarlac City was 401,892 people, with a density of 1,500 inhabitants per square kilometre or 3,900 inhabitants per square mile.

=== Languages ===
Being at the meeting point of both Kapampangan and Pangasinan languages, cultures, and ethnicities, both languages are predominantly spoken in the city and environs. Ilocano and Tagalog are also used, especially those with Ilocano and/or Tagalog ethnicity/ancestry, respectively, with the latter language also serving as a medium for inter-ethnic communications. As the majority of the residents are Kapampangans, most of the Pangasinans, Ilocanos, and Tagalogs speak Kapampangan as first language.

=== Religion ===
According to statistics compiled by the Philippine government, the most dominant religion in the city is Christianity. The majority of Christians are Roman Catholics followed by a large concentration of Iglesia ni Cristo (Church of Christ). Other Christian groups belong to various Protestant denominations. There are some being non-Christian such as Muslims, etc.

== Economy ==
Poverty incidence of Tarlac City (%)

Source: Philippine Statistics Authority

=== Shopping malls ===
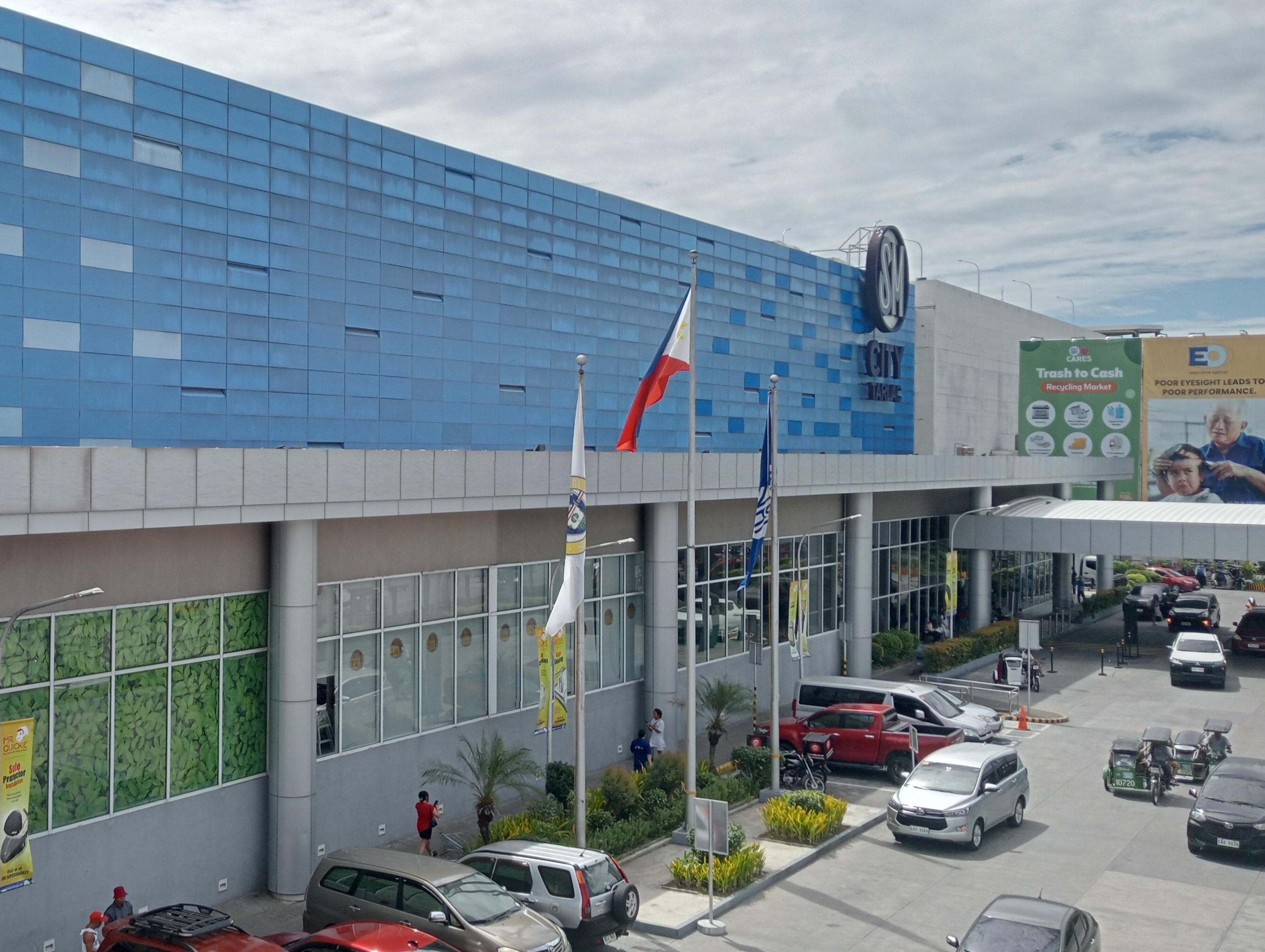
SM City Tarlac

There are several shopping malls established within the city. To name a few, there is the SM City Tarlac, which is the first SM Supermall in the Tarlac Province, located along McArthur Highway in San Roque; Plaza Luisita Mall, which is the first shopping center in Central Luzon (now Robinsons Luisita); the Magic Star Mall along Romulo Blvd. in Barangay Cut-cut; My MetroTown Mall in Barangay Sto Cristo; Palm Plaza Mall located along McArthur Highway corner F. Tanedo St. Barangay Matatalaib; CityWalk also located in Barangay San Roque and CityMall located in Barangay San Rafael.

== Education ==
Aquino Center and Museum

As the educational center of Tarlac, Tarlac City houses the main campus of Tarlac State University, as well as other higher educational institutions.

The Tarlac City Schools Division of the Department of Education operates 87 elementary schools and 13 high schools as of 2013.

Some private schools in Tarlac City are the Don Bosco Technical Institute, College of the Holy Spirit, Tarlac Montessori School, Kian Tiak School, Ecumenical Christian College and Creston Academy

== Tourism ==
The Malatarlak Festival, celebrated every January in Tarlac City, is one of the most remarkable festivals in the province. In 2011, the city mayor then changed the name of the festival to Melting Pot Festival, but it is still remembered by its former name. The festival is a commemoration to the first people who built civilization in the province, the Aetas. The names and themes of the festivals in Tarlac City have changed over the years depending on the city's leadership. For the current administration (since July 2016), the local fiesta or festival has been called Kaisa Festival derived from the word magkaisa (to unite).

Tarlac City has two major economic zones that serve as a tourist destination.

== Transportation ==
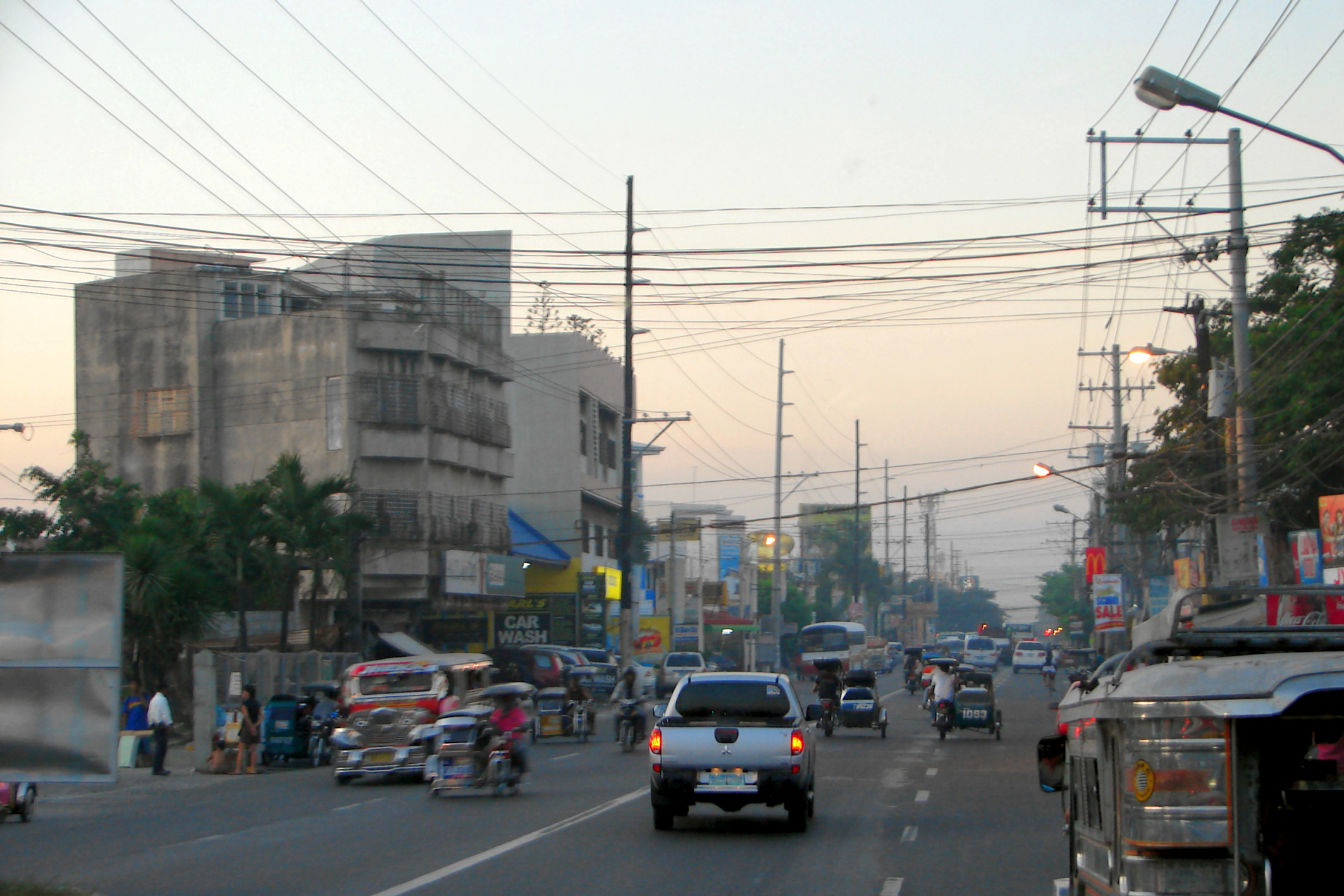
MacArthur Highway in Tarlac

Tarlac City is the usual bus stop for commuters traveling from the South to the Ilocos Region and Cordillera provinces. Bus companies that take a route through the city include Pangasinan Solid North Transit, Inc., Dagupan Bus Company, Philippine Rabbit, Victory Liner, Five Star, First North Luzon Transit, Luzon Cisco Transport, Genesis, Santrans, Viron Transit, Partas, and many others. Many of the bus companies' rest stops can be found along MacArthur Highway including Siesta and Motorway.

The MacArthur Highway goes from the southern to the northern end of the city. There are a series of roads leading to Zambales and Pangasinan as well as Baguio. Most buses passing through the town of Camiling onwards to Pangasinan usually take the Romulo Highway which forks from MacArthur Highway along Barangay San Roque.

Subic–Clark–Tarlac Expressway (SCTEx) connects with Tarlac–Pangasinan–La Union Expressway (TPLEx) and Central Luzon Link Expressway (CLLEx) within the capital of the province. The 3 expressways serves as an alternate route for motorists going to the other parts of Northern Luzon area such as Cagayan Valley, Aurora, Nueva Ecija, Pangasinan, La Union and Baguio while in the Marcos Highway via TPLEX and Kennon Road from McArthur Highway.

== Sister cities ==
- Angeles City
- Cabanatuan
- Taguig
- Baguio
- Bauan, Batangas
