= Camiling =

Municipality in Tarlac, Philippines

- Municipality
- Municipality of Camiling
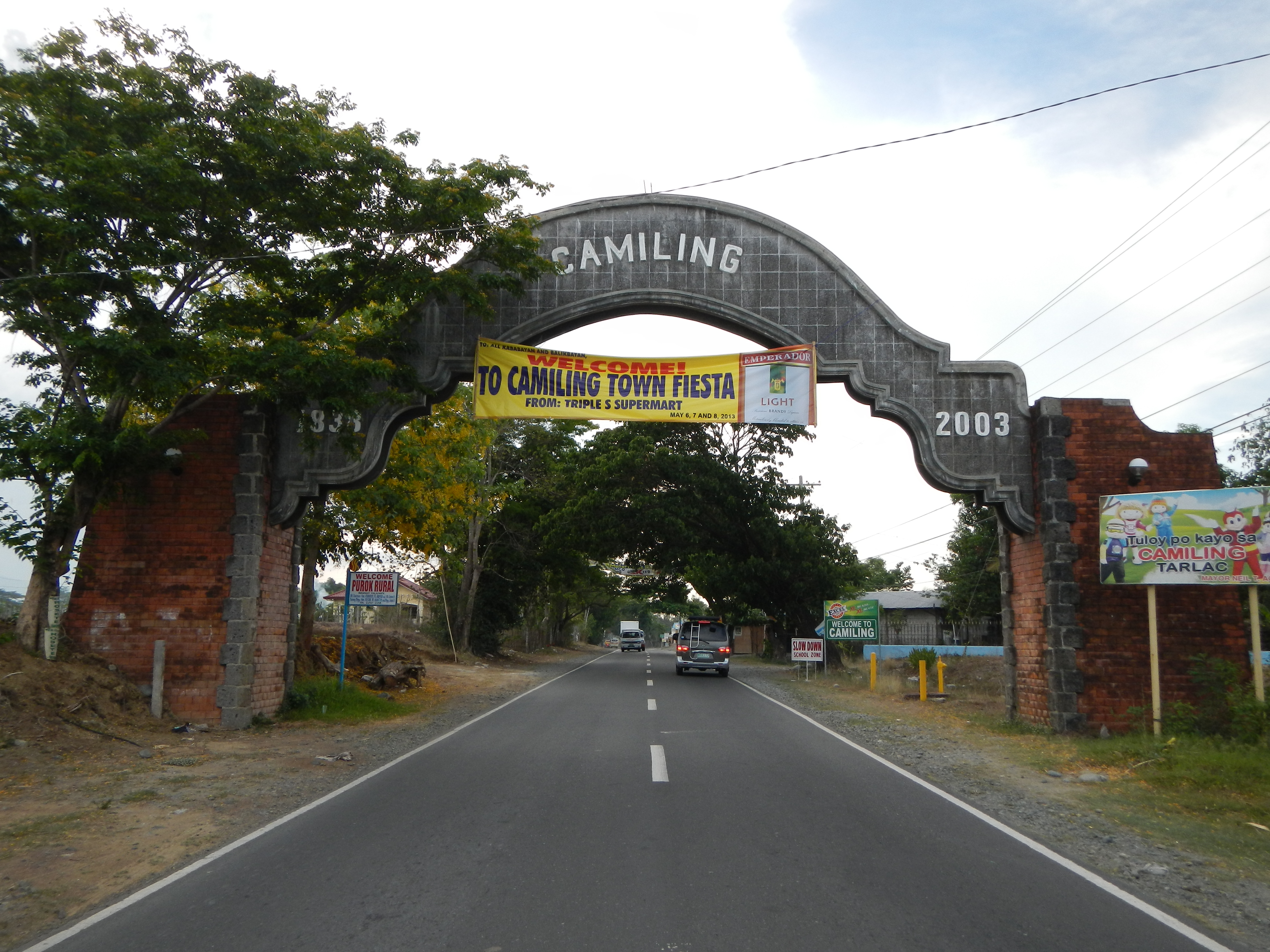
- Welcome Arch

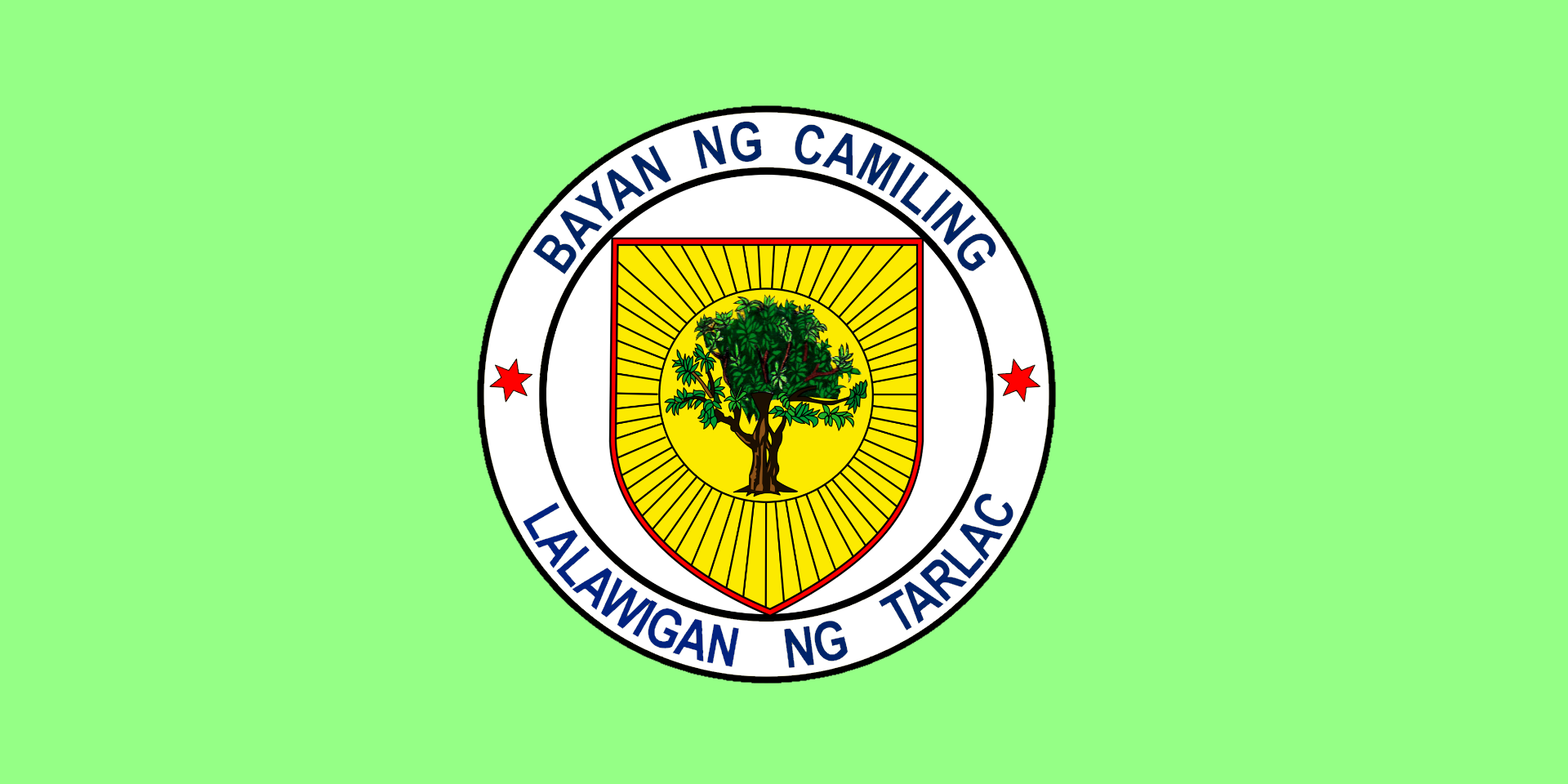
- Flag Seal
- Nickname: Old Lady in the Northwestern Province of Tarlac
- Motto: Camiling Magaling
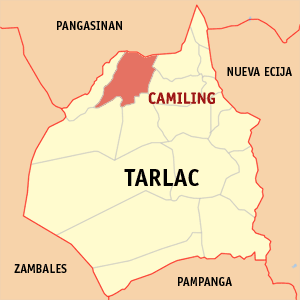
- Map of Tarlac with Camiling highlighted
- Interactive map of Camiling
- Location within the Philippines
- Coordinates: 15°41′12″N 120°24′47″E
- Country: Philippines
- Region: Central Luzon
- Province: Tarlac
- District: 1st district
- Founded: 1838
- Barangays: 61 (see Barangays)

Government
  - Type: Sangguniang Bayan
  - Mayor: Joyce Benitez Agustin
  - Vice Mayor: Gladys T. Agustin
  - Representative: Jaime D. Cojuangco
  - Municipal Council: Members: Patrick Agustin; Albert Cali Jose; Nikko Sintin; Jesus A. Corpuz; Edward Quintos; Rowell Esteban; Terry Pagarigan; Kristine S. Legaspi
  - Electorate: 53,620 voters (2025)

Area
  - Total: 140.53 km^{2} (54.26 sq mi)
- Elevation: 23 m (75 ft)
- Highest elevation: 73 m (240 ft)
- Lowest elevation: 12 m (39 ft)

Population (2024 census)
  - Total: 91,400
  - Density: 650/km^{2} (1,680/sq mi)
  - Households: 22,530

Economy
  - Income class: 1st municipal income class
  - Poverty incidence: 9.62% (2023)
  - Revenue: ₱ 359.8 million (2024)
  - Assets: ₱ 1,125 million (2024)
  - Expenditure: ₱ 340.3 million (2024)
  - Liabilities: ₱ 254.8 million (2024)

Service provider
  - Electricity: Tarlac 1 Electric Cooperative (TARELCO 1)
- Time zone: UTC+8 (PST)
- ZIP code: 2306
- PSGC: 0306903000
- IDD : area code: +63 (0)45
- Native languages: Pangasinan; Ilocano; Tagalog; Kapampangan
- Website: www.camiling-lgu.gov.ph

Camiling, officially the Municipality of Camiling, (Pangasinan: Baley na Camiling; Ilocano: Ili ti Camiling; Tagalog: Bayan ng Camiling), is a municipality in the province of Tarlac in the Philippines. According to the 2024 census, it has a population of 91,400 people.

Camiling is one of the fastest-growing towns of Tarlac when it comes to income, economic activities, and cultural heritage. The town is also dubbed to be the "Old Lady in the Northwestern province of Tarlac", because it is one of the oldest municipalities created by the Spanish government under the province of Pangasinan where it previously included the former barrios of Mayantoc, San Clemente, and Santa Ignacia. The municipality's cultural heritage includes churches, ancestral houses, and ruins. However, the baroque church of Camiling has yet to be restored after 20 years since a fire burned its interior. The inside of the church, one of the only two Spanish churches left in Tarlac, has become a cesspool for human waste, while the facade (front) and buttresses (side supports) have been occupied by business establishments. One buttress has been converted by a business store into a toilet. Heritage advocates and Camiling locals have been campaigning for the restoration of the church after the reports came out in March 2018.

Camiling is the major municipality in north-western Tarlac. It is the commercial center of an area composed of about eight towns, and borders the province of Pangasinan. It is the gateway to central and western Pangasinan through the Romulo Highway (formerly Highway 13). It is also known for its famous "chicharon Camiling" and its green native rice cake called nilubyan.

== History ==
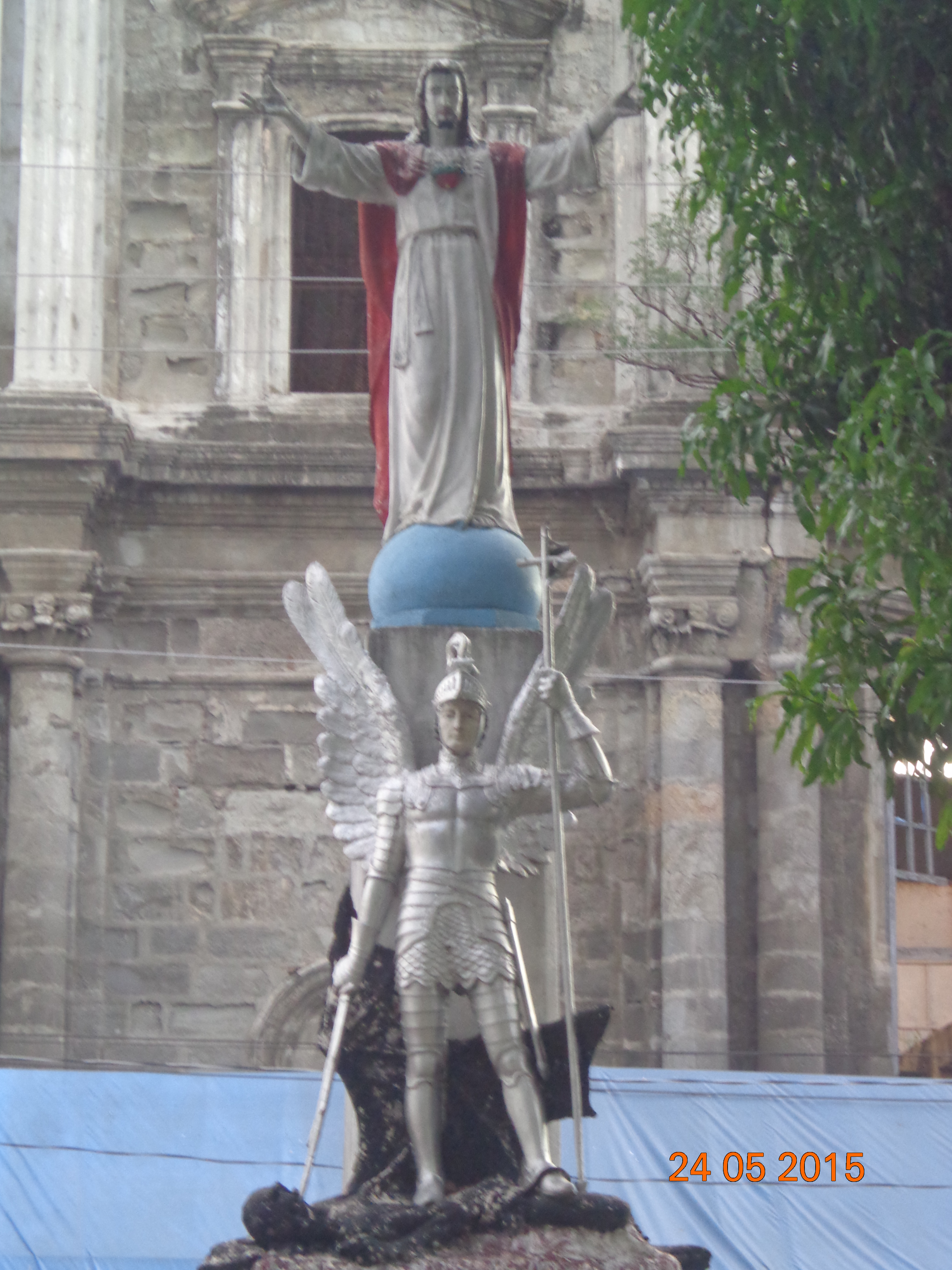
One of the original images of St Michael in the front of the ruined church in Camiling

Camiling began its history as a settlement located near the Camiling River.

During the classical era, the area used to be lush in tropical rainforest and was used mainly by the local Pangasinense people. When the polity of Caboloan was established in 1406, the area was incorporated as part of the kingdom. It was ruled by a series of native huangs (kings/queens), namely, Urduja, Kamayin, Taymey, and Liyu. Majority of its rulers are unnamed as no document of them were properly recorded. For a short period, an emperor in China became an honorary ruler as well.

In 1575, the Chinese pirate Limahong attacked the polity and declared himself as ruler of the Caboloan realms. The kingdom was eventually abolished in 1576, when the Spanish attacked and ransacked the kingdom's capital of Binalatongan (present-day San Carlos, Pangasinan). It was later on incorporated into the Spanish Empire.

Early in the 18th century, the community was a sitio of Paniqui; before and after, Paniqui was also part of Bayambang. The town's name is derived from "camiring" or "camiling", the Pangasinan name for the Semecarpus cuneiformis tree, which at that time grew abundantly in the wilderness.

The community was originally a vast area of Cogon growth interposed with thick forestalls areas stretching into the Zambales mountain ranges. A wide river cut through it. The early inhabitants of the place were the Aetas who make a living by gathering fruit from fruit trees, hunting, and fishing. With the coming first of the Pangasinenses and later the Ilocanos from the north, the Aetas who used to roam freely in the wilderness obliged themselves to move into the interior.

The new settlers first occupied the swampy land, now known as "Cacamilingan" on the right side of the river. In time, these settlers began moving to the left opposite shore because of more frequent disastrous floods. To this new location, the residents therein built a small church with Saint Michael as the patron saint.

Camiling became a District Commission from 1834 to 1837 founded by Don Francisco Soriano, the then Cabeza de Barangay who became the town's first District Commissioner. In 1838, Camiling became an independent town, formally separated from the mother town of Paniqui and with Don Vicente Galsim, as the first Gobernadorcillo. Thirty-eight others followed him. Don Jose Sabado, the last to serve under the Spanish regime and the first Presidente Municipal under the Revolutionary Government by Aguinaldo.

Camiling was a first-class municipality during the 1970s but was reclassified when the Local Government Code went into effect in the early 1990s. It became again a first-class municipality again on November 20, 2001, by virtue of the Latest Income Class Classification (L.I.C.C.) initiated by the Department of Finance; the Local Government Unit of Camiling was reclassified from a second class municipality to a first-class municipality, having attained an annual income of 50,942,508.51 pesos. In 2008, Camiling's income was more than 72,463,893,00 pesos with average growth of more than 5.164% per year (2001–2008).

=== Cultural representations ===
The town of San Diego in Jose Rizal's 1887 novel, Noli Me Tángere, is the municipality of Camiling in real life. The old Saint Michael the Archangel Parish Church of Camiling and Leonor Rivera were all real-life inspiration to the novel.

== Geography ==
Camiling is 160 kilometres (99 mi) north-north-west of Manila, 36 kilometres (22 mi) from provincial capital Tarlac City, and 19 kilometres (12 mi) from Paniqui.

It borders San Clemente to the west, Bayambang to the north, Santa Ignacia and Mayantoc to the south, and Paniqui and Moncada to the east.

Mostly of plain topography but some parts are hilly to mountainous in which the barangays of Papaac, Bacsay, Birbira and Cayasan, to name a few. The deeper part of the mountains can be described as a place where wild animals live, such as deer, Toddy cat (Musang), wild boar (baboy ramo), monitor lizard (bayawak).

=== Barangays ===
Camiling is politically subdivided into 61 barangays, as shown below. Each barangay consists of puroks and some have sitios.

It has the most barangays in all of the municipalities of Tarlac while the city of Tarlac has 76 barangays.

- Anoling 1st
- Anoling 2nd
- Anoling 3rd
- Bacabac
- Bacsay
- Bancay 1st
- Bilad
- Birbira
- Bobon 1st Casarratan
- Bobon 2nd
- Bobon Caarosipan
- Cabanabaan
- Cacamilingan Norte (with Kipping village)
- Cacamilingan Sur
- Caniag
- Carael
- Cayaoan
- Cayasan
- Florida
- Lasong
- Libueg (with sitio Pugo)
- Malacampa (With sitio Cacelestinuan and Sitio Camartinisan)
- Manaquem
- Manupeg
- Marawi
- Matubog
- Nagrambacan
- Nagserialan
- Palimbo Proper
- Palimbo Caarosipan
- Pao 1st
- Pao 2nd
- Pao 3rd
- Papaac
- Pindangan 1st
- Pindangan 2nd
- Poblacion A
- Poblacion B
- Poblacion C
- Poblacion D
- Poblacion E
- Poblacion F
- Poblacion G
- Poblacion H
- Poblacion I
- Poblacion J
- San Isidro (Bancay 2nd)
- Santa Maria
- Sawat
- Sinilian 1st (with Sitio Cabalaongan and Nangalisan)
- Sinilian 2nd (with Sitio Puyaoan)
- Sinilian 3rd (Northern, Bitawa, Centro)
- Sinilian Cacalibosoan (with Sitio Barikir)
- Sinulatan 1st
- Sinulatan 2nd
- Surgui 1st
- Surgui 2nd
- Surgui 3rd
- Tambugan
- Telbang
- Tuec

=== Climate ===
Climate data for Camiling, Tarlac
Month	Jan	Feb	Mar	Apr	May	Jun	Jul	Aug	Sep	Oct	Nov	Dec	Year
Mean daily maximum °C (°F)	31 (88)	32 (90)	34 (93)	36 (97)	35 (95)	33 (91)	32 (90)	31 (88)	31 (88)	32 (90)	32 (90)	31 (88)	33 (91)
Mean daily minimum °C (°F)	22 (72)	22 (72)	24 (75)	25 (77)	26 (79)	25 (77)	25 (77)	25 (77)	25 (77)	24 (75)	24 (75)	23 (73)	24 (76)
Average precipitation mm (inches)	16 (0.6)	17 (0.7)	24 (0.9)	32 (1.3)	181 (7.1)	233 (9.2)	354 (13.9)	356 (14.0)	308 (12.1)	168 (6.6)	66 (2.6)	52 (2.0)	1,807 (71)
Average rainy days	4.9	4.4	8.0	12.9	24.3	27.8	30.1	30.2	29.0	21.6	12.1	9.4	214.7
Source: Meteoblue (Use with caution: this is modeled/calculated data, not measured locally.)

== Demographics ==
Population census of Camiling
Year	Pop.	±% p.a.
1903	25,243	—
1918	23,375	−0.51%
1939	25,824	+0.48%
1948	33,935	+3.08%
1960	40,536	+1.49%
1970	49,156	+1.94%
1975	52,411	+1.29%
1980	53,860	+0.55%
1990	62,773	+1.54%
1995	65,340	+0.75%
2000	71,598	+1.98%
2007	79,941	+1.53%
2010	80,241	+0.14%
2015	83,248	+0.70%
2020	87,319	+1.01%
2024	91,400	+1.10%
Source: Philippine Statistics Authority

In the 2024 census, the population of Camiling was 91,400 people, with a density of 620 inhabitants per square kilometre or 1,600 inhabitants per square mile.

=== Language ===
Ilocano and Pangasinan are the main regional languages of Camiling. Kapampangan and Tagalog are also widely understood and spoken.

== Economy ==
Poverty incidence of Camiling (%)

Source: Philippine Statistics Authority

=== Industries and produce ===
Aside from rice cakes and chicharon, the municipality is also known for its freshwater fish produce, like tilapia; dalag (or mudfish, Channa striata); catfish, including the native hito, Clarias macrocephalus; and bangús, the milkfish.

== Tourism ==
=== Attractions ===
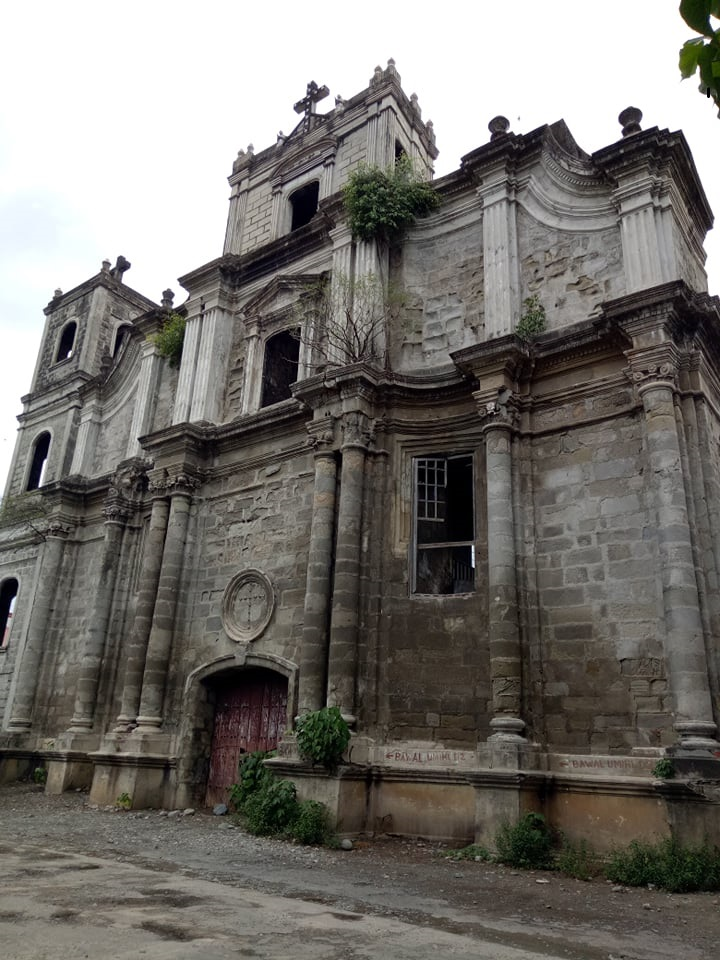
The Old St Michael the Archangel Parish Church which was gutted by fire in 1997

- The Old St Michael the Archangel Parish Church: A historical building built around the 18th century. It was also the oldest religious structure built in the province of Tarlac. The antique edifice also features the ruins of a Spanish style school which is created for sanctification like the St Michael Parish Church Garden and the St Michael Meditation Sanctuary. This church is also the largest in the entire province. Michael the Archangel, the patron saint of Camiling is said to have performed miracles in the Phillipnes. During the War, He was said to have saved the lives of many Filipinos who suffered at the hands of the Japanese. The old church was declared by the National Historic Commission as a historic site until it was gutted by a fire in 1997. The baroque church has yet to be restored after 20 years since a fire burned its interior. The facade (front) and buttresses (side supports) have been occupied by business establishments. One buttress has been converted by a business store into a toilet. Heritage advocates and Camiling locals have been campaigning for the restoration of the church since March 2018.
- Maria Clara Iglesias Independiente: Built after the Philippine revolution by revolutionaries attempting to "Filipinize" the Church. This is the second church built by Gregorio Aglipay, the first one being in Paniqui.
- Maria Clara Museum: A part of the mansion where Leonor Rivera lived. Several priceless artifacts belonging to her, immortalized by Noli Me Tángere as María Clara and even her late admirer, the Philippine National Hero, José Rizal's old photos is being exhibited on glass.
- The New St Michael the Archangel Parish Church: St Michael the Archangel Parish Church of Camiling was built in 2009. With a total floor area of 2,200 square meters, the church features intricately designed stained glass windows depicting, aside from Jesus Christ and the Virgin Mary, the angels. It is adjacent to Camiling's Catholic school.

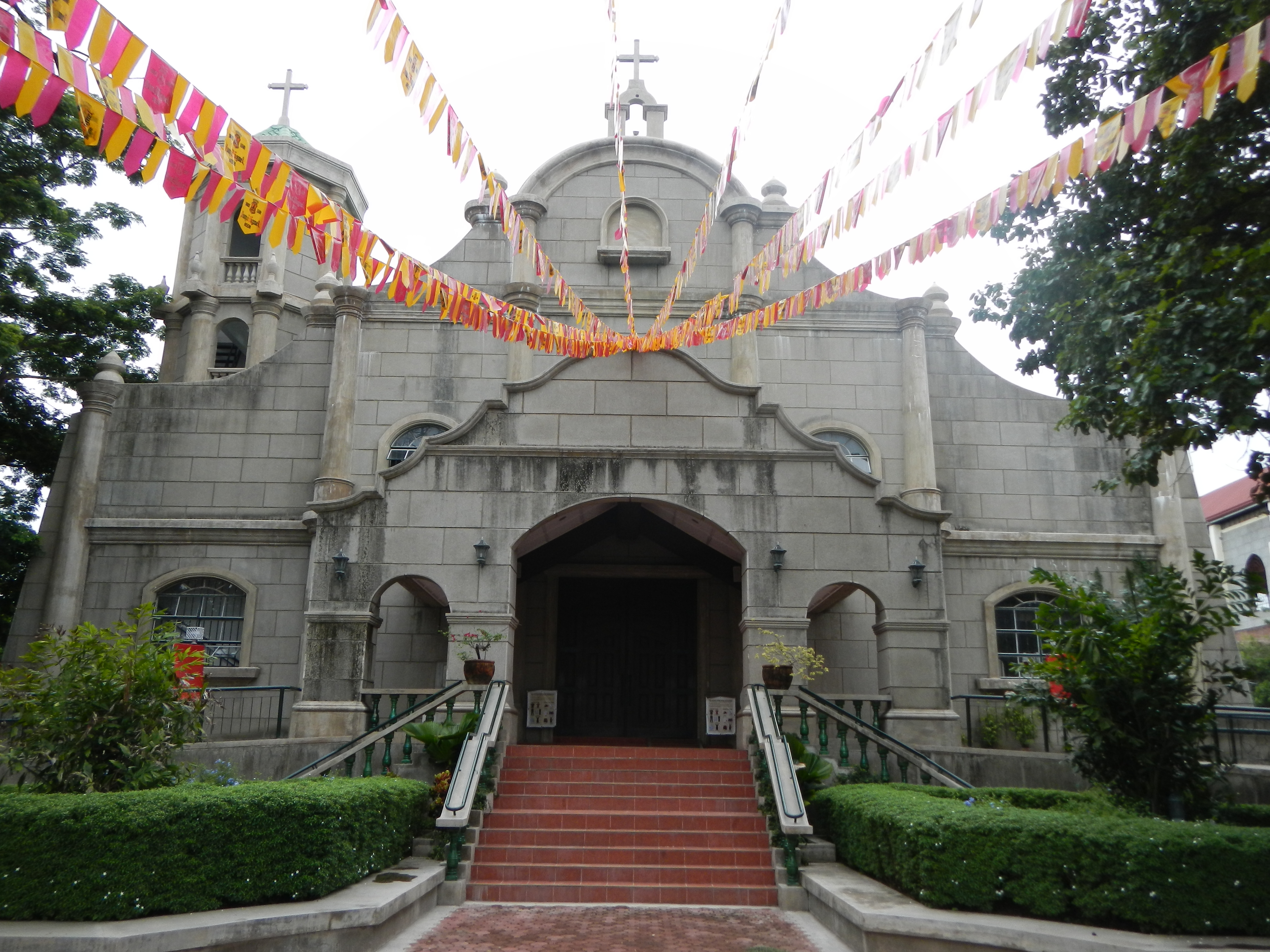
The New St Michael the Archangel Parish Church

- The Old Site of Camiling: Also known as the Old Intramuros of Tarlac. This place showcases the combined ruins of the old St Michael the Archangel Parish Church together with its school extension and convent which burned down in 1997.

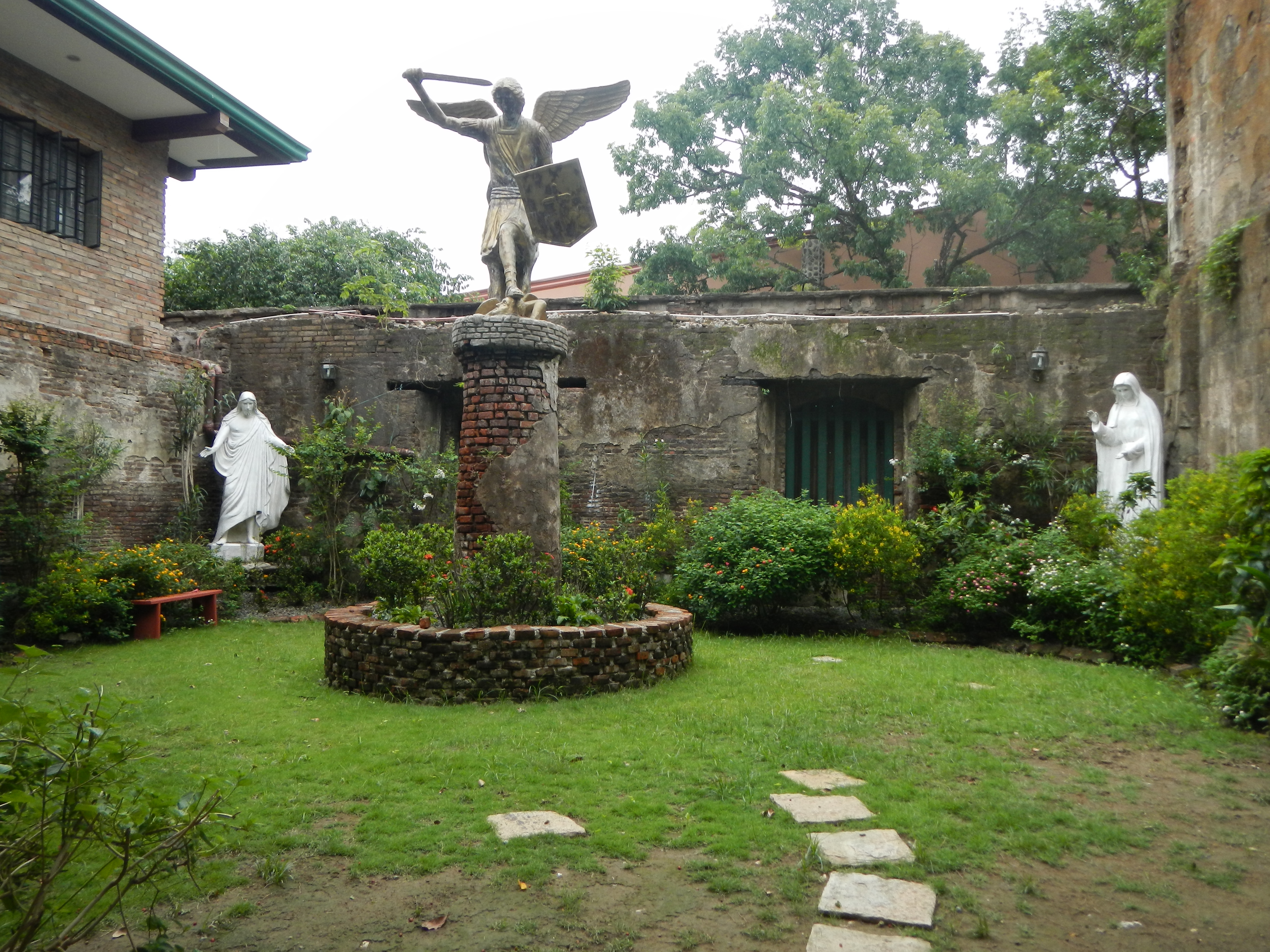
The Old site of Camiling's Meditation Garden is best visited during recollection and visita Iglesia

- Our Lady of Guadalupe Church: A parish church that features the Guadalupe title of Blessed Virgin Mary. It is located in Brgy. Malacampa
- Maria Clara Town Plaza: The municipal plaza of Camiling which features different cultural heritages and interesting contribution of Camiling to Philippine history. It includes the Camiling Veterans Park, Maria Clara Auditorium, the "camiring tree" (from which the town of Camiling got its name), the tower clock, the Grotto of Our Lady of Lourdes, and the statue of General Paulino Santos.
- Mt. Damas is a crag which is one of the favorite destination of hikers and mountain climbers in the province. As part of the Zambales Mountain Range lies a cave which serve as a shelter and hideout of many people and soldiers (guerillas) of Camiling against the Japanese during the war.
- Ubod Falls is a 160-foot waterfall in Mt. Damas in Papaac. It is considered the highest falls in the entire province of Tarlac. It is located deep in the wilderness of barangay Papaac.
- Pias Falls has greater water power than Ubod Falls despite being much smaller.

== Festivals ==
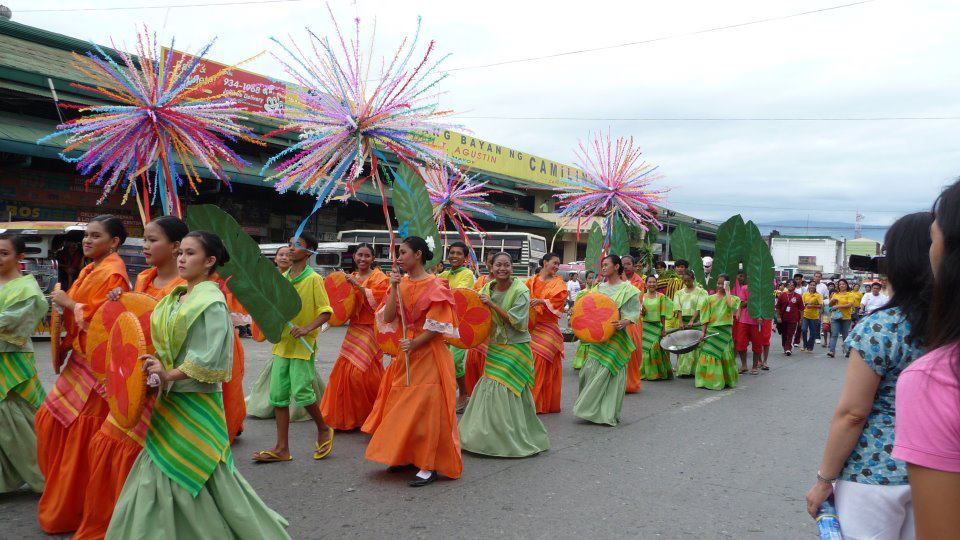
street dancers of the 2008 chicharon - iniruban festival

Camiling's "one town, one product" is the bagnet (also called chicharon by the Ilocano people of Ilocos Sur) and the sweet green native cakes called iniruban or dirimin of Pangasinan origin. The municipality is also known for other native rice cakes such as tupig, pinais, and patupat. Established in 2000, the festival includes colorful and artistic presentations and a street dancing competition amongst the different schools in Camiling.

== Government ==
=== Elected officials ===
Municipal Officials (2025–2028):

Position	Name	Party
Mayor	Joyce B. Agustin	Nationalist People's Coalition
Vice Mayor	Gladys T. Agustin	Nationalist People's Coalition
Sangguniang Bayan Members	Patrick R. Agustin	Nationalist People's Coalition
Sangguniang Bayan Members	Albert B. Jose	Nationalist People's Coalition
Sangguniang Bayan Members	Nicole Alexis S. Sintin	Nationalist People's Coalition
Sangguniang Bayan Members	Jesus A. Corpuz	Nationalist People's Coalition
Sangguniang Bayan Members	Edward H. Quintos	Nationalist People's Coalition
Sangguniang Bayan Members	Rowel B. Esteban	Partido Federal ng Pilipinas
Sangguniang Bayan Members	Terry L. Pagarigan	Nationalist People's Coalition
Sangguniang Bayan Members	Kristine Anne S. Legaspi	Nationalist People's Coalition
Ex-Officio Members
ABC President	Enric C. Agustin	
SK President [Ex-Officio Provincial Board Member]	Luke Corinth Q. Pagarigan	
SK Vice-President [Ex-Officio Municipal Councilor]	Argel Garcillano	

== Healthcare ==
Camiling has three hospitals and a health center at the Municipal Hall. The health center serves the poor by giving free medicines and other health service. There are numerous private clinics scattered throughout the town. Hospitals in Camiling are Señor Sto. Niħo Tertiary Hospital at Poblacion, Camiling District Hospital at Malacampa, and Salvador General Hospital at Palimbo.

== Education ==
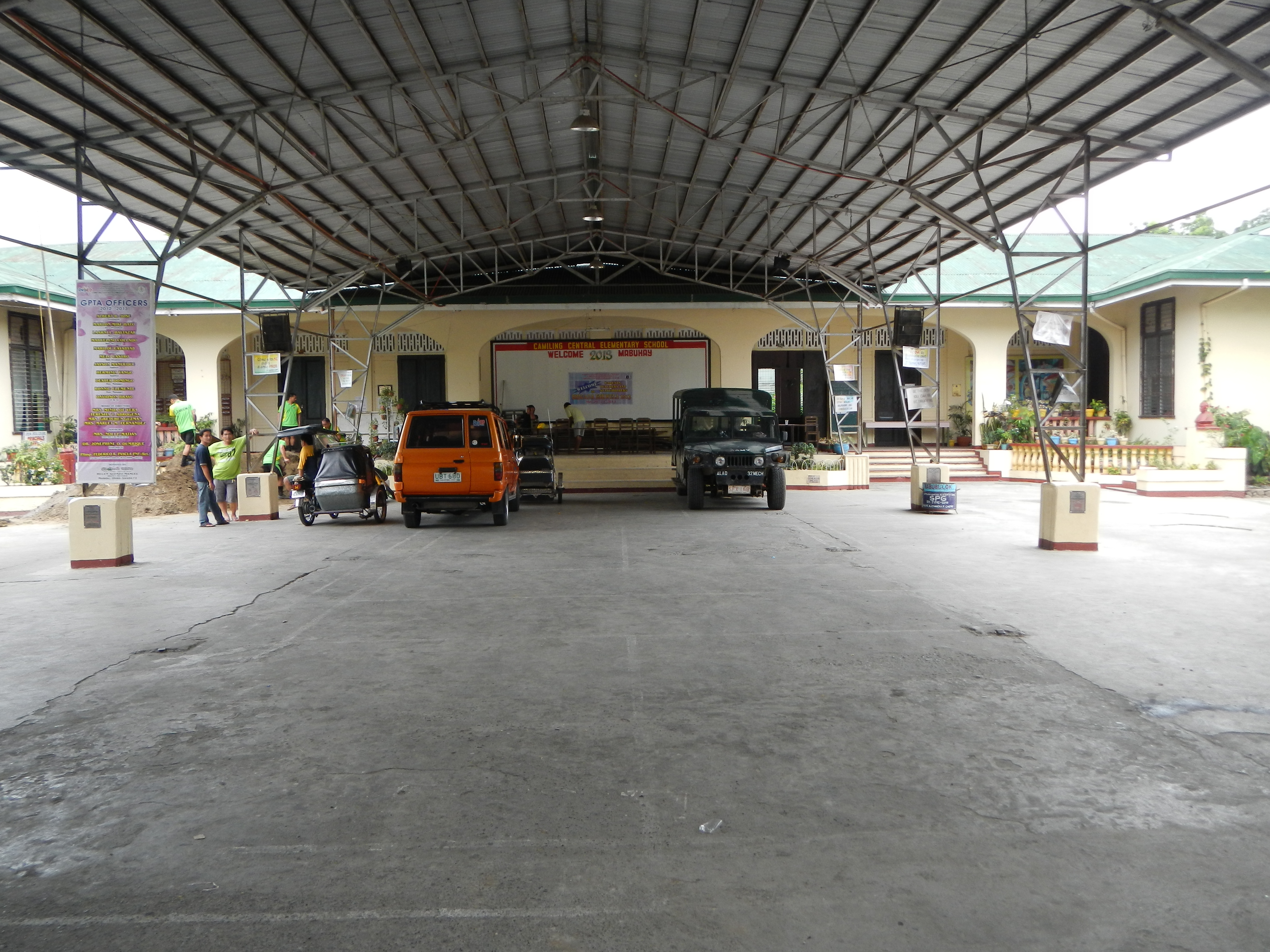
Camiling Central Elementary School

There are three schools district offices which govern all educational institutions within the municipality. They oversee the management and operations of all private and public, from primary to secondary schools. These are Camiling Central Schools District Office, Camiling East Schools District Office, and Camiling West Schools District Office.

=== Primary and elementary schools ===
- Anoling Elementary School
- Asian Lexcon School
- Bacabac Elementary School
- Bacsay Elementary School
- Bancay I Elementary School
- Bilad Elementary School
- Bilad Elementary School (Annex)
- Birbira Elementary School
- Bobon 1st-Palimbo Proper Elementary School
- Bobon 2nd Elementary School
- Cabanabaan Primary School
- Camiling Adventist Multigrade School
- Camiling Catholic School
- Camiling Central Elementary School
- Camiling East Elementary School
- Camiling North Elementary School
- Camiling West Central Elementary School
- Camiling United Methodist Church
- Caniag Elementary School
- Carael Elementary School
- Cayaoan Elementary School
- Cayasan Elementary School
- Florida Elementary School
- Goodshephered Shekinah School
- Lasong Elementary School
- Libueg Elementary School
- Malacampa Elementary School
- Malacampa Elementary School (Annex)
- Manaquem Elementary School
- Marawi Elementary School
- Matubog Elementary School
- Pao Elementary School
- Papaac Elementary School
- Pindangan 1st Elementary School
- Pindangan 2nd Elementary School
- Saint Rose Academy
- San Isidro Elementary School
- Santa Maria Elementary School
- Sawat Elementary School
- Sinilian I Elementary School
- Sinilian II Elementary School
- Sinilian III Elementary School
- Sinulatan Elementary School
- Surgui Elementary School
- Tambugan Elementary School
- Telbang Primary School
- Tuec Elementary School

=== Secondary schools ===
- Bilad High School
- Birbira High School
- Camiling Catholic School, Inc.
- Camiling School of Home Industries
- Malacampa National High School
- Marawi High School

=== Vocational school ===
- Kasangga Security Development and Training Institute

=== Higher educational institutions ===
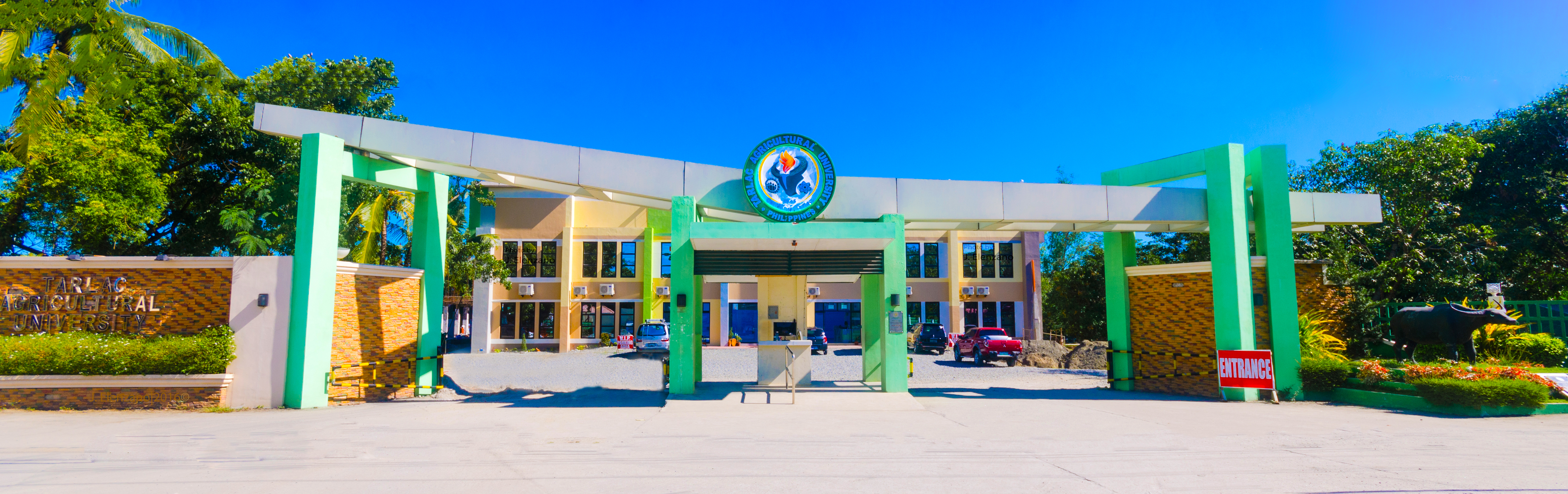
the panoramic view of the tarlac agricultural university facade

- BESTCAP Career College - Founded in 1998. Active member of California Education Association, TAPSA, APSTaP and MTG Philippines. It is also accredited to use Dunn and Dunn Learning Styles and Assessment. It is located at Malacampa, Camiling.
- Camiling Colleges: Founded by Gilberto Romulo since 1945, the brother of the Former UN President Carlos P. Romulo. It has several professional courses such as Education, Information Technology, Computer Programming. It is also known for its vocational courses such as Office Management, Practical Electricity, Nursing Aide, Practical Electricity and Nursing. It is located at Gomez Street, Poblacion B, Camiling.
- Saint Paul College of Technology - A branch of Christian college serving central Luzon, particularly in Camiling. It is famous for its great contribution in vocational courses particularly HRM or Hotel Resource Management. It is located at Quezon Avenue, Camiling.
- Tarlac Agricultural University - Founded in 1945, the second largest college in the province of Tarlac that offers bachelor's, master's, and doctorate degrees and curriculum based on agriculture and now offers industry-based courses. It is the largest college in Tarlac in land area. Main campus is located at Malacampa, Camiling. The college state is also known for its kamote wine and other vegetables and fruits use in food processing.
- Tarlac Agricultural University(Laboratory School) - TAU-LS is an extension of the TAU-College for Secondary Education. Entrance exams are requirements for enrollment.
- United school of Science and Technology (USST): It is newly established since 2009 as branch of United School of Science and Technology at the City of Tarlac and the first university in Tarlac Province. It is located at Cacamilingan Norte, Camiling.

== Notable people ==
- Alberto Romulo - former Foreign Secretary, Senator and Executive Secretary.
- Alfonso G. Pablo Sr. - a retired ordained Filipino Wesleyan clergyman who was General Superintendent of the Wesleyan Church of the Philippines from 1989 to 2005, and was the chairman of the International Conference of The Wesleyan Church for four years from 2000.
- Carlos P. Romulo - former UN President and Foreign Affairs Secretary.
- César Bengzon - former Chief Justice of the Supreme Court of the Philippines and first Filipino Justice of the International Court of Justice.
- Gregorio C. Brillantes - National Artist of the Philippines for Literature
- Jing Abalos - A 1960's Philippine actor.
- Leonor Rivera - José Rizal's second cousin and love interest well known as Maria Clara.
- Onofre Corpuz - former President of the University of the Philippines and Secretary of Education, Culture and Sports (now DepEd).
- Paulino Santos - Founder of Penal Colonies and Chief of Staff of The Philippine Army. General Santos is named after him.

== Sister city ==
- Juneau, Alaska, United States

== Gallery ==
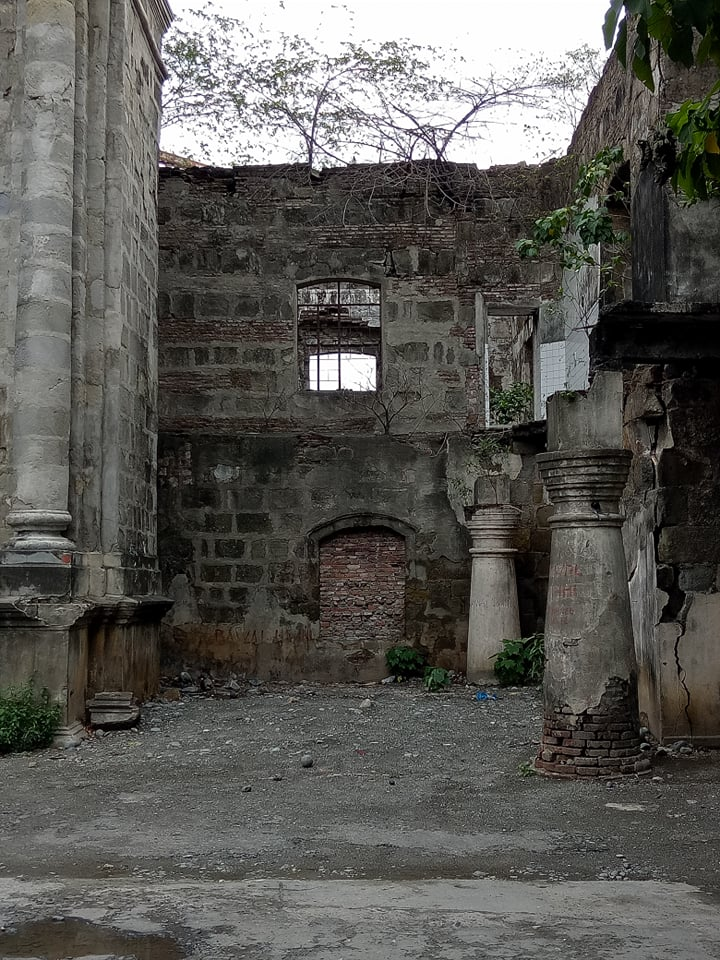
The Old Site of Camiling or commonly known as the Intramuros of Tarlac

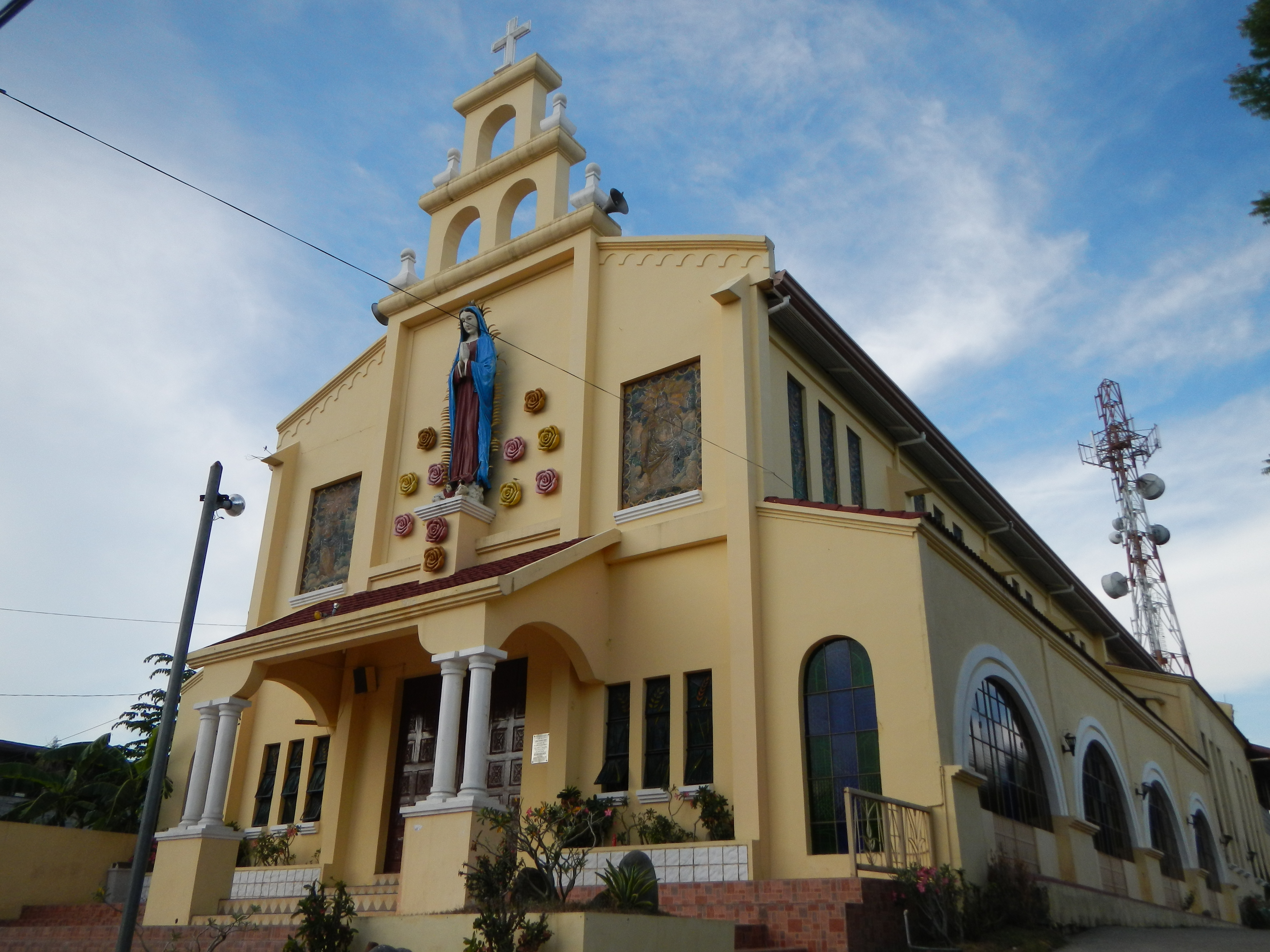
Our Lady of Guadalupe Church

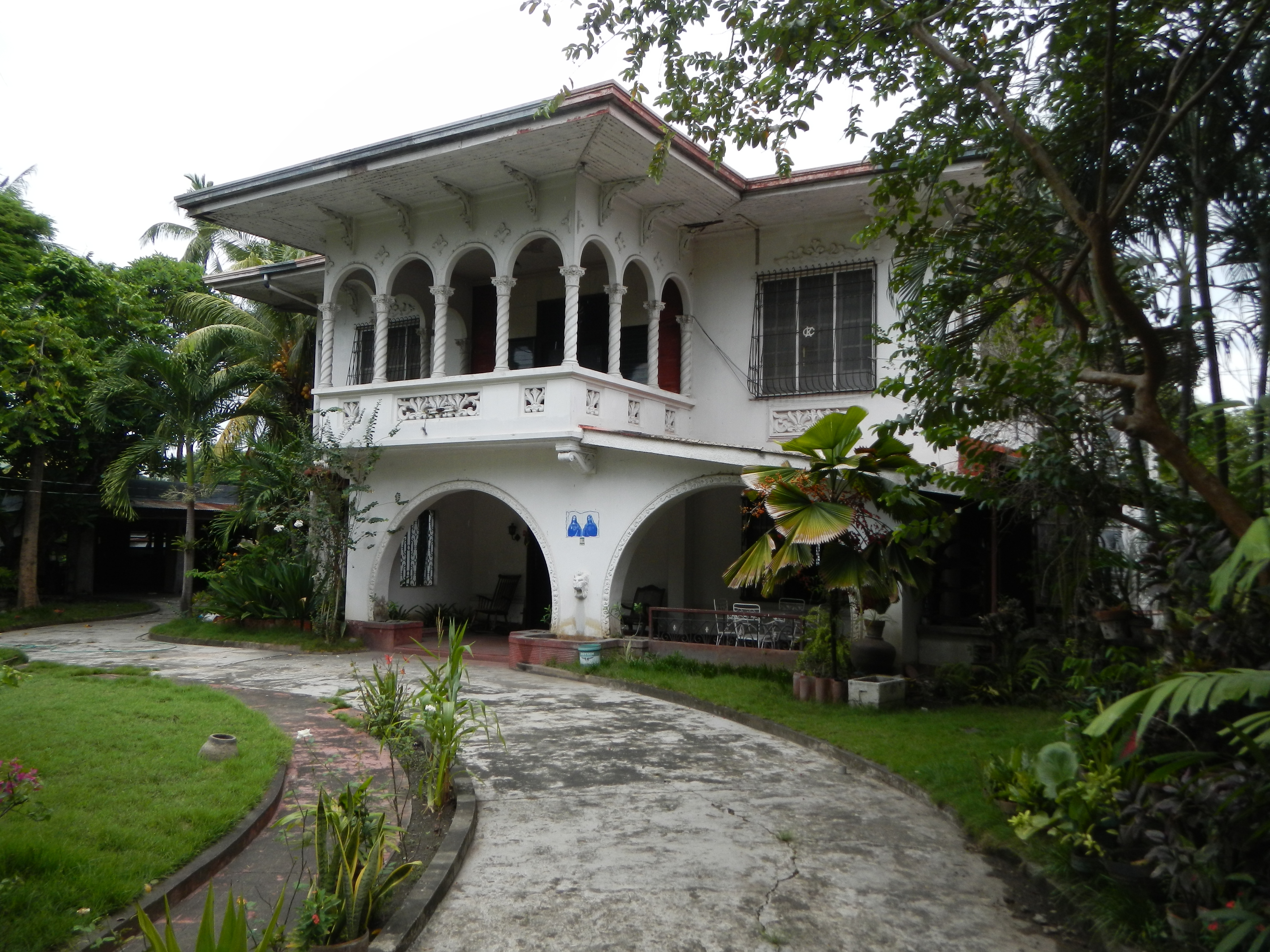
Leonor Rivera Estate

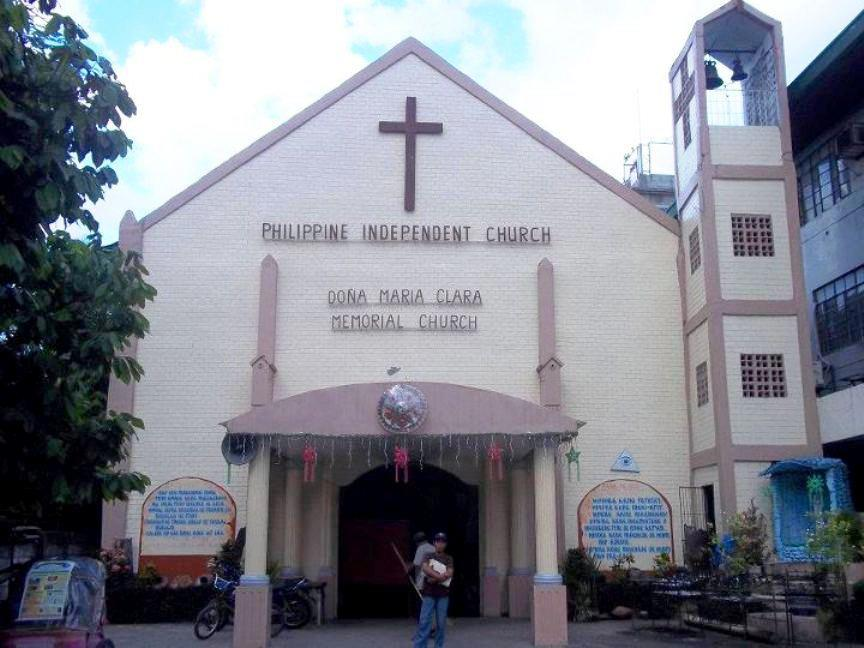
Cathedral of St. Michael the Archangel, Doña Maria Clara Memorial Church, Camiling, Tarlac.

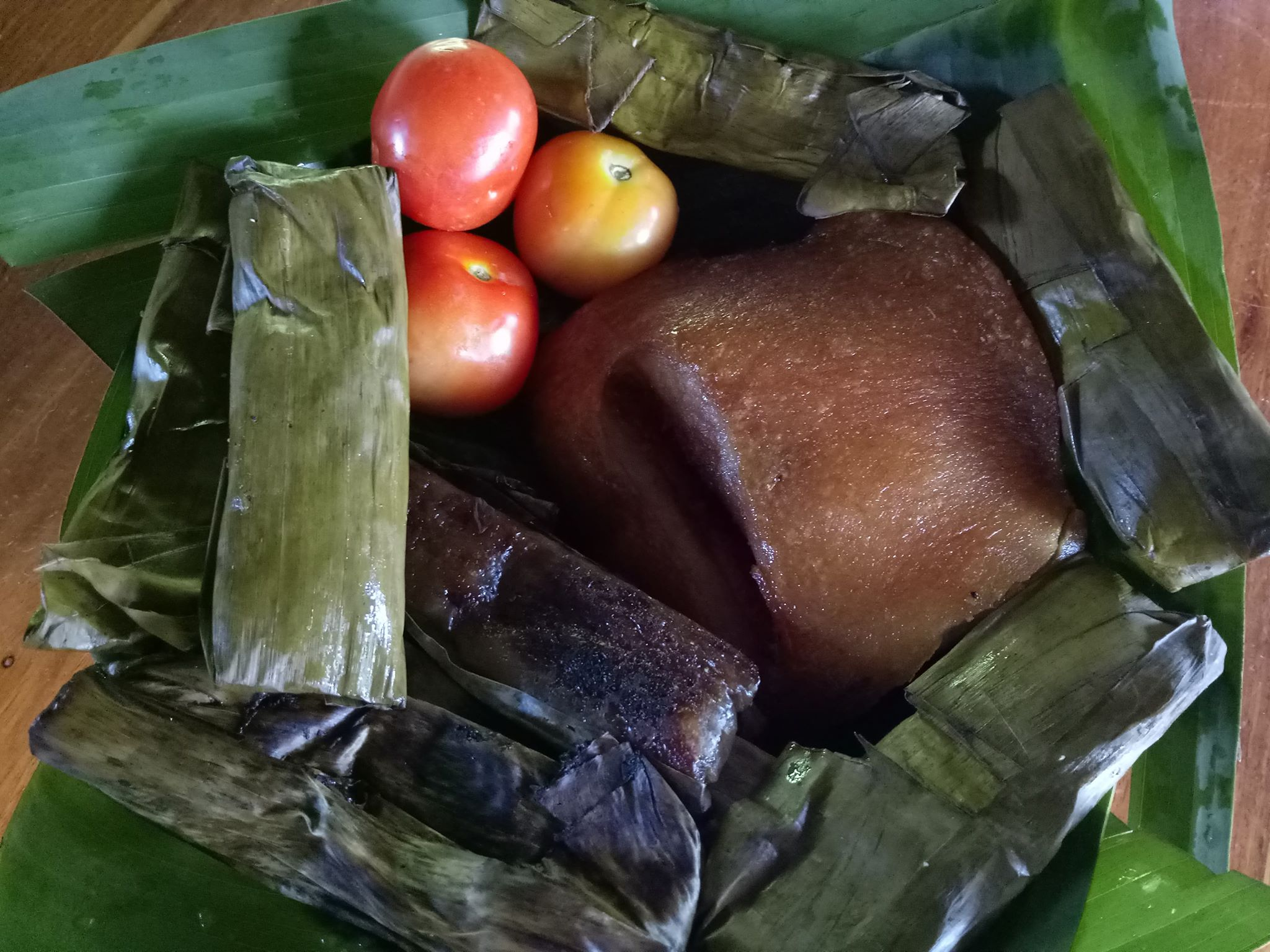
Chicharon Camiling with freshly picked tomatoes surrounded by Tupig, and Pinais, native delicacies.

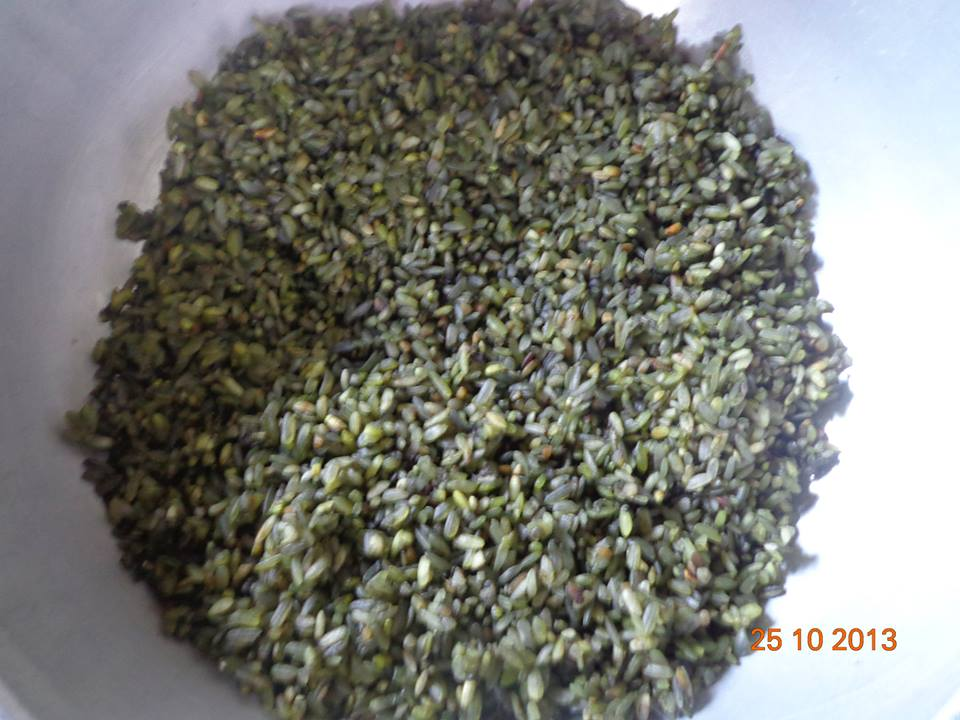
The green rice they called Iniruban
