= Pangasinan (historical region) =

Major historical region in Central and Northern Luzon

- before 1406–1572
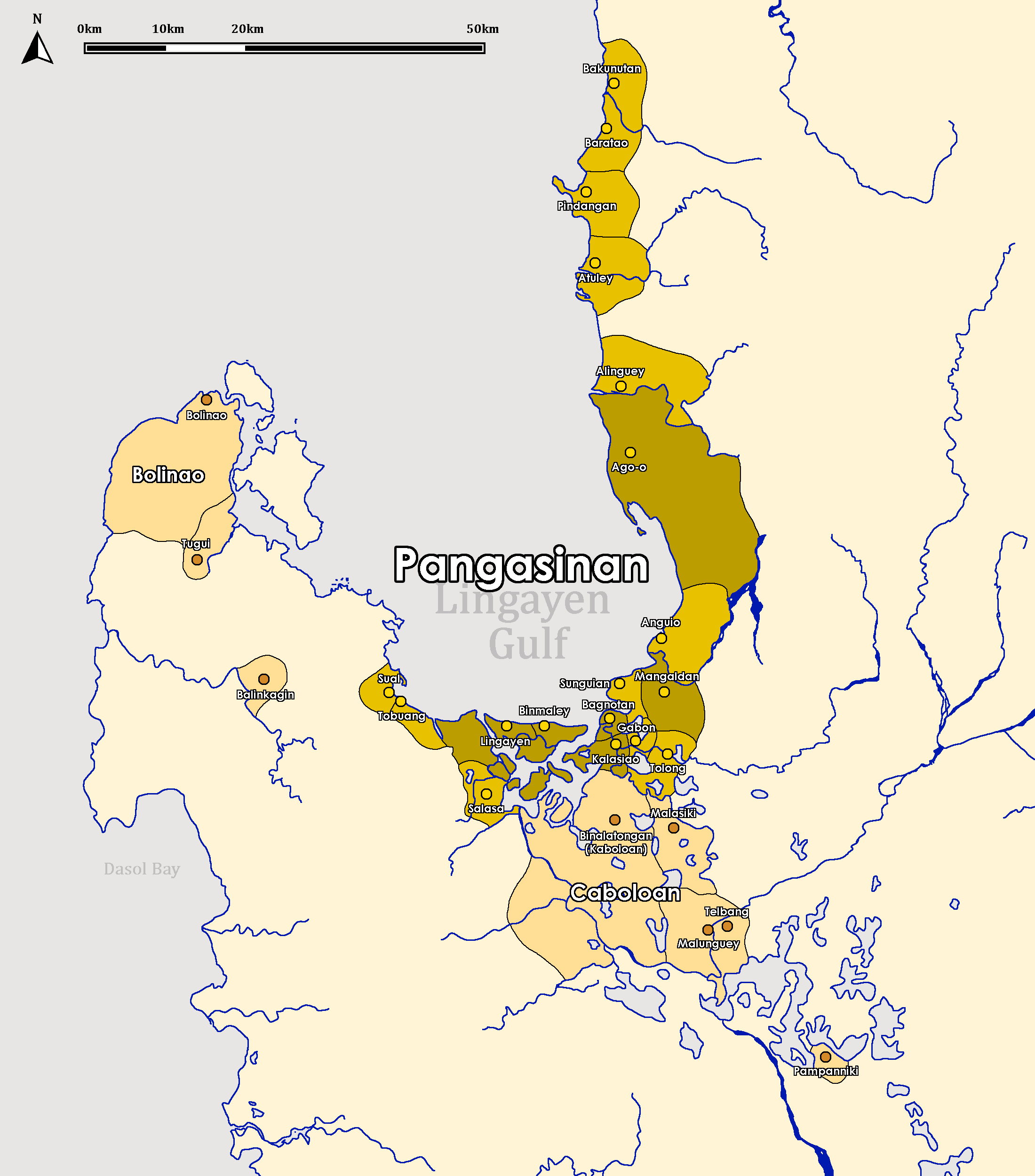
- A map of the Pangasinan region with its principal settlements (dark yellow) and associate settlements (yellow) during the 15th-16th centuries.
- Common languages: Pangasinan and other Northern Luzon languages
- Religion: Buddhism, Hinduism, Animism and folk religion
- Government: Chiefdom
- History
  - Established: before 1406
  - Spanish conquest of Pangasinan: 1572
- Currency: Silver, barter
Succeeded by
Captaincy General of the Philippines; Pangasinan
- Today part of: Philippines

Pangasinan was a coastal pre-colonial Philippine region located at the coasts of Lingayen Gulf. South of Pangasinan was Caboloan (Luyag na Caboloan), located in the interior of Central Luzon, beside the Agno River basin.

== Etymology ==
The term "Pangasinan" is toponymic, as it derives from the root word 'asin' (salt) with the prefix 'pang-' or 'panag-a' and suffix '-an', denoting place. Therefore, Panag-aasinan or Pangasinan meant "land of salt", suggesting that Pangasinan was a coastal region with a salt industry. Pangasinan was also referred by the natives as "luyag ed dapit-baybay" (place near the coast).

Pangasinan was referred to in contemporary Chinese records as 「馮嘉施蘭」 (Hokkien Pe̍h-ōe-jī: Pâng-ka-si-lân; Mandarin pinyin: Féngjiāshīlán; Wade–Giles: Fêng^{²}-chia^{¹}-shih^{¹}-lan^{²}), historically atonally romanized by 20th century authors in Mandarin using the Wade-Giles system as "Feng-chia-hsi-lan", even though premodern Chinese texts in the Philippines from before the 20th century were written in Classical Chinese (Hokkien Chinese: 漢文; Pe̍h-ōe-jī: Hàn-bûn) composed and meant to be read from a Hokkien perspective.

== History ==
=== Territory ===
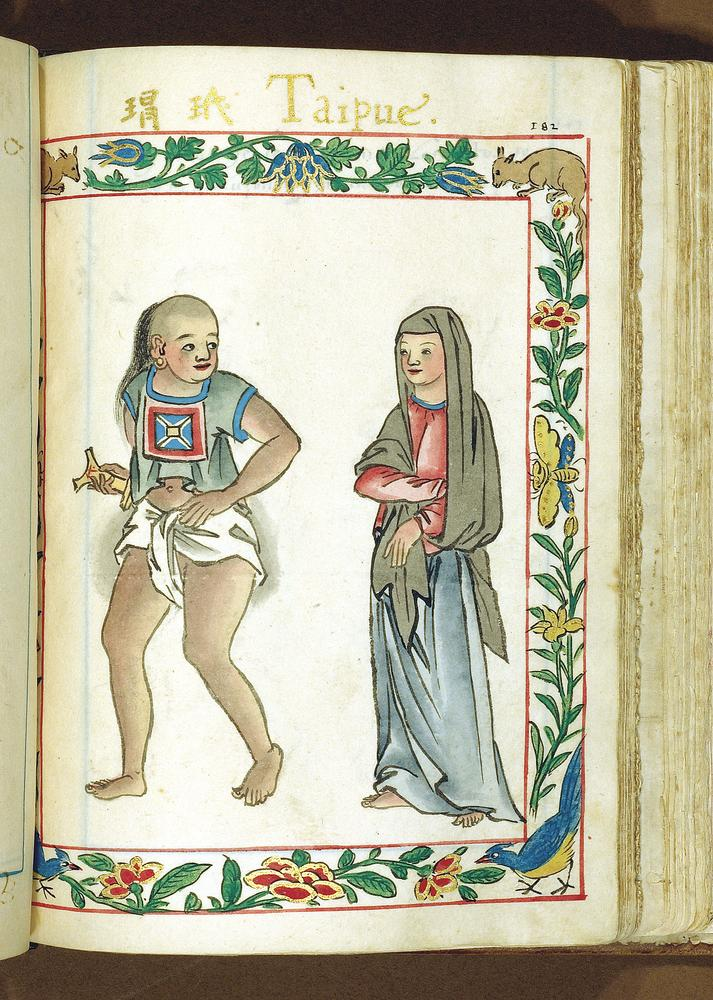
Possible inhabitants of Pangasinan with kampilan sword, depicted in the Boxer Codex (1590) surmised to come from Taimei Anchorage, Lingayen Gulf, Luzon

Pangasinan's territory occupied the entirety of the coasts of Lingayen Gulf, spanning from near Bolinao in Zambales to Balaoan in La Union. Due to Bolinao's proximity with the rest of Pangasinan, Miguel de Loarca assumed that the people of Bolinao and the rest of Pangasinan spoke the same language. Ancient potteries were also found in Bolinao during the precolonial period, suggesting active trade with China. Agoo, the most prosperous port of Pangasinan, engaged in frequent trade with the Igorots in exchange for their gold. The Igorots then received carabaos and pigs which they took back to the mountains. This prosperity attracted many traders from Japan, eventually earning the name "Port of Japan". There were several chiefs who also ruled in Calasiao, Lingayen and Binmaley.

=== Culture ===
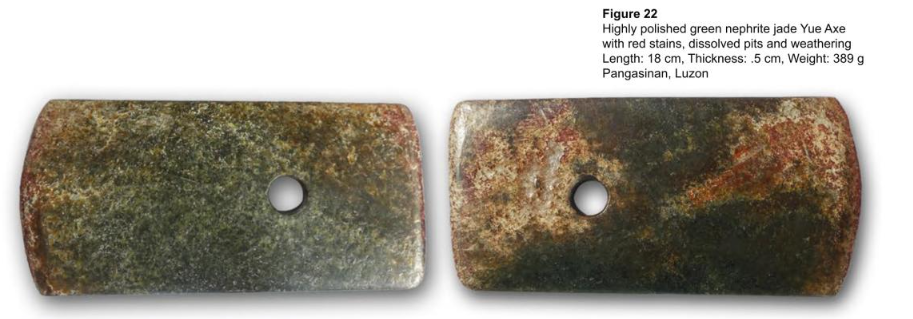
Green Jade Yue Axes found in Pangasinan. Although carved as weapons, the expensive value of such items, meant that its use is more ceremonial and royal rather than martial.

The locals wore apparel typical of other maritime Southeast Asian ethnic groups in addition to Japanese and Chinese silks. Even common people were clad in Chinese and Japanese cotton garments. They also blackened their teeth and were disgusted by the white teeth of foreigners, which were likened to that of animals. They used porcelain jars typical of Japanese and Chinese households. Japanese-style gunpowder weapons were also encountered in naval battles in the area. In exchange for these goods, traders from all over Asia would come to trade primarily for gold and slaves but also for deerskins, civets and other local products. Other than a notably more extensive trade network with Japan and China, they were culturally similar to other Luzon groups to the south, especially the Kapampangans and the neighboring Ilocanos Gold was soon sourced from Abra, which held large gold deposits which were traded all across Asia.

During the late 16th and 17th centuries, Spanish records often stated that the region of Pangasinan were war-like. They were often deemed rebellious, unconquered or "fond of blood" by conquistadors. Bishop Domingo de Salazar described them as "really the worst people–the fiercest and the cruelest in the land–an unconquered tribe whose fiestas were cutting off one another's heads".

=== Chinese records ===
==== Song records ====
According to some historians, places in the present-day province of Pangasinan like Lingayen Gulf were mentioned as early as 1225, when Lingayen, then known as Liyin, was listed in Zhao Rukuo's Zhu Fan Zhi (A Description of Barbarian Nations, Records of Foreign People) as one of the trading places along with Ma-i.

==== Warrior Princess Urduja ====
According to the Philippines' national hero, Jose Rizal, Pangasinan was once ruled by a warrior-princess named Urduja who, even though she was a woman, led armies. She was also said to be fluent in Turkish and made the kingdom of Pangasinan, also called Tawalisi, a rival of Mongol-ruled China. In 1916, Austin Craig, an American historian of the University of the Philippines, in "The Particulars of the Philippines Pre-Spanish Past", traced the land of Tawalisi and Princess Urduja to Pangasinan. In the province of Pangasinan, the governor's residence in Lingayen is named "Urduja House".

==== Ming records ====
Pangasinan as a place known by the Chinese, was first mentioned as early as 1406 when it was recorded to have responded to emissaries sent by China under the Yongle Emperor and had sent tribute missions from 1406–1411. According to Ming records, Pangasinan appeared five times with chieftains presenting their tributes to the Ming imperial court including: Kamayin on September 23, 1406, Taymey ("Tortoise Shell"), and Liyü in 1408 and 1409. On December 11, 1411, the emperor offered a state banquet to the Pangasinan delegation.

=== Limahong's conquests and early Spanish period ===
After the conquest of Pangasinan by Juan de Salcedo in 1572, Pangasinan was founded as an encomienda.

Limahong, a Chinese corsair and warlord, briefly invaded the polity after his failure in the Battle of Manila (1574). He then set up an enclave of wokou (Japanese and Chinese pirates) in Pangasinan. Nevertheless, the Mexico-born Juan de Salcedo and his force of Tagalog, Visayan, and Latino soldiers assaulted and destroyed the pirate kingdom and then incorporated the Pangasinan people and their polity into the Spanish East Indies of the Spanish Empire. To escape, the pirate Limahong dug up a canal in the Agno river delta as a means of escape on August 4, 1575.

== See also ==
- Pangasinan people
- Caboloan
- Cultural achievements of pre-colonial Philippines
