= Leonor Rivera =

Jose Rizal's childhood love interest (1867–1893

Leonora Rivera
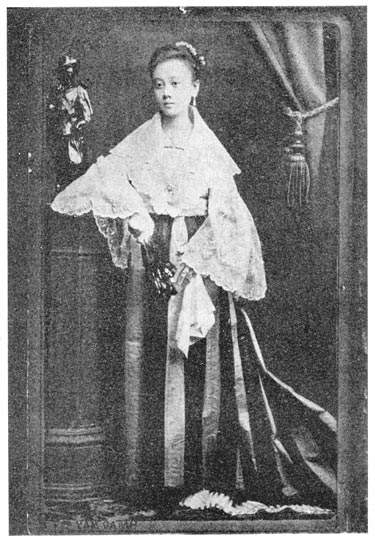
- A full-length portrait of Rivera, c. 1880s
- Born: Leonor Rivera y Bauzon; April 11, 1867; Camiling, Tarlac, Captaincy General of the Philippines, Spanish Empire
- Died: August 28, 1893 (aged 26); Manila, Captaincy General of the Philippines, Spanish Empire
- Known for: Maria Clara in Noli Me Tángere
- Spouse: Charles Henry Porter Kipping Jr. (m. 1890)
- Children: 2

Leonor Rivera-Kipping (née Rivera y Bauzon; 11 April 1867 – 28 August 1893) was the childhood sweetheart, and "lover by correspondence" of Philippine national hero José Rizal. Rivera was the "greatest influence" in preventing Rizal from falling in love with other women while Rizal was traveling outside the Philippines. Rivera's romantic relationship with Rizal lasted for eight years. She was immortalized by Rizal as the character María Clara in the Spanish-language novel Noli Me Tangere. Her original hometown is in Camiling, Tarlac.

== Description ==
Born as Leonor Bauzon Rivera, a native of Camiling, Tarlac, she was the daughter of Antonio Rivera and Silvestra Bauzon. Her father (whom Rizal calls "Uncle Antonio" in his letters) is a cousin of Rizal's father, Francisco Mercado. Austin Coates, Rizal's European biographer, described Rivera in Rizal: Philippine Nationalist and Martyr as a "pretty woman" whose physical features included having a "high forehead", "soft and wavy hair", a face that sported "almond eyes", "small and pensive mouth", and "engaging dimples". Furthermore, Rivera was a talented, mature, and intelligent lady who played the piano and was gifted with a "charming singing voice". Rivera studied at La Concordia College in Manila.

== Family background ==
Rivera's family resided in Dagupan from 1890 to 1891, when the railway line between Manila and Dagupan was being built. Her parents had a clothing merchandise business there. The Riveras first lived on Torres Bugallon Avenue at a property belonging to Don Alejandro Venteres and Doña Rosario Laurel Villamil, a couple closely connected to the family. The family later moved to a house belonging to Don Andrés Palaganas, whose son Ciriaco (a former Dagupan municipal president), was married Don Venteres's relative Paula Venteres. The second residence of the Riveras was located at a place presently known as Rivera Street.

== Relationship with Rizal ==
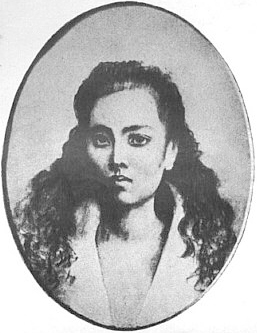
A crayon sketch of Leonor Rivera drawn by José Rizal.

Leonor Rivera and Rizal first met in Manila when Rivera was only 14 years old. When Rizal left for Europe on May 3, 1882, Rivera was 15 years of age. Their ensuing correspondence began when Rizal left a poem for Rivera saying farewell, and their letters to each other slowly became romantic in nature. The correspondence between Rivera and Rizal kept Rizal focused on his studies in Europe. They employed codes in their letters because Rivera's mother did not favor Rizal as a suitor for her daughter. A letter from Mariano Catigbac dated June 27, 1884 referred to Rivera as Rizal's "betrothed". Catigbac described Rivera as having been greatly affected by Rizal's departure, frequently sick because of insomnia.

When Rizal returned to the Philippines on August 5, 1887, Rivera was no longer living in Intramuros because she and her family had moved back to Dagupan, Pangasinan. Rizal and Rivera wanted to meet, but both were prohibited by their respective fathers; Francisco Mercado barred his son from seeing her in order to avoid endangering the Rivera family, as Rizal had by then been labeled a filibustero or subversive by the Spanish colonial government because of his novel, Noli Me Tángere. Rizal wanted to marry Rivera while he was still in the Philippines because of her uncomplaining fidelity, so they asked permission from his father one more time before his second departure. The meeting never happened.

In 1888, Rizal stopped receiving letters from Rivera for a year, even as he kept writing to her. The reason for Rivera's silence was the connivance between Rivera's mother and an Englishman named Charles Henry Kipping, a railway engineer who fell in love with Rivera and was favored by Rivera's mother.

== Marriage to Kipping ==
Rivera met Kipping at the house of Doña Carmen Villamil, who was a former classmate of hers at La Concordia College. Kipping was associated with the engineer Crisóstomo Villamil, who supervised the Manila-Dagupan railway line project at the time. Rivera and Kipping were married on June 17, 1890, in Dagupan. Their first child was Carlos Rivera Kipping Sr.

== Death ==
Rivera died on 28 August 1893, shortly after giving birth to her second child with Kipping. Shortly before she died, her last wish was to have the silver box containing the ashes of Rizal's burned letters be buried with her.

== Media portrayals ==
- Portrayed by Mickey Ferriols in the film, Jose Rizal (1998).
- Portrayed by Kylie Padilla in the TV series, Ilustrado (2014).

== See also ==
- Josephine Bracken
