= Caboloan =

Major historical polity in Northern Luzon

Coordinates: 14°37′08″N 120°57′58″E

Kingdom of Caboloan Luyag na Caboloan
- before 1406–1587
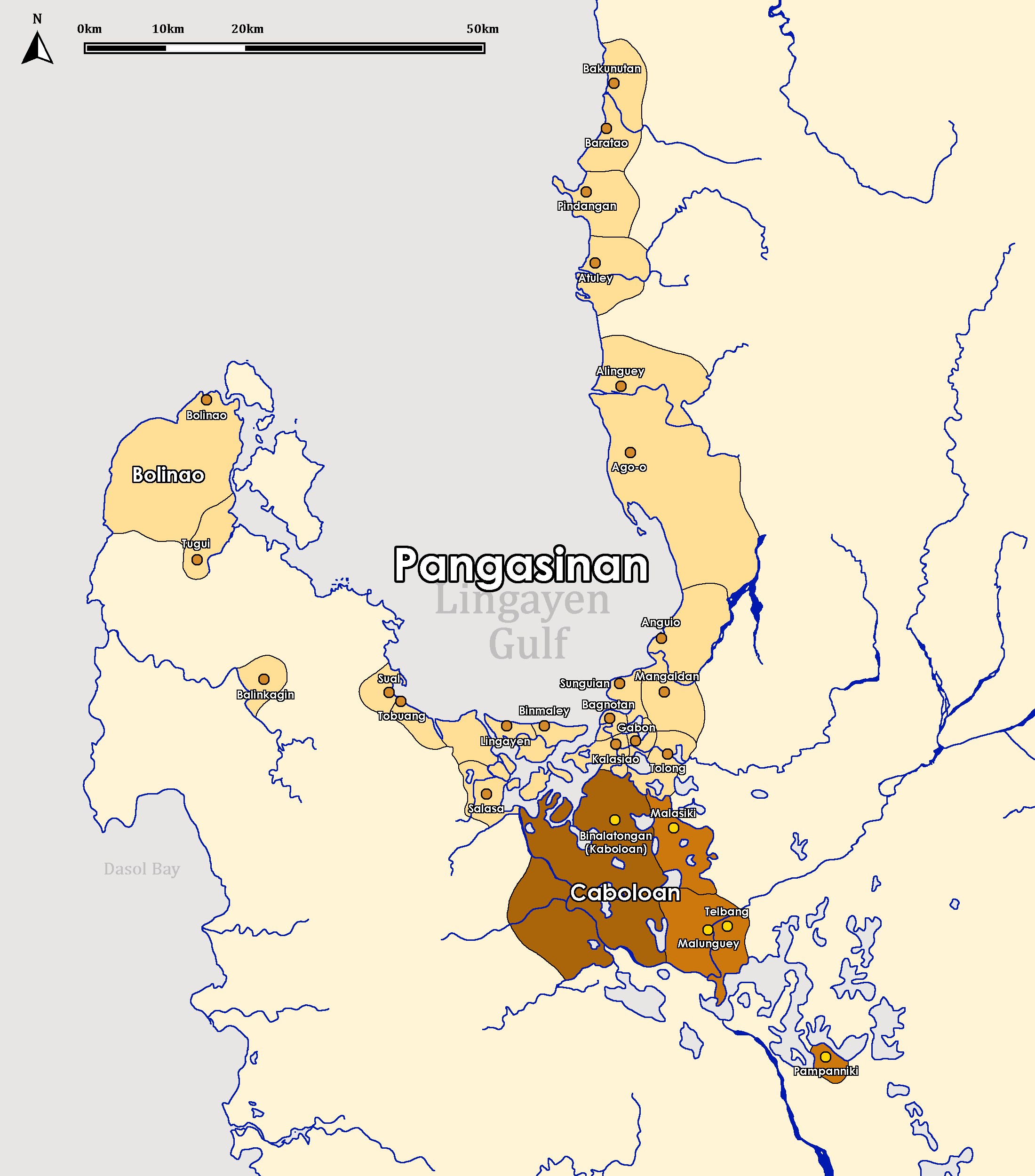
- A map of Caboloan with Binalatongan (dark brown) and associate settlements (brown) during the 15th-16th centuries.
- Capital: Binalatongan
- Common languages: Pangasinan language and other Northern Luzon languages
- Religion: Animism
- Government: Monarchy (Chiefdom/Petty kingdom
- Ari/King
  - 16th century–1587: Ari Kasikis (disputed)
- History
  - Established: before 1406
  - Integration into the Spanish East Indies: 1587

Population
  - Census: 3,200 (1591)
Succeeded by
Captaincy General of the Philippines; Pangasinan
- Today part of: Philippines

Luyag na Caboloan, known simply as Caboloan, alternatively as Binalatongan, was a sovereign pre-colonial Philippine polity (panarian) situated near the Agno River delta, centered around Binalatongan (modern-day San Carlos). It was reportedly the largest settlement in the entire Pangasinan region.

== Etymology ==
Caboloan refers to the place where there is an abundance of bolo (Gigantochloa levis), a species of bamboo that abounds at the interior plains of Pangasinan. The term Caboloan has been supplanted by the Spanish Augustinian missionaries from the settlement of Bolinao, who named the entire region from the Lingayen Gulf coastline and the interior as ‘Pangasinan’, which included the region around Binalatongan.

It was also known as Luyag na Caboloan, which literally means ‘place known as Caboloan’, or as ‘luyag ed dapit-ilog’ (a place near the river), while Pangasinan at the coast of Lingayen Gulf were known as ‘luyag ed dapit-baybay’ (place near the coast).

The word Caboloan was first cited in Fr. Mariano Pellicer's book, Arte de la Lengua Pangasinana o Caboloan (1840), which was based on an earlier grammar book in the 1690 by an anonymous author. The term Caboloan remained in use to refer to the interior of Pangasinan until the 19th century.

Caboloan was also alternatively referred to as simply ‘Binalatongan’, which came from the root word balatong (mung beans).

== History ==
=== Precolonial period ===
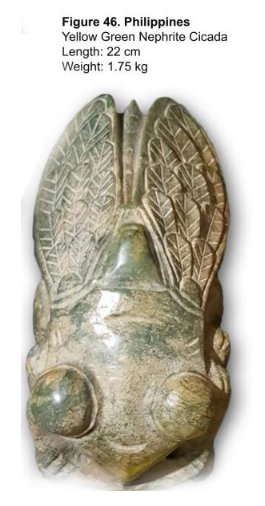
Green Nephrite Jade Cicada found in the Philippines. Jade which is sourced from nearby Taiwan was often carved in the Philippines for prestige purposes using local motifs.

Caboloan's capital, Binalatongan (modern-day San Carlos), located near the Agno River delta, was said to be the largest settlement in the entire region, with over two thousand houses. Historically, the community of Binalatongan was called Sapan Palapar (wide river), which referred to the Agno River. According to Baldomero Pulido's doctoral dissertation as well as Restituto Basa, Caboloan was a 'kingdom' ruled by a man named Ari Kasikis, while Pangasinan was ruled by Ari Kasilag. This ruler was also mentioned in the census of 1918, 1920 and by the history book ‘History of Lingayen’ (1957) by Santiago S. Velasquez. According to local legend, the kingdom was said to have spanned Tarlac, Nueva Ecija, Zambales, La Union, Mountain Province and Pangasinan. However, historian Erwin Fernandez (2010) notes that:

Pangasinan history writers had propagated the names Kasilag and Kasikis as the two kings ruling in the coastal and interior communities contemporaneous with Rajahs Soliman and Lakandula but this contact period account did not cite any of these names. The reason might have been the 1920 source, on which these authors had relied, which mentioned Kasikis – the Census of the Philippine Islands…in the year 1918. Without going to the original sources, historical writers with the exception of historians are liable to writing fiction, not history. This situation similarly applies to the search for the founding date of Pangasinan. Kasikis and Kasilag might be another Urduja or Thalamasin.

=== Spanish conquest and occupation ===
After the conquest of Pangasinan by Juan de Salcedo in 1572, the encomienda of Pangasinan was founded as an encomienda. However this did not yet include Caboloan.

In 1574, the Chinese pirate Limahong landed in Pangasinan to establish his own kingdom. In reaction, the Spaniards landed at San Fabian on 23 March 1575. Afterwards, it was said that the Spaniards climbed at the foot of the Zambales Mountains to observe the kingdom of Ari Kasikis, where they witnessed a highly organized animistic ritual.

In 1587, Binalatongan was founded by Spanish Dominicans as well as Augustinian missionaries such as Fr. Francisco dela Rama who evangelized the natives and established a church known as the Saint Dominic Church. It was reported to be the first town founded by the Dominicans in the Philippines. The mission of Binalatongan was officially accepted as a vicariate of the Dominican Order in its First Provincial Chapter in 1588, with Fr. Bernardo de Santa Catalina, OP, as its first Vicar (equivalent to the office of the parish priest), together with Fr. Juan de Castro, OP, Fr. Marcos de San Antonio, and Bro. Juan Deza, OP as his assistants.

At the start of the foundation, Binalatongan formerly included the towns of Calasiao, Binmaley, Bayambang, Malasiqui, Aguilar, San Carlos City, Urbiztondo, and Basista.

In a letter of Fr. Diego de Rojas to the colonial governor in 29 March 1591, that the people of Caboloan preferred to dwell into the interior rather than settle at the royal encomiendas at the coasts, which were sandy and not suitable for their lifestyle.

In a 1591 report about the various encomiendas of the archipelago, it was reported that Binalatongan had a population of around 3,200 people in total.

In 1611, the province of Pangasinan was made, annexing both the settlements around the Lingayen Gulf excluding Bolinao, as well as the interior settlements, which included Binalatongan, ending its independence as a politically separate territory from Pangasinan.

During the mid Spanish period, Binalatongan was well known as a site of many rebellions within Pangasinan, which included the revolts of Don Andres Malong (1660) and Juan de la Cruz Palaris (1762) during the Seven Years’ War.

On 4 November 1718, in the aftermath of the rebellious period, the capital of Binalatongan would be transferred in what is now known as the poblacion of San Carlos, in which the town would also be renamed the same date.

== Culture and Religion ==
The people of Caboloan and the people of Pangasinan belonged to a single ethnic group, which is contemporarily referred to simply as "Pangasinan". Similar to other chiefdoms in Pangasinan, the people of Caboloan were also known for their warrior culture. They worshipped Apolaki, the "God of War", who, according to Aduarte, scolded the people for "receiving foreigners with white teeth", as blackening their teeth was one of their customs. The people of Caboloan also performed tagams (war dances), and were also known as raiders or mangangayaw.

Similar to other cultures in the Philippine Archipelago, they also worshipped anitos and had female shamans. Mourning rites also required human sacrifice and adultery was strictly punished.

== Economy ==
Caboloan was reliant on its bamboo, hence the name of the state. It traded bamboo, beeswax and other forest products with the coastal settlements in exchange for salt and other items coming from the trade with the Ming Chinese. The river Agno was a well-used river for trade, commerce and transport of goods from one place to another. The Agno flows from the interior and into the river delta.

While disadvantaged with the lack of maritime commerce, Caboloan had an abundance of water supply and arable land, as well as other raw materials. Hence they were referred to as better developed than their coastal counterparts. They were also known for trading with the Chinese, the Japanese and Indians. It is said that by the time that the Spaniards had arrived, that the people of Caboloan were already wearing gold jewelry and had a well-developed system of agriculture and farming methods.

== See also ==
- San Carlos, Pangasinan
- Pangasinan (historical polity)
- Pangasinan
- Pangasinan language
- Tawalisi
