= Alfonso G. Pablo Sr. =

Retired ordained Filipino Wesleyan clergyman

Rev. Dr. Alfonso G. Pablo Sr. D.Min. M.Div. B.Th.
- General Superintendent emeritus
- Church: Wesleyan Church of the Philippines
- Predecessor: Dr. Saturnino P. Garcia
- Successor: Bishop Alberto Patacsil
- Other posts: General Superintendent (1989–2005); Assistant General Superintendent

Personal details
- Born: September 9, 1939 Camiling, Tarlac, Philippines
- Died: November 24, 2021 (aged 82)
- Denomination: Wesleyan Church of the Philippines
- Parents: Alfonso A. Pablo
- Spouse: Filipina "Fely" Arciaga
- Profession: preacher, pastor, educator, administrator
- Education: Kabacan Wesleyan Bible College, Kabacan, Cotabato

Alfonso G. Pablo Sr. (born September 29, 1939, in Camiling, Tarlac, Philippines) is a retired ordained Filipino Wesleyan clergyman who was General Superintendent of the Wesleyan Church of the Philippines from 1989 to 2005, and was the chairman of the International Conference of The Wesleyan Church (formerly Wesleyan World Fellowship) for four years from 2000. Pablo is currently General Superintendent emeritus of The Wesleyan Church of the Philippines, a distinguished professor at the Wesleyan Graduate School for Asia Pacific in Rosales, Pangasinan, adjunct professor at Asia-Pacific Nazarene Theological Seminary, and the chairman of Global Transformation Ministries, and chairman of the Asia Evangelistic Fellowship Philippines. Pablo has led various parachurch organizations in the evangelical community, including being the chairman of the Philippine Council of Evangelical Churches. In 2010, Pablo published a book, Transforming Leaders: The Filipino Church Administration. This followed by his second book Transforming Households (2014) and his third book Transforming Believers, October 2020. He is currently writing his fourth one, Transforming Faith.

== Early life, education and career ==
Like many other from the Ilocano tribe of Luzon, Pablo's family also migrated to Mindanao.

In 1973 Pablo was elected President of the Kabacan Wesleyan Bible College, and also became General Secretary of educational institutions and Sunday schools for the Wesleyan Church in the Philippines. In 1976 Pablo resigned as President of KWBC, to attend Asian Theological Seminary in Quezon City, where he completed the Master of Divinity in 1979. Pablo earned his Doctor of Ministry in Practical Theology at Asia-Baptist Graduate School of Theology in Baguio in 1982. In 1983 Pablo was elected President of the Philippines Association of Bible and Theological Schools, where he served until 1987.

On February 21, 1989, the Wesleyan Church Philippine General Conference was organized with Pablo, who had been serving as assistant General Superintendent under Dr. Saturnino P. Garcia, elected as the first General Superintendent on the first ballot with 40 out of 51 votes. Consequently, Pablo was an ex officio member of the Council of General Superintendents of the Wesleyan Church. Pablo served as General Superintendent of the Philippine Conference until 2005. During that period Pablo also served as a member of the board of the Asian Theological Seminary in Manila from 1989 to 2006; a member of the board of the Disciple a Whole Nation Coordinating Committee (from 1990 until now); a member of the board of Every Home for Christ from 1995 to 2007; chairman of the Philippine Council of Evangelical Churches from 1996 to 2000; and as the President of the Philippine Association of Christian Education Graduate School in Christian Education from 2000 to 2001. From 2000 to 2004, Pablo served as chairman of the Wesleyan World Fellowship.

Since his retirement as General Superintendent in 2005, Pablo continues to serve in various leadership positions including as an adjunct professor at Asia-Pacific Nazarene Theological Seminary in Taytay, Rizal since 2005; and since 2008 as the chairman of the boards of Global Training Ministries Incorporated, Asia Evangelistic Fellowship Philippines, and J29 Global Transformation Foundation.

== Personal life ==
Pablo is married to Filipina "Fely" Arciaga-Pablo and they have one daughter and three sons with eight grandchildren. Pablo died on November 24 at the Philippine Heart center after being in a deep coma for few days. He was 82.
