= Pangasinan people =

Pangasinan Totoon Pangasinan
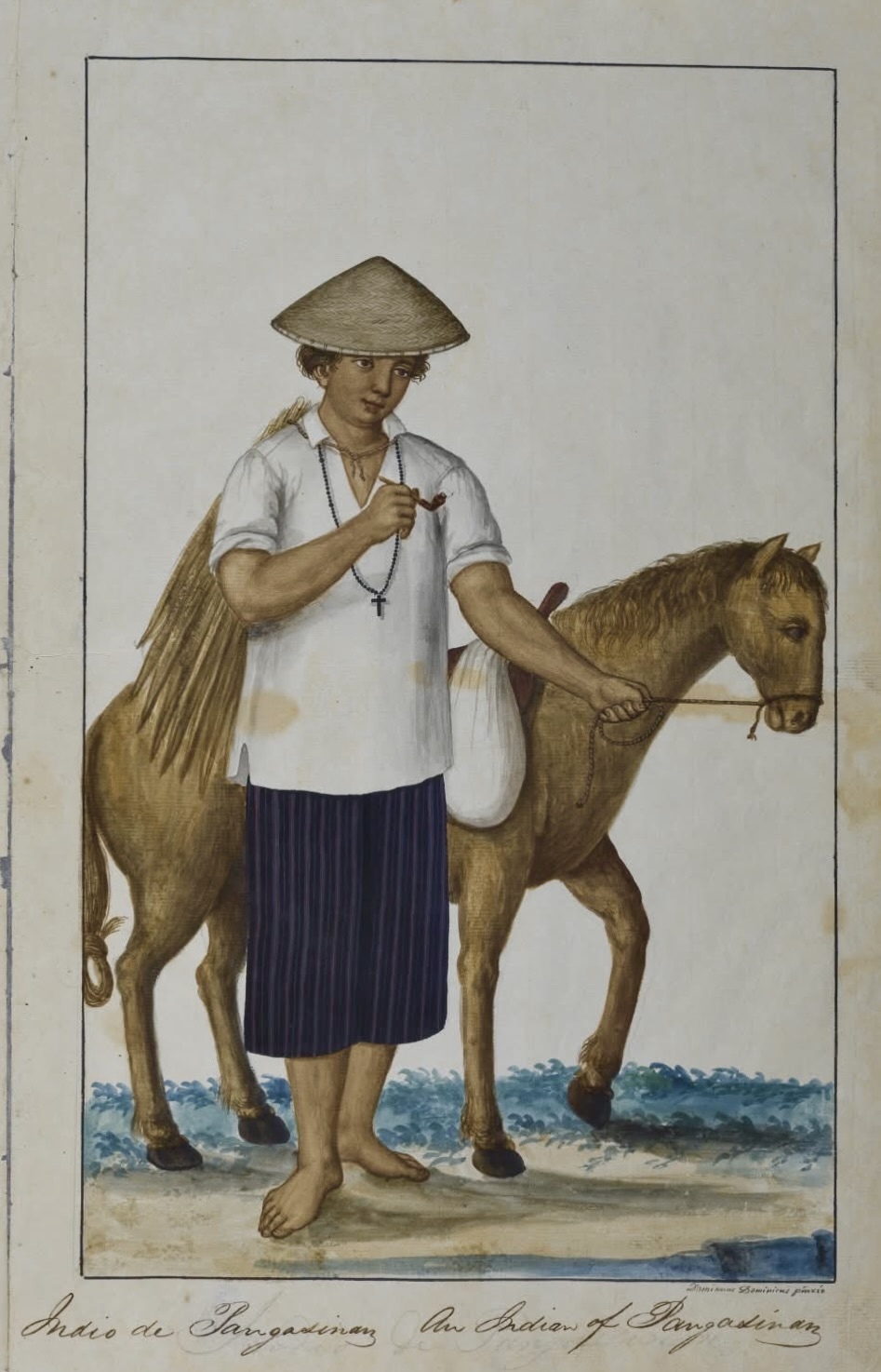
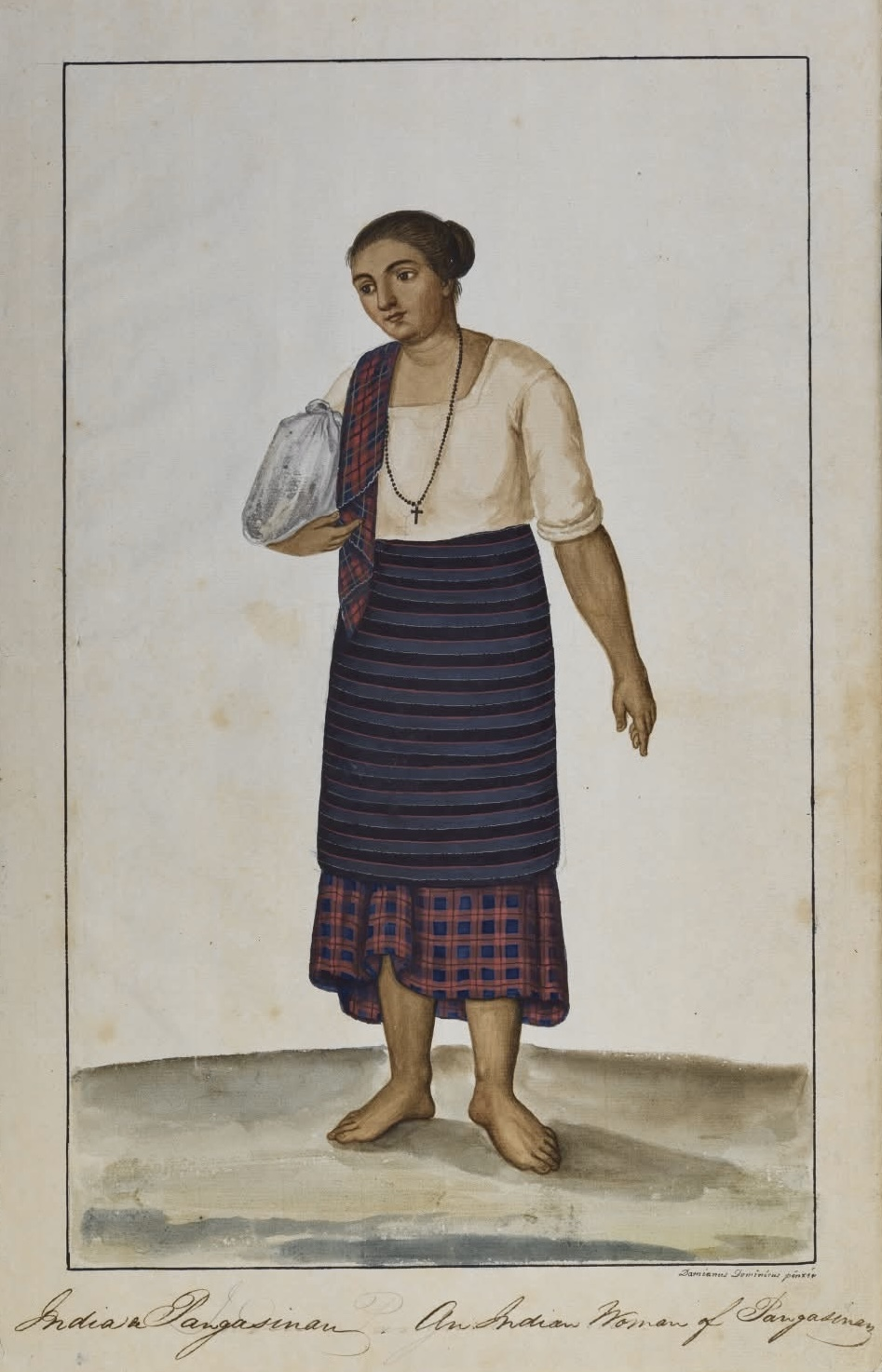
- Pangasinenses (natives of Pangasinan), painted by Damian Domingo circa 1833.

Total population
- 2,012,496 (2020 census) (1.9% of the Philippine population)

Regions with significant populations
- Philippines (Pangasinan, Tarlac, La Union, Benguet, Nueva Ecija, Zambales, Nueva Vizcaya, Metro Manila) United States Canada Worldwide

Languages
- Pangasinan, Ilocano, Tagalog, English

Religion
- Predominantly Roman Catholics, some are Protestants, Iglesia ni Cristo, Muslim, Buddhist and Animist

Related ethnic groups
- Filipinos (Kapampangan, Sambal, Ilocano, Ibanag, Igorot, Ivatan, other Filipino ethnic groups) other Austronesian peoples

The Pangasinan people (Pangasinan: Totoon Pangasinan), also known as Pangasinense, are an ethnolinguistic group native to the Philippines. Numbering 1,823,865 in 2010, they are the tenth largest ethnolinguistic group in the country. In the 2020 census Pangasinan speaking households made up roughly 1.3% of Philippine households. They live mainly in their native province of Pangasinan and the adjacent provinces of La Union and Tarlac, as well as Benguet, Nueva Ecija, Zambales, and Nueva Vizcaya. Smaller groups are found elsewhere in the Philippines and worldwide in the Filipino diaspora.

== Etymology ==
The name Pangasinan means 'land of salt' or 'place of salt-making'. It is derived from asin, the word for 'salt' in Pangasinan. The Pangasinan people are referred as Pangasinense. The term Pangasinan can refer to the indigenous speakers of the Pangasinan language or people of Pangasinan heritage.

== Demographics ==
The Pangasinan people are shown in brown.

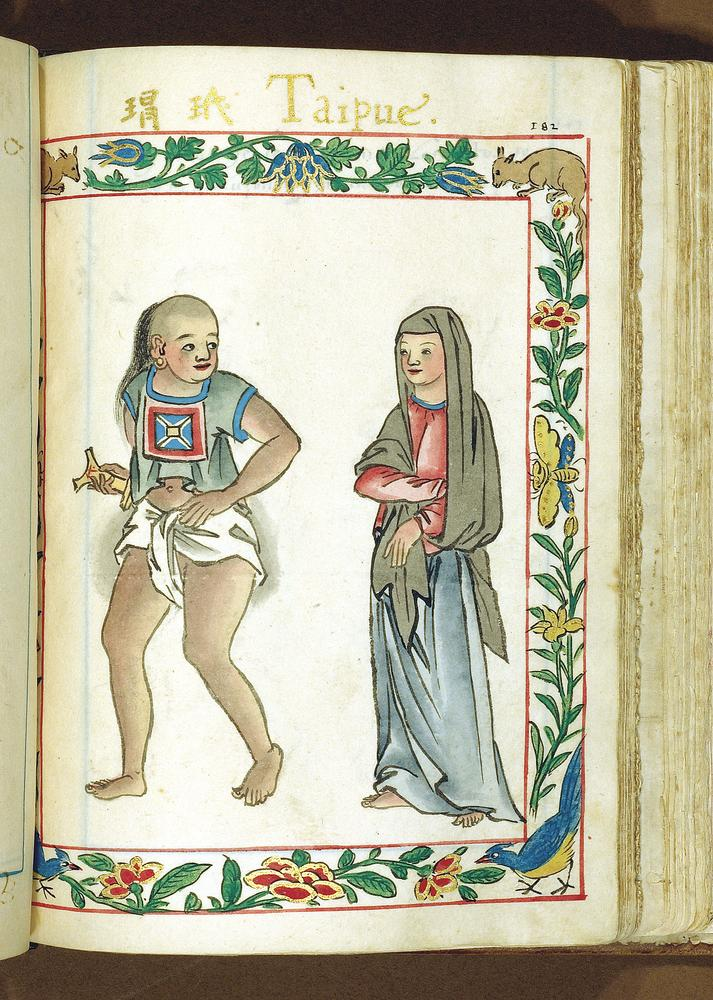
Possible Pangasinense Inhabitants of Pangasinan with tied hair and Kampilan sword, depicted in the Boxer Codex (1590) surmised to come from Taimei Anchorage, Lingayen Gulf, Luzon

The estimated population of the Pangasinan people in the province of Pangasinan is 2.5 million. The Pangasinan people are also living in the neighboring provinces of Tarlac, La Union, and Zambales (which used to be parts of Pangasinan Province), Benguet, Nueva Ecija, and Nueva Vizcaya; as well as in Pangasinan communities in other parts of the Philippines (especially Metro Manila, Cagayan, Isabela, Quirino, Bataan, Bulacan, Pampanga, Aurora, Quezon, Cavite, Laguna, Mindoro, Palawan, Negros Island and Mindanao, especially in Soccsksargen, Davao Region, Caraga, Bukidnon and Misamis Oriental) and overseas. Kapampangans were the native residents of the northwest areas of Nueva Ecija; Pangasinan settlers moved there during early years of Spanish territorial period until the Kapampangans assimilated to the Pangasinan settlers.

== Languages ==
Their native language is also named Pangasinan, which is classified under the Pangasinic group of languages of the Northern Philippine language branch of Malayo-Polynesian languages. Many Pangasinan are multilingual and fluent in Ilocano, English, and Filipino. However, the spread and influence of the other languages is contributing to the decline of the Pangasinan language. Many Pangasinan people, especially the native speakers are promoting the use of Pangasinan in the print and broadcast media, Internet, local governments, courts, public facilities and schools in Pangasinan. In April 2006, the creation of Pangasinan Wikipedia was proposed, which the Wikimedia Foundation approved for publication on the Internet.

Pangasinan residents in Zambales and Tarlac may also have knowledge of Sambal and Kapampangan. Pangasinan residents of Mindanao and their descendants are also fluent speakers of Cebuano (majority language of large parts of Mindanao), Hiligaynon (main lingua franca of Soccsksargen), Butuanon, Surigaonon (Visayan languages native in Caraga) and various indigenous Mindanaoan languages in addition to their native language. However, Pangasinan language has been endangered especially among newer generation of Pangasinans born in Mindanao due to assimilation to the Cebuano-speaking majority, with Cebuano is their main language with varying fluency in their ancestors' native language or none at all.

== Indigenous religion ==
Prior to Spanish colonization, the Pangasinan people believed in a pantheon of unique deities (gods and goddesses).

=== Immortals ===
- Ama: the supreme deity, ruler of others, and the creator of mankind; sees everything through his aerial abode; father of Agueo and Bulan also referred as Ama-Gaolay
- Agueo: the morose and taciturn sun god who is obedient to his father, Ama; lives in a palace of light
- Bulan: the merry and mischievous moon god, whose dim palace was the source of the perpetual light which became the stars; guides the ways of thieves

=== Mortals ===
- Urduja: a warrior princess who headed a supreme fleet

== Notable individuals ==
Urduja was a legendary woman warrior who is regarded as a heroine in Pangasinan. Malong and Palaris fought for independence from Spanish rule. Other prominent people of Pangasinan descent include Fidel Ramos (born in Lingayen, he served in the Cabinet of President Corazón Aquino, first as chief-of-staff of the Armed Forces of the Philippines, and later on, as Secretary of National Defense from 1986 to 1991 before becoming the Philippine's 12th president), Tania Dawson whose mother hails from Santa Maria, Pangasinan, lawmaker Jose de Venecia, Jr., who was born in Dagupan City, Pangasinan; and actor and National Artist Fernando Poe, Jr., whose father was from San Carlos City, Pangasinan. Other notable Pangasinenses are Victorio C. Edades, Angela Perez Baraquio, Ambrosio Padilla, Cheryl Cosim (reporter and news program host), Marc Pingris, Leo Soriano, and Ric Segreto. Notable Pangasinense actresses and actors include Donita Rose, Marlou Aquino, Lolita Rodriguez, Barbara Perez, Gloria Romero, Carmen Rosales, Nova Villa, Jhong Hilario, Liza Soberano and Hannah Rose Escaño (famous business woman fighting for women's rights).

== See also ==
- Bagoong
- Bicolano people
- Pangasinan (historical polity)
- Igorot people
- Ilocano people
- Ivatan people
- Kapampangan people
- Limahong
- Lumad
- Moro people
- Negrito
- Lowland Christian Filipinos
- Sambal people
- Tagalog people
- Visayan people
  - Cebuano people
    - Boholano people
  - Hiligaynon people
  - Waray people
