= Pangasinan language =

Austronesian language spoken in the Philippines

Pangasinan
- Pangasinense
- Salitan Pangasinan
- Pronunciation: [paŋɡasiˈnan]
- Native to: Philippines
- Region: Ilocos Region (entirety of Pangasinan, southwestern La Union); Central Luzon (northern Tarlac, northwestern Nueva Ecija, northern Zambales); Cordilleras (southwestern Benguet); Cagayan Valley (southwestern Nueva Vizcaya)
- Ethnicity: Pangasinan
- Native speakers: 1.8 million (2010); 8th most spoken native language in the Philippines
- Language family: Austronesian: Malayo-Polynesian; Philippine; Northern Philippine; Northern Luzon; Meso-Cordilleran; Southern Cordilleran; West Southern Cordilleran; Pangasinan
- Writing system: Latin (Pangasinan alphabet); Historically written in: Kurítan

Official status
- Official language in: Pangasinan
- Recognised minority language in: Philippines (Regional language)
- Regulated by: Komisyon sa Wikang Filipino

Language codes
- ISO 639-2: pag
- ISO 639-3: pag
- Glottolog: pang1290
- Linguasphere: 31-CGA-f
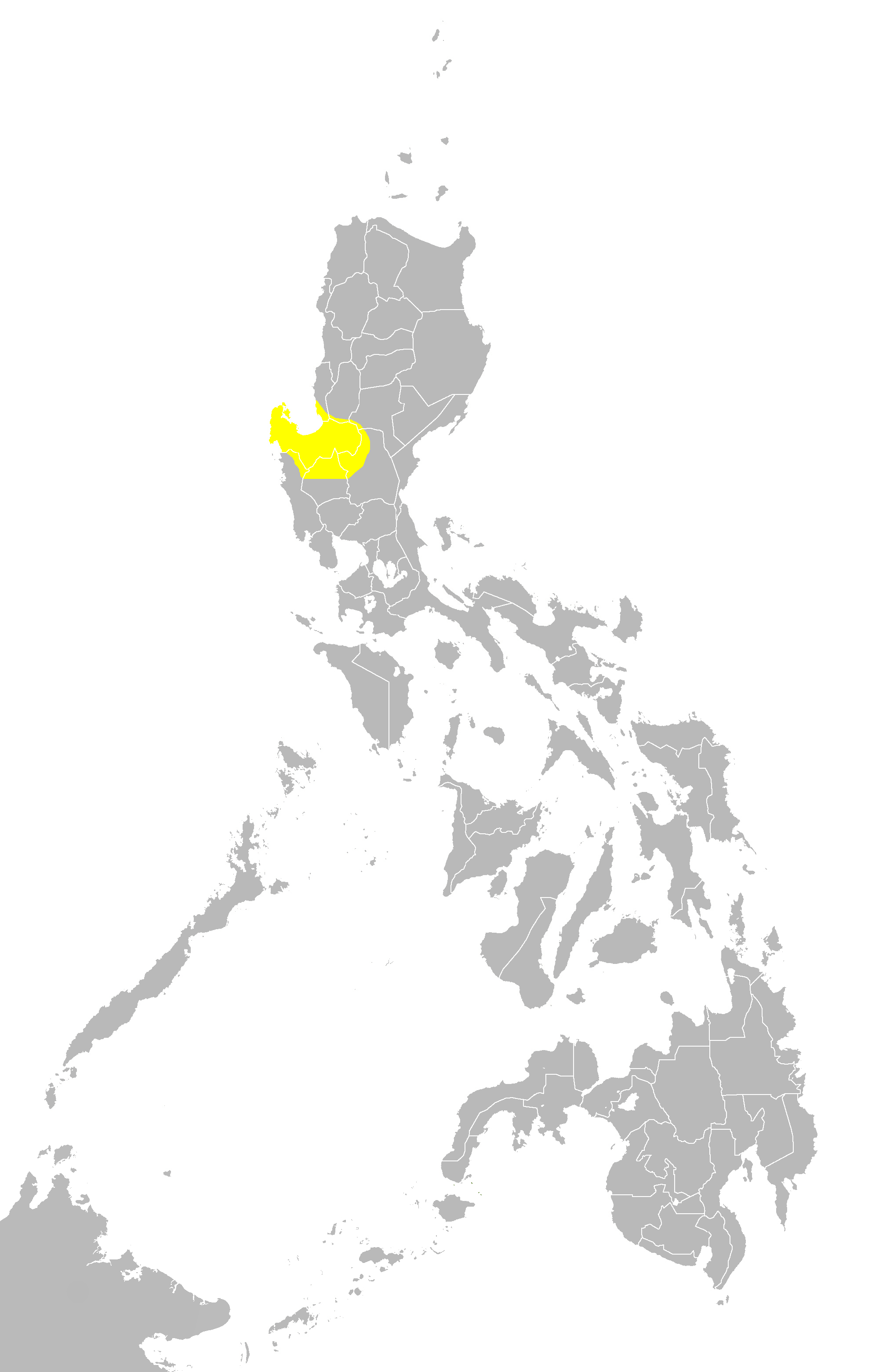
- Areas where Pangasinan is spoken in the Philippines.

Pangasinan (Pangasinense) is an Austronesian language, and one of the eight major languages of the Philippines. It is the primary and predominant language of the entire province of Pangasinan and northern Tarlac, on the northern part of Luzon's central plains geographic region, most of whom belong to the Pangasinan ethnic group. Pangasinan is also spoken in southwestern La Union, as well as in the municipalities of Benguet, Nueva Vizcaya, Nueva Ecija, and Zambales that border Pangasinan. A few Aeta groups and most Sambal in Central Luzon's northern part also understand and even speak Pangasinan as well.

== Classification ==
The Pangasinan language belongs to the Malayo-Polynesian languages branch of the Austronesian languages family. Pangasinan is similar to other closely related Philippine languages, Malay in Malaysia (as Malaysian), Indonesia (as Indonesian), Brunei, and Singapore, Hawaiian in Hawaii, Māori in New Zealand, and Malagasy in Madagascar.

While closely related to the languages of neighboring Benguet, Pangasinan is the sole member of the Pangasinic sub-branch. It is a sister language to the Nuclear Southern Cordilleran group.

The relationship within the Southern Cordilleran branch is structured as follows:

- Pangasinic
  - Pangasinan
- Nuclear Southern Cordilleran
  - Ibaloi
  - Karao
  - Iwak
  - Kallahan (including Keley-i, Kayapa, and Tinoc)

== Geographic distribution ==
Pangasinan is the official language of the province of Pangasinan, located on the west central area of the island of Luzon along Lingayen Gulf. The people of Pangasinan are also referred to as Pangasinense. The province has a total population of 2,343,086 (2000), of which 2 million speak Pangasinan. As of 2020, Pangasinan is ranked tenth on the leading languages generally spoken at home in the Philippines with only 334,759 households still speaking the language. Pangasinan is spoken in other Pangasinan communities in the Philippines, mostly in the neighboring provinces of Benguet, La Union, Nueva Ecija, Tarlac, Zambales, and Nueva Vizcaya, and has varying speakers in Metro Manila, Cagayan, Isabela, Quirino, Bulacan, Bataan, Pampanga, Aurora, Quezon, Cavite, Laguna, Mindoro, Palawan and Mindanao especially in Soccsksargen, Davao Region, Caraga, Bukidnon and Misamis Oriental.

== History ==
Austronesian speakers settled in Maritime Southeast Asia during prehistoric times, perhaps more than 5,000 years ago. The indigenous speakers of Pangasinan are descendants of these settlers, who were probably part of a wave of prehistoric human migration that is widely believed to have originated from Southern China via Taiwan between 10 and 6 thousand years ago.

The word Pangasinan means 'land of salt' or 'place of salt-making'; it is derived from the root word asin, the word for 'salt' in Pangasinan. Pangasinan could also refer to a 'container of salt or salted products'; it refers to the ceramic jar for storage of salt or salted-products or its contents.

=== Literature ===
Written Pangasinan and oral literature in the language flourished during the Spanish and American period. Writers like Juan Saingan, Felipe Quintos, Narciso Corpus, Antonio Solis, Juan Villamil, Juan Mejía and María C. Magsano wrote and published in Pangasinan. Felipe Quintos, a Pangasinan officer of the Katipunan, wrote Sipi Awaray: Gelew Diad Pilipinas (Revolución Filipina), a history of the Katipunan revolutionary struggle in Pangasinan and surrounding provinces. Narciso Corpus and Antonio Solis co-wrote Impanbilay na Manoc a Tortola, a short love story. (Lingayen, Pangasinan: Gumawid Press, 1926)

Juan Villamil translated José Rizal's "Mi último adiós" in Pangasinan. Pablo Mejia edited Tunong, a news magazine, in the 1920s. He also wrote Bilay tan Kalkalar nen Rizal, a biography of Rizal. Magsano published Silew, a literary magazine. Magsano also wrote Samban Agnabenegan, a romance novel. Pangasinan Courier published articles and literary works in Pangasinan. Pioneer Herald published Sinag, a literary supplement in Pangasinan. Many Christian publications in Pangasinan are widely available.

Many Pangasinan are multilingual and proficient in English, Filipino, and Ilocano. However, the spread and influence of the other languages is contributing to the decline of the Pangasinan language. Many Pangasinan people, especially the native speakers are promoting the use of Pangasinan in the print and broadcast media, Internet, local governments, courts, public facilities and schools in Pangasinan. In April 2006, the creation of Pangasinan Wikipedia was proposed, which the Wikimedia Foundation approved for publication on the Internet.

== Phonology ==
=== Vowels ===
Pangasinan has the following vowel phonemes:

	Front	Central	Back
Close	i	ɨ	u
Open-Mid	(ɛ)		(ɔ)
Open		a	

In native vocabulary, /i/ and /u/ are realized as [i ~ ɪ ~ ɛ] and [u ~ ʊ ~ ɔ]. The close variants [i]/[u] are only used in stressed open syllables, while the open-mid variants [ɛ]/[ɔ] occur in open and closed final syllables before a pause. The default variants [ɪ]/[ʊ] occur in all other environments.

Some speakers have /ɛ/ and /ɔ/ as distinct phonemes, but only in loanwords.

=== Consonants ===
		Bilabial	Dental / Alveolar	Palatal	Velar	Glottal
Nasal		m	n		ŋ	
Plosive	voiceless	p	t	tʃ	k	ʔ
Plosive	voiced	b	d	dʒ	ɡ	
Fricative			s	ʃ		h
Flap			ɾ			
Approximant			l	j	w	

Pangasinan is one of the Philippine languages that do not exhibit [ɾ]-[d] allophony, they only contrast before consonants and word-final positions; otherwise, they become allophones where [d] is only located in word-initial positions and after consonants & [ɾ] is only pronounced between vowels. Before consonants and word-final positions, [ɾ] is in free variation with trill [r]. In Spanish & Ilocano loanwords, [d] and [ɾ] contrast in all word positions.

All consonantal phonemes except /h, ʔ/ may be a syllable onset or coda. The phoneme /h/ rarely occurs in coda position. Although the Spanish word reloj 'clock' would have been heard as [re.loh], the final /h/ is dropped resulting in /re.lo/. However, this word also may have entered the Pangasinan lexicon at early enough a time that the word was still pronounced /re.loʒ/, with the j pronounced as in French, resulting in /re.los/ in Pangasinan. As a result, both /re.lo/ and /re.los/ occur.

The glottal stop /ʔ/ is not permissible as coda; it can only occur as onset. Even as an onset, the glottal stop disappears in affixation. Glottal stop /ʔ/ sometimes occurs in coda in words ending in vowels, only before a pause.

== Grammar ==
=== Sentence structure ===
Like other Malayo-Polynesian languages, Pangasinan has a verb–subject–object word order. Pangasinan is an agglutinative language.

=== Case Markers ===
Pangasinan Markers
		Nominative	Genitive	Oblique
Common	singular	say (Note: Markers say and saray are used in place of so and so saray respectively in the beginning of a sentence.) (Note: Say may come from sa + -y, sa being a proximal demonstrative and -y an alternative form of so.), so (-y) (Note: Markers so, na, si, and ni can optionally be -y if the previous word ends in either a vowel or the consonant /n/. The final /n/ of the previous word is deleted when -y is attached (<'y> in orthography with mandatory apostrophe if attached to a word ending in /n/).)	na (-y)	ed (-d) (Note: Marker ed can optionally be -d if the previous word ends in either a vowel or the consonant /n/(<'d> in orthography). The final /n/ of the previous word is deleted when -d is attached.), na (-y), dyad (Note: Dyad is used instead of ed if it is at the beginning of a sentence. Dyad came from dia (here) + ed.)
Common	plural	saray, so saray, (i)ra so (Note: The initial /i/ in ira so and iray is dropped if the previous word ends in a vowel, spelled as 'ra so and 'ray in orthography.), (i)ray	na saray, day, daray	ed saray (-d saray), na saray
Personal	singular	si (-y)	ni (-y)	ed, ed kyenen, ed kinen
Personal	plural	si, di, sikara di, sara di	da di, na sara di	ed sikara di, ed kyen di, ed kindi

=== Pronouns ===
==== Personal ====
			Absolutive		Ergative	Oblique
			Independent	Enclitic	Ergative	Oblique
1st person	singular		siák	ak	-k(o)	ed siak
1st person	dual		sikatá	ita, ta	-ta	ed sikata
1st person	plural	inclusive	sikatayó	itayo, tayo	-tayo	ed sikatayo
1st person	plural	exclusive	sikamí	kamí	mi	ed sikami
2nd person	singular		siká	ka	-m(o)	ed sika
2nd person	plural		sikayó	kayó	yo	ed sikayo
3rd person	singular		sikató	-, -a	to	ed sikato
3rd person	plural		sikara	ira, ra	da	ed sikara

==== Demonstrative ====
Pangasinan Markers
		Nominative		Genitive	Oblique	
		First series	Second series	Genitive	First series	Second series
Proximal	singular	saya, aya	so saya, 'ya	na saya, tonya	dyad saya	ed/na saya
Proximal	plural	saraya, araya	so saraya, iraya	na saraya, danya	dyad saraya	ed/na saraya
Medial	singular	satan, atan	so saya, (i)tan	na satan, tontan	dyad satan	ed/na satan
Medial	plural	saratan, aratan	so saratan, iratan	na saratan, dantan	dyat saratan	ed/na saratan
Distal	singular	saman, aman	si saman, (i)man	na saman, tonman	dyad saman	ed/na saman
Distal	plural	saraman, araman	so saraman, iraman	na saraman, danman	dyad saraman	ed/na saraman

=== Verbal Morphology ===
These are some verbal paradigms in Pangasinan.

	Contemplative	Imperfective	Perfective
maN-	maN- + root/stem	maN- + (C_{1})V_{1} + root/stem	naN-/aN- + root/stem
oN-	oN- + root/stem	oN- + (C_{1})V_{1} + root/stem	-inm- + root/stem
-en	root/stem + -en	(C_{1})V_{1} + root/stem + -en	-in- + root/stem
i-	i- + root/stem	i- + (C_{1})V_{1} + root/stem	iN- + root/stem
-an	root/stem + -an	(C_{1})V_{1} + root/stem + -an	-in-...-an + root/stem
i-...-an	i-...-an + root/stem	i-...-an + (C_{1})V_{1} + root/stem	iN-...-an + root/stem

=== Noun affixes ===
Benton (1971) lists a number of affixes for nouns. Benton describes affixes in Pangasinan as either "nominal" (affixes attached directly to nouns) and "nominalizing" (affixes which turn other parts of speech into nouns). Benton also describes "non-productive affixes", affixes which are not normally applied to nouns, and only found as part of other pre-existing words. Many of these non-productive affixes are found within words derived from Spanish.

== Writing system ==
The modern Pangasinan alphabet consists of 28 letters, which include the 26 letters of the basic Latin alphabet, the Spanish letter ñ, and the Pangasinan digraph ng:

Majuscule Forms (also called uppercase or capital letters)
A	B	C	D	E	F	G	H	I	J	K	L	M	N	Ñ	NG	O	P	Q	R	S	T	U	V	W	X	Y	Z
Minuscule Forms (also called lowercase or small letters)
a	b	c	d	e	f	g	h	i	j	k	l	m	n	ñ	ng	o	p	q	r	s	t	u	v	w	x	y	z

The ancient people of Pangasinan used an indigenous writing system called Kuritan. The ancient Pangasinan script, which is related to the Tagalog Baybayin script, was derived from the Javanese Kawi script of Indonesia and the Vatteluttu or Pallava script of South India.

The Latin script was introduced during the Spanish colonial period. Pangasinan literature, using the indigenous syllabary and the Latin alphabet, continued to flourish during the Spanish and American colonial period. Pangasinan acquired many Spanish and English words, and some indigenous words were Hispanicized or Anglicized. However, use of the ancient syllabary has declined, and not much literature written in it has survived.

== Loanwords ==
Most of the loan words in Pangasinan are Spanish, as the Philippines was ruled by Spain for more than 300 years. Examples are lugar ('place'), podir (from poder, 'power, care'), kontra (from contra, 'against'), birdi (verde, 'green'), ispiritu (espíritu, 'spirit'), and santo ('holy, saint'). Other loanwords came from English and Ilocano, as the latter is spoken as a second language. Another source of loanwords is Kapampangan, because of the migration of Kapampangans who passed through Agno River from Pampanga and south Tarlac; most Kapampangan loanwords are spoken in the dialects of central Pangasinan and north Tarlac and the most notable loanword is masanting, meaning "beautiful".

== Examples ==
Malinac ya Labi (original by Julian Velasco).

Malinac ya Labi
Oras ya mareen
Mapalpalnay dagem
Katekep to’y linaew
Samit day kogip ko
Binangonan kon tampol
Ta pilit na pusok ya sika'y amamayoen

Lalo la no bilay
No sikalay nanengneng
Napunas ya ami'y
Ermen ya akbibiten
No nodnonoten ko ra'y samit na ogalim
Agtaka nalingwanan
Anggad kaayos na bilay

Modern Pangasinan with English translation

Malinak lay Labi
Oras la’y mareen
Mapalpalna’y dagem
Katekep to’y linaew
Samit da’y kugip ko
Binangonan kon tampol
Lapu’d say limgas mo
Sikan sika’y amamayoen
Lalo la bilay
No sika la’y nanengne'ng
Napunas lan amin
So ermen ya akbibiten
No nanonotan
Ko la'y samit day ugalim
Ag ta ka nalingwanan
Angga’d kauyos na bilay

Translation:

A night of calm
An hour of peace
A gentle breeze
Along with it is the dew
So sweet is my dream
Suddenly I awake
Because of your beauty
You are the only one I will love
Best of all, my life
When it's you that I see
All are wiped away
The sorrows that I bear
When I remember
Of your sweet kindness
I will not forget you
Until life is gone

=== Words ===
1. I – siak, ak
2. you (singular) – sika, ka
3. he – sikato (he/she), kato
4. we – sikami, kami, mi, sikatayo, tayo, sikata, ta
5. you (plural) – sikayo, kayo, yo
6. they – sikara (sika ira)
7. this – aya
8. that – atan, aman
9. here – dia
10. there – diman, ditan
11. who – siopa, sio, si
12. what – anto
13. where – iner
14. when – kapigan, pigan
15. how – pano, panonto
16. not – ag, andi, aleg, aliwa
17. all – amin
18. many – amayamay, dakel
19. some – pigara (piga ira)
20. few – daiset
21. other – arom
22. one – isa, sakey
23. two – dua, duara (dua ira)
24. three – talo, talora (talo ira)
25. four – apat, apatira (apat ira)
26. five – lima, limara (lima ira)
27. big – baleg
28. long – andokey
29. wide – maawang, malapar
30. thick – makapal
31. heavy – ambelat
32. small – melag, melanting, tingot, daiset
33. short – melag, melanting, tingot, antikey, kulang, abeba
34. narrow – mainget
35. thin – mabeng, maimpis
36. woman – bii
37. man – laki, bolog
38. human – too
39. child – ogaw
40. wife – asawa, kaamong (spouse)
41. husband – asawa, kaamong (spouse)
42. mother – ina
43. father – ama
44. animal – ayep
45. fish – sira, ikan
46. bird – manok, siwsiw (chick)
47. dog – aso
48. louse – koto
49. snake – oleg
50. worm – bigis (germ), alumbayar (earthworm)
51. tree – kiew, tanem (plant)
52. forest – kakiewan, katakelan
53. stick – bislak, sanga
54. fruit – bunga
55. seed – bokel
56. leaf – bolong
57. root – lamot
58. bark – obak
59. flower – bulaklak, rosas
60. grass – dika
61. rope – singer, lubir, taker
62. skin – baog, katat
63. meat – laman
64. blood – dala
65. bone – pukel
66. fat (n.) – mataba, taba
67. egg – iknol
68. horn – saklor
69. tail – ikol
70. place – kulaan
71. go – laen
72. nothing – anggapo
1. feather – bago
2. hair – buek
3. head – olo
4. ear – layag
5. eye – mata
6. nose – eleng
7. mouth – sangi
8. tooth – ngipen
9. tongue – dila
10. fingernail – koko
11. foot – sali
12. leg – bikking
13. knee – pueg
14. hand – lima
15. wing – payak
16. belly – eges
17. guts – pait
18. neck – beklew
19. back – beneg
20. breast – pagew, suso
21. heart – puso
22. liver – altey
23. drink – inom
24. eat – mangan, akan, kamot
25. bite – ketket
26. suck – sepsep, suso
27. spit – lutda
28. vomit – uta
29. blow – sibok
30. breathe – engas, ingas, dongap, linawa, anges
31. laugh – elek
32. see – nengneng
33. hear – dengel
34. know – amta, kabat
35. think – nonot
36. smell – angob
37. fear – takot
38. sleep – ogip
39. live – bilay
40. die – onpatey, patey
41. kill – manpatey, patey
42. fight – laban, kolkol, bakal
43. hunt – managnop, anop, manpana, manerel (catch)
44. hit – tira, nakna, pekpek
45. cut – tegteg, sugat
46. split – pisag, puter, paldua (half)
47. stab – saksak, doyok
48. scratch – gugo, gorgor, korkor
49. dig – kotkot
50. swim – langoy
51. fly (v.) – tikyab
52. walk – akar
53. come – gala, gali, onsabi, sabi
54. lie – dokol (lie down), tila (tell a lie)
55. sit – yorong (i-orong)
56. stand – alagey
57. turn – liko, telek
58. fall – pelag (drop), tumba
59. give – iter, itdan (iteran)
60. hold – benben
61. squeeze – pespes
62. rub – kuskos, gorgor, poyok
63. wash – oras
64. wipe – ponas
65. pull – goyor
66. push – tolak
67. throw – topak
68. tie – singer
69. sew – dait
1. count – bilang
2. say – ibaga, ibagam
3. sing – togtog, kansiyon
4. play – galaw
5. float – letaw
6. flow – agos
7. freeze – kigtel
8. swell – larag
9. sun – agew, banua
10. moon – bulan
11. star – bitewen
12. water – danum
13. rain – uran
14. river – ilog, kalayan, patalan, angalakan
15. lake – look
16. sea – dayat, laot
17. salt – asin
18. stone – bato
19. sand – buer
20. dust – dabok
21. earth – dalin
22. cloud – lorem
23. fog – kelpa
24. sky – tawen
25. wind – dagem
26. snow – linew
27. ice – pakigtel
28. smoke – asewek
29. fire – apoy, pool (blaze), dalang (flame)
30. ashes – dapol
31. burn – pool, sinit
32. road – dalan, basbas (path)
33. mountain – palandey
34. red – ambalanga, pula
35. green – ampasiseng, pasiseng, birdi
36. yellow – duyaw
37. white – amputi, puti
38. black – andeket, deket
39. night – labi
40. day – agew
41. year – taon
42. hot – ampetang, petang
43. cold – ambetel, betel
44. full – napsel (napesel), napno (napano)
45. new – balo
46. old – daan
47. good – duga, maong, abig
48. bad – aliwa, maoges
49. rotten – abolok, bolok
50. dirty – maringot, dingot, marutak, dutak
51. straight – maptek, petek
52. round – malimpek, limpek, tibokel
53. sharp – matdem (matarem), tarem
54. dull – mangmang, epel
55. smooth – palanas, patad, patar
56. wet – ambasa, basa
57. dry – amaga, maga
58. correct – duga, tua (true)
59. near – asinger
60. far – arawi
61. right – kawanan
62. left – kawigi
63. at – ed
64. in – ed
65. with – iba
66. and – tan
67. if – no
68. because – ta, lapu ed
69. name – ngaran
70. smile – imis, ngiriyet
71. lolo – laki
72. lola – bai
73. beautiful – magana, masanting, marakep
74. true – tua, tod-tua
75. wrong – aliwa
76. odor – ambanget
77. delicious – masamit, mananam
78. I love you – inaro taka, inar-aro taka

1. Good day! - Maabig ya agew!
2. Good morning! - Maabig a kabuasan!
3. Good afternoon! - Maabig a ngarem!
4. Good evening! - Maabig a labi!

=== Numbers ===
List of numbers from one to ten in English, Tagalog and Pangasinan

English	Tagalog	Pangasinan
one	isa/ᜁᜐ	sakey/ᜐᜃᜒᜌ᜔
two	dalawa/ᜇᜎᜏ	duara, dua/ᜇᜓᜀᜇ᜵ᜇᜓᜀ
three	tatlo/ᜆᜆ᜔ᜎᜓ	talora, talo/ᜆᜎᜓᜇ᜵ᜆᜎᜓ
four	apat/ᜀᜉᜆ᜔	apatira, apat/ᜀᜌᜆᜒᜇ᜵ᜀᜉᜆ᜔
five	lima/ᜎᜒᜋ	limara, lima/ᜎᜒᜋᜇ᜵ᜎᜒᜋ
six	anim/ᜀᜈᜒᜋ᜔	anemira, anem/ᜀᜈᜒᜋᜒᜇ᜵ᜀᜈᜒᜋ᜔
seven	pito/ᜉᜒᜆᜓ	pitora, pito/ᜉᜒᜆᜓᜇ᜵ᜉᜒᜆᜓ
eight	walo/ᜏᜎᜓ	walora, walo/ᜏᜎᜓᜇ᜵ᜏᜎᜓ
nine	siyam/ᜐᜒᜌᜋ᜔	siamira, siam/ᜐᜒᜀᜋᜒᜇ᜵ᜐᜒᜀᜋ᜔
ten	sampu/ᜐᜋ᜔ᜉᜓ	samplora, samplo/ᜐᜋ᜔ᜉᜓᜎᜓᜇ᜵ᜐᜋ᜔ᜉᜓᜎᜓ

Cardinal numbers:

Pangasinan	English
isa, sakey, san-	one
dua, dua'ra (dua ira)	two
talo, -tlo, talo'ra (talo ira)	three
apat, -pat, apatira (apat ira)	four
lima, lima'ra (lima ira)	five
anem, -nem, anemira (anem ira)	six
pito, pito'ra (pito ira)	seven
walo, walo'ra (walo ira)	eight
siam, siamira (siam ira)	nine
polo, samplo (isa'n polo), samplo'ra (isa'n polo ira)	tens, ten
lasus, sanlasus (isa'n lasus)	hundreds, one hundred
libo, sakey libo	thousands, one thousand
laksa, sanlaksa (isa'n laksa), sakey a laksa	ten thousands, ten thousand

Ordinal numbers:

Ordinal numbers are formed with the prefix kuma- (ka- plus infix -um). Example: kumadua, 'second'.

Associative numbers:

Associative numbers are formed with the prefix ka-. Example: katlo, 'third of a group of three'.

Fractions:

Fraction numbers are formed with the prefix ka- and an associative number. Example: kakatlo, 'third part'.

Multiplicatives:

Multiplicative ordinal numbers are formed with the prefix pi- and a cardinal number from two to four or pin- for other numbers except for number one. Example: kaisa, 'first time'; pidua, 'second time'; pinlima, 'fifth time'.

Multiplicative cardinal numbers are formed with the prefix man- (mami- or mamin- for present or future tense, and ami- or amin- for the past tense) to the corresponding multiplicative ordinal number. Example: aminsan, 'once'; amidua, 'twice'; mamitlo, 'thrice'.

Distributives:

Distributive cardinal numbers are formed with the prefixes san-, tag-, or tunggal and a cardinal number. Example: sansakey, 'one each'; sanderua, 'two each'.

Distributive multiplicative numbers are formed with the prefixes magsi-, tunggal, or balangsakey and a multiplicative cardinal number. Example: tunggal pamidua, 'twice each'; magsi-pamidua, 'each twice'.

== Dictionaries and further reading ==
The following is a list of some dictionaries and references:

- Fernández Cosgaya, Lorenzo (1865). Diccionario pangasinan-español and Vocabulario Hispano-pangasinán. Colegio de Santo Tomás – via University of Michigan's Humanities Text Initiative.
- Macaraeg, Anastacio Austria (1898). Vocabulario castellano-pangasinán.
- Pellicer, Mariano (1904). Arte de la lengua pangasinán o caboloan.
- Rayner, Ernest Adolphus (1923). Grammar and dictionary of the Pangasinan language / Gramatica tan diccionario na salitay Pangasinan. Manila, Philippines: Methodist Publishing House.
- Viray, Felixberto B. (1927). The Sounds and Sound Symbols of the Pangasinan Language. Manila: University of the Philippines.
- Corporación de PP. Dominicos (1951). Pasion Na Cataoan Tin JesuChristo. U.S.T. Press.
- Schachter, Paul Morris (1960). A Contrastive Analysis of English and Pangasinan (Thesis). Los Angeles: University of California. OCLC 500620511.
- Versoza, Paciencia E. (1977). Stress and Intonation Difficulties of Pangasinan Learners of English (Philippine Normal College thesis). OCLC 4736102.
- Benton, Richard A. (1971). Pangasinan Dictionary. Honolulu: University of Hawaii Press. OCLC 1123520882.
- Benton, Richard A. (1971). Pangasinan Reference Grammar. Honolulu: University of Hawaii Press. ISBN 9780824879105.
- Benton, Richard A. (1971). Spoken Pangasinan. Honolulu: University of Hawaii Press. ISBN 9780870220739.
- Benton, Richard A. (1972). Phonotactics of Pangasinan. Honolulu: University of Hawaii Press. OCLC 16326646.
- Constantino, Ernesto (1975). English-Pangasinan Dictionary.
- Silverio, Julio F. (1976). New English-Pilipino-Pangasinan Dictionary. Manila: National Book Store. OCLC 3371251.
- Garcia, Alta Grace Q. (1981). Morphological Analysis of English and Pangasinan Verbs. Manila: Rex Book Store. OCLC 989412334.
- Say Santa Biblia (in Pangasinan). Manila: Philippine Bible Society. 1982. ISBN 9789712900228.
- Maung A Balita Para Sayan Panaon Tayo (in Pangasinan). Philippine Bible Society and United Bible Societies. 1983. OCLC 54302118.
- Watchtower Bible and Tract Society of Pennsylvania (2015). Balon Mundo a Patalos na Masanton Kasulatan. Watchtower Bible and Tract Society of Pennsylvania.
- Tungol, Mario "Guese" (1993). Modern English-Filipino Pangasinan Dictionary. Manila: Merriam Webster. OCLC 70045401.
- Church of Christ (n.d.). Say Cancanta. Includes translations of English songs like "Joy to the World," and "What A Friend We Have in Jesus."
- Jovellanos, Emiliano (2002). Pangasinan-English English-Pangasinan Dictionary. The compilation has 20,000 entries.
- Jovellanos, Mel V. (March 2007). Pangasinan-English English-Pangasinan Language Dictionary (in Pangasinan). Calasiao: Corpuz Press.
- Rosario Jr., F. C. (2012). "The Vowel Space of Pangasinan". Frontiers of Language and Teaching. 3.
- Malinak Lay Labi [Calm is the Night] (in Pangasinan). Traditional folk song.

== See also ==
- Languages of the Philippines
- Malayo-Polynesian
- Pangasinan
- Tarlac
- La Union
- Pangasinan literature
