= Tarlac =

Province in Central Luzon, Philippines

- Province
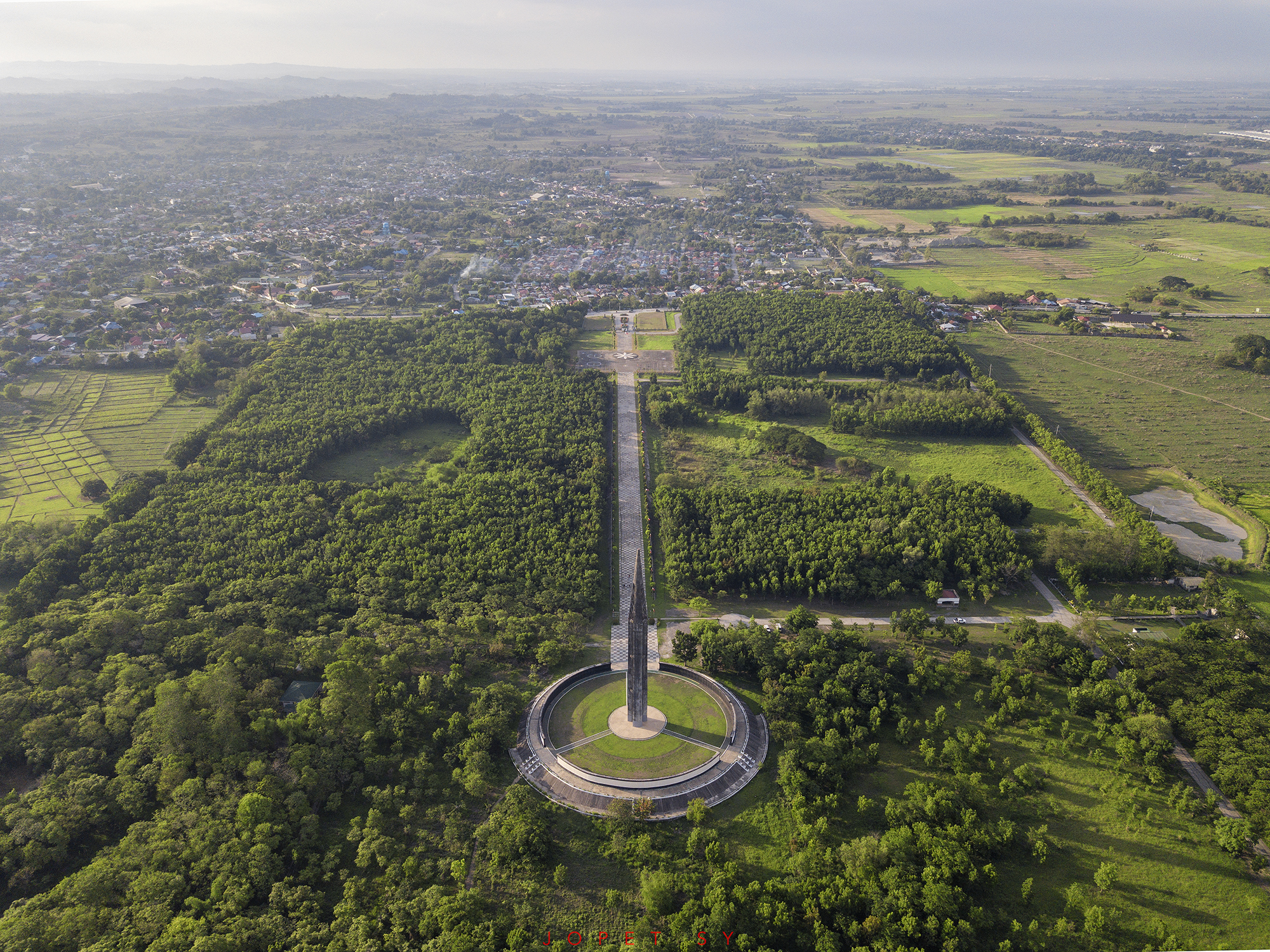
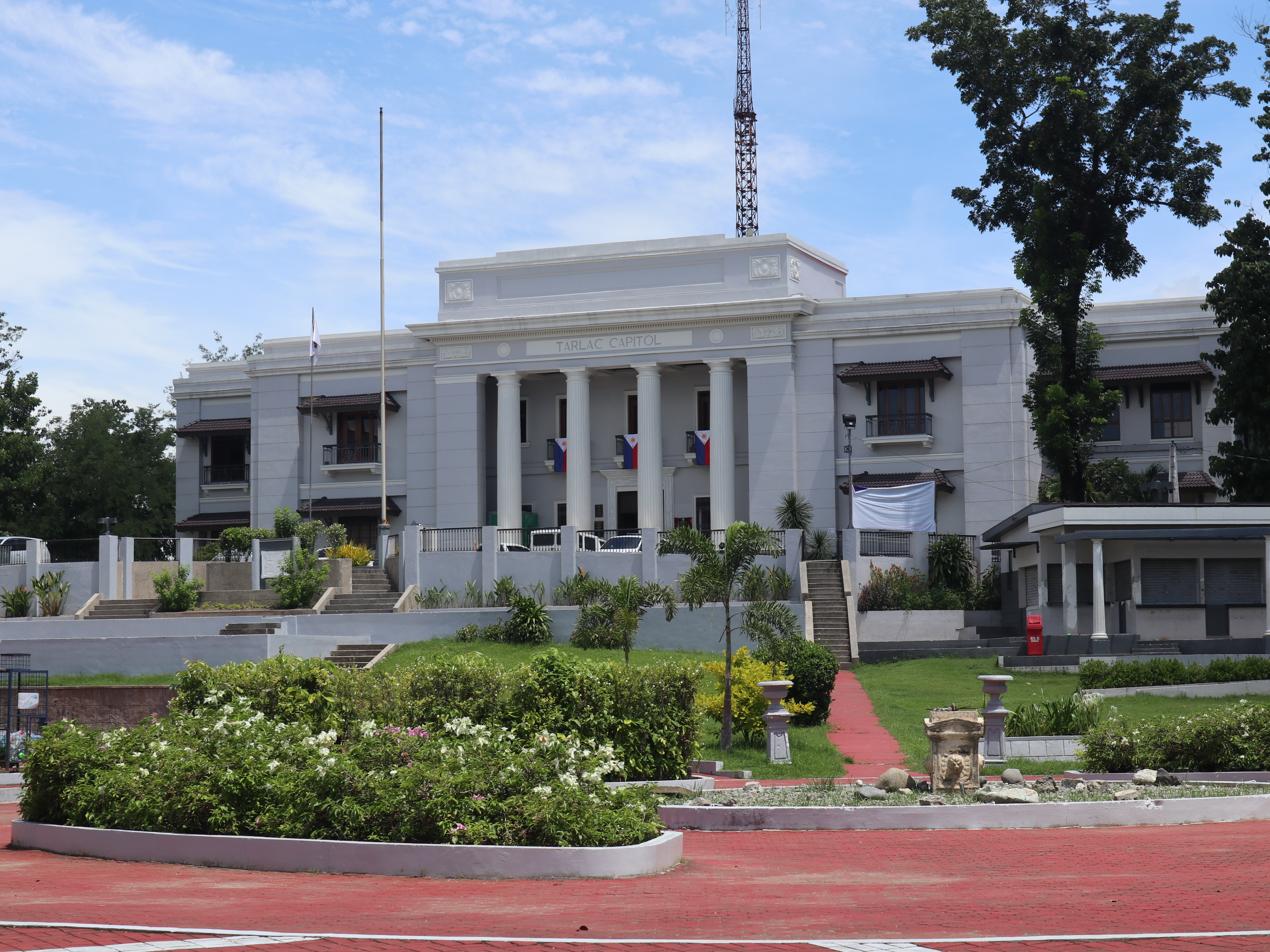
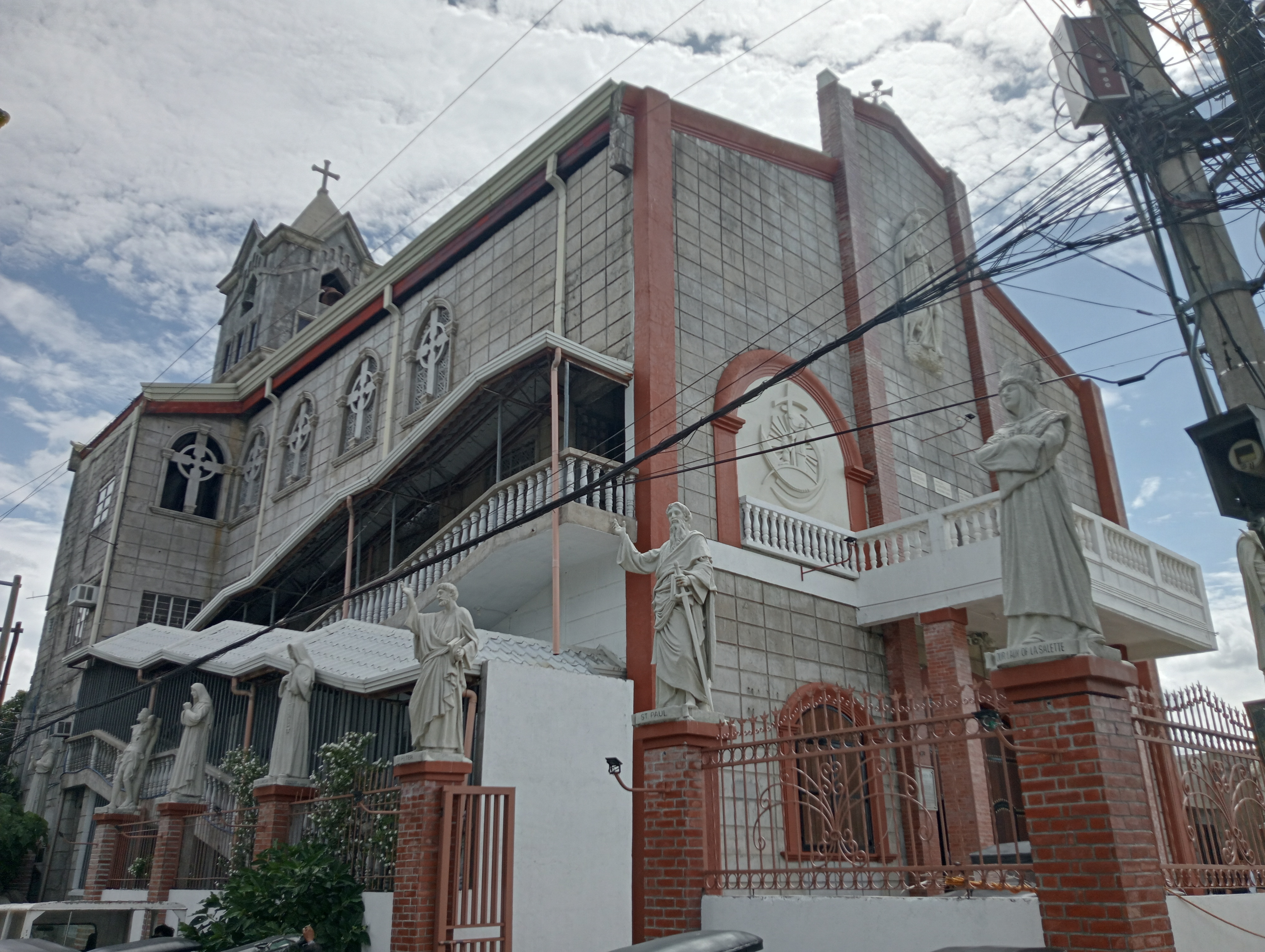
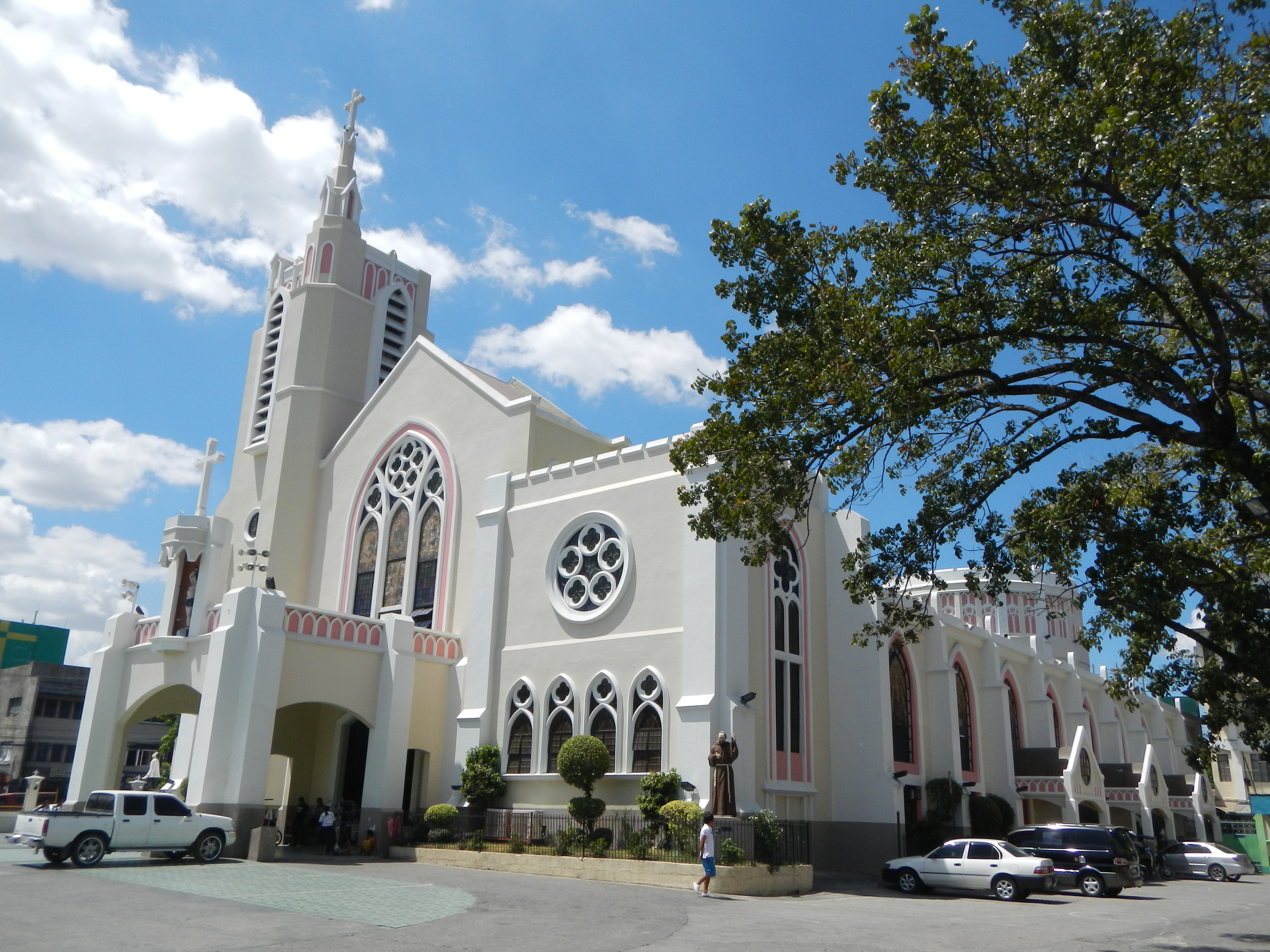
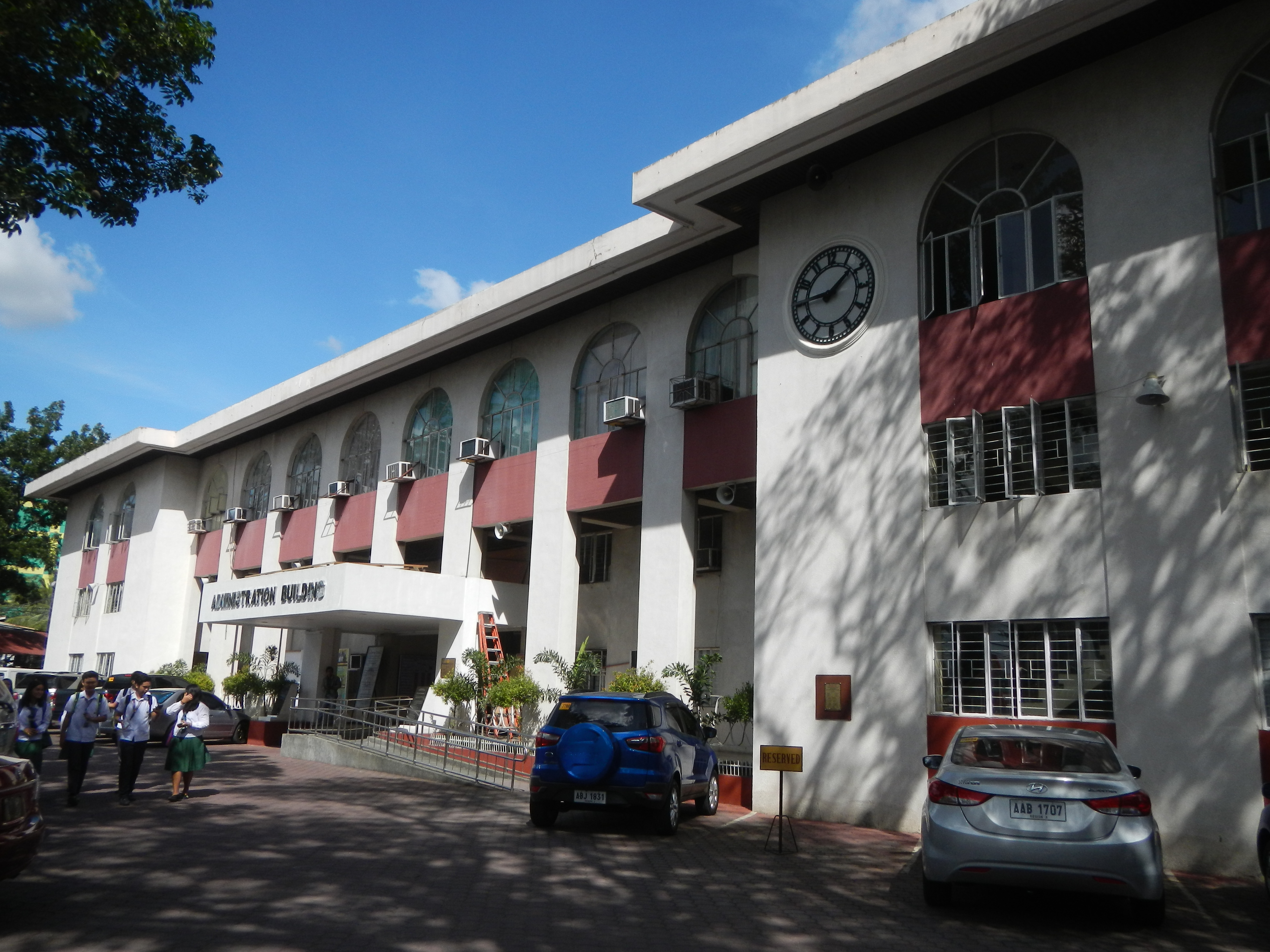
- (from top: left to right) Capas National Shrine, Tarlac Provincial Capitol, San Roque Church, Tarlac Cathedral, and Tarlac State University

- Flag Seal
- Nickname: Melting Pot of Central Luzon
- Anthem: Awit ng Tarlac
- Location within the Philippines
- Interactive map of Tarlac
- Coordinates: 15°30′N 120°30′E
- Country: Philippines
- Region: Central Luzon
- Founded: 28 May 1873
- Capital and largest city: Tarlac City

Government
  - Type: Sangguniang Panlalawigan
  - Governor: Christian Tell A. Yap (SST)
  - Vice Governor: Estelita M. Aquino (NPC)
  - Legislature: Tarlac Provincial Board
  - Electorate: 936,003 voters (2025)

Area
  - Total: 3,053.60 km^{2} (1,179.00 sq mi)
  - Rank: 45th out of 82
- Highest elevation (Mount Iba): 1,655 m (5,430 ft)

Population (2024 census)
  - Total: 1,568,162
  - Rank: 18th out of 82
  - Density: 513.545/km^{2} (1,330.08/sq mi)
  - Rank: 13th out of 82
  - Households: 359,561
- Demonyms: Tarlacqueño (m/n); Tarlacqueña (f); Tarlacense

Divisions
  - Independent cities: 0
  - Component cities: 1: Tarlac City
  - Municipalities: 17: Anao; Bamban; Camiling; Capas; Concepcion; Gerona; La Paz; Mayantoc; Moncada; Paniqui; Pura; Ramos; San Clemente; San Jose; San Manuel; Santa Ignacia; Victoria
  - Barangays: 511
  - Districts: Legislative districts of Tarlac

Economy
  - Income class: 1st provincial income class
  - Poverty incidence: 6.7% (2023)
  - Revenue: ₱ 3,470 million (2024)
  - Assets: ₱ 18,715 million (2024)
  - Expenditure: ₱ 2,906 million (2024)
  - Liabilities: ₱ 4,068 million (2024)
- Time zone: UTC+8 (PST)
- PSGC: 0306900000
- IDD : area code: +63 (0)45
- ISO 3166 code: PH-TAR
- Ethnic groups: Kapampangan (43%); Ilocano (40%); Tagalog (12%); Pangasinan (0.01%)
- Spoken languages: Kapampangan; Ilocano; Pangasinan; Tagalog; English
- Website: www.tarlac.gov.ph

Tarlac, officially the Province of Tarlac (Kapampangan: Lalawigan ning Tarlac; Pangasinan: Luyag na Tarlac; Ilocano: Probinsia ti Tarlac; Tagalog: Lalawigan ng Tarlac; [tɐɾˈlak]), is a landlocked province in the Philippines located in the Central Luzon region. It had a population of 1,503,456 people according to the 2020 census. Its capital is the city of Tarlac, which is the most populous in the province. It is bounded on the north by the province of Pangasinan, Nueva Ecija on the east, Zambales on the west, and Pampanga in the south. The province comprises three congressional districts and is subdivided into 17 municipalities and one city, Tarlac City, which is the provincial capital.

The province is situated in the heartland of Luzon, in what is known as the Central Plain also spanning the neighbouring provinces of Pampanga, Pangasinan, Nueva Ecija, and Zambales. Tarlac covers a total land area of 3,053.45 km^{2} (305,345 ha).

Early in history, what came to be known as Valenzuela Ranch today was once a thickly forested area, peopled by roving tribes of nomadic Aetas who are said to be the aboriginal settlers of the Philippines, and for a lengthy period, it was the remaining hinterland of Luzon's Central Plains. Today, Tarlac is one of the most multi-cultural provinces in the region for having a mixture of four distinct ethnic groups: the Kapampangans, the Pangasinans, the Ilocanos, and the Tagalogs. It is also known for its fine food and vast sugar and rice plantations in Central Luzon.

== History ==
=== Spanish colonial era ===
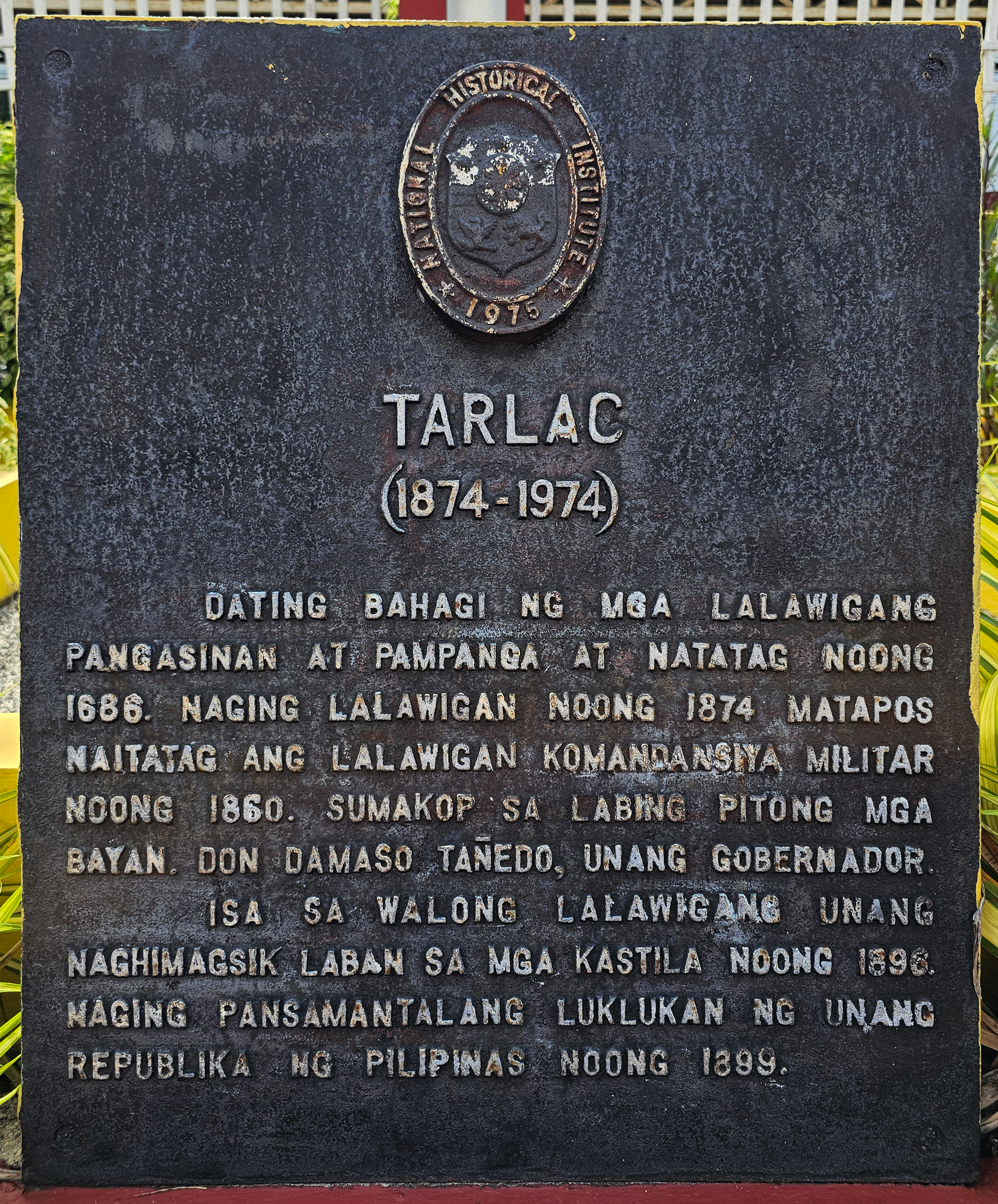
National historical marker commemorating the province installed in the main campus of Tarlac State University in 1975

Tarlac's name is a Hispanized derivation from a talahib weed called tarlak, an Aeta term. The area around the current capital city was described as matarlak or malatarlak, a word meaning "abundant with tarlak grass." Tarlac was originally divided into two parts: the southern division belonging to Pampanga and the northern division belonging to Pangasinan; the province was named after the present capital city. It was the last province in Central Luzon to be organized under the Spanish colonial administration in 1874. Its nucleus were the towns of Concepcion, Capas, Bamban, Mabalacat, Magalang, Porac, Floridablanca, Victoria, and Tarlac which constituted a military comandancia. Some of these municipalities were returned to Pampanga but the rest were incorporated into the new province of Tarlac.

Unlike other provinces in Central Luzon, Tarlac was relatively free from revolts during the Spanish regime before the late 1800s rose. Only the rebellion started by Juan de la Cruz Palaris in Pangasinan spread to the northern portion of Tarlac.

==== Philippine revolution ====
During the Philippine Revolution of 1896, Tarlac was among the first eight provinces to rise against Spain, alongside neighbouring Pampanga. It became the new seat of the first Philippine Republic in March 1899 when General Emilio Aguinaldo abandoned the former capital, Malolos, Bulacan. This lasted only for a month before the seat was moved to Nueva Ecija in Aguinaldo's attempt to elude the pursuing Americans.

=== American colonial era ===
On October 23, 1899, Gregorio Aglipay, military vicar general of the revolutionary forces, called the Filipino clergy to a conference in Paniqui. There, they drafted the constitution of the Philippine Independent Church. They called for the Filipinization of the clergy, which eventually led to a separation from the Roman Catholic Church in the Philippines.

Tarlac was captured by American forces in November 1899. A civil government was established in the province in 1901.

=== Japanese occupation ===
During World War II, Camp O'Donnell in Capas became the terminal point of the infamous Bataan Death March of Filipino and American soldiers who surrendered at Bataan on April 9, 1942. Many prisoners died of hunger, disease and/or execution. The general headquarters of the Philippine Commonwealth Army was established from January 3, 1942, to June 30, 1946, and the 3rd Constabulary Regiment of the Philippine Constabulary was founding again from October 28, 1944, to June 30, 1946, and military stationed in the province of Tarlac and some parts in Central Luzon due to Japanese occupation. Local troops of the Philippine Commonwealth Army units sent the clearing military operations in the province of Tarlac and Central Luzon from 1942 to 1945 and aided them by the recognized guerrilla groups including Hukbalahap Communist fighters and attacking Japanese Imperial forces. But in the aftermath, some local guerrilla resistance fighters and Hukbahalap groups became retreating Imperial Japanese troops around the province and before the liberation from the Allied forces.

In early 1945, combined American and Filipino military forces with the recognized Aringay Command guerrillas liberated Camp O'Donnell. The raid in Capas resulted in the rescue of American, Filipino and other allied Prisoners of War.

From January 20, 1945, to August 15, 1945, Tarlac was recaptured by combined Filipino and American troops together with the recognized guerrilla fighters against the Japanese Imperial forces during the liberation and beginning for the Battle of Tarlac under the Luzon Campaign.

=== Postwar era ===
After the social and economic upheavals of the war and with government institutions still in their nascent form after the recognition of Philippine Independence by the international community, the first few decades after the end of the war were marked by dissatisfaction and social tension. In the largely agricultural context of Central Luzon and Tarlac those tensions tended to coalesce around the interrelated issues of land ownership, and the working conditions of agricultural workers.

The Filipino communist Hukbalahap guerrilla movement formed by the farmers of Central Luzon to fight the Japanese occupation, had found themselves sidelined by the new post-independence Philippine government which had taken up the fear of communist influence which marked the beginning of the cold war in the west. So they decided to extended their fight into a rebellion against the new government, only to be put down through a series of reforms and military victories by Defense Secretary, and later President, Ramon Magsaysay.

Ultimately more effective than those who took up arms were the numerous political and labor movements who kept working towards agricultural land reform and stronger labor rights, with laborers' and farmers' protests gathering enough steam that several Philippine presidents were forced to meet with them and then concede to their demands. Among the most successful of these were the Land Justice March of the political group known as the Filipino Agrarian Reform Movement (FARM), which intended to march from Tarlac to Malacañang in 1969, although President Marcos was forced to give in to their demands early, meeting them while they were still at Camp Servillano Aquino in Tarlac City itself.

=== Martial law era ===
The beginning months of the 1970s marked a period of turmoil and change in the Philippines, as well as in Tarlac. During his bid to be the first Philippine president to be re-elected for a second term, Ferdinand Marcos launched an unprecedented number of foreign debt-funded public works projects. This caused the Philippine economy took a sudden downwards turn known as the 1969 Philippine balance of payments crisis, which in turn led to a period of economic difficulty and a significant rise of social unrest.

With only a year left in his last constitutionally allowed term as president Ferdinand Marcos placed the Philippines under Martial Law in September 1972 and thus retained the position for fourteen more years. This period in Philippine history is remembered for the Marcos administration's record of human rights abuses, particularly targeting political opponents, student activists, journalists, religious workers, farmers, and others who fought against the Marcos dictatorship. At least two major military camps in Tarlac were used as detention centers for political detainees in Tarlac: Camp Servillano Aquino and Camp Macabulos, both in Tarlac City. They were part of Regional Command for Detainees II (RECAD II) and administered under Camp Olivas in Pampanga.

Martial Law had immediate political impacts in Tarlac, since political leaders who were critical of Marcos were immediately jailed. This included Senator and Concepcion native Ninoy Aquino, and Bamban Mayor Pedro D. Mendiola who was imprisoned in Camp Crame. Other Tarlaqueño Marcos critics who had roles in government, such as Development Academy of the Philippines (DAP) executive vice president Horacio Morales, tried to stay so they could pursue change from within, but eventually could not reconcile themselves with the idea of working within the dictatorship. Ordinary Tarlaqueños also resisted the dictatorship. Former Seminarian Teresito Sison campaigned for the rights of teachers, farmers, and of laborers in Clark Air Base, but torture during two stints in Marcos' detention centers caused a decline in his health until he died in 1980. Tarlaqueno activists decided to take up arms against the dicgtatorhip, including Eduardo Aquino, Merardo Arce, and Benedicto Pasetes were killed in various encounters with Marcos' forces.

Ninoy Aquino was eventually assassinated in August 1983, igniting protests throughout the Philippines which would eventually force Marcos to announce a snap election in February 1986. Even then, those who resisted Marcos were targeted for death, such as in the case of oppositionist campaign organizer Jeremias De Jesus political organizer, who was assassinated shortly before the elections

==== Tarlac's toll in the Martial Law era ====
In the decade preceding the declaration of Martial Law in 1972, Tarlac was a center of intense social tensions that arose from agrarian inequality, peasant organizing, and political opposition. After World War II, the province experienced institutional development with the establishment of educational institutions, such as the Bamban Institute (1949) and San Roque High School (1968), while rural communities continued to suffer from land ownership and labor conditions. Agricultural workers in Hacienda Luisita were organized by peasant leaders like Teresito "Sito" Sison who fought for fair wages and agrarian reform.

Tarlac also became the nucleus of armed resistance. The New People’s Army (NPA), the armed wing of the Communist Party of the Philippines, was formally organized in Barrio Sta. on March 29, 1969. Rita, Tarlac, Capas. The province was also a bastion of political opposition to President Ferdinand Marcos, led by such figures as former Tarlac Governor and Senator Benigno Aquino Jr. and Bamban Mayor Pedro D. Mendiola.

After the declaration of Martial Law in September 1972, Tarlac experienced military crackdowns. Sito Sison and Mayor Mendiola were arrested, along with other political leaders and activists. Detention and interrogation were conducted at local military bases. Hundreds of political prisoners were detained at Camp Servillano Aquino in Tarlac City, while Camp Macabulos has been associated with the detention and torture of activists, as well as the 1973 killing of activist Eduardo "Ed" Aquino. The local press was also deeply affected by the state censorship that limited the selection of news and the flow of information in the province.

=== Contemporary ===
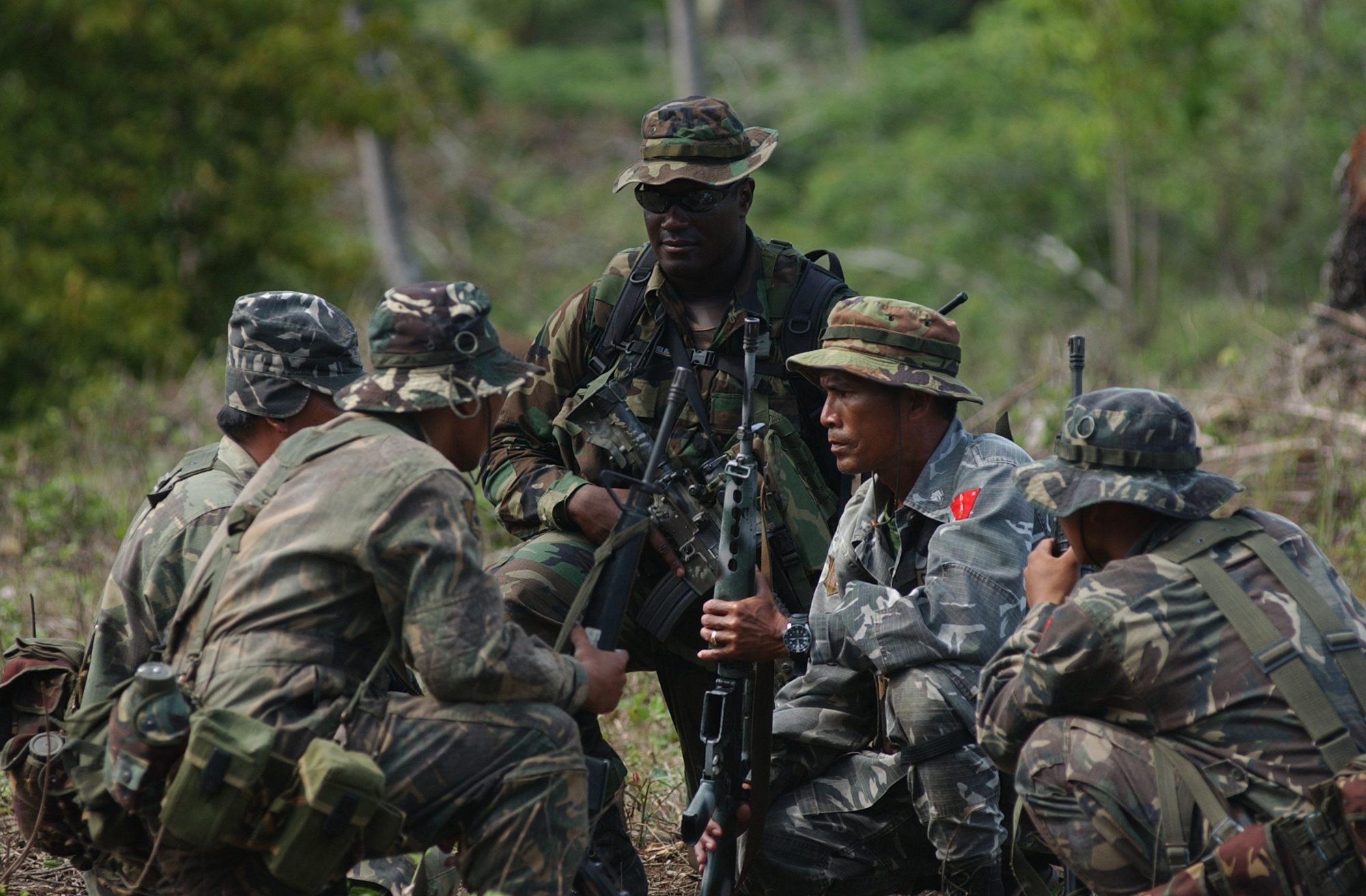
United States and Philippine troops during a military exercise in Crow Valley, Tarlac

==== Military testing ground ====
The Philippine Army has used Crow Valley in the borders of Barangay Patling and Santa Lucia in Capas, Tarlac as a testing ground for both Philippine forces and allies. Many of the Philippine military testings were done on March 17, 2006, most likely as a part of Operation Enduring Freedom - Philippines.

Tarlac plays a big role in the annual joint Balikatan Exercise as it is a main exercise ground of the US and Philippine Army.

The exercise in Tarlac conducts Combat exercise including Aviation, Artillery and Small Arms training. It is conducted in Crow Valley in Capas, Tarlac. Since 2022 with more than 10,000+ Military Personnel and increasing.

== Geography ==
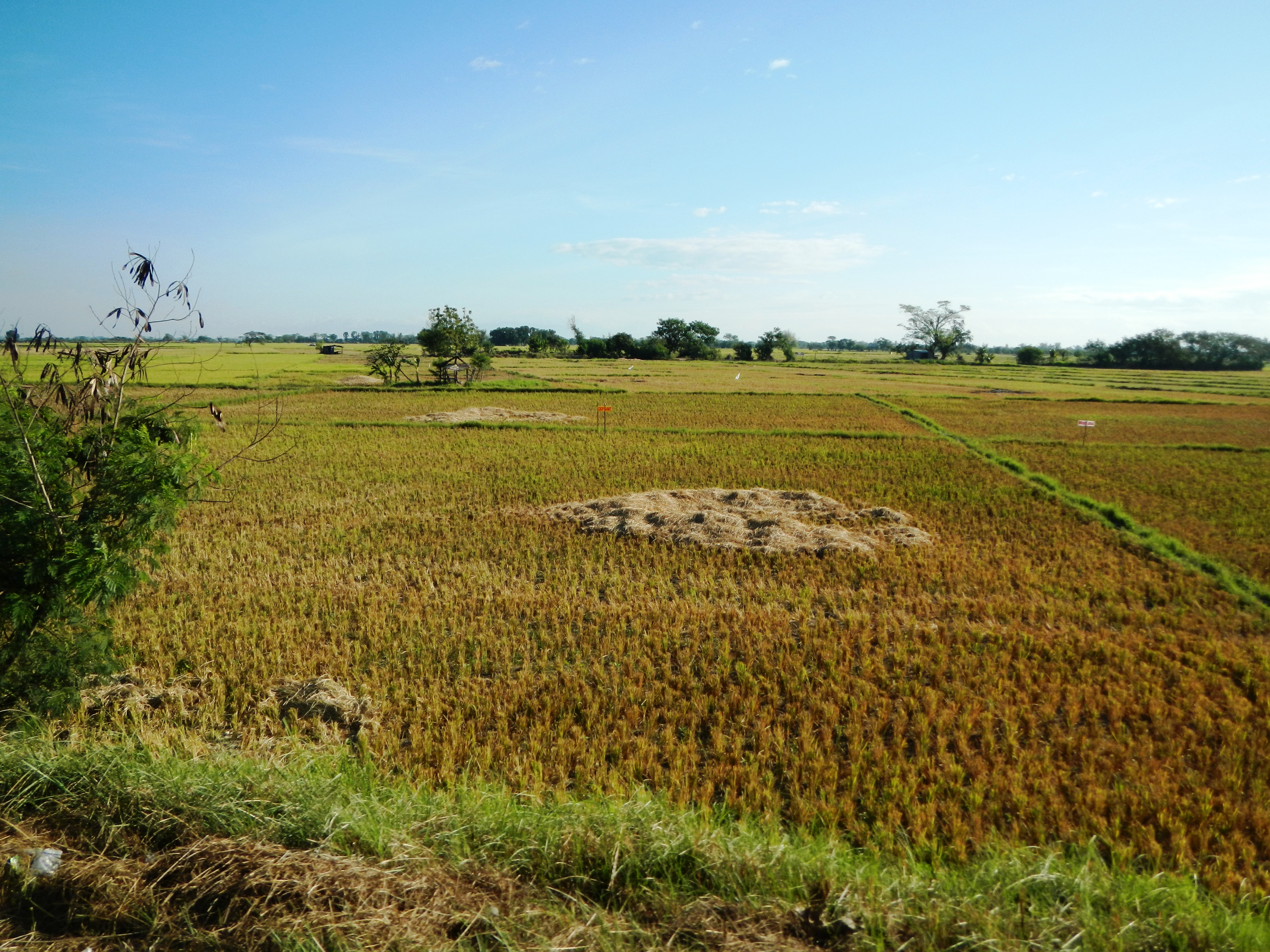
Landscape along Tarlac City

The landlocked province is situated at the center of the central plains of Luzon, landlocked by four provinces: Pampanga on the south, Nueva Ecija on the east, Pangasinan on the north, and Zambales on the west. The province covers a total area of 3,053.60 square kilometres (1,179.00 sq mi). Approximately 75% of the province is plains while the western side is hilly to slightly mountainous.

The province includes a large portion of mountains like Mt. Telakawa (Straw Hat Mountain), located at Capas, Tarlac. Mt. Bueno, Mt. Mor-Asia and Mt. Canouman are also located in Capas as well as Mt. Dalin. The other mountains are Mt. Dueg and Mt. Maasin, found in the municipality of San Clemente. Also noted are Mt. Damas of Camiling. A portion of Mount Pinatubo (whose summit crater rests in neighbouring Zambales) also rests in Bamban and Capas. The whole of Mayantoc and San Jose are mountainous so it is suitable for the highest natural resources and forest products in the province such as coal, iron, copper, temperate-climate fruits and vegetables, fire logs, sand, rocks and forest animals such as wild boar and deer. The main water sources for agriculture include the Tarlac River at Tarlac City, the Lucong and Parua rivers in Concepcion, Sacobia-Bamban River in Bamban and the Rio Chico in La Paz.

=== Administrative divisions ===
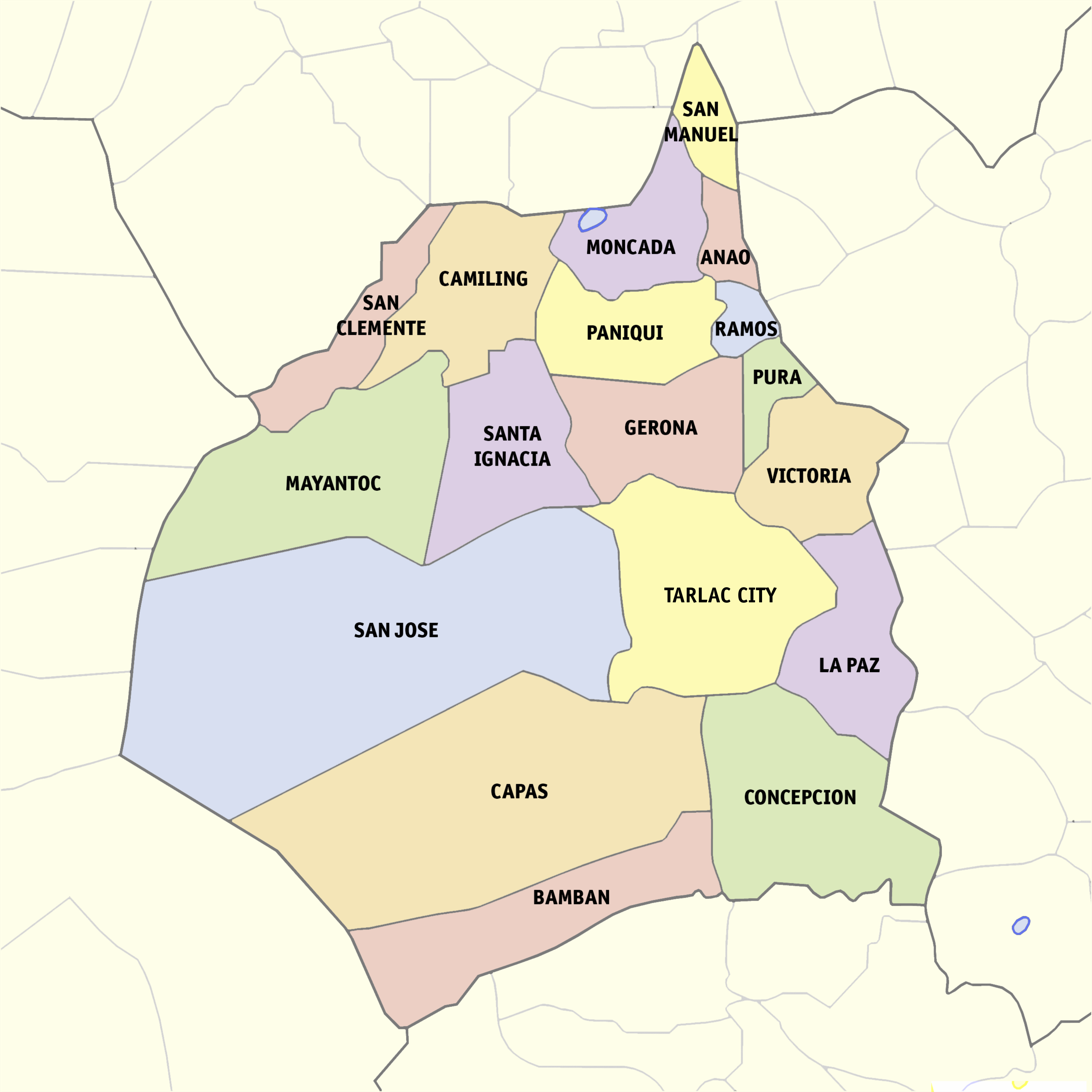
Political map of Tarlac

Tarlac is subdivided into 17 municipalities and one component city, all encompassed by three congressional districts. There are a total of 511 barangays comprising the province.

City or municipality		District	Population			±% p.a.	Area		Density		Barangay	Coordinates^{[A]}
			(2020)		(2015)		km^{2}	sq mi	/km^{2}	/sq mi		
Anao		1st	0.8%	12,208	11,528	+1.10%	23.87	9.22	510	1,300	18	15°43′45″N 120°37′41″E
Bamban		3rd	5.2%	78,260	69,466	+2.30%	251.98	97.29	310	800	15	15°16′24″N 120°34′00″E
Camiling		1st	5.8%	87,319	83,248	+0.91%	140.53	54.26	620	1,600	61	15°41′19″N 120°24′50″E
Capas		3rd	10.4%	156,056	140,202	+2.06%	377.60	145.79	410	1,100	20	15°20′10″N 120°35′24″E
Concepcion		3rd	11.3%	169,953	154,188	+1.87%	234.67	90.61	720	1,900	45	15°19′27″N 120°39′19″E
Gerona		2nd	6.3%	94,485	87,531	+1.47%	128.89	49.76	730	1,900	44	15°36′25″N 120°35′55″E
La Paz		3rd	4.6%	68,952	64,017	+1.42%	114.33	44.14	600	1,600	21	15°26′28″N 120°43′44″E
Mayantoc		1st	2.2%	32,597	32,232	+0.21%	311.42	120.24	100	260	24	15°37′09″N 120°22′47″E
Moncada		1st	4.2%	62,819	57,787	+1.60%	85.75	33.11	730	1,900	37	15°44′01″N 120°34′21″E
Paniqui		1st	6.9%	103,003	92,606	+2.05%	105.16	40.60	980	2,500	35	15°40′07″N 120°35′09″E
Pura		1st	1.7%	25,781	23,712	+1.61%	31.01	11.97	830	2,100	16	15°37′25″N 120°38′49″E
Ramos		1st	1.5%	22,879	21,350	+1.33%	24.40	9.42	940	2,400	9	15°39′57″N 120°38′23″E
San Clemente		1st	0.9%	13,181	12,657	+0.78%	49.73	19.20	270	700	12	15°42′41″N 120°21′39″E
San Jose		2nd	2.7%	41,182	36,253	+2.46%	592.81	228.89	69	180	13	15°27′28″N 120°28′06″E
San Manuel		1st	1.9%	28,387	25,504	+2.06%	42.10	16.25	670	1,700	15	15°47′56″N 120°36′24″E
Santa Ignacia		1st	3.4%	51,626	47,538	+1.58%	146.07	56.40	350	910	24	15°36′54″N 120°26′11″E
Tarlac City∞	†	2nd	25.6%	385,398	342,493	+2.27%	274.66	106.05	1,400	3,600	76	15°29′09″N 120°35′22″E
Victoria		2nd	4.6%	69,370	63,715	+1.63%	111.51	43.05	620	1,600	26	15°34′37″N 120°40′52″E
Total				1,503,456	1,366,027	+1.84%	3,046.49	1,176.26	490	1,300	511	(see GeoGroup box)
† Provincial capital and component city Municipality A. Coordinates mark the city/town center, and are sortable by latitude.

∞ Largest settlement

=== Barangays ===
The 17 municipalities and 1 city of the province comprise a total of 511 barangays, with Cristo Rey in Capas as the most populous in 2010, and Malonzo in Bamban as the least.

=== Climate ===
Like the rest of Central Luzon, the province has three distinct seasons: summer from March to June, monsoon rain from July to early October, and monsoon winter from late October to February. Summer months, especially during May bring severe thunderstorms with high winds, lightnings, and hails. It is the coldest province in the region, with a yearly average of 23 °C (73 °F). Cold spell is not common, which gradually receives unusual average temperature of 17 °C (63 °F), while the maximum daytime peaks at 27 °C (81 °F). It is also the windiest province in the region during February and March due to its widely lowland altitude and extreme climate transition. The lowest temperature ever recorded is 11.2 °C (52.2 °F) and the highest temperature is at 38.8 °C (101.8 °F). Aside air temperature, heat index is the most common calculated temperature during extreme weather observances especially dry season. The province usually experiences a maximum heat index ranging from 40 °C (104 °F) to 50 °C (122 °F) based on the forecasts reported by Philippine Atmospheric Geophysical and Astronomical Services Administration.

Climate data for Tarlac
Month	Jan	Feb	Mar	Apr	May	Jun	Jul	Aug	Sep	Oct	Nov	Dec	Year
Mean daily maximum °C (°F)	32.1 (89.8)	32.8 (91.0)	34.4 (93.9)	36.2 (97.2)	35.3 (95.5)	34.0 (93.2)	32.8 (91.0)	32.1 (89.8)	32.4 (90.3)	32.8 (91.0)	32.7 (90.9)	32.0 (89.6)	33.3 (91.9)
Mean daily minimum °C (°F)	21.1 (70.0)	21.6 (70.9)	22.7 (72.9)	23.8 (74.8)	24.6 (76.3)	24.5 (76.1)	24.2 (75.6)	24.4 (75.9)	24.1 (75.4)	23.7 (74.7)	22.9 (73.2)	21.9 (71.4)	23.3 (73.9)
Average rainy days	1	2	2	3	13	16	22	21	20	10	8	4	122
Source: Storm247

== Demographics ==
Population census of Tarlac

Year	Pop.	±% p.a.
1903	135,107	—
1918	171,876	+1.62%
1939	264,379	+2.07%
1948	327,018	+2.39%
1960	426,647	+2.24%
1970	559,708	+2.75%

Year	Pop.	±% p.a.
1975	640,899	+2.75%
1980	688,457	+1.44%
1990	859,708	+2.25%
1995	945,810	+1.80%
2000	1,068,783	+2.65%
2007	1,243,449	+2.11%

Year	Pop.	±% p.a.
2010	1,273,240	+0.87%
2015	1,366,027	+1.35%
2020	1,503,456	+2.04%
2024	1,568,162	+1.02%

Source: Philippine Statistics Authority

The population of Tarlac in the 2024 census was 1,568,162 people, with a density of 510 inhabitants per square kilometre or 1,300 inhabitants per square mile.

There are two predominant ethnic groups in the province: the Kapampangans that mainly predominate the province's southern portion and the Ilocanos that mainly predominate the province's northern portion. Both ethno-linguistic groups intermingle together in the provincial capital. The Tagalogs and Pangasinans constitute the rest of the provincial populace; Tagalogs arrived from Nueva Ecija and Bulacan, others from Zambales, Bataan, and Aurora, most of them live at the boundary with Nueva Ecija.

=== Language ===
Kapampangan and Ilocano are mainly used throughout the entire province, as well as Pangasinan and Tagalog. Ilocanos and Tagalogs however, speak their respective languages with a Kapampangan/Pangasinan accent, as descendants of Ilocanos and Tagalogs from the first generations who lived in the province learned Kapampangan and/or Pangasinan. Ethnic groups who grew up within environment of other ethnic group also speak other native languages as second languages, like Kapampangans who grew up within an Ilocano or Pangasinan population speak Ilocano or Pangasinan. Filipino is spoken as lingua franca between different languages. English is widely spoken and understood as well, especially in professional and educational establishments.

Languages spoken in Tarlac
Language	Percentage of native speakers
Kapampangan	43.1%
Ilocano	39.8%
Tagalog	12.1%
Pangasinan	0.01%
Others	2.1%

=== Religion ===
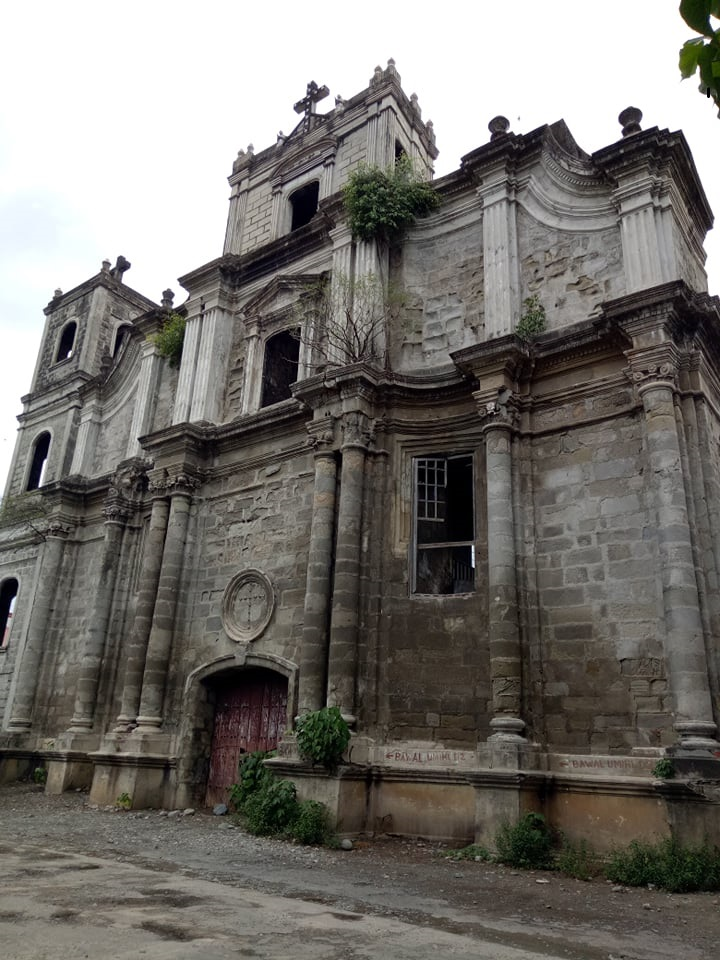
The Old St. Michael the Archangel Parish Church was burned in 1997.

Spanish influence is very visible in the province as shown by religious adherence. Roman Catholicism is professed by 80%-83% of the population. Protestant groups are also present such as evangelicals forming 5% of the province population. The St. Michael Archangel Parish Church in Camiling was the oldest religious structure in the entire province until it burned down in 1997.

According to the 2010 Census, other prominent Christian groups include the Iglesia ni Cristo (7.43%) it has three subdivided districts (Capas, Paniqui and Tarlac) in the Church has numerous locales and barangay chapels for the growing numbers of worshippers, Aglipayan Church (2.24%), Evangelicals (1.97%), Jehovah's Witnesses (0.64%) and others.

Muslims, anitists, animists, and atheists are also present in the province.

== Economy ==
Poverty incidence of Tarlac (%)

Source: Philippine Statistics Authority

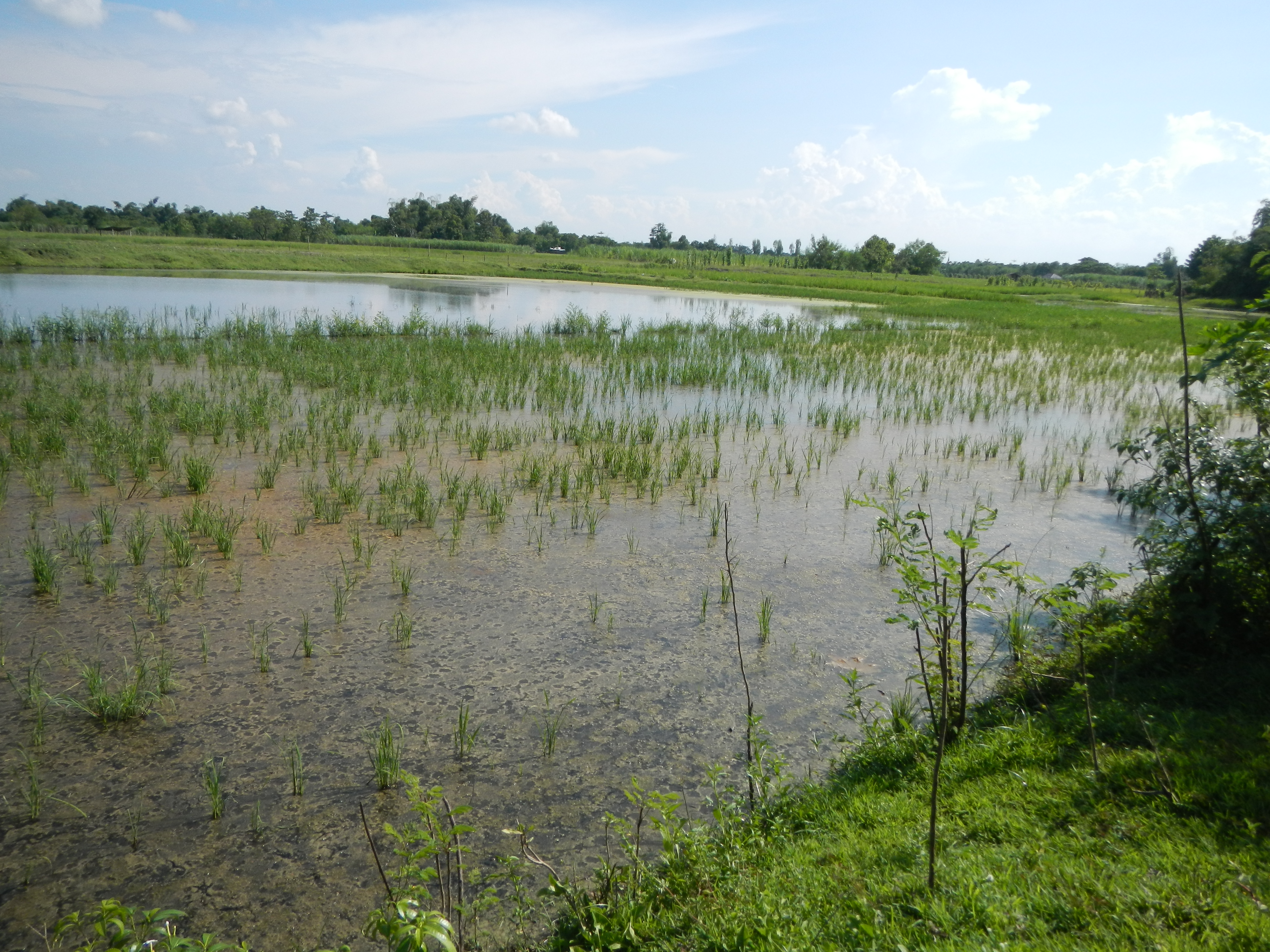
Rice plantations in Gerona

The economy of Tarlac is predominantly agricultural. It is among the biggest producers of rice and sugarcane (the principal crops) in Central Luzon. Other major crops are corn and coconuts, fruits (bananas, calamansi and mangoes) and vegetables (eggplants, garlic and onions).

Because the province is landlocked, its fish production is limited to fishpens, but it has vast river systems and irrigation. On the Zambales boundary to its west, forest land provides timber for the logging industry. Mineral reserves such as manganese and iron can also be found along the western section.

Tarlac has its own rice and corn mills, sawmills and logging outfits. It has three sugar-refining centrals and hosts many sugar products in Central Luzon, especially the Muscovado sugar of the municipality of Victoria. Other firms service agricultural needs such as fertilizers. Among its cottage industries, ceramics has become available because of the abundant supply of clay. Some of the major industries here involve making chicharon (pork skin chips) and iniruban in the municipality of Camiling and Ilang-Ilang products of Anao. Tilapia production is also improving in Tarlac, with an aim to make the province the second "tilapia capital of Central Luzon" after its mother province, Pampanga.

In recent years, Tarlac has seen an increase in commercial rooftop solar installations across manufacturing plants, agricultural facilities, and commercial buildings to help reduce energy costs and improve sustainability. A notable example is the 99.68 kWp rooftop solar photovoltaic system commissioned in March 2018 at the Tarlac Provincial Hospital. The system is monitored via the Sunny Portal platform and produces about 129,584 kWh annually, offsetting approximately 122.5 tons of CO₂ each year.

== Culture ==
As mentioned above, Tarlaqueño culture is a mixture of Kapampangan, Pangasinense, Ilokano, Tagalog, and Aeta cultures within the province. A melting pot of culture, the province has a varied of festivals, traditions, and beliefs that constitute Tarlaqueño heritage, along with tangible heritage structures, scenes, and objects.

=== Belenismo sa Tarlac ===
Belenismo sa Tarlac was launched by Isabel Cojuangco-Suntay, sister of former Ambassador Eduardo Cojuangco Jr., to transform the province into the "Belén capital of the Philippines". The Belen Festival began in September 2007, with the first Belen-making workshop conducted on December 16, 2007. Organizers have intended the festival to become an annual event in the province. Senator Loren Legarda led the awarding of the first Belen-making competition where Tarlac PNP Office Belen, built by at least 24 policemen, won the first prize.

Belenismo in Spanish means the art of making Belén, a representation of the Nativity scene in which the Holy Family (Joseph, Mary and the infant Jesus) is visited by the three wise men who came to the manger through the guidance of a star.

=== Chicharon Iniruban Festival ===
This annual festival is celebrated in the town of Camiling, during the last week of October. It is intended as a preparation for All Saints' Day and a Thanksgiving celebration for the good harvest and meat products, especially the chicharon or bagnet. It also features the exotic and delicious rice cake iniruban, as called by the Ilocanos. The festival's highlights are the street dancing competition, Miss Iniruban beauty pageant, and the municipality's agri-trade. It is the oldest cultural celebration in the province, introduced in 2000.

== Provincial capital ==
The highest seat of political power of the province is located on a hill in Barangay San Vicente, Tarlac City. The present structure was finished in 1909. During the Japanese occupation, the provincial capitol was vacated and used as the provincial headquarters of the Imperial Army. The capitol suffered great damage during the Second World War, but afterwards, in 1946, the United States helped rebuild and improve its structure. Because of its historical background, the picture of the capitol façade appeared in the previous version of the 500 peso bill.

== Government ==
Current Provincial Government Officials (2025-2028)

- Governor: Christian Tell A. Yap (SST)
- Vice-Governor: Estelita M. Aquino (NPC)

Sangguniang Panlalawigan Members

1st District

- Pearl Angeli E. Pacada (NPC)
- Joy Gilbert R. Lamorena (NPC)
- Agutito L. Roxas (NPC)

2nd District

- Harmes S. Sembrano (NPC)
- Dennis Norman T. Go (Independent)
- Christopher C. Delos Reyes (Independent)
- Arron L. Villaflor (PFP)

3rd District

- Henry P. Cruz (NPC)
- Carlito S. David (NPC)
- Antonio L. Villanueva (NPC)

Ex-Officio Members

- TBD (President, Liga ng mga Barangay)
- Emilio "Mico" Y. Macasaet (President, PCL)
- TBD (President, Panlalawigang Pederasyon ng Sangguniang Kabataan)

=== House of Representatives ===
District	Representative	Party	Term	Bloc
1st	Jaime Eduardo Marc D. Cojuangco	NPC	2	Majority
2nd	Maria Cristina "Cristy" C. Angeles	PFP	1	Majority
3rd	Noel "Bong" N. Rivera	NPC	2	Majority

== Notable people ==
=== National heroes and patriots ===
- Servillano Aquino – Filipino revolutionary general
- Benigno Aquino Jr. – former Philippine senator and opposition leader during Martial Law dictatorship of dictator Ferdinand Marcos
- Francisco Makabulos – Filipino revolutionary general, and former governor of Tarlac

=== Politics and government ===
- Bam Aquino – Philippine senator
- Benigno Aquino III – 15th president of the Philippines
- Benigno Aquino Sr. – 6th Speaker of the House of Representatives of the Philippines, and 10th Secretary of the Department of Agriculture and former Philippine senator
- Butz Aquino – former Philippine senator
- Corazon Aquino – 11th president of the Philippines
- Herminio Aquino – former congressman and former Tarlac vice governor
- Tessie Aquino-Oreta – former Philippine senator
- Jesus Barrera – 67th associate justice of the Supreme Court of the Philippines
- Nicanor Bartolome – 16th Chief of the Philippine National Police
- César Bengzon – 9th Chief Justice of the Supreme Court of the Philippines, and first Filipino Justice of the International Court of Justice
- Onofre Corpuz – 23rd Secretary of the Department of Education, 13th President of the University of the Philippines, and National Scientist of the Philippines for Political Economics and Government
- Ricardo David – 41st Chief of Staff of the Armed Forces of the Philippines
- Voltaire Gazmin – 26th Secretary of the Department of National Defense
- Eva Estrada Kalaw – former Philippine senator
- Jesli Lapus – 31st Secretary of the Department of Trade and Industry, and 34th Secretary of the Department of Education
- Rodante Marcoleta – current Philippine senator
- Horacio Morales – 8th Secretary of the Department of Agrarian Reform
- Macario Peralta Jr. – former Philippine senator, and 13th Secretary of the Department of National Defense
- Alberto Romulo – 23rd Secretary of the Department of the Foreign Affairs, 34th Executive Secretary of the Philippines
- Jose Roy – former Philippine senator
- Carlos P. Romulo – 4th president of the United Nations General Assembly, 14th Secretary of the Department of the Foreign Affairs, 11th President of the University of the Philippines, and National Artist of the Philippines for Literature
- Paulino Santos – 2nd Chief of Staff of the Armed Forces of the Philippines
- Gilbert Teodoro – 25th Secretary of the Department of National Defense
- Jose Yap – former congressman and former governor

=== Historical personalities ===
- Bernabe Buscayno – founder of the New People's Army, the military wing of the Communist Party of the Philippines
- Leonor Rivera – José Rizal's second cousin and love interest well known as Maria Clara

=== Arts and sciences ===
- Gregorio C. Brillantes – National Artist of the Philippines for Literature
- Benjamin Cabrera – Filipino physician who was known for his research on medical parasitology and public health
- Xiao Chua – public historian
- Alex Niño – Filipino comics artist best known for his work for the American publishers DC Comics, Marvel Comics, and Warren Publishing, and in Heavy Metal magazine
- Pinggot Zulueta – Filipino visual artist and photojournalist

=== Religion ===
- Alberto Ramento – ninth Supreme Bishop and chairperson of the Supreme Council of Bishops of the Iglesia Filipina Independiente (IFI)

=== Business ===
- Danding Cojuangco – chairman and CEO of San Miguel Corporation, the largest food and beverage corporation in the Philippines and Southeast Asia He was widely considered a crony during the Marcos regime.
- Lucia Cunanan – Filipina restaurateur best known for having invented or at least re-invented sisig, a popular Kapampangan dish in the Philippines and Filipino diasporas worldwide

=== Entertainers ===
- Ion Perez – TV host personality
- Lorna Tolentino – veteran actress
- Arron Villaflor – actor
- Brent Manalo – actor

== See also ==
- Diocese of Tarlac
- Super regions of the Philippines
- Pampanga
- Pangasinan
- Nueva Ecija
