= Pozorrubio =

Municipality in Pangasinan, Philippines

Pozorrubio Ili ti Pozorrubio (Ilocano) Baley na Pozorrubio (Pangasinan)
- Municipality
- Municipality of Pozorrubio
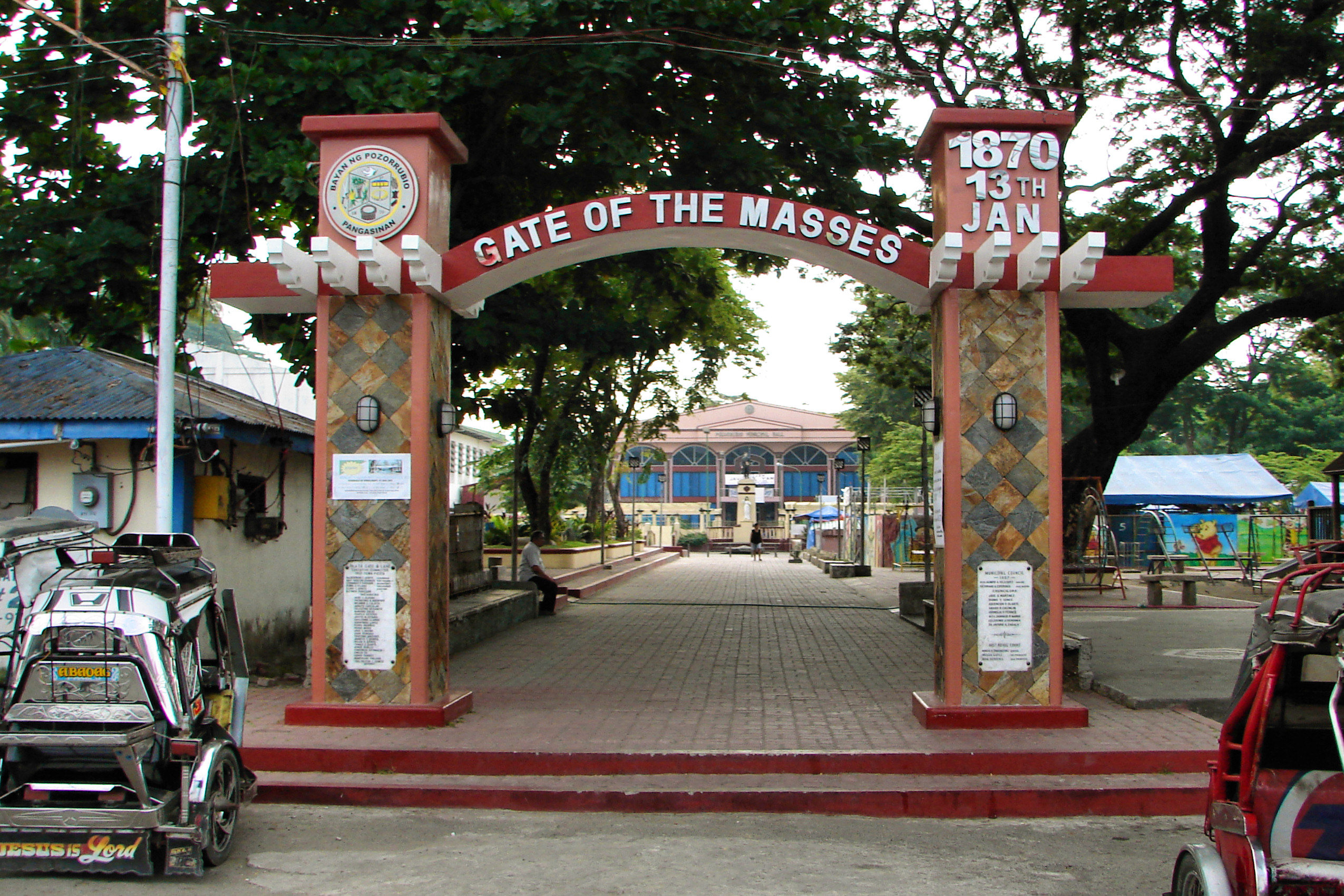
- Plaza with Municipal Hall in background

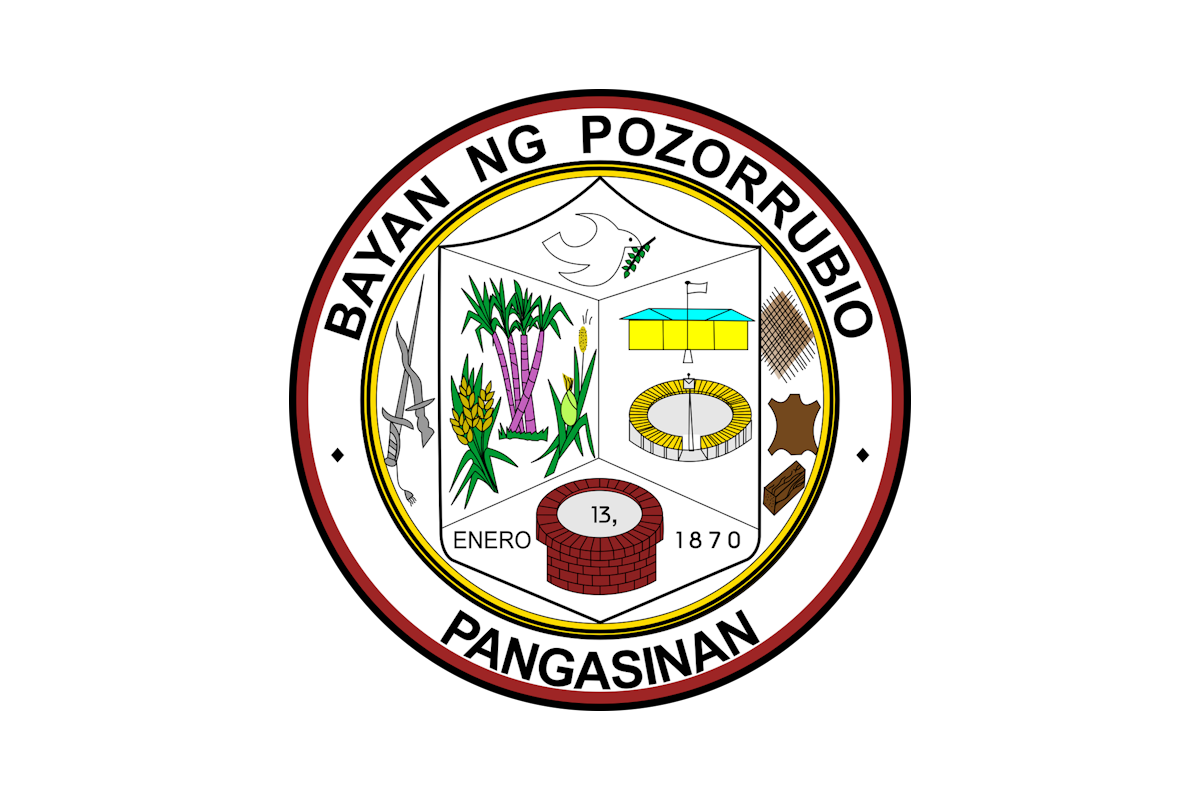
- Flag Seal
- Motto: "Pozorrubio, Strong and Free"
- Anthem: Pozorrubio Hymn
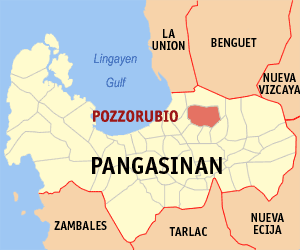
- Map of Pangasinan with Pozorrubio highlighted
- Interactive map of Pozorrubio
- Location within the Philippines
- Coordinates: 16°07′N 120°33′E
- Country: Philippines
- Region: Ilocos Region
- Province: Pangasinan
- District: 5th district
- Founded: January 13, 1870
- Barangays: 34 (see Barangays)

Government
  - Type: Sangguniang Bayan
  - Mayor: Kelvin T. Chan
  - Vice Mayor: Maximiano R. Balelo
  - Representative: Ramon N. Guico, Jr.
  - Municipal Council: Members: Charina Nichole O. Co; Miguel A. Abalos, Jr.; Kelvin Rheigner T. Chan; Dennis C. Uy; Mark Lee P. Francisco; Orlando L. Guillermo; Edwin C. Bautista; Joel N. Villanueva; Dyy Penong
  - Electorate: 50,986 voters (2025)

Area
  - Total: 134.60 km^{2} (51.97 sq mi)
- Elevation: 69 m (226 ft)
- Highest elevation: 588 m (1,929 ft)
- Lowest elevation: 24 m (79 ft)

Population (2024 census)
  - Total: 75,143
  - Density: 558.27/km^{2} (1,445.9/sq mi)
  - Households: 20,294

Economy
  - Income class: 1st municipal income class
  - Poverty incidence: 9.2% (2023)
  - Revenue: ₱ 347.5 million (2024)
  - Assets: ₱ 1,242 million (2024)
  - Expenditure: ₱ 274.7 million (2024)
  - Liabilities: ₱ 105.1 million (2024)

Service provider
  - Electricity: Pangasinan 3 Electric Cooperative (PANELCO 3)
- Time zone: UTC+8 (PST)
- ZIP code: 2435
- PSGC: 0105530000
- IDD : area code: +63 (0)75
- Native languages: Pangasinan; Ilocano; Tagalog
- Website: www.pozorrubio.ph

Pozorrubio, officially the Municipality of Pozorrubio ([pɔsɔˈrʊbjɔʔ]; Pangasinan: Baley na Pozorrubio; Ilocano: Ili ti Pozorrubio; Tagalog: Bayan ng Pozorrubio), is a municipality in the province of Pangasinan, Philippines. According to the 2024 census, it has a population of 75,143 people.

Often, the town's name is written as "Pozzorubio", but the correct spelling is "Pozorrubio". Its land area is 8,965 hectares.

== History ==
Pozorrubio began as Claris, a hamlet and later barrio of San Jacinto, Pangasinan. It was named in honour of Juan de la Cruz Palaris, leader of the 1762 Palaris Revolt in Binalatongan (today San Carlos City).

Wealthy landowners Don Benito Magno, Domingo Aldana, Pedro Itliong, Bartolomé Naniong, Bernardo Olarte, Pedro Salcedo, Juan Ancheta, Antonio Sabolboro, José Songcuan, Tobías Paragas, Francisco Callao, and Baltazar Casiano y Salazar filed a petition on June 19, 1868, with Governor-General Carlos María de la Torre y Navacerrada through the Pangasinan Alcalde Mayor, requesting the conversion of Barrio Claris into an independent town. It included the modern barangays of Nantangalan, Maambal, Bantugan, Dilan, Malasin, and Talogtog. The town's seat of government was at the original site of Barrio Claris, now Barangay Amagbagan.

The local parish priest, Rev. Fr. Asencio OP, and a certain Domingo Castro of Lingayen, also filed petitions to the Governor-General. Magno, Castro, Aldana, and Don Agustín Venezuela travelled to Manila by carruaje (stagecoach pulled by four horses) to personally deliver the second petition, which Queen Isabel II of Spain gave assent to on August 13, 1868.

The request was granted on November 3, 1869, and Claris became a Municipio on January 13, 1870. Fr Asencio suggested the new name of "Pozorrubio" to Governor-General De la Torre: it was in his honour as he was also Count of Pozor, with the addition of "Rubio".

Saint Philomena was chosen as the town's patron saint, with a feast day of August 13, the anniversary of Queen Isabel II elevating the barrio into a town. In the Catholic Church, she is venerated as a young virgin martyr whose remains were discovered in 1802 in the Catacombs of Priscilla. Three tiles enclosing the tomb bore a Latin inscription that was taken to indicate that her name was Filumena, anglicised as "Philomena". Her relics were translated to Mugnano del Cardinale in 1805 and became the focus of widespread devotion, with several miracles credited to her intercession, including the healing of Venerable Pauline Jaricot in 1835. Saint John Vianney attributed to her the miraculous cures people said were his work.

The town's twelve intelligentsia formed the first Communidad or Town Council (Tribunal or Presidencia, the Town Hall):

- Don Benito Magno
- Don Domingo Aldana
- Don Juan Ancheta
- Don Francisco Callao
- Don Pedro Itliong
- Don Bartolomé Naniong
- Don Bernardo Olarte
- Don Tobías Paragas
- Don Antonio Sabaldoro
- Don Pedro Salcedo
- Don José Songcuan
- Don Protacio Venezuela

Magno was elected on November 3, 1868, as the first Gobernadorcillo and began his term on January 1, 1869. Don José Sanchéz and Don Agustín Venezuela donated the plaza lot.

The parish priest of Pozorrubio's mother town San Jacinto, Fr. Pablo Almazan, appointed Doña Francisca Aldana-Magno, the wife of Don Benito, to teach in the only school set up in Claris. The town was then relocated to Cablong. On December 18, 1880, Gobernadorcillo Don Bernardo Olarte inaugurated the new site, with a new parish priest, Rev. Fr. Joaquín Gonzáles presiding over a brand-new church its attached convento.

During the Second World War, Imperial Japanese troops executed Filomeno G. Magno, a lawyer and the direct heir of Don Benito Magno, in 1942. Don Benito Estaris Magno's mother, Doña María Estaris (Akolaw Inkew) was Benito's first teacher, and his wife Doña Francisca was the schoolteacher in Claris.

On April 19, 2012, Archbishop Oscar V. Cruz declared false the alleged apparition of an aswang (a generic term for a ghoul) in Barangay Villegas.

== Geography ==
Pozorrubio is situated 41.21 kilometres (25.61 mi) from the provincial capital Lingayen, and 204.25 kilometres (126.92 mi) from the country's capital city of Manila.

=== Barangays ===
Pozorrubio is politically subdivided into 34 barangays. Each barangay consists of puroks and some have sitios.

- Alipangpang
- Amagbagan
- Balacag
- Banding
- Bantugan
- Batakil
- Bobonan
- Buneg
- Cablong
- Casanfernandoan
- Castaño
- Dilan
- Don Benito
- Haway
- Imbalbalatong
- Inoman
- Laoac
- Maambal
- Malasin
- Malokiat
- Manaol
- Nama
- Nantangalan
- Palacpalac
- Palguyod
- Poblacion District I
- Poblacion District II
- Poblacion District III
- Poblacion District IV
- Rosario
- Sugcong
- Talogtog
- Tulnac
- Villegas

=== Climate ===
Climate data for Pozorrubio, Pangasinan
Month	Jan	Feb	Mar	Apr	May	Jun	Jul	Aug	Sep	Oct	Nov	Dec	Year
Mean daily maximum °C (°F)	31 (88)	31 (88)	32 (90)	34 (93)	35 (95)	34 (93)	32 (90)	32 (90)	32 (90)	32 (90)	32 (90)	31 (88)	32 (90)
Mean daily minimum °C (°F)	22 (72)	22 (72)	22 (72)	24 (75)	24 (75)	24 (75)	24 (75)	24 (75)	24 (75)	23 (73)	23 (73)	22 (72)	23 (74)
Average precipitation mm (inches)	13.6 (0.54)	10.4 (0.41)	18.2 (0.72)	15.7 (0.62)	178.4 (7.02)	227.9 (8.97)	368 (14.5)	306.6 (12.07)	310.6 (12.23)	215.7 (8.49)	70.3 (2.77)	31.1 (1.22)	1,766.5 (69.56)
Average rainy days	3	2	2	4	14	16	23	21	24	15	10	6	140
Source: World Weather Online

== Demographics ==
Population census of Pozorrubio
Year	Pop.	±% p.a.
1903	11,018	—
1918	15,391	+2.25%
1939	18,627	+0.91%
1948	21,675	+1.70%
1960	26,625	+1.73%
1970	33,006	+2.17%
1975	35,618	+1.54%
1980	38,257	+1.44%
1990	48,460	+2.39%
1995	52,378	+1.47%
2000	58,252	+2.30%
2007	63,689	+1.24%
2010	66,111	+1.37%
2015	69,555	+0.97%
2020	74,729	+1.52%
2024	75,143	+0.13%
Source: Philippine Statistics Authority

== Economy ==
Poverty incidence of Pozorrubio (%)

Source: Philippine Statistics Authority

- Main crops: rice, sugarcane, tobacco, mango, vegetables and legumes, coconut, corn and cotton
- Cottage industries: bamboo and rattan products for exports, swords, knives, bolos, and other metal crafts
- Other industries: sand and gravel, concrete hollow blocks, leather craft, gold panning, fresh water fishponds, poultry and cattle raising

== Government ==
=== Local government ===
Pozorrubio is part of the fifth congressional district of the province of Pangasinan. It is governed by a mayor, designated as its local chief executive, and by a municipal council as its legislative body in accordance with the Local Government Code. The mayor, vice mayor, and the councilors are elected directly by the people through an election which is being held every three years.

The chief executives of the town are Mayor Kelvin T. Chan and Vice Mayor Maximiano R. Balelo, with eight Sangguniang Bayan members or councilors who hold office at the Town Hall and Legislative Building's Session Hall.

=== Elected officials ===
Members of the Municipal Council (2025–2028)
Position	Name
Congressman	Ramon "Monching" N. Guico Jr.
Mayor	Kelvin T. Chan
Vice-Mayor	Maximiano R. Balelo
Councilors	Charina Nichole O. Co
Councilors	Miguel A. Abalos, Jr.
Councilors	Kelvin Rheigner T. Chan
Councilors	Dennis C. Uy
Councilors	Mark Lee P. Francisco
Councilors	Orlando "Orly" L. Guillermo
Councilors	Edwin C. Bautista
Councilors	Joel N. Villanueva

== Education ==
There are two schools district offices which govern all educational institutions within the municipality. They oversee the management and operations of all private and public, from primary to secondary schools. These are Pozorrubio I Schools District Office, and Pozorrubio II Schools District Office.

=== Primary and elementary schools ===
- Aldersgate Children's Garden Christian Learning Center
- Alipangpang Elementary School
- Ama-Talo Elementary School
- Balacag Elementary School
- Bantugan Elementary School
- Bobonan Central School
- Buneg Elementary School
- Bright Horizons Childrens Center
- Casanfernandoan Elementary School
- Don Benito Elementary School
- Don Domingo Magno Elementary School
- Eagles' Nest Foundational Learning Center
- Haway Elementary School
- Imbalbalatong Elementary School
- Inoman Elementary School
- Laoac Elementary School
- Maambal Elementary School
- Malasin Elementary School
- Malokiat Elementary School
- Manaol Elementary School
- Mary Help of Christians Learning Center
- Mother Gosse Intl. Playskool and Grade School
- Nama Elementary School
- Nantangalan Elementary School SPED Center
- Palacpalac Elementary School
- Palguyod Elementary School
- Pozorrubio Central School
- Rosario Elementary School
- Shiena Hills Academy
- Sugcong Elementary School
- Tulnac Elementary School
- Villegas Elementary School

=== Secondary schools ===
- Benigno V. Aldana National High School
- Bobonan National High School
- Dilan Integrated School
- Don Benito Agro-Industrial High School
- Eugenio P. Perez National High School
- Nama National High School
- Nantangalan National High School
- Palguyod National High School
- Rosario National High School

== Tourism ==
The town's interesting points and events include:

- Town Fiesta – January 11 (Pozorrubio 142rd Foundation Day & Town Fiesta Schedule of Activities)
- Patopat Festival – Frontage, Executive Building.
- Legislative Building and the municipal library.
- The Plaza pergola (Don Domingo M. Magno, 1930s with authentic marker, the colorful history of Pozorrubio)
- Plaza Park and Children's Park
- Pozorrubio-Iligan City Friendship Park
- Public Market
- Quibuar Springs, Guernica Hill

=== Saint Jude Thaddeus Church ===
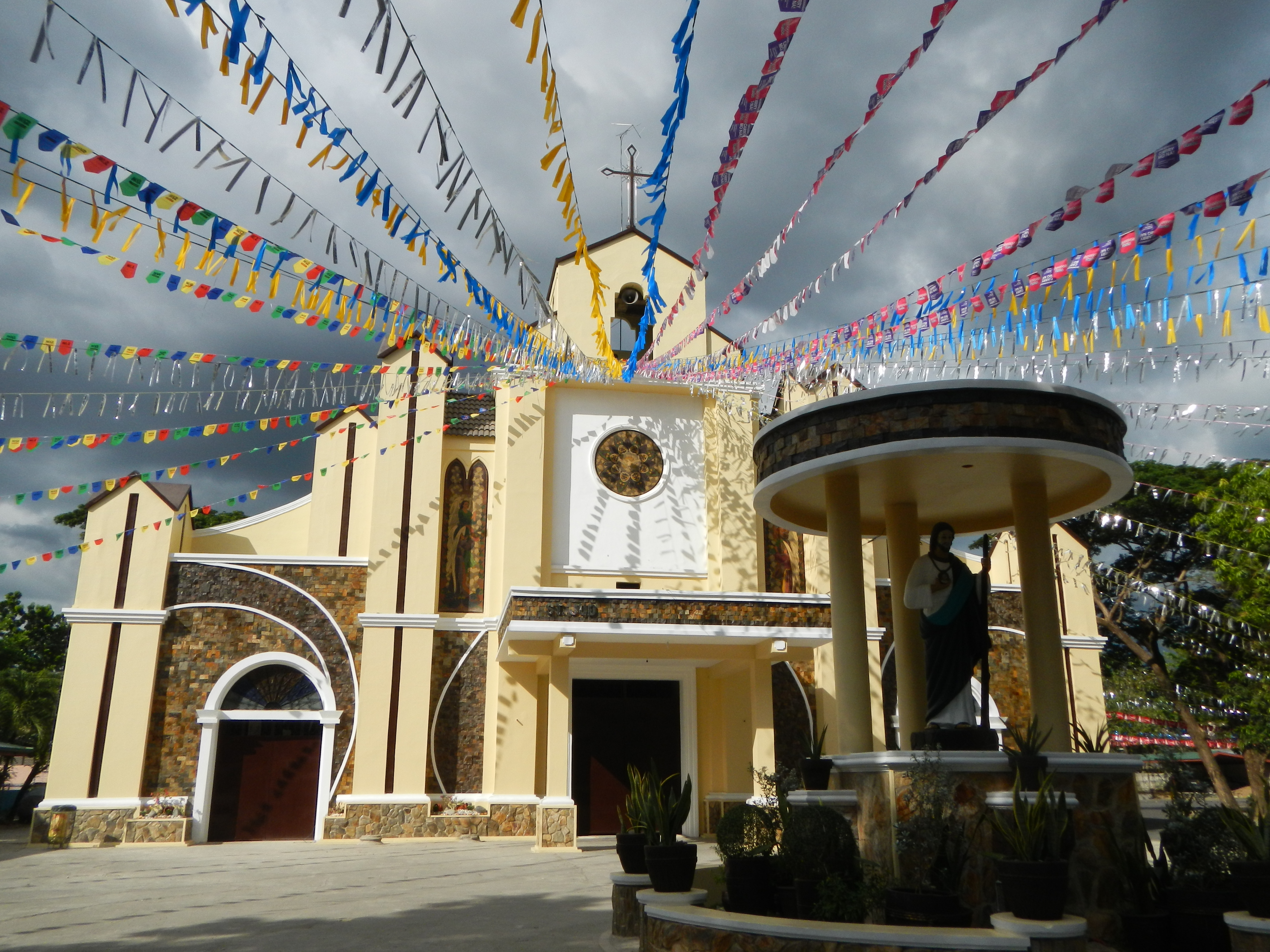
Façade with a shrine to Saint Jude the Apostle.

Saint Jude Thaddeus Parish Church is under the jurisdiction of the Roman Catholic Archdiocese of Lingayen-Dagupan, Roman Catholic Diocese of Urdaneta (Coordinates: 16°6'42"N 120°32'42"E). Its feast day is October 28; the present parish priest is Rev. Fr Jesus Melvyn N. Bufete, while the parochial vicar is Rev. Fr Dann Philip B. Soriano.

The town and parish were founded on March 12, 1834, by Rev. Fr Domingo Naval, the vicar of San Jacinto. The 1839–1842 saw the erection of an ermita amid the creation of Pozorrubio as Municipio on January 30, 1870, per Royal Decree of the Governor-General.

The temporary church in Cablong (now the town proper) was opened and consecrated on July 26, 1879, by Rev. Fr Julián López, vicar of San Jacinto; Rev. Fr Joaquín Gonzáles was the first parish priest until 1884. Rev. Fr Silvestre Fernández (1887–1893) added the convento and the escuelas of caton and the old, brick-walled cemetery. Mortar and ladrillo were used for house construction. Rev. Fr Mariano Rodríguez (1893–1899) built a bigger brick church (75.57 m long, 23 m 50 cm wide, with walls of 4 m high), but it lay unfinished due to the Philippine-American War.

Rev. Fr Lucilo Meris (1899–1925), the first native Filipino parish priest of Pozorrubio, shortened the church to 42 m, while American bombers destroyed the church complex on January 7, 1945, as it retook the Philippines from the Japanese. It was rebuilt by Rev. Fr Emilio Cinense (1947–1952), who founded Saint Philomena's Academy in 1948 and later became Bishop. Rev. Fr Alfredo Cayabyab (1954–1967) rebuilt the church, while Rev. Fr Primo García and Rev. Fr Arturo Aquino helped reconstruct the present church.

== Gallery ==
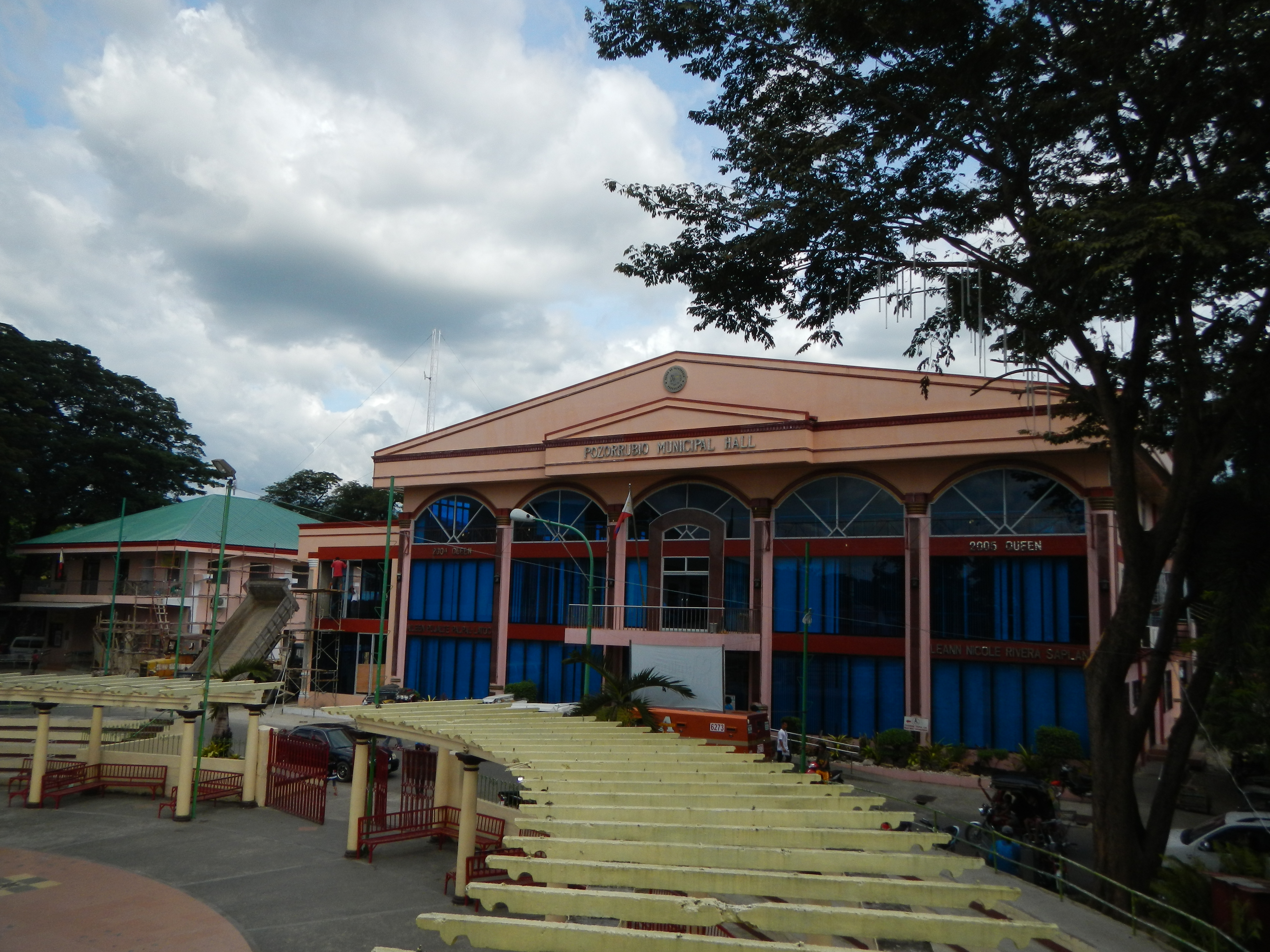
Town Hall along Sison Street

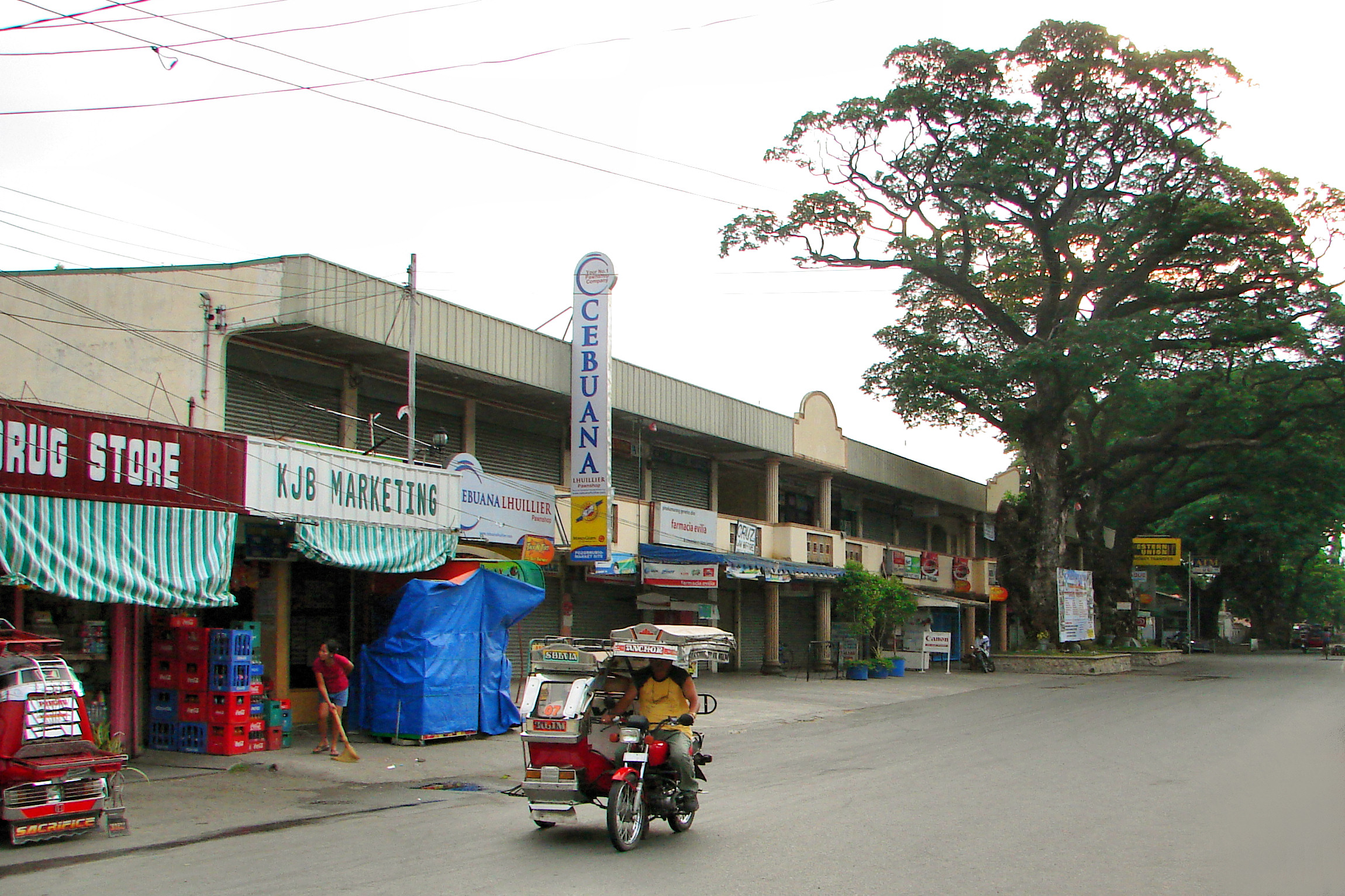
Downtown along Penoy Street

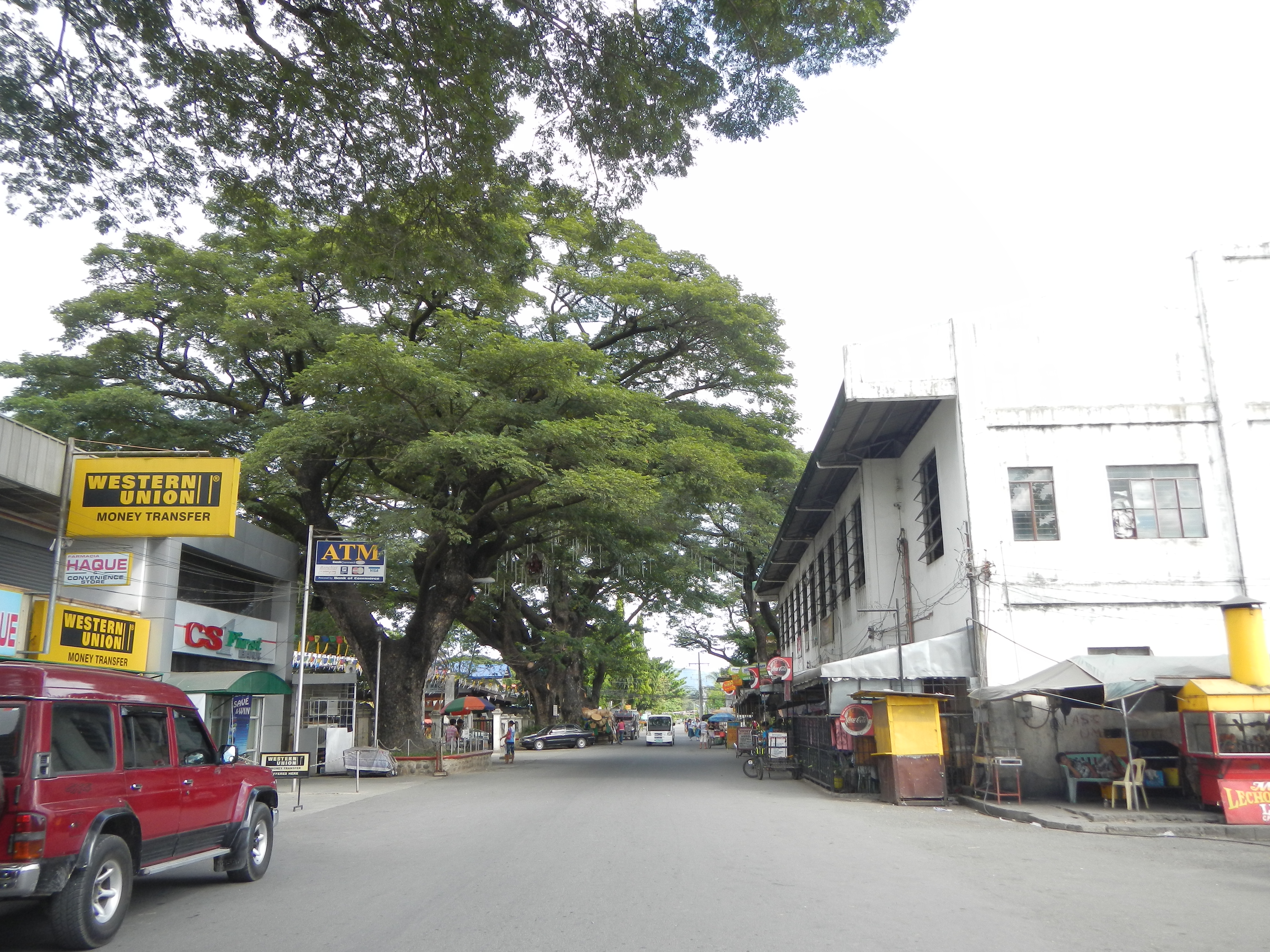
Downtown

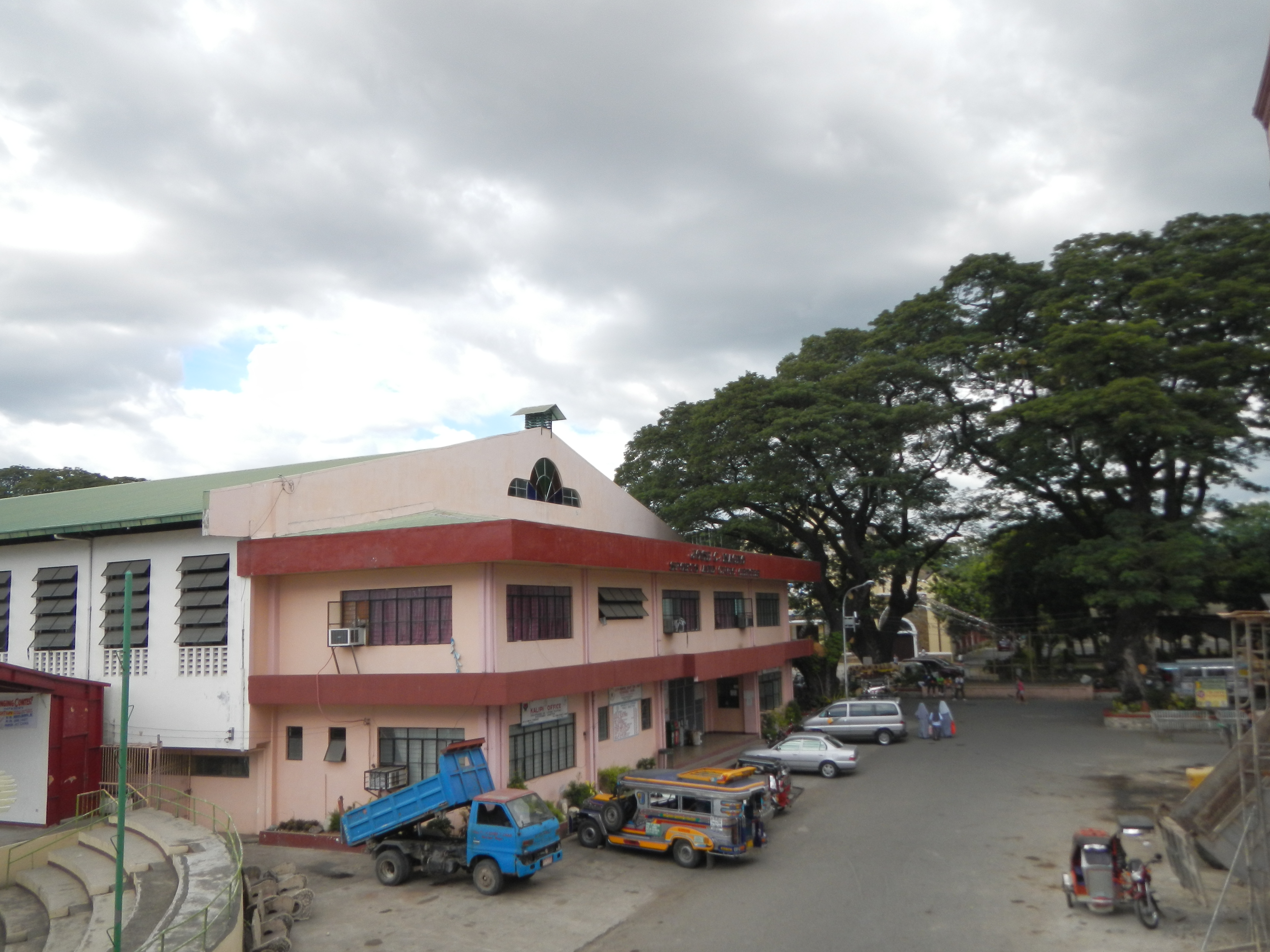
Don José Magno Sports and Civic Center

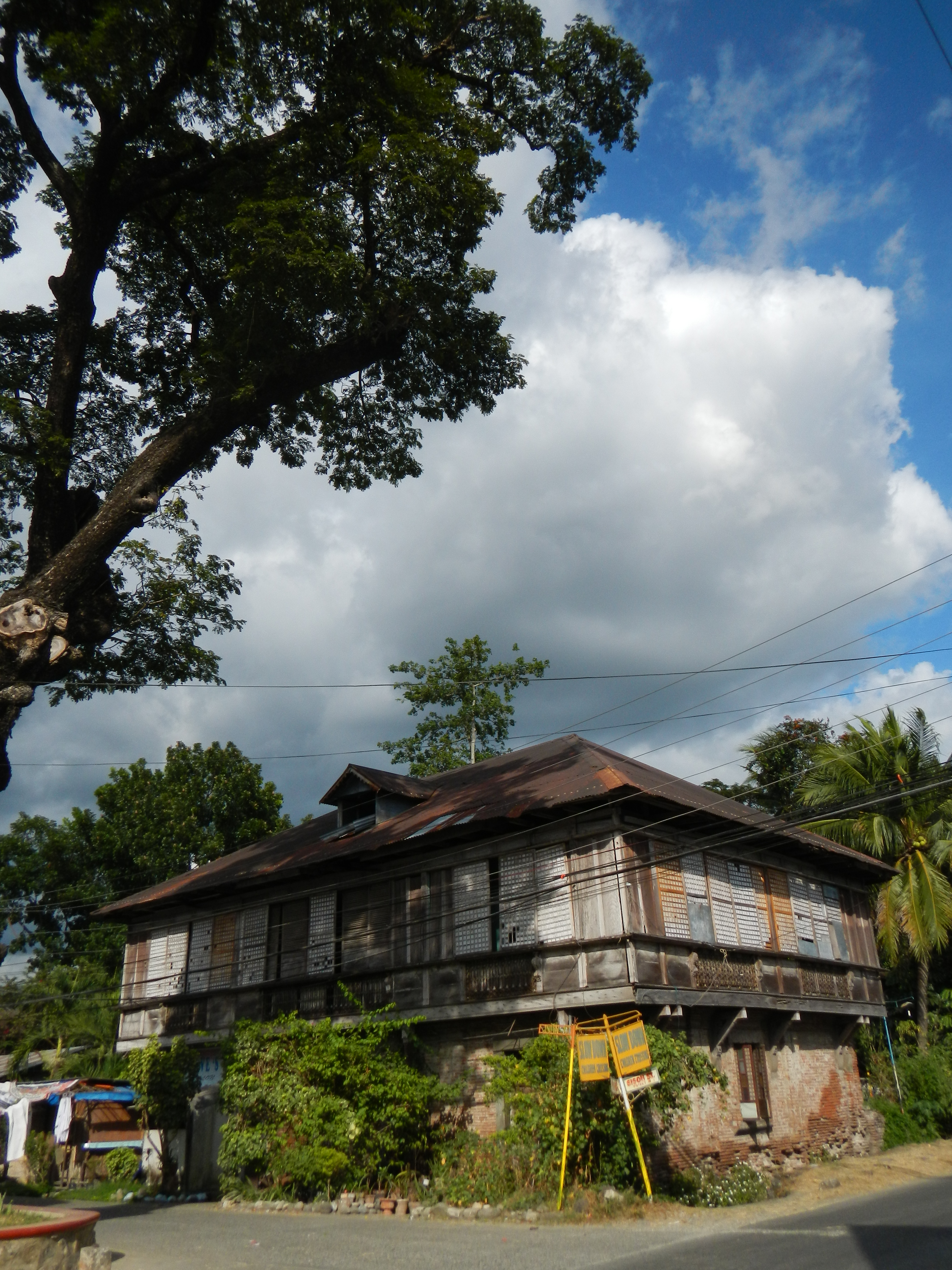
Jovellanos-Venezuela ancestral House

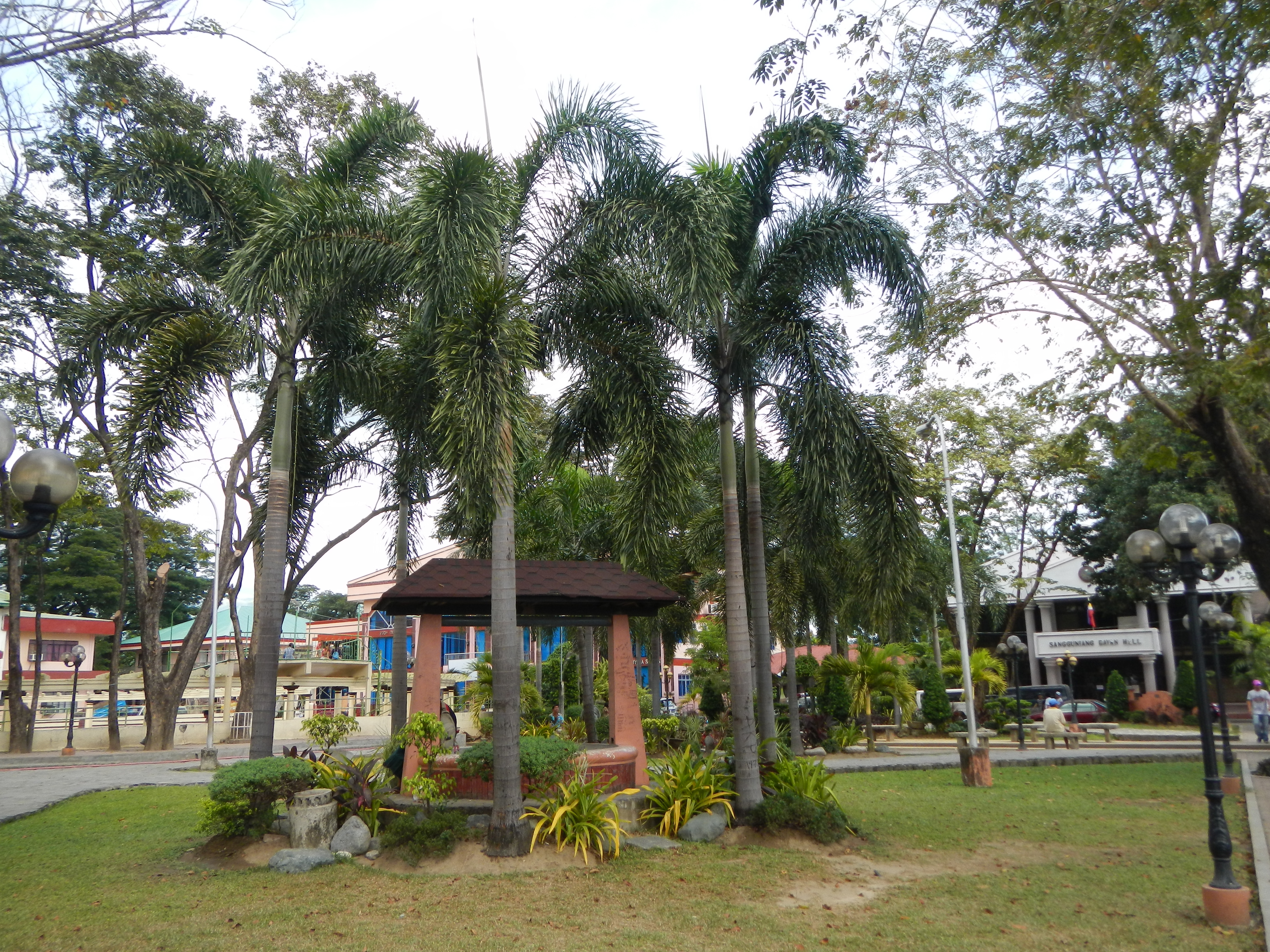
Park and Well in the town plaza
