= Benigno V. Aldana National High School =

Public school in Pangasinan, Philippines

Benigno V. Aldana National High School Mataas na Paaralang Benigno V. Aldana

Location
- MacArthur Highway corner Sison st. Cablong; Pozorrubio, Pangasinan; Philippines
- Coordinates: 16°06′52.6″N 120°32′47.9″E

Information
- Type: State-owned, public institution
- Motto: “Benignians, Proud and Great!”
- Established: July 15, 1946
- Principal: Eddie M. Raguindin Ed.D. (OIC, Office of the Principal IV)
- Grades: 7 to 12
- Song: BVANHS Hymn
- Publication: "The Red Well" (English) "Ang Pulang Balon" (Filipino)
- Affiliations: DepEd Region 1

Benigno V. Aldana National High School (BVANHS), formerly Pozorrubio Junior High School, Pozorrubio High School, and Benigno V. Aldana National Memorial High School, is a public high school located and serving Pozorrubio, Pangasinan, Philippines and nearby towns. It has about 2,500 students each year and 111 teachers in its faculty.

== History ==
BVANHS was established on July 15, 1946, and initially had 235 students. Its first classrooms were located on several sites at the heart of the town. Locations of the first classrooms were at Don Andres Olarte's residence at Sison Street, Don Gerardo Nabor Sr.'s residence at Espiritu Street, the old Itliong-Estaris residence at Rizal Street (now the property of a bank), the Jovellanos-Venezualla ancestral house (the oldest structure standing in Pozorrubio at 131 years as of 2013), Andres Aldana Sr.'s house (now abandoned) at Espiritu Street, and Orestes Olarte's abode at Caballero Street. The very first school principal was Enrique Telesforo, from Lingayen. The first class graduated in 1947 with 37 graduates and their graduation ceremony was held at the Plaza Pergola at the heart of the town.

Right after that, the school was moved to its permanent location in Barangay Cablong, Pozorrubio, Pangasinan with three hectares of land donated by Don and Doña Orestes and Cion Olarte. Later on, 3.7 more hectares of land was purchased using money raised from fund-raising and contributions initiated by the Parents-Teachers Association established by the school.

Class '49 was the first one to have a secondary section that divided the graduation class into two sections of 56 and 26 students.

Enrique was then replaced by Candelario Quinto in 1948 as principal of the school, followed by Mr. Numerio Mac. Vinluan in 1952, and then later succeeded by Brigida Q. Magno in 1967 until Martial Law was declared in 1972. Orlando Perez then served as principal from 1975 to November 2001, followed by Alfredo Calugay, who served as principal for almost three years until he was reassigned to another school in 2004 due to issues regarding his professional career at the school. Agnes Raguinan was then appointed as OIC (Officer-in-Charge) by the Division II, Region I, Office of the Department of Education of the Philippines in 2004–2006. Dr. Roberto B. Quezon served as the principal of the school after being appointed as OIC in 2006 and promoted to the position in 2008. He served as the principal until 2022. Dr. Jerome S. Paras served as the principal of the school on January 9, 2023, after the retirement of Dr. Quezon. He served as the principal until early December of that year. He was appointed as the District Supervisor of Mangaldan District I in 2024. Dr. Redentor B. Aquino, who was the Chief Education Supervisor of Pangasinan II, served as the OIC-Principal of the school for the month of December 2023. Currently, Dr. Eddie M. Raguindin, who serves as the Education Program Supervisor (EPS) of Science, is the Officer-in-Charge (OIC) Principal IV of the school.

== The Campus ==
Many physical changes took place in the school in its early years, such as the cogon-wildgrass rooftops and sawali walls, which were then gradually replaced with newer and more durable materials such as cement and steel. Presently, the school is considered as one of the best in the Philippines with regards to availability of resources and educational facilities. The campus now boasts 17 modern buildings, 10 relaxation areas and study sheds, a library and media center, a computer building, a mini theater, an audio-visual room, and a student's worship center (notably the first in public high schools in the area). There are also several individual department centers, four canteens (including one main cafeteria), two sheltered stage areas, and a basketball, badminton, and volleyball court that have been transformed into new classroom buildings to accommodate the growing population of the campus. It also had a fishpond and agricultural area, a botanical park, and a large open-space quadrangle. The school also boasts a green environment, with almost every area covered and shaded with trees and garbage cans spread everywhere to keep the environment clean.

Furthermore, the campus hosts a local museum of artifacts for the town, and other historical legacies donated to the school.

Most of the improvements of the campus are donated by alumni and parents of students of the school. Further expansion and developments are still performed to accommodate the increasing student population size.
