= Palaris =

18th-century Filipino revolutionary

Pantaleon Perez

Governor of Free Pangasinan
- In office November 3, 1762 – January 16, 1765
- Preceded by: None (Andres Malong as King of Pangasinan)
- Succeeded by: None

Personal details
- Born: Pantaleón Pérez y Ugnay; January 8, 1733 Binalatongan, Pangasinan, Captaincy General of the Philippines, Spanish Empire
- Died: January 16, 1765 (aged 32) Binalatongan, Pangasinan, Captaincy General of the Philippines, Spanish Empire
- Cause of death: Executed by hanging

Pantaleon Perez, more widely known as Juan de la Cruz, or by his nickname Palaris, (8 January 1733 – 16 January 1765) was a Pangasinan leader in the province of Pangasinan in the Philippines who led a revolt against the colonial authorities during the 18th century. The uprising is known as the Palaris Revolt.

== Early years ==
Pantaleon was born to Tomas Perez, a village chief, and Catalina Ugnay, both of the town of Binalatongan (now San Carlos City), Pangasinan. He had a brother, Colet and a sister, Simeona. He also had two eldest brothers who died in early childhood. Being a family of a village chief (or cabeza de barangay, in Spanish), the Perez clan were members of Binalatongan's principalia (ruling class).

Little is known of the personal circumstances of Perez except that he was educated in Binalatongan and was orphaned in his teens. He then moved to Manila and worked as the coachman of the Spanish official Francisco Enríquez de Villacorta, a member of the Audiencia Real, which served as the privy council of the governor-general who governed the Philippines.

Palaris' revolt became known as the second wave of the Pangasinenses resistance against Spain (first wave was initiated by Andres Malong decades earlier). The lore of the Amputi Layag that came to be known across Pangasinan was revived by Palaris (Malong started the first revolt that culminated in the first Amputi Layag resistance).

== Homecoming and revolt ==
Flag of the "Free Ilocos" and other Philippines ethnic groups during the Seven Years' War.

After the British Invasion of the Philippines during the Seven Years' War, the Spanish colonial government, including Villacorta, had relocated to Bacolor in the province of Pampanga, which was then adjacent to Pangasinan.

It was at this time that the principalia of Binalatongan protested the abuses committed by the provincial governor. The town leaders demanded that the governor be removed and that the colonial government stop collecting taxes since the islands were already under the British.

But Governor-General Simon de Anda dismissed the demands and the revolt broke out in November 1762. The name of de la Cruz, who began to be known as Palaris, emerged as one of the leaders of the revolt, along with his brother Colet, Andrés López, and Juan de Vera Oncantin.

== Free Pangasinan ==
By December, all Spanish officials, except the Dominican friars who were in charge of the Catholic mission, had left Pangasinan. The Spanish colonial government had to deal with the British invaders and the simultaneous Silang Revolt, led by Diego Silang, in the neighboring province of Ilocos in the north. (The present-day province of La Union was still part of Pangasinan and Ilocos.)

At the battle of Agno, he faced on March 1, 1763, the Spanish forces under the command of Alfonso de Arayat, who led a composite troop of Spanish soldiers and Indios loyal to Spain. Arayat withdrew after losing much of his Indio loyalists.

Pangasinenses took over all official functions and controlled the province up to the Agno River, the natural boundary between Pangasinan and neighboring Pampanga in the south. (The present-day province of Tarlac was still part of Pampanga.)

At the height of the uprising, Palaris commanded 10,000 men. He was also in communication with Silang, with whom he was coordinating a bigger offensive against the Spanish.

== Defeats ==
However, the Seven Years' War ended on February 10, 1763, with the signing of the Treaty of Paris (1763) in Paris, France. Also, Silang was assassinated on May 28, 1763, by an Indio under the employ of the friars. The Spanish were then able to focus on the uprising and mustered forces to surround Palaris.

The Spanish friars, who were allowed to stay in the province, also started a campaign to persuade Pangasinan residents of the futility of the Palaris Revolt.

By September 1763, news of the peace treaty reached Pangasinan and army of Palaris' men surrendered and returned to normal life amid the Spanish offensive.

Palaris tried to fend off the offensive at the village of Mabalitec near the Agno River between Binalatongan and Bayambang in December 1763. To prevent the Spanish from seeking lodging in his hometown, he ordered his men to raze Binalatongan.

But the Spanish won the Battle of Mabalitec, demoralizing Palaris' forces. The town of Binalatongan was rebuilt in another site between December 1763 to June 1764 and renamed San Carlos (now San Carlos City, Pangasinan), in honor of the reigning King Carlos III of Spain.

Palaris' forces made a last stand at the town of San Jacinto, Pangasinan, but they were defeated. Palaris' advisers, Andrés López and Juan de Vera Oncantin, were captured. They would later be hanged.

== Downfall ==
By March 1764, most of the province had already fallen, leaving Palaris no escape route except through Lingayen Gulf and the South China Sea in the west. He chose to stay in Pangasinan and hid among his supporters.

But his presence terrified his protectors and his own sister Simeona, who was apparently threatened by the Spanish clergy, betrayed him to Agustín Matias, the gobernadorcillo (mayor) of the razed Binalatongan.

Palaris was arrested on Jan. 16, 1765 and brought to the provincial capital of Lingayen for trial. While in detention, he confessed being the principal leader of the revolt. He was convicted and hanged on Feb. 26, 1765. He was 32 years old.
