= Palaris revolt =

Filipino revolt during the Seven Years' War

- Part of the Philippine revolts against Spain and Seven Years' War
Date	November 3, 1762 – March 1765
Location	Pangasinan, Captaincy General of the Philippines
Result	Spanish victory: Execution of Palaris

Belligerents
Spain	Pangasinense rebels

Commanders and leaders
Simon de Anda; Francisco Arayat; Manuel Arza †; Pedro Bonardel	Palaris (executed); Domingo Perez †; Antonio (executed); Victor Valdez †

Strength
Unknown	10,000 at its height

Casualties and losses
210 killed	About 26,900 (including civilians)

The Palaris Revolt of 1762–1765 was led by Juan de la Cruz Palaris, also known as "Pantaleón Pérez", of Binalatongan (now San Carlos City), Pangasinan.

== Prelude ==
Prior to the Palaris' revolt, an earlier revolt in 1660 started under the leadership of Andres Malong, who declared himself King of Pangasinan. The revolt would end with Malong's surrender by late January 1661.

Pantaleon Perez, otherwise nicknamed "Palaris" and "Juan de la Cruz" was then a coachman of Francisco Enríques de Villacorta, an Auditor of the Real Audiencia when news broke out that the British had taken possession of the Philippines after a battle on October 6, 1762. Due to his stay at the capital, he dressed, spoke and acts like a Manileño so that when he returned to Binalatongan, he was quickly acclaimed as well-known and knowledgeable.

His dealings with his townsfolk earned for him their confidence and respect and, along with his dynamic personality, enabled him to become their leader.

== Rebel takeover of Pangasinan ==
At the incitement of the British, Palaris decided to start his revolt. With him were other leaders such as his brother Domingo, Juan de la Vera and two Hidalgo brothers.

The revolt started on November 3, 1762, after the alcalde mayor of Pangasinan sent a royal commission to collect tribute from the natives. Simon de Anda was at Bacolor, Pampanga at the time when he heard of the revolt in Pangasinan. He warned to the inhabitants of the province to retain loyalty to Spain, serve without pay and pay taxes. However, he couldn't take action against this since he was still hiding from the British who recently sent a force to capture him and his wartime government.

The Spanish did nothing to quell Palaris's revolt, and by December all Spaniards except the Dominican friars left the province due to fear and terror. In their place were Pangasinense officials who took charge of the province.

Anda persuaded the friars there to oppose against Palaris, but they didn't do anything since they lack armies. In Lingayen, the vicar there, Andres Melendez agreed to the rebels' demands, even publishing a document that agreed with this, possibly to save his life from the rebels.

== Brief return of Spanish rule ==
After the Treaty of Paris was signed between Spain, France and Britain concluding the Seven Years' War between them, Anda quickly took action to quell the Pangasinense revolt, initially after Diego Silang's assassination on May.

On November 18, 1763, the Spanish returned to reclaim Pangasinan from the rebels, successfully persuading Palaris to return under Spanish rule. Pangasinenses who escaped to Pampanga were ordered to return, while the document of Melendez about the rebels' demands were burned to prove loyalty to Spain.

At first the Pangasinenses accepted the return of Spanish rule, as long as they were allowed to keep their liberties obtained during the time it was independent. However, the Spanish had empty coffers, so they immediately raised taxes among the populace. This caused them to be wary of the Spanish, especially after they grabbed leftover guns of the Spanish in Lingayen.

== Battles ==
Battle of the Bayambang River
- Part of the Palaris Revolt
Date	between late November and early December 1763
Location	near Bayambang, Pangasinan
Result	Pangasinan victory

Belligerents
Pangasinense rebels	Spain

Commanders and leaders
Pantaleon Perez; Domingo Perez †; Antonio	Francisco Arayat; Pedro Tagle; Pedro Hernani †

Strength
Unknown, around 900-1,000	433, 33 Spaniards and 400 Kapampangan warriors

Casualties and losses
134 killed	389 killed

=== Battle of the Bayambang River ===
After preparations of the revolt were brewing around late November, the Spanish had arrived at the province from Pampanga, after suffering ambushes set up by the rebels around late December. They signaled their arrival by the sound of gunfire. Rejecting another peace offer from Anda, Palaris declared the start of a revolution.

The Spanish were spotted by Antonio, one of Palaris's generals on a tree, which he was quick to alarm their troops through the sound of his bugle. Palaris dispersed his troops throughout the river banks to face the Spanish. The force of 33 Spaniards and 400 Kapampangans under Francisco Arayat arrived later. They successfully encouraged some of Palaris's soldiers to defect, and Palaris greeted them in calm. The Spanish warned Palaris of the consequences, of which he replied in return:

If each of you had guns, we have cannons!

Flag of the Pangasinense rebels at the Bayambang river, early December 1762

Afterwards, the sound of artillery fire began when the Spanish fired at Palaris's force, followed by a cavalry charge led by Pedro Hernani on crossing the river towards the other side. Hernani was then killed by Domingo's spear, but not without shooting Domingo with a pistol.

Meanwhile Pedro Tagle took his position and shouted at the soldiers on the command of attack to maintain morale. Suddenly a hand-to-hand combat took place throughout the other bank. One soldier was hit with a poisoned spear, which took some time for him to paralyze and scream before dying.

It was due to inexperience and the doubting of the rebels that caused the Spanish to claim victory, even taking the rebels' flag. However Arayat ordered a retreat since crossing the river was too difficult and also because the rebels were much more numerous, carrying their flag as a symbol of their valor. Before the final retreat of the rebels, Palaris took the time to cross the river and stab at least few soldiers.

Battle of Barrio Pias
- Part of the Palaris Revolt
Date	around early March 1764
Location	Barrio Pias, Santa Barbara, Pangasinan
Result	Draw

Belligerents
Spain	Pangasinense rebels

Commanders and leaders
Manuel Arza; Pedro Bonardel	Pantaleon Perez Antonio (executed); Victor Valdez

Strength
Unknown (180 in Arza's force)	Unknown

Casualties and losses
Unknown, but heavy	Unknown, but heavy

=== Battle of Barrio Pias ===
After the battle, Palaris and his surviving men regrouped in a barrio named Pias, in Santa Barbara, just north of Bayambang. There they took the time to recover losses, repaired their trenches and fortifications and gathered ammunition and weapons for two months before March 1763. Meanwhile, Jose Acevedo, the new alcalde mayor who took office on December 5, 1763 requested help from Anda's camp, which was still stationed in Bacolor.

Anda dispatched one hundred and eighty men from his camp to Pangasinan, and gave orders to Manuel Arza to extirpate the last remains of the rebellion from Ilocos, that he might form a junction with the troops going to Manila under command of Pedro Bonardel.

The two forces met again at Barrio Pias, around March, 1764. Aside from the main force at Pias, a group of cavalrymen under Victor Valdez was stationed near Mangaldan to check the invading Spaniards from San Fabian. However, this largely failed as Valdez and his group got heavily drunk until midnight. They were awakened by the sound of cannon fire from the Spanish who recently arrived. Although too late, Valdez nevertheless immediately lead his forces to assist Palaris.

When Valdez reached the battlefield, it is certain that it was a struggle between the two sides, as each received numerous casualties on the fighting. Destroyed equipment, abandoned weapons and numerous dead bodies were scattered across the fields. Antonio, Palaris's general was captured, then taken to the Spanish camp chained and tortured. All of the bodies and destroyed equipment were thrown off a cliff.

Palaris, after hearing of Antonio's capture, tried to save him but the Spanish already beheaded him after Antonio had finally told the man who was behind the revolt in exchange for personal freedom. Immediately, the Spanish spread Palaris's name throughout the province, marking the first time they heard of the man who lead their revolution. Nevertheless, the Pangasinenses refused to assist them.

Battle of Dagupan
- Part of the Palaris Revolt
Date	between mid or late March 1764
Location	Dagupan, Pangasinan
Result	Spanish victory

Belligerents
Spain	Pangasinense rebels

Commanders and leaders
Manuel Arza; Pedro Bonardel	Pantaleon Perez; Victor Valdez

Strength
Unknown	Unknown

Casualties and losses
Unknown, but light	Unknown, but heavy

=== Battle of Dagupan ===
After Barrio Pias, the Spanish raided the municipality of Dagupan to end the rebellion completely. Still in Pias, Palaris sent the entirety of his surviving force in an attempt to thwart off the Spanish. After a brief siege of the municipal hall in Calasiao, they continued towards Dagupan, where a fierce battle began.

Lasting for a week, the battle certainly dealt a massive blow to Palaris as his forces received large casualties from the otherwise more-equipped and better-trained Spaniards.

After nearly a week, the rebels retreated to other side of the Calasiao River, then afterwards destroyed the bridge to prevent the Spanish from crossing over.

Battle of the Calasiao River
- Part of the Palaris Revolt
Date	between late March and early April 1764
Location	near Calasiao, Pangasinan
Result	Spanish victory

Belligerents
Spain	Pangasinense rebels

Commanders and leaders
Manuel Arza †	Pantaleon Perez; Victor Valdez †

Strength
Unknown	Unknown

Casualties and losses
Unknown, but light	Unknown, but heavy

=== Battle of the Calasiao River ===
The Spanish decided to pause their advance towards Palaris for a while. Then afterwards, Arza lead a charge by crossing the river. They were met with gunfire from the rebels but nevertheless managed to cross to the other side.

What followed was a hand-to-hand combat between the Spanish and the rebels, the latter being slowly overwhelmed.

Both Arza and Valdez had face-to-face combat until they both slipped towards the river. Everyone paused for a while and waited to see who would rose first. Valdez initially rose carrying the now dead Arza, which had its neck broke. Valdez himself was later killed by a gunfire, his body never to be seen again.

Battle of Binalatongan
- Part of the Palaris Revolt
Date	around the first week of January 1765
Location	Binalatongan and some skirmishes in Calasiao
Result	Spanish victory

Belligerents
Spain	Pangasinense rebels

Commanders and leaders
Pedro Bonardel	Pantaleon Perez; Carlos Hidalgo †; Satur Hidalgo †

Strength
Unknown	Unknown

Casualties and losses
Unknown, but light	Around 1,000, including civilians

=== Battle of Binalatongan ===
By this time, rebel activity was only confined to the mountains, with the Spanish firmly reestablished their authority in the province.

After nearly 10 months, Palaris set out to start the revolt for a third time. They killed many, though that was not enough as they were quickly overwhelmed by the Spanish, forcing them turn east towards Binalatongan.

In an effort to eradicate any possible rebel that might be blending with the general populace, the Spanish shot every person they come across at Barrio Ymbo, including civilians who had nothing to do without the revolt. Numerous others hid in the woods in an attempt to escape infighting.

Palaris, now tired, exhausted and left alone after the Hidalgo brothers, the last leaders aside him killed, escaped the Spanish and his at Barrio de Dios (Porac now). Afterwards he went to Barrio Magtaking, and finally at Barrio Pao.

== Death of Palaris ==
Palaris was always rude to his sister, Simeona, always bore the brunt of the brother's fury in times when he bursts his anger out.

Due to a recent beating since she was a bit late bringing his brother's necessities, Simeona decided to end this suffering by revealing Palaris's whereabouts to Bonardel.

On January 16, 1765, as usual, Simeona brings his brother's lunch at their dining room. Without hesitation, Palaris ate: this allowed his sister to take time to destroy his bow and arrow, then gave the Spanish a signal to attack.

Bonardel led his troops on the hut, and Palaris was immediately murdered on the spot.

== Aftermath ==
Palaris's body was dragged towards Binalatongan and paraded across the town, accompanied by band music. To instill fear towards the people the corpse was chopped, afterwards different body parts were hung across several barrios.

The remaining rebels finally surrendered after nearly a long period of revolt against the Spanish between January and March. Civilians who fled to the mountains also returned after the infighting.

Numerous people experienced hardships thoroughout the entirety of the revolt. People that fled had to resort to eating banana leaves in order to survive. There are also a large number of deaths involving babies and children. It was said that Barrio Catopactopacan had the highest number of child-related deaths.

The population of Pangasinan also saw a dramatic decrease, it has been estimated that 26,927 people were killed between 1762 and 1765, composing nearly half of the pre-war population.

Pangasinan would remain under Spanish rule until the advent of the Philippine Revolution in the province by 1898.
