= List of barangays in Tarlac =

The province of Tarlac has 511 barangays comprising its 17 towns and 1 city.

== Barangays ==
Most populous in its respective city/town (as of 2010)

Barangay	Population					City or Town
Barangay	2010	2007	2000	1995	1990	City or Town
Abagon	4,032	3,943	3,235	2,837	2,638	Gerona
Ablang-Sapang	3,327	3,487	2,790	2,370	2,594	Moncada
Abogado	4,588	4,497	3,745	3,343	2,550	Paniqui
Acocolao	1,675	1,643	1,428	1,158	1,049	Paniqui
Aduas	1,400	1,368	1,213	1,153	1,074	Paniqui
Aguso	6,110	6,211	5,396	4,760	4,185	Tarlac City
Alfonso	7,780	8,376	5,720	4,839	4,740	Concepcion
Alvindia Segundo	1,393	1,348	1,211	1,159	936	Tarlac City
Amacalan	2,830	2,999	2,377	2,023	1,857	Gerona
Ambalingit	636	583	464	431	424	Mayantoc
Amucao	1,991	2,279	2,187	1,899	1,651	Tarlac City
Anoling 1st	748	707	666	545	493	Camiling
Anoling 2nd	801	780	709	653	671	Camiling
Anoling 3rd	1,210	1,159	1,102	1,054	989	Camiling
Anupul	17,356	16,190	11,469	6,918	5,035	Bamban
Apsayan	2,040	1,886	1,738	1,565	1,353	Gerona
Apulid	3,027	2,607	2,605	2,263	2,086	Paniqui
Aranguren	6,700	7,394	25,507	4,971	4,385	Capas
Aringin	1,549	1,656	1,382	1,338	1,212	Moncada
Armenia	4,280	3,872	3,061	3,094	2,709	Tarlac City
Asturias	1,359	1,476	1,327	1,123	980	Tarlac City
Atencio	638	481	477	484	582	Moncada
Atioc	1,644	1,647	1,492	1,292	1,087	Tarlac City
Ayson	1,446	1,401	1,315	1,335	1,250	Gerona
Bacabac	2,292	2,137	1,933	1,857	1,775	Camiling
Bacsay	757	666	661	618	611	Camiling
Baculong	3,935	3,484	3,226	2,733	2,616	Victoria
Baguindoc (Baguinloc)	336	295	327	331	219	Anao
Balanoy	2,187	2,243	1,822	1,500	1,508	La Paz
Balanti	1,725	1,789	1,481	1,274	1,157	Tarlac City
Balaoang	3,368	3,291	3,287	2,843	2,662	Paniqui
Balayang	3,094	2,973	2,580	2,613	2,247	Victoria
Balbaloto	1,871	1,915	1,717	1,604	1,302	Victoria
Baldios	1,881	1,941	1,534	1,343	1,142	Santa Ignacia
Balete	4,819	4,093	3,848	3,362	2,612	Tarlac City
Balibago I	2,008	2,106	1,530	1,490	1,266	Tarlac City
Balibago II	3,375	3,302	2,933	2,578	2,333	Tarlac City
Balingcanaway	5,821	5,892	5,181	4,567	4,131	Tarlac City
Balite	1,642	1,725	1,576	1,427	1,349	Pura
Balloc	1,587	1,601	1,172	1,059	907	San Clemente
Balutu	3,745	3,787	3,123	2,798	2,943	Concepcion
Bamban	1,149	1,139	967	865	666	San Clemente
Banaba	536	402	196	40	5,695	Bamban
Banaba	934	849	651	531	478	Tarlac City
Banaoang East	1,304	1,092	974	981	888	Moncada
Banaoang West	1,521	1,308	1,263	1,277	1,155	Moncada
Bancay 1st	842	856	777	728	725	Camiling
Bancay 2nd	1,231	1,115	870	916	887	Camiling
Bangar	1,975	1,932	1,650	1,477	1,229	Victoria
Bangcu	194	270	134	–	216	Bamban
Bantog	1,926	1,989	1,696	1,478	1,186	Tarlac City
Bantog	2,003	1,817	1,810	1,753	1,519	Victoria
Bantog	604	560	563	516	473	Anao
Bantog-Caricutan	2,750	2,710	2,265	1,852	1,712	La Paz
Baquero Norte	1,427	1,371	1,365	1,210	1,022	Moncada
Baquero Sur	1,265	1,155	939	910	742	Moncada
Barang (Borang)	1,222	1,139	1,158	1,109	971	Paniqui
Baras-Baras	3,317	3,186	2,533	1,613	1,178	Tarlac City
Batang-Batang	1,477	1,587	1,443	1,254	1,178	Tarlac City
Batangbatang	1,200	1,161	1,127	999	912	Victoria
Bawa	1,897	1,613	1,640	1,364	1,328	Gerona
Baybayaoas	419	331	354	334	286	Mayantoc
Bigbiga	1,350	1,225	1,131	1,087	1,016	Mayantoc
Bilad	2,774	2,839	2,452	2,027	2,041	Camiling
Binauganan	4,159	3,689	2,254	2,106	1,882	Tarlac City
Binbinaca	563	557	521	438	383	Mayantoc
Birbira	1,127	1,250	1,016	879	797	Camiling
Bobon 1st	2,370	2,286	1,971	1,773	1,657	Camiling
Bobon 2nd	1,328	1,411	1,157	1,016	960	Camiling
Bobon Caarosipan	675	624	535	517	472	Camiling
Bora	1,471	1,300	1,062	940	682	Tarlac City
Botbotones	1,501	1,475	1,343	1,247	1,191	Santa Ignacia
Brillante	562	546	517	510	508	Paniqui
Buenavista	1,224	891	932	783	512	Tarlac City
Buenavista	2,850	2,796	2,613	2,465	2,170	Pura
Buenlag	2,350	2,625	2,246	1,947	1,774	Gerona
Bueno	1,379	1,255	1,043	851	1,034	Capas
Buhilit (Bubulit)	1,511	1,117	763	599	529	Tarlac City
Bularit	2,472	2,819	2,217	1,831	1,901	Gerona
Bulo	2,375	2,021	1,874	1,467	1,273	Victoria
Burgos	1,803	1,840	1,892	1,595	1,438	Paniqui
Burgos	2,455	2,430	2,226	2,189	2,023	Moncada
Burgos	3,072	2,998	2,275	1,844	1,005	San Jose
Burot	5,185	3,799	3,236	1,877	2,091	Tarlac City
Caanamongan	1,599	1,691	1,423	1,287	1,149	Santa Ignacia
Cabanabaan	843	815	773	699	622	Camiling
Cabaruan	1,121	1,023	1,096	894	881	Santa Ignacia
Cabayaoasan	2,796	2,587	2,469	2,127	1,921	Paniqui
Cabugbugan	1,253	1,192	1,187	1,146	976	Santa Ignacia
Cabuluan	1,232	1,237	1,061	932	974	Victoria
Cacamilingan Norte	2,540	2,230	2,314	2,213	2,137	Camiling
Cacamilingan Sur	2,131	1,977	1,896	1,956	1,976	Camiling
Cadanglaan	685	654	613	536	508	Pura
Caduldulaoan	679	699	514	501	414	Santa Ignacia
Cafe	2,681	2,347	2,064	2,030	2,277	Concepcion
Calabtangan	574	436	299	316	254	Mayantoc
Calamay	692	651	610	531	500	Moncada
Calapan	1,108	948	802	739	677	Moncada
Calayaan	2,806	2,390	2,017	1,829	1,706	Gerona
Calibungan	2,356	2,079	1,900	1,926	1,746	Victoria
Calingcuan	3,168	3,142	2,831	2,385	2,124	Tarlac City
Calipayan	1,470	1,622	1,374	1,189	1,099	Santa Ignacia
Calius Gueco	1,111	1,060	981	851	904	Concepcion
Caluluan	4,726	4,227	3,637	3,221	3,206	Concepcion
Camangaan East	1,665	2,055	1,539	1,231	1,155	Moncada
Camangaan West	1,166	1,189	1,133	1,010	861	Moncada
Campos	358	313	334	331	264	Anao
Camposanto 1 - Norte	1,540	1,343	1,280	1,209	1,135	Moncada
Camposanto 1 - Sur	1,658	1,522	1,607	1,360	1,362	Moncada
Camposanto 2	1,998	2,244	1,875	1,591	1,384	Moncada
Canan	2,678	2,429	2,337	2,000	1,848	Paniqui
Canarem	1,987	1,990	1,687	1,668	1,509	Victoria
Caniag	720	535	625	564	484	Camiling
Caocaoayan	643	636	572	479	463	Mayantoc
Capaoayan	2,638	2,487	2,258	1,999	1,827	Moncada
Capehan	1,736	1,914	1,845	1,408	1,405	Tarlac City
Carabaoan	820	719	671	651	575	Mayantoc
Carael	788	803	751	603	531	Camiling
Caramutan	4,150	3,799	3,485	3,067	2,692	La Paz
Carangian	8,875	8,587	5,857	5,088	4,177	Tarlac City
Carbonel	961	820	810	693	714	Gerona
Cardona	2,515	2,607	2,289	1,965	1,845	Gerona
Care	4,202	3,214	3,088	2,127	–	Tarlac City
Carino	4,554	4,351	4,378	3,943	3,848	Paniqui
Carmen	682	636	602	544	431	Anao
Casili	935	873	853	765	640	Anao
Casipo	265	239	225	200	154	San Clemente
Castillo	3,159	3,398	2,804	2,438	2,155	Concepcion
Catagudingan	695	756	638	616	583	San Clemente
Caturay	1,279	1,105	987	847	847	Gerona
Caut	2,356	2,198	2,035	1,801	1,615	La Paz
Cayanga	1,664	1,736	1,363	1,142	1,161	Paniqui
Cayaoan	2,087	2,301	1,799	1,471	1,391	Camiling
Cayasan	240	228	222	186	226	Camiling
Central	3,507	3,358	3,269	5,413	5,216	Tarlac City
Colibangbang	1,632	1,850	1,548	1,406	1,367	Paniqui
Colubot	1,019	887	721	774	657	San Manuel
Comillas	4,677	4,200	4,244	3,861	3,469	La Paz
Coral	2,047	2,045	1,733	1,385	1,221	Paniqui
Coral-Iloco	3,647	3,343	3,087	2,611	2,272	Ramos
Corazon de Jesus	1,716	2,004	2,023	1,761	1,523	Concepcion
Cristo Rey	27,748	24,623	–	–	–	Capas
Cruz	1,806	1,540	1,359	1,294	1,095	Victoria
Cubcub	486	356	311	283	225	Mayantoc
Cubcub (Poblacion)	3,373	3,865	3,160	2,737	2,611	Capas
Culatingan	3,071	3,082	2,647	2,249	2,509	Concepcion
Culipat	1,401	1,365	1,147	859	731	Tarlac City
Culubasa	356	326	384	154	271	Bamban
Cut-Cut I	410	571	443	645	713	Tarlac City
Cut-Cut II	6,890	7,392	5,861	2,348	1,981	Tarlac City
Cutcut 1st	9,415	9,397	6,771	6,151	5,650	Capas
Cutcut 2nd	6,697	6,361	4,986	4,817	3,177	Capas
Dalayap	3,094	2,952	2,536	2,203	1,856	Tarlac City
Daldalayap	621	629	536	499	366	San Clemente
Danzo	1,542	1,706	1,420	1,202	1,158	Gerona
Dapdap	1,406	1,384	1,176	1,074	957	Paniqui
David	1,480	1,442	1,226	1,149	–	San Jose
Dela Cruz	1,867	1,806	1,375	902	2,613	Bamban
Dela Paz	2,724	2,512	1,435	1,212	1,186	Tarlac City
Dicolor	1,801	1,908	1,835	1,538	1,523	Gerona
Doclong 1	793	857	755	697	658	San Clemente
Doclong 2	691	714	625	563	550	San Clemente
Dolores	2,615	2,059	1,841	1,755	1,423	Tarlac City
Dolores	5,455	5,690	3,868	3,107	2,611	Capas
Don Basilio	1,144	818	761	655	611	Gerona
Don Ramon	411	386	371	347	343	Anao
Dumarais	3,891	3,884	3,166	2,606	2,527	La Paz
Dungan	837	677	484	314	713	Concepcion
Dutung-A-Matas	4,753	4,339	4,395	3,600	1,538	Concepcion
Estacion	3,769	3,814	3,952	3,917	3,403	Paniqui
Estipona	4,188	3,592	3,840	3,359	3,386	Pura
Estrada (Calingcuan)	3,133	3,008	2,274	1,811	1,532	Capas
Florida	850	855	640	664	594	Camiling
Gayonggayong	414	361	322	340	328	Mayantoc
Gossood	767	757	749	682	623	Mayantoc
Green Village	1,914	2,403	1,956	1,683	1,611	Concepcion
Guevarra	4,406	4,440	3,872	3,246	3,162	La Paz
Guiteb	3,344	3,289	2,574	2,490	2,196	Ramos
Hernando	419	462	425	405	343	Anao
Iba	4,559	4,487	4,037	3,531	2,771	San Jose
Kapanikian	1,909	1,953	1,601	1,216	1,160	La Paz
La Paz	1,060	1,061	788	499	2,312	Bamban
La Purisima	2,777	2,890	2,400	1,902	1,758	La Paz
Labney	1,604	1,643	1,438	1,300	1,029	San Jose
Labney	922	980	1,001	844	627	Mayantoc
Lalapac	2,018	1,935	1,864	1,732	1,444	Victoria
Lanat	2,151	1,957	1,922	1,826	1,592	San Manuel
Laoang	2,728	2,554	2,115	1,670	–	Tarlac City
Lapsing	1,577	1,488	1,304	1,286	1,067	Moncada
Lara	1,198	1,259	1,054	942	890	La Paz
Lasong	873	835	798	604	586	Camiling
Laungcupang	1,911	1,907	1,784	1,621	1,445	La Paz
Lawacamulag	1,294	1,235	1,072	939	699	San Jose
Lawy	6,149	6,160	5,396	5,377	5,350	Capas
Legaspi	2,062	2,115	1,853	1,710	1,512	San Manuel
Libueg	2,489	2,876	2,324	1,917	1,870	Camiling
Ligtasan	2,816	3,256	3,217	2,645	3,299	Tarlac City
Lilibangan	988	939	794	738	785	Concepcion
Linao	1,322	1,391	1,182	975	928	Pura
Lomboy	3,372	3,363	2,897	2,423	2,168	La Paz
Lourdes	2,365	2,546	2,204	1,859	1,487	Tarlac City
Lourdes	4,575	3,526	2,444	898	5,033	Bamban
Lubigan	1,356	1,193	1,215	977	699	San Jose
Luna	1,826	1,654	1,412	1,270	1,106	Gerona
Maamot	2,421	2,352	2,103	1,977	1,520	San Jose
Maasin	1,787	1,757	2,216	2,305	901	San Clemente
Maasin	720	648	650	568	557	Pura
Mababanaba	3,559	3,293	3,295	2,680	2,627	San Jose
Mabilang	2,337	2,223	1,967	1,491	1,428	Paniqui
Mabilog	2,773	2,590	2,278	2,056	1,728	Concepcion
Mabini	1,556	1,637	1,311	1,090	1,008	Gerona
Mabini	1,990	1,941	1,888	1,774	1,566	Moncada
Mabini	827	842	630	981	920	Tarlac City
Macaguing	696	660	638	576	553	Santa Ignacia
Macalong	2,069	2,104	1,865	1,679	1,539	La Paz
Magao	1,969	1,715	1,446	1,661	2,431	Concepcion
Magaspac	4,527	4,524	4,116	3,756	3,464	Gerona
Malacampa	5,062	4,842	4,004	3,425	3,245	Camiling
Malayep	1,500	1,627	1,362	1,223	1,277	Gerona
Maligaya	3,626	4,542	3,752	2,992	2,807	Tarlac City
Maliwalo	10,629	9,322	7,656	6,514	5,714	Tarlac City
Malonzo	71	8	–	–	811	Bamban
Maluac	1,597	1,419	1,420	1,308	1,150	Moncada
Maluid	2,729	2,789	2,406	2,075	1,765	Victoria
Malupa	1,270	1,119	836	783	1,463	Concepcion
Mamonit	2,305	2,181	1,922	1,980	1,830	Mayantoc
Manakem	626	564	529	470	433	Camiling
Manaois	1,130	1,039	1,126	916	942	Paniqui
Manga	1,654	1,517	1,279	1,087	840	Capas
Mangandingay	1,188	1,163	1,045	942	848	San Manuel
Mangolago	2,136	1,879	1,782	1,690	1,545	Victoria
Maniniog	755	714	659	654	616	Mayantoc
Manlapig	1,973	2,155	1,679	1,450	1,386	Capas
Manupeg	330	301	250	235	229	Camiling
Mapalacsiao	4,980	5,025	4,783	4,225	3,947	Tarlac City
Mapalad	547	534	575	518	450	Tarlac City
Mapandan	1,406	1,497	1,236	933	1,003	Mayantoc
Marawi	1,557	1,355	1,245	1,117	1,036	Camiling
Maruglu	1,709	1,524	981	650	1,084	Capas
Masalasa	1,512	1,449	1,363	1,240	1,174	Victoria
Matadero	2,449	2,450	1,826	1,491	1,417	Tarlac City
Matalapitap	1,742	1,313	1,318	1,152	1,029	Paniqui
Matapitap	1,229	1,256	1,150	962	904	Gerona
Matarannoc	976	828	846	723	686	San Manuel
Matatalaib	21,117	20,309	16,299	13,892	12,808	Tarlac City
Matayumcab	1,529	1,294	1,397	1,214	1,170	Gerona
Matayumtayum	2,753	2,784	2,409	2,003	1,793	La Paz
Matindeg	1,075	939	874	843	766	Pura
Matubog	1,588	1,712	1,380	1,146	1,145	Camiling
Maungib	1,354	1,570	1,368	1,165	1,108	Pura
Mayang	1,606	1,657	1,366	1,086	1,046	La Paz
Minane	3,527	3,376	3,476	3,307	3,550	Concepcion
Moriones	3,309	3,224	2,574	2,168	1,542	San Jose
Motrico	2,946	3,225	2,601	2,015	1,987	La Paz
Nagmisaan	999	992	904	787	701	Paniqui
Nagrambacan	296	298	249	219	212	Camiling
Nagsabaran	945	836	729	596	566	San Clemente
Nagserialan	1,548	1,465	1,167	1,067	994	Camiling
Nambalan	1,443	1,146	939	814	746	Mayantoc
Nambalan	2,111	2,169	1,999	1,670	1,692	Santa Ignacia
Nancamarinan	3,690	3,431	3,146	2,922	2,597	Paniqui
Naya	924	905	774	633	594	Pura
New Salem	1,206	1,056	886	873	767	Gerona
Nilasin 1st	1,098	1,201	1,007	801	818	Pura
Nilasin 2nd	1,122	1,128	1,137	1,076	988	Pura
Nipaco	1,561	1,474	1,513	1,365	1,374	Paniqui
O'Donnell	12,989	13,378	10,783	9,397	10,723	Capas
Oloybuaya	1,034	924	926	740	713	Gerona
Pacpaco	1,059	878	895	934	869	San Manuel
Padapada	1,097	906	888	752	639	Gerona
Padapada	3,188	2,958	2,662	2,473	2,028	Santa Ignacia
Palacpalac	1,718	1,824	1,568	1,417	1,211	Victoria
Palimbo-Caarosipan	3,077	2,967	2,525	2,226	1,952	Camiling
Palimbo Proper	1,015	811	770	806	743	Camiling
Paludpud	1,624	1,529	1,336	1,232	1,069	La Paz
Panalicsian (Panalicsican)	1,199	1,223	1,062	855	894	Concepcion
Pance	4,122	3,797	3,592	3,279	2,703	Ramos
Pando	2,282	2,610	2,259	1,838	1,546	Concepcion
Pao	1,727	1,611	1,727	1,555	1,111	San Jose
Pao 1st	1,130	993	1,009	918	745	Camiling
Pao 2nd	461	428	420	400	377	Camiling
Pao 3rd	779	755	757	641	582	Camiling
Papaac	995	931	709	714	640	Camiling
Paraiso	3,724	3,742	3,220	2,513	2,626	Tarlac City
Parang	3,080	3,172	2,800	2,398	2,152	Concepcion
Parsolingan	2,856	2,599	2,317	2,090	1,722	Gerona
Parulung	1,582	1,446	1,403	1,196	1,004	Concepcion
Patalan	2,697	2,475	2,115	1,892	1,570	Paniqui
Pedro L. Quines	1,794	1,490	1,397	1,338	1,130	Mayantoc
Pilpila	2,144	2,345	1,889	1,540	1,474	Santa Ignacia
Pinasling (Pinasung)	3,407	3,460	3,010	2,609	2,365	Gerona
Pindangan 1st	907	1,139	802	522	486	Camiling
Pindangan 2nd	1,820	1,963	1,711	1,430	1,323	Camiling
Pinpinas	955	895	856	730	753	Santa Ignacia
Pit-ao	1,213	1,224	1,175	1,116	1,009	San Clemente
Pitabunan	2,584	2,283	1,465	1,281	1,152	Concepcion
Pitombayog	2,089	1,789	1,403	1,212	1,188	Mayantoc
Plastado	1,489	1,249	1,251	1,045	992	Gerona
Poblacion	1,377	1,307	1,194	1,133	930	San Manuel
Poblacion	272	303	415	599	991	Tarlac City
Poblacion	363	333	383	409	354	Anao
Poblacion 1	1,198	1,103	1,176	1,152	1,083	Pura
Poblacion 1	1,504	1,522	1,641	1,680	1,595	Moncada
Poblacion 1	2,599	2,502	2,583	2,304	2,260	Gerona
Poblacion 2	1,127	1,167	1,174	1,039	978	Pura
Poblacion 2	1,239	912	1,138	1,172	1,254	Gerona
Poblacion 2	1,744	1,738	1,752	1,679	1,651	Moncada
Poblacion 3	1,287	1,113	1,152	1,147	1,054	Pura
Poblacion 3	2,025	1,908	1,998	1,819	1,516	Gerona
Poblacion 3	948	915	958	872	750	Moncada
Poblacion 4	1,058	1,059	942	906	883	Moncada
Poblacion A	1,424	1,464	1,610	1,738	1,800	Camiling
Poblacion B	1,651	1,687	1,689	1,679	1,824	Camiling
Poblacion C	1,242	1,218	1,238	1,378	1,340	Camiling
Poblacion Center	1,644	1,749	1,557	1,419	1,437	Ramos
Poblacion D	1,177	1,179	1,271	1,221	1,102	Camiling
Poblacion E	1,242	1,126	1,154	1,099	1,064	Camiling
Poblacion East	3,499	3,855	3,293	2,987	2,514	Santa Ignacia
Poblacion F	1,114	1,215	1,127	1,215	1,105	Camiling
Poblacion G	1,163	1,308	1,273	1,135	1,102	Camiling
Poblacion H	1,140	1,260	1,315	1,274	1,274	Camiling
Poblacion I	1,118	1,102	1,134	1,261	1,314	Camiling
Poblacion J	629	663	703	848	814	Camiling
Poblacion Norte	1,069	1,050	1,028	994	966	San Clemente
Poblacion Norte	3,367	2,686	2,738	2,705	2,369	Mayantoc
Poblacion Norte	8,449	7,938	7,657	7,088	6,655	Paniqui
Poblacion North	1,499	1,485	1,164	1,188	1,059	Ramos
Poblacion South	2,333	2,234	1,846	1,741	1,519	Ramos
Poblacion Sur	1,695	1,656	1,637	1,595	1,547	San Clemente
Poblacion Sur	3,077	2,884	2,778	2,574	2,432	Mayantoc
Poblacion Sur	5,270	5,266	5,460	5,272	4,850	Paniqui
Poblacion West	2,968	3,283	2,859	2,705	2,330	Santa Ignacia
Poroc	782	707	628	536	545	Pura
Pugo-Cecilio	1,637	1,463	1,113	1,041	797	Santa Ignacia
Quezon	1,267	1,136	1,163	1,048	996	Gerona
Rang-ayan	1,924	1,981	1,804	1,747	1,740	Paniqui
Rizal	1,179	1,173	1,039	813	719	Gerona
Rizal	1,391	1,489	1,456	1,351	1,127	Moncada
Rizal	1,518	1,597	1,298	1,084	1,023	La Paz
Rizal	796	715	709	678	593	Anao
Rotrottooc	1,172	1,091	798	796	722	Mayantoc
Salapungan	1,645	1,680	1,646	1,742	1,470	Tarlac City
Salapungan	2,295	2,362	1,913	1,430	1,256	Gerona
Salcedo	2,347	2,325	1,926	1,752	1,659	San Manuel
Salumague	3,062	2,821	2,598	2,467	2,306	Paniqui
Samput	4,348	3,974	3,414	2,962	2,519	Paniqui
San Agustin	1,314	1,264	1,225	1,142	1,031	Gerona
San Agustin	1,795	1,655	1,516	1,406	1,340	San Manuel
San Agustin	2,981	2,607	2,482	2,474	2,026	Victoria
San Agustin (Murcia)	5,776	4,727	4,535	4,046	3,218	Concepcion
San Andres	2,193	2,021	1,771	1,643	1,352	Victoria
San Antonio	2,570	2,580	2,266	1,919	1,998	Concepcion
San Antonio	2,814	2,735	2,365	2,085	1,942	Gerona
San Bartolome	1,024	930	779	713	607	Gerona
San Bartolome	1,576	1,530	1,542	1,463	1,424	Mayantoc
San Bartolome	1,871	1,805	1,661	1,539	1,634	Concepcion
San Carlos	1,217	1,258	1,259	1,098	953	Paniqui
San Carlos	1,437	1,497	1,287	1,068	909	Tarlac City
San Felipe	2,649	2,634	2,268	1,986	1,890	San Manuel
San Fernando (Poblacion)	2,923	3,123	2,639	2,392	2,280	Victoria
San Francisco	1,459	1,451	1,092	999	797	Victoria
San Francisco	2,298	2,218	1,924	1,695	1,666	Santa Ignacia
San Francisco	2,788	2,786	2,215	1,786	1,647	Tarlac City
San Francisco	7,354	6,601	5,584	5,083	4,374	Concepcion
San Francisco East	557	530	502	423	385	Anao
San Francisco West	1,038	1,140	995	926	767	Anao
San Gavino (Poblacion)	2,367	2,354	2,119	2,091	1,880	Victoria
San Isidro	1,841	1,680	1,576	1,405	1,271	Paniqui
San Isidro	11,432	10,084	8,670	7,522	6,224	Tarlac City
San Isidro (Almendras)	2,828	2,388	2,318	2,371	2,139	Concepcion
San Isidro (Poblacion)	3,141	3,350	3,106	3,127	3,139	La Paz
San Jacinto	1,047	1,181	1,009	889	931	San Manuel
San Jacinto	2,895	2,617	2,446	2,452	2,176	Victoria
San Jose	1,247	1,104	1,225	1,331	1,271	Gerona
San Jose	1,547	1,437	1,370	1,313	1,260	Mayantoc
San Jose	6,423	6,715	5,172	4,013	3,527	Tarlac City
San Jose (Poblacion)	9,351	10,291	8,718	8,072	7,591	Concepcion
San Jose de Urquico	1,666	1,730	902	704	511	Tarlac City
San Jose North	407	445	380	323	319	Anao
San Jose South	392	398	409	403	336	Anao
San Juan	2,004	1,765	1,585	1,487	1,367	Moncada
San Juan	460	515	464	444	421	Anao
San Juan	538	549	477	433	352	Ramos
San Juan (Castro)	4,123	3,796	2,838	2,505	1,986	Concepcion
San Juan de Mata	3,760	4,146	2,763	2,198	1,908	Tarlac City
San Juan de Milla	859	813	787	747	630	Paniqui
San Juan de Valdez	1,236	1,296	1,214	1,080	905	San Jose
San Julian	2,616	2,612	2,234	2,087	1,696	Moncada
San Leon	1,214	1,225	1,024	1,028	865	Moncada
San Luis	2,761	2,626	1,895	1,600	1,048	Tarlac City
San Manuel	6,343	6,767	5,291	4,382	3,866	Tarlac City
San Martin	376	141	29	–	1,220	Concepcion
San Miguel	2,101	2,210	1,877	1,733	1,534	San Manuel
San Miguel	9,239	9,600	8,507	8,055	8,533	Tarlac City
San Narciso	1,433	1,350	1,220	1,078	936	San Manuel
San Nicolas	6,508	8,607	8,407	9,750	9,755	Tarlac City
San Nicolas (Poblacion)	18,937	20,802	15,761	5,845	5,499	Bamban
San Nicolas (Poblacion)	2,674	3,059	2,672	2,472	2,286	Victoria
San Nicolas (Poblacion)	5,412	3,985	4,317	3,622	3,891	Concepcion
San Nicolas Balas	2,876	2,463	2,097	1,768	2,046	Concepcion
San Pablo	4,490	4,907	4,474	3,989	3,714	Tarlac City
San Pascual	3,006	2,818	2,177	1,782	1,669	Tarlac City
San Pedro	130	158	20	–	2,069	Bamban
San Pedro	759	800	760	854	670	Moncada
San Rafael	1,483	1,367	912	779	684	Bamban
San Rafael	14,644	14,940	11,277	10,778	8,601	Tarlac City
San Raymundo	1,229	1,214	1,014	880	776	Ramos
San Roque	1,133	985	964	914	824	Moncada
San Roque	10,043	10,375	8,641	1,745	2,088	Bamban
San Roque	6,894	7,516	7,487	7,684	8,194	Tarlac City
San Roque	830	746	701	649	569	Anao
San Roque (Poblacion)	7,659	8,095	6,604	5,617	5,060	La Paz
San Sebastian	3,796	4,735	4,790	4,609	3,820	Tarlac City
San Sotero	751	723	566	547	411	Santa Ignacia
San Vicente	1,538	1,479	1,204	988	777	San Manuel
San Vicente	1,993	1,547	872	1,089	1,201	Bamban
San Vicente	16,261	17,110	14,223	14,759	13,801	Tarlac City
San Vicente	2,001	2,244	1,853	1,692	1,726	Victoria
San Vicente	2,383	2,236	2,119	2,096	1,877	Santa Ignacia
San Vicente (Caluis/Cobra)	1,668	1,462	1,114	1,090	1,049	Concepcion
Santa Barbara	4,988	3,915	3,424	3,364	3,132	Victoria
Santa Cruz	4,793	4,743	4,195	3,653	3,309	Concepcion
Santa Cruz (Alvindia Primero)	3,700	3,605	3,464	2,904	2,375	Tarlac City
Santa Ines	1,660	1,463	1,558	1,339	1,323	Paniqui
Santa Ines Centro	2,059	1,861	1,719	1,609	1,332	Santa Ignacia
Santa Ines East	2,264	2,329	1,977	1,839	1,585	Santa Ignacia
Santa Ines West	1,843	1,595	1,441	1,312	1,116	Santa Ignacia
Santa Juliana	5,302	4,026	2,614	2,207	2,520	Capas
Santa Lucia	787	691	674	617	560	Gerona
Santa Lucia	9,494	9,360	7,627	6,426	6,182	Capas
Santa Lucia (Poblacion)	1,559	1,669	1,458	1,347	1,144	Victoria
Santa Lucia East	1,067	771	737	799	689	Moncada
Santa Lucia West	948	905	828	733	688	Moncada
Santa Maria	1,019	983	537	860	745	Tarlac City
Santa Maria	1,530	1,504	1,080	863	649	Concepcion
Santa Maria	1,547	1,494	1,361	1,246	1,100	San Manuel
Santa Maria	1,990	2,240	2,080	1,749	1,450	Moncada
Santa Maria	2,232	2,578	2,136	1,916	1,797	Camiling
Santa Monica	1,691	1,636	1,604	1,470	1,170	Moncada
Santa Monica	5,500	5,705	4,832	3,944	4,231	Concepcion
Santa Rita	1,892	1,683	1,498	1,327	1,142	Capas
Santa Rita	3,934	3,444	2,228	1,866	4,885	Concepcion
Santa Rosa	3,972	4,381	3,450	2,945	3,012	Concepcion
Santiago	1,871	2,035	1,697	1,371	1,350	Gerona
Santiago	4,624	4,929	3,879	3,102	3,113	Concepcion
Santo Cristo	1,315	1,369	1,160	910	879	Concepcion
Santo Cristo	2,854	3,938	3,818	3,357	5,818	Tarlac City
Santo Domingo	1,126	955	863	675	656	Tarlac City
Santo Domingo	348	349	296	256	235	Anao
Santo Domingo 1st	2,591	2,493	1,982	3,875	1,948	Capas
Santo Domingo 2nd	6,025	6,340	4,834	–	4,016	Capas
Santo Niño	1,906	1,947	2,078	1,847	986	Bamban
Santo Niño	3,382	3,094	2,618	2,358	1,766	Concepcion
Santo Niño	602	703	598	462	380	Tarlac City
Santo Rosario	6,898	6,897	4,829	3,668	2,924	Capas
Santo Rosario (Magunting)	1,719	1,476	1,447	1,303	1,269	Concepcion
Sapang Maragul	10,235	9,191	6,815	5,330	4,532	Tarlac City
Sapang Tagalog	5,096	4,713	3,222	2,826	2,716	Tarlac City
Sawat	1,091	1,099	1,003	920	830	Camiling
Sembrano	1,455	2,901	1,262	1,101	902	Gerona
Sepung Calzada	4,367	4,668	3,974	3,142	2,937	Tarlac City
Sierra	2,082	2,137	1,697	1,327	1,184	La Paz
Sinait	2,022	2,044	2,002	1,786	1,503	Tarlac City
Sinense	1,039	1,281	974	817	717	Anao
Singat	1,422	1,355	1,128	963	827	Gerona
Singat	1,575	1,549	1,317	1,180	1,200	Pura
Sinigpit	1,855	1,771	1,513	1,593	1,452	Paniqui
Sinilian 1st	1,318	1,537	1,286	1,067	1,160	Camiling
Sinilian 2nd	1,094	1,011	904	858	775	Camiling
Sinilian 3rd	1,472	1,528	1,364	1,241	1,272	Camiling
Sinilian Cacalibosoan	943	853	894	841	902	Camiling
Sinulatan 1st	1,470	1,157	1,250	1,184	1,050	Camiling
Sinulatan 2nd	515	493	494	430	428	Camiling
Suaverdez	898	829	757	673	546	Anao
Suizo	4,096	4,366	4,657	3,436	1,919	Tarlac City
Sula	3,491	2,867	3,028	2,600	2,107	San Jose
Sulipa	1,590	1,425	1,527	1,423	1,428	Gerona
Surgui 1st	1,182	1,146	902	797	702	Camiling
Surgui 2nd	1,346	1,514	1,243	1,005	1,037	Camiling
Surgui 3rd	1,317	1,407	1,149	978	1,086	Camiling
Tablang	2,449	2,288	2,357	2,041	1,902	Paniqui
Taguiporo	518	487	466	510	326	Santa Ignacia
Tagumbao	4,371	4,437	3,901	3,317	3,288	Gerona
Talaga	5,276	4,958	4,108	3,480	2,090	Capas
Taldiapan	700	659	569	529	512	Mayantoc
Talimunduc Marimla	1,526	1,476	1,273	1,086	1,112	Concepcion
Talimunduc San Miguel	2,285	2,297	2,129	2,004	1,713	Concepcion
Tambugan	1,432	1,636	1,223	1,015	1,046	Camiling
Tangcaran	697	755	754	684	607	Gerona
Tangcarang	1,162	1,229	947	756	734	Mayantoc
Tariji	2,600	2,182	2,058	1,778	1,542	Tarlac City
Telabanca	230	143	28	13	2,249	Concepcion
Telbang	1,118	1,074	725	629	556	Camiling
Tibag	15,428	12,429	8,901	6,793	7,345	Tarlac City
Tibagan	4,804	4,416	3,221	2,737	2,414	Tarlac City
Timmaguab	2,167	2,165	1,858	1,533	1,327	Santa Ignacia
Tinang	4,070	4,240	3,722	3,284	2,989	Concepcion
Toledo	1,893	1,986	1,578	1,435	1,252	Ramos
Tolega Norte	839	796	754	763	712	Moncada
Tolega Sur	1,282	1,170	875	914	826	Moncada
Trinidad (Trinidad Primero)	1,469	1,380	1,128	906	781	Tarlac City
Tubectubang	2,225	2,030	1,624	1,493	1,334	Moncada
Tuec	904	877	993	815	699	Camiling
Ungot	3,588	3,562	3,538	2,726	1,875	Tarlac City
Vargas	2,802	2,675	2,451	2,188	1,837	Santa Ignacia
Ventenilla	2,449	1,984	2,010	1,727	1,643	Paniqui
Villa	655	622	657	643	473	Moncada
Villa Aglipay	4,852	5,087	4,236	3,673	2,993	San Jose
Villa Bacolor	1,802	1,843	1,440	1,199	1,003	Tarlac City
Villa Paz	1,517	1,571	1,334	1,152	1,040	Gerona
Virgen de los Remedios (Pacalcal)	1,906	1,859	1,286	943	1,126	Bamban
Barangay	2010	2007	2000	1995	1990	City or municipality
*Italicized names are former names.; *Dashes (–) in cells indicate unavailable census data.

[top]
