= Taguiporo =

Taguiporo is the name of the following Philippines barangays:

- Taguiporo, Bangui, Ilocos Norte
- Taguiporo, Bantay, Ilocos Sur
- Taguiporo, Santa Ignacia, Tarlac
