= Paniqui =

Municipality in Tarlac, Philippines

Paniqui Paniki
- Municipality
- Municipality of Paniqui
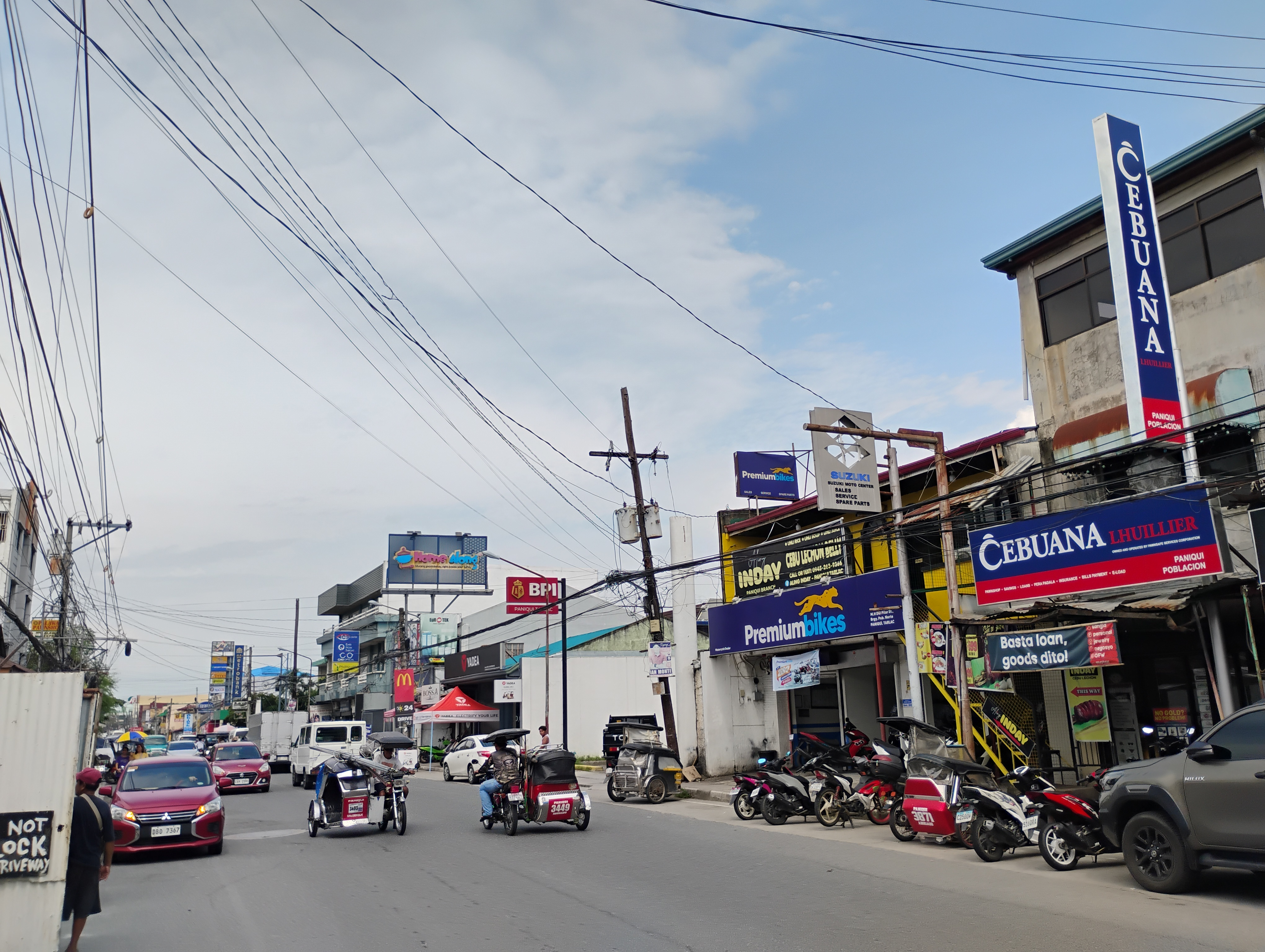
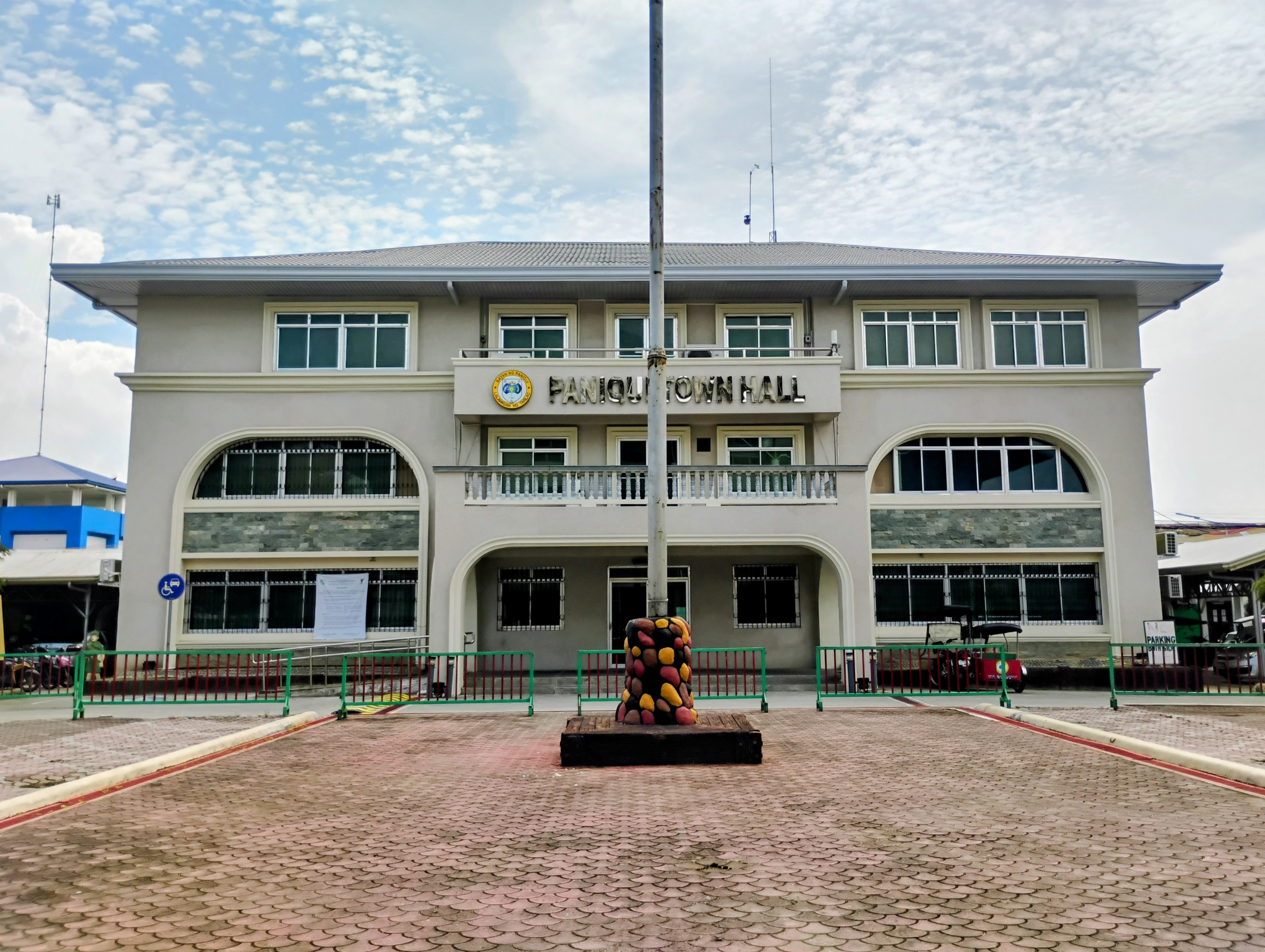
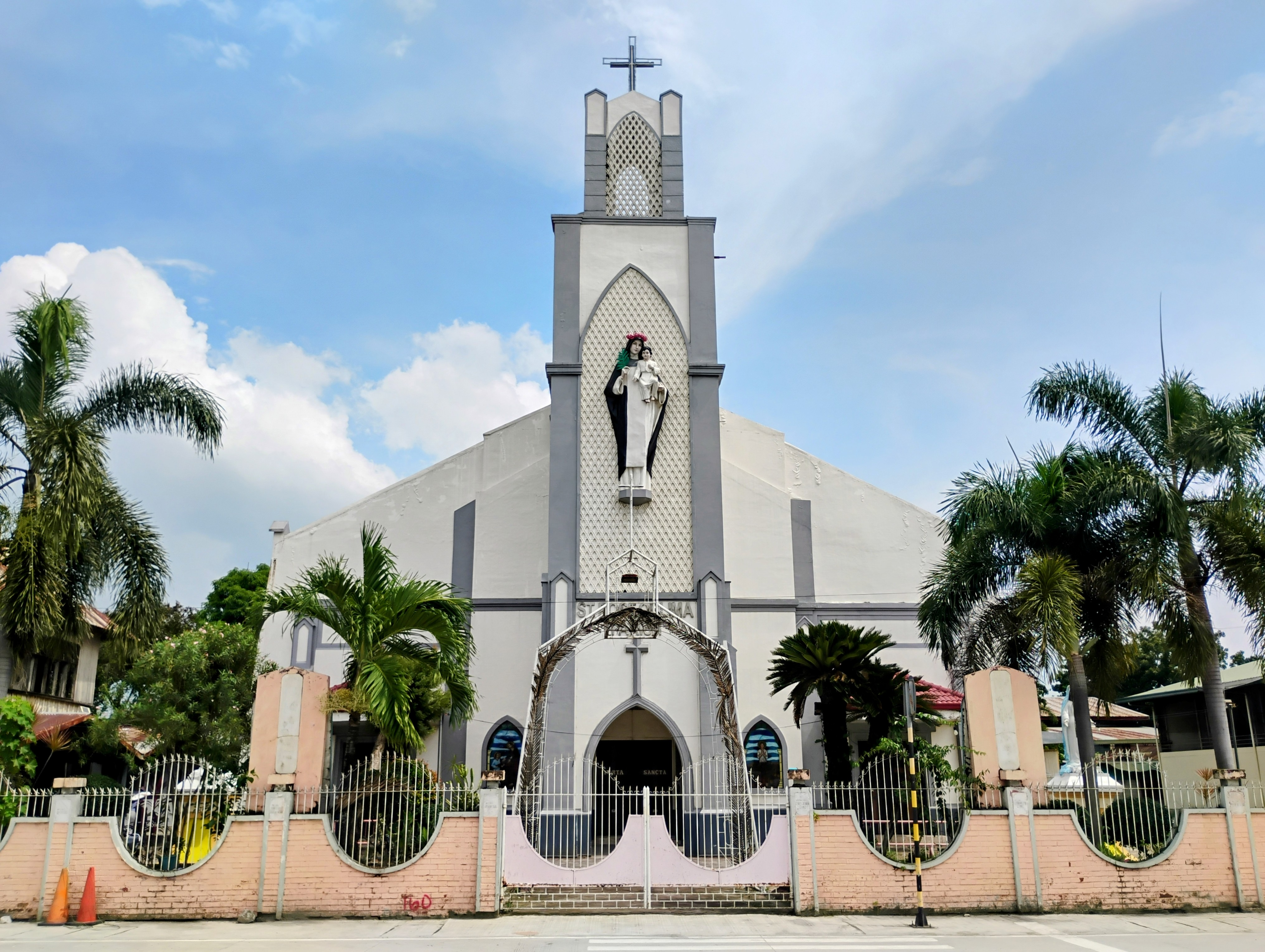
- Paniqui Town Proper Paniqui Municipal Hall Saint Rose of Lima Parish Church

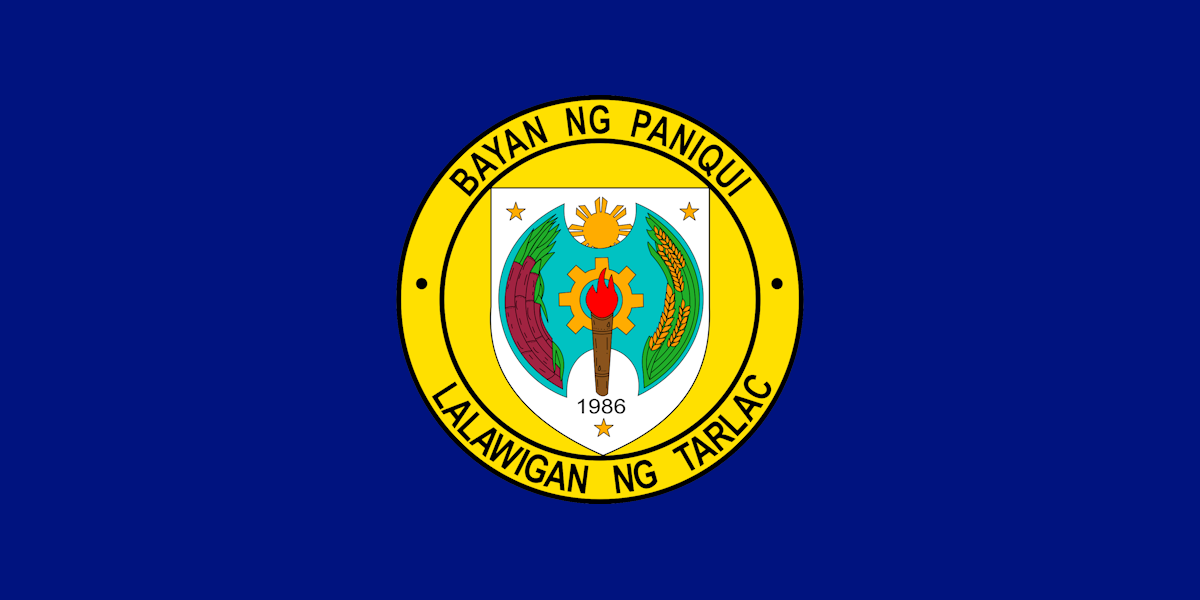
- Flag Seal
- Etymology: Paniki (Bats)
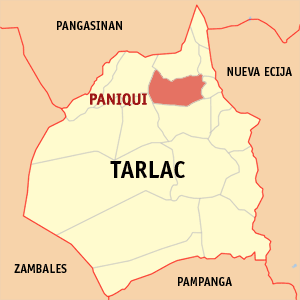
- Map of Tarlac with Paniqui highlighted
- Interactive map of Paniqui
- Location within the Philippines
- Coordinates: 15°40′05″N 120°34′44″E
- Country: Philippines
- Region: Central Luzon
- Province: Tarlac
- District: 1st district
- Founded: March 13, 1712
- Barangays: 35 (see Barangays)

Government
  - Type: Sangguniang Bayan
  - Mayor: Kathleen C. Roxas
  - Vice Mayor: Jake Roxas
  - Representative: Jaime D. Cojuangco
  - Municipal Council: Members: Felomina F. Bravo; Christian Alfred F. Cuchapin; Javerne D. Santillan; Charo L. Gonzales-Oca; Nestor B. Castro; Rachilda Myra P. Olonan-Garcia; Robert J. Torio; Mary Anne B. Fernandez
  - Electorate: 66,607 voters (2025)

Area
  - Total: 105.16 km^{2} (40.60 sq mi)
- Elevation: 21 m (69 ft)
- Highest elevation: 40 m (130 ft)
- Lowest elevation: 15 m (49 ft)

Population (2024 census)
  - Total: 106,190
  - Density: 1,009.8/km^{2} (2,615.4/sq mi)
  - Households: 24,942

Economy
  - Income class: 1st municipal income class
  - Poverty incidence: 10.25% (2023)
  - Revenue: ₱312,653,249.52 (2021)
  - Assets: ₱ 1,508 million (2024)
  - Expenditure: ₱ 352.4 million (2024)
  - Liabilities: ₱ 475.5 million (2024)

Service provider
  - Electricity: Tarlac 1 Electric Cooperative (TARELCO 1)
- Time zone: UTC+8 (PST)
- ZIP code: 2307
- PSGC: 0306910000
- IDD : area code: +63 (0)45
- Native languages: Pangasinan; Ilocano; Tagalog; Kapampangan
- Website: www.paniqui.gov.ph

Paniqui ([pɐnɪˈki]), officially the Municipality of Paniqui (Ilocano: Ili ti Paniqui; Kapampangan: Balen ning Paniqui; Pangasinan: Baley na Paniqui; Tagalog: Bayan ng Paniqui), is a municipality in the province of Tarlac, Philippines. According to the 2024 census, it has a population of 106,190 people.

The town is known as the birthplace of Corazon Aquino, the 11th President of the Philippines.

== Etymology ==
Paniqui is an Ilocanized term derived from the Ilocano word "Panpaniki" which means "bat", since the town has caves that house bats.

== History ==
The birth of Paniqui could be traced way back in 1712 when the provincial government of Pangasinan sent a group of men south of Bayambang, Pangasinan for the expansion of the Christian faith. The pioneering group was led by two brothers, Raymundo and Manuel Paragas of Dagupan and established the local government in a sitio called "manggang marikit" (mango of an unmarried woman). There is a great number of mammals called by Ilocanos "pampaniki" and it was from this term that the name Paniqui was derived.

An uprising led by Caragay during the early part of 1720 forced the Local Government in "manggang marikit" to abandon the place and to evacuate for lowland called "Acocolao", a place 2 kilometers (1.2 mi) west of the present Poblacion. It was a historical sitio where the first Filipino Moro, Sultan Ali Mudin, was baptized in 1750.

Paniqui was a sprawling town that covered a wide area that time. Some of the barrios that formerly comprised Paniqui were "San Roque", now Cuyapo; "Barong", now Gerona; "San Jose De Camiling", now Camiling; "Bani", now Ramos; "San Ramon", now Moncada; and Anao.

The period between 1750 and 1896 were painful years of Spanish tyranny and oppression because the insurrectos and sometimes bandits, who are conveniently sprouted among the people, made sporadic attacks upon the conquistadores. These attacks on the Spaniards, who came on the islands bringing the sword and the cross, were marred by cholera and smallpox epidemics punctuated by floods and typhoons.

However, a group of Paniqui patriots, welded together by a common belief of oneness, unselfish devotion for freedom and who were spurred by ruthless Spanish tyranny, organized a legitimate segment of the Katipunan on January 12, 1896, which is a far cry from the bandits that used to harass the Spaniards.

These dauntless men made daring exploits, unrecorded in the history of the Katipunan, the most prominent of which was the ambuscade of Spanish soldiers along the road going to Anao and killing a great number of them. These incidents made a prelude to the end of the Spanish occupation in Paniqui.

The advent of American occupation saw a happy transition from the almost aristocratic and enigmatic characteristic of Spanish conquistadores to the democratic way of life under American tutelage.

== Geography ==
Paniqui is situated between the towns of Gerona to the south, Moncada to the north, Anao and Ramos to the east, and Camiling and Santa Ignacia to the west.

The town was originally part of the province of Pangasinan. It is first known as Manggang Marikit, a sitio of Pangasinan, in 1571 and as Pampaniki in 1686.

Paniqui is 146 kilometers (91 mi) from the nation's capital Manila and is 22 kilometers (14 mi) from the provincial capital, Tarlac City.

=== Barangays ===
Paniqui is politically subdivided into 35 barangays, as shown below. Each barangay consists of puroks and some have sitios.

- Abogado
- Acocolao
- Aduas
- Apulid
- Balaoang
- Barang
- Brillante
- Burgos
- Cabayaoasan
- Canan
- Cariño
- Cayanga
- Colibangbang
- Coral
- Dapdap
- Estacion
- Mabilang
- Manaois
- Matalapitap
- Nagmisaan
- Nancamarinan
- Nipaco
- Patalan
- Poblacion Norte
- Poblacion Sur
- Rang-ayan
- Salomague
- Samput
- San Carlos
- San Isidro
- San Juan de Milla
- Santa Ines
- Sinigpit
- Tablang
- Ventenilla

=== Climate ===
Climate data for Paniqui, Tarlac
Month	Jan	Feb	Mar	Apr	May	Jun	Jul	Aug	Sep	Oct	Nov	Dec	Year
Mean daily maximum °C (°F)	30 (86)	31 (88)	33 (91)	35 (95)	33 (91)	31 (88)	30 (86)	29 (84)	29 (84)	30 (86)	31 (88)	30 (86)	31 (88)
Mean daily minimum °C (°F)	19 (66)	19 (66)	20 (68)	22 (72)	24 (75)	24 (75)	24 (75)	24 (75)	23 (73)	22 (72)	21 (70)	20 (68)	22 (71)
Average precipitation mm (inches)	3 (0.1)	2 (0.1)	5 (0.2)	10 (0.4)	80 (3.1)	107 (4.2)	138 (5.4)	147 (5.8)	119 (4.7)	70 (2.8)	26 (1.0)	8 (0.3)	715 (28.1)
Average rainy days	2.0	1.7	2.7	4.6	16.1	20.8	24.0	23.0	21.4	15.5	8.0	3.2	143
Source: Meteoblue

== Demographics ==
Population census of Paniqui
Year	Pop.	±% p.a.
1903	12,982	—
1918	16,603	+1.65%
1939	19,124	+0.68%
1948	27,554	+4.14%
1960	35,416	+2.11%
1970	47,718	+3.02%
1975	53,031	+2.14%
1980	55,006	+0.73%
1990	64,949	+1.68%
1995	70,979	+1.68%
2000	78,883	+2.29%
2007	83,311	+0.76%
2010	87,730	+1.90%
2015	92,606	+1.04%
2020	103,003	+2.26%
2024	106,190	+0.73%
Source: Philippine Statistics Authority

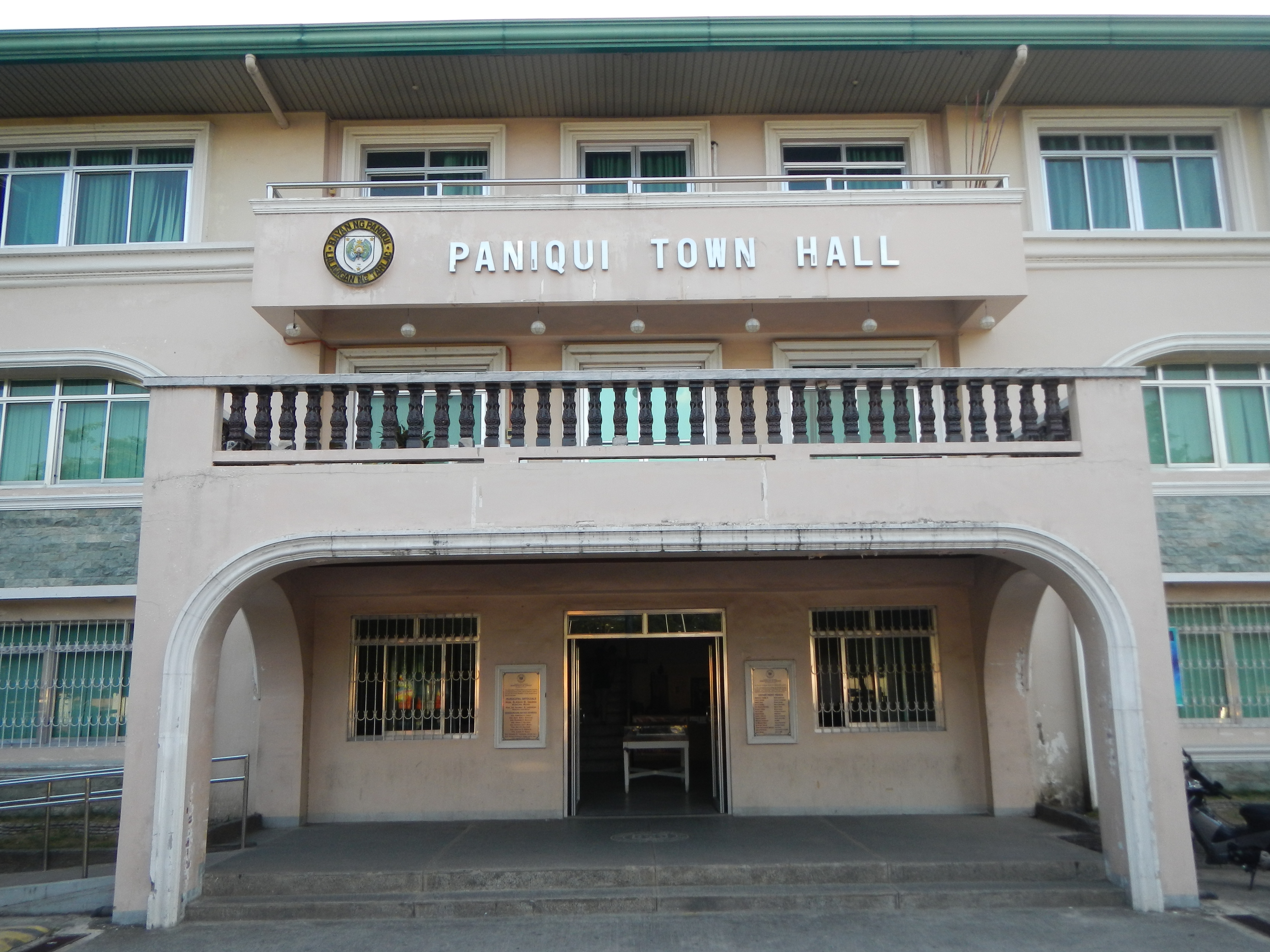
Paniqui Town Hall

In the 2024 Philippine census, the population of Paniqui was 106,190 people with a density of 1,000 inhabitants per square kilometre or 2,600 inhabitants per square mile.

=== Language ===
The language predominantly spoken is Ilocano, but Tagalog, Kapampangan and Pangasinan are also used frequently.

== Economy ==
Poverty incidence of Paniqui (%)

Source: Philippine Statistics Authority

== Education ==
There are two schools district offices that govern all educational institutions within the municipality. They oversee the management and operations of all private and public, from primary to secondary schools. These are Paniqui North Schools District Office and Paniqui South Schools District Office.

=== Primary and elementary schools ===
- AB Montessori School for Excellence
- Accelerated Learning Academy
- Acocolao Elementary School
- Aduas Elementary School
- Aldersgate Institute (formerly Paniqui Christian School)
- Apulid Elementary School
- Balaoang Elementary School
- Baltazar Elementary School
- Barang de Ybez Con Bato Elementary School
- Bethany Christian School
- Bethany Foundational Christian Academy
- Brillante Elementary School
- Burgos Elementary School
- Busy Brains Creative School
- Cabayaoasan Elementary School
- Calixto G. Duque Elementary School
- Cariño Adventist School
- Cariño Elementary School
- Cariño United Methodist Church Learning Center
- Cayanga Elementary School
- Colibangbang Ali Elementary School
- Cojuangco Elementary School
- Coral Elementary School
- Dapdap Elementary School
- Del Valle Elementary School
- Mabilang Elementary School
- Manaois Elementary School
- Nagmisaan Elementary School
- Nancamarinan Elementary School
- Nipaco Elementary School
- P.O. Domingo Montessori School
- Paniqui North Central School
- Paniqui South Central Elementary School
- Patalan Elementary School
- Ramon U. Cojuangco ES (Samput ES)
- Rang-Ayan Elementary School
- Salomague Elementary School
- Salomague Elementary School (Annex)
- San Carlos Elementary School
- San Isidro Elementary School
- San Juan De Milla Elementary School
- Sinigpit Aloha Elementary School
- St. Rose Catholic School
- St. Vincent School Foundation
- Sta. Ines Elementary School
- Tablang Elementary School
- The United Methodist Church Learning Center
- Ventenilla Elementary School
- Ysidra E. Cojuangco Elementary School

=== Secondary schools ===
- Balaoang National High School
- Central Luzon High School
- Eduardo Cojuangco National Vocational High School
- Ventinilla High School

=== Higher educational institutions ===
- CIT Colleges
- Holy Trinity College of Technology
- Interword College Foundation
- Osilla Institute for Health Personnel
- St. Paul Colleges Foundation
- St. Rose College Educational Foundation, Inc.
