= Gerona, Tarlac =

Municipality in Tarlac, Philippines

Gerona
- Municipality
- Municipality of Gerona
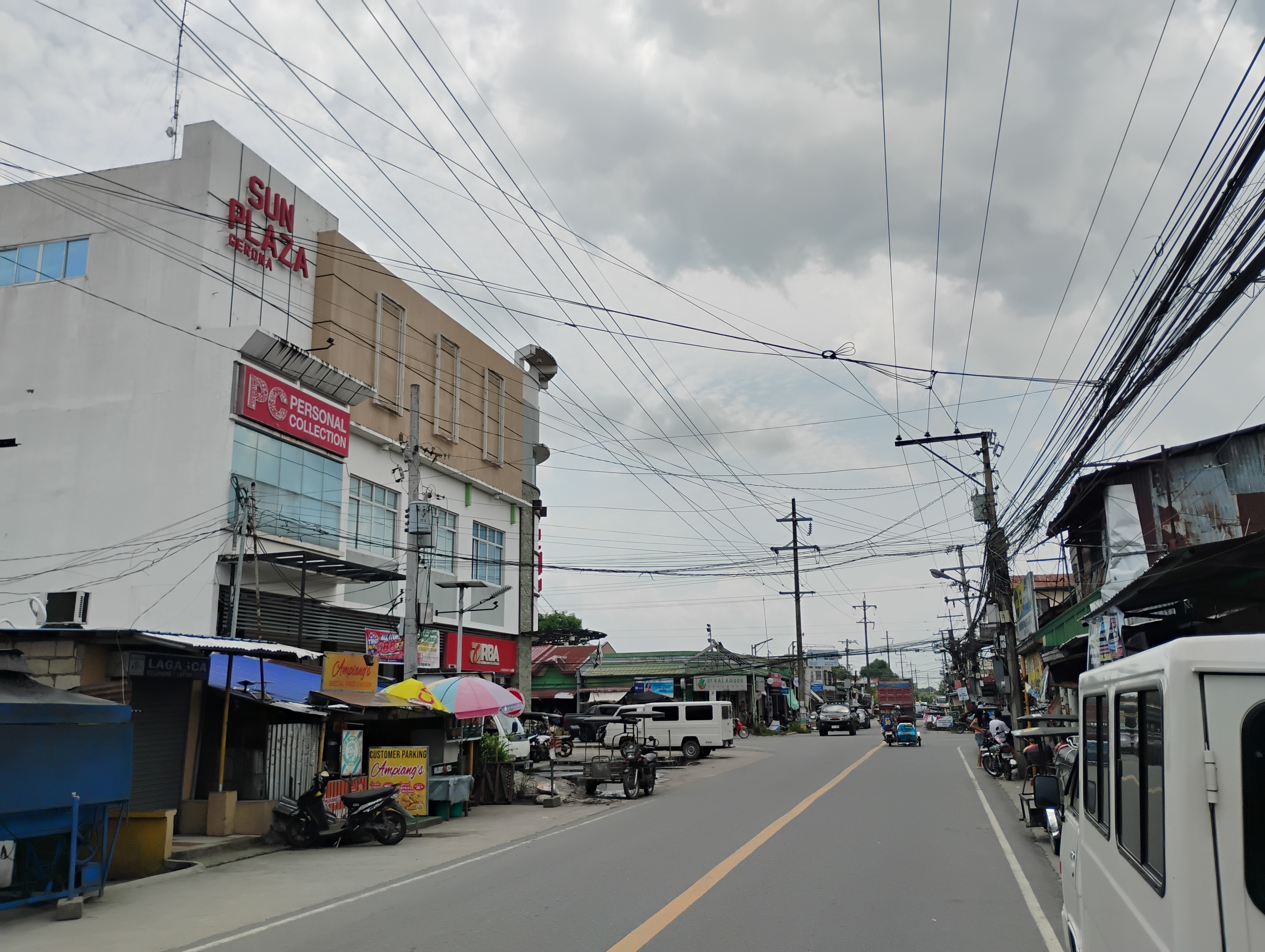
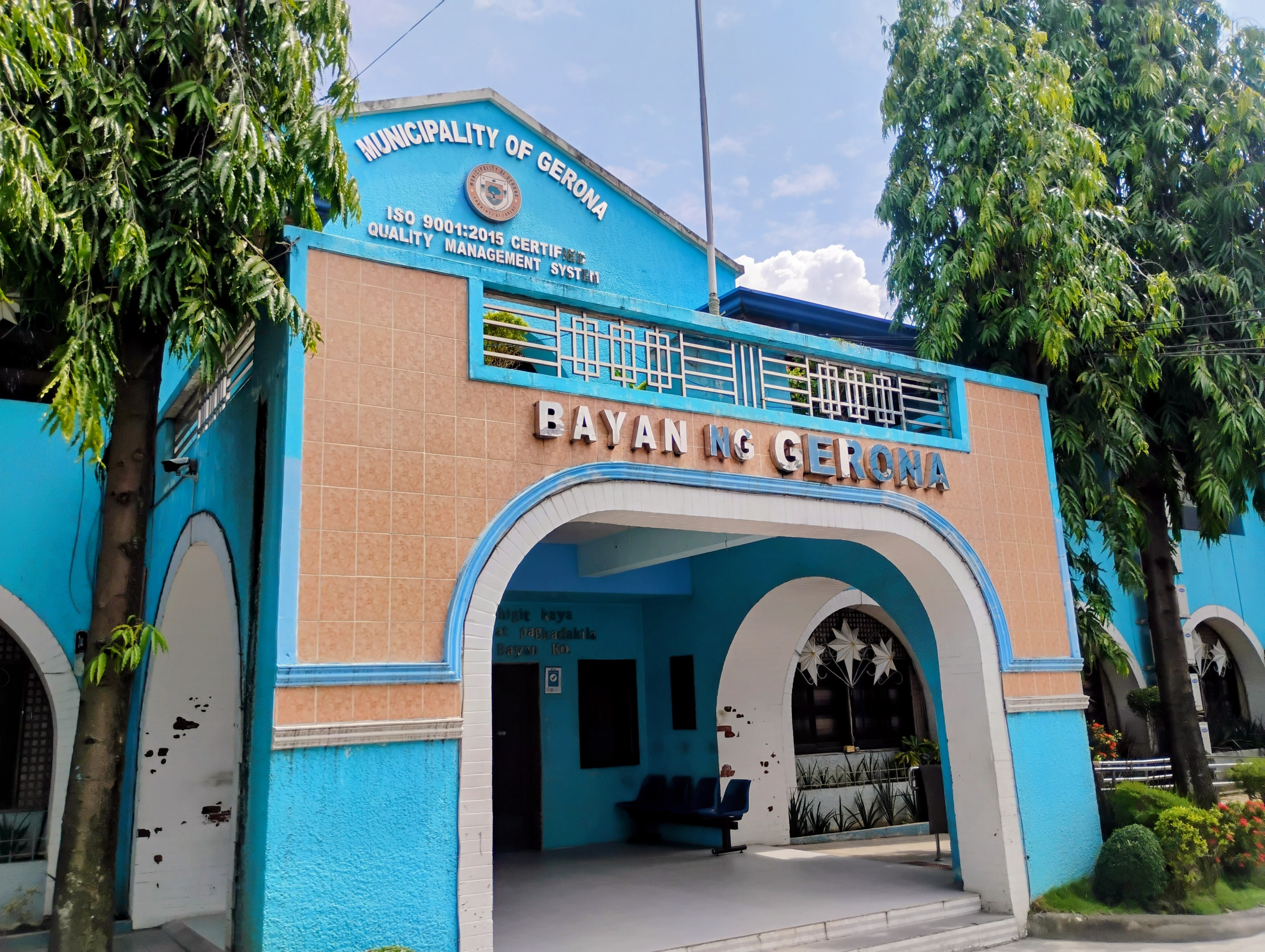
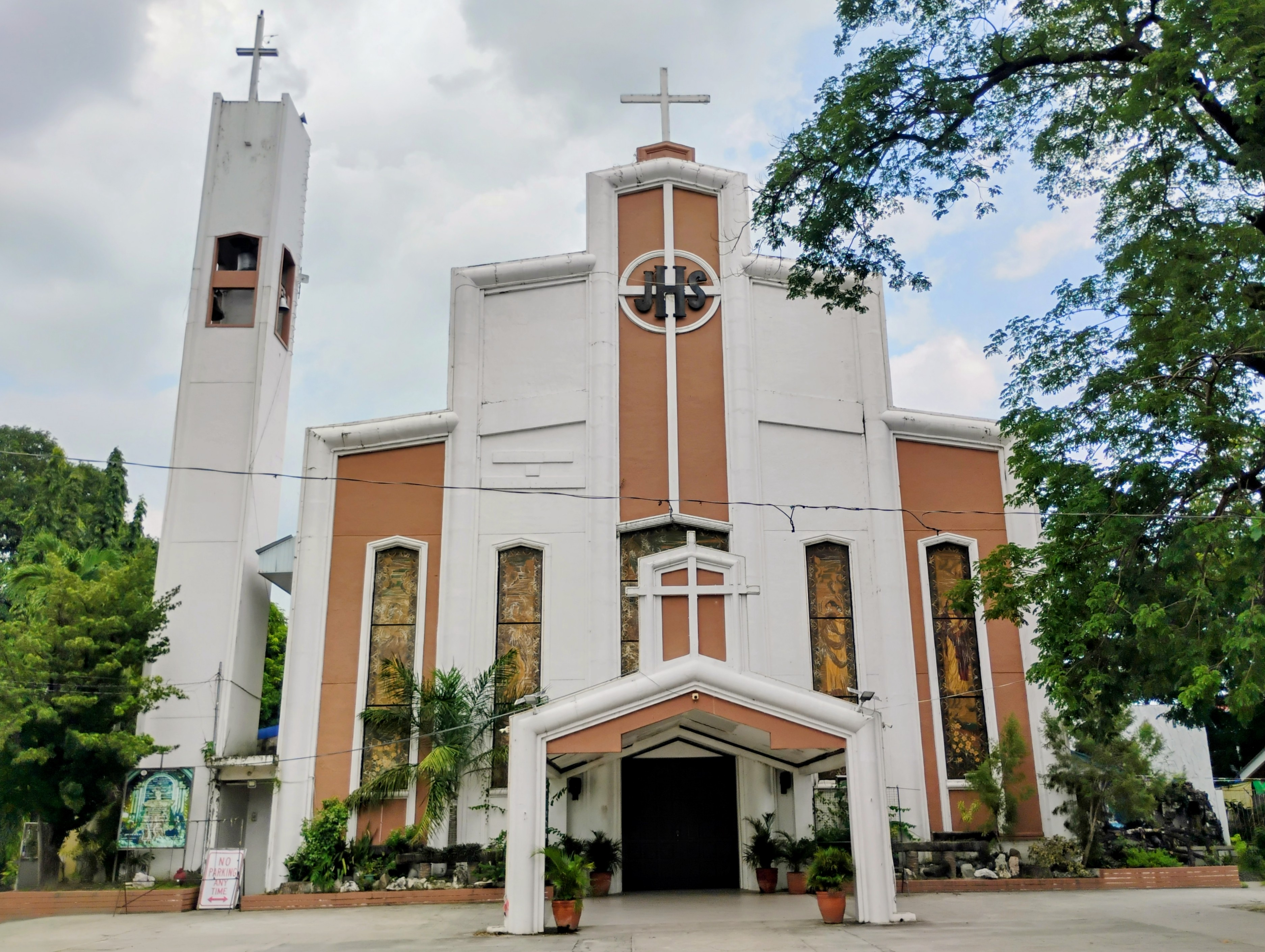
- Gerona Town Proper Gerona Municipal Hall Saint Catherine of Alexandria Church

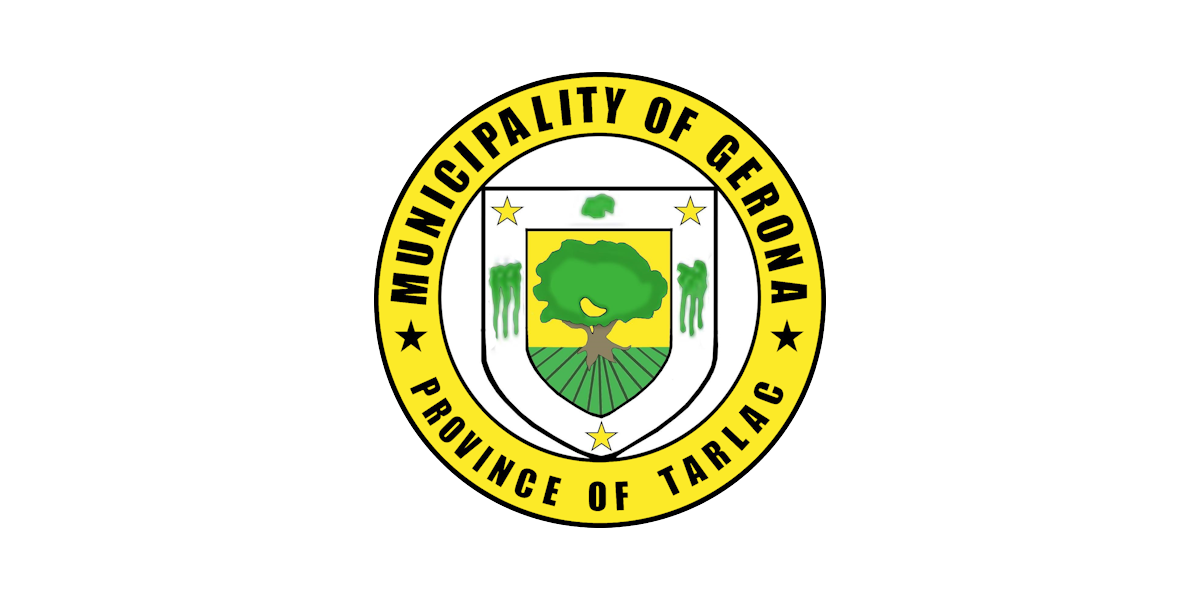
- Flag Seal

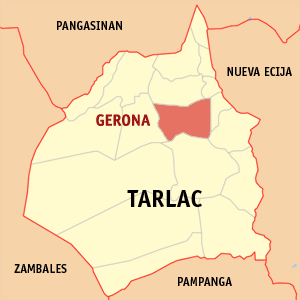
- Map of Tarlac with Gerona highlighted
- Interactive map of Gerona
- Location within the Philippines
- Coordinates: 15°36′25″N 120°35′55″E
- Country: Philippines
- Region: Central Luzon
- Province: Tarlac
- District: 2nd district
- Barangays: 44 (see Barangays)

Government
  - Type: Sangguniang Bayan
  - Mayor: Eloy C. Eclar
  - Vice Mayor: Ronald T. Go
  - Representative: Victor A. Yap
  - Electorate: 60,410 voters (2025)

Area
  - Total: 128.89 km^{2} (49.76 sq mi)
- Elevation: 29 m (95 ft)
- Highest elevation: 50 m (160 ft)
- Lowest elevation: 19 m (62 ft)

Population (2024 census)
  - Total: 97,937
  - Density: 759.85/km^{2} (1,968.0/sq mi)
  - Households: 23,696
- Demonym: Geronian

Economy
  - Income class: 1st municipal income class
  - Poverty incidence: 10.15% (2023)
  - Revenue: 260,703,176.70 (2020)
  - Assets: ₱ 1,013 million (2024)
  - Expenditure: ₱ 389 million (2024)
  - Liabilities: ₱ 235.7 million (2024)

Service provider
  - Electricity: Tarlac 1 Electric Cooperative (TARELCO 1)
- Time zone: UTC+8 (PST)
- ZIP code: 2302
- PSGC: 0306906000
- IDD : area code: +63 (0)45
- Native languages: Kapampangan; Tagalog; Ilocano
- Website: geronatarlac.gov.ph

Gerona, officially the Municipality of Gerona (Ilocano: Ili ti Gerona; Kapampangan: Balen ning Gerona, Tagalog: Bayan ng Gerona), is a municipality in the province of Tarlac, Philippines. According to the 2024 census, it has a population of 97,937 people.

== Geography ==
Gerona is one of the 17 towns of the province of Tarlac. It is bounded on the north by Paniqui; on the east by the Pura; on the south by the provincial capital Tarlac City; and on the west by Santa Ignacia. The town is 14 kilometres (8.7 mi) from Tarlac City the provincial capital, 72 kilometres (45 mi) from the regional center San Fernando, and 138 kilometres (86 mi) north of Metro Manila. The MacArthur Highway goes through the center of the town.

Gerona has a land area of 141.47 square kilometres (54.62 sq mi) of plain and rugged agricultural land representing 4.63% of the province total area. The Tarlac River, which originates from the eastern slopes of the Zambales Mountains, cuts across the west central areas, dividing the town into two parts.

The eastern area consists of 31 barangays with total land area of 90.50 square kilometres (34.94 sq mi) representing 63.9% of the total area. It is characterized as plain, low-lying agricultural land.

The second part is the Western Area consisting of 13 barangays with total area of 50.97 square kilometres (19.68 sq mi) representing 36.03% of the total land area. It is characterized by hilly and rugged agricultural land and is also forested.

=== Barangays ===
Gerona is politically subdivided into 44 barangays, as shown below. Each barangay consists of puroks and some have sitios.

- Abagon
- Amacalan
- Apsayan
- Ayson
- Bawa
- Buenlag
- Bularit
- Calayaan
- Carbonel
- Cardona
- Caturay
- Danzo
- Dicolor
- Don Basilio
- Luna
- Mabini
- Magaspac
- Malayep
- Matapitap
- Matayuncab
- New Salem
- Oloybuaya
- Padapada
- Parsolingan
- Pinasling (Pinasung)
- Plastado
- Poblacion 1
- Poblacion 2
- Poblacion 3
- Quezon
- Rizal
- Salapungan
- San Agustin
- San Antonio
- San Bartolome
- San Jose
- Santa Lucia
- Santiago
- Sembrano
- Singat
- Sulipa
- Tagumbao
- Tangcaran
- Villa Paz

=== Climate ===
Climate data for Gerona, Tarlac
Month	Jan	Feb	Mar	Apr	May	Jun	Jul	Aug	Sep	Oct	Nov	Dec	Year
Mean daily maximum °C (°F)	30 (86)	31 (88)	33 (91)	35 (95)	33 (91)	31 (88)	30 (86)	29 (84)	29 (84)	30 (86)	31 (88)	30 (86)	31 (88)
Mean daily minimum °C (°F)	19 (66)	19 (66)	20 (68)	22 (72)	24 (75)	24 (75)	24 (75)	24 (75)	23 (73)	22 (72)	21 (70)	20 (68)	22 (71)
Average precipitation mm (inches)	3 (0.1)	2 (0.1)	5 (0.2)	10 (0.4)	80 (3.1)	107 (4.2)	138 (5.4)	147 (5.8)	119 (4.7)	70 (2.8)	26 (1.0)	8 (0.3)	715 (28.1)
Average rainy days	2.0	1.7	2.7	4.6	16.1	20.8	24.0	23.0	21.4	15.5	8.0	3.2	143
Source: Meteoblue

== Demographics ==
Population census of Gerona

Year	Pop.	±% p.a.
1903	13,615	—
1918	14,809	+0.56%
1939	20,982	+1.67%
1948	26,763	+2.74%
1960	32,429	+1.61%
1970	41,831	+2.58%
1975	46,513	+2.15%
1980	50,433	+1.63%

Year	Pop.	±% p.a.
1990	59,486	+1.66%
1995	63,740	+1.30%
2000	72,618	+2.83%
2007	82,022	+1.69%
2010	83,084	+0.47%
2015	87,531	+1.00%
2020	94,485	+1.62%
2024	97,937	+0.87%

Source: Philippine Statistics Authority

In the 2024 census, the population of Gerona was 97,937 people, with a density of 760 inhabitants per square kilometre or 2,000 inhabitants per square mile.

== Economy ==
Poverty incidence of Gerona (%)

Source: Philippine Statistics Authority

== Tourism ==
=== Saint Catherine of Alexandria Church ===
It is located in Brgy. Poblacion, Vicariate of St. Catherine of Alexandria, Vicar Forane: Father Alfredo Dizon, Titular: Saint Catherine of Alexandria, Feast day, November 24 Parish Priest: Father Alfredo Dizon, succeeded by Fr. Ramon Capuno Parochial Vicar: Rev. Fr. Paulo Dela Cruz - Don Federico Bartolome Street, McArthur Highway, Gerona, Tarlac 2302, Philippines under the Roman Catholic Diocese of Tarlac Roman Catholic Diocese of Tarlac led by Most Rev. Florentino F. Cinense, D.D., PhD, STL.

== Education ==
There are two schools district offices which govern all educational institutions within the municipality. They oversee the management and operations of all private and public, from primary to secondary schools. There are Gerona North Schools District Office, and Gerona South Schools District Office.

=== Primary and elementary schools ===
- Abagon Elementary School
- Amacalan Elementary School
- Apsayan Elementary School
- Ayson Elementary School
- Bawa Elementary School
- Buenlag Elementary School
- Bularit Elementary School
- Carbonel Elementary School
- Cardona Elementary School
- Caturay Elementary School
- Dicolor Elementary School
- Danzo Elementary School
- Don Basilio Elementary School
- Gabaldon Elementary School
- Gerona Catholic School
- Gerona Ecumenical Christian School
- Gerona North Central Elementary School
- Holy Child School
- Luna Elementary School
- Mabini Elementary School
- Magaspac Elementary School
- Malayep Elementary School
- Marian School of Gerona
- Matapitap Elementary School
- Matayungcab Elementary School
- Mother Regina School
- New Salem Elementary School
- New Salem United Methodist Learning Center
- Oloybuaya Elementary School
- Padapada Primary School
- Parsolingan Elementary School
- Pinasling Elementary School
- Plastado Elementary School
- Quezon Elementary School
- Rizal Elementary School
- Rodrigo A. Fernando Memorial Adventist School
- Salapungan Elementary School
- San Antonio Elementary School
- San Bartolome Elementary School
- San Jose Elementary School
- Sembrano Elementary School
- Singat Elementary School
- Sta. Lucia Elementary School
- Sulipa Elementary School
- Tagumbao Elementary School
- Tangcaran Primary School
- Villa Paz Elementary School

=== Secondary schools ===
- Buenlag National High School
- Calayaan Integrated School
- Cardona National High School
- Corazon C. Aquino High School
- Gerona Western National High School
- Quezon National High School
- San Agustin Integrated School
- Santiago Integrated School
- Tagumbao National High School

=== Higher educational institutions ===
- Gerona Junior College
- Sacred Heart College of Science & Technology

== Gallery ==
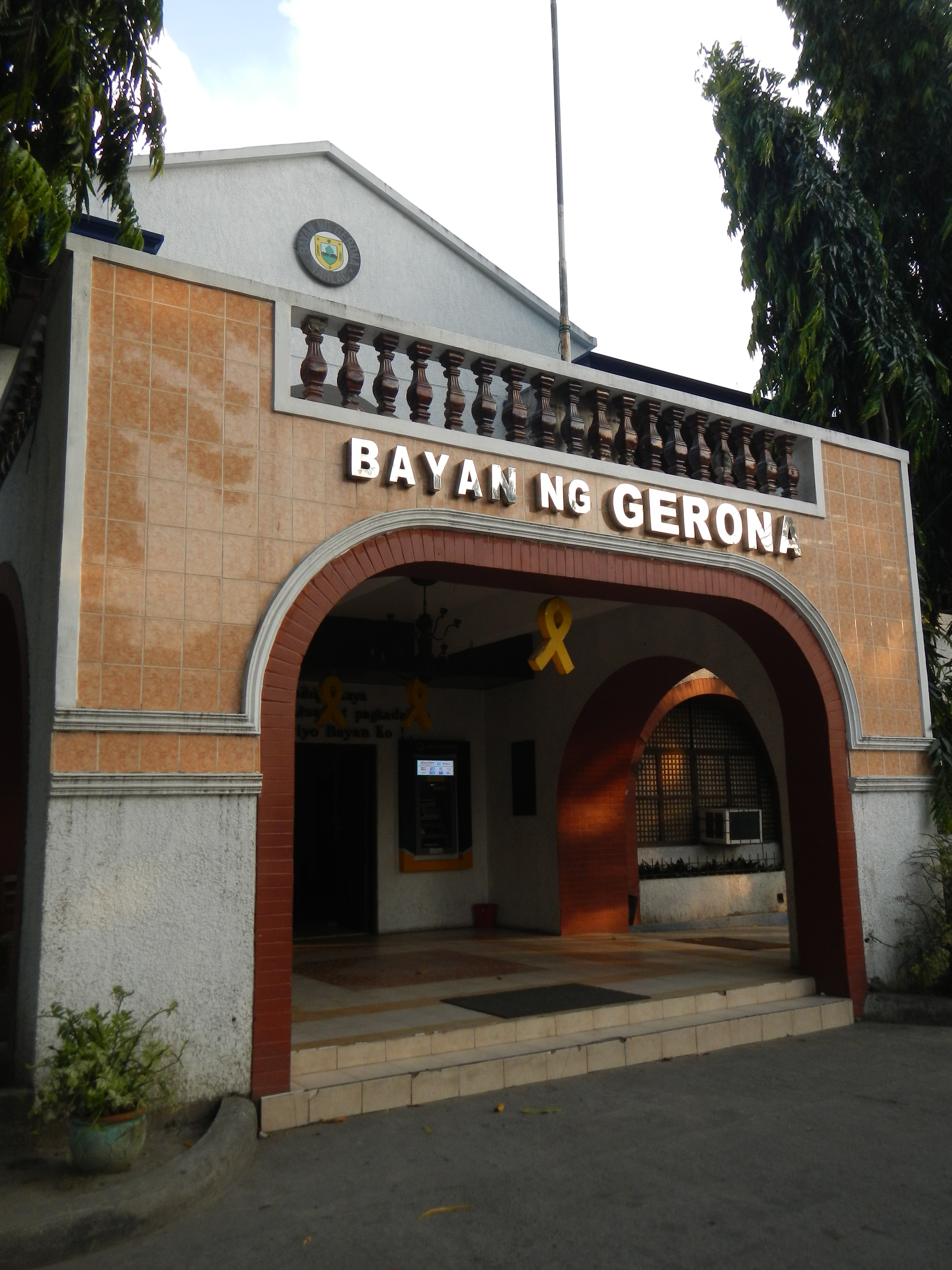
Town hall

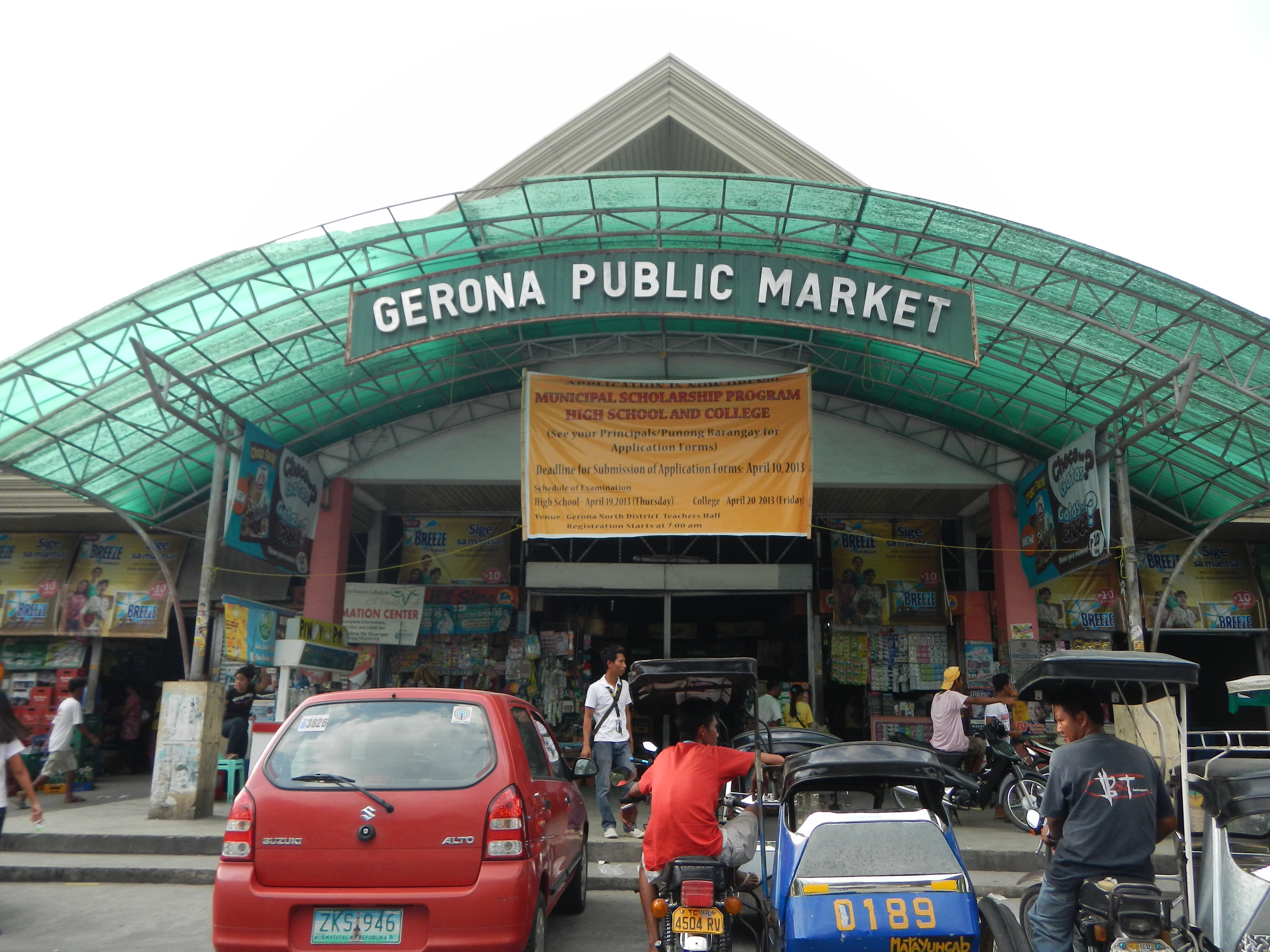
Public market

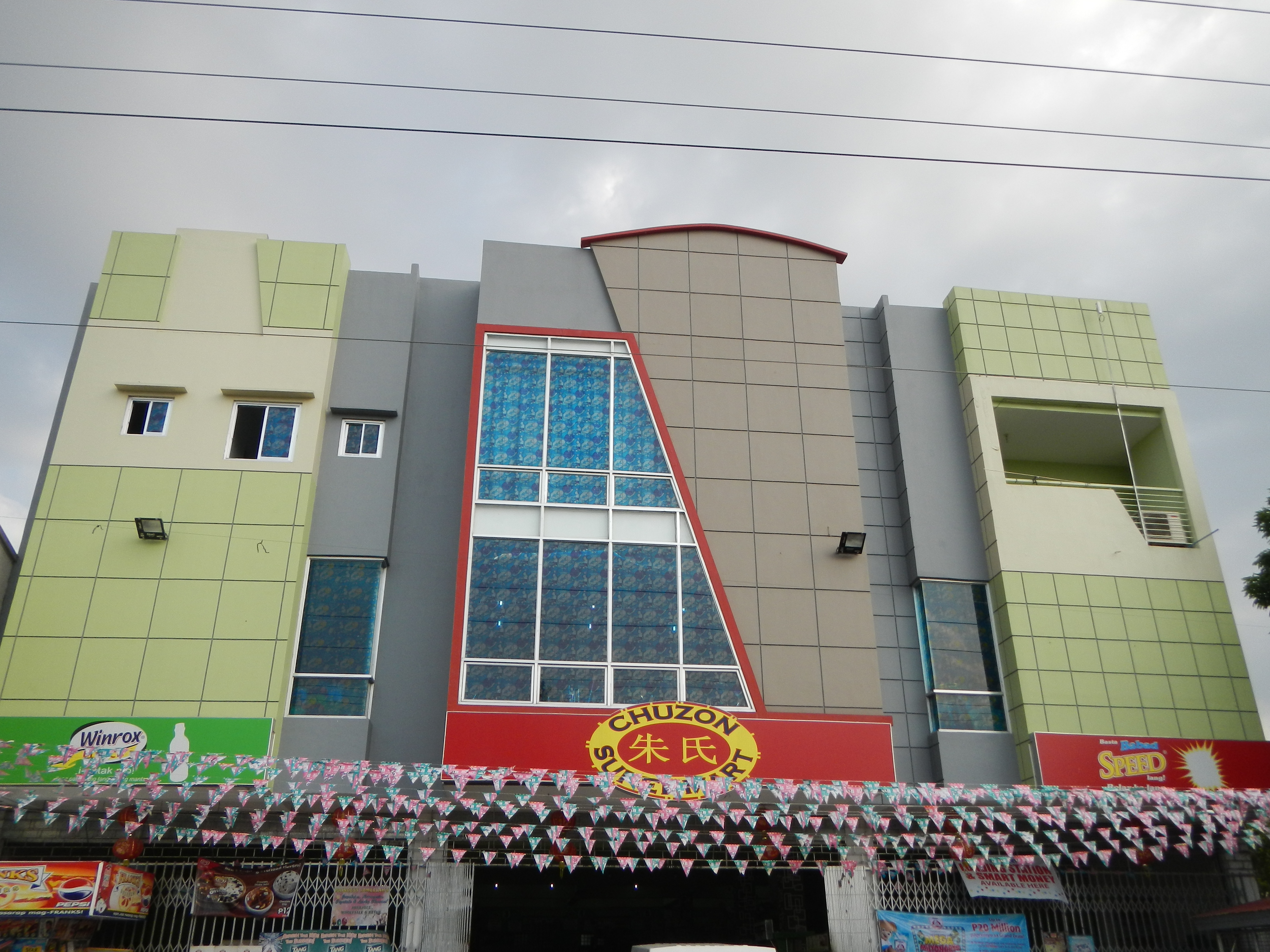
Chuzon Supermarket

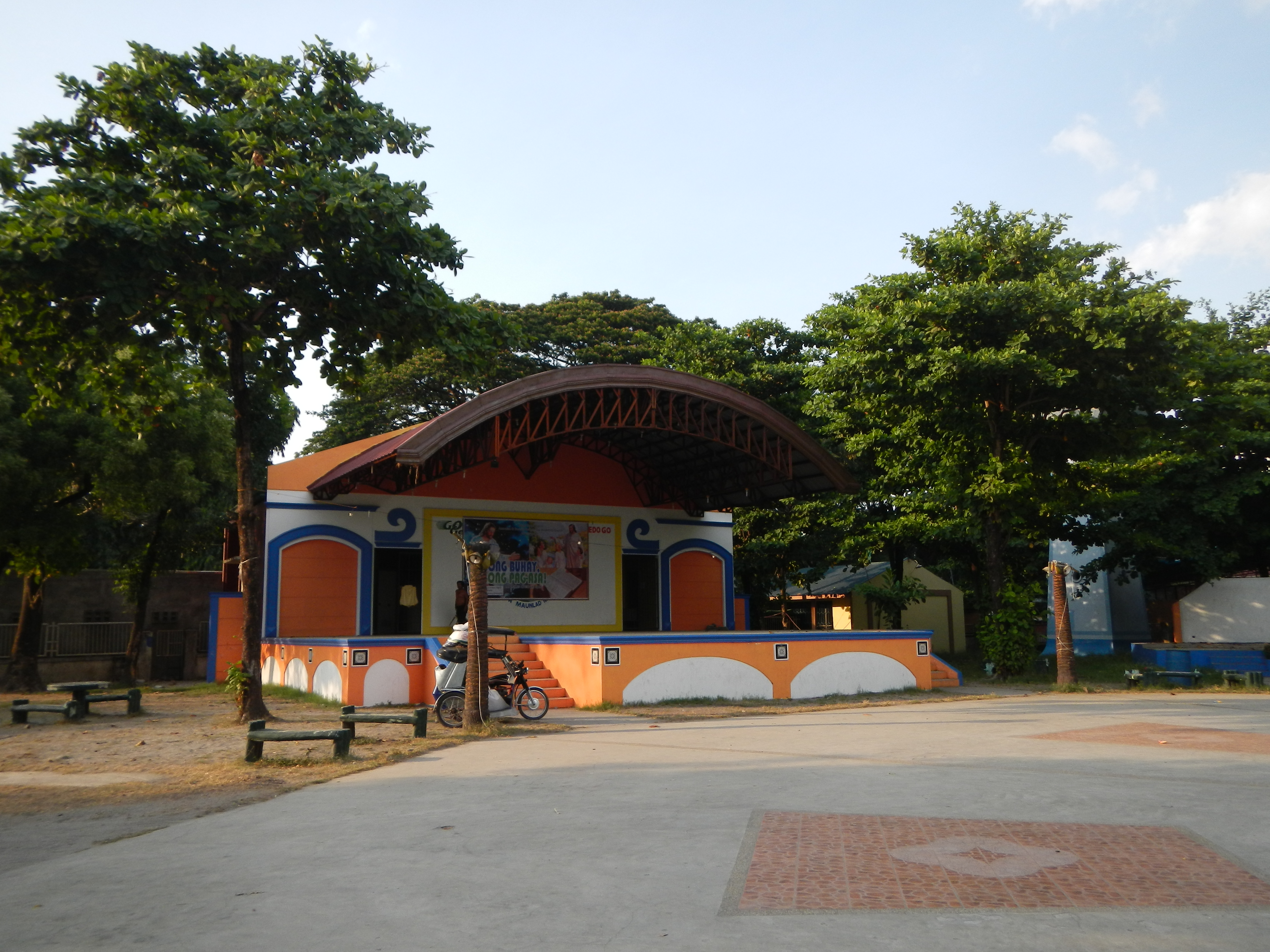
Auditorium

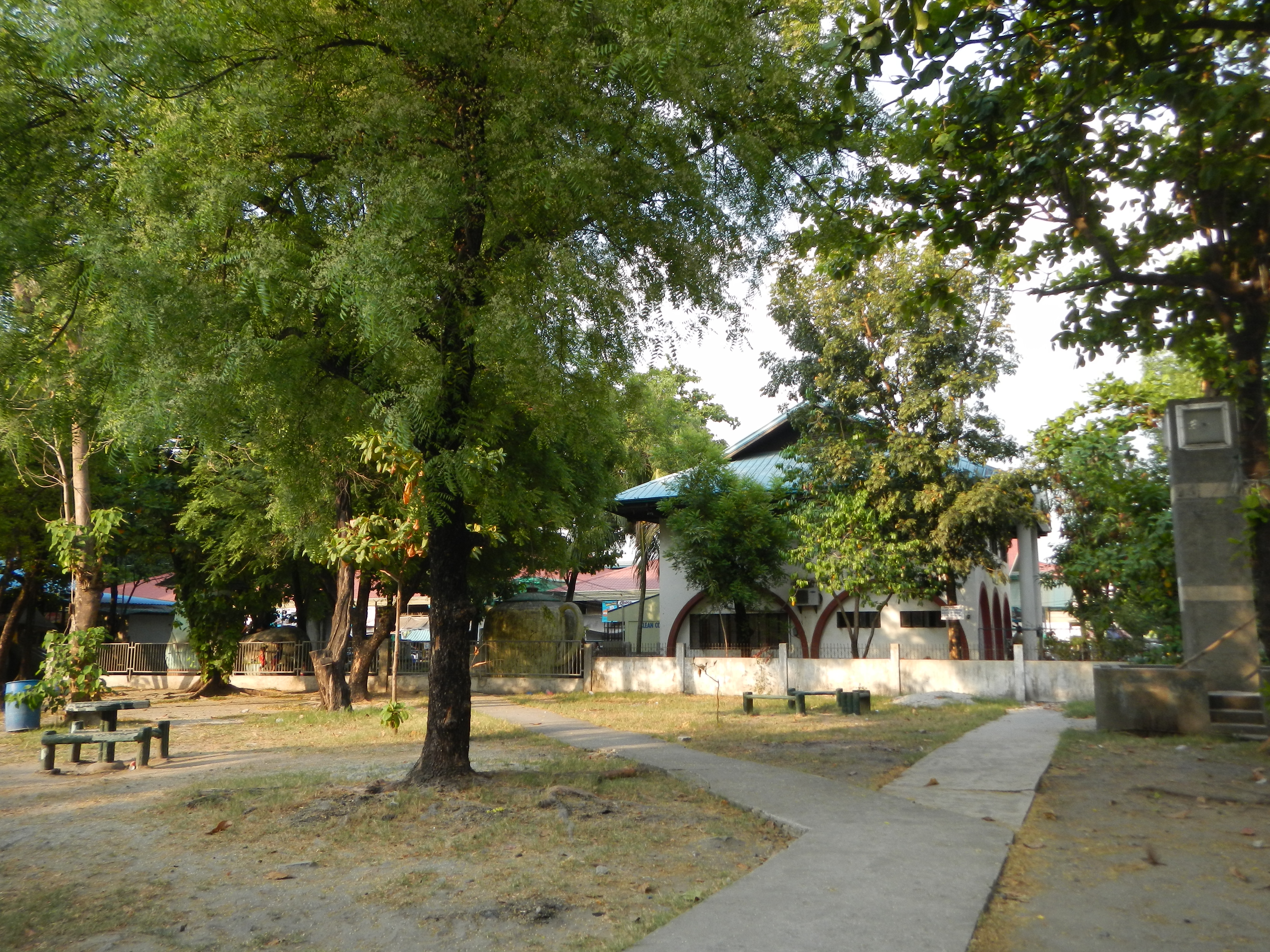
Park

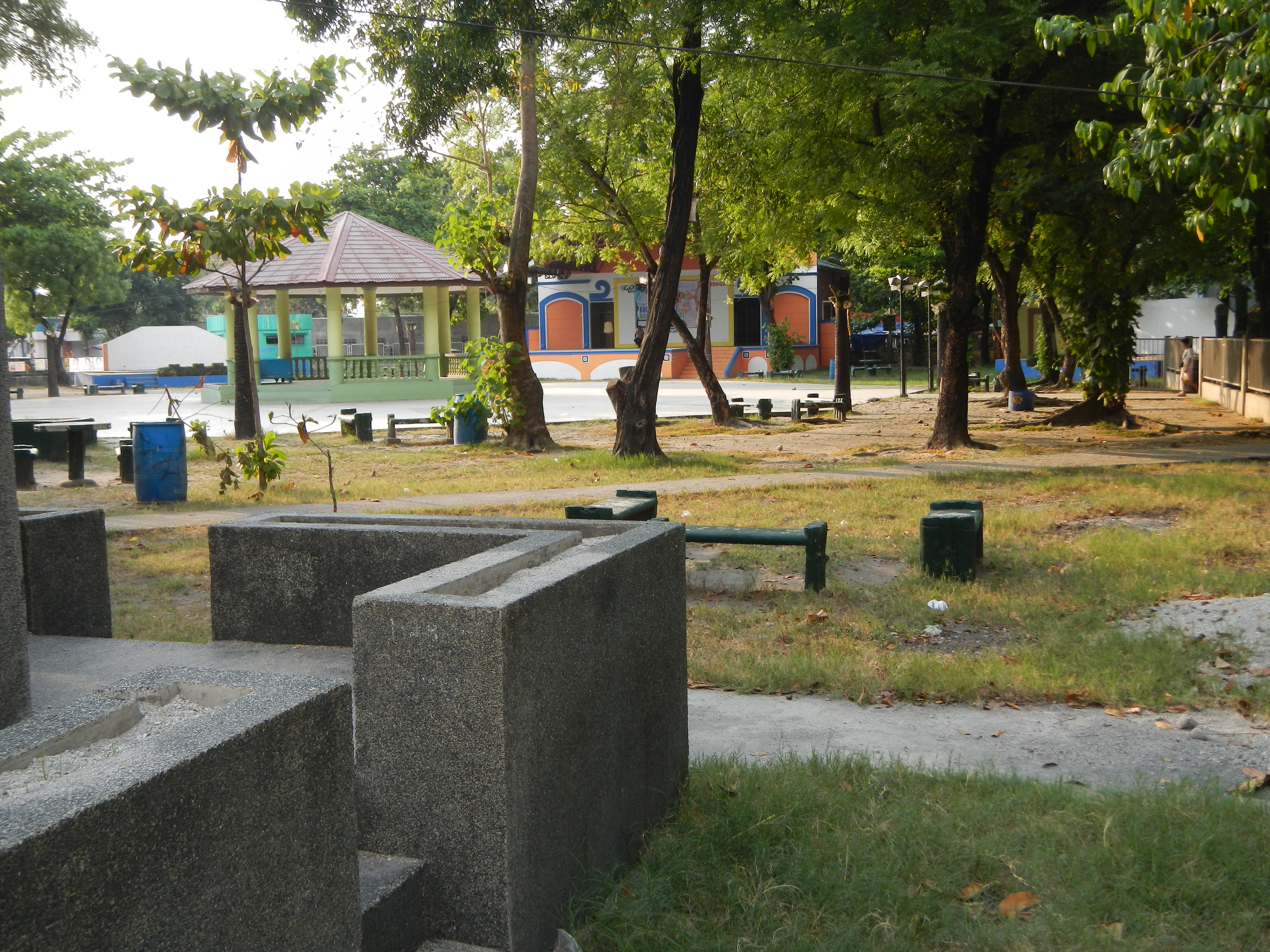
Plaza and park
