= Santa Ignacia =

Municipality in Tarlac, Philippines

Santa Ignacia Binaca
- Municipality
- Municipality of Santa Ignacia
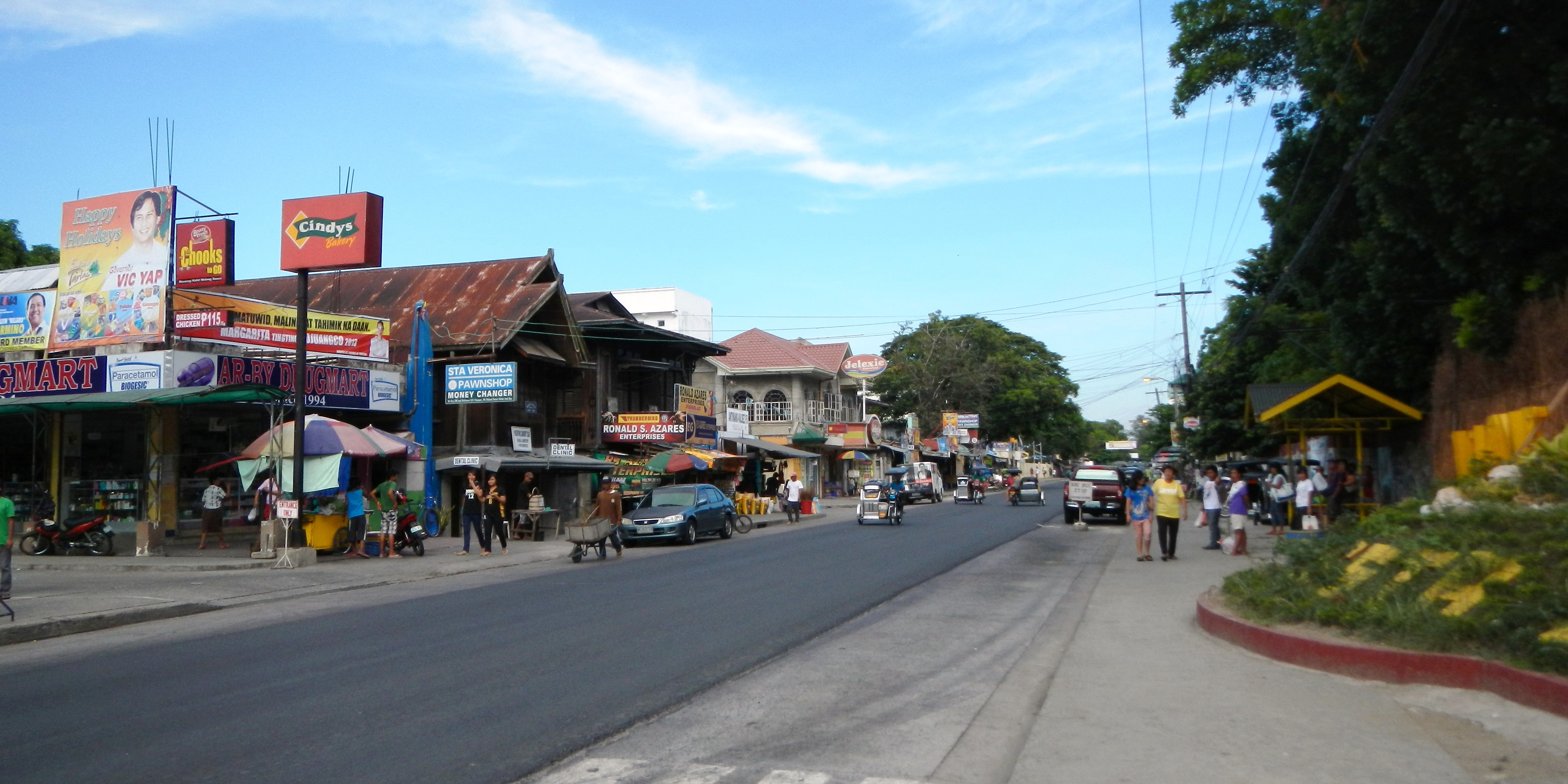
- Downtown area

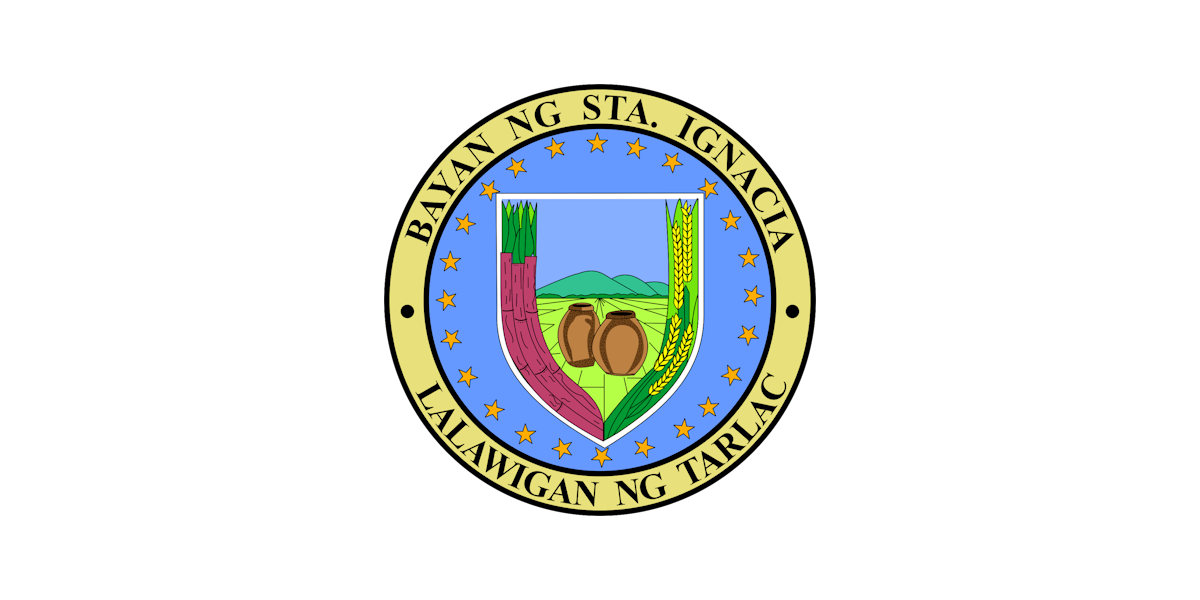
- Flag Seal
- Nickname: Nacia
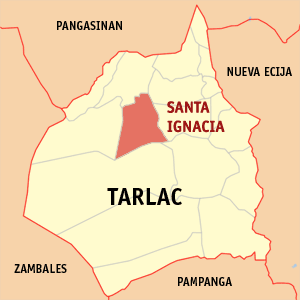
- Map of Tarlac with Santa Ignacia highlighted
- Interactive map of Santa Ignacia
- Location within the Philippines
- Coordinates: 15°37′N 120°26′E
- Country: Philippines
- Region: Central Luzon
- Province: Tarlac
- District: 1st district
- Named for: Ignacia del Espíritu Santo
- Barangays: 24 (see Barangays)

Government
  - Type: Sangguniang Bayan
  - Mayor: Nathaniel L. Tan
  - Vice Mayor: Francis Ponce G. Candelario
  - Representative: Jaime D. Cojuangco
  - Electorate: 32,826 voters (2025)

Area
  - Total: 146.07 km^{2} (56.40 sq mi)
- Elevation: 48 m (157 ft)
- Highest elevation: 115 m (377 ft)
- Lowest elevation: 21 m (69 ft)

Population (2024 census)
  - Total: 53,620
  - Density: 367.1/km^{2} (950.7/sq mi)
  - Households: 12,717

Economy
  - Income class: 1st municipal income class
  - Poverty incidence: 11.93% (2023)
  - Revenue: ₱ 348.8 million (2024)
  - Assets: ₱ 843.2 million (2024)
  - Expenditure: ₱ 226.2 million (2024)
  - Liabilities: ₱ 199.5 million (2024)

Service provider
  - Electricity: Tarlac 1 Electric Cooperative (TARELCO 1)
- Time zone: UTC+8 (PST)
- ZIP code: 2303
- PSGC: 0306915000
- IDD : area code: +63 (0)45
- Native languages: Pangasinan; Ilocano; Tagalog; Kapampangan
- Website: santaignaciatarlac.gov.ph

Santa Ignacia, officially the Municipality of Santa Ignacia (Pangasinan: Baley na Santa Ignacia; Ilocano: Ili ti Santa Ignacia; Tagalog: Bayan ng Santa Ignacia), is a municipality in the province of Tarlac, Philippines. According to the 2024 census, it has a population of 53,620 people.

== Etymology ==
The municipality is named after Venerable Mother Ignacia del Espíritu Santo, who founded the Religious of the Virgin Mary in 1684 as the first religious order open to native Filipinas. Despite the appellation "Santa" at the time of the town’s renaming for her, del Espíritu Santo has yet to be canonised a saint by the Catholic Church.

== Geography ==
Santa Ignacia is 26 kilometres (16 mi) from provincial capital Tarlac City, 150 kilometres (93 mi) from Manila, and 10 kilometres (6.2 mi) from Camiling.

Santa Ignacia has a total land area of 14,607 hectares (36,095 acres).

=== Barangays ===
Santa Ignacia is politically subdivided into 24 barangays, as shown below. Each barangay consists of puroks and some have sitios.

There are two barangays (highlighted in bold) which considered as urban while the rest of 22 barangays are rural.

- Baldios
- Botbotones
- Caanamongan
- Cabaruan
- Cabugbugan
- Caduldulaoan
- Calipayan
- Macaguing
- Nambalan
- Padapada
- Pilpila
- Pinpinas
- **Poblacion East**
- **Poblacion West**
- Pugo-Cecilio
- San Francisco
- San Sotero
- San Vicente
- Santa Ines Centro
- Santa Ines East
- Santa Ines West
- Taguiporo
- Timmaguab
- Vargas

=== Climate ===
Climate data for Santa Ignacia, Tarlac
Month	Jan	Feb	Mar	Apr	May	Jun	Jul	Aug	Sep	Oct	Nov	Dec	Year
Mean daily maximum °C (°F)	30 (86)	31 (88)	33 (91)	35 (95)	33 (91)	31 (88)	30 (86)	29 (84)	29 (84)	30 (86)	31 (88)	30 (86)	31 (88)
Mean daily minimum °C (°F)	19 (66)	19 (66)	20 (68)	22 (72)	24 (75)	24 (75)	24 (75)	24 (75)	23 (73)	22 (72)	21 (70)	20 (68)	22 (71)
Average precipitation mm (inches)	3 (0.1)	2 (0.1)	5 (0.2)	10 (0.4)	80 (3.1)	107 (4.2)	138 (5.4)	147 (5.8)	119 (4.7)	70 (2.8)	26 (1.0)	8 (0.3)	715 (28.1)
Average rainy days	2.0	1.7	2.7	4.6	16.1	20.8	24.0	23.0	21.4	15.5	8.0	3.2	143
Source: Meteoblue

== Demographics ==
Population census of Santa Ignacia
Year	Pop.	±% p.a.
1903	1,911	—
1918	5,382	+7.15%
1939	10,993	+3.46%
1948	14,061	+2.77%
1960	15,512	+0.82%
1970	20,775	+2.96%
1975	23,157	+2.20%
1980	25,224	+1.72%
1990	30,470	+1.91%
1995	34,658	+2.44%
2000	38,301	+2.17%
2007	43,560	+1.79%
2010	43,787	+0.19%
2015	47,538	+1.58%
2020	51,626	+1.75%
2024	53,620	+0.91%
Source: Philippine Statistics Authority

In the 2020 census, the population of Santa Ignacia, Tarlac, was 51,626 people, with a density of 350 inhabitants per square kilometre or 910 inhabitants per square mile.

== Economy ==
Poverty incidence of Santa Ignacia (%)

Source: Philippine Statistics Authority

== Education ==
The Santa Ignacia Schools District Office governs all educational institutions within the municipality. It oversees the management and operations of all private and public, from primary to secondary schools.

=== Primary and elementary schools ===
- Accelerated Learning Academy
- Botbotones Elementary School
- Caanamongan Elementary School
- Cabugbugan Elementary School
- Caduldulaoan Elementary School
- Calipayan Elementary School
- Don Bonifacio Alviar Elementary School
- Macaguing Primary School
- Nambalan Elementary School
- Padapada United Methodist Church Learning Center
- Pilpila Elementary School
- Pinpinas Elementary School
- Pugo Cecilio Elementary School
- San Francisco Elementary School
- San Sotero Elementary School
- San Vicente Elementary School
- Schola Christi Montessori
- SIBC Christian Academy
- Siena Montessori School
- Sta. Ignacia Academy
- Sta. Ignacia Catholic School
- Sta. Ignacia Educational Institution
- Sta. Ignacia North Central School
- Sta. Ignacia South Cemtral Elementary School
- Sta. Ignacia United Methodist Church Learning Center
- Sta. Ines Central Elementary School
- Sta. Ines East Elementary School
- Sta. Ines West Elementary School
- Sta. Ines West Primary School (Annex)
- Taguiporo-Cabaruan Elementary School
- Timmaguab Elementary School
- Vargas Elementary School

=== Secondary schools ===
- Caanamongan High School
- Calipayan National High School
- Nambalan National High School
- Padapada National High School
- Pilpila High School
- Sacata National High School
- Sta. Ignacia Academy
- Sta. Ignacia High School
- Sta. Ignacia National High School
- Sta. Ines National High School
- Vargas High School

=== Higher educational institution ===
- Glory Dei Montessori College

== Gallery ==
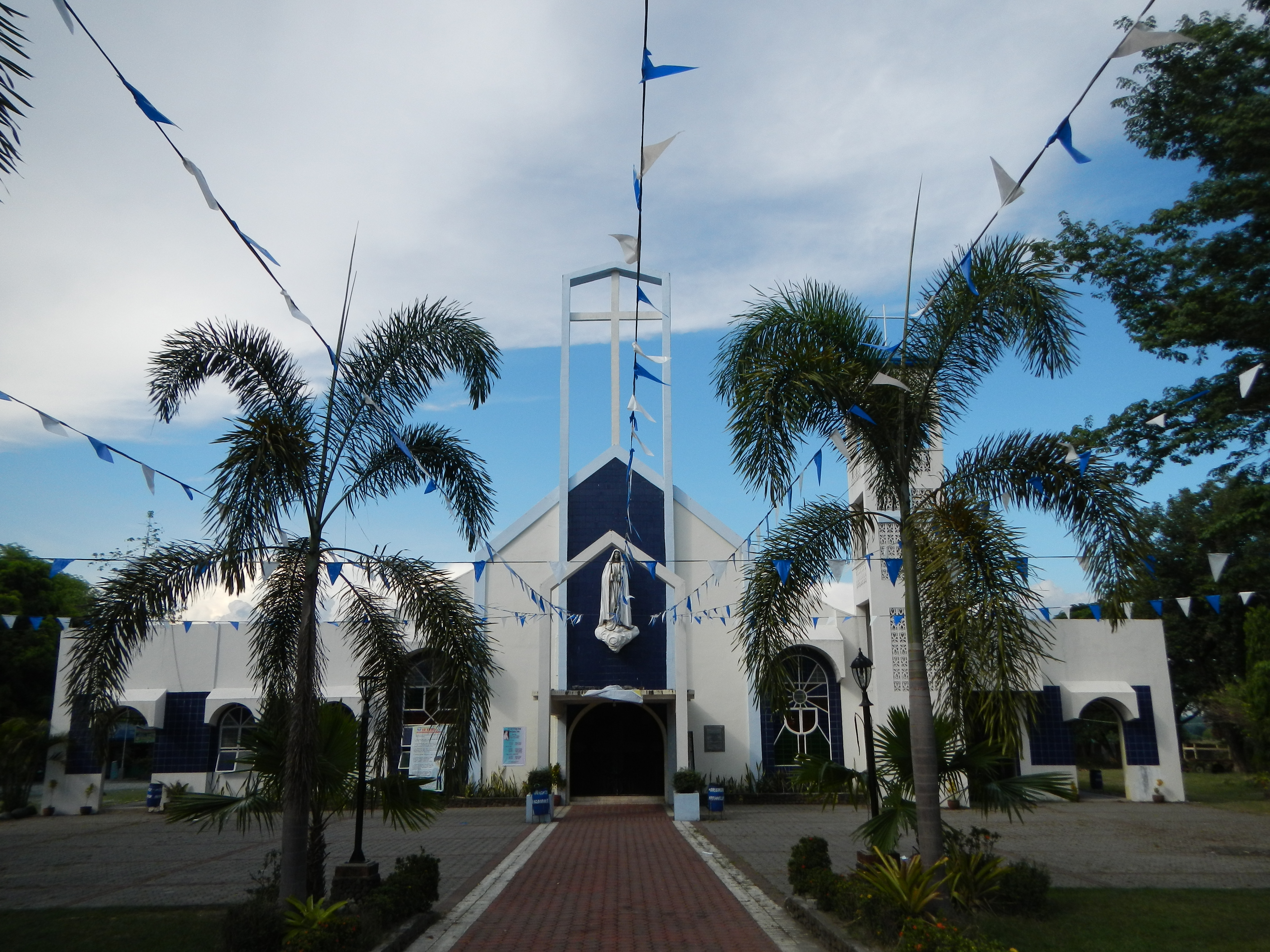
Our Lady of Fatima Parish Church of Santa Ignacia

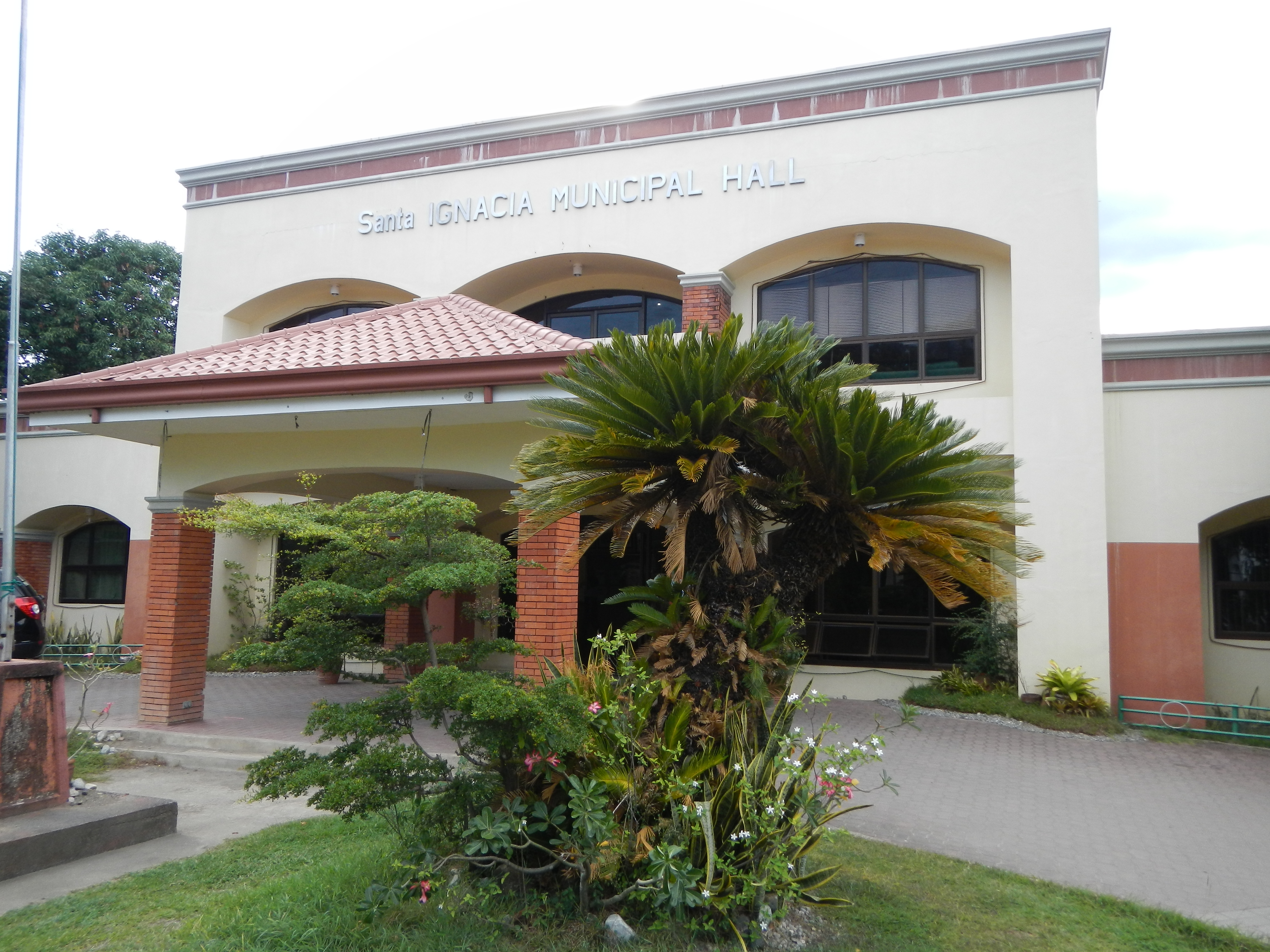
Town hall

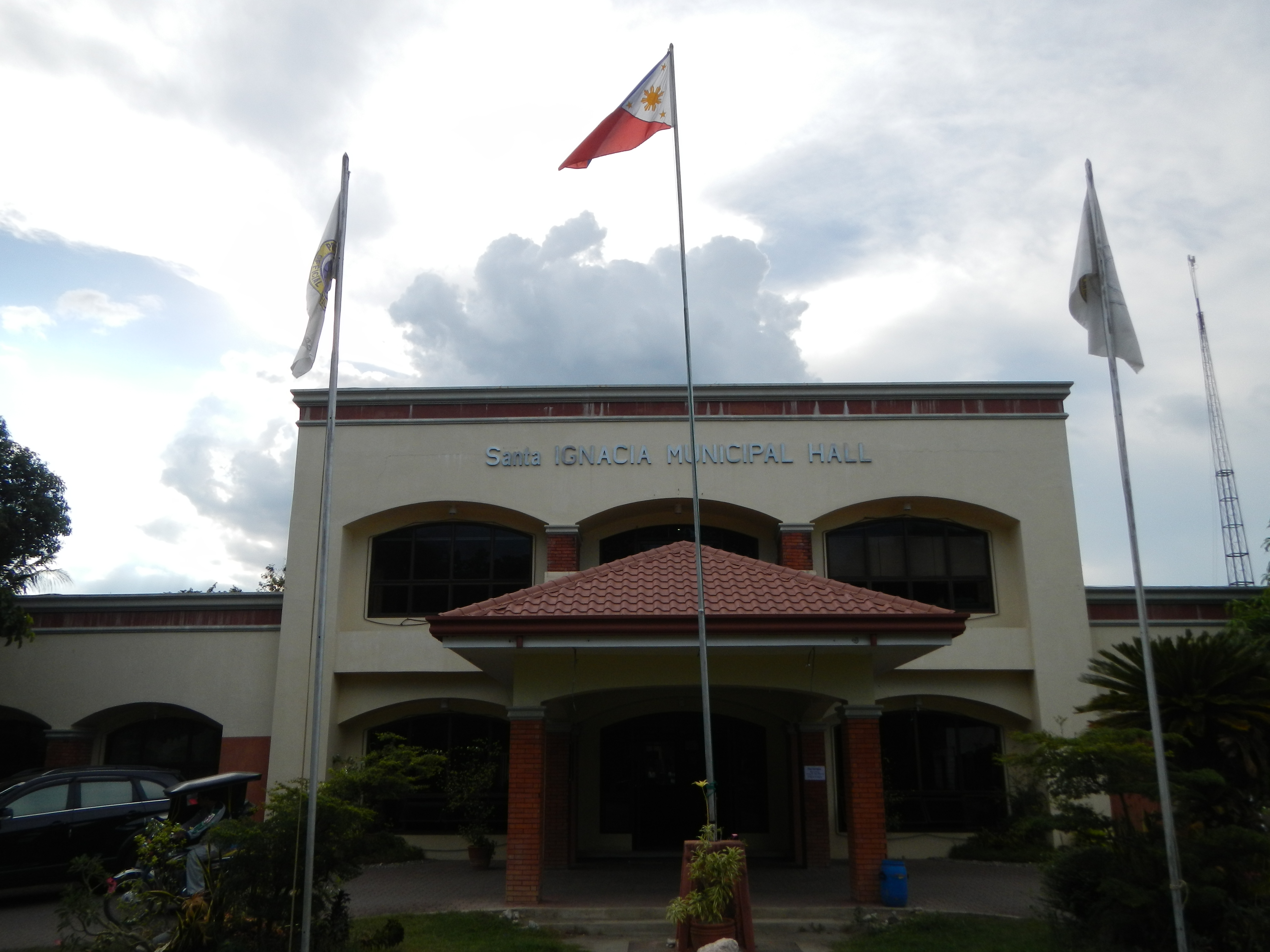
Town hall
