= Luzon =

Island in the Philippines

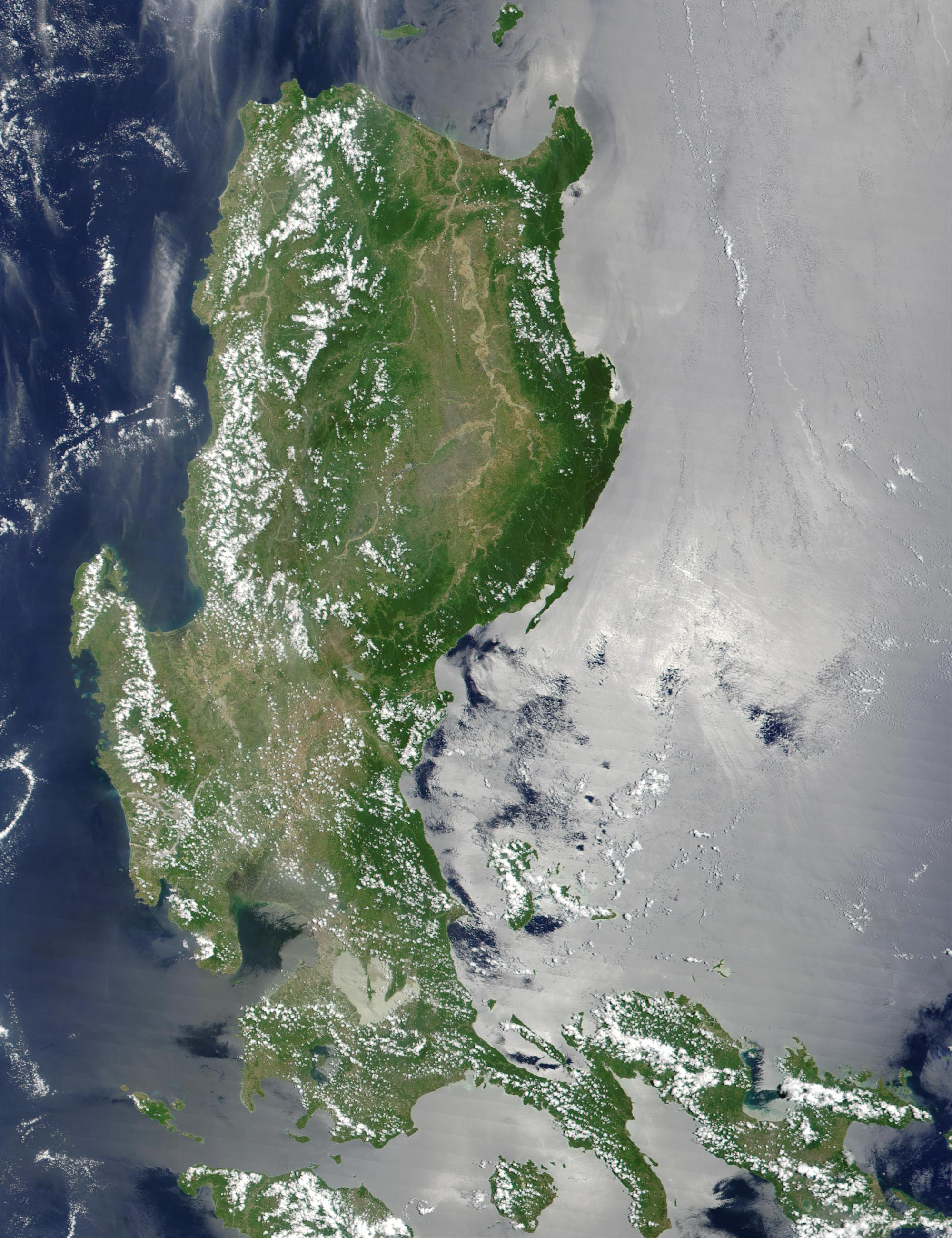
- Satellite image of the area in 2005
- Interactive map of Luzon

Geography
- Location: Southeast Asia
- Coordinates: 16°N 121°E
- Archipelago: Philippines
- Adjacent to: Babuyan Channel; Burias Pass; Philippine Sea; Polillo Strait; Samar Sea; San Bernardino Strait; Sibuyan Sea; South China Sea; Ticao Pass; Verde Island Passage
- Major islands: Luzon; Mindoro; Palawan; Masbate; Catanduanes; Busuanga; Marinduque; Romblon; Polillo; Burias; Ticao; Alabat; Sibuyan; Tablas; Culion; Balabac; Bugsuk; Dumaran
- Area: 109,965 km^{2} (42,458 sq mi)
- Area rank: 15th
- Coastline: 3,249.6 km (2019.21 mi)
- Highest elevation: 2,928 m (9606 ft)
- Highest point: Mount Pulag

Administration
- Philippines
- Regions: List: Region 1 – Ilocos Region; Region 2 – Cagayan Valley; Region 3 – Central Luzon; Region 4A – Calabarzon; Region 4B – Mimaropa; Region 5 – Bicol Region; CAR – Cordillera Administrative Region; NCR – National Capital Region
- Provinces: List: Abra; Albay; Apayao; Aurora; Bataan; Batangas; Benguet; Bulacan; Cagayan; Camarines Norte; Camarines Sur; Cavite; Ifugao; Ilocos Norte; Ilocos Sur; Isabela; Kalinga; La Union; Laguna; Mountain Province; Nueva Ecija; Nueva Vizcaya; Pampanga; Pangasinan; Quezon; Quirino; Rizal; Sorsogon; Tarlac; Zambales; Outlying island provinces: Batanes; Catanduanes; Marinduque; Masbate; Occidental Mindoro; Oriental Mindoro; Palawan; Romblon
- Largest settlement: Quezon City (pop. 3,084,270)

Demographics
- Demonym: Luzonian (modern); Luzonense (occasional); Luções/Luzones (archaic)
- Population: 64,301,558 (2024) (census)
- Pop. density: 585/km^{2} (1515/sq mi)
- Ethnic groups: Aeta; Bicolano; Bolinao; Gaddang; Ibanag; Igorot; Bontoc; Ibaloi; Ifugao; Isneg; Itneg; Kalinga; Kankanaey; Kalanguya; Ilokano; Ilongot; Itawes; Ivatan; Kapampangan; Pangasinan; Sambal; Tagalog

Luzon (/luːˈzɒn/ loo-ZON, Tagalog: [luˈson]) is the largest and most populous island in the Philippines. Located in the northern portion of the Philippine archipelago, it is the economic and political center of the nation. The country's capital city, Manila, as well as Quezon City, the country's most populous city, are located on the island of Luzon. Luzon has a population of 64.3 million as of 2024; this constitutes more than half of the total population of the Philippines. Luzon is the 4th most populous island in the world. It is the 15th largest island in the world by area of land.

Luzon may also refer to one of the three primary island groups in the country. In this usage, it includes the Luzon Mainland, the Batanes and Babuyan groups of islands to the north, Polillo Islands to the east, and the outlying islands of Catanduanes, Marinduque and Mindoro, among others, to the south. The islands and provinces of Masbate, Palawan and Romblon are also included, although these three are sometimes grouped with another of the island groups, the Visayas.

== Etymology ==
The name Luzon is thought to derive from ᜎᜓᜐᜓᜅ᜔ lusong, a Tagalog word referring to a particular kind of large wooden mortar used in dehusking rice. A 2008 research paper by Eulito Bautista and Evelyn Javier provides an image of a lusong, explaining:

Traditional milling was accomplished in the 1900s by pounding the palay with a wooden pestle in a stone or wooden mortar called lusong. The first pounding takes off the hull and further pounding removes the bran but also breaks most grains. Further winnowing with a bamboo tray (bilao) separates the hull from the rice grains. This traditional hand-pounding chore, although very laborious and resulted in a lot of broken rice, required two to three skilled men and women to work harmoniously and was actually a form of socializing among young folks in the villages.

In old Latin, Italian, Spanish, and Portuguese maps, the island is often called Luçon, Luçonia or Luconia.

Luções, [luˈsõjʃ] (also Luzones in Spanish) was a demonym used by Portuguese sailors in Malaysia during the early 1500s, referring to the Kapampangan and Tagalog people who lived in Manila Bay, which was then called Lusong (Kapampangan: Lusung, Spanish/Portuguese: Luçon), from which Luzon was also derived. The term was also used for Tagalog settlers in Southern Tagalog region, where they created intensive contact with the Kapampangans. Eventually, the term "Luzones" would refer to the settlers of Luzon island, and later on, would be exclusive to the peoples of Central Luzon.

== History ==
=== Before European colonization ===
Homo luzonensis fossils, found in Callao Cave on Luzon, represent a newly identified extinct archaic human species from at least 50,000 to 67,000 years ago.

Before 1000 CE, the Tagalog, Kapampangan, and Pangasinan peoples of south and central Luzon had established several major coastal polities, notably Maynila, Tondo and Namayan. The oldest known Philippine document, written in 900, is the Laguna Copperplate Inscription, which names places in and around Manila Bay and also mentions Medan, a place in Indonesia. These coastal Philippine kingdoms were thalassocracies, based on trade with neighboring Asian political entities and structured by leases between chiefs or lords (Datu) and paramount lords (Lakan) or Rajahs, by whom tributes were extracted and taxes were levied. These kingdoms were under the competing influence of Hinduism, Animism, or Islam. Before that, from 2500 - 2000 BCE, Kapampangans along with Sambal people and Hatang Kayi settled south Luzon; subsequently, from 1200 - 1000 BCE, the migrating Tagalog settlers from eastern Visayas or northeast Mindanao stayed in south Luzon and they made contact with the Kapampangans, Sambal people and the Hatang Kayi, of which contact with the Kapampangans was most intensive; after this, the original settlers moved northward: Kapampangans moved to modern Tondo, Navotas, and Central Luzon (modern Bulacan, Nueva Ecija, Aurora, Pampanga, south Tarlac, and east Bataan), and Sambals to the modern province of Zambales, in turn, displacing the Aetas.

There was also a Buddhist polity known as Ma-i or Maidh, described in Chinese and Bruneian records in the 10th century, although its location is still unknown and scholars are divided on whether it is in modern-day Bay, Laguna or Bulalacao, Mindoro.

According to sources at the time, the trade in large native Ruson-tsukuri (Japanese: 呂宋製), literally Luzon-made clay jars used for storing green tea and rice wine with Japan flourished in the 12th century, and local Tagalog, Kapampangan and Pangasinan potters had marked each jar with Baybayin letters denoting the particular urn used and the kiln the jars were manufactured in. Certain kilns were renowned over others; prices depended on the reputation of the kiln. Of this flourishing trade, the Burnay jars of Ilocos are the only large clay jar manufactured in Luzon today with origins from this time.

In the early 1300s the Chinese annals, Nanhai zhi, reported that Hindu Brunei invaded or administered Sarawak and Sabah as well as the Philippine kingdoms of Butuan, Sulu, and in Luzon: Ma-i (Mindoro) and Malilu 麻裏蘆 (present-day Manila); Shahuchong 沙胡重 (present-day Siocon or Zamboanga), Yachen 啞陳 Oton (Part of the Madja-as Kedatuan), and 文杜陵 Wenduling (present-day Mindanao), which would regain their independence at a later date.

In 1405, the Yongle Emperor appointed a Chinese governor of Luzon, Ko Ch'a-lao, during Zheng He's voyages. China also had vassals among the leaders in the archipelago. China attained ascendancy in trade with the area in Yongle's reign.

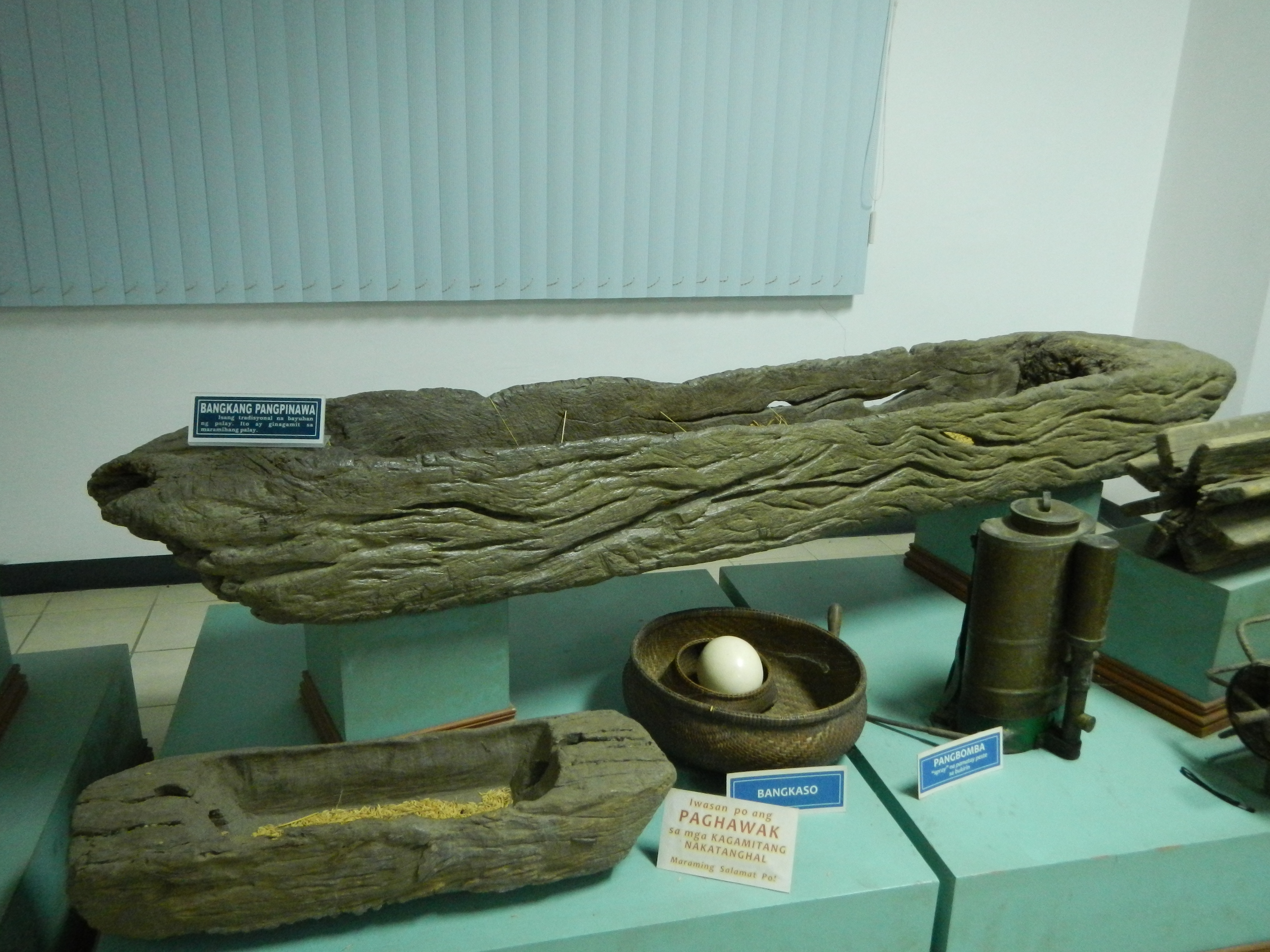
Bangkang pinawa, an ancient Philippine mortar and pestle

Afterwards, some parts of Luzon were Islamized when the former Majapahit province of Poni broke free, converted to Islam, and imported Sharif Ali, a prince from Mecca who became the Sultan of Brunei, a nation that then expanded its realms from Borneo to the Philippines and set up the Kingdom of Maynila as its puppet-state. The invasion of Brunei spread Chinese royal descent like Ong Sum Ping's kin and Arab dynasties too into the Philippines like the clan of Sultan Sharif Ali. However, other Luzon kingdoms resisted Islam, like Pangasinan. It had remained a tributary state of China and was a largely Sinified kingdom, which maintained trade with Japan. The Polity of Cainta also existed as a fortified city-state, armed with walls and cannons. As written in the book of Dong-Xiyang kao (Chinese: 東西洋考), the Chinese Ming dynasty recorded that there was a "Kingdom of Luzon" that existed over the current island of Luzon.

=== Interactions with the Portuguese ===
The Portuguese were the first European explorers who recorded it in their charts as Luçonia or Luçon, calling the inhabitants Luções. Edmund Roberts, who visited Luzon in the early 19th century, wrote that Luzon was "discovered" in 1521. The Portuguese encountered Luzones, people from Luzon, as far away as the Malabar Coast in the Western part of India at South Asia serving as naval and mercenary muscle for the Portuguese armada in the wars against local Muslim kingdoms.

Portuguese and Spanish accounts from the early to mid 1500s state that the Kingdom of Maynila was the same as the Kingdom of Luzon that was mentioned in Ming Dynasty Records (from the Tagalog or Malay name Lusong and Kapampangan name Lusung), and whose citizens had been called "Luções".

Many people from Luzon were employed within Portuguese Malacca. For example, the spice magnate Regimo de Raja, based in Malacca, was highly influential and was appointed as Temenggong (Sea Lord)—a governor and chief general responsible for overseeing of maritime trade—by the Portuguese. As Temenggong, de Raja was also the head of an armada which traded and protected commerce in the Indian Ocean, the Strait of Malacca, the South China Sea, and the medieval maritime principalities of the Philippines. His father and wife carried on his maritime trading business after his death. Another important Malacca trader was Curia de Raja who also hailed from Luzon. The "surname" of "de Raja" or "diraja" could indicate that Regimo and Curia, and their families, were of noble or royal descent as the term is an abbreviation of Sanskrit adiraja.

Fernão Mendes Pinto noted that a number of Luções in the Islamic fleets went to battle with the Portuguese in the Philippines during the 16th century. The Sultan of Aceh gave one of them (Sapetu Diraja) the task of holding Aru (northeast Sumatra) in 1540. Pinto also says one was named leader of the Malays remaining in the Moluccas Islands after the Portuguese conquest in 1511. Antonio Pigafetta notes that one of them was in command of the Brunei fleet in 1521. However, the Luções did not only fight on the side of the Muslims. Pinto says they were also apparently among the natives of the Philippines who fought the Muslims in 1538.

On Mainland Southeast Asia, Lusung/Luções warriors aided the Burmese king in his invasion of Siam in 1547. At the same time, Lusong warriors fought alongside the Siamese king and faced the same elephant army of the Burmese king in the defence of the Siamese capital at Ayutthaya. The Luções were so successful in Siam that the Thai king rewarded them by having them ennobled and granted them land. Luções military and trade activity reached as far as Sri Lanka in South Asia where Lungshanoid pottery made in Luzon were discovered in burials. Meanwhile in the nearby Sultanate of Aceh the Luções fighting men so impressed the Sultan, that they were assigned to become the Sultan's royal guard and to be assigned as the Sultan's royal guard, is proof of Luçoes men's physical strength, martial prowess, and masculine attractiveness; as during that time period, among medieval kingdoms, that office was delegated only to the most strong, intelligent, handsome, attractive, virile, aristocratic, and combat-worthy, of warriors.

Scholars have thus suggested that they could be mercenaries valued by all sides.

=== Spanish Colonial Era ===
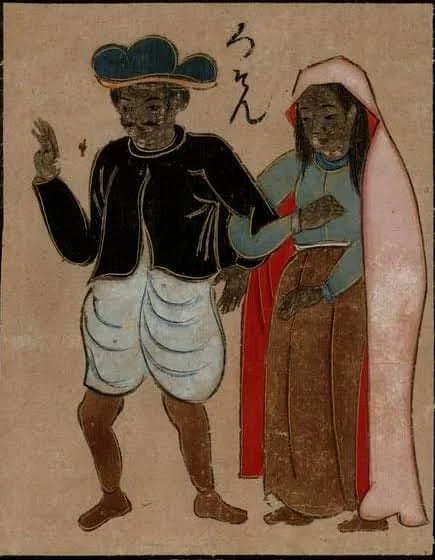
Japanese depiction of Luzones in 1671.

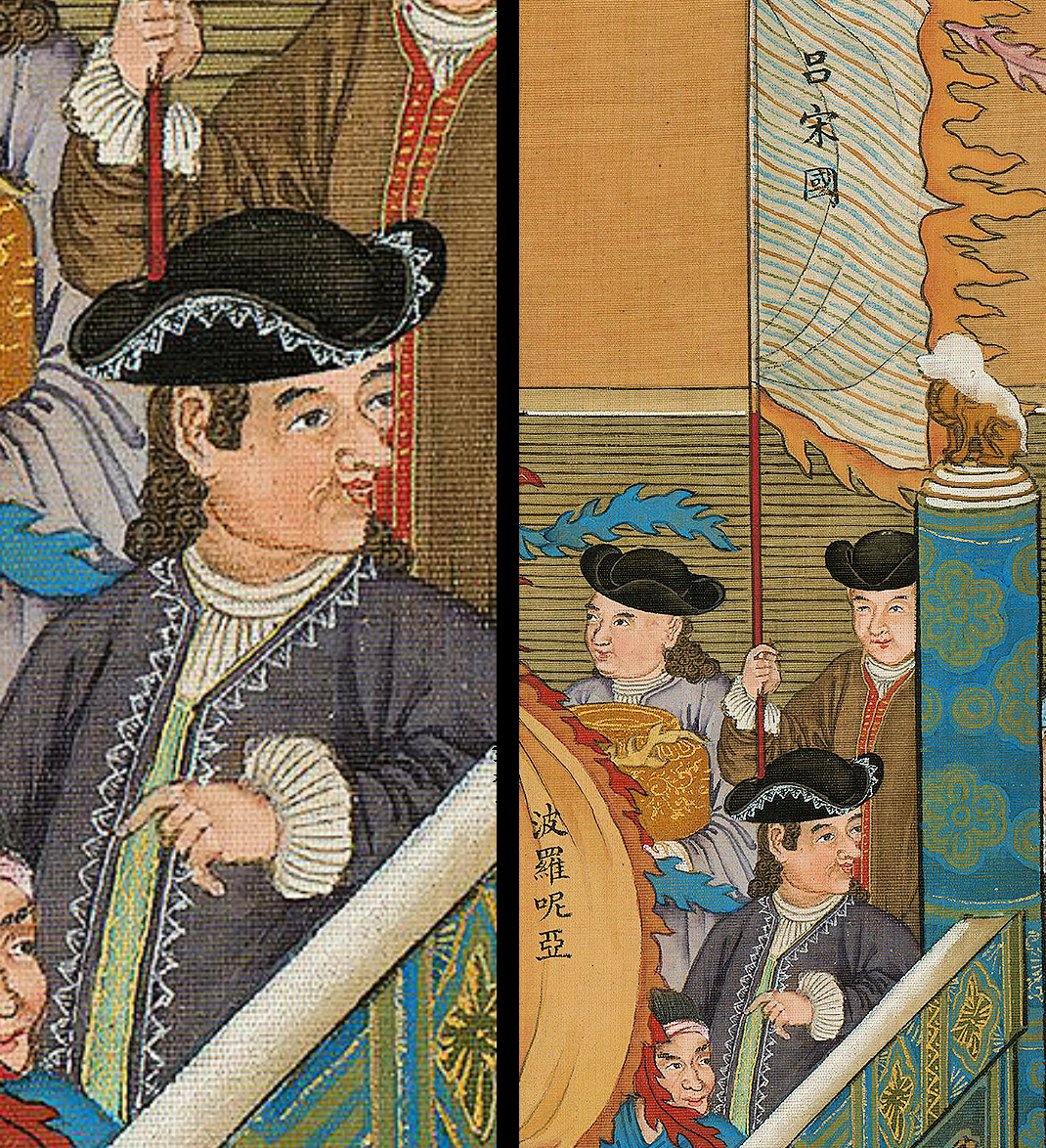
Luzon island (吕宋国) delegates in Beijing, China, in Wànguó láicháo tú, 1761

In 1569, a Spanish expedition dispatched by Miguel Lopez de Legazpi led by Luis Enriquez de Guzman and Augustinian friar Alonso Jimenez first set foot in Albay. They arrived on the coastal settlement called Ibalon in present-day Magallanes, Sorsogon after exploring the islands of Masbate, Ticao and Burias and proceeded inland as far as present-day Camalig, Albay. The Spanish arrival in the 16th century saw the incorporation of the Luções people and the breaking up of their kingdoms and the establishment of the Las Islas Filipinas with its capital Cebu, which was moved to Manila following the defeat of the local Rajah Sulayman in 1570. Martín de Goiti, having been dispatched by Legazpi to Luzon, conquered Maynila. Legazpi followed with a larger fleet comprising both Spanish and a majority Visayan force, taking a month to bring these forces to bear due to slow speed of local ships. This large force caused the surrender of neighboring Tondo. An attempt by some local leaders, known as the Tondo Conspiracy, to defeat the Spanish was repelled. Soon, the Spanish and Mexican conquistadors from Mexico were given encomiendas over several parts of Luzon. They are the following: Antonio de Carvajal, held an encomienda in early Luzon settlements; no exact figures preserved. Juan de Morón, early encomendero; tributary numbers not specified. Francisco de Herrera, received an encomienda in Luzon; details incomplete. and Pedro de Chaves, Luzon Encomienda holder; tribute count unknown.

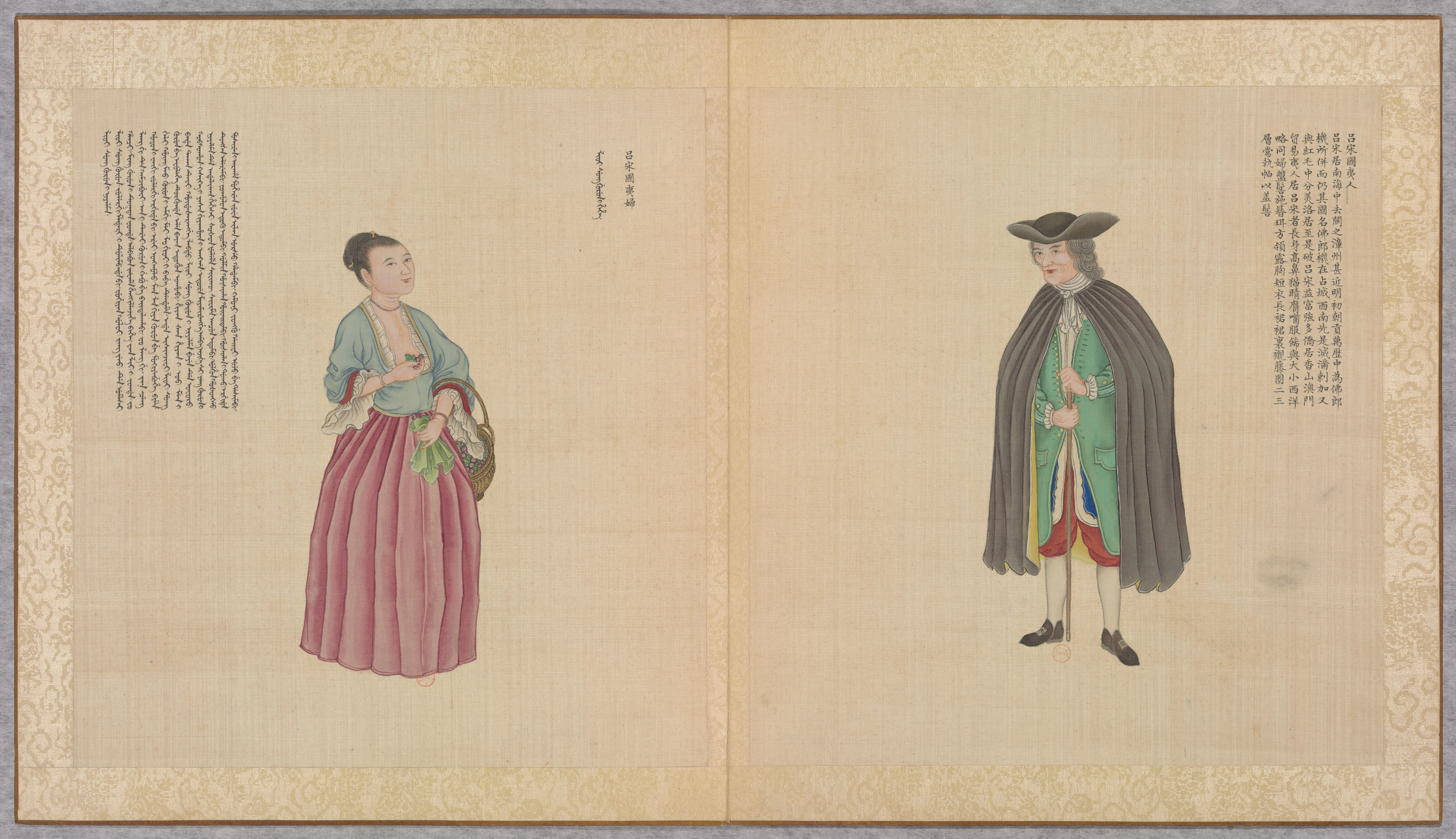
Depiction of the Luzon people in 1700s from the Chinese book Huang Qing Zhigong Tu. The Chinese called them Lu Song whom they recognized as a prosperous and powerful "kingdom" under the Spanish Empire.

Legazpi renamed Maynila Nueva Castilla, and declared it the capital of the Philippines, and thus of the rest of the Spanish East Indies, which also encompassed Spanish territories in Asia and the Pacific. Legazpi became the country's first governor-general. Under Spain, Luzon also came to be known as the Nueva Castilla or the New Castile. The population of Luzon at the time of the first Spanish missions is estimated as between 1 and 1.5 million, overall density being low. Moros from western Mindanao and the Sulu Archipelago also raided the coastal Christian areas of Luzon and the Visayas. Settlers had to fight off the Chinese pirates (who lay siege to Manila, the most famous of which was Limahong in 1573).

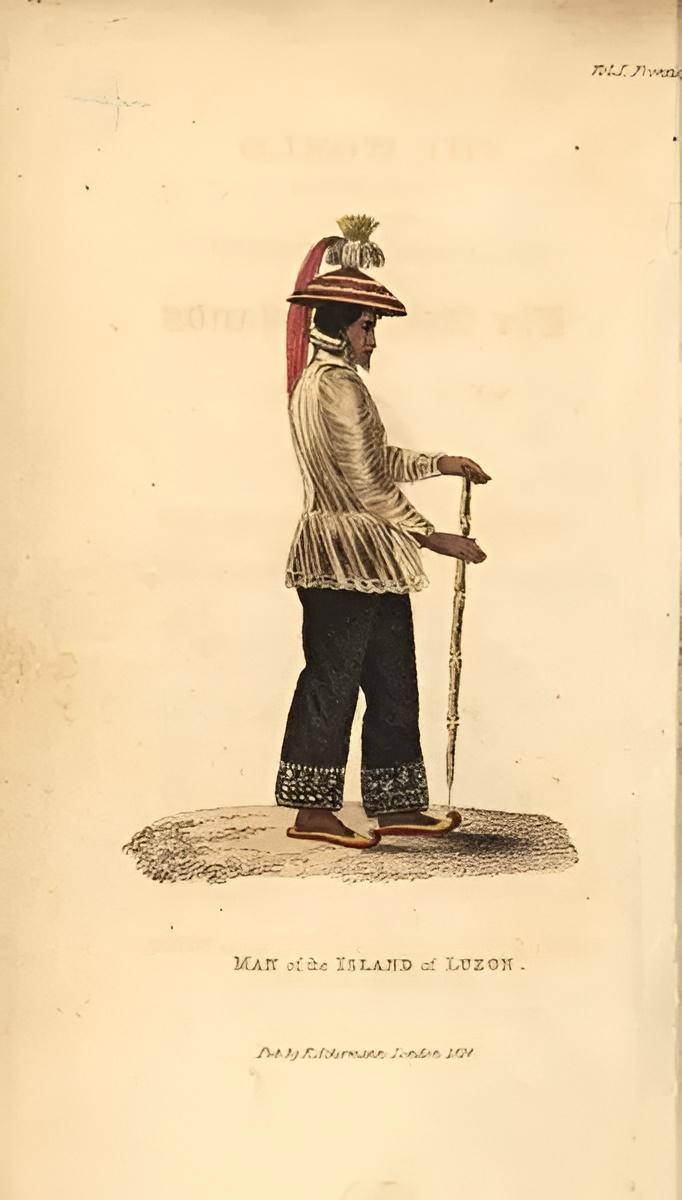
Man of the Island of Luzon 1820 by John Crawfurd

After the successful expedition and the exploration of the North, Juan de Salcedo founded "Villa Fernandina de Vigan" in honor of King Philip II's son, Prince Ferdinand, who died at the age of four. From Vigan, Salcedo rounded the tip of Luzón and proceeded to pacify Camarines, Albay, and Catanduanes. As a reward for his services to the King of Spain, Salcedo was awarded the old province of Ilocos, which consisted of the modern provinces of Ilocos Norte, Ilocos Sur, Abra, La Union and part of Mountain Province as his hacienda (estate), and was accorded the title of Justicia Mayor de esta Provincia de Ylocos (Province Mayor of Ilocos).

In Spanish times, Luzon became the focal point for trade between the Americas and Asia. The Manila Galleons constructed in the Bicol region brought silver mined from Peru and Mexico to Manila. The silver was used to purchase Asian commercial goods like Chinese silk, Indian gems and Indonesian spices, which were then exported back to the Americas. The Chinese valued Luzon so much, in that when talking about Spain and the Spanish-Americas, they preferred to call it as "Dao Lusong" (Greater Luzon) while the original Luzon was referred to as "Xiao (Small) Lusong" to refer to not only Luzon but the whole Philippines.

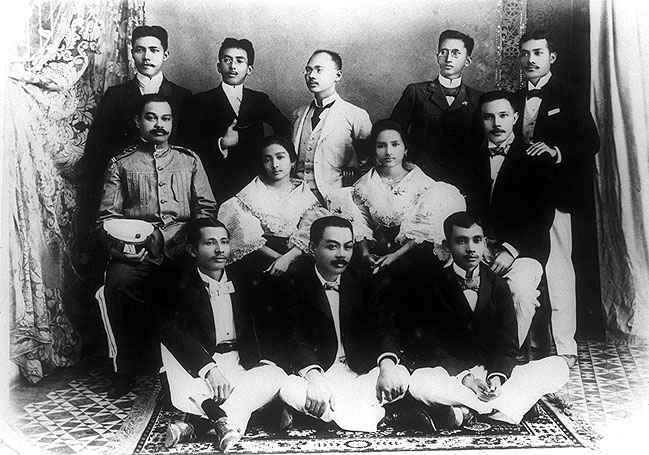
La Independencia staff from Manila

Luzon also became a focal point for global migration. The walled city of Intramuros was initially founded by 1200 Spanish families. The nearby district of Binondo became the center of business and transformed into the world's oldest Chinatown. There was also a smaller district reserved for Japanese migrants in Dilao. Cavite City also served as the main port for Luzon and many Mexican soldiers and sailors were stationed in the naval garrisons there. When the Spanish evacuated from Ternate, Indonesia; they settled the Papuan refugees in Ternate, Cavite which was named after their evacuated homeland. After the short British Occupation of Manila, the Indian Sepoy soldiers that mutinied against their British commanders and joined the Spanish, then settled in Cainta, Rizal.

Newcomers who were impoverished Mexicans and peninsulares were accused of undermining the submission of the natives. In Rafael Bernal's book: Mexico En Filipinas, Luzon island was considered full of Mexican descendants. In 1774, authorities from Bulacan, Tondo, Laguna Bay, and other areas surrounding Manila reported with consternation that discharged soldiers and deserters (from Mexico, Spain and Peru) were providing Indios military training for the weapons that had been disseminated all over the territory during the British war. There was also continuous immigration of Tamils and Bengalis into the rural areas of Luzon: Spanish administrators, native nobles, and Chinese businessmen imported them as slave labor during this period.

In the 1600s, Fr. Joaqin Martinez de Zuñiga, conducted a census of the Archdiocese of Manila which held most of Luzon under its spiritual care, and it had the following number of tributes, with each tribute representing a family of 6–7, and he reported 90,243 native Filipino tributes; 10,512 Chinese (Sangley) and mixed Chinese Filipino mestizo tributes; and 10,517 mixed Spanish Filipino mestizo tributes. Pure Spaniards are not counted as they are exempt from tribute. Out of these, Fr. Joaqin Martinez de Zuñiga estimated a total population count exceeding half a million souls.

People from the Philippines, primarily from Luzon, were recruited by France (then in alliance with Spain), first to defend Indo-Chinese converts to Christianity being persecuted by their native governments. Eventually, Filipino mercenaries helped the French conquer Vietnam and Laos and to re-establish Cambodia as a French Protectorate. This process culminated in the establishment of French Cochinchina, centered in Saigon.

A great number of infrastructure projects were undertaken during the 19th century that put the Philippine economy and standard of living ahead of most of its Asian neighbors and even many European countries at that time. Among them were a railway system for Luzon, a tramcar network for Manila, and Asia's first steel suspension bridge Puente Claveria, later called Puente Colgante. In the meantime, Luzonians and Filipinos living abroad; were active in the Mexican War of Independence, Argentine War of Independence, and the War of 1812 between the United States and the British Empire, at the Americas, while at the same time had fought in the Taiping Rebellion in China.

=== After Spanish colonization ===
After many years of Spanish occupation and resistance to reform, the Andres Novales uprising occurred and it was inspired by the Latin American Wars of Independence. Novales' uprising was primarily supported by Mexicans living in the Philippines as well as immigrant Latinos from the now independent nations of Colombia, Venezuela, Peru, Chile, Argentina and Costa Rica. Although the uprising failed it inspired the Cavite Mutiny, the suppression of which, lead to the martyrdoms of Priests, Gomburza and the subsequent execution of the reformist and hero, Jose Rizal. Reeling against this, the Philippine Revolution against Spain erupted in Cavite and spread all throughout Luzon and the Philippines. Consequently, the First Philippine Republic was established in Malolos, Bulacan. In the meantime, Spain sold the Philippines to the United States and the First Philippine Republic resisted the United States in the Philippine–American War which the Republic's forces lost due to its diplomatic isolation (no foreign nation recognized the First Republic) as well as due to the numerical superiority of the American military. The Americans then set up the cool mountain city of Baguio as a summer retreat for its officials. The Americans also rebuilt the capital, Manila, and established American military bases in Olongapo and Angeles cities mainly Clark Airbase and Subic Naval Base.

During the Pacific War, the Philippines were considered to be of great strategic importance because their capture by Japan would pose a significant threat to the US. As a result, 135,000 troops and 227 aircraft were stationed in the Philippines by October 1941. Luzon was captured by Imperial Japanese forces in 1942 during their campaign to capture the Philippines. General Douglas MacArthur—who was in charge of the defense of the Philippines at the time—was ordered to Australia, and the remaining US forces retreated to the Bataan Peninsula.

A few months after this, MacArthur expressed his belief that an attempt to recapture the Philippines was necessary. The US Pacific Commander Admiral Chester Nimitz and Chief of Naval Operations Admiral Ernest King both opposed this idea, arguing that it must wait until victory was certain. MacArthur had to wait two years for his wish; it was 1944 before a campaign to recapture the Philippines was launched. The island of Leyte was the first objective of the campaign, which was captured by the end of December 1944. This was followed by the attack on Mindoro and later, Luzon.

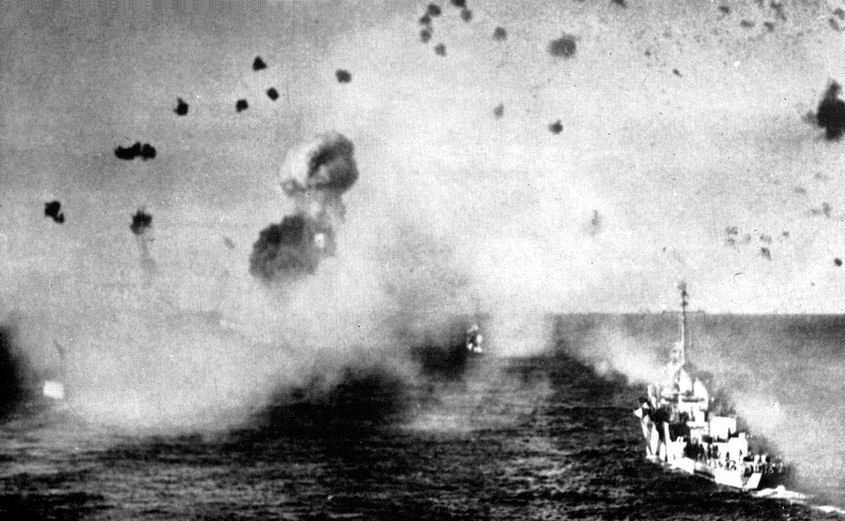
US Navy ships under attack while entering Lingayen Gulf, January 1945

The end of the World War necessitated decolonization due to rising nationalist movements across the world's many colonies. Subsequently, the Philippines gained independence from the United States. Luzon then arose to become the most developed island in the Philippines. However, the lingering poverty and inequality caused by the long dictatorship of US-supported dictator, Ferdinand Marcos, gave rise to the Philippine diaspora and many people from Luzon have migrated elsewhere and had established large overseas communities; mainly in the United States, Hong Kong, Singapore and Saudi Arabia. Eventually, the People Power Revolution led by Corazon Aquino and Cardinal Jaime Sin, removed Marcos and his cronies from power and they fled to Hawaii where the US granted them asylum. The following administrations are subsequently managing the political and economic recovery of the Philippines with the particular aim of spreading development outside of Luzon and into the more isolated provinces of the Visayas and Mindanao. During the administration of Ferdinand Marcos' son, Bongbong Marcos, Luzon became a destination of American and Japanese enterprises, plus investments from other G7 Nations, as well as other members of the Pax Silica Initiative, it being the location of the Luzon Economic Corridor.

== Geography ==
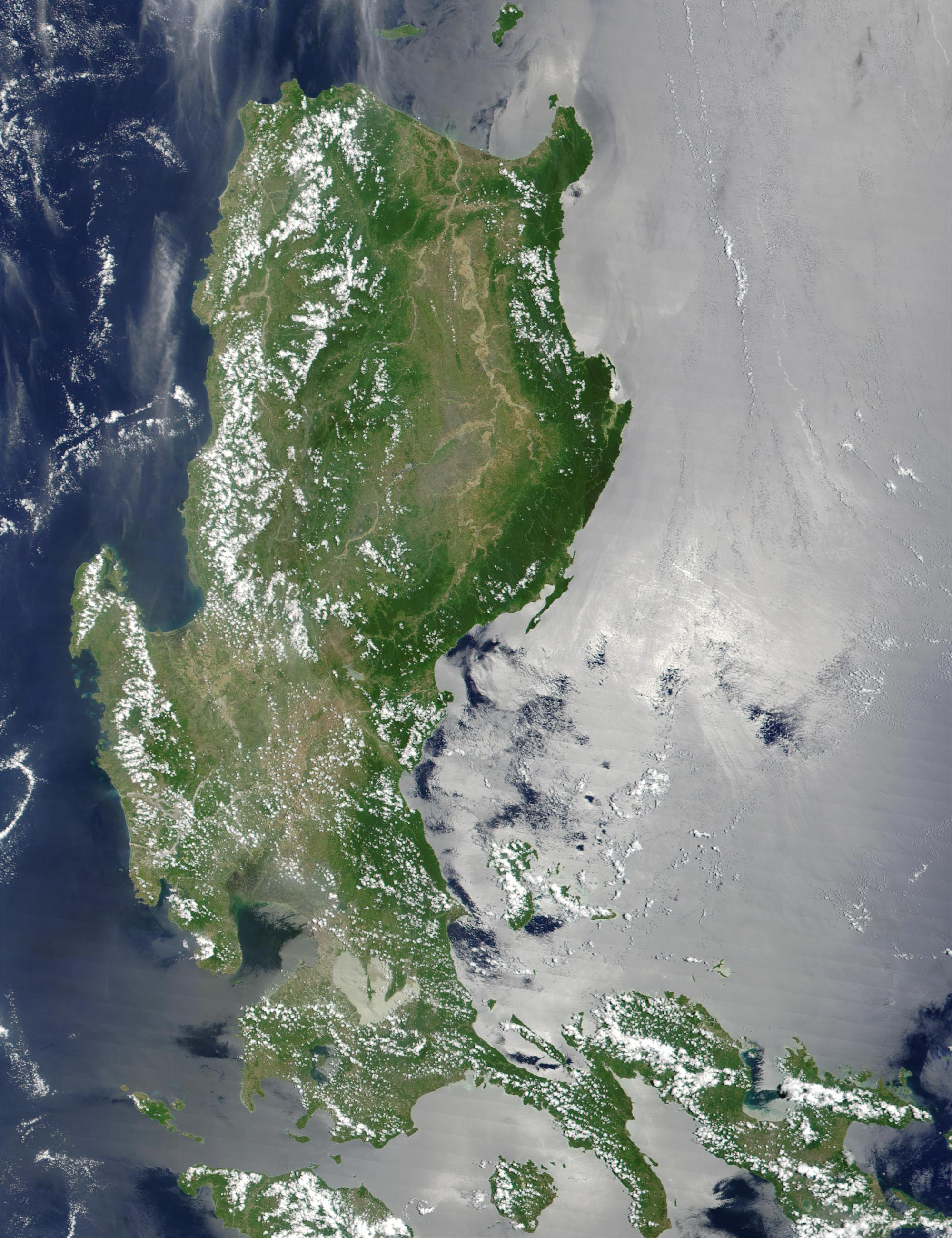
Satellite image of Luzon

Luzon island alone has an area of 109,964.9 square kilometres (42,457.7 sq mi), making it the world's 15th largest island. It is bordered on the west by the South China Sea (Luzon Sea in Philippine territorial waters), on the east by the Philippine Sea, and on the north by the Luzon Strait containing the Babuyan Channel and Balintang Channel. The mainland is roughly rectangular in shape and has the long Bicol Peninsula protruding to the southeast.

Luzon is roughly divided into four sections; Northern Luzon, Central Luzon, Southern Luzon, and Metro Manila.

| Regions | Six divisions | Four divisions | Three divisions |
|---|---|---|---|
| Ilocos Region | Ilocandia | Northern Luzon | North and Central Luzon/North Central Luzon |
| Cagayan Valley | Ilocandia | Northern Luzon | North and Central Luzon/North Central Luzon |
| Cordillera Administrative Region | Cordilleras | Northern Luzon | North and Central Luzon/North Central Luzon |
| Central Luzon | Central Luzon | | North and Central Luzon/North Central Luzon |
| Calabarzon | Southern Tagalog | Southern Luzon | |
| Mimaropa | Southern Tagalog | Southern Luzon | |
| Bicol Region | Bicolandia | Southern Luzon | |
| National Capital Region | Metro Manila | | |

=== Physical ===
==== Northern Luzon ====
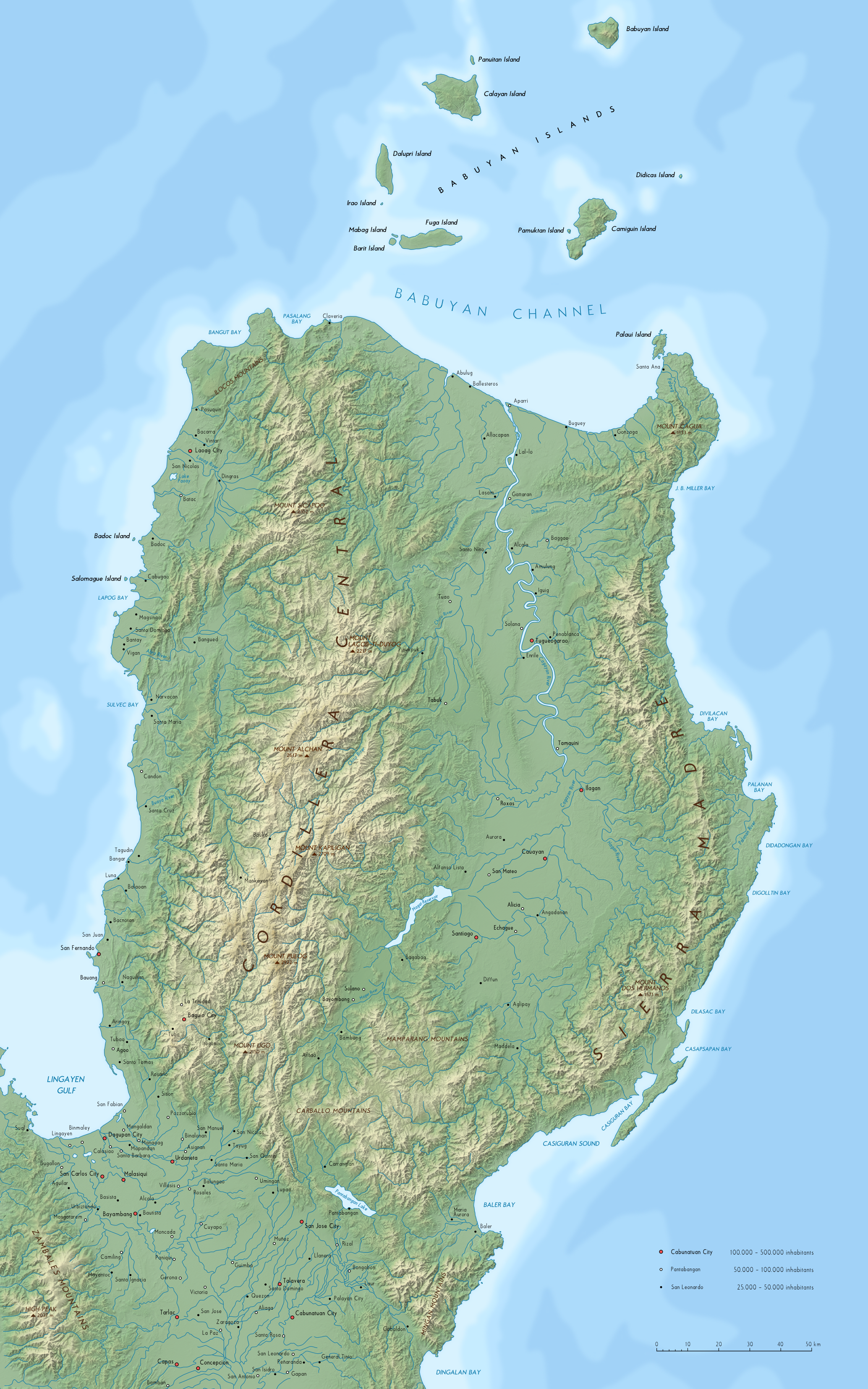
Northern Luzon.

Northern Luzon consists of 3 clusters in three regions, the Ilocos Region, the Cordillera Administrative Region and the Cagayan Valley.

The northwestern portion of the island, which encompasses most of the Ilocos Region, is characterized by a flat terrain extending east from the coastline toward the Cordillera Central mountains.

The Cordillera mountain range, which feature the island's north-central section, is covered in a mixture of tropical pine forests and montane rainforests, and is the site of the island's highest mountain, Mount Pulag, rising at 2,922 metres. The range provides the upland headwaters of the Agno River, which stretches from the slopes of Mount Data, and meanders along the southern Cordillera mountains before reaching the plains of Pangasinan.

The northeastern section of Luzon is generally mountainous, with the Sierra Madre, the longest mountain range in the country, abruptly rising a few miles from the coastline. Located in between the Sierra Madre and the Cordillera Central mountain ranges is the large Cagayan Valley. This region, which is known for being the second largest producer of rice and the country's top corn-producer, serves as the basin for the Cagayan River, the longest in the Philippines.

Along the southern limits of the Cordillera Central lies the lesser-known Caraballo Mountains. These mountains form a link between the Cordillera Central and the Sierra Madre mountain ranges, separating the Cagayan Valley from the Central Luzon plains.

===== Image gallery =====
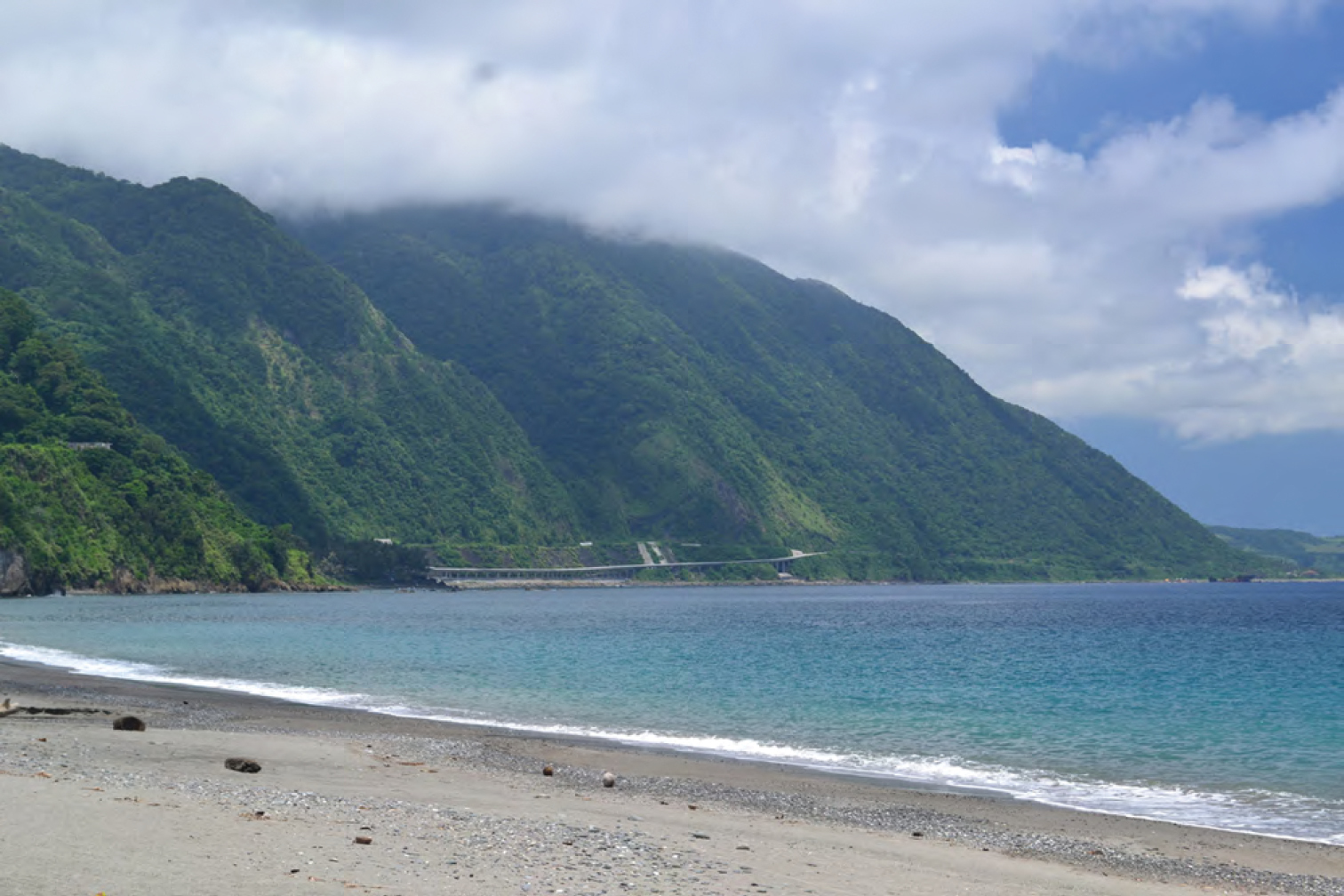
North coast of Luzon along the Cagayan-Ilocos Norte boundary

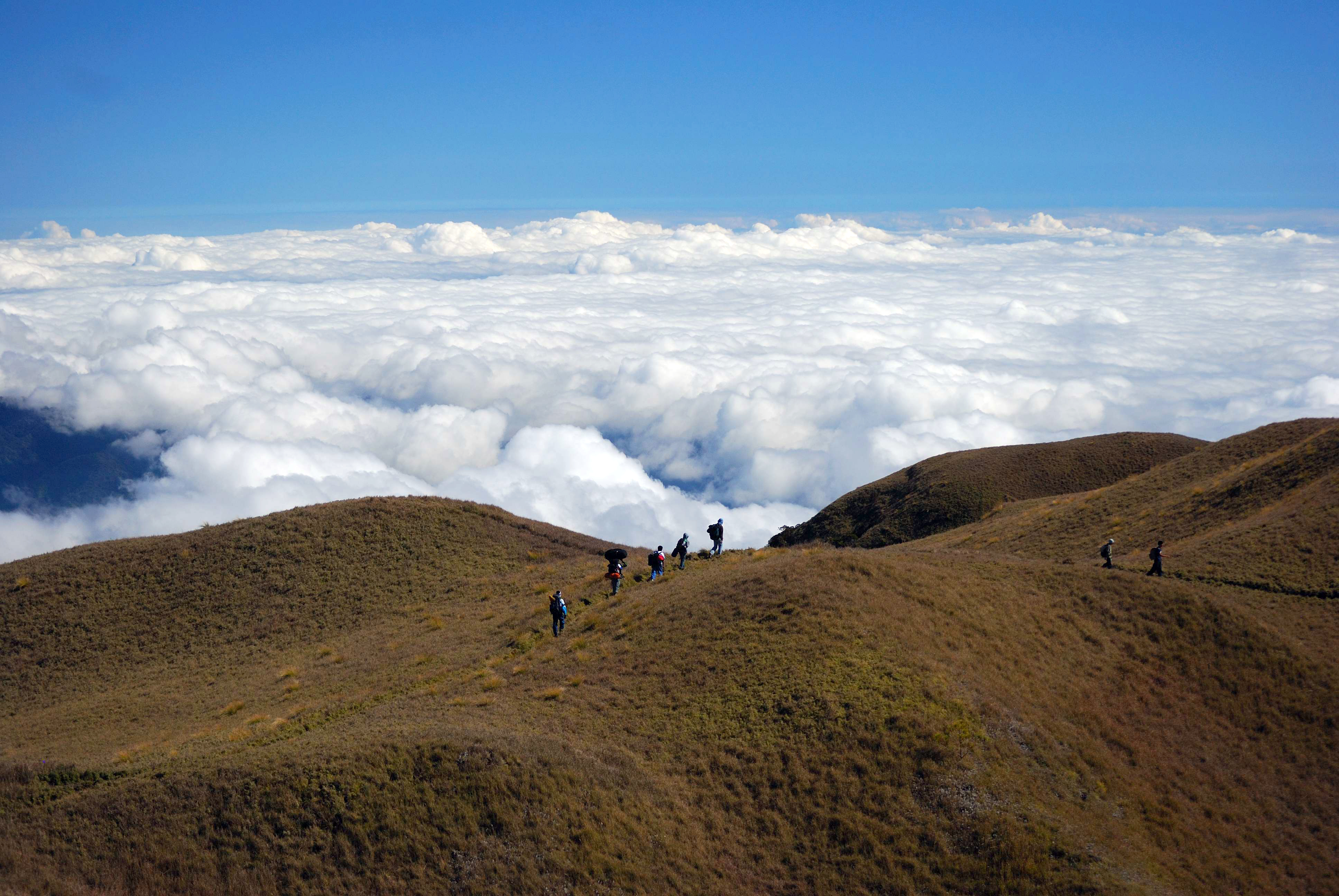
Summit of Mount Pulag, Luzon's highest mountain

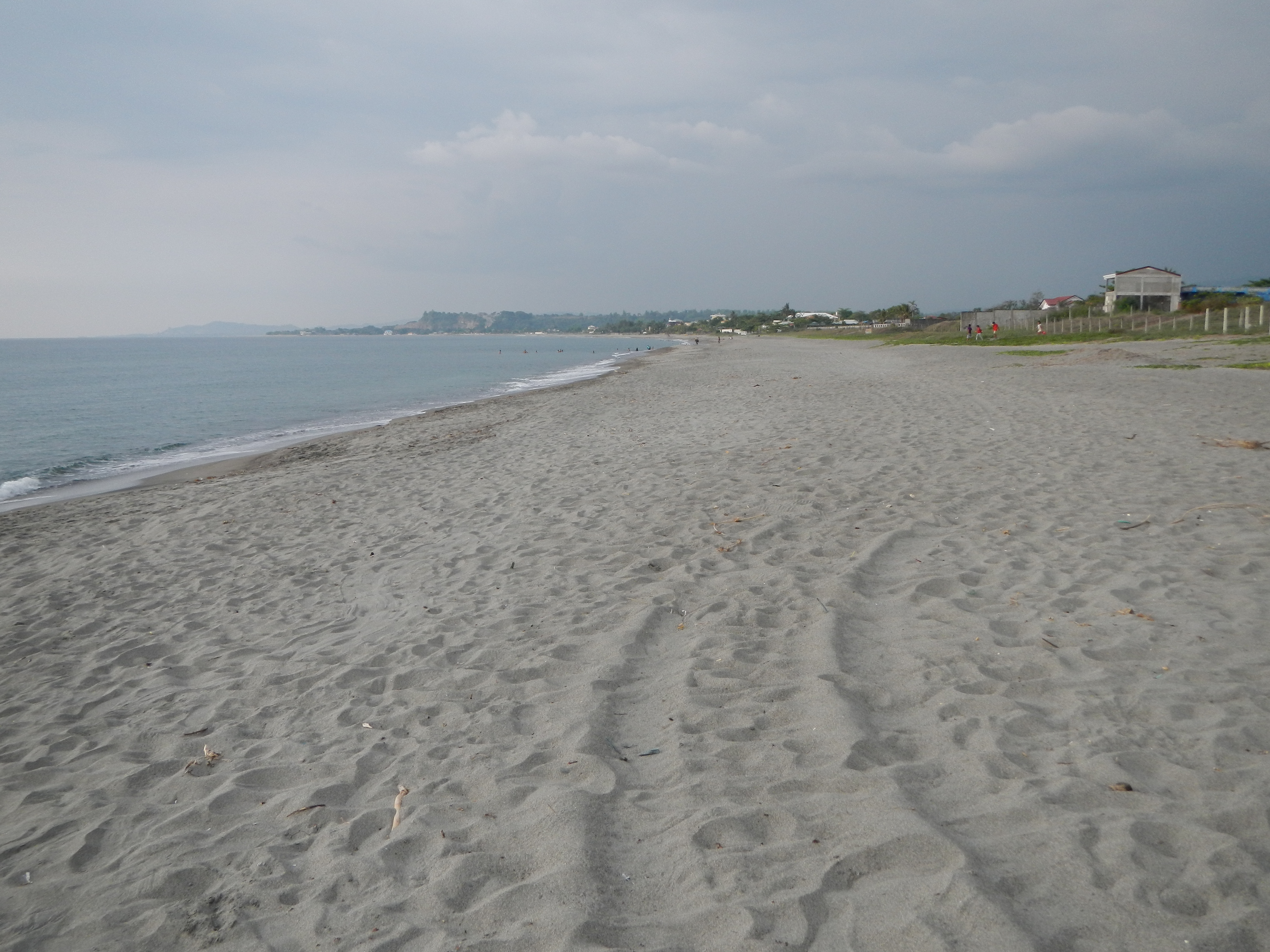
West coast of Luzon at San Juan overlooking the South China Sea

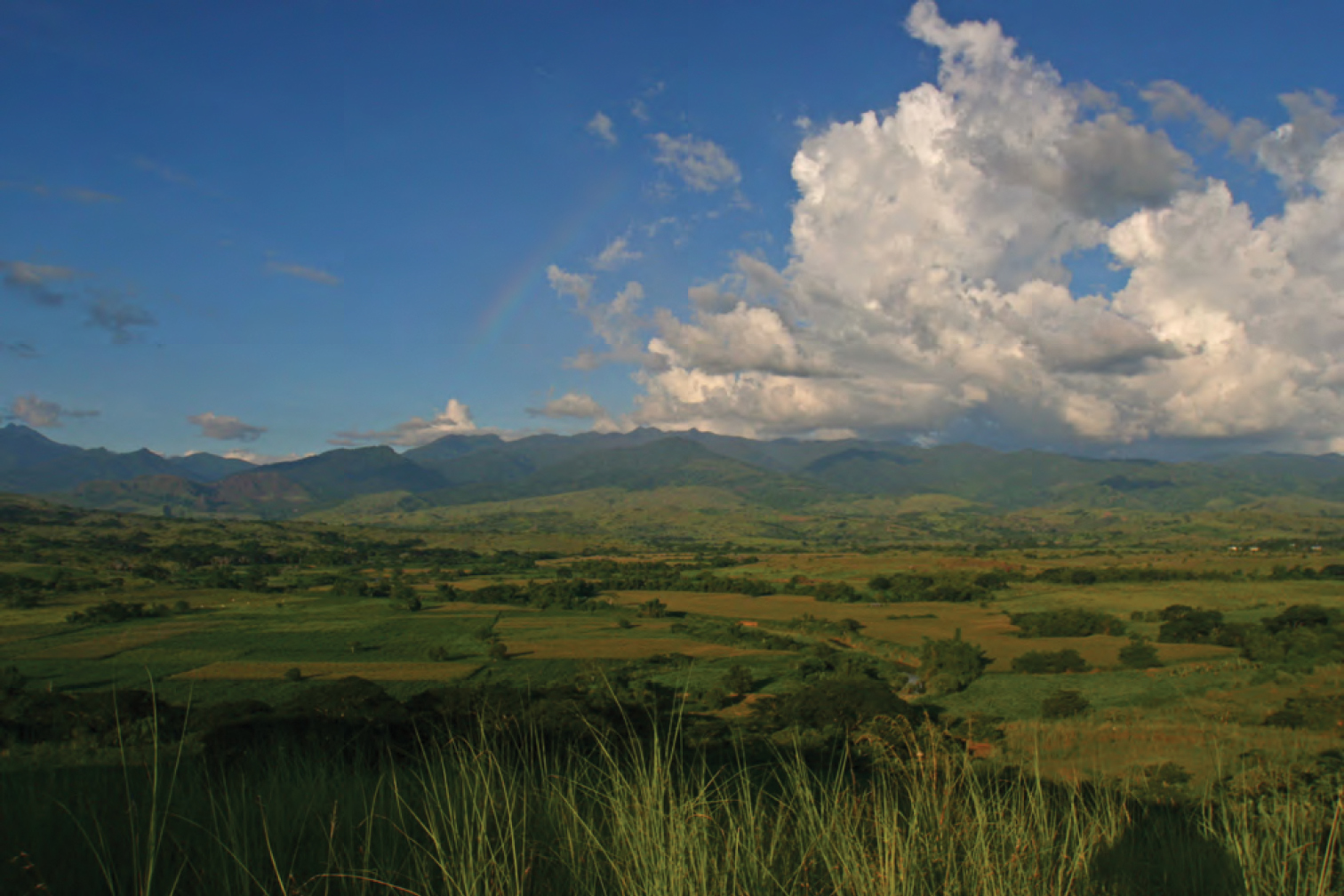
The Cagayan Valley at Cabagan with the Sierra Madre mountains in the background

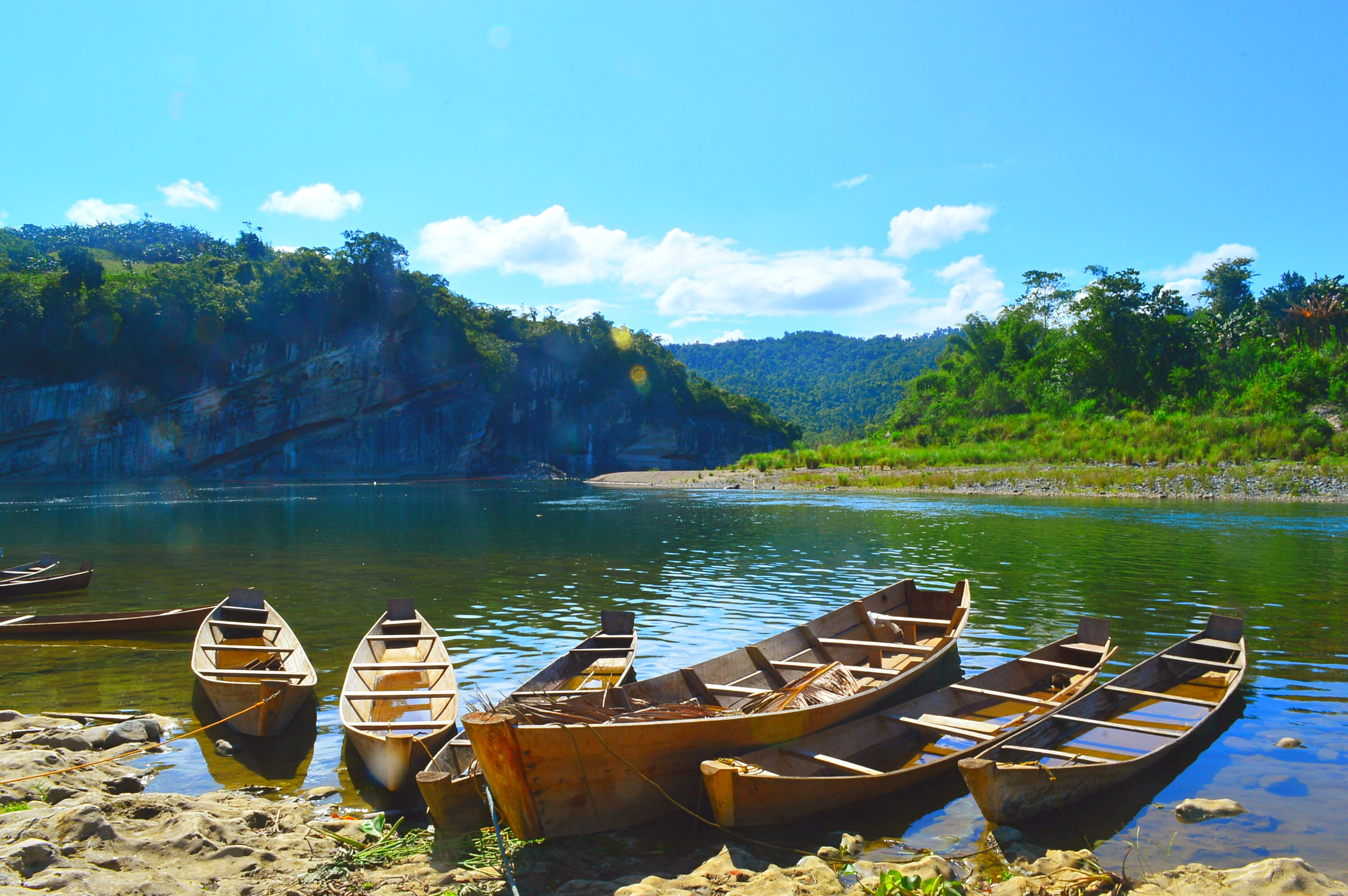
Canoes along upstream Cagayan River at Quirino province

==== Central Luzon ====
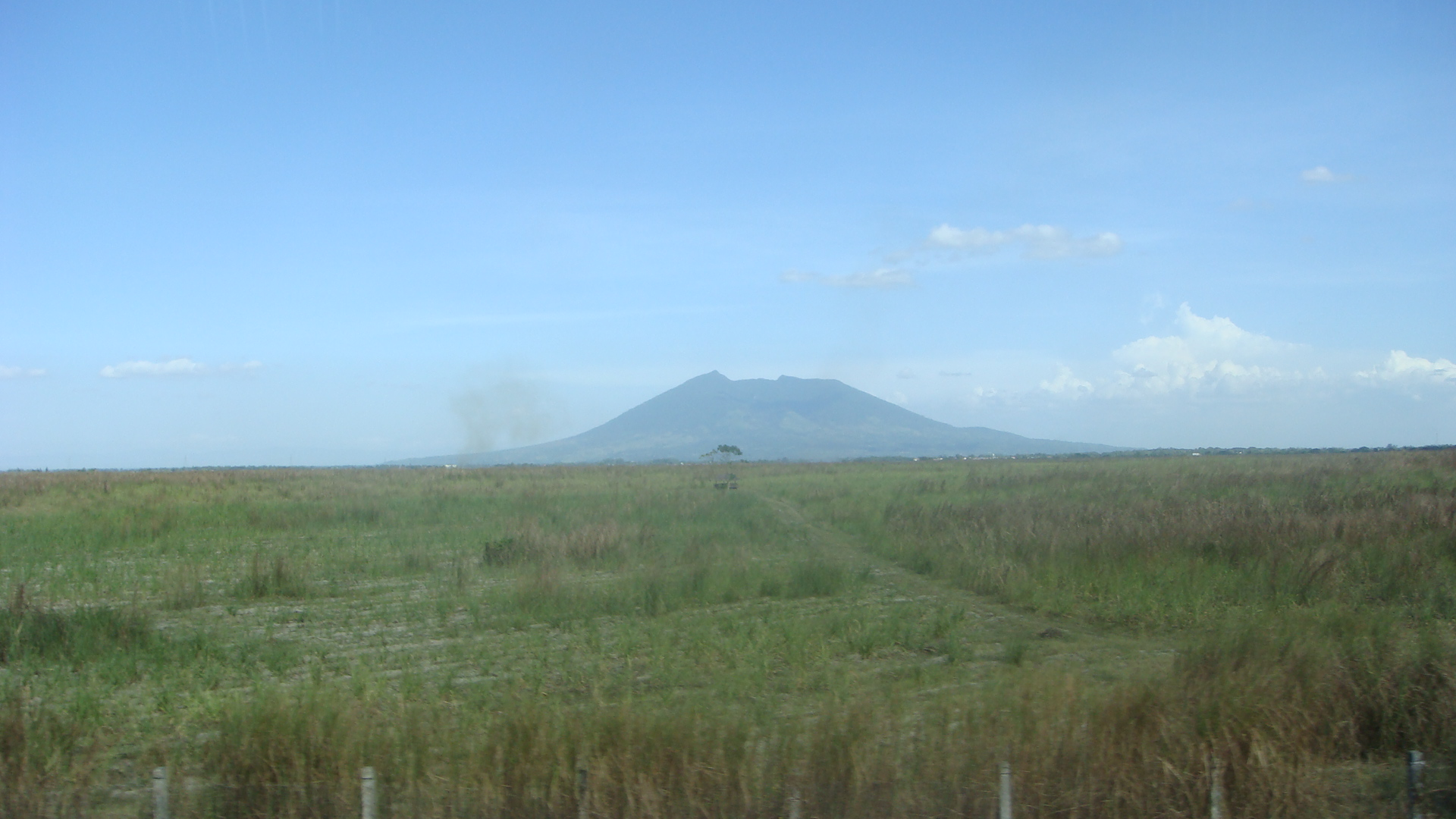
The Central Luzon plain with Mount Arayat in the background

The central section of Luzon is characterized by a flat terrain, known as the Central Luzon plain, the largest in the island in terms of land area. The plain, approximately 11,000 square kilometres (4,200 sq mi) in size, is the country's largest producer of rice, and is irrigated by two major rivers; the Cagayan to the north, and the Pampanga to the south. In the middle of the plain rises the solitary Mount Arayat.

The western coasts of Central Luzon are typically flat extending east from the coastline to the Zambales Mountains, the site of Mount Pinatubo, made famous because of its enormous 1991 eruption. These mountains extend to the sea in the north, forming Lingayen Gulf, and to the south, forming the Bataan Peninsula. The peninsula encloses Manila Bay, a natural harbor considered to be one of the best natural ports in East Asia, due to its size and strategic geographical location.

The Sierra Madre mountain range continues to stretch across the western section of Central Luzon, snaking southwards into the Bicol Peninsula.

Central Luzon is located between the regions of Northern Luzon, Southern Luzon and Metro Manila. These are the provinces of: Aurora, Bataan, Bulacan, Nueva Ecija, Pampanga, Tarlac and Zambales. The province of Aurora in the middle of the year 2002 was included in the Southern Tagalog Region. The regional center of Central Luzon is San Fernando, Pampanga.

===== 4 Divisions =====
| Region | Regional Center | Division |
|---|---|---|
| Ilocos Region, 1 | San Fernando, La Union | Northwestern Luzon |
| Cordillera Administrative Region (CAR) | Baguio | Northcentral Luzon |
| Cagayan Valley, 2 | Tuguegarao | Northeastern Luzon |
| Central Luzon, 3 | San Fernando, Pampanga | Central Luzon |

==== Southern Luzon ====
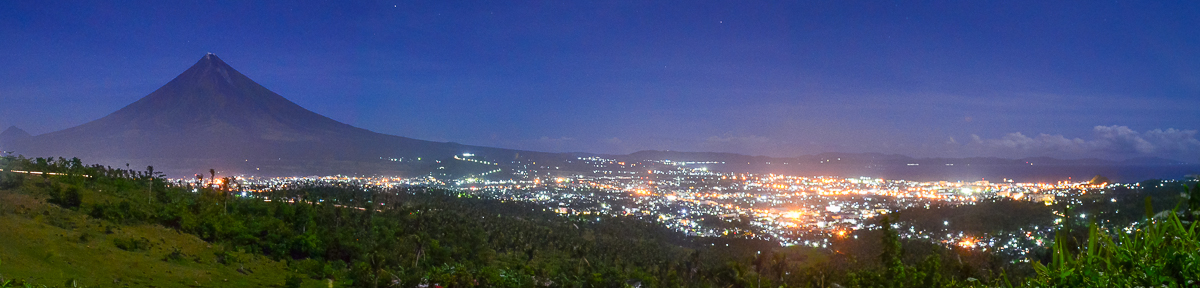
The conical Mayon Volcano and the city of Legazpi in Albay province

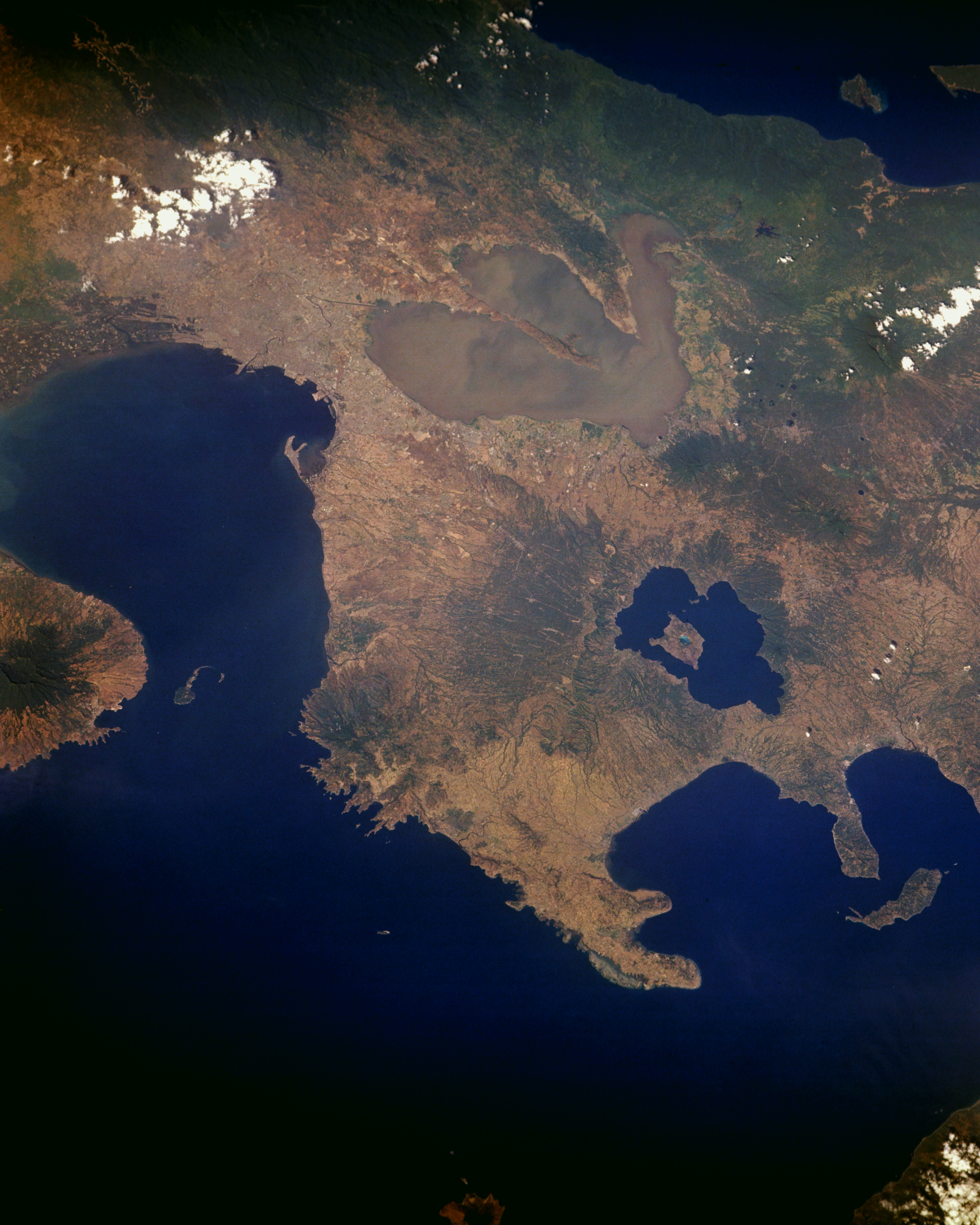

| 1 | Manila Bay |
| 2 | Laguna de Bay |
| 3 | Taal Volcano / Taal Lake |
| 4 | Bataan Peninsula |
| 5 | Balayan Bay |

| 6 | Batangas Bay |
| 7 | South China Sea |
| 8 | Mindoro Island |
| 9 | Lamon Bay |

Southern Luzon is dominated by Laguna de Bay (Old Spanish, "Lake of Bay town"), the largest lake in the country. The 949-square-kilometre (366 sq mi) lake is drained into Manila Bay by the Pasig River, one of the most important rivers in the country due to its historical significance and because it runs through the center of Metro Manila.

Located 20 kilometres (12 mi) southwest of Laguna de Bay is Taal Lake, a crater lake containing the Taal Volcano, the smallest in the country. The environs of the lake form the upland Tagaytay Ridge, which was once part of a massive prehistoric volcano that covered the southern portion of the province of Cavite and the whole of Batangas province.

South of Laguna Lake are two solitary mountains, Mount Makiling in Laguna and Batangas provinces, and Mount Banahaw, the highest in the region of Calabarzon.

Mainland Southern Tagalog is the current region of Calabarzon which consists of Cavite, Laguna, Batangas, Rizal and Quezon, and Mimaropa is Region IV-B which is considered the Southwestern Tagalog Region is in the outland.

The southeastern portion of Luzon is dominated by the Bicol Peninsula, a mountainous and narrow region extending approximately 150 kilometres (93 mi) southeast from the Tayabas Isthmus in Quezon province to the San Bernardino Strait along the coasts of Sorsogon. The area is home to several volcanoes, the most famous of which is the 2,460-metre (8,070 ft) high symmetrically-shaped Mayon Volcano in Albay province. The Sierra Madre range has its southern limits at Quezon province. Ultra-prominent mountains dot the landscape, which include Mount Isarog and Mount Iriga in Camarines Sur, and Mount Bulusan in Sorsogon.

The peninsula's coastline features several smaller peninsulas, gulfs and bays, which include Lamon Bay, San Miguel Bay, Lagonoy Gulf, Ragay Gulf, and Sorsogon Bay.

It consists of Bicolandia or Region 5 which is the last region on the island of Luzon.

===== 3 Divisions =====
| Region | Regional Center | Division |
|---|---|---|
| Calabarzon, 4-A | Calamba | Southern Luzon |
| Mimaropa, 4-B | Calapan | Southwestern Luzon |
| Bicol Region, 5 | Legazpi | Southeastern Luzon |

==== Metro Manila ====
Metro Manila is the urban center and seat of government of the Philippines, with the country's capital Manila is part of the metropolitan area which also serves as its regional center. It consists of 16 cities and one town. Metro Manila was formerly a province or province that included the name Tondo. In 1898, it included the districts and barangays of each city area. The metropolitan area also carved Valenzuela from Bulacan in Central Luzon as well as some towns in the province of Rizal of Southern Luzon.

===== 1 Division =====
| Region | Regional Center | Division |
|---|---|---|
| Metro Manila, NCR | Manila | Metro Manila |

==== Outlying islands ====
Several outlying islands near mainland Luzon are considered part of the Luzon island group. The largest include Palawan, Mindoro, Masbate, Catanduanes, Marinduque, Romblon and Polillo.

=== Administrative divisions ===
The island is covered by 8 administrative regions, 30 provinces and, as of 2014, 68 cities (8 regions, 38 provinces and 71 cities if associated islands are included).

| Region (designation) | Location | Population (2020) | Area (Note: Land area figures are the sum of each region's component provinces (and/or independent cities), derived from the National Statistical Coordination Board (Philippine Statistics Authority) official website.) | Density | Regional center |
|---|---|---|---|---|---|
| Ilocos Region (Region I) | Map of the Philippines highlighting the Ilocos Region | 5,301,139 (4.9%) | 13,012.60 km^{2} (5,024.19 sq mi) | 410/km^{2} (1,100/sq mi) | San Fernando (La Union) |
| Cagayan Valley (Note: The list includes the associated islands of Luzon (provinces of Marinduque, Occidental Mindoro, Oriental Mindoro, Palawan, Romblon, Batanes, Catanduanes and Masbate).) (Region II) | Map of the Philippines highlighting Cagayan Valley | 3,685,744 (3.4%) | 28,228.83 km^{2} (10,899.21 sq mi) | 130/km^{2} (340/sq mi) | Tuguegarao |
| Central Luzon (Region III) | Map of the Philippines highlighting Central Luzon | 12,422,172 (11.4%) | 22,014.63 km^{2} (8,499.90 sq mi) | 560/km^{2} (1,500/sq mi) | San Fernando (Pampanga) |
| Calabarzon (Region IV-A) | Map of the Philippines highlighting Calabarzon | 16,195,042 (14.9%) | 16,873.31 km^{2} (6,514.82 sq mi) | 960/km^{2} (2,500/sq mi) | Calamba |
| Southwestern Tagalog Region (Mimaropa; Region IV-B) | Map of the Philippines highlighting MIMAROPA | 3,228,558 (3.0%) | 29,620.90 km^{2} (11,436.69 sq mi) | 110/km^{2} (280/sq mi) | Calapan |
| Bicol Region (Region V) | Map of the Philippines highlighting the Bicol Region | 6,082,165 (5.6%) | 18,155.82 km^{2} (7,010.00 sq mi) | 330/km^{2} (850/sq mi) | Legazpi |
| Cordillera Administrative Region (CAR) | Map of the Philippines highlighting Cordillera Administrative Region | 1,797,660 (1.6%) | 19,422.03 km^{2} (7,498.89 sq mi) | 93/km^{2} (240/sq mi) | Baguio |
| National Capital Region (NCR) | Map of the Philippines highlighting the National Capital Region | 13,484,462 (12.4%) | 611.39 km^{2} (236.06 sq mi) | 22,000/km^{2} (57,000/sq mi) | Manila |

Table note(s):

=== Tectonics ===
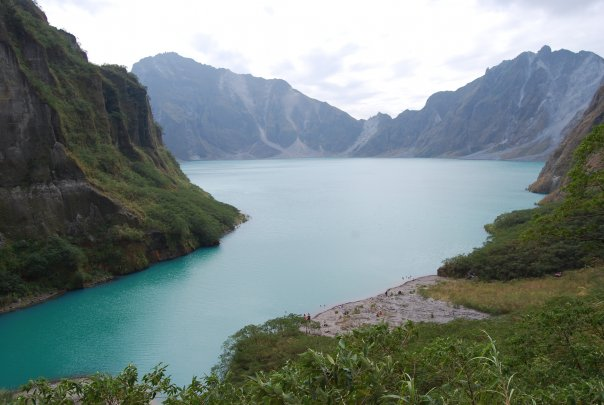
Lake Pinatubo in Zambales

Luzon is part of the Philippine Mobile Belt, a fast deforming plate boundary zone (Gervasio, 1967) hemmed in between two opposing subduction zones, the west-dipping Philippine Trench-East Luzon Trench subduction zone, and the east-dipping north–south trending Manila Trench-Negros Trench-Cotabato Trench. The Philippine Sea Plate subducts under eastern Luzon along the East Luzon Trench and the Philippine Trench, while the South China Sea basin, part of the Eurasian Plate, subducts under western Luzon along the Manila Trench.

The North-Southeastern trending braided left-lateral strike-slip Philippine Fault System traverses Luzon, from Quezon province and Bicol to the northwestern part of the island. This fault system takes up part of the motion due to the subducting plates and produces large earthquakes. Southwest of Luzon is a collision zone where the Palawan micro-block collides with SW Luzon, producing a highly seismic zone near Mindoro island. Southwest Luzon is characterized by a highly volcanic zone, called the Macolod Corridor, a region of crustal thinning and spreading.

Using geologic and structural data, seven principal blocks were identified in Luzon in 1989: the Sierra Madre Oriental, Angat, Zambales, Central Cordillera of Luzon, Bicol, and Catanduanes Island blocks. Using seismic and geodetic data, Luzon was modeled by Galgana et al. (2007) as a series of six micro blocks or micro plates (separated by subduction zones and intra-arc faults), all translating and rotating in different directions, with maximum velocities ~100 mm/yr NW with respect to Sundaland/Eurasia.

== Demographics ==
Population census of Luzon
| Year | Pop. | ±% p.a. |
|---|---|---|
| 1903 | 4,101,516 | — |
| 1918 | 5,397,401 | +1.85% |
| 1939 | 8,165,778 | +1.99% |
| 1948 | 9,876,263 | +2.14% |
| 1960 | 14,061,448 | +2.99% |
| 1970 | 19,688,100 | +3.42% |
| 1975 | 22,790,274 | +2.98% |
| 1980 | 26,080,694 | +2.73% |
| 1990 | 33,357,887 | +2.49% |
| 1995 | 38,249,776 | +2.60% |
| 2000 | 42,822,686 | +2.45% |
| 2007 | 49,799,956 | +2.10% |
| 2010 | 52,362,999 | +1.84% |
| 2015 | 57,470,097 | +1.79% |
| 2020 | 62,196,942 | +1.68% |
| 2024 | 64,301,558 | +0.80% |
Source: National Statistics Office (Note: Figure composed of the eight administrative regions excluding the island provinces of Batanes, Catanduanes, and Masbate and the region MIMAROPA.)

As of the 2024 census, the population of Luzon Island itself is 59,865,193 people, making it the 4th most populated island in the world.

=== Cities ===
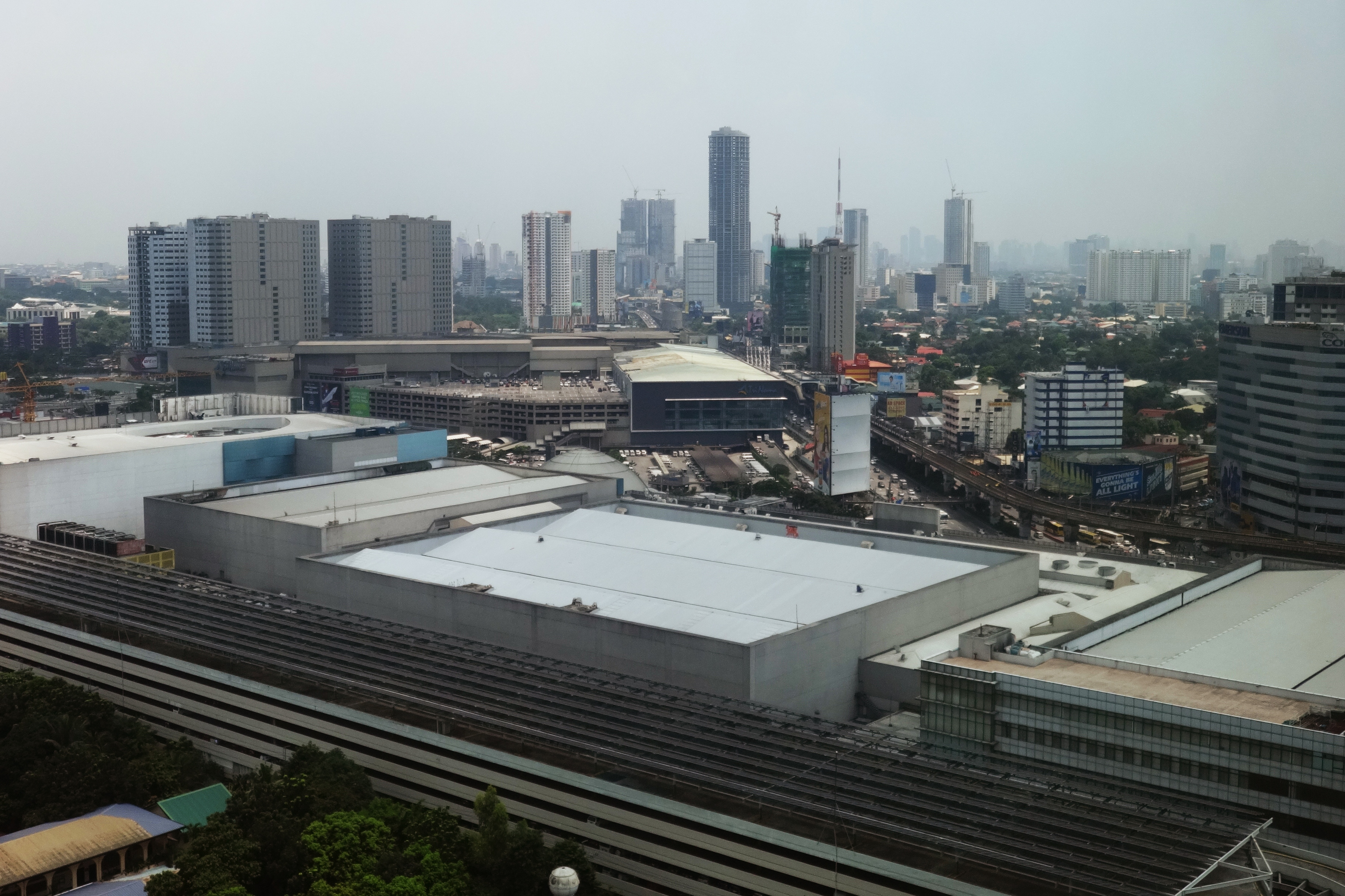
A view of Quezon City in September 2017, the largest city in Luzon island

Metro Manila is the most populous of the 3 defined metropolitan areas in the Philippines and the 11th most populous in the world. as of 2007, census data showed it had a population of 11,553,427, comprising 13 percent of the national population. Including suburbs in the adjacent provinces (Bulacan, Cavite, Laguna, and Rizal) of Greater Manila, the population is around 21 million.

Largest cities in Luzon PSA Census July 2024
| Rank | Name | Region | Pop. | Rank | Name | Region | Pop. |
|---|---|---|---|---|---|---|---|
| 1 | Quezon City | National Capital Region | 3,084,270 | 11 | Bacoor | Calabarzon | 661,381 |
| 2 | Manila | National Capital Region | 1,902,590 | 12 | Las Piñas | National Capital Region | 615,549 |
| 3 | Caloocan | National Capital Region | 1,712,945 | 13 | Biñan | Calabarzon | 584,479 |
| 4 | Taguig | National Capital Region | 1,308,085 | 14 | Calamba | Calabarzon | 575,046 |
| 5 | Antipolo | Calabarzon | 913,712 | 15 | Muntinlupa | National Capital Region | 552,225 |
| 6 | Pasig | National Capital Region | 853,050 | 16 | Angeles | Central Luzon | 483,452 |
| 7 | Dasmariñas | Calabarzon | 744,511 | 17 | General Trias | Calabarzon | 482,453 |
| 8 | Valenzuela | National Capital Region | 725,173 | 18 | Imus | Calabarzon | 481,949 |
| 9 | Parañaque | National Capital Region | 703,245 | 19 | Marikina | National Capital Region | 471,323 |
| 10 | San Jose del Monte | Central Luzon | 685,688 | 20 | Mandaluyong | National Capital Region | 465,902 |

Largest cities and municipalities in the Luzon island group
(2015 Census, 100,000+ inhabitants)

=== Ethnic groups ===
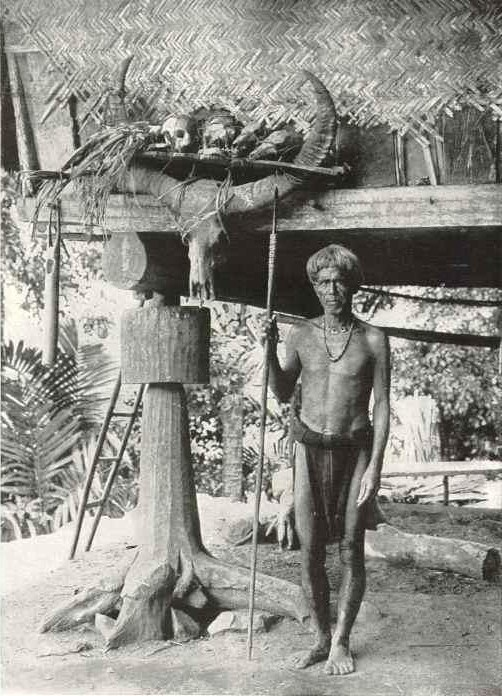
An Ifugao warrior with some of his trophies, Cordillera Mountains, c. 1912

Seven major Philippine ethnolinguistic groups predominate Luzon. Ilocanos and Pangasinenses dominate northern Luzon, particularly in the Ilocos Region to parts of the Cagayan Valley, while Kapampangans, Tagalogs, Ilocanos, Pangasinans and Sambals populate Central Luzon. Tagalogs dominate the National Capital Region, Calabarzon and the island provinces of Marinduque, Mindoro and extending to parts of Palawan and northern Bicol Peninsula, while Bicolanos populate the Bicol peninsula. Visayans, such as Masbateños, Romblomanons, Waray Sorsogonons, Cuyunons, mainly populate in the southern Bicol peninsula and island provinces of Masbate, Romblon, and Palawan.

Other ethnic groups lesser in population include the Aetas of Zambales and Bataan, the Ibanags of Cagayan and Isabela, the Gaddang of Nueva Vizcaya, the Igorot of the Cordilleras, the Bugkalots of Nueva Vizcaya, Quirino, Nueva Ecija and Aurora, Umiray and Tagabulós of Aurora and Quezon, Remontado of Quezon, and the Mangyans of Mindoro.

Due to historical centuries-old migrations, populations of ethnic Chinese Filipinos, Spanish Filipinos, Japanese Filipinos, Indian Filipinos, and Muslim Moros from Mindanao have also been present in urban areas. Historical mixed mestizo populations, particularly Chinese mestizos (mestizo de Sangley) and Spanish mestizos, and more recent mixed mestizos of Americans, Japanese, Koreans, Indians (mostly Punjabis), and Arabs are also occasionally present.

The historical Sangley Chinese and their pure and mixed-mestizo descendants are spread all across Luzon of several generations across the centuries.

According to old Spanish censuses, around 1/3rd of the population of Luzon are mestizo admixed with either or both Southern Han Chinese (mostly from Manila to Pampanga) and/or Hispanic (Spanish or Latino) descent.

Most expatriates from the United States have settled in Central Luzon's highly urbanized cities of Angeles and Olongapo due to the former presence of the US air and naval bases (Clark & Subic) there.

Most of the Koreans and Japanese which have moved to Luzon have mainly settled in places like Baguio,Subic, and Koreatown in Angeles City.

=== Languages ===
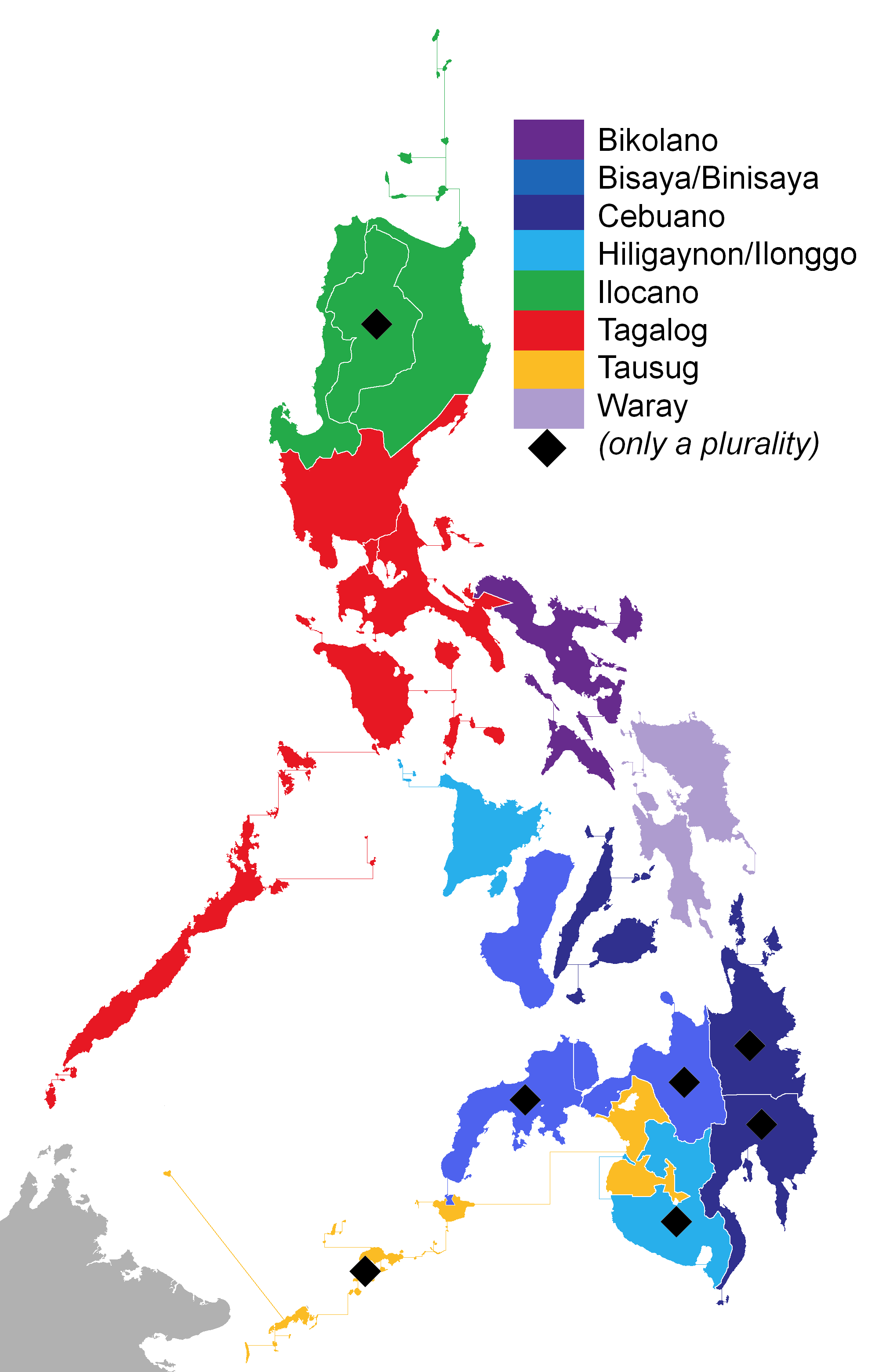
Dominant languages per administrative region

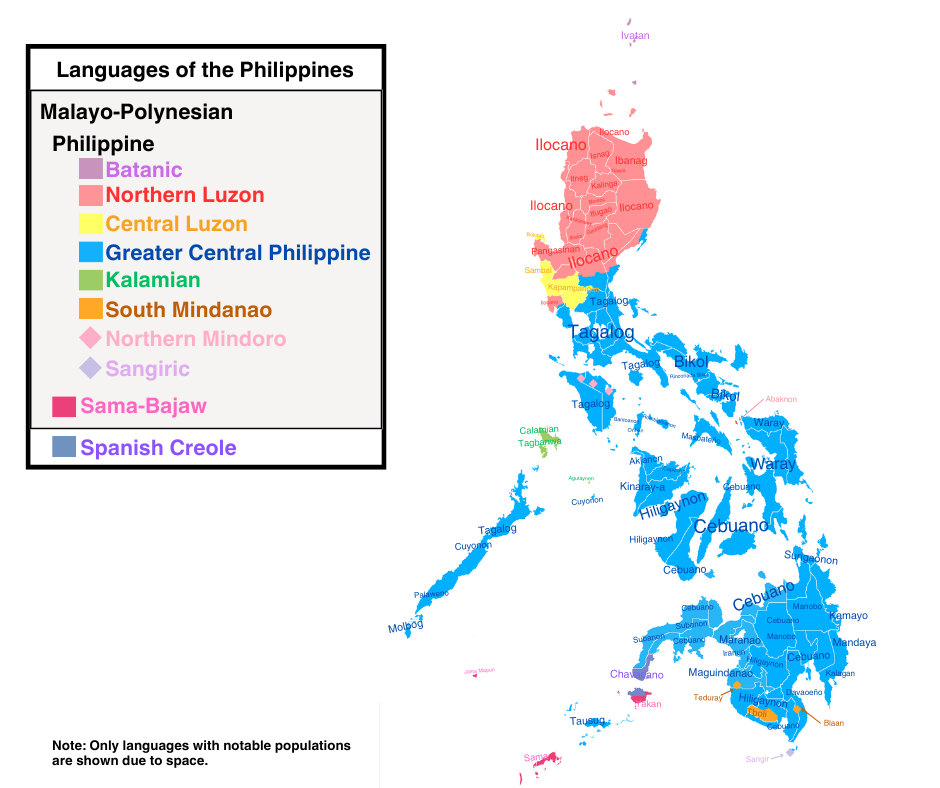
Major languages per province, showing their subdivisions.

Almost all of the languages of Luzon belong to the Philippine group of the Malayo-Polynesian branch of the Austronesian language family. Major regional languages include: Tagalog, Ilocano, Central Bikol, Kapampangan, and Pangasinan.

English is spoken by many inhabitants. The use of Spanish as an official language declined following the American occupation of the Philippines. Almost inexistent among the general populace, Spanish is still used by the elderly of some families of great tradition (Rizal, Liboro...) and by upper and middle-class residents of Spanish blood.

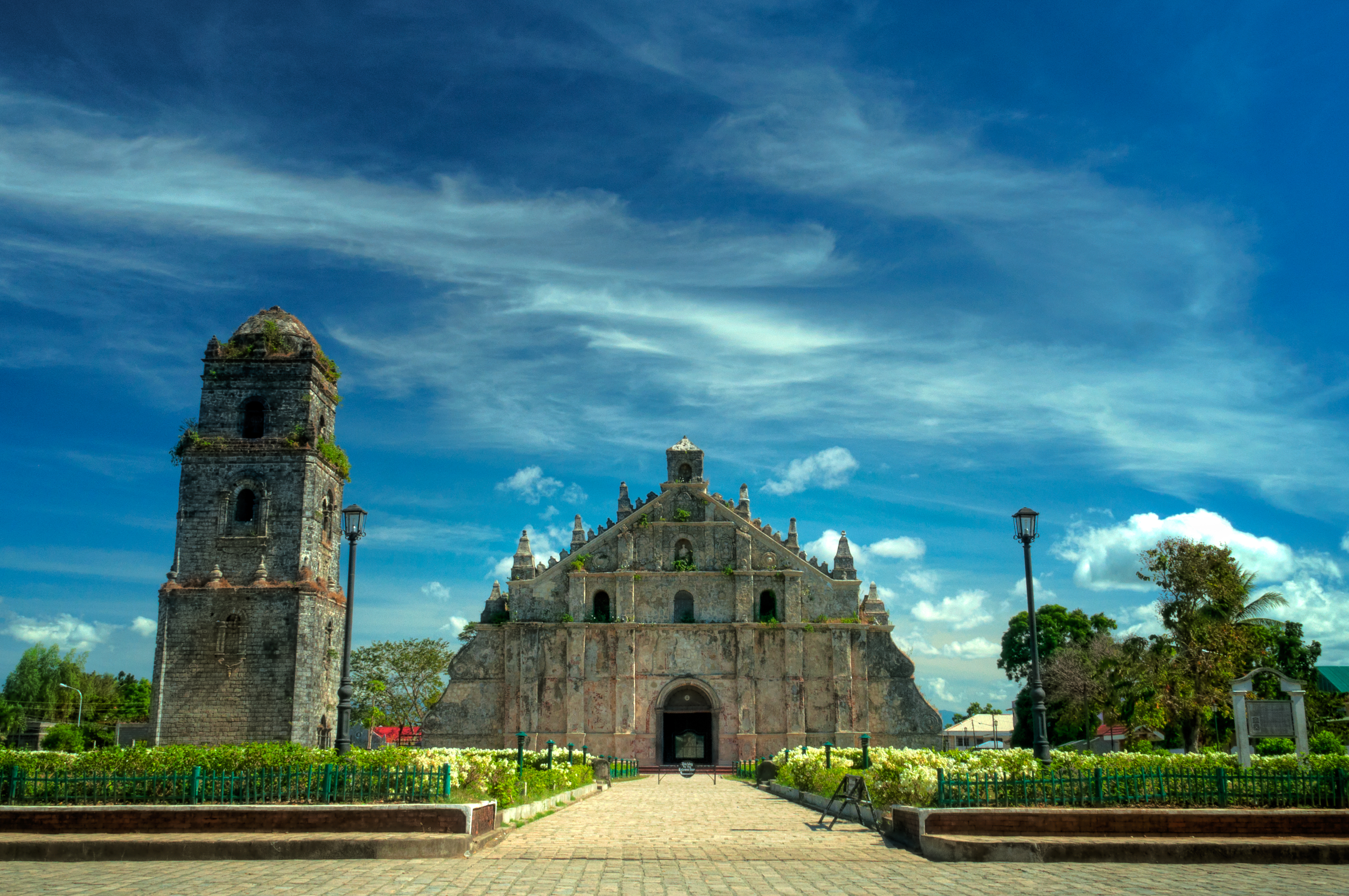
Saint Augustine Catholic Church in Paoay

=== Religion ===
Like most of the Philippines, the major religion in Luzon is Christianity, with Roman Catholicism being the major denomination. Religions rooted in Christianity represented in Luzon include Jehovah's Witnesses, Protestantism, the Philippine Independent Church (Aglipayans), the Church of Jesus Christ of Latter-day Saints (Mormons), and the Iglesia Ni Cristo ("Church of Christ") religious movement. Indigenous traditions and rituals, though rare, are also present.

There are also sizable communities of Sikhs, Hindus (see Hinduism in the Philippines), Buddhists (see Buddhism in the Philippines), and Muslims (see Islam in the Philippines) in Metro Manila and in other areas (especially urban ones) due to the immigration of people from India (see Indian Filipinos), Japan (see Japanese in the Philippines, Korea (see Koreans in the Philippines), and China (see Chinese Filipinos), as well as other countries to the Philippines.

The Bangsamoro people, a Muslim people of native Filipino descent (Islam was introduced to them from Borneo and Malaya in the 14th century) also have a presence on Luzon.

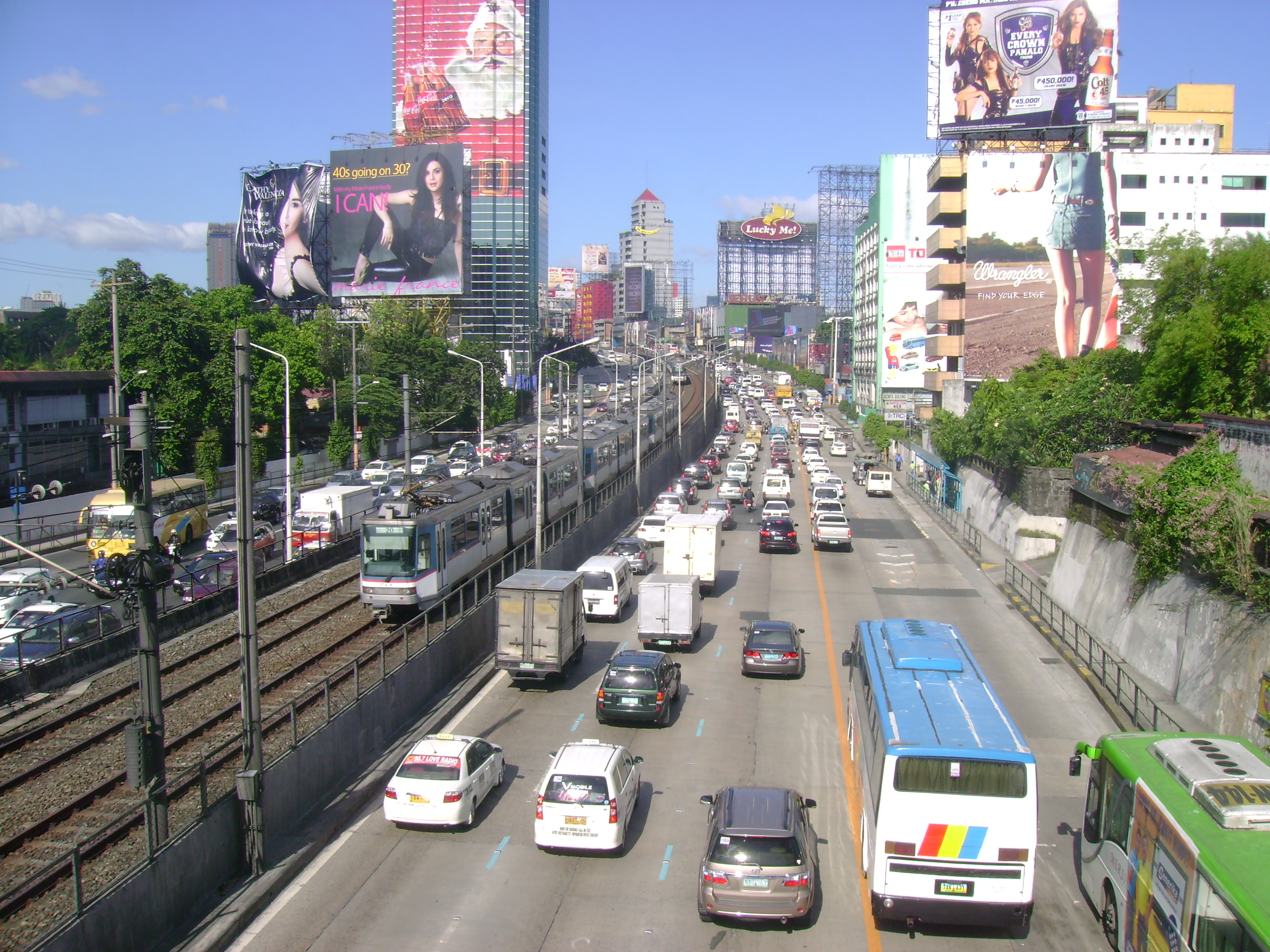
EDSA, a major thoroughfare in Metro Manila

== Economy ==
The economy of the island is centered in Metro Manila with Makati serving as the main economic and financial hub. Major companies such as Ayala, Jollibee Foods Corporation, SM Group, and Metrobank are based in the business hubs of Makati Central Business District, Ortigas Center, and Bonifacio Global City. Industry is concentrated in and around the urban areas of Metro Manila while agriculture predominates in the other regions of the island producing crops such as rice, bananas, mangoes, coconuts, pineapple, and coffee. Other sectors include livestock raising, tourism, mining, and fishing.

=== Air transport ===
The island is served by the main international airports:

- Ninoy Aquino International Airport (serving Manila). In 2024, NAIA served more than 50 million passengers, 47% more than the previous year and an all-time record high, making it the busiest airport in the Philippines, the 17th busiest in Asia, and the 38th busiest in the world.
- Clark International Airport (serving Clark)

There are also other airports in the island serving domestic air services which are:

- Bicol International Airport (serving Legazpi)
- Cauayan Airport (serving Cauayan)
- Laoag International Airport (serving Ilocos Norte)
- Naga Airport (serving Naga)
- Puerto Princesa International Airport (serving Puerto Princesa)
- Tuguegarao Airport (serving Tuguegarao)

== See also ==
- Regions of the Philippines
- Provinces of the Philippines
- Battle of Luzon
