= Araceli, Palawan =

Municipality in Palawan, Philippines

Araceli
- Municipality
- Municipality of Araceli
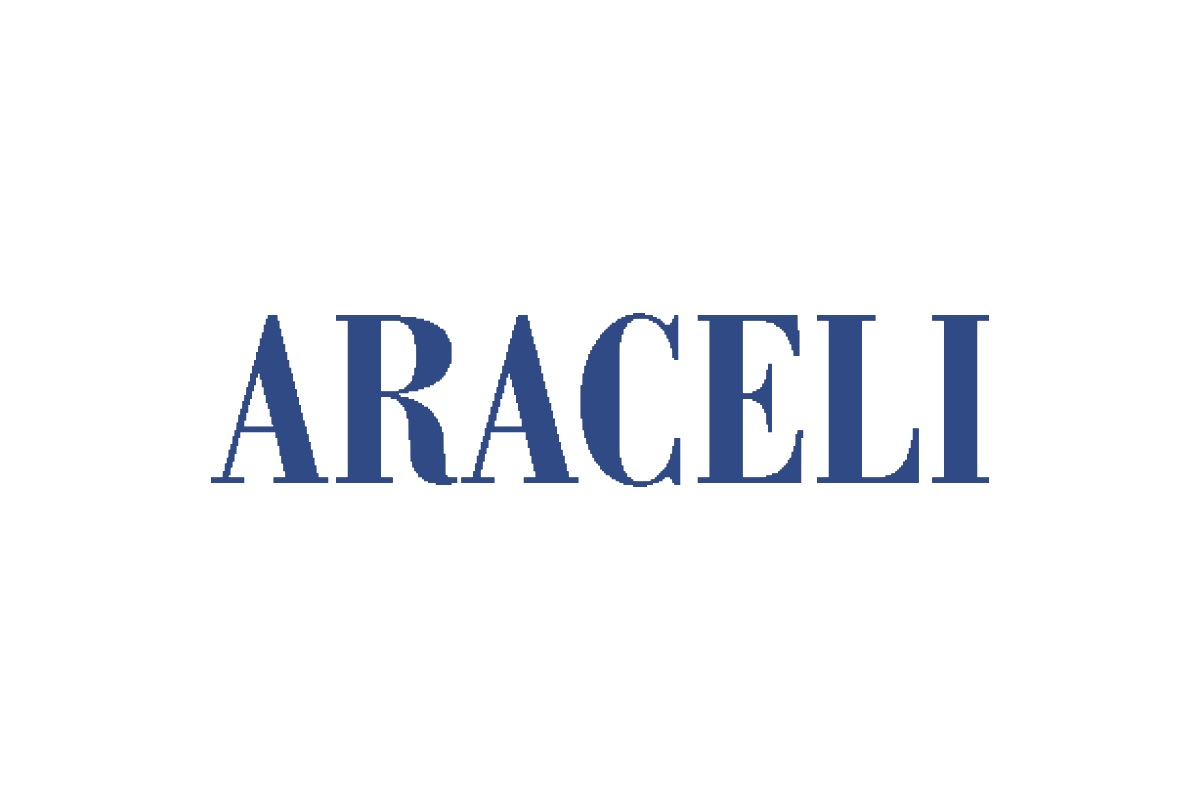
- Flag

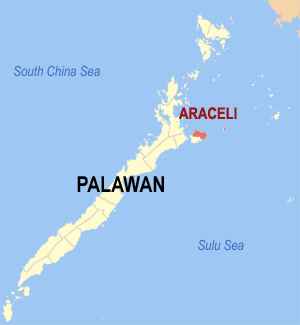
- Map of Palawan with Araceli highlighted
- Interactive map of Araceli
- Location within the Philippines
- Coordinates: 10°33′10″N 119°59′25″E
- Country: Philippines
- Region: Mimaropa
- Province: Palawan
- District: 1st district
- Founded: June 15, 1954
- Barangays: 13 (see Barangays)

Government
  - Type: Sangguniang Bayan
  - Mayor: Sue S. Cudilla
  - Vice Mayor: Rafael V. Abiog
  - Representative: Rosalie Salvame
  - Municipal Council: Members: Romeo S. Gandola; Lucibar A. Beronio Jr.; Rafael V. Abiog; Antonio S. Daculap; Elvin G. Batiancila; Arcelito P. Manongsong; Ami R. Rodriguez; Reymond C. Gadiano
  - Electorate: 9,735 voters (2025)

Area
  - Total: 204.30 km^{2} (78.88 sq mi)
- Elevation: 11 m (36 ft)
- Highest elevation: 160 m (520 ft)
- Lowest elevation: 0 m (0 ft)

Population (2024 census)
  - Total: 14,554
  - Density: 71.238/km^{2} (184.51/sq mi)
  - Households: 3,505

Economy
  - Income class: 3rd municipal income class
  - Poverty incidence: 24.26% (2023)
  - Revenue: ₱ 142.3 million (2024)
  - Assets: ₱ 410.6 million (2024)
  - Expenditure: ₱ 123.2 million (2024)
  - Liabilities: ₱ 214.3 million (2024)

Service provider
  - Electricity: Palawan Electric Cooperative (PALECO)
- Time zone: UTC+8 (PST)
- ZIP code: 5311
- PSGC: 1705303000
- IDD : area code: +63 (0)48
- Native languages: Palawano; Cuyonon; Tagalog

Araceli, officially the Municipality of Araceli (Tagalog: Bayan ng Araceli), is a municipality in the province of Palawan, Philippines. According to the 2024 census, it has a population of 14,554 people.

The municipality covers roughly the northern half of Dumaran Island. Cuyono is the principal language of the area.

== Etymology ==
The town's Catholic parish is Nuestra Señora de Araceli, a Spanish term that can be translated to "Our Lady of Altar of the Sky" (from ara, meaning altar; and celi, meaning sky).

== History ==
=== Spanish era ===
During Spanish times, Araceli was formerly known as Dumaran.

=== World War II ===
In October 1944, Japanese forces landed on Araceli. Guerrilla forces retreated to the mountains and established fortifications with tunnels and barbed wires to resist the invading force. These guerrillas were led by Guerrilla Mayor Louis Dawson and Vice Mayor Donato Negosa. In February 1945 however, Japanese forces evacuated to concentrate their forces into mainland Palawan to prepare for the defense against the American landing.

=== Modern era ===
Dumaran was renamed Araceli on June 15, 1954. In 1961, barrios Dumaran, Bacao, Bohol, Calasag, and San Juan were excised from Araceli to form part of the new municipality of Dumaran, effective upon the election of its new municipal officials later that year.

== Geography ==
=== Barangays ===
Araceli is politically subdivided into 15 barangays. Each barangay consists of puroks and some have sitios.

- Balogo
- Calandagan (formerly Tudela)
- Dagman
- Dalayawon
- Lumacad
- Madoldolon
- Mauringuen
- Omulan
- Osmeña
- Poblacion (Centro)
- San Jose De Oro
- Santo Niño
- Taloto
- Tiemad
- Tinintinan

=== Climate ===
Climate data for Araceli, Palawan
Month	Jan	Feb	Mar	Apr	May	Jun	Jul	Aug	Sep	Oct	Nov	Dec	Year
Mean daily maximum °C (°F)	29 (84)	30 (86)	30 (86)	31 (88)	31 (88)	30 (86)	29 (84)	30 (86)	29 (84)	29 (84)	29 (84)	29 (84)	30 (85)
Mean daily minimum °C (°F)	23 (73)	23 (73)	23 (73)	24 (75)	25 (77)	25 (77)	25 (77)	24 (75)	24 (75)	24 (75)	24 (75)	24 (75)	24 (75)
Average precipitation mm (inches)	45 (1.8)	34 (1.3)	62 (2.4)	64 (2.5)	127 (5.0)	159 (6.3)	172 (6.8)	147 (5.8)	167 (6.6)	182 (7.2)	172 (6.8)	88 (3.5)	1,419 (56)
Average rainy days	12.1	9.4	13.0	14.3	22.7	26.9	28.0	26.4	27.0	27.0	22.7	17.8	247.3
Source: Meteoblue

== Demographics ==
Population census of Araceli

Year	Pop.	±% p.a.
1903	2,146	—
1960	4,955	+1.48%
1970	4,444	−1.08%
1975	5,552	+4.57%
1980	6,030	+1.66%
1990	8,708	+3.74%
1995	10,556	+3.67%

Year	Pop.	±% p.a.
2000	10,894	+0.68%
2007	13,233	+2.72%
2010	14,113	+2.37%
2015	14,909	+1.05%
2020	14,434	−0.68%
2024	14,554	+0.20%

Source: Philippine Statistics Authority

In the 2024 census, the population of Araceli was 14,554 people, with a density of 71 inhabitants per square kilometer or 180 inhabitants per square mile.

== Economy ==
Poverty incidence of Araceli

Source: Philippine Statistics Authority

== Education ==
The Araceli Schools District Office governs all educational institutions within the municipality. It oversees the management and operations of all private and public, from primary to secondary schools.

=== Primary and elementary schools ===
- Araceli Central School
- Araceli North Central School
- Baing Elementary School
- Balogo Elementary School
- Bolocot Elementary School
- Calandagan Elementary School
- Dagman Elementary School
- Dalayawan Elementary School
- Lumacad Elementary School
- Maducang Elementary School
- Madoldolon Elementary School
- Mauriguen Elementary School
- Osmeña Elementary School
- San Felipe Elementary School
- San Jose De Oro Elementary School
- Sto Niño Elementary School
- Taloto Elementary School
- Tinintinan Elementary School

=== Secondary schools ===
- Araceli National High School
- Araceli Plainview National High School
- Araceli Western National High School
- Calandagan National High School
