= Dumaran Island =

Island in the Philippines

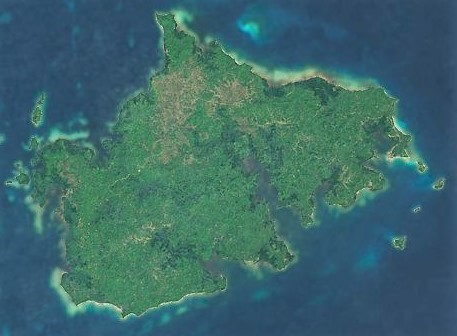
- Dumaran island satellite image captured by Sentinel-2 in 2016

- Location within Philippines

Geography
- Coordinates: 10°31′48″N 119°50′44″E
- Adjacent to: Sulu Sea
- Area: 322 km^{2} (124 sq mi)
- Highest elevation: 127 m (417 ft)
- Highest point: Mount Magogpong

Administration
- Philippines
- Region: Mimaropa
- Province: Palawan
- Municipalities: Araceli; Dumaran

Additional information

Dumaran Island is an island in the province of Palawan in the Philippines. It is around 2.70 kilometers (1.68 mi) away from mainland Palawan at its closest point and is accessible by pump boats. The island is administratively divided between the municipalities of Dumaran and Araceli. Both municipalities' poblacions are located on the island. Dumaran Channel can be found west of the island. The Dalanganem islands can be found northeast of Dumaran.

== Dumaran Bay ==
Dumaran Bay is located on the western part of the island. This is a list of structures and places there:

- San Juan Bautista Catholic Church
- Damuran Public Market
- Castro Inn
- Cayao Lodging House

== Wasao ==
Maraneg Beach is in the southern portion of Wasao. It is said to have grayish-beige sand surrounded by forest. Red seaweed and coral is a common find to be washed up along the beach.

== Wonol ==
Wonol is a peninsula located in the mid south region of the island

== Fauna ==
Dumaran's fauna includes the Philippine cockatoo and the endangered Philippine pond turtle. The damselfish Pomacentrus tripunctatus can be found here.
