= History of the Philippines =

The history of the Philippines dates from the earliest hominin activity in the archipelago at least by 709,000 years ago. Homo luzonensis, a species of archaic humans, was present on the island of Luzon at least by 134,000 years ago. The earliest known anatomically modern human was from Tabon Caves in Palawan dating about 47,000 years. Negrito groups were the first inhabitants to settle in the prehistoric Philippines. These were followed by Austroasiatics, Papuans, and Austronesians. By around 3000 BCE, seafaring Austronesians, who form the majority of the current population, migrated southward from Taiwan.

Scholars generally believe that these ethnic and social groups eventually developed into various settlements or polities with varying degrees of economic specialization, social stratification, and political organization. Some of these settlements (mostly those located on major river deltas) achieved such a scale of social complexity that some scholars believe they should be considered early states. This includes the predecessors of modern-day population centers such as Manila, Tondo, Pangasinan, Cebu, Panay, Bohol, Butuan, Cotabato, Lanao, Zamboanga, and Sulu as well as some polities, such as Ma-i, whose possible location is either Mindoro or Laguna. These polities were influenced by Islamic, Indian, and Chinese cultures. Islam arrived from Arabia, while Indian Hindu-Buddhist religion, language, culture, literature, and philosophy arrived from the Indian subcontinent. Some polities were Sinified tributary states allied to China. These small maritime states flourished from the 1st millennium. These kingdoms traded with what are now called China, India, Japan, Thailand, Vietnam, and Indonesia. The remainder of the settlements were independent barangays allied with one of the larger states. These small states alternated from being part of or being influenced by larger Asian empires such as the Ming dynasty, Majapahit, and Brunei or rebelling and waging war against them.

The first recorded visit by Europeans is Ferdinand Magellan's expedition, which landed in Homonhon Island, now part of Guiuan, Eastern Samar, on March 16, 1521. They lost a battle against the army of Lapulapu, chief of Mactan, where Magellan was killed. The Spanish Philippines began with the Pacific expansion of New Spain and the arrival of Miguel López de Legazpi's expedition on February 13, 1565, from Mexico. He established the first permanent settlement in Cebu. Much of the archipelago came under Spanish rule, creating the first unified political structure known as the Philippines, named after King Philip II. Spanish colonial rule saw the introduction of Christianity, the code of law, and the oldest modern university in Asia. The Philippines was ruled under the Mexico-based Viceroyalty of New Spain. After this, the colony was directly governed by Spain, following Mexico's independence.

Spanish rule ended in 1898 with Spain's defeat in the Spanish–American War. The Philippines then became a territory of the United States. U.S. forces suppressed a revolution led by Emilio Aguinaldo. The United States established the Insular Government to rule the Philippines. In 1907, the elected Philippine Assembly was set up with popular elections. The U.S. promised independence in the Jones Act. The Philippine Commonwealth was established in 1935, as a 10-year interim step prior to full independence. However, in 1942 during World War II, Japan occupied the Philippines. The U.S. military overpowered the Japanese in 1945. The Treaty of Manila in 1946 established the independent Philippine Republic.

== Timeline ==
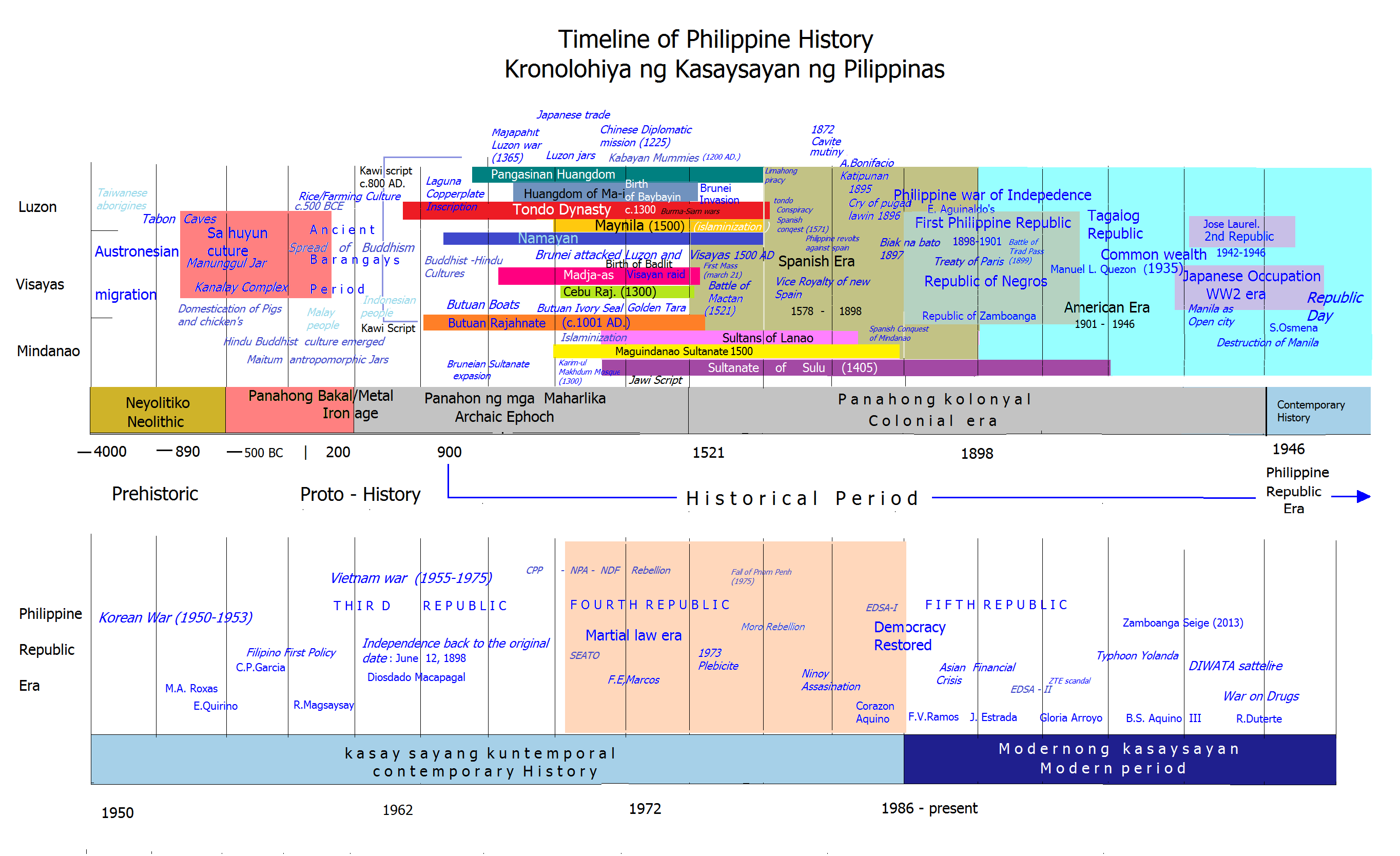

== Prehistory ==
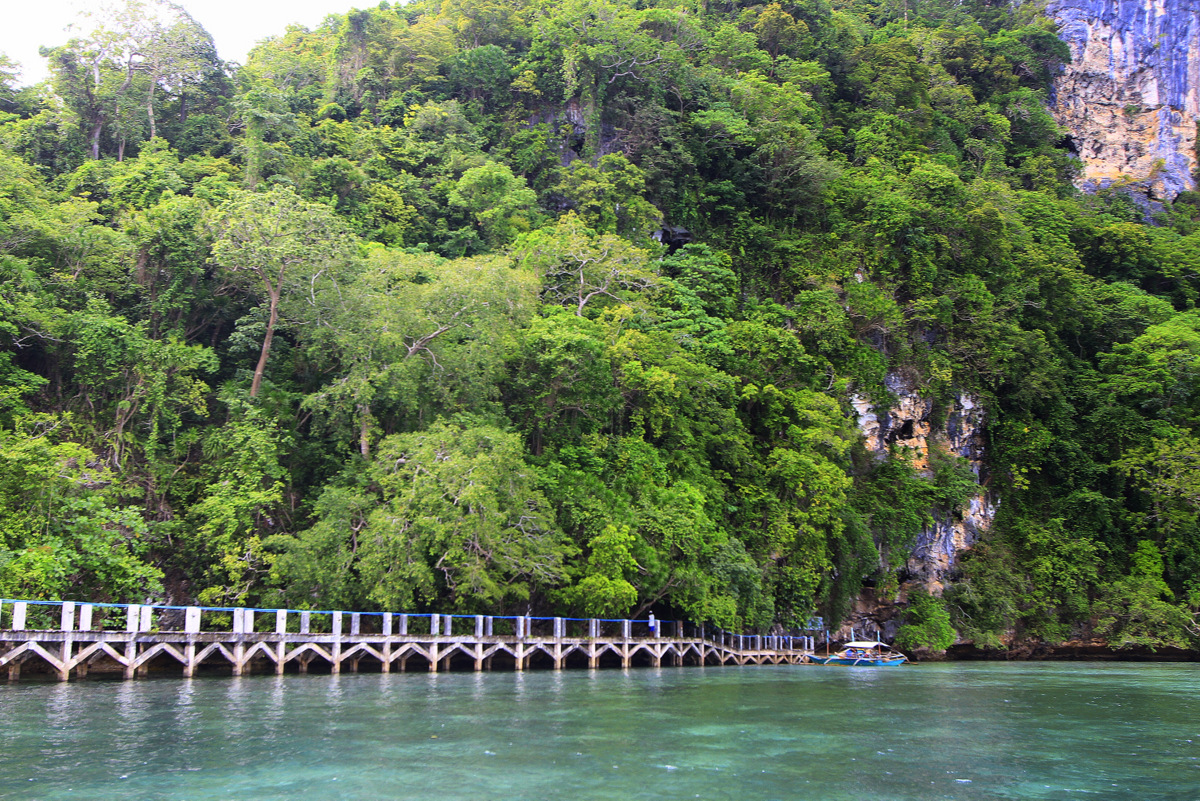
Docking station and entrance to the Tabon Cave Complex Site in Palawan, where one of the oldest human remains was located.

Stone tools and fossils of butchered animal remains discovered in Rizal, Kalinga are evidence of human presence as early as 709,000 years ago. Researchers found 57 stone tools near rhinoceros bones bearing cut marks and some bones smashed open, suggesting that the early humans consumed the nutrient-rich marrow. A 2023 study dated the age of fossilized remains of Homo luzonensis of Cagayan at about 134,000 years.

This and the Angono Petroglyphs in Rizal suggest the presence of human settlement before the arrival of the Negritos and the Austronesian-speaking peoples. The Callao Man remains and 12 bones of three hominin individuals found by subsequent excavations in Callao Cave were later identified to belong in a new species named Homo luzonensis. For modern humans, the Tabon Man remains are the still oldest known at about 47,000 years.

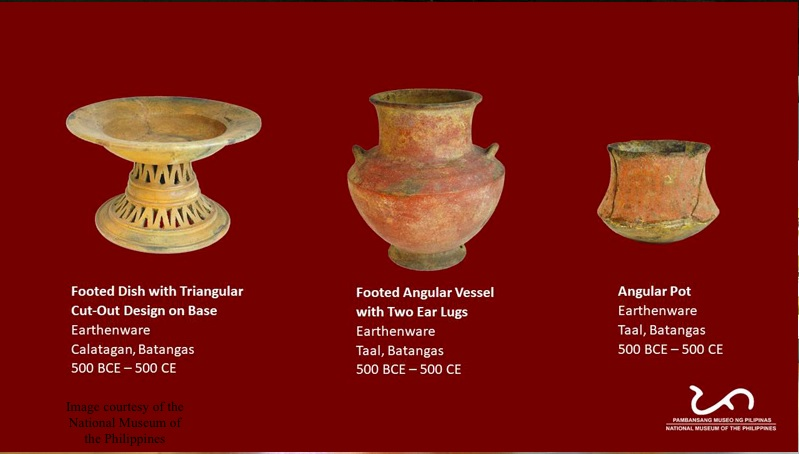
A Developed Prehistoric Pottery Complex existed at the Philippines from as early as 500 BCE.

The Negritos were early settlers, but their appearance in the Philippines has not been reliably dated. They were followed by speakers of the Malayo-Polynesian languages, a branch of the Austronesian language family. The first Austronesians reached the Philippines at 3000–2200 BCE, settling the Batanes Islands and northern Luzon.

From there, they rapidly spread downwards to the rest of the islands of the Philippines and Southeast Asia, as well as voyaging further east to reach the Northern Mariana Islands by around 1500 BCE. They assimilated the earlier Australo-Melanesian Negritos, resulting in the modern Filipino ethnic groups that all display various ratios of genetic admixture between Austronesian and Negrito groups. Before the expansion out of Taiwan, archaeological, linguistic, and genetic evidence had linked Austronesian speakers in Insular Southeast Asia to cultures such as the Hemudu in Neolithic China, its successor the Liangzhu, and the Dapenkeng in Neolithic Taiwan.

The most widely accepted theory of the population of the islands is the "Out-of-Taiwan" model that follows the Austronesian expansion during the Neolithic in a series of maritime migrations originating from Taiwan that spread to the islands of the Indo-Pacific; ultimately reaching as far as New Zealand, Easter Island, and Madagascar. Austronesians themselves originated from the Neolithic rice-cultivating pre-Austronesian civilizations of the Yangtze River delta in coastal southeastern China pre-dating the conquest of those regions by the Han Chinese.

This includes civilizations like the Liangzhu, Hemudu, and Majiabang cultures. It connects speakers of the Austronesian languages in a common linguistic and genetic lineage, including the Taiwanese indigenous peoples, Islander Southeast Asians, Chams, Islander Melanesians, Micronesians, Polynesians, and the Malagasy people. Aside from language and genetics, they also share common cultural markers like multihull and outrigger boats, tattooing, rice cultivation, wetland agriculture, teeth blackening, jade carving, betel nut chewing, ancestor worship, and the same domesticated plants and animals (including dogs, pigs, chickens, yams, bananas, sugarcane, and coconuts).

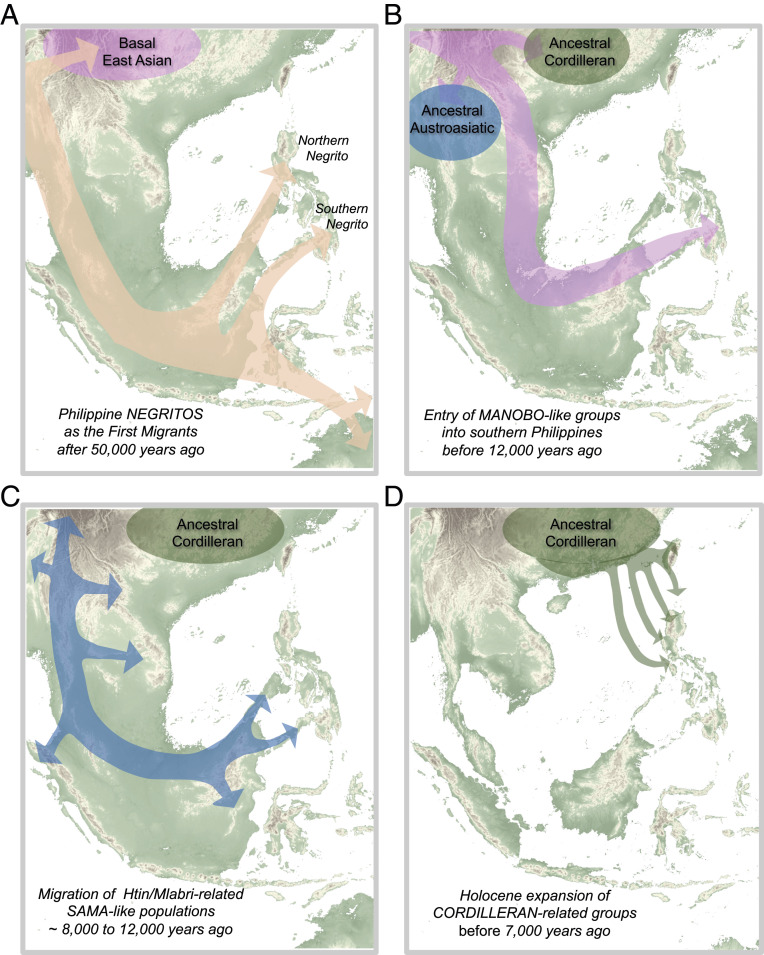
The multiple waves of immigration the Philippines received, before the Protohistoric period.

A 2021 genetic study examining representatives of 115 indigenous communities found evidence of at least five independent waves of early human migration. Negrito groups, divided between those in Luzon and those in Mindanao, may come from a single wave and diverged subsequently, or through two separate waves. This likely occurred sometime after 46,000 years ago. Another Negrito migration entered Mindanao sometime after 25,000 years ago. Two early East Asian waves were detected, one most strongly evidenced among the Manobo people who live in inland Mindanao, and the other in the Sama-Bajau and related people of the Sulu archipelago, Zamboanga Peninsula, and Palawan. The admixture found in the Sama people indicates a relationship with the Htin and Mlabri people of mainland Southeast Asia, both peoples being speakers of an Austroasiatic language and reflects a similar genetic signal found in western Indonesia. These happened sometime after 15,000 years ago and 12,000 years ago respectively, around the time the last glacial period was coming to an end. Austronesians, either from Southern China or Taiwan, were found to have come in at least two distinct waves. The first, occurring perhaps between 10,000 and 7,000 years ago, brought the ancestors of indigenous groups that today live around the Cordillera Central mountain range. Later migrations brought other Austronesian groups, along with agriculture, and the languages of these recent Austronesian migrants effectively replaced those existing populations. In all cases, new immigrants appear to have mixed to some degree with existing populations. The integration of Southeast Asia into Indian Ocean trading networks around 2,000 years ago also shows some impact, with South Asian genetic signals present within some Sama-Bajau communities. There is also some Papuan migration to Southeast Mindanao as Papuan genetic signatures were detected in the Sangil and Blaan ethnic groups.

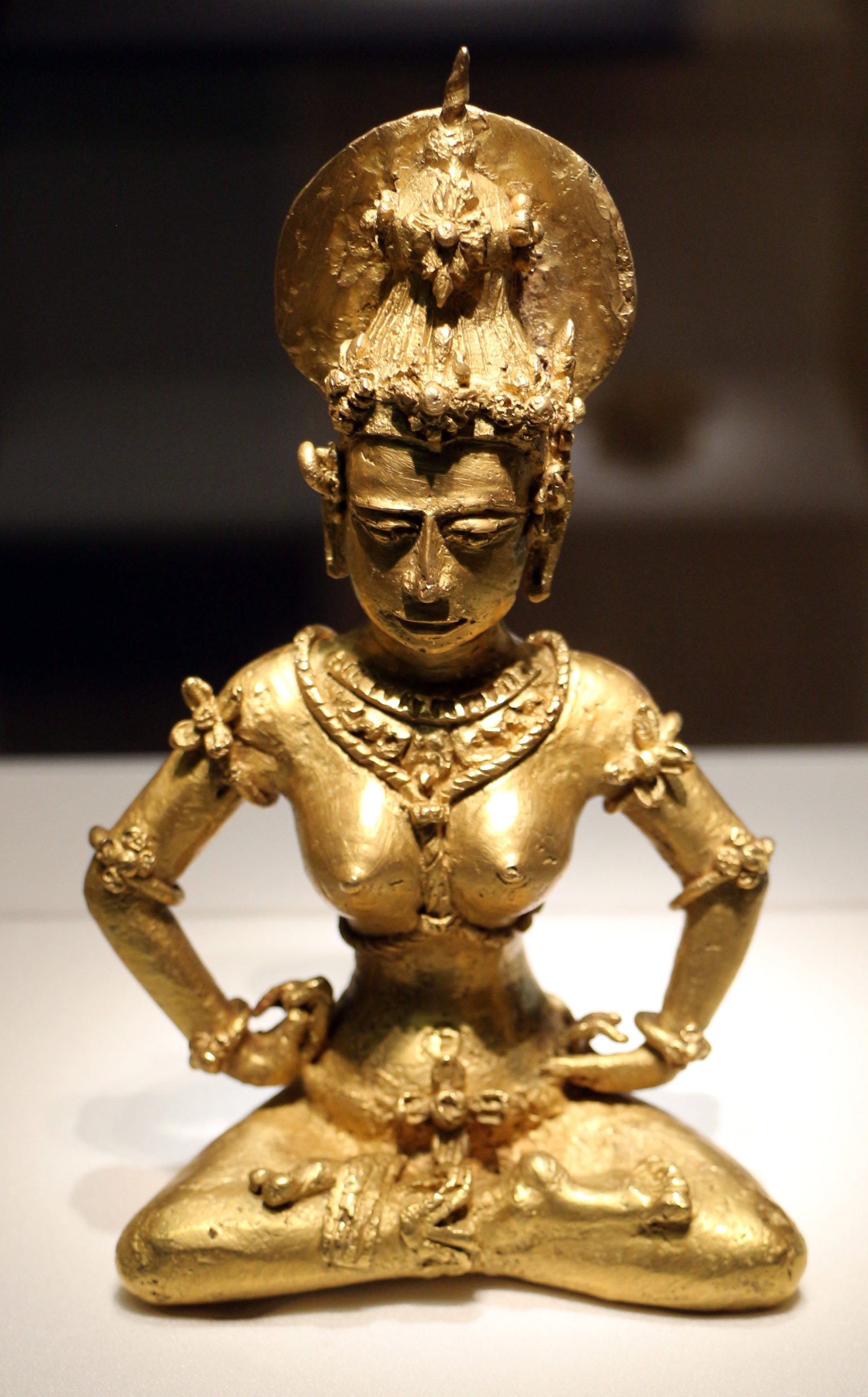
A gold statue of the Hindu-Buddhist goddess (Devata) "Tara" found in southern Philippines showing the incipient adoption of Hinduism and Buddhism, from India and China.

By 1000 BCE, the inhabitants of the Philippine archipelago had developed into four distinct kinds of peoples: tribal groups, such as the Aetas, Hanunoo, Ilongots, and the Mangyan who depended on hunter-gathering and were concentrated in forests; warrior societies, such as the Isneg and Kalinga who practiced social ranking and ritualized warfare and roamed the plains; the petty plutocracy of the Ifugao Cordillera Highlanders, who occupied the mountain ranges of Luzon; and the harbor principalities of the estuarine civilizations that grew along rivers and seashores while participating in trans-island maritime trade. It was also during the first millennium BCE that early metallurgy was said to have reached the archipelagos of maritime Southeast Asia via trade with India.

Around 300–700 CE, the seafaring peoples of the islands traveling in balangays began to trade with the Indianized kingdoms in the Malay Archipelago and the nearby East Asian principalities, adopting influences from both Buddhism and Hinduism.

=== Maritime Jade Road ===
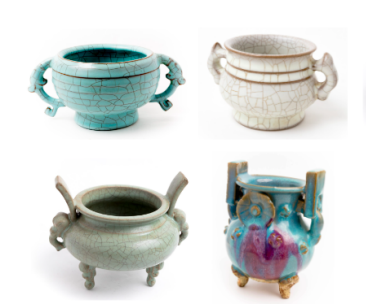
Song Dynasty Era (Year 900s) royal Porcelain-ware found in the KPC ("Kalaga (Caraga) Putuan (Butuan) Crescent") Region, Song China considered the Philippines a valuable source of Jade, Gold, Spices, and Incense, that they manufactured specially made Porcelain for the local Philippine kingdoms.

The Maritime Jade Road was initially established by the animist indigenous peoples between the Philippines and Taiwan, and later expanded to cover Vietnam, Malaysia, Indonesia, Thailand, and other countries. Artifacts made from white and green nephrite have been discovered at a number of archeological excavations in the Philippines since the 1930s. The artifacts have been both tools like adzes and chisels, and ornaments such as lingling-o earrings, bracelets, and beads. Tens of thousands were found in a single site in Batangas. The jade is said to have originated nearby in Taiwan and is also found in many other areas in insular and mainland Southeast Asia. These artifacts are said to be evidence of long range communication between prehistoric Southeast Asian societies. Throughout history, the Maritime Jade Road has been known as one of the most extensive sea-based trade networks of a single geological material in the prehistoric world, existing for 3,000 years from 2000 BCE to 1000 CE. The operations of the Maritime Jade Road coincided with an era of near absolute peace which lasted for 1,500 years, from 500 BCE to 1000 CE. During this peaceful pre-colonial period, not a single burial site studied by scholars yielded any osteological proof for violent death. No instances of mass burials were recorded as well, signifying the peaceful situation of the islands. Burials with violent proof were only found from burials beginning in the 15th century, likely due to the newer cultures of expansionism imported from India and China. When the Spanish arrived in the 16th century, they recorded some warlike groups, whose cultures have already been influenced by the imported Indian and Chinese expansionist cultures of the 15th century.

=== The Spice Trade ===
In the Bible and in classical literature, Southeast Asia, including the Philippines, was the origin point of expensive spices used in: preservatives, aromatics, incense, and anointing mixtures, especially used in royal ceremonies and temple rites. Chiefly the Southeast Asian spices of: Cinnamon, Cassia, and Aloes (Agarwood). Which Biblical peoples imported from Southeast Asia including the Philippines, where it was exclusively grown then, due to the climate requirements of said spices.

=== The Sa Huỳnh culture ===
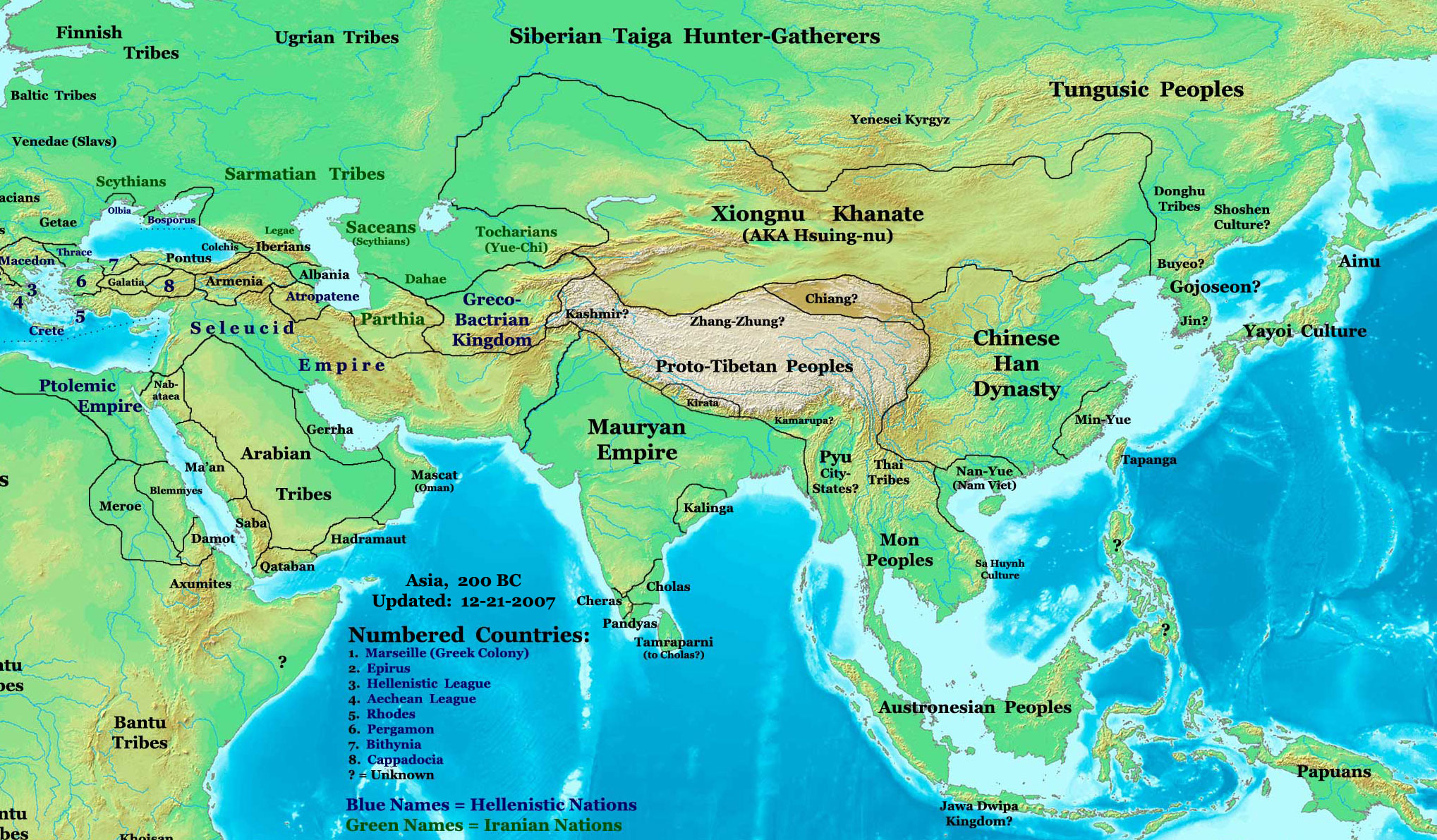
Asia in 200 BCE, showing the Sa Huỳnh culture in Mainland Southeast Asia and the Philippines in transition.

The Sa Huỳnh culture centered on present-day Vietnam, showed evidence of an extensive trade network. Sa Huỳnh beads were made from glass, carnelian, agate, olivine, zircon, gold, and garnet; most of these materials were not local to the region, and were most likely imported. Han dynasty-style bronze mirrors were also found in Sa Huỳnh sites.

Conversely, Sa Huỳnh produced ear ornaments have been found in archaeological sites in Central Thailand, Taiwan (Orchid Island), and in the Philippines, in the Palawan, Tabon Caves. One of the great examples is the Kalanay Cave in Masbate; the artefacts on the site in one of the "Sa Huỳnh-Kalanay" pottery complex sites were dated 400BCE–1500 CE. The Maitum anthropomorphic pottery in the Sarangani Province of southern Mindanao is c. 200 CE.

Ambiguity of what is Sa Huỳnh culture puts into question its extent of influence in Southeast Asia. Sa Huỳnh culture is characterized by use of cylindrical or egg-shaped burial jars associated with hat-shaped lids. Using its mortuary practice as a new definition, Sa Huỳnh culture should be geographically restricted across Central Vietnam between Hue City in the north and Nha Trang City in the south. Recent archeological research reveals that the potteries in Kalanay Cave are quite different from those of the Sa Huỳnh but strikingly similar to those in Hoa Diem site, Central Vietnam, and Samui Island, Thailand. New estimate dates the artifacts in Kalanay cave to come much later than Sa Huỳnh culture at 200–300 CE. Bio-anthropological analysis of human fossils found also confirmed the colonization of Vietnam by Austronesian people from insular Southeast Asia in, e.g., the Hoa Diem site.

Dates are approximate, consult particular article for details
Prehistoric (or Proto-historic) Iron Age Historic Iron Age

== Precolonial period (AD 900 to 1565) – Independent polities ==
Locations of pre-colonial principalities, polities, kingdoms and sultanates in the Philippine archipelago

Also known to a lesser extent as the Pre-Philippines period, is a pre-unification period characterized by many independent states known as polities each with its own history, cultures, chieftains, and governments distinct from each other. According to sources from Southern Liang, people from the kingdom of Langkasuka in present-day Thailand were wearing cotton clothes made in Luzon, Philippines as early as 516–520 CE. The British Historian Robert Nicholl citing Arab chronicler Al Ya'akubi, had written that on the early years of the 800s, the kingdoms of Muja (then Pagan Brunei) and Mayd (Ma-i) waged war against the Chinese Empire. Medieval Indian scholars also referred to the Philippines as "Panyupayana" (The lands surrounded by water).

By the 1300s, a number of the large coastal settlements had emerged as trading centers, and became the focal point of societal changes. This phase of history can be noted for its highly mobile nature, with barangays transforming from being settlements and turning into fleets and vice versa, with the wood constantly re-purposed according to the situation. Politics during this era was personality-driven and organization was based on shifting alliances and contested loyalties set in a backdrop of constant inter-polity interactions, both through war and peace.

Legendary accounts often mention the interaction of early Philippine polities with Hindu Majapahit empire, but there is not much archaeological evidence to definitively support such a relationship. Considerable evidence exists, on the other hand, for extensive trade with the Srivijaya empire.

The exact scope and mechanisms of Indian cultural influences on early Philippine polities are still the subject of some debate among Southeast Asian historiographers, but the current scholarly consensus is that there was probably little or no direct trade between India and the Philippines, and Indian cultural traits, such as linguistic terms and religious practices, filtered in during the 10th through the early 14th centuries, through early Philippine polities' relations with the Hindu Majapahit empire. The Philippine archipelago is thus one of the countries, just at the outer edge of what is considered the "Greater Indian cultural zone".

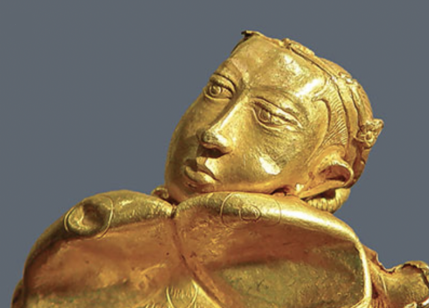
A gold statuette of the Hindu-Buddhist goddess (Devata) "Kinari" found in the Caraga region of the Philippines showing that conforming to ancient records, the area was ruled by Hindu Rajahs.

The early polities of the Philippine archipelago were typically characterized by a three-tier social structure. Although different cultures had different terms to describe them, this three-tier structure invariably consisted of an apex nobility class, a class of "freemen", and a class of dependent debtor-bondsmen called." Among the members of the nobility class were leaders who held the political office of which was responsible for leading autonomous social groups called. Whenever these banded together, either to form a larger settlement or a geographically looser alliance group, the more senior or respected among them would be recognized as a "paramount datu", variedly called a Lakan, Sultan, Rajah, or simply a more senior Datu. Eventually, by the 14th to 16th century, inter-kingdom warfare escalated and population densities across the archipelago was low.

=== Initial recorded history ===
During the period of the south Indian Pallava dynasty and the north Indian Gupta Empire, Indian culture spread to Southeast Asia and the Philippines that led to the establishment of Indianized kingdoms.

The date inscribed in the oldest Philippine document found so far, the Laguna Copperplate Inscription, is 900 CE. From the details of the document, written in Kawi script, the bearer of a debt, Namwaran, along with his children Lady Angkatan and Bukah, are cleared of a debt by the ruler of Pila and Tondo. It is the earliest document that shows the use of mathematics in precolonial Philippine societies. A standard system of weights and measures is demonstrated by the use of precise measurement for gold, and familiarity with rudimentary astronomy is shown by fixing the precise day within the month in relation to the phases of the moon. From the various Sanskrit terms and titles seen in the document, the culture and society of Manila Bay was that of a Hindu–Old Malay amalgamation, similar to the cultures of Java, Peninsular Malaysia, and Sumatra at the time.

There are no other significant documents from this period of precolonial Philippine society and culture until the Doctrina Christiana of the late 16th century, written at the start of the Spanish period in both native Baybayin script and Spanish. Other artifacts with Kawi script and baybayin were found, such as an Ivory seal from Butuan, dated to the early 10th–14th centuries, and the Calatagan pot with baybayin inscription, dated to not later than early 16th century.

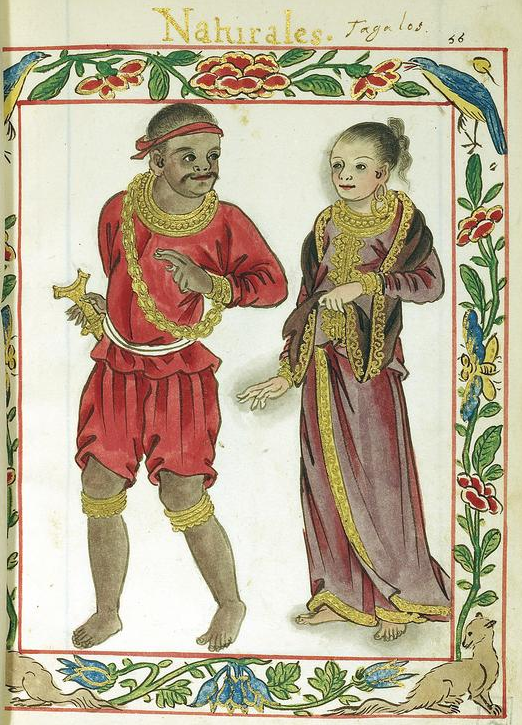
A Boxer Codex image illustrating the 1590s early Spanish colonial period Tagalog Maginoo (noble class).

In the years leading up to 1000, there were already several maritime societies existing in the islands but there was no unifying political state encompassing the entire Philippine archipelago. Instead, the region was dotted by numerous semi-autonomous barangays (settlements ranging in size from villages to city-states) under the sovereignty of competing thalassocracies ruled by datus, wangs, rajahs, sultans or lakans, or by upland agricultural societies like that of the Ifugao and Mangyan. These polities included:

- Pila
- Kingdom of Maynila
- Tondo
- Namayan
- Cainta
- Kumintang
- the Kingdom of Taytay in Palawan (mentioned by Antonio Pigafetta to be where they resupplied when the remaining ships escaped Cebu after Magellan was slain)
- the Chieftaincy of Coron Island ruled by fierce warriors called Tagbanua as reported by Spanish missionaries mentioned by Nilo S. Ocampo,
- Pangasinan
- Caboloan
- Ma-i and its vassal-states of Sandao and Pulilu
- Madja-as
- Bo-ol
- the Hindu kingdoms of Sanmalan, Butuan, and Cebu
- the sultanates of Buayan, Maguindanao, Lanao, and Sulu

Some of these regions were part of the Malayan empires of Majapahit, and Brunei.

=== Tondo ===
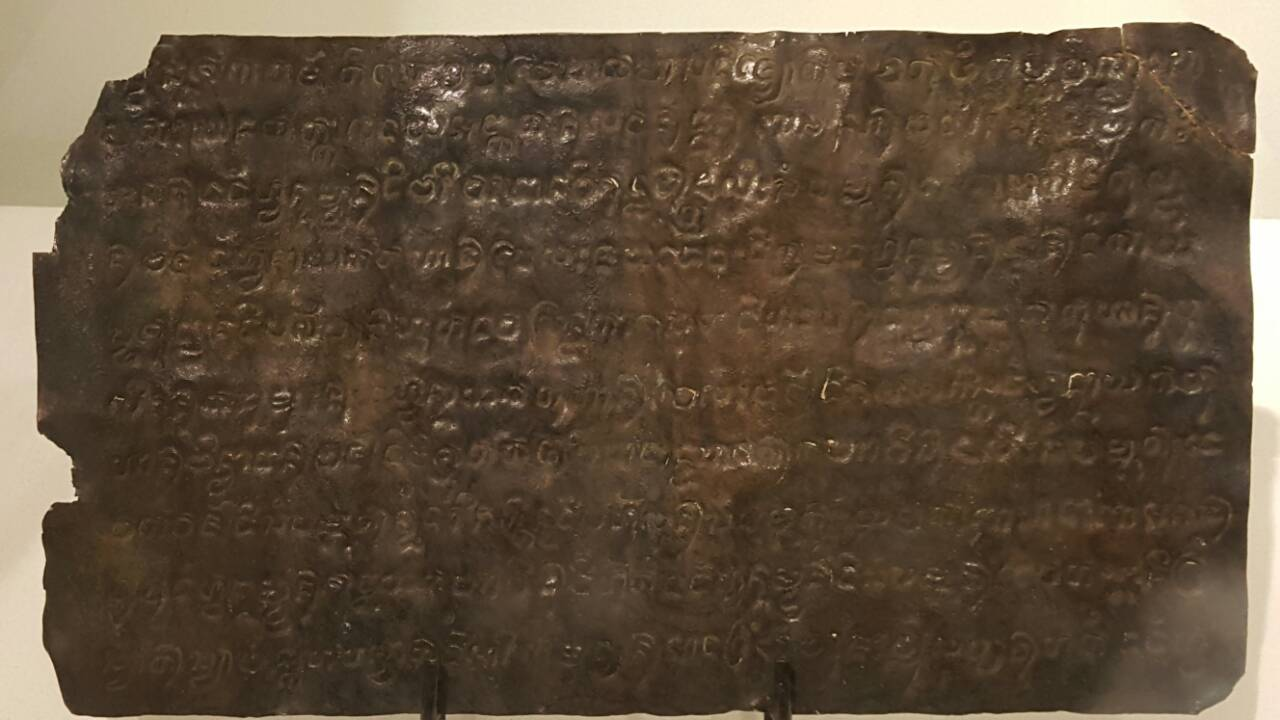
The Laguna Copperplate Inscription, c. 900 CE. The oldest known historical record found in the Philippines, which indirectly refers to the polity of Tondo

Tondo was a major trade hub on Luzon island in the northern part of the Pasig River delta. The earliest historical record of local polities and kingdoms, the Laguna Copperplate Inscription, indirectly refers to the Tagalog polity of Tondo (c. before 900–1589) and two to three other settlements believed to be located somewhere near Tondo, as well as a settlement near Mt. Diwata in Mindanao, and the temple complex of Medang in Java. Although the precise political relationships between these polities is unclear in the text of the inscription, the artifact is usually accepted as evidence of intra- and inter-regional political linkages as early as 900. By the arrival of the earliest European ethnographers during the 1500s, Tondo was led by the paramount ruler called a "Lakan". It had grown into a major trading hub, sharing a monopoly with the Kingdom of Maynila over the trade of Ming dynasty products throughout the archipelago. This trade was significant enough that the Yongle Emperor appointed a Chinese governor named Ko Ch'a-lao to oversee it.

Since at least the year 900, this thalassocracy centered in Manila Bay flourished via an active trade with Chinese, Japanese, Malays, and various other peoples in Asia. Tondo was led by a Lakan who belonged to the caste of the Maginoo, who were the nobility in ancient Tagalog society. The people of Tondo were also good agriculturists, and lived through farming and aquaculture.

In 900 CE, the Lord of Pailah Jayadewa presented a document of debt forgiveness to Lady Angkatan and her brother Bukah, the children of Namwaran. This is described in the Philippines' oldest known document, the Laguna Copperplate Inscription.

=== Cainta ===
Cainta was a fortified upriver polity in present-day Rizal province that occupied both shores of an arm of the Pasig River. The river bisected it in the middle, a moat surrounded its log walls and stone bulwarks armed with native cannons (Lantakas), and the city itself was encased by Bamboo thickets.

=== Namayan ===
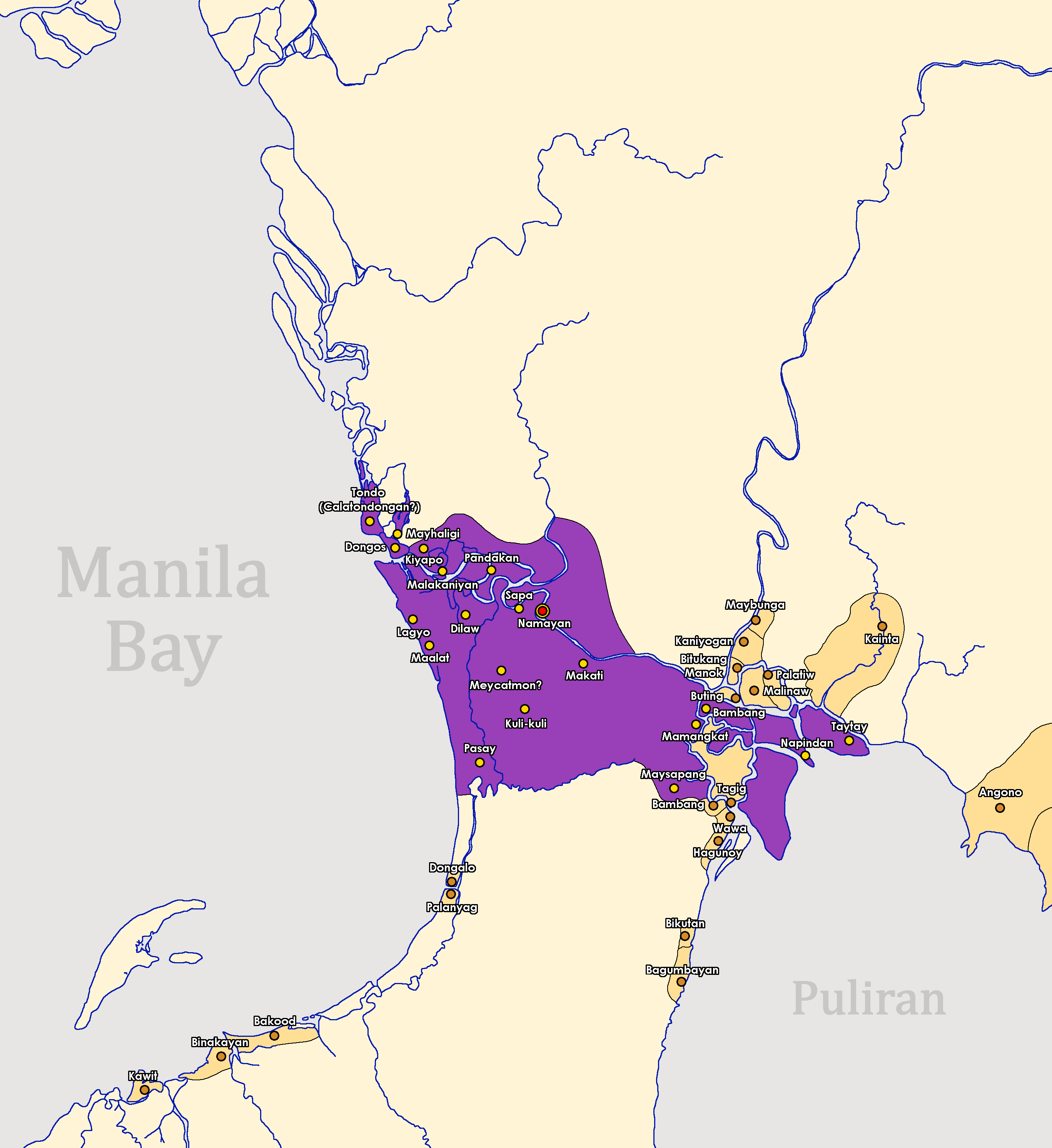
Map of Namayan (pink) under Lakantagkan according to the accounts of Felix Huerta. Calatondongan, Dibag, Pinacauasan and Yamagtogon are missing. Meycatmon's location is unclear.

Namayan, also a Pasig river polity, arose as a confederation of local barangays. Local tradition says that it achieved its peak in the 11th–14th centuries. Archeological findings in Santa Ana have produced the oldest evidence of continuous habitation among the Pasig-river polities, pre-dating artifacts found within the historical sites of Maynila and Tondo.

=== Kumintang ===
Kumintang was a large polity around the Calumpang River in modern-day Batangas. According to local tradition, it was ruled by a legendary figure named Gat Pulintan, who refused to be Christianized and settled to the hills to take refuge and continue resistance against Spanish occupation. It became a Spanish town in 1581 and unofficially renamed as Batangan.

=== Pangasinan ===
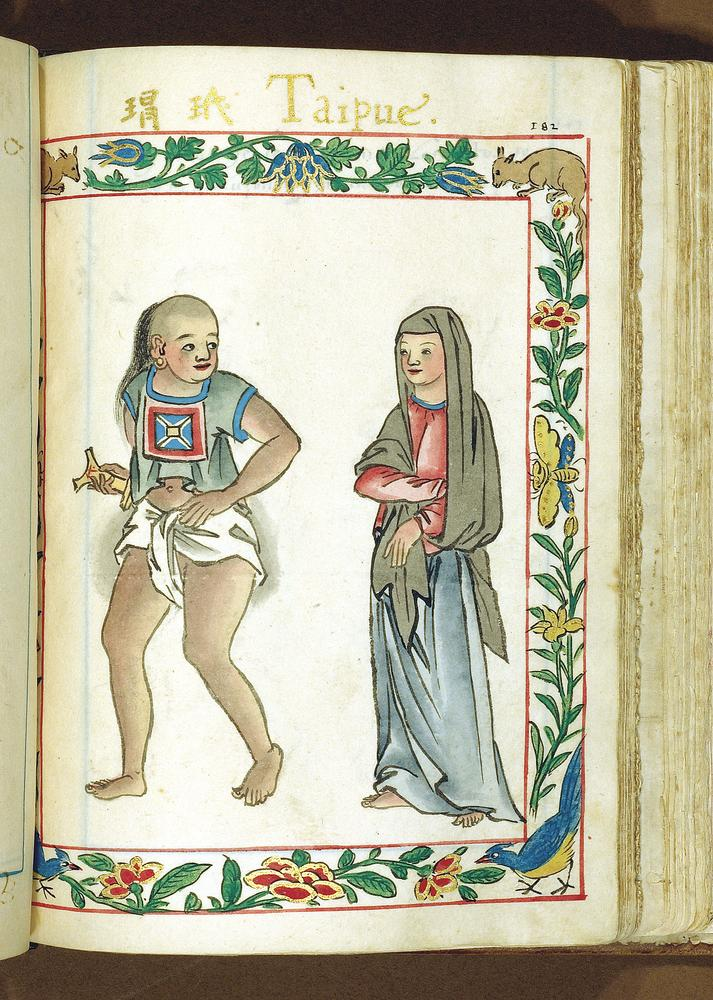
Probable Citizens of the Sinified Wangdom of Pangasinan 漢文 "Feng-chia-hsi-lan", with kampilan sword, shown in the Boxer Codex (1590) surmised to come from Taimei Anchorage, Lingayen Gulf, Luzon

Places in Pangasinan like Lingayen Gulf were mentioned as early as 1225, when Lingayen as known was Li-ying-tung had been listed in Chao Ju-kua's Chu Fan Chih (An account of the various barbarians) as one of the trading places along with Mai (Mindoro or Manila). In northern Luzon, Pangasinan) (c. 1406–1576) sent emissaries to China in 1406–1411 as a tributary-state, and it also traded with Japan. Chinese records of this kingdom, named Feng-chia-hsi-lan (Pangasinan), and was notable for its salt-making industry, began when the first tributary King (Wang in Chinese), Kamayin, sent an envoy offering gifts to the Chinese Emperor. The state occupies the current province of Pangasinan. It flourished around the same period, the Srivijaya and Majapahit empires arose in Indonesia which had extended their influence to much of the Malay Archipelago. Pangasinan enjoyed full independence until the Spanish conquest.

In the sixteenth century Pangasinan was called the "Port of Japan" by the Spanish. The locals wore native apparel typical of other maritime Southeast Asian ethnic groups in addition to Japanese and Chinese silks. Even common people were clad in Chinese and Japanese cotton garments. They also blackened their teeth and were disgusted by the white teeth of foreigners, which were likened to that of animals. Also, used porcelain jars typical of Japanese and Chinese households. Japanese-style gunpowder weapons were also encountered in naval battles in the area. In exchange for these goods, traders from all over Asia would come to trade primarily for gold and slaves, but also for deerskins, civet, and other local products. Other than a notably more extensive trade network with Japan and China, they were culturally similar to other Luzon groups to the south.

=== Ma-i ===
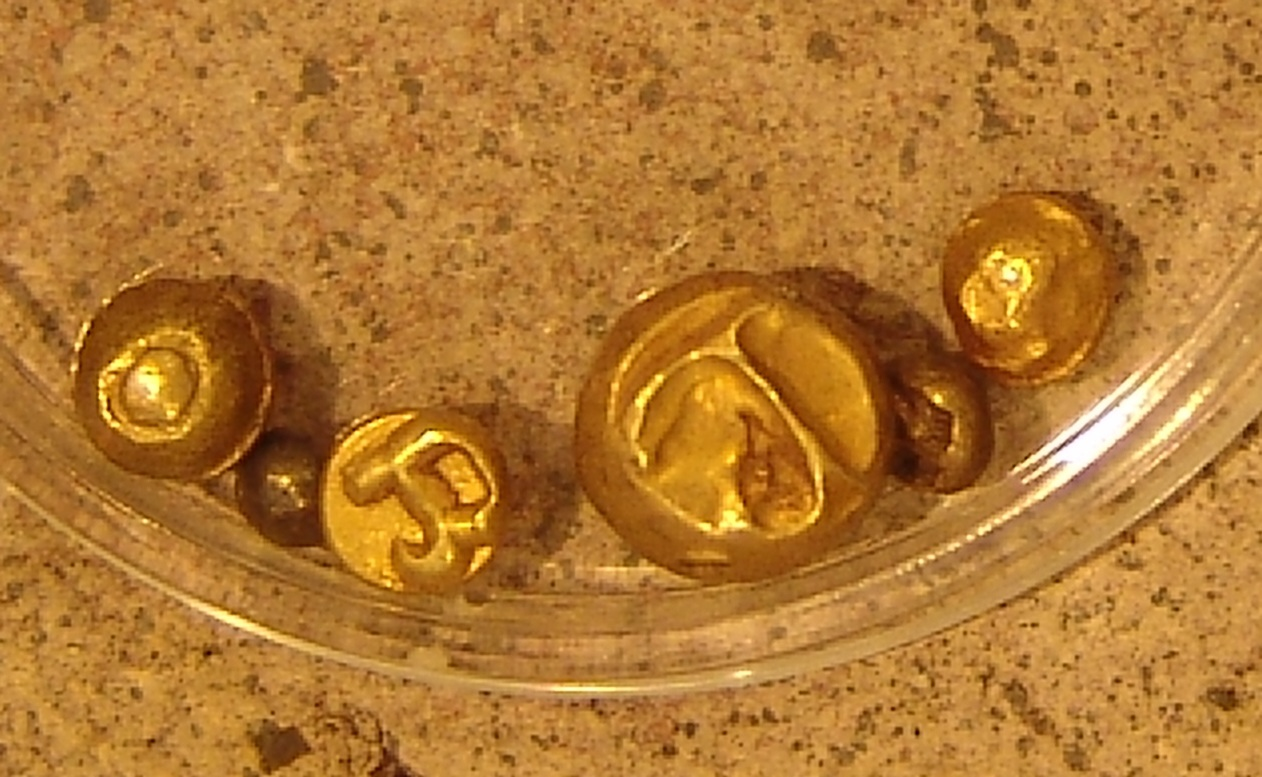
A collection of gold Piloncitos stamped with the Baybayin character for "Ma" possibly representing the nation of Ma-i.

Arab chronicler Al Ya'akubi, had written that in the 800s, the kingdoms of Muja (Then Pagan/Hindu Brunei) and Mayd (Ma-i) militarily competed with the Chinese Empire. Volume 186 of the official history of the Song dynasty describes the polity of Ma-i (c. before 971 – after 1339). Song dynasty traders visited Ma-i annually, and their accounts described Ma-i's geography, trade products, and the trade behaviors of its rulers. Chinese merchants noted that Ma-i's citizens were honest and trustworthy. Because the descriptions of Mai's location in these accounts are unclear, there is dispute about Mai's location, with some scholars believing it was located in Bay, Laguna, and others believing it was on the island of Mindoro. The Buddhist polity traded with Ryukyu and Japan. Chao Jukua, a customs inspector in Fukien province, China wrote the Zhufan Zhi ("Description of the Barbarous Peoples"). William Henry Scott said, that unlike other Philippine kingdoms or polities which needed backing from the Chinese Imperial Court to attract commerce, the Polity of Ma-i was powerful enough to have no need to send tributes to the Chinese throne. According to commercial receipts, Ma-i's industries specialized in the export of "kapok cotton, yellow bees-wax, tortoise shell, medicinal betel nuts, and cloth of various patterns."

=== Sandao ===
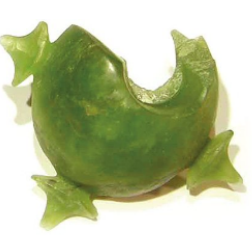
An example of a Jade Lingling-o from Palawan island, Sandao "三嶋", which included Palawan, was a source of high quality carved Jade that was exported towards the markets found westwards of the Philippines.

Sandao "三嶋" in Chinese characters, which was also known as Sanyu (三嶼), was a Prehispanic Filipino nation recorded in Chinese annals as a nation occupying the islands of Jiamayan 加麻延 (present-day Calamian), Balaoyou 巴姥酉 (present-day Palawan), and Pulihuan 蒲裏喚 (near present-day Manila). In the Chinese Gazetteer the Zhufan zhi 諸蕃志 (1225), it was described as a vassal-state of the more powerful nation of Ma-i centered in nearby Mindoro.

=== Pulilu ===
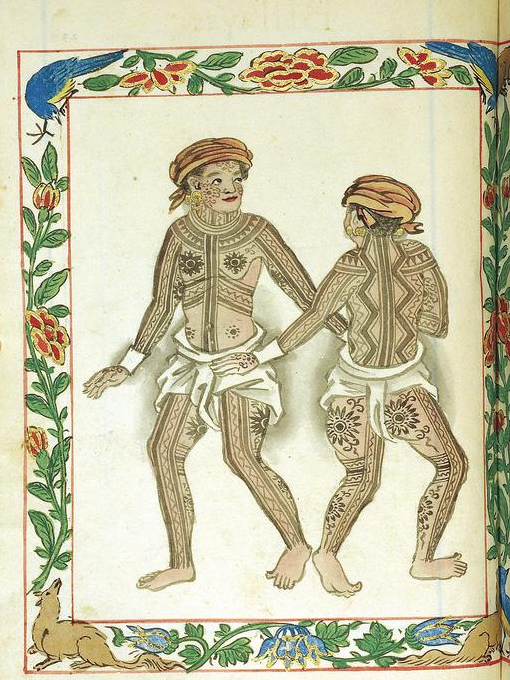
An illustration from the Boxer Codex depicts the war tattoos of Cebuano men, which served as prestigious symbols of bravery. These "Pintados" (painted ones) who were primarily Visayans, of which the people of the Rajahnate of Cebu were the leaders of the alliance, only received tattoos following successes in combat. This tradition links them to the Baiyue of China—a maritime culture celebrated for its warrior spirit and recurring use of dragon and serpent motifs in their body art.

Pulilu was a Prehispanic polity centered at Polillo, Quezon and was mentioned in the Chinese Gazeteer Zhufan zhi 諸蕃志 (1225). It is described as politically connected to the nation of Sandao "三嶋" at the Calamianes which itself was a vassal-state to the larger country of Ma-i "麻逸" centered in Mindoro. Its people were recorded to be warlike, and prone to pillaging and conflict. In this area, the sea is full of coral reefs, which have wavy surfaces that resemble decaying tree trunks or razor blades. Ships going by the reefs must be ready to make sharp maneuvers to avoid them because they are sharper than swords and halberds. Red coral and blue langgan coral are also produced here; however, they are quite difficult to find. It is also similar to the nation of Sandao in local customs and trade products. The chief export of this small polity are rare corals.

=== Visayan belligerence against Imperial China ===
Antonio Pigafetta, the expedition scribe, enumerated the towns and dependencies Cebu had.

Writing in the 13th century, the Chinese historian Chao Ju-Kua mentioned raids conducted by the Pi-sho-ye on the port cities of southern China between A.D. 1174–1190, which he believed came by way of the southern portion of the island of Taiwan. Subsequent historians identified these raiders as Visayans from the Visayas islands while the historian Efren B. Isorena, through analysis of historical accounts and wind currents in the Pacific side of East and Southeast Asia, concluded that said raiders were most likely the people of Ibabao (the precolonial name for the eastern coast and a portion of the northern coast of Samar).

=== Madja-as ===
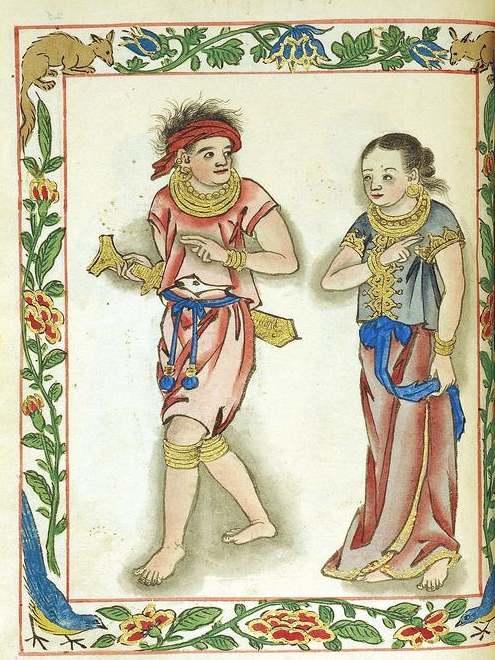
Images from the Boxer Codex illustrating an 1590's early Spanish colonial period kadatuan or tumao (noble class) Visayan couple.

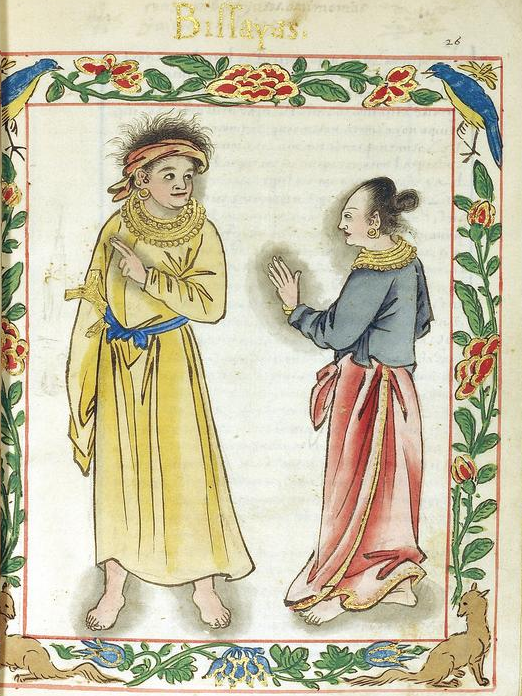
A royal couple of the Visayans.

One theory espoused by some historians is that ten exiled datus of the collapsing empire of Srivijaya led by Datu Puti migrated to the central islands of the Philippines, fleeing from Rajah Makatunaw of the island of Borneo. Upon reaching the island of Panay and purchasing the island from Negrito chieftain Marikudo, they established a confederation of polities and named it Madja-as and they settled the surrounding islands of the Visayas. This is according to Pedro Monetclaro's book Maragtas. However, the actual personage of Rajah Makatunaw was mentioned in earlier Chinese texts about Brunei dating him to 1082, when he was the descendant of Seri Maharaja and he was accompanied by Sang Aji (the ancestor of Sultan Muhammad Shah). There is thus a disparity of dates between the Maragtas Book (based on oral legends) and the Chinese texts. Historian Robert Nicholl also positively identify the pre-Islamic Bruneian Buddhist kingdom of Vijayapura, itself a Bornean tributary of the Srivijaya Empire in Palembang, and in earlier times was a rump state in Sarawak of the fallen Funan Civilization formerly at what is now Cambodia, this was the ancestral homeland of the Visayans of the 10 Datus of Panay. Furthermore, he identified the Rajah Makatunao mentioned in the Maragtas book with Rajah Tugau of the Melano nation centered in Sarawak. Augustinian Friar Rev. Fr. Santaren recorded that Datu Macatunao or Rajah Makatunao who was the "sultan of the Moros," and a relative of Datu Puti who seized the properties and riches of the ten datus was eventually killed by the warriors named Labaodungon and Paybare, using native Filipino and Bornean recruits. This, after learning of this injustice from their father-in-law Paiburong, sailed to Odtojan in Borneo where Makatunaw ruled. The warriors sacked the city, killed Makatunaw and his family, retrieved the stolen properties of the 10 datus, enslaved the remaining population of Odtojan, and sailed back to Panay. Labaw Donggon and his wife, Ojaytanayon, later settled in a place called Moroboro. Afterwards, the datus in Panay, other Visayan islands, and southern Luzon were said to have founded various towns.

=== Cebu (historical polity) ===
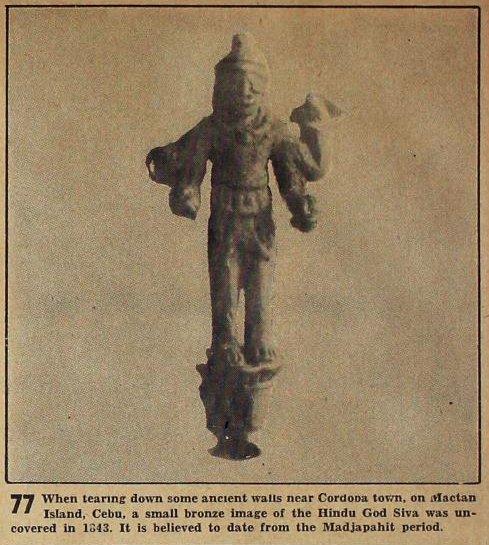
A picture of a Bronze Image of the Hindu God Shiva (lost during World War 2), found at Mactan-Cebu. It shows how the culture of the area was Hindu and Indianized.

The Kingdom of Cebu was a precolonial state. It was founded by Sri Lumay otherwise known as Rajamuda Lumaya, who was a half Malay half Tamil (South Indian) from the island of Sumatra, a colony of Rajendra I's Indian-Tamil conquest of Southeast Asia. The Chinese recorded the name of the Rajahanate of Cebu as 'Sokbu' (束務) in Hokkien or 'Suwu' in Mandarin. A kingdom of the same name as Suwu was mentioned to have existed as early as the year 1225, according to the Chinese Annals the Zhufan Zhi (諸蕃志) and the later 17th Century Chinese traders to the Philippines referred to Cebu using the same term, it is thus presumed to be the same location. The Indianized royalty of Cebu ruled the native Cebuano people from the Tamil-Sanskrit labeled capital, Singhapala (சிங்கப்பூர்) which is Tamil-Sanskrit for "Lion City", the same root words as with the modern city-state of Singapore. This rajahnate warred against the 'magalos' (slave traders) of Maguindanao and had an alliance with the Rajahnate of Butuan and Indianized Kutai in South Borneo, before it was weakened by the insurrection of Datu Lapulapu. The kingdom enjoyed the diplomatic recognition of Thailand as observed by Ferdinand Magellan's expedition which noted an embassy borne by a ship from Siam (Thailand) that had landed at the Rajahnate and had tributes meant for Rajah Humabon. Goods exported from Cebu include: rice, millet, panicum, maize, figs, oranges, lemons, sugar-canes, cocos, gourds, ginger, honey, and other such things; also palm-wine and some gold.

=== Butuan ===
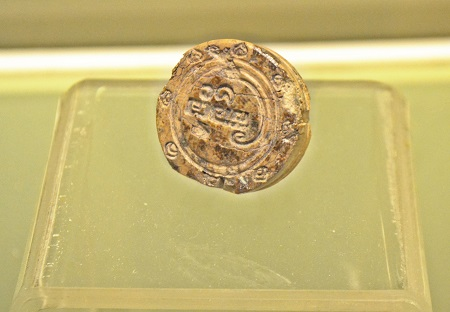
The Butuan Ivory Seal, displayed at the National Museum of the Philippines. The Kawi script lettering says "But-wan" and the smaller lettering (similar to Baybayin) says "Bu-wa" (diacritics for the "Wan/Ban" in Kawi and "Bu/Ba" in the smaller letters have worn off).

The official history of the Song dynasty next refers to the Rajahnate of Butuan (c. before 1001–1756) in northeastern Mindanao which is the first polity from the Philippine archipelago recorded as having sent a tribute mission to the Chinese empire—on March 17, 1001, CE. Butuan later attained prominence under the rule of Rajah Sri Bata Shaja. In the year 1011, Rajah Sri Bata Shaja, the monarch of the Indianized Rajahnate of Butuan, a maritime-state famous for its goldwork and metallurgy industry plus its manufacture of musical instruments sent a trade envoy under ambassador Likan-shieh to the Chinese Imperial Court demanding equal diplomatic status with other states. The request being approved, it opened up direct commercial links with the Rajahnate of Butuan and the Chinese Empire thereby diminishing the monopoly on Chinese trade previously enjoyed by their rivals, Tondo and the Champa civilization. Evidence of the existence of this rajahnate is given by the Butuan Silver Paleograph. Researcher Eric Casino, believes the name of the first Rajah mentioned in Chinese records, Rajah Kiling, is not Visayan in origin but rather, Indian, because Kiling refers to the people of India. The Sejarah Melayu (Malay Annals) of the nearby country of Malaysia, refers to the similarly worded Keling as immigrant people from India.

=== Sanmalan ===
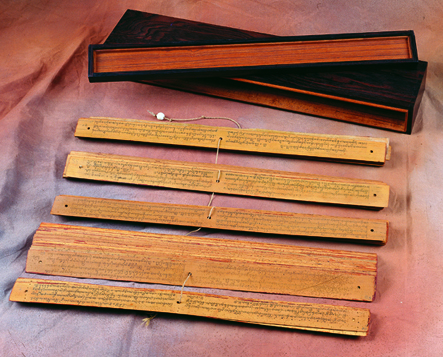
The Nagarakretagama, chronicled the rise of the Java-centered Majapahit Empire and its conquest of the kingdom of Solot (Sulu), which then rebelled and sacked the Majapahit province of Pon-i (Brunei).

At the same time as the rise of Butuan was the emergence of Sanmalan. Sanmalan was a precolonial Philippine kingdom on what is now Zamboanga. Known in Chinese records as "Sanmalan" 三麻蘭. The Chinese chronicled during 982, a tribute from its Rajah or King, Chulan, represented at the imperial court by ambassador Ali Bakti. It transshipped goods from West Asia for local consumption, trading in products like: aromatics, dates, glassware, ivory, peaches, refined sugar, and rose- water. In the 1200s, the Chinese chronicle Zhufan zhi (諸蕃志) recorded its change from a trade emporium to slaving state as Zamboanga began waging war and raiding its neighboring kingdoms in Borneo, Philippines, Sulawesi, and Ternate; for slaves to sell in Java.

=== Influence of the Majapahit onto the Philippines ===
During the 1300s, the Chinese annals, Nanhai zhi, reported that Brunei invaded or administered Sarawak and Sabah as well as the Philippine kingdoms of Butuan, Sulu, and Ma-i (Mindoro) which would regain their independence at a later date. Afterwards, the Javanese-centered Hindu empire of Majapahit, in turn invaded Brunei and had briefly ruled the Sulu Archipelago as recorded in the epic poem Nagarakretagama, which stated that they controlled Solot (Sulu).

Eventually, Sulu reestablished independence, and in vengeance, assaulted the Majapahit province of Poni (Brunei) before a fleet from the capital drove them out.

According to Javanese records a Javanese force expelled Sulu marauders from Brunei during the reign of Angka Wijaya he the last king to reign over Majapahit. The inhabitants of the Soeloe Islands (in the present Philippines) made an attack against Brunei (in order to obtain camphor), in keeping with their (piratical) nature, but they were driven off by the Javanese soldiers.

— Stamford Raffles

Sulu reaction against Majapahit Imperialism did not stop with the sacking of Poni (Brunei) as Sulu also invaded North and East Kalimantan in Borneo, which were former Majapahit territories. The subsequent start of the Islamic era ushered the slow death of Majapahit as its provinces eventually seceded and became independent sultanates. With the upsurge of Islam, the remnants of Hindu Majapahit eventually fled to the island of Bali.

In Luzon, citing Kapampangan oral legends, Nick Joaquin wrote about a princess of Namayan named Sasaban who married the Emperor of Majapahit, locally known as Soledan and is allegedly the Maharajah Anka Widyaya. Sultanate of Sulu

The banner of the Sultanate of Sulu

In 1380, Karim ul' Makdum and Shari'ful Hashem Syed Abu Bakr, an Arab trader born in Johore, Malaysia; arrived in Sulu from Malacca and established the Sultanate of Sulu by converting its previous ruler, the Hindu king, Rajah Baguinda, to Islam and then marrying his daughter. This sultanate eventually gained great wealth due to its diving for fine pearls. Before Islamization, the then Rajahnate of Sulu was established by Visayan speaking Hindu migrants from the Rajahnate of Butuan to the Sulu Archipelago as Tausug, the language of the Sulu state is classified as a Southern Visayan language. Then Hindu Sulu started off as a spice-entrepôt for mutual trade with their cousins in the Butuan Rajahnate as well as the Champa civilization across the sea, in the 10th to 13th Centuries. Champa which is located in Central Vietnam and the port-kingdom of Sulu traded with each other which resulted in Cham merchants settling in Sulu where they were known as Orang Dampuan. The Orang Dampuan were slaughtered by envious native Sulu Buranuns due to the wealth of the Orang Dampuan. The Buranun were then subjected to retaliatory slaughter by the Orang Dampuan. Harmonious commerce between Sulu and the Orang Dampuan was later restored and the Orang Dampuans became the ancestors of the local Yakan people. The Yakans were descendants of the Taguima-based Orang Dampuan who came to Sulu from Champa. As told before, Sulu was also briefly ruled under the Hindu Majapahit empire as narrated in the Nagarakretagama but afterwards, Sulu rebelled and sacked Brunei which was a nearby loyal province of Majapahit as Sulu extended its conquest to the former Majapahit territory of East and North Kalimantan. However, with the onset of Islam by the 15th century, they associated themselves with their new Arab-descended sultans whose origins was in Malacca and their fellow co-religionist Moros (ethnic groups of the Philippine who had accepted Islam) than their still Hindu, Visayan-speaking cousins. This culminated with royal intermarriages between the families of the then newly Islamized Maynila, as well the Sultanates of Brunei, Sulu, and Malacca.

=== Sultanate of Maguindanao ===
The Sultanate of Maguindanao rose to prominence at the end of the 15th century or the beginning of the 16th century, Shariff Mohammed Kabungsuwan of Johor, Malaysia: introduced Islam in the island of Mindanao and he subsequently married Paramisuli, an Iranun princess from Mindanao, and established the Sultanate of Maguindanao.

It ruled most parts of coastal Mindanao and continued to exist prior to the Spanish colonialization until the 19th century. The Sultanate also traded and maintained good relations with the Chinese, Dutch, and the British. The Sultanate's main exports include: rice, wax, tobacco, and clove and cinnamon barks, alongside coconut oil, sago, beans, tortoiseshells, bird's nests, and ebony hardwood.

=== Confederate States of Lanao ===
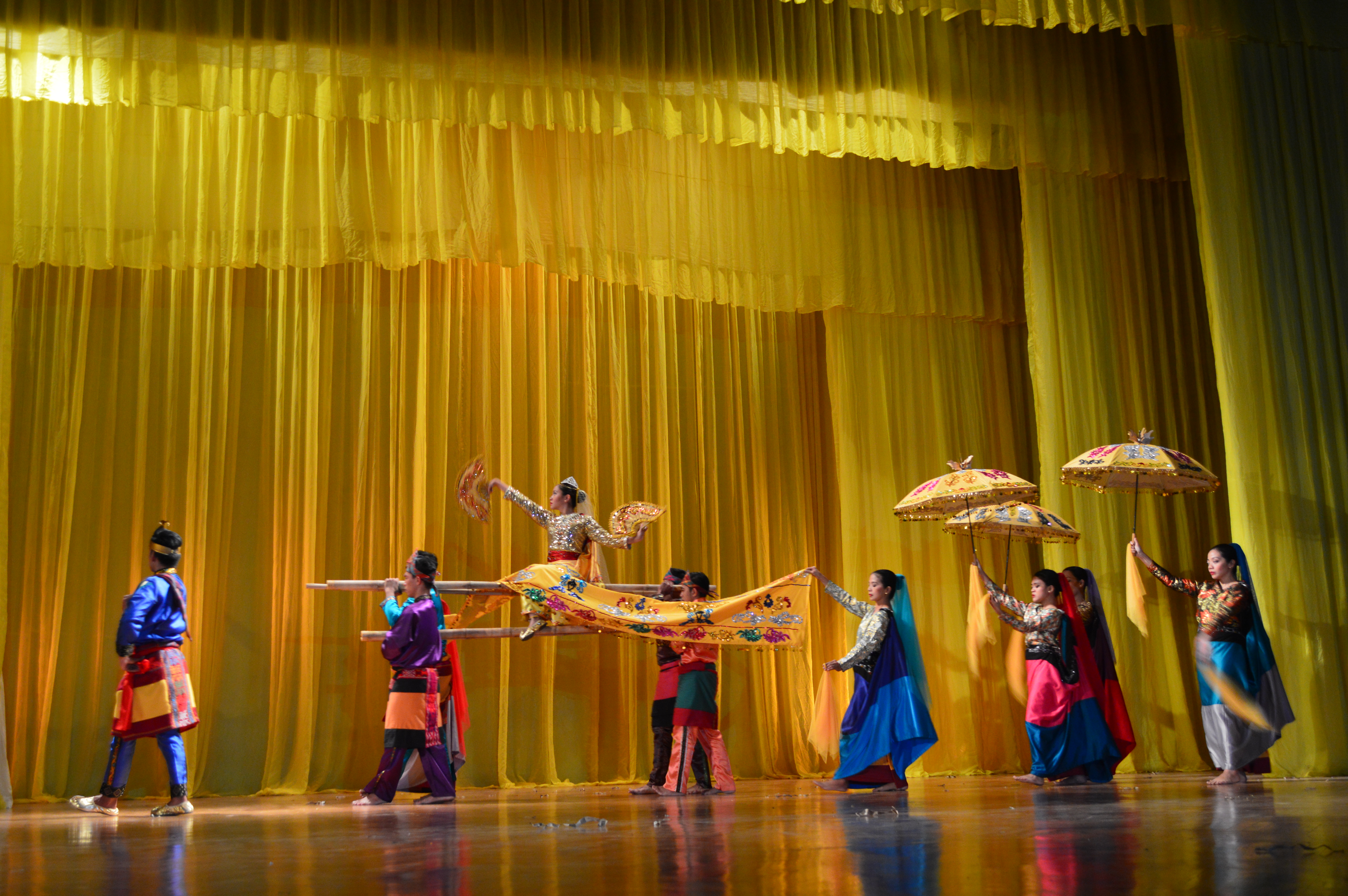
A performance of the Maranao royal dance, the "Singkil".

The Sultanates of Lanao in Mindanao, Philippines were founded in the 16th century through the influence of Shariff Kabungsuan, who was enthroned as first Sultan of Maguindanao in 1515. Islam was introduced to the area by Muslim missionaries and traders from the Middle East, Indian, and Malay regions who propagated Islam to Sulu and Maguindanao. Unlike in Sulu and Maguindanao, the Sultanate system in Lanao was uniquely decentralized. The area was divided into Four Principalities of Lanao or the Pat a Pangampong a Ranao which are composed of a number of royal houses (Sapolo ago Nem a Panoroganan or The Sixteen (16) Royal Houses) with specific territorial jurisdictions within mainland Mindanao. This decentralized structure of royal power in Lanao was adopted by the founders, and maintained up to the present day, in recognition of the shared power and prestige of the ruling clans in the area, emphasizing the values of unity of the nation (kaiisaisa o bangsa), patronage (kaseselai) and fraternity (kapapagaria). By the 16th century, Islam had spread to other parts of the Visayas and Luzon.

=== The Bruneian Empire and the expansion of Islam ===
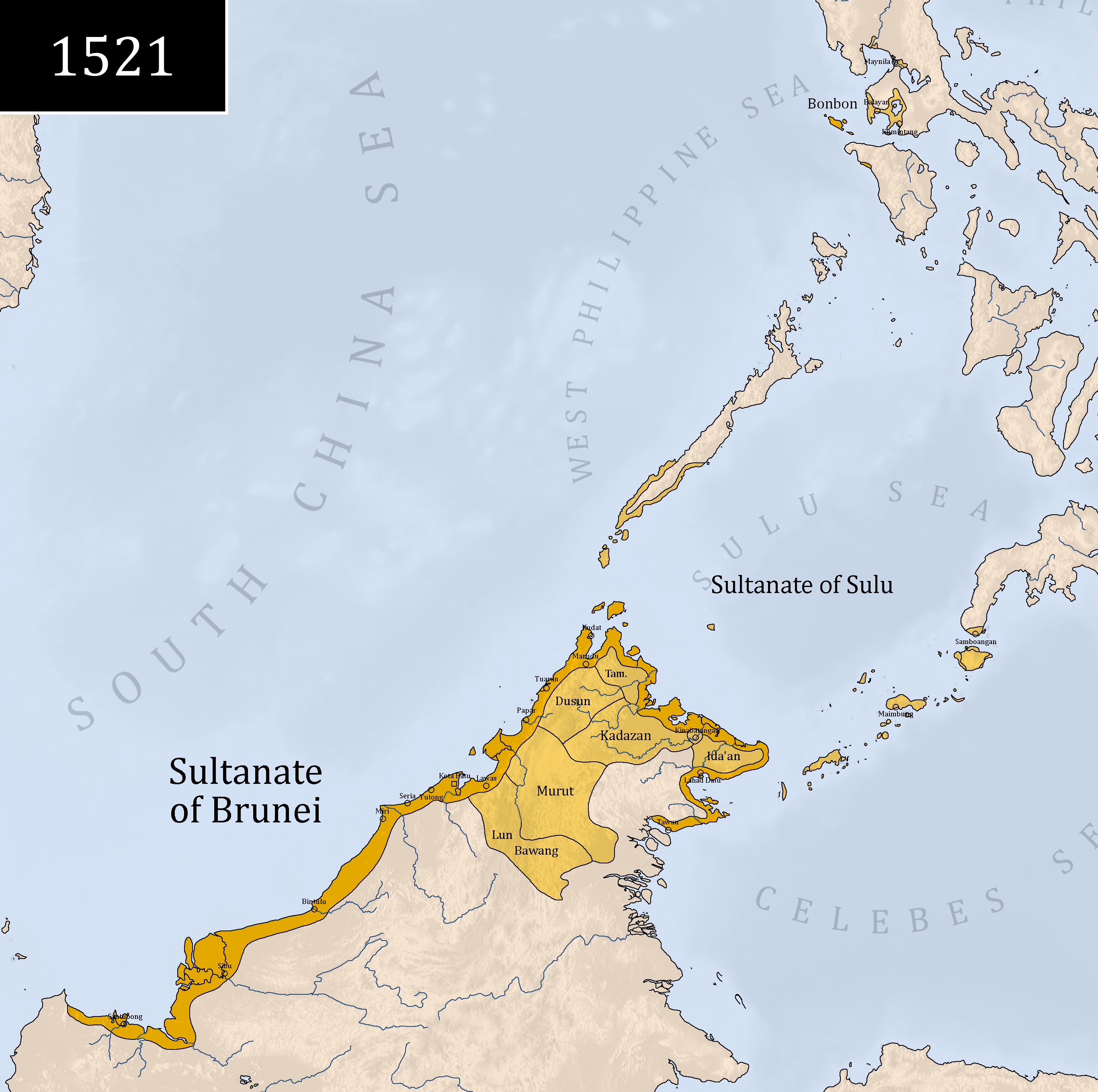
Territorial extent of the Bruneian Empire

Upon the secession of Poni (Brunei) from the Majapahit Empire, they imported the Arab Emir from Mecca, Sharif Ali, and became an independent Sultanate. During the reign of his descendant, Sultan Bolkiah, in 1485 to 1521, he married Laila Menchanai, the daughter of Sulu Sultan Amir Ul-Ombra to expand Brunei's influence in both Luzon and Mindanao. Eventually, Rajah Salalila of Maynila married the daughter of Sultan Bolkiah and Puteri Laila Menchanai of Sulu, placing Maynila under the influence of Brunei. The new dynasty under the Islamized Rajah Salalila was established to challenge the House of Lakandula in Tondo.

Furthermore, Islam was further strengthened by the arrival to the Philippines of traders and proselytizers from Malaysia and Indonesia. The invasion of Brunei spread Chinese royalty such as Ong Sum Ping's kin and companions plus Arab dynasties such as the clan of Sultan Sharif Ali and allies to the Philippines. Brunei was so powerful that it already subjugated their Hindu Bornean neighbor, Kutai, to the south, though Kutai survived through a desperate alliance with Hindu Butuan and Cebu which were already struggling against encroaching Islamic powers like Maguindanao. Brunei had also gained influence over the northern third and the southern third of the Philippines. Sultan Bolkiah is associated with the legend of Nakhoda Ragam the singing captain, a myth about a handsome, virile, strong, musically gifted and angelic voiced prince who is known for his martial exploits. There is contextual evidence that Sultan Bolkiah may indeed be Nakhoda Ragam, since he is of half Visayan-Filipino descent since later Spanish accounts record that Filipinos, especially Visayans, were obsessed with singing and the warrior castes were particularly known for their great singing abilities.

=== The Lucoes ===
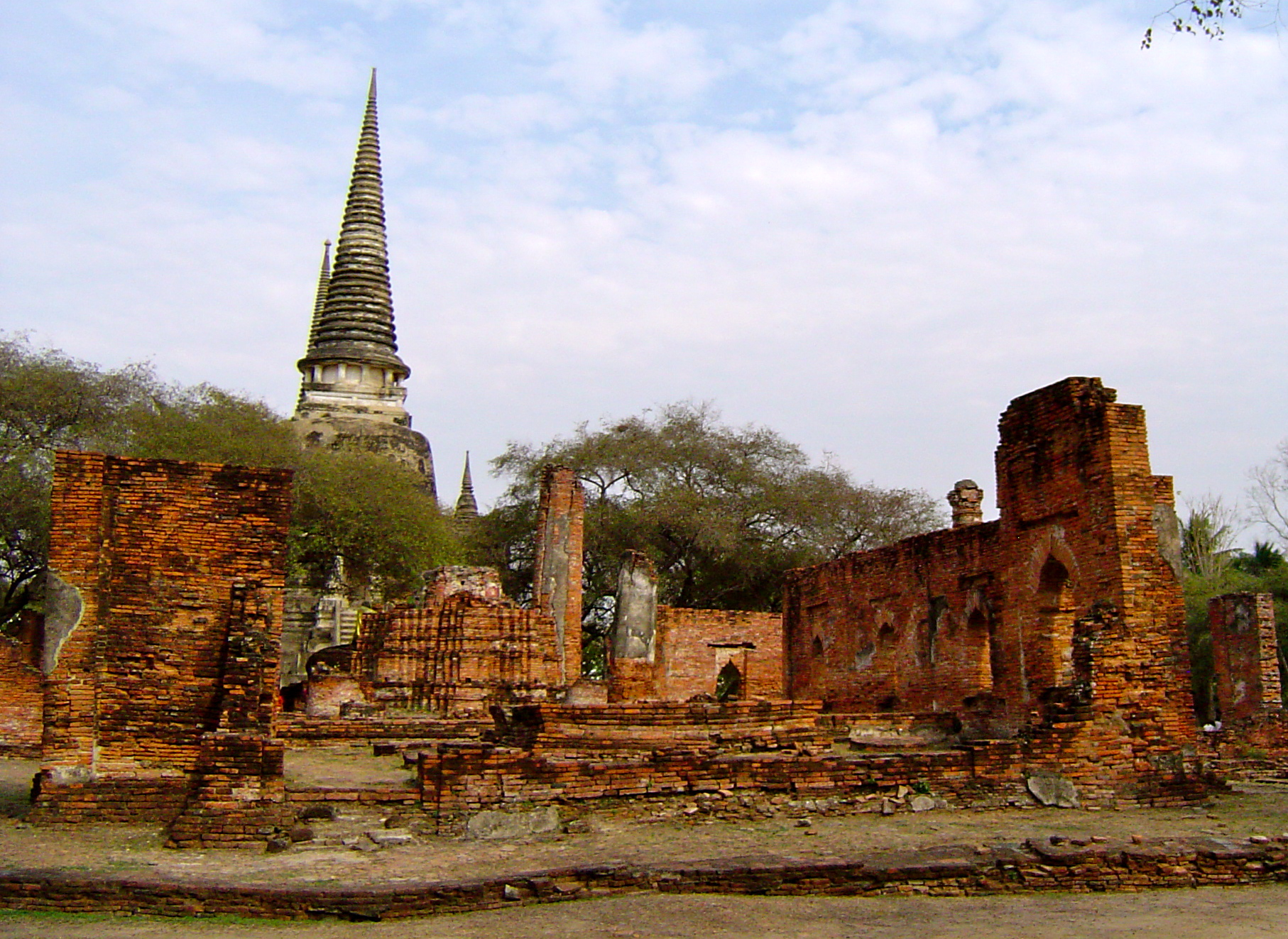
Ruins of the Royal Palace of Ayutthaya, in the Ayutthaya Historical Park. Ayutthaya (Thailand) was the setting of the Burmese-Siamese Wars where Lucoes from Luzon, Philippines were used as soldiers by both sides.

Concurrent with the spread of Islam in the Philippine archipelago was the rise of the Lucoes, or Luzones, who were the people of Luzon. They rose to prominence by establishing overseas communities all across Southeast Asia as well as maintaining relations with South and East Asia, participating in trading ventures, navigation expeditions, and military campaigns in Burma, In 1505, Portuguese naval captains noted the presence of Luzam (Luzones from Luzon island) mercenaries and sailors, working aboard Portuguese ships off the Malabar Coast in Western India, performing as hired muscle men, for the Portuguese war effort against the local Islamic kingdoms of India. Afterwards, Lucoes warriors aided the Burmese king in his invasion of Siam in 1547. At the same time, Lusung warriors fought alongside the Siamese king and faced the same Burmese Army. They were also in Japan, Brunei, Malacca, East Timor, and Sri Lanka where they were employed as traders and mercenaries. One prominent Luções was Regimo de Raja, who was a spice magnate and a Temenggung (Jawi: تمڠݢوڠ) (Governor and Chief General) in Portuguese Malacca. He was also the head of an international armada which traded and protected commerce between the Indian Ocean, the Strait of Malacca, the South China Sea, and the medieval maritime principalities of the Philippines.

Pinto noted that there were a number of Luzones in the Islamic fleets that went to battle with the Portuguese in the Philippines during the 16th century. The Sultan of Aceh together with the Ottoman commander Heredim Mafamede whose uncle was the Viceroy of Egypt, assigned Luzones to defend Aceh, and gave one of them, Sapetu Diraja, the task of holding Aru (northeast Sumatra) in 1540. Pinto also says one was named leader of the Malays remaining in the Moluccas Islands after the Portuguese conquest in 1511. Pigafetta notes that one of them was in command of the Brunei fleet in 1521.

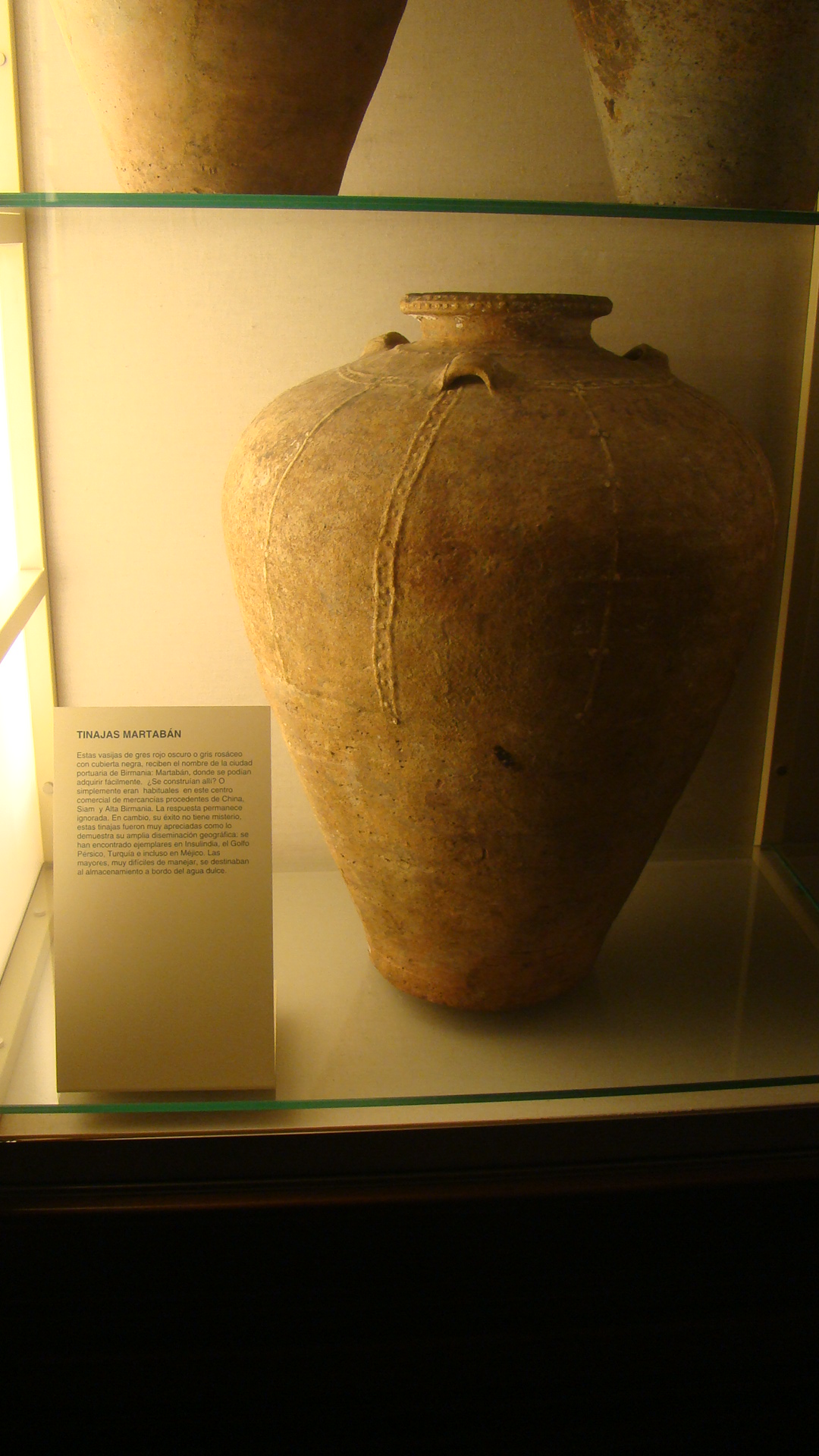
A Luzon jar displayed in the Madrid Museum, Luzon Jars were highly prized in Japan as fermentation and taste enhancers of Japanese Matcha (Green Tea), due to the clay used formed out of the Philippines' unique volcanic soil. The Luzon Jars were used in the formal and sacred Japanese Zen Tea Ceremony which was also prized due to the Wabi Sabi aesthetics the Luzon Jars had embodied.

However, the Luzones did not only fight on the side of the Muslims. Pinto says they were also apparently among the natives of the Philippines who fought the Muslims in 1538.

The Luzones were also pioneer seafarers, and it is recorded that the Portuguese were not only witnesses but also direct beneficiaries of Lusung's involvement. Many Luzones chose Malacca as their base of operations because of its strategic importance. When the Portuguese finally took Malacca in 1512, the resident Luzones held important government posts in the former sultanate. They were also large-scale exporters and ship owners that regularly sent junks to China, Brunei, Sumatra, Siam, and Sunda. One Lusung official by the name of Surya Diraja annually sent 175 tons of pepper to China and had to pay the Portuguese 9000 cruzados in gold to retain his plantation. His ships became part of the first Portuguese fleet that paid an official visit to the Chinese empire in 1517. Furthermore, the Boxer Codex said that: "The Luções, called Lequios, bring gold and cotton from their land, and trade Chinese silk and porcelain" It is also recorded that every year, the Luções load Canton with 175 casks of pepper. In addition to this, they also brought tortoise-shell and resins from their coast, which fetched a high price in China. Overall, "In the fairs of Malacca, the Luções were famed merchants of pepper and gold, even exchanging them for Chinese silk." As Fernão Lopes de Castanheda writes of them.

On Mainland Southeast Asia, Luzones aided the Burmese king in his invasion of Siam in 1547. At the same time, Luzones fought alongside the Siamese king and faced the same elephant army of the Burmese king in the defence of the Siamese capital at Ayuthaya. Diogo do Couto wrote of them as such: "Under their chief Balagtas, 300 Luções fought for the King of Siam against Burmese invaders—so effective that the Siamese granted them land." The fact that the Thai/Siamese king granted them land and ennobled them attest to their admirable performance. Lucoes military and trade activity reached as far as Sri Lanka in the Indian subcontinent where Lungshanoid pottery made in Luzon were discovered in burials. The people of the Philippines, even though being made up of independent kingdoms, still had dynamic alliances with each other, and each Philippine state often practiced economic specialization in order to use the principle of comparative advantage which they leveraged on others.

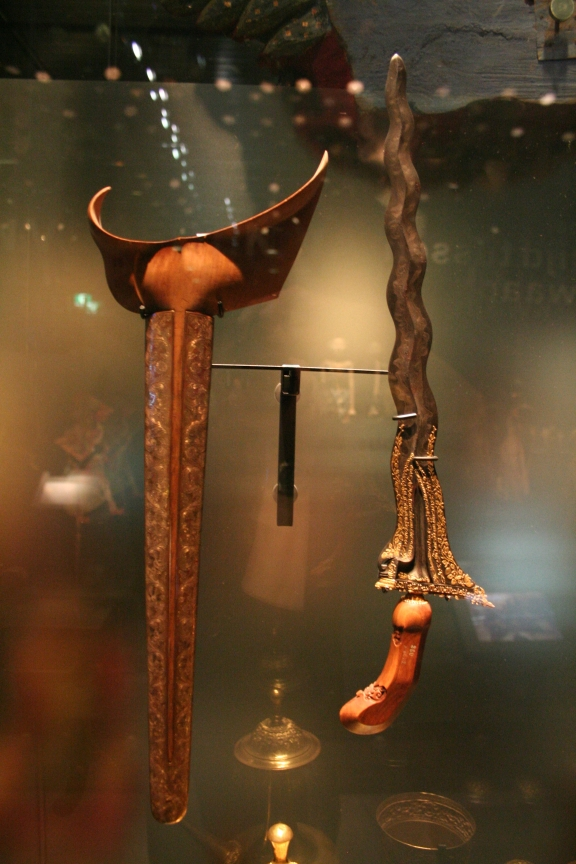
An example of a Kris Sword, Luzones soldiers from Luzon-Philippines were so adept in Kris wielding and martial arts, they became the Sultanate of Aceh's royal guards.

The Portuguese were soon relying on Luzones bureaucrats for the administration of Malacca and on Luzones warriors, ships, and pilots for their military and commercial ventures in East Asia.

It was through the Luzones who regularly sent ships to China that the Portuguese discovered the ports of Canton in 1514. And it was on Luzones ships that the Portuguese were able to send their first diplomatic mission to China 1517. The Portuguese had the Luzones to thank for when they finally established their base at Macao in the mid-1500s.

The Luzones were also instrumental in guiding Portuguese ships to discover Japan. The Western world first heard of Japan through the Portuguese. But it was through the Luzones that the Portuguese had their first encounter with the Japanese. The Portuguese king commissioned his subjects to get good pilots that could guide them beyond the seas of China and Malacca. In 1540, the Portuguese king's factor in Brunei, Brás Baião, recommended to his king the employment of Lusung pilots because of their reputation as "discoverers." Thus it was through Luzones navigators that Portuguese ships found their way to Japan in 1543. It is interesting to note that the Luzones have been employing gunpowder weapons and early guns like Lantakas and Astinggals, decades before Japan started using guns. The Luzones so impressed the Portuguese soldier, Joao de Barros, he considered the Luzones who were militarily and commercially active across the region, "the most warlike and valiant of these parts." Meanwhile, in the nearby Sultanate of Aceh the Luções fighting men so impressed the Sultan, that they were assigned to become the Sultan's royal guard and to be assigned as the Sultan's royal guard, is proof of Luçoes men's physical strength, martial prowess, and masculine attractiveness; as during that time period, among medieval kingdoms, that office was delegated only to the most strong, intelligent, handsome, attractive, virile, aristocratic, and combat-worthy, of warriors.

Filipinos from the island of Luzon (Lucoes) were not the only Filipinos abroad, historian William Henry Scott, quoting the Portuguese manuscript Summa Orientalis, noted that Mottama in Burma (Myanmar) had a large presence of merchants from the island of Mindanao.

=== Rise and fall of Bo-ol ===
Around 1563, at the closing stages of the precolonial era, the Bo-ol achieved prominence and it was known to a later Spanish missionary, Alcina, as the "Venice of the Visayas", because it was a wealthy, wooden, and floating city-state in the Visayas. However, this kingdom was eventually attacked and destroyed by soldiers from the Sultanate of Ternate, a state made up of Muslim Moluccans. The survivors of the destruction, led by their datu, Pagbuaya, migrated to northern Mindanao and established a new settlement in the region known as Dapitan.

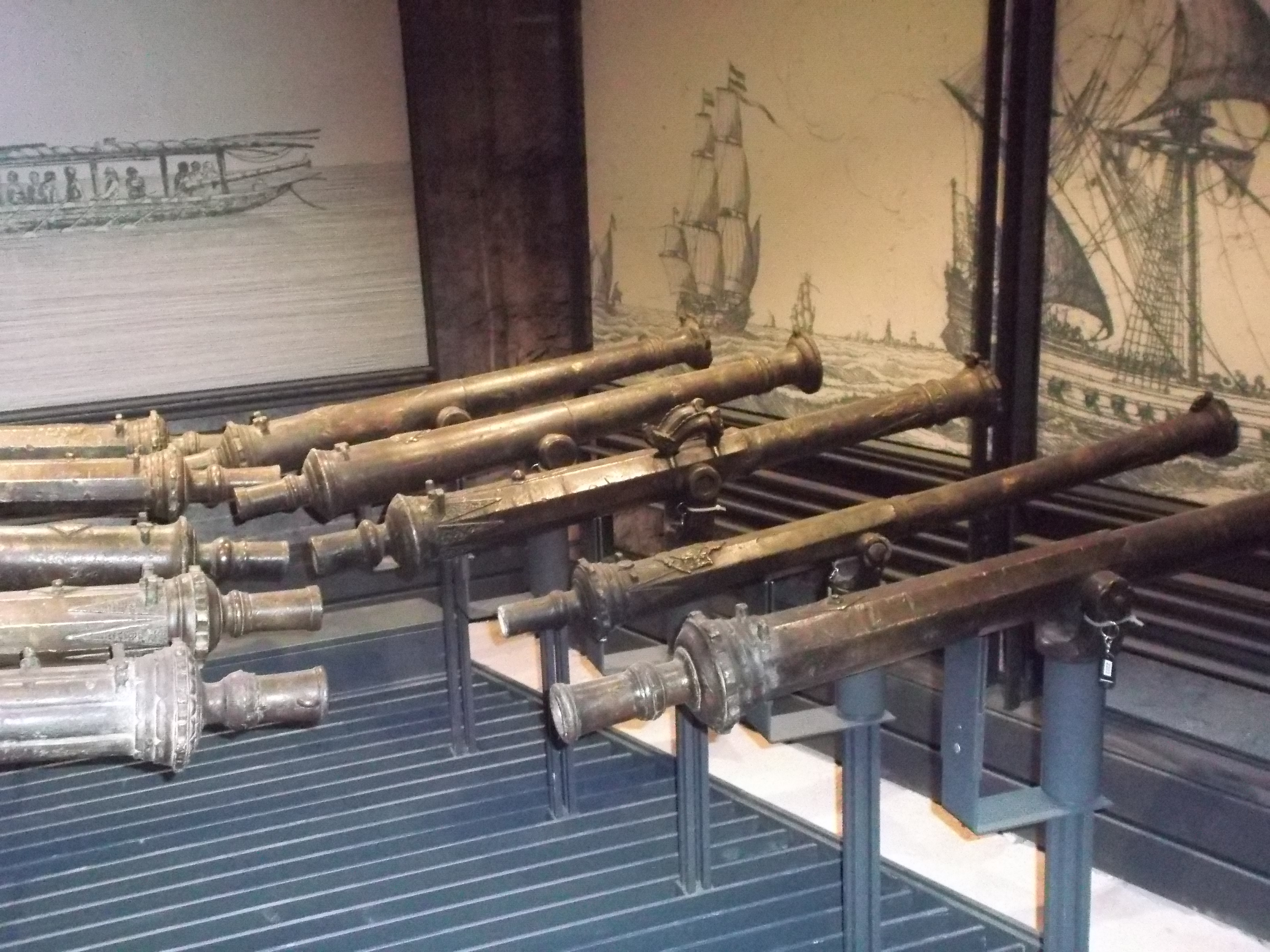
A collection of Philippine lantaka, a type of swivel-gun used in inter-kingdom wars.

They then waged war against the Sultanate of Lanao and settled in the lands conquered from them. Eventually, in vengeance against the Muslims and Portuguese allied to the Ternateans, they aided the Spanish in the conquest of Muslim Manila and in the Spanish expeditions to capture Portuguese Ternate.

=== Inter-kingdom rivalries ===
During this period there was also a simmering territorial conflict between the polity of Tondo and Maynila, to which the ruler of Maynila, Rajah Matanda, sought military assistance against Tondo from his relatives at the Sultanate of Brunei. The Hindu Rajahnates of Butuan and Cebu also endured slave raids from, and waged wars against the Sultanate of Maguindanao. Simultaneous with these slave-raids, was the rebellion of Datu Lapulapu of Mactan against Rajah Humabon of Cebu. The population was sparse due to warfare and also due to the common frequency of typhoons and the Philippines' location on the Pacific ring of fire. The multiple states competing over the limited territory and people of the islands simplified Spanish colonialization by allowing its conquistadors to effectively employ a strategy of divide and conquer for rapid conquest.

== Spanish settlement and rule (1565–1898) ==
=== Early Spanish expeditions and conquests ===
A Spanish expedition around the world led by Portuguese explorer Ferdinand Magellan sighted Samar Island but anchored off Suluan Island on March 16, 1521. They landed the next day on Homonhon Island, now part of Guiuan, Eastern Samar. Magellan claimed the islands he saw for Spain and named them Islas de San Lázaro. He established friendly relations with some of the local leaders especially with Rajah Humabon and converted some of them to Christianity. In the Philippines, they explored many islands including the island of Mactan. However, Magellan was killed during the Battle of Mactan against the local datu, Lapulapu. When Christian Spaniards went to the Philippines via traveling through Latin America and the Pacific, they even encountered Muslim speakers of Spanish who learned it from citizens of the former Islamic Spanish Emirate of Granada, thus connecting both Western and Eastern extremes of the Muslim world. Despite encountering Muslims in the Philippines, and the Filipinos; both Pagan (Hindu, Buddhist, and Animist) as well as Muslim, finding the Christian Spaniards as Frenemies against their neighbors, some of the Filipinos were already allied to and were exposed to the Christian Portuguese, decades before they were exposed to Christian Spaniards.

Over the next several decades, other Spanish expeditions were dispatched to the islands. Ruy López de Villalobos led an expedition that visited Leyte and Samar in 1543 and named them Las Islas Filipinas in honor of Philip of Asturias, the Prince of Asturias at the time. Philip became Philip II of Spain on January 16, 1556, when his father, Charles I of Spain (who also reigned as Charles V, Holy Roman Emperor), abdicated the Spanish throne. The name was then extended to the entire archipelago later on in the Spanish era.

1734 Spanish Chart of the Philippine Islands

European colonialization began in earnest when Spanish explorer Miguel López de Legazpi arrived from Mexico in 1565 and formed the first European settlements in Cebu. Side by side with these European settlements were towns founded by Native American Tlaxcalans who accompanied Juan de Salcedo, a knight born from Mexico, from Cebu and were given pensions, and they numbered 400 in the initial expedition. Beginning with just five ships and five hundred men accompanied by Augustinian monks, and further strengthened in 1567 by two hundred soldiers, he was able to repel the Portuguese and create the foundations for the unification and colonialization of the Archipelago. In 1571, the Spanish, their Latin-American recruits and their Filipino (Visayan) allies, commanded by able conquistadors such as Mexico-born Juan de Salcedo (who was in love with Tondo's princess, Kandarapa, a romance his Spanish grandfather Miguel Lopez de Legaspi, disapproved of) attacked Maynila, a vassal-state of the Brunei Sultanate and liberated plus incorporated the kingdom of Tondo as well as establishing Manila as the capital of the Spanish East Indies. During the early part of the Spanish colonialization of the Philippines, the Spanish Augustinian friar Gaspar de San Agustín, O.S.A., describes Iloilo and Panay as one of the most populated islands in the archipelago and the most fertile of all the islands of the Philippines. He also talks about Iloilo, particularly the ancient settlement of Halaur, as site of a progressive trading post and a court of illustrious nobles.

Legazpi built a fort in Maynila and made overtures of friendship to Lakan Dula, Lakan of Tondo, who accepted. However, Maynila's former ruler, the Muslim rajah, Rajah Sulayman, who was a vassal to the Sultan of Brunei, refused to submit to Legazpi, but failed to get the support of Lakan Dula or of the Pampangan and Pangasinan settlements to the north. When Tarik Sulayman, alongside a force of Kapampangan and Tagalog Muslim warriors, attacked the Spaniards in the battle of Bangkusay, he was finally defeated and killed. The Spanish also destroyed the walled Kapampangan city-state of Cainta.

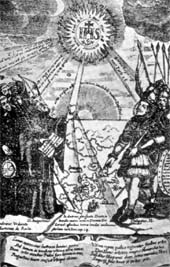
A late 17th-century manuscript by Gaspar de San Agustin from the Archive of the Indies, depicting López de Legazpi's conquest of the Philippines

In 1578, the Castilian War erupted between the Christian Spaniards and Muslim Bruneians over control of the Philippine archipelago. On one side, the newly Christianized non-Muslim Visayans of Panay and Cebu, as well as Butuan (which were from northern Mindanao), as well as the remnants of Bo-ol (Dapitan) had previously waged war against the Sultanate of Sulu, Sultanate of Maguindanao and Kingdom of Maynila, then joined the Spanish in the war against the Bruneian Empire and its allies, the Bruneian puppet-state of Maynila, Sulu which had dynastic links with Brunei as well as Maguindanao which was an ally of Sulu. The Spanish and its Visayan allies assaulted Brunei and seized its capital, Kota Batu. This was achieved as a result in part of the assistance rendered to them by two noblemen, Pengiran Seri Lela and Pengiran Seri Ratna. The former had traveled to Manila to offer Brunei as a tributary of Spain for help to recover the throne usurped by his brother, Saiful Rijal. The Spanish agreed that if they succeeded in conquering Brunei, Pengiran Seri Lela would indeed become the sultan, while Pengiran Seri Ratna would be the new Bendahara. In March 1578, the Spanish fleet, led by De Sande himself, acting as Capitán General, started their journey towards Brunei. The expedition consisted of 400 Spaniards and Mexicans, 1,500 Filipino natives and 300 Borneans. The campaign was one of many, which also included action in Mindanao and Sulu.

The Spanish succeeded in invading the capital on April 16, 1578, with the help of Pengiran Seri Lela and Pengiran Seri Ratna. Sultan Saiful Rijal and Paduka Seri Begawan Sultan Abdul Kahar were forced to flee to Meragang then to Jerudong. In Jerudong, they made plans to chase the conquering army away from Brunei. The Spanish suffered heavy losses due to a cholera or dysentery outbreak. They were so weakened by the illness that they decided to abandon Brunei to return to Manila on June 26, 1578, after just 72 days. Before doing so, they burned the mosque, a high structure with a five-tier roof.

Pengiran Seri Lela died in August–September 1578, probably from the same illness that had afflicted his Spanish allies, although there was suspicion, he could have been poisoned by the ruling sultan. Seri Lela's daughter, the Bruneian princess, left with the Spanish and went on to marry a Christian Tagalog, named Agustín de Legazpi of Tondo and had children in the Philippines.

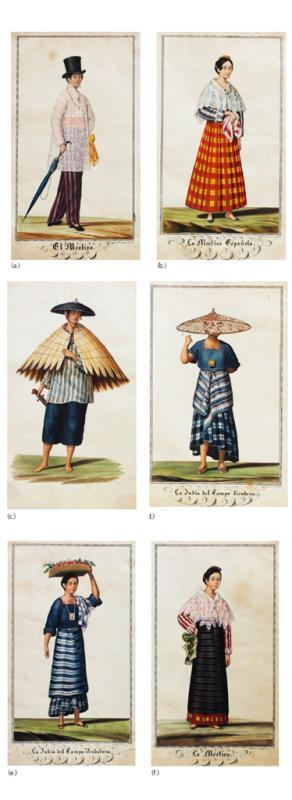
Filipinos during the Spanish era.

Concurrently, northern Luzon became a center of the "Bahan Trade" (comercio de bafan), found in Luís Fróis' Historia de Japam, mainly refers to the robberies, raids, and pillages conducted by the Japanese pirates of Kyūshūa as they assaulted the China seas. The Sengoku period (1477–1603) or the warring states period of Japan had spread the wakō's 倭寇 (Japanese Pirates) activities in the China Seas, some groups of these raiders relocated to the Philippines and established their settlements in Luzon. Because of the proximity to China's beaches, the Philippines were favorable a location to launch raids on the provinces of Guangdong and Fujian, and for shipping with Indochina and the Ryūkyū Islands. These were the halcyon days of the Philippine branch of the Bahan trade. Thus, the Spanish sought to fight off these Japanese Pirates, prominent among whom was warlord Tayfusa, whom the Spaniards expelled after he set up the beginnings of a city-state of Japanese pirates in Northern Luzon. The Spanish repelled them in the fabled 1582 Cagayan battles. Due to the 1549 Ming ban on trade leveled against the Ashikaga shogunate as a consequence of the Wokou pirate raids, this resulted in the ban for all the Japanese to enter China, and for Chinese ships to sail to Japan. Thus, Manila became the only place where the Japanese and Chinese can openly trade, often also trading Japanese silver for Chinese silk.

In 1587, Magat Salamat, one of the children of Lakandula, along with Lakandula's nephew and lords of the neighboring areas of Tondo, Pandacan, Marikina, Candaba, Navotas, and Bulacan, were executed when the Tondo Conspiracy of 1587–1588 failed in which a planned grand alliance with the Japanese Christian-captain, Gayo, (Gayo himself was a Woku who once pirated in Cagayan) and Brunei's sultan, would have restored the old aristocracy. Its failure resulted in the hanging of Agustín de Legaspi and the execution of Magat Salamat (the crown-prince of Tondo). Thereafter, some of the conspirators were exiled to Guam or Guerrero, Mexico.

Spanish power was further consolidated after Miguel López de Legazpi's complete assimilation of Madja-as, his subjugation of Rajah Tupas, the Rajah of Cebu and Juan de Salcedo's conquest of the provinces of Zambales, La Union, Ilocos, the coast of Cagayan, and the ransacking of the Chinese warlord Limahong's pirate kingdom in Pangasinan.

The Spanish also invaded Northern Taiwan and Ternate in Indonesia, using Filipino warriors, before they were driven out by the Dutch. The Sultanate of Ternate reverted to independence and afterwards led a coalition of sultanates against Spain. While Taiwan became the stronghold of the Ming-loyalist and pirate state of the Kingdom of Tungning. The Spanish and the Moros of the sultanates of Maguindanao, Lanao, and Sulu also waged many wars over hundreds of years in the Spanish–Moro conflict, they were supported by the Papuan language speaking Sultanate of Ternate in Indonesia which regained independence from Spain, as well as the Sultanate of Brunei, not until the 19th century did Spain succeed in defeating the Sulu Sultanate and taking Mindanao under nominal suzerainty.

Persians and Arabs and Egyptians and Turks brought [Muhammad's] veneration and evil sect here, and even Moors from Tunis and Granada came here, sometimes in the armadas of Campson [Kait Bey], former Sultan of Cairo and King of Egypt... Thus it seems to me that these Moros of the Philippine Islands [are] mainly those who, as had been said, come from Egypt and Arabia and Mecca, and are their relatives, disciples and members, and every year they say that Turks come to Sumatra and Borneo, and to Ternate, where there are now some of those defeated in the famous battle which Señor Don Juan de Austria won.

— Melchor Davalos

The Spanish considered their war with the Muslims in Southeast Asia an extension of the Reconquista, a centuries-long campaign to retake and rechristianize the Spanish homeland which was invaded by the Muslims of the Umayyad Caliphate. The Spanish expeditions into the Philippines were also part of a larger Ibero-Islamic world conflict that included a war against the Ottoman Caliphate which had just invaded former Christian lands in the Eastern Mediterranean and which had a center of operations in Southeast Asia at its nearby vassal, the Sultanate of Aceh. Thus the Philippines became a theatre of the ongoing world-wide-ranging Ottoman–Habsburg wars.

In time, Spanish fortifications were also set up in Taiwan and the Maluku islands. These were abandoned and the Spanish soldiers, along with the newly Christianized natives of the Moluccas, withdrew back to the Philippines in order to re-concentrate their military forces because of a threatened invasion by the Japan-born Ming-dynasty loyalist, Koxinga, ruler of the Kingdom of Tungning. However, the planned invasion was aborted. Meanwhile, settlers were sent to the Pacific islands of Palau and the Marianas.

To counteract the Muslim threats reinforced from Ottoman Turkey, the Spaniards imported Latin American soldiers from Peru, Panama, and Mexico.

"He (Governor Don Sebastían Hurtado de Corcuera) brought a great reënforcements of soldiers, many of them from Perú, as he made his voyage to Acapulco from that kingdom."

— Casimiro Díaz

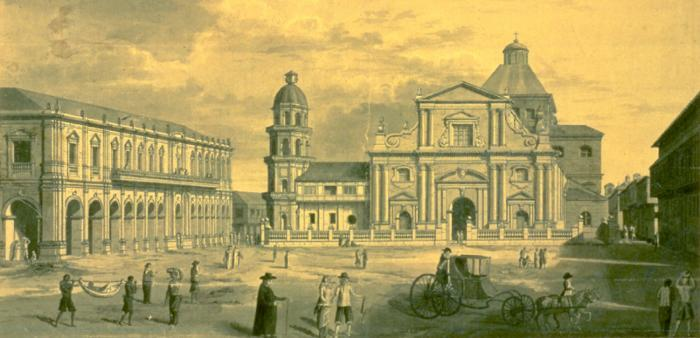
The sketch of the Plaza de Roma Manila by Fernando Brambila, a member of the Malaspina Expedition during their stop in Manila in 1792.

In 1593, a diplomatic entourage addressed to the "King of Luzon" from the King of Cambodia which bore an elephant as a tribute arrived in Manila. The King of Cambodia which witnessed the military activity of precolonial Luzones people who were mercenaries across Southeast Asia including at Burma and Siam, now implored the new rulers of Luzon, the Spaniards, to aid him in a war to retake his kingdom from an invasion by the Siamese. That had caused the ill-fated Spanish expedition to Cambodia that although ended in failure had set the foundations of the future restoration of Cambodia from Thai rule under French Cochinchina which tapped Spanish allies.

=== Incorporation to the Mexico-based Viceroyalty of New Spain ===
Map of the Mexico Centered Viceroyalty of New Spain as of year 1794. Due to distance from Spain proper: colonists, soldiers, and the subsidy for the Philippines was organized from nearer Mexico.

The founding of Manila by uniting the dominions of Sulayman III and Rajah Ache Matanda of Maynila who was a vassal to the Sultan of Brunei, and Lakandula of Tondo who paid tribute to Ming dynasty China – caused the creation of Manila on February 6, 1579, through the Papal bull Illius Fulti Præsidio by Pope Gregory XIII, encompassing all Spanish colonies in Asia as a suffragan of the Archdiocese of Mexico. Aside from Manila the capital, the Spanish and Latino populations were first concentrated in the 5 newly founded Spanish Royal Cities of Cebu, Arevalo, Nueva Segovia, Nueva Caceres, and Vigan. Aside from these cities, they were also scattered across the Presidios of Cavite, Calamianes, Caraga, and Zamboanga. For much of the Spanish period, the Philippines was part of the Mexico-based Viceroyalty of New Spain. Of the Spaniards and Latinos sent to the Philippines, almost half of the individuals levied to Manila were reported in judicial files as españoles (Spanish born in the colonies, who were often just "very pale mestizos"), and about a third, as mestizos (whereas Indian (Native American), mulattos, and blacks could be mistaken for mestizos of darker color). Castizos amounted to a total of 15 percent, while peninsulares (Spaniards born in Spain) were around 5 percent of those punished with deportation to Manila.

The Spanish unified and rationalized the demographic layout, resource extraction, defense, and commerce of the colony; which was previously a scattered constellation of rival precolonial kingdoms, often with their own competing laws and armies, via a process known as the "Iberian Reductions", wherein people were relocated, sometimes forcibly, from their previous settlements and were resettled into new towns and barrios which were modeled after academic standards formed in Spain and Portugal. People were moved into a centralized cabecera (town/district capital), where a newly built church and an ayuntamiento (town hall) were situated. This allowed the government to defend, control, and Christianize the indigenous population in scattered independent settlements, to conduct population counts, and to collect tributes. The new aristocracy in these newly founded towns were the Principalía, which arose when Spanish and Mexican settlers intermixed with the precolonial native royalty and Chinese merchant elites, and formed a nascent landed gentry per each locale.

=== Spanish settlement during the 16th and 17th centuries ===
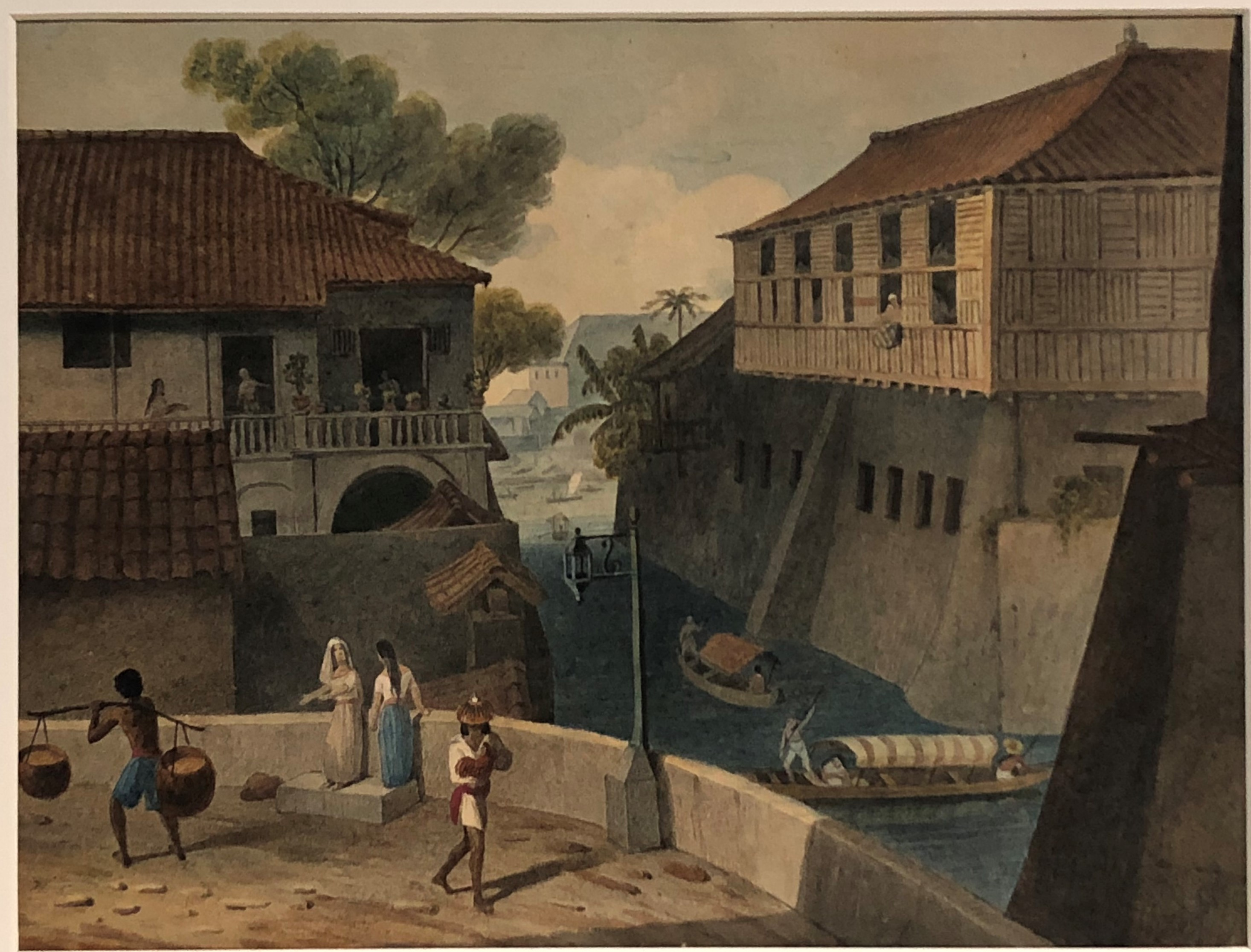
Spanish era Manila canal

The "Memoria de las Encomiendas en las Islas" of 1591, just twenty years after the conquest of Luzon, reveals a remarkable progress in the work of colonialization and the spread of Christianity. A cathedral was built in the city of Manila with an episcopal palace, Augustinian, Dominican, and Franciscan monasteries and a Jesuit house. The king maintained a hospital for the Spanish settlers and there was another hospital for the natives run by the Franciscans. In order to defend the settlements the Spaniards established in the Philippines, a network of military fortresses called "Presidios" were constructed and officered by the Spaniards, and sentried by Latin-Americans and Filipinos, across the archipelago, to protect it from foreign nations such as the Portuguese, British, and Dutch as well as raiding Muslims and Wokou.

The Manila garrison was composed of roughly four hundred Spanish soldiers and the area of Intramuros as well as its surroundings, were initially settled by 1200 Spanish families. In Cebu City, at the Visayas, the settlement received a total of 2,100 soldier-settlers from New Spain. At the immediate south of Manila, Mexicans were present at Ermita and at Cavite where they were stationed as sentries. In addition, men conscripted from Peru, were also sent to settle Zamboanga City in Mindanao, to wage war upon Muslim pirates. These Peruvian soldiers who settled in Zamboanga were led by Don Sebastián Hurtado de Corcuera who was governor of Panama. He also used Panamanians, including even some Genoese from Panama Viejo descended from colonists at the Republic of Genoa, a nation once active in the Crusades. There were also communities of Spanish-Mestizos that developed in Iloilo, Negros, and Vigan.

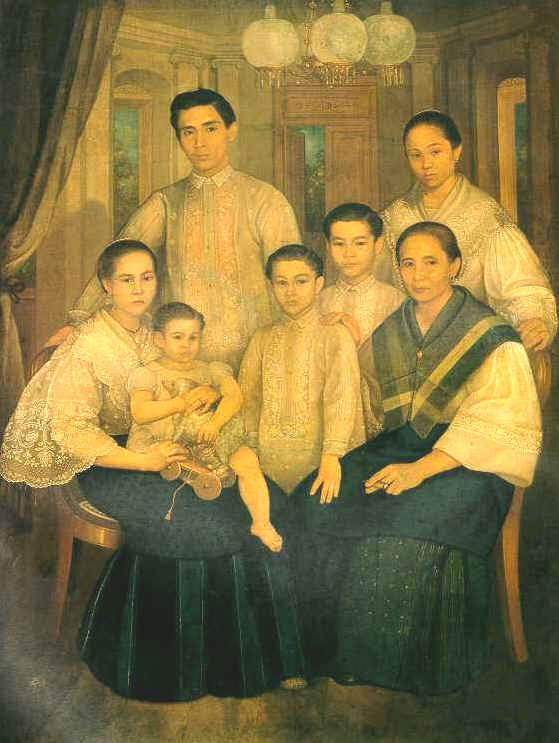
Principalía family by Simón Flores y de la Rosa, uncle of painter Fabián de la Rosa

Interactions between native Filipinos (Note: During the Spanish colonial period, the terms Insulares and Filipino generally referred to full-blooded Spaniards who had been born in the Philippines, distinguishing them from Spaniards born in Spain who were termed Peninsulares. The first documented use of the tern Filipino to refer to persons of Philippine ethnicity was in the 19th century poem A la juventud filipina by Jose Rizal.) and immigrant Spaniards plus the Latin-Americans and their Spanish-Mestizo descendants eventually caused the formation of a new language, Chavacano, a creole of Mexican Spanish. Meanwhile, in the suburb of Tondo, there was a convent run by Franciscan friars and another by the Dominicans that offered Christian education to the Chinese converts to Christianity. The same report reveals that in and around Manila were collected 9,410 tributes, indicating a population of about 30,640 who were under the instruction of thirteen missionaries (ministers of doctrine), apart from the monks in monasteries. In the former province of Pampanga the population estimate was 74,700 and 28 missionaries. In Pangasinan 2,400 people with eight missionaries. In Cagayan and islands Babuyanes 96,000 people but no missionaries. In La Laguna 48,400 people with 27 missionaries. In Bicol and Camarines Catanduanes islands 86,640 people with fifteen missionaries. Based on the tribute counts, the total founding population of Spanish-Philippines, as of year 1591, was 667,612 people, of which: 20,000 were Chinese migrant traders, 15,600 were Latino soldier-colonists sent from Peru and Mexico (In the 1600s), Immigrants included 3,000 Japanese residents, and 600 pure Spaniards from Europe. Of the 600 Spaniards from Europe, two hundred and thirty-six of them were given encomiendas and were ennobled, as they scattered across the many provinces of the Philippines to serve as administrators. There was also a large but unknown number of Indian Filipinos as majority of the slaves imported into the archipelago were from Bengal or Southern India, adding Dravidian speaking South Indians and Indo-European speaking Bangladeshis into the ethnic mix, and the rest were Malays and Negritos. They were under the care of 140 missionaries, of which 79 were Augustinians, nine Dominicans, and 42 Franciscans. Adding during the Spanish evacuation of Ternate, Indonesia, the 200 families of mixed Mexican-Filipino-Spanish and Moluccan-Portuguese descent who had ruled over the briefly Christianized Sultanate of Ternate (They later reverted to Islam) were relocated to Ternate, Cavite and Ermita, Manila. and they were presaged by their previous ruler, Sultan Said Din Burkat who was enslaved but eventually converted to Christianity and was freed after being deported to Manila.

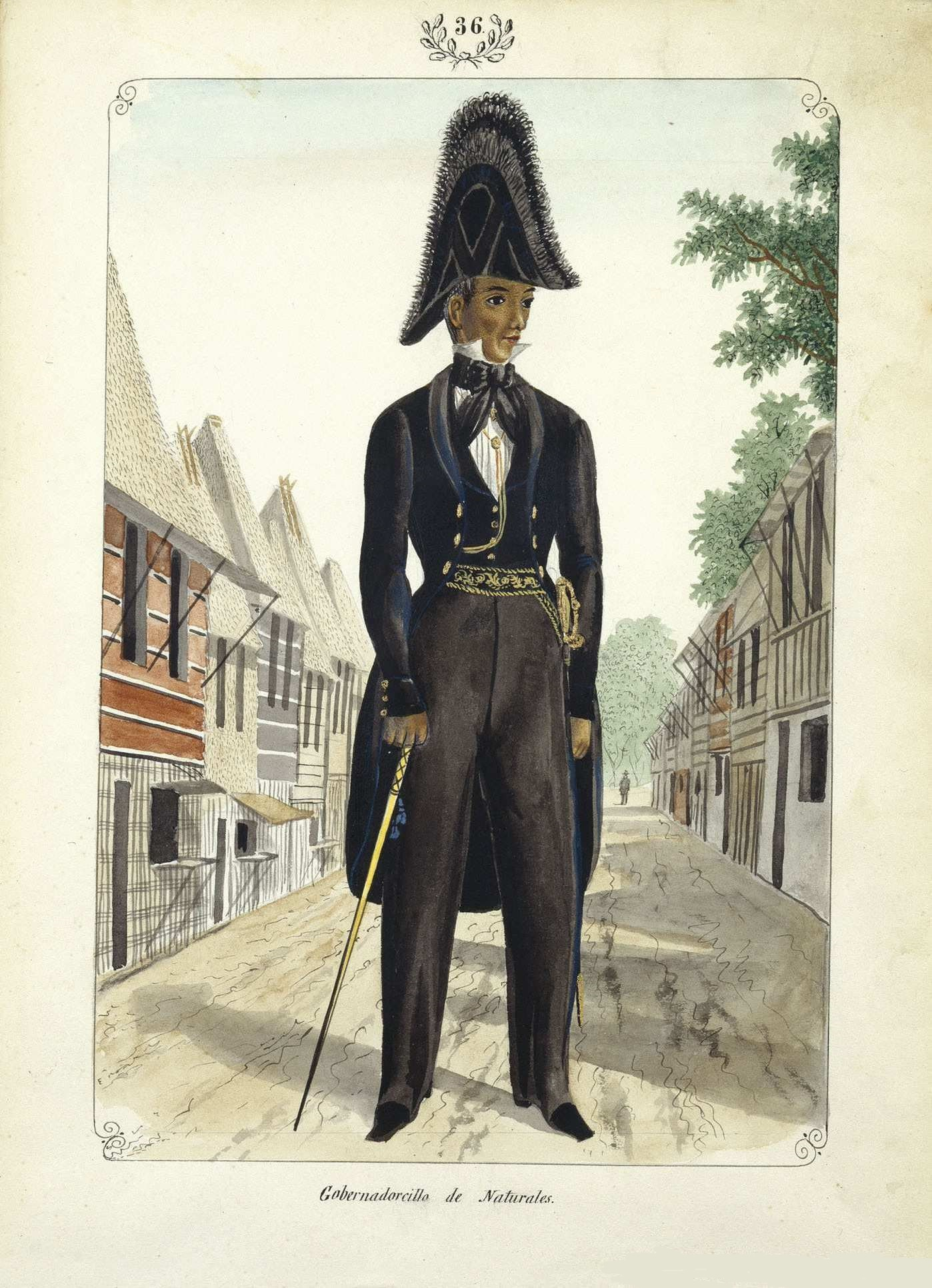
A Gobernadorcillo de Naturales comparable to a modern-day mayor. Mostly of Indio descent.

The islands were fragmented and sparsely populated due to constant inter-kingdom wars and natural disasters (as the country is on the Typhoon belt and Pacific Ring of Fire), which made it easy for the Spanish invasion. The Spanish then brought political unification to most of the Philippine archipelago via the conquest of the various small maritime states although they were unable to fully incorporate parts of the sultanates of Mindanao and the areas where the ethnic groups and highland plutocracy of the animist Ifugao of Northern Luzon were established. The Spanish introduced elements of western civilization such as the code of law, western printing, and the Gregorian calendar alongside new food resources such as maize, pineapple, and chocolate from Latin America.

Education played a major role in the socio-economic transformation of the archipelago. The oldest universities, colleges, and vocational schools and the first modern public education system in Asia were all created during the Spanish colonial period, and by the time Spain was replaced by the United States as the colonial power, Filipinos were among the most educated subjects in all of Asia. The Jesuits founded the Colegio de Manila in 1590, which later became the Universidad de San Ignacio, a royal and pontifical university. They also founded the Colegio de San Ildefonso on August 1, 1595. After the expulsion of the Society of Jesus in 1768, the management of the Jesuit schools passed to other parties. On April 28, 1611, through the initiative of Bishop Miguel de Benavides, the University of Santo Tomas was founded in Manila. The Jesuits also founded the Colegio de San José (1601) and took over the Escuela Municipal, later to be called the Ateneo de Manila University (1859). All institutions offered courses included not only religious topics but also Science subjects such as physics, chemistry, natural history, and mathematics. The University of Santo Tomás, for example, started by teaching theology, philosophy and humanities, and the Faculty of Jurisprudence and Canonical Law, together with the schools of medicine and pharmacy were opened during the 18th century.

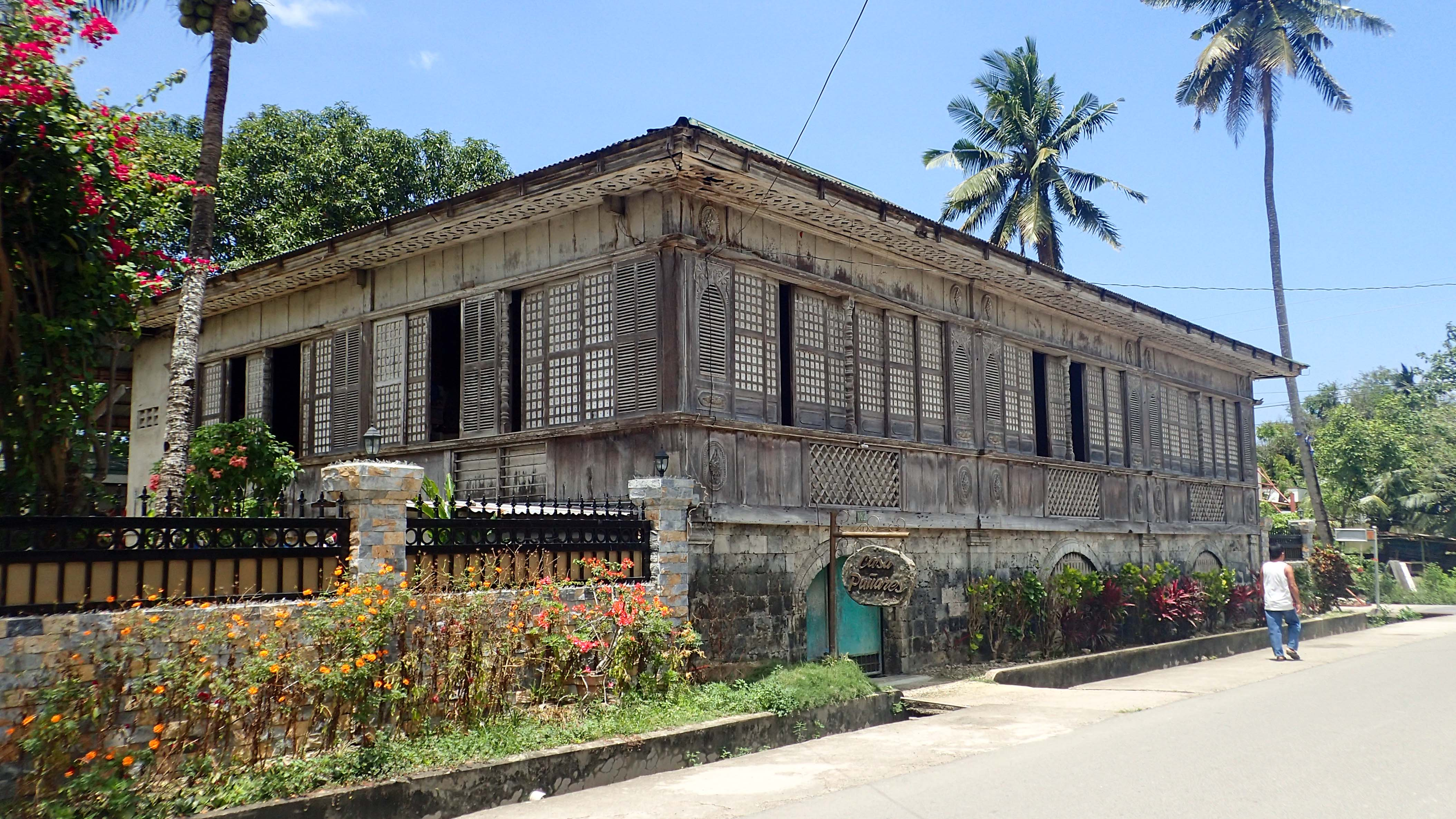
Bahay na bato, a typical Filipino urban house during the colonial era

Outside the tertiary institutions, the efforts of missionaries were in no way limited to religious instruction but also geared towards promoting social and economic advancement of the islands. They cultivated into the natives their taste for music and taught Spanish language to children. They also introduced advances in rice agriculture, brought maize and cocoa from America, and developed the farming of indigo, coffee, and sugar cane. The only commercial plant introduced by a government agency was the plant of tobacco.

Church and state were inseparably linked in Spanish policy, with the state assuming responsibility for religious establishments. One of Spain's objectives in colonialization of the Philippines was the conversion of the local population to Christianity. The work of conversion was facilitated by the disunity and insignificance of other organized religions, except for Islam, which was still predominant in the southwest. The pageantry of the church had a wide appeal, reinforced by the incorporation of indigenous social customs into religious observances. The eventual outcome was a new Christian majority, from which the Muslims of western Mindanao and the upland tribal and animistic peoples of Luzon remained detached and alienated (Ethnic groups such as the Ifugaos of the Cordillera region and the Mangyans of Mindoro).

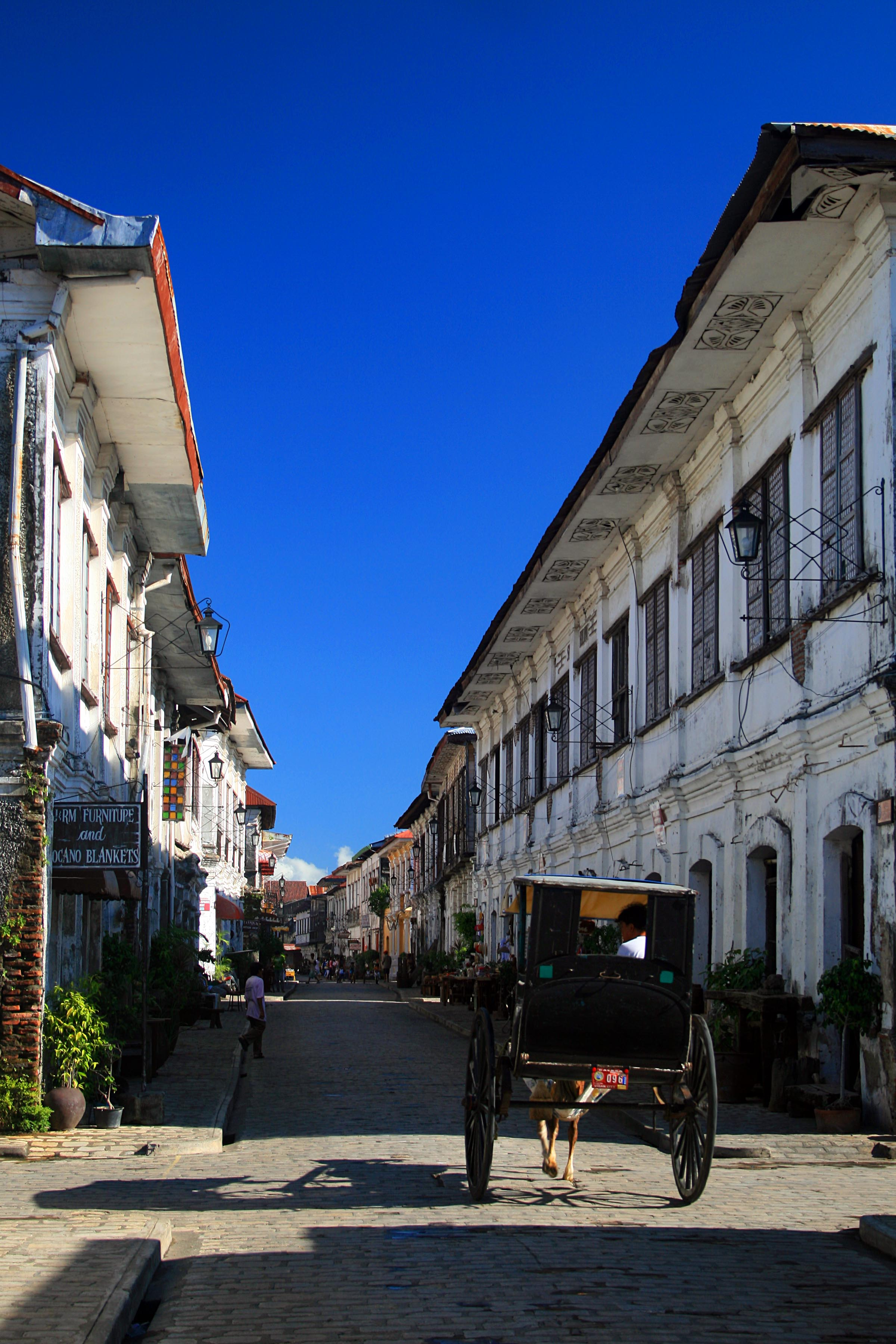
Villa Fernandina de Vigan founded by the Mexican conquistador Juan de Salcedo.

At the lower levels of administration, the Spanish built on traditional village organization by co-opting local leaders. This system of indirect rule helped create an indigenous upper class, called the principalía, who had local wealth, high status, and other privileges. This perpetuated an oligarchic system of local control. Among the most significant changes under Spanish rule was that the indigenous idea of communal use and ownership of land was replaced with the concept of private ownership and the conferring of titles on members of the principalía.

Around 1608 William Adams, an English navigator, contacted the interim governor of the Philippines, Rodrigo de Vivero y Velasco, on behalf of Tokugawa Ieyasu, who wished to establish direct trade contacts with New Spain. Friendly letters were exchanged, officially starting relations between Japan and New Spain. From 1565 to 1821, the Philippines was governed as a territory of the Viceroyalty of New Spain from Mexico, via the Royal Audiencia of Manila, and administered directly from Spain from 1821 after the Mexican revolution, until 1898.

The Manila galleons, constructed in Bicol and Cavite, were accompanied with a large naval escort as it traveled to and from Manila and Acapulco. The galleons sailed once or twice a year, between the 16th and 19th centuries. The Manila Galleons brought with them goods, settlers, and military reinforcements destined for the Philippines, from Latin America. The reverse voyage also brought Asian commercial products and immigrants to the western side of the Americas. Legally, the Manila Galleons were only allowed to trade between Mexico and the Philippines; however, illegal trade, commerce, and inter-migration, were happening in secret between the Philippines and other would-be nations in the Spanish Americas due to the tremendous demand and profitability of Asian products in Latin America. This clandestine defiance of Spanish colonial decrees forbidding trade continued all throughout the term of the Manila Galleons.

Geographic distribution and year of settlement of the Latin-American immigrant soldiers assigned to the Philippines in the 1600s.
Location	1603	1636	1642	1644	1654	1655	1670	1672
Manila	900	446	—	407	821	799	708	667
Fort Santiago	—	22	—	—	50	—	86	81
Cavite	—	70	—	—	89	—	225	211
Cagayan	46	80	—	—	—	—	155	155
Calamianes	—	—	—	—	—	—	73	73
Caraga	—	45	—	—	—	—	81	81
Cebu	86	50	—	—	—	—	135	135
Formosa	—	180	—	—	—	—	—	—
Moluccas	80	480	507	—	389	—	—	—
Otón	66	50	—	—	—	—	169	169
Zamboanga	—	210	—	—	184	—	—	—
Other	255	—	—	—	—	—	—	—
	—	—	—	—	—	—	—	—
Total Reinforcements	1,533	1,633	2,067	2,085	n/a	n/a	1,632	1,572

The Spanish military fought off various indigenous revolts and several external challenges, especially from the British, Dutch, and Portuguese and Chinese pirates. Christian missionaries converted most of the lowland inhabitants to Christianity and founded schools, universities, and hospitals. In 1863 a Spanish decree introduced education, establishing public schooling in Spanish.

In 1646, a series of five naval actions known as the Battles of La Naval de Manila was fought between the forces of Spain and the Dutch Republic, as part of the Eighty Years' War. Although the Spanish forces consisted of just two Manila galleons and a galley with crews composed mainly of Filipino volunteers, against three separate Dutch squadrons, totaling eighteen ships, the Dutch squadrons were severely defeated in all fronts by the Spanish-Filipino forces, forcing the Dutch to abandon their plans for an invasion of the Philippines.

In 1687, Isaac Newton included an explicit reference to the Philippines in his classic Philosophiæ Naturalis Principia Mathematica by mentioning Leuconia, the ancient Ptolemaic name for the Philippines.

=== Spanish rule during the 18th century ===
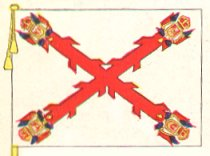
Coat of arms of Manila were at the corners of the Cross of Burgundy in the Spanish-Filipino battle standard.

Colonial income derived mainly from entrepôt trade: The Manila Galleons sailing from the port of Manila to the port of Acapulco on the west coast of Mexico brought shipments of silver bullion, and minted coin that were exchanged for return cargoes of Asian, and Pacific products. A total of 110 Manila galleons set sail in the 250 years of the Manila-Acapulco galleon trade (1565 to 1815). There was no direct trade with Spain until 1766.

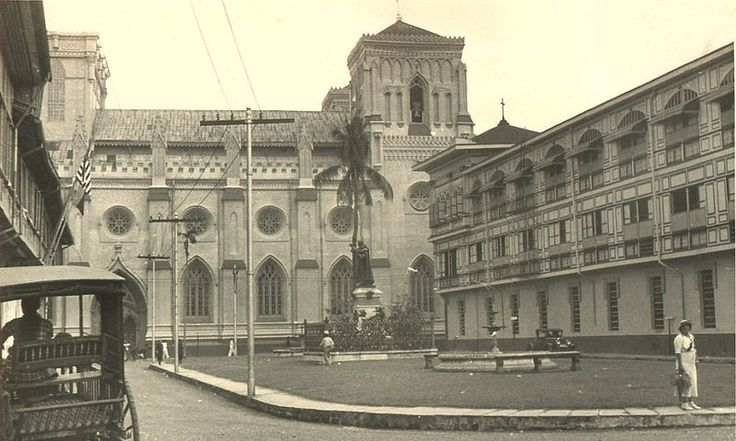
Plaza Santo Tomas in Intramuros, Manila; where the Santo Domingo Church, Colegio de Santa Rosa and the original University of Santo Tomas were built during the Spanish era.

The Philippines was never profitable as a colony during Spanish rule, and the long war against the Dutch from the West, in the 17th century together with the intermittent conflict with the Muslims in the South and combating Japanese Wokou piracy from the North nearly bankrupted the colonial treasury. Furthermore, the state of near constant war caused a high death and desertion rate among the Mestizo and Indio (Native American) soldiers sent from Mexico and Peru that were stationed in the Philippines. The high death and desertion rate also applied to the native Filipino warriors conscripted by Spain, to fight in battles all across the archipelago. The repeated wars, lack of wages, and near starvation were so intense, almost half of the soldiers sent from Latin America either died or fled to the countryside to live as vagabonds among the rebellious natives or escaped enslaved Indians (from India) where they race-mixed through rape or prostitution, further blurring the racial caste system Spain tried hard to maintain. Mixed Spanish-Filipino descent may be more common than expected as many Spaniards often had Filipino concubines and mistresses, and they frequently produced children out of wedlock. These circumstances contributed to the increasing difficulty of governing the Philippines. The Royal Fiscal of Manila wrote a letter to King Charles III of Spain in which he advises to abandon the colony, but the religious orders opposed this since they considered the Philippines a launching pad for the conversion of the Far East.

The Philippines survived on an annual subsidy paid by the Spanish Crown and often procured from taxes and profits accrued by the Viceroyalty of New Spain (Mexico), and the 200-year-old fortifications at Manila had not been improved much since first built by the Spanish. This was one of the circumstances that made possible the brief British occupation of Manila between 1762 and 1764.

==== British occupation (1762–1764) ====
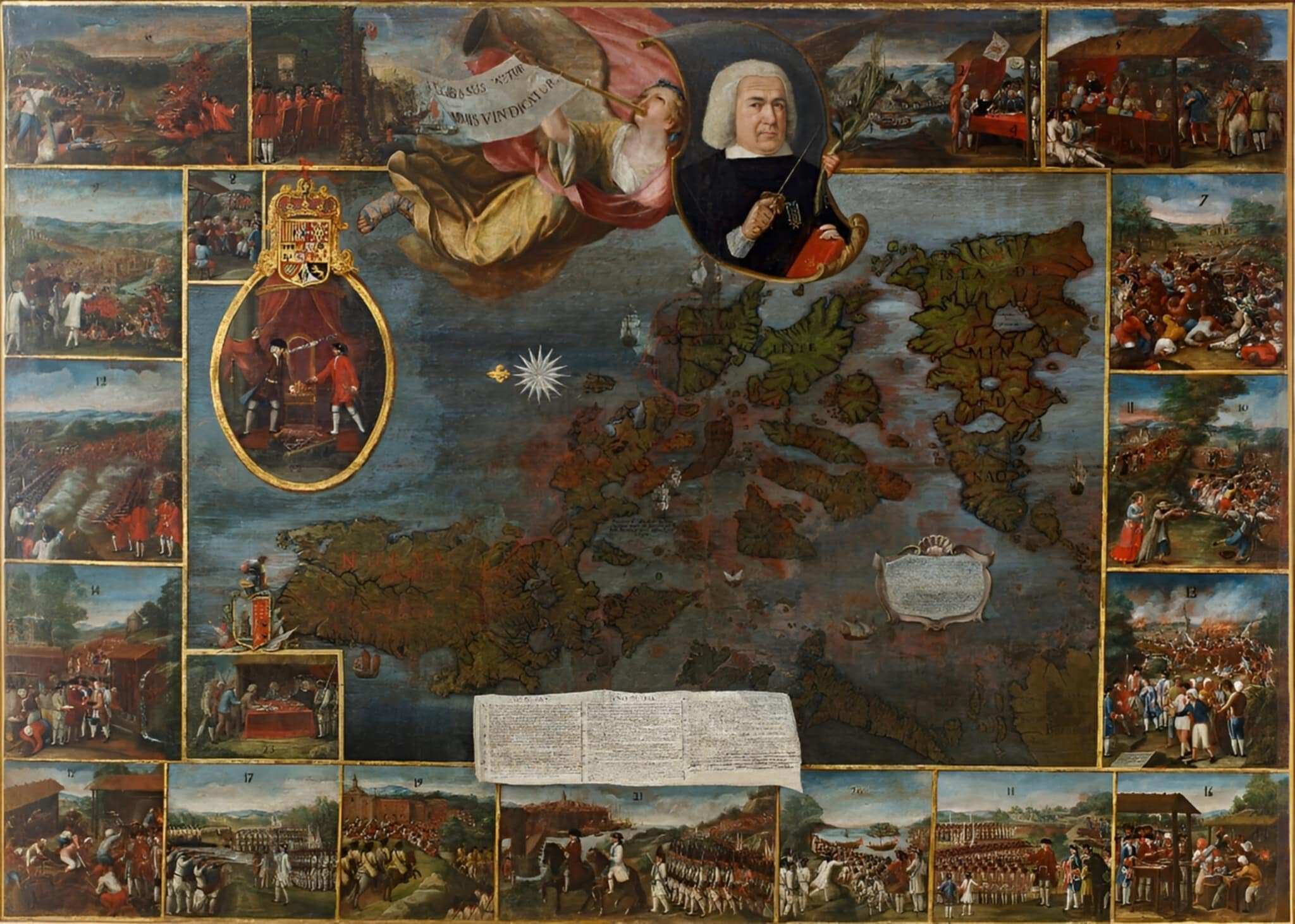
"Allegory of the Defense of the Philippines" honors Don Simón de Anda y Salazar.

Britain declared war against Spain on January 4, 1762, and on September 24, 1762, a force of British Army regulars and British East India Company soldiers, supported by the ships and men of the East Indies Squadron of the British Royal Navy, sailed into Manila Bay from Madras, India. Manila was besieged and fell to the British on October 4, 1762.

Outside of Manila, the Spanish leader Simón de Anda y Salazar organized a militia of 10,000 mostly from Pampanga to resist British attempts to extend their conquest outside Manila. Anda y Salazar established his headquarters first in Bulacan, then in Bacolor. After a number of skirmishes and failed attempts to support Filipino uprisings, the British command admitted to the War Secretary in London that the Spanish were "in full possession of the country". The occupation of Manila ended in April 1764 as agreed to in the peace negotiations for the Seven Years' War in Europe. The Spanish then persecuted the Binondo Chinese community for its role in aiding the British. An unknown number of Indian soldiers known as sepoys, who came with the British, deserted and settled in nearby Cainta, Rizal, which explains the uniquely Indian features of generations of Cainta residents.

==== Spanish rule in the second part of the 18th century ====
A view of the walled city of Intramuros and Manila Bay from the suburbs, drawn by Fernando Brambila during the Malaspina Expedition, c. 1792

In 1766 direct communication was established with Spain and trade with Europe through a national ship based on Spain. In 1774, colonial officers from Bulacan, Tondo, Laguna de Bay, and other areas surrounding Manila reported with consternation that discharged soldiers and deserters (from Mexico, Spain and Peru) during the British occupation were providing the indios military training for the weapons that had been disseminated all over the territory during the war. Expeditions from Spain were administered since 1785 by the Real Compañía de Filipinas, which was granted a monopoly of trade between Spain and the islands that lasted until 1834, when the company was terminated by the Spanish crown due to poor management and financial losses. About this time, Governor-General Anda complained that the Latin-American and Spanish soldiers sent to the Philippines had dispersed "all over the islands, even the most distant, looking for subsistence".

Illustration of the Parián (the Chinese quarter) in colonial Manila, sketched by Juan Ravenet during the Malaspina Expedition in 1792

In 1780, direct trade between Manila, Philippines at Asia; and Callao, Peru; in South America, was officially approved by the Spanish King, and organized by the Royal Philippine Company, leading to much immigration of Filipinos to Peru and Peruvians to the Philippines. In 1781, Governor-General José Basco y Vargas established the Economic Society of the Friends of the Country. The Philippines was administered from the Viceroyalty of New Spain until the independence to Mexico in 1821 necessitated the direct rule from Spain of the Philippines from that year.

In the late 1700s to early 1800s, Joaquín Martínez de Zúñiga, an Agustinian Friar from Spain, in his Two Volume Book: "Estadismo de las islas Filipinas" compiled a census of the Spanish-Philippines based on the tribute counts (Which represented an average family of seven to ten children and two parents, per tribute) and came upon the following statistics:

Data reported for the 1700s-1800s as divided by ethnicity and province
Province	Native Tributes	Spanish Mestizo Tributes	All Tributes (Note: Including others such as Latin-Americans and Chinese-Mestizos, pure Chinese paid tribute but were not Philippine citizens as they were transients who returned to China, and Spaniards were exempt)
Tondo	14,437-1/2	3,528	27,897-7
Cavite	5,724-1/2	859	9,132-4
Laguna	14,392-1/2	336	19,448-6
Batangas	15,014	451	21,579-7
Mindoro	3,165	3-1/2	4,000-8
Bulacan	16,586-1/2	2,007	25,760-5
Pampanga	16,604-1/2	2,641	27,358-1
Bataan	3,082	619	5,433
Zambales	1,136	73	4,389
Ilocos	44,852-1/2	631	68,856
Pangasinan	19,836	719-1/2	25,366
Cagayan	9,888	0	11,244-6
Camarines	19,686-1/2	154-1/2	24,994
Albay	12,339	146	16,093
Tayabas	7,396	12	9,228
Cebu	28,112-1/2	625	28,863
Samar	3,042	103	4,060
Leyte	7,678	37-1/2	10,011
Caraga	3,497	0	4,977
Misamis	1,278	0	1,674
Negros Island	5,741	0	7,176
Iloilo	29,723	166	37,760
Capiz	11,459	89	14,867
Antique	9,228	0	11,620
Calamianes	2,289	0	3,161
TOTAL	299,049	13,201	424,992-16

The Spanish-Filipino population as a proportion of the provinces widely varied; with as high as 19% of the population of Tondo province (The most populous province and former name of Manila), to Pampanga 13.7%, Cavite at 13%, Laguna 2.28%, Batangas 3%, Bulacan 10.79%, Bataan 16.72%, Ilocos 1.38%, Pangasinan 3.49%, Albay 1.16%, Cebu 2.17%, Samar 3.27%, Iloilo 1%, Capiz 1%, Bicol 20%, and Zamboanga 40%. According to the data, in the Archdiocese of Manila which administers much of Luzon under it, about 10% of the population was Spanish-Filipino. Summing up all the provinces including those with no Spanish Filipinos, all in all, in the total population of the Philippines, Spanish Filipinos and mixed Spanish-Filipinos composed 5% of the population.

The book, "Intercolonial Intimacies Relinking Latin/o America to the Philippines, 1898–1964 By Paula C. Park" citing "Forzados y reclutas: los criollos novohispanos en Asia (1756-1808)" gave a higher number of later Mexican soldier-immigrants to the Philippines, pegging the number at 35,000 immigrants in the 1700s, in a Philippine population which was only around 1.5 Million, thus forming 2.33% of the population.

Meanwhile, government records show that 20% of the Philippines' total population were either pure Chinese or Mixed Chinese-Filipinos

=== Spanish rule during the 19th century ===
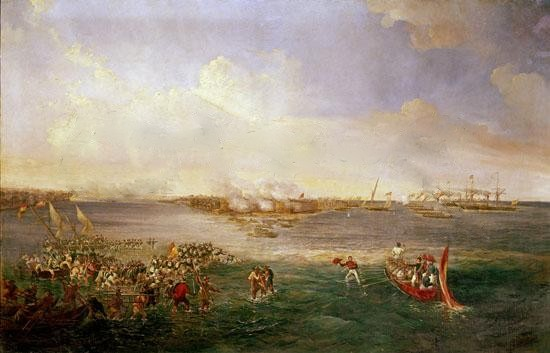
The landing of the Spanish expedition to Sulu by Antonio Brugada.

The Philippines was included in the vast territory of the Kingdom of Spain, in the first constitution of Spain promulgated in Cadiz in 1812. It was never a colony as modern-day historical literature would say, but an overseas region in Asia (Spanish Constitution 1812). The Spanish Constitution of 1870 provides for the first autonomous community for "Archipelago Filipino" where all provinces in the Philippine Islands will be given the semi-independent home rule program.

In 1818; the general Native, Chinese-Filipino, and Spanish-Filipino, populations of the Philippines ballooned, and Buzeta and Bravo recorded these numbers in their general census.

Felipe Bravo Census Demographics (Albay, 1818)
Provinces	Pueblos	Native Families	Spanish Filipino Families	Negrito Families	Chinese Filipino Families
Albay	Albay, Cabicera	5,515		2	2
	Manito	240	4		
	Bacon	2,119	45		
	Cuba	2,162	52		
	Casiguran	1,025	28		
	Juban	396	18		
	Sorsogon	1,783	149		
	Bulusan	1,777	19		
	Bulan	714	16		
	Donsol	241			
	Quipia	269			
	Lilog	821	33	23	
	Bacacay	1,295	77		
	Malilipot	981	53		
	Tabaco	3,347	225		
	Malitao	2,844	241		
	Tibi	2,069	157	110	
	Lagonoy y su anejo	1,669	18	521	
	San Jose	1,829	114	470	
	Caramoan	641		72	
Total		31,737	1,249	1,198	2

Felipe Bravo Census Demographics (Isla De Ticao, 1818)
Provinces	Pueblos	Native Families	Spanish Filipino Families	Negrito Families	Chinese Filipino Families
Isla de Ticao	San Jacinto	266	8		
Total		266	8		

Felipe Bravo Census Demographics (Isla De Masbate, 1818)
Provinces	Pueblos	Native Families	Spanish Filipino Families	Negrito Families	Chinese Filipino Families
Isla de Masbate	Mobo	912	1		
Total		912	1		

Felipe Bravo Census Demographics (Isla De Catanduanes, 1818)
Provinces	Pueblos	Native Families	Spanish Filipino Families	Negrito Families	Chinese Filipino Families
Isla De Catanduanes	Virac	1,581	91		
	Calolbon	847	3		
	Eiga	847	3		
	Payo y sus anejos Bagamanoc y Ooc	644	17		
	Pandan y Caramoan	489	2		
Total		4,408	116		

Felipe Bravo Census Demographics (Antique, 1818)
Provinces	Pueblos	Native Families	Spanish Filipino Families	Chinese Filipino Families
Antique	San José de Buenavista, cabecera	5,925	6	
	San Pedro de Balbalan	2,247		
	Sibalom	4,665	2	
	Patnongon y su visita Coritan	2,097	3	
	Bugason	3,060	1	
	San Antonio de Nalupa, su anejo Culari y visitas Tibiao, Bitad, Tun, Bacafan y Batunan	2,542	19	
	Pandan	300		
	Antique	2,304	12	
	Dao	1,296	7	
	Cagayan Chico en la isla del mismo nombre	527		
Total	(Across the Province)	24,963	50	40

Felipe Bravo Census Demographics (Bataan, 1818)
Provinces	Pueblos	Native Families	Spanish Filipino Families	Moreno Filipino Families	Negro (Black) Filipino Families	Chinese Filipino Families
Bataan	Balanga, cabecera	1,608	12		18	8
	Abucay	1,406	20		3	5
	Samar	1,000	4		1	
	Orani	1,000	25			8
	Llana-Hermosa	716	1			
	San Juan de Dinalupijan	451	19		7	3
	Pilar	899				
	Mariveles y su visita Morong	1,522	3	1	5	
	Orion ú Odiong	1,550	8	2	18	3
Total		10,152	92	3	52	27

Felipe Bravo Census Demographics (Batangas, 1818)
Provinces	Pueblos	Native Families	Spanish Filipino Families	Chinese Filipino Families
Batangas	Balayan, cabecera.	4,521	22	
	Lian.	629	7	
	Nasugbů.	866		2
	Rosario	1,758	4	
	Santo Tomas.	1,256		
	San Pablo de los Montes	1,948	7	
	Taal	8,312		
	Baoan ó Banang	5,813		
	Batangas	6,889		
	San José	2,427		
	Tanauan.	2,106		
	Lipa	4,104		
Total		40,629	40	2

Felipe Bravo Census Demographics (Bulacan, 1818)
Provinces	Pueblos	Native Families	Spanish Filipino Families	Converted Negro Families	Chinese Filipino Families
Bulacan	Bulacan, cabecera.	5,200			
	Bigáa.	1,876			
	Guiguinto.	1,291			
	Malolos.	8,110			
	Paombon.	1,058			
	Hagonoy.	4,572			
	Calumpít.	2,628			
	Quingua.	2,912			
	San Isidro.	2,560			
	Baliuag.	4,296			
	San Rafael.	1,650	10		
	Angat.	5,441			
	San José.	219			
	Santa María de Pandi.	1,588	17		
	Bocaue.	2,550	88		2
	Marilao.	881	28	5	1
	Meycauayan.	2,375	46		
	Polo.	3,160	44		4
	Obando.	2,493			
Total		54,360	233	5	7

Felipe Bravo Census Demographics (Cagayan, 1818)
Province	Pueblo	Native Families	Spanish Filipino Families
Cagayan	Lal-lo, cabecera.	975	313
	Camalaniugan.	1,156	
	Piat y su visita.	899	
	Tabang..	201	
	Cabagan.	3,543	
	Malaveg con su visita Mabanaug.	524	
	Tuao..	1,393	
	Iguig y su visita Amulong.	403	
	Tuguegarao.	5,072	
	Aparri..	1,715	
	Abulug.	1,162	1
	San Juan y su visita Masi.	913	
	Nasiping y su visita Gataran.	573	
	Ilagan..	1,150	
	Gamú y su visita Furao.	586	16
	Tumauini.	827	
	Bugay..	299	
	Aritao..	580	
	Dupax.	867	6
	Bambang..	893	
	Bayombong.	771	
	Lumabang.	332	
	Bagabag y su Fuerza.	508	
	Carig y su Fortaleza el Sto. Niño.	305	
	Camarag.	488	
	Angadanan.	320	
	Cauayan.	318	
	Calaniugan.	135	
TOTAL		26,726	336

Felipe Bravo Census Demographics (Calamianes, 1818)
Province	Pueblo	Native Families	Spanish Filipino Families
Islas de Calamianes
Calamianes	Culion en la de Calamianes, Isla de Linacapan, e Isla de Coron.	1,044	2
Isla de Paragua
	Taytay, Silanga, Meitejet, Pancol, Guinlo, y Barbacan.	1,424	4
Islas de Dumaran y Agutay
	Isla y pueblo de Dumaran e Isla y pueblo de Agutay.	632	
Islas de Cuyo
	Isla y pueblo de Cuyo y su anejo, Canipo, e Isla de Pagaguayan.	2,430	25
TOTAL		5,530	31

Felipe Bravo Census Demographics (Camarines, 1818)
Province	Pueblo	Native Families	Spanish Filipino Families	Lacandula Families	Negro Filipinos	Chinese Filipinos
Partido de Vicol (Ciudad de Nueva-Caceres)
Camarines	Tabaco y Santa Cruz.	3,593	301		4	3
	Naga.	956				
	Camaligan.	1,388				
	Canaman.	1,589				
	Magarao ó Mangarao.	1,862				
	Bombom ó Bonbon.	1,245				
	Quipayo.	784				
	Calabanga.	1,174				
	Libmanan ó Libnanan.	1,490	1			
	Milaor.	1,902	7			
	San Fernando.	688	2			
	Minalabag.	901				
Partido de la Rinconada
	Bula.	471				
	Bao ó Baao.	1,538	37		4	
	Nabua.	2,612	2		2	
	Iriga.	2,040	1			
	Buhi ó Buji.	1,979	10			
	Bato.	495				
Partido de la Iriga
	Libon.	410	4			
	Polangui.	2,903	15			
	Ors ú Oas.	3,614				
	Ligao.	2,968	24			
	Guinobatan.	2,605	1			
	Camalig.	2,330	39		9	
	Cagsava.	2,870				
Monte Isaroc
	Pueblo y Mision de Manguirin.	160			629	
	Goa, Tigabon y Tinambag.	1,123		2	625	
Partido de la Contra-Costa
	Sipocot, Lupi y Ragay.	406				
	Daet.	1,449	26		10	
	Talisay.	1,055	2			
	Indan.	675	6			
	Paracale.	697	34			
	Mambulao.	950				
	Capalonga.	137			4	
TOTAL		50,762	512	2	1,287	3

Felipe Bravo Census Demographics (Capiz, 1818)
Province	Pueblo	Native Families	Spanish Filipino Families	Lacandula Families	Negro Filipino families	Chinese Filipino families
Capiz	Capiz y su visita Ibisan.	2,650				
	Panay.	2,275				
	Panitan.	1,485				
	Dumalag y sus visitas Dao y Tapas.	3,158				
	Dumarao.	2,600				
	Mambusao y sus visitas Sigma y Jamindan.	1,924	13			
	Batan y su visita Sapiang.	2,255	56			
	Banga y su visita Madalag.	1,579	8			
	Malinao.	1,487	11			
	Calibo y su visita Macao.	2,700	167			
	Ibajay.	1,268	30			
Isla de Romblon
	Romblon.	1,514	15			
Isla de Sibuyan
	Cauit, Pagalar, y Cajidiocan.	1,114				
Isla de Banton
	Banton.					
Isla de Tablas
	Guintinguian, Aghagacay, Odiongan, Lanan, y Loog.					
Isla de Simara
	San José, Coloncolon.					
Isla del Maestre de Campo
	Sibali.					
TOTAL		26,009	285			

Felipe Bravo Census Demographics (Caraga, 1818)
Province	Pueblo	Native Families	Spanish Filipino Families	Lacandula Families	Negro Filipino families	Chinese Filipino families
Distrito de Surigao y Siargao
Caraga	Surigao (cabecera), Tagauan, Gigaquit ó Higaguit, Cabubungan, Isla y pueblo de Dinagat, Caco en la isla de Siargao, Dapa en dicha isla, Cabuntug en la misma isla, Sapao en la citada isla.	2,475	25			
Distrito de Butuan y Talacogon
	Butuan, Habungan, Tabay, Maynio, Talacogon.	1,593	10			
Distrito de Cantilan y Mision de San Juan
	Lutao, Hingoog, Cantilan, Tago, Tandac, Lianga y la Mision de San Juan.	1,155				
Distrito de Bislic y Mision de Caraga
	Jinatuan, Bislic, Catel, Bagangan y la Mision de Caraga.	955				
TOTAL		6,178	35			

Felipe Bravo Census Demographics (Cavite, 1818)
Province	Pueblo	Native Families	Spanish Filipino Families	Lacandula Families	Negro Filipino families	Morenos	Chinese Filipino families
Cavite	Plaza y puerto de Cavite.	221	153			5	100
	San Roque.	3,906	443			3	35
	Cavite viejo.	1,855	55				4
	Bacood ó Bacor.	1,729	19				4
	San Francisco de Malabon.	1,510	69				3
	Santa Cruz de Malabon.	2,090	3			1	2
	Pueblo y Hacienda de Nait.	942	3			4	2
	Marigondon.	2,043					3
	Indan.	2,759	36				2
	Silang.	2,255	6			1	4
	Imus.	2,015	125				5
TOTAL		21,325	912			14	164

Felipe Bravo Census Demographics (Cebu, 1818)
Province	Pueblo	Native Families	Spanish Filipino Families	Lacandula Families	Negro Filipino families	Chinese Filipino families
Isla de Cebu
Cebu	Cabecera, El Sto. Nombre de Jesus.	868	255			
	Parian, Yutaos y Sogod con la visita de este, Simugui.	1,795	109			
	San Nicolás y sus visits Talisay, Lipata, Tansan, y Pitao.	2,420				
	Opon y Talamban.	2,850				
	Mandave ó Mandaui.	2,729	20			
	Danao y Catmon.	2,656	57			
	Barili y sus visitas Duman, Jod, Malhual, Coston, Badian y Taiuran.	1,943	14			
	Samboan y sus visitas Jiratilan, Malabuyot, y Taburan.	2,496	69			
	Bolojon y sus visitas Tayon, Calob, Mambuji y Yunan.	2,420				
	Dalaguete.	2,556				
	Argao y Carcar.	3,250				
Isla de Bantayan
	Bantayan y sus visitas Octon y Davis, Daan, Bantayan y sus visits Sogod y Cavit.	2,169	75			
Isla de Siquijor
	Siquijor y su visita Canoan.	2,450	46			
Isla de Bohol
	Inabangan y sus visitas Pampan, Corte, Taoran, Canogon, Tubigon, Ipil, Talibon, Tabigui, Inbay, y Cabulao.	1,815	41			
	Gindulman y sus visitas Quimale y Cugton.	1,500	6			
	Jagna.	3,255				
	Dimiao.	2,016				
	Loay.	1,614	5			
	Lobog y su anejo S. Isidro.	3,852				
	Baclayon.	3,549	5			
	Tagbilaran.	2,370	2			
	Pimin-vitan.	1,414				
	Malabohoo.	2,269				
	Loon y su visita Catarbacan.	1,990				
	Calape y sus visitas Bintig y Mondoog.	1,932				
Isla de Davis
	Davis.	2,055	9			
	Panglao.	1,350				
Isla de Camotes
	Poro y sus visitas (administración de Mandave).					
TOTAL		60,305	638			

Felipe Bravo Census Demographics (Ilocos Norte, 1818)
Province	Pueblo	Native Families	Spanish Filipino Families	Lacandula Families	Negro Filipino families	Chinese Filipino families
Ilocos Norte	Bangui.	1,449	5			
	Nagpartian.	423				
	Pasuquin.	1,530				
	Bacarra.	4,901				
	Vintar.	2,064				
	Sarrat ó San Miguel de Cuning.	2,755				
	Pigdig y su visita Santiago.	4,015				
	Dingras.	4,559				
	Laoag.	12,055				
	San Nicolás.	3,498				
	Batac.	7,026				
	Paoay.	7,447				
	Badoc.	3,356				
TOTAL		55,078	5			

Felipe Bravo Census Demographics (Ilocos Sur, 1818)
Province	Pueblo	Native Families	Spanish Filipino Families	Lacandula Families	Negro Filipino families	Chinese Filipino families
Ilocos Sur	Sinait.	2,625				
	Cabugao.	3,595				
	Lapoc.	1,791				
	Masingal.	2,740				
	Bantay y su visita San Ildefonso.	5,535				
	Santo Domingo.	2,912	36			
	San Vicente Ferrer.	2,113	10			
	Santa Catalina.	4,292				
	Vigan.	6,849	421			14
	Santa Catalina V. y M.	1,750				
	Narvacan.	4,185				
	Santa Maria.	2,985				
	San Esteban.	819				
	Santiago.	1,023				
	Candong.	5,709				
	Santa Lucia y su visita Santa Cruz con la mision de Ronda.	3,690				
	Tagudin y Ous.	2,620				
	Mision llamada Sevilla.					
	Mision de Argaguinan.					
	Bangas y sus misiones.	2,582				
	Villa-Cruz y San Rafael.					
	Namacpacan.	2,564				
	Balaoan.	2,703				
Distrito del Abra
	Tayum en el Abra.	1,307	4			
	Bangued en idem.	1,836	9			
TOTAL		61,397	530			14

Felipe Bravo Census Demographics (Iloilo, 1818)
Province	Pueblo	Native Families	Spanish Filipino Families	Lacandula Families	Negro Filipino families	Chinese Filipino families
Iloilo	Iloilo (cabecera) y Guimaras.	1,594	103			
	Molo.	3,457	23			
	Mandurrio.	5,966				
	Barotac, Asuy y Batag.	1,200				
	Ooton.	5,395				
	Tigbauan.	3,248				
	Guimbal y Tabungan.	4,209				
	Miagao.	4,096				
	San Joaquin.	1,180				
	Igbaras.	3,329				
	Camando.	1,974				
	Alimodian y San Miguel.	4,230				
	Ma-asin.	2,880				
	Cabatuan.	6,470				
	Xaro.	6,871				
	Santa Bárbara.	3,600				
	Janiuay.	4,158				
	Lambuso.	1,040				
	Calinog.	960				
	Pasi y Abaca.	2,637				
	Laglag y Diale.	2,252				
	Pototan.	3,000				
	Dumangas, Anilao, Banate y Barotac.	3,200				
TOTALS		77,862	126			

Felipe Bravo Census Demographics (Laguna, 1818)
Province	Pueblo	Native Families	Spanish Filipino Families	Lacandula Families	Negro Filipino families	Morenos	Chinese Filipino families
Laguna	Pagsanjan, cabecera.	4,785	7				
	Lumban.	1,983					
	Paete.	1,088					
	Longos con su anejo San Antonio del Monte.	944					
	Paquil.	628					
	Panguil.	1,030					
	Siniloan.	1,911					
	Mavitac.	525					
	Santa Maria Caboan.	257					
	Cavioli.	854					
	Majayjay.	4,948					
	Lilio.	2,168					
	Nagcarlan.	2,557					
	Santa Cruz.	2,528					
	Bay.	668					
	Pueblo y hacienda de Calauang.	610	2				
	Pila.	1,117	3				
	Los Baños.	460					5
	Calamba.	959	4				15
	Cabuyao.	1,755			1		14
	Santa Rosa.	1,760					9
	Biñan.	2,598	8		2	2	
	San Pedro Tunasau.	1,112	2			1	
	Pililla.	1,096					
	Tanay.	1,352					
	Binangonan de Bay.	1,234					
	Moron.	1,747					
	Baras.	486	3				
	Pueblo y hacienda de Angono.	513	2		2	3	
TOTAL		40,239	34		5	6	41

Felipe Bravo Census Demographics (Leyte, 1818)
Province	Pueblo	Native Families	Spanish Filipino Families	Lacandula Families	Negro Filipino families	Chinese Filipino families
Leyte	Taclovan (cabecera) y Palo.	2,290	11			
	Tanauan.	2,155	29			
	Dulag y Abuyog.	2,229	14			
	Barayuen, Haro y Alang-alang.	864				
	Barugo y San Miguel.	626				
	Carigara y su visita Leyte.	2,253				
	Palompon, Ogmug y Baybay.	826				
	Hilongos, Bato, Matalom, y Cajanguaan.	1,231	2			
	Indan, Dagami, e Isla de Panamao.	1,978				
Islas de Biliran y Maripipi
	Biliran, Isla de Maripipi, y Maripipi.	538				
Isla de Panahon y Costa Sur
	Isla de Panahon, Ma-asin, Sogod, Cabalian, y Liloan.	1,450				
TOTALES		16,244	56			

Felipe Bravo Census Demographics (Mariana Islands, 1818)
Provinces	Pueblos	Native Citizens	Spanish Citizen
Marianas Islands	(Across the Province in General)	7,555	160

Felipe Bravo Census Demographics (Mindoro, 1818)
Province	Pueblo	Number of Native Families	Number of Spanish Filipino Families	Lacandula Families	Negro Filipino families	Morenos	Chinese Filipino families
Mindoro	Calapan (cabecera) y sus anejos Baco, Sabuan, Abra de Ilog y Dongon.	970	8				
	Naujan y sus anejos Pola, Pinamalayan, Mamalay, Manaol, Bulalacao, Bongabon, Manjao, Manguirin y la Isla de Ilin.	924	6				
Isla de Marinduque
	Santa Cruz de Napo.	1,600	1				
	Boac.	1,908	31		4		
	Gazan.	316	1		1		
Isla de Luban
	Luban.	1,699					
TOTAL		7,455	47		5		

Felipe Bravo Census Demographics (Misamis)
Province	Pueblo	Number of Native Families	Number of Spanish Filipino Families	Lacandula Families	Negro Filipino families	Morenos	Chinese Filipino families
Partido de Misamis
Misamis	Plaza y presidio de Misamis, y su anejo Loculan.	334					
	Presidio de Iligan, con su anejo Initao.	169					
Partido de Dapitan
	Dapitan, y su visita San Lorenzo de Ilaya.	666	2				
	Lobungan, y sus visitas Dipolog, Piao, Dohinog, y Dicayo.	701					
Partido de Cagayan
	Cagayan, y sus visitas Iponau, Mulingan, Agusan, Cagaloan, Lasaan, Balingasay, Salay, Quinoquitan ó Bacay, Mubijut, y la Mision de Pinangudan.	3,177	1				
Isla de Camiguin (Partido de Catarman)
	Catarman, y sus visitas Mambujao, Guinsiliban, y Sagay.	1,693	35				
TOTAL		6,740	38				

Felipe Bravo Census Demographics (Samar, 1818)
Provinces	Pueblos	Native Families	Spanish Filipino Families	Negrito Families	Chinese Filipino Families
Samar	Samar island, in general.	16,671	174		

Felipe Bravo Census Demographics (Zamboanga, 1818)
Provinces	Pueblos	Native Citizens	Spanish Filipino Soldiers	Kapampangan Soldiers	Spanish and Mexican Citizens
Zamboanga	Zamboanga-province and peninsula .	8,640	300	100	A very large but unknown amount of the civilian population, they are mostly employed in the navy and shipping.

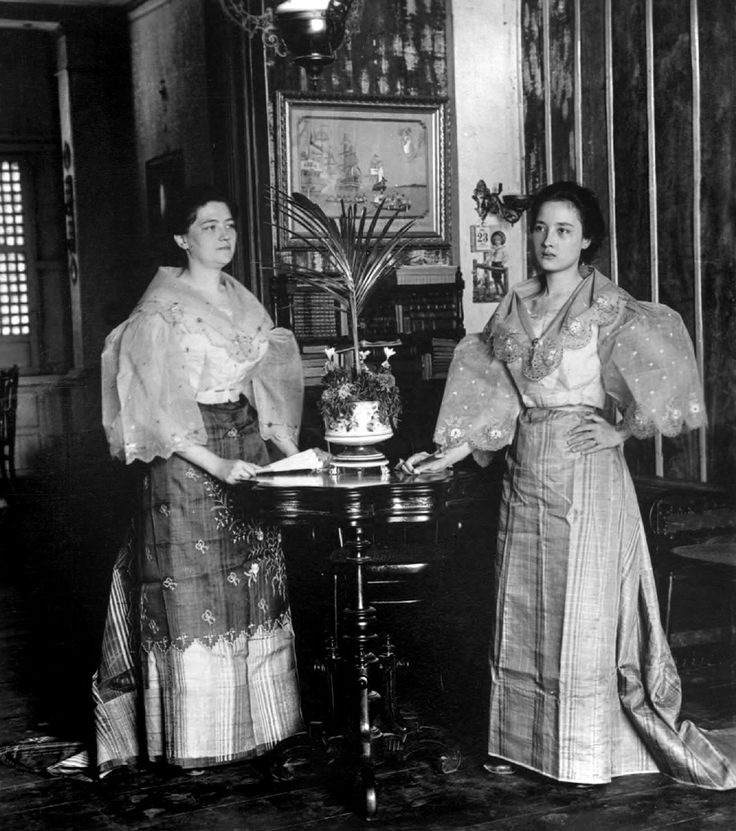
Filipina mestiza women

During the 19th century Spain invested heavily in education and infrastructure. Through the Education Decree of December 20, 1863, Queen Isabella II of Spain decreed the establishment of a free public school system that used Spanish as the language of instruction, leading to increasing numbers of educated Filipinos. Additionally, the opening of the Suez Canal in 1869 cut travel time to Spain, which facilitated the rise of the ilustrados, an enlightened class of Spanish-Filipinos that had been able to enroll in Spanish and European universities.

A great number of infrastructure projects were undertaken during the 19th century that put the Philippine economy and standard of living ahead of most of its Asian neighbors and even many European countries at that time. Among them were a railway system for Luzon, a tramcar network for Manila, and Asia's first steel suspension bridge Puente Claveria, later called Puente Colgante.

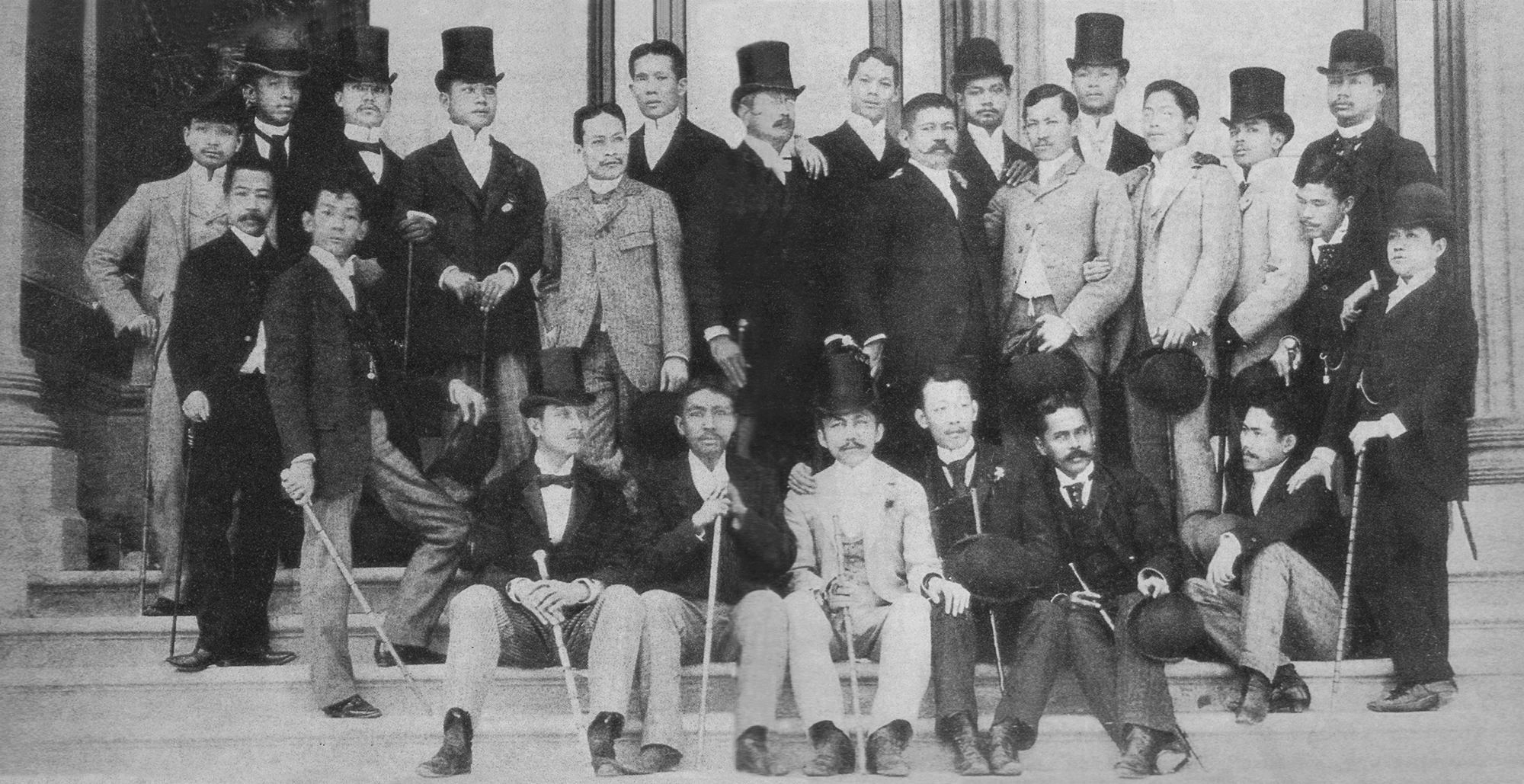
Ilustrados in Madrid, c. 1890

On August 1, 1851, the Banco Español-Filipino de Isabel II was established to attend the needs of the rapid economic boom, that had greatly increased its pace since the 1800s as a result of a new economy based on a rational exploitation of the agricultural resources of the islands. The increase in textile fiber crops such as abacá, oil products derived from the coconut, indigo, that was growing in demand, etc., generated an increase in money supply that led to the creation of the bank. Banco Español-Filipino was also granted the power to print a Philippine-specific currency (the Philippine peso) for the first time (before 1851, many currencies were used, mostly the pieces of eight).

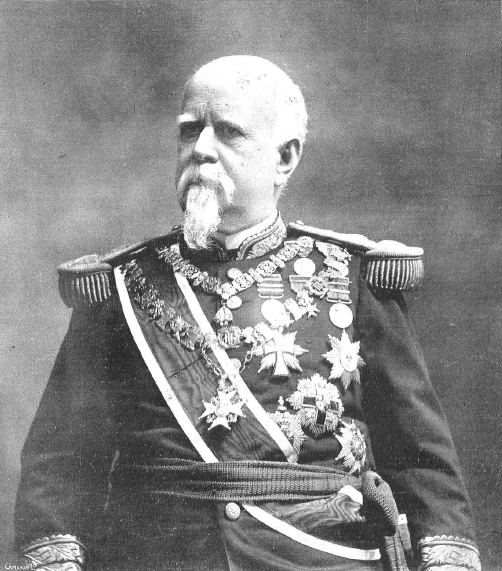
Filipino Marcelo Azcárraga Palmero born in Manila to a Vizcayan Spaniard who was a peninsulares general in the Philippines José de Azcárraga and a Filipina mestiza María Palmero. He became the Prime minister of Spain.

Spanish Manila was seen in the 19th century as a model of colonial governance that effectively put the interests of the original inhabitants of the islands before those of the colonial power. As John Crawfurd put it in its History of the Indian Archipelago, in all of Asia the "Philippines alone did improve in civilization, wealth, and populousness under the colonial rule" of a foreign power. John Bowring, Governor General of British Hong Kong from 1856 to 1860, wrote after his trip to Manila:

Credit is certainly due to Spain for having bettered the condition of a people who, though comparatively highly civilized, yet being continually distracted by petty wars, had sunk into a disordered and uncultivated state. The inhabitants of these beautiful Islands upon the whole, may well be considered to have lived as comfortably during the last hundred years, protected from all external enemies and governed by mild laws vis-a-vis those from any other tropical country under native or European sway, owing in some measure, to the frequently discussed peculiar (Spanish) circumstances which protect the interests of the natives.

In The Inhabitants of the Philippines, Frederick Henry Sawyer wrote:

Until an inept bureaucracy was substituted for the old paternal rule, and the revenue quadrupled by increased taxation, the Filipinos were as happy a community as could be found in any colony. The population greatly multiplied; they lived in competence, if not in affluence; cultivation was extended, and the exports steadily increased. [...] Let us be just; what British, French, or Dutch colony, populated by natives can compare with the Philippines as they were until 1895?.

The first official census in the Philippines was carried out in 1878. The colony's population as of December 31, 1877, was recorded at 5,567,685 persons. This was followed by the 1887 census that yielded a count of 6,984,727, while that of 1898 yielded 7,832,719 inhabitants.

=== Latin-American revolutions and direct Spanish rule ===
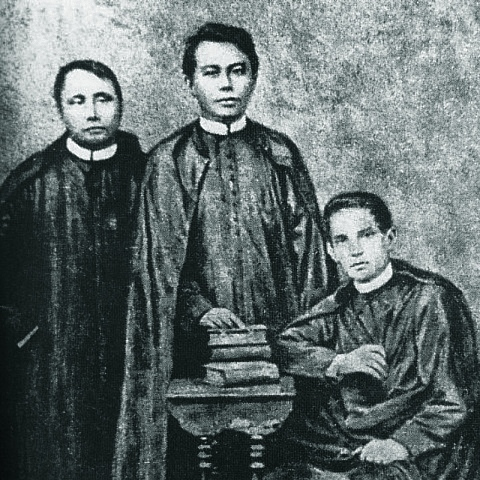
Filipino Mestizo priests Mariano Gomez, José Burgos, and Jacinto Zamora collectively known as the Gomburza was wrongly executed after 1872 Cavite mutiny. It sparked the movements that would later bring about the revolution that would end Spain's control of the archipelago.

In the Americas; overseas Filipinos were involved in several anti-colonial movements, Filomeno V. Aguilar Jr. in his paper: "Manilamen and seafaring: engaging the maritime world beyond the Spanish realm", stated therein that Filipinos who were internationally called Manilamen were active in the navies and armies of the world even after the era of the Manila Galleons such as the case of the Argentine war of independence wherein an Argentinian of French descent, Hypolite Bouchard, laid siege to Monterey California as a privateer for the Argentine army. His second ship, the Santa Rosa, which was captained by the American Peter Corney, had a multi-ethnic crew which included Filipinos. It has been proposed that those Filipinos were recruited in San Blas, an alternative port to Acapulco Mexico where several Filipinos had settled during the Manila-Acapulco Galleon trade era. Argentinian-Philippine relations can be traced even earlier since the Philippines already received immigrants from South America, like the soldier Juan Fermín de San Martín, who was the brother of the leader of the Argentinian Revolution Jose de San Martin. Likewise, in Mexico, about 200 Filipinos were recruited by Miguel Hidalgo in his revolution against Spain, the most prominent of which was the Manila-born Ramon Fabié afterwards when the revolution was continued by President Guerrero, General Isidoro Montes de Oca, another Filipino-Mexican, had participated in the Mexican Revolutionary war against Spain too. The recent participation of overseas Filipinos in Anti-Imperial wars in the Americas started even earlier when Filipinos in the settlement of Saint Malo, Louisiana assisted the United States in the defense of New Orleans during the War of 1812.

Upon Mexican independence, the Filipinos had such an effect on Mexico that there were plans among the newly independent Mexicans to help the Filipinos revolt against Spain too. There was even a secret memorandum from the Mexican government which read:

Now that we Mexicans have fortunately obtained our independence by revolution against Spanish rule, it is our solemn duty to help the less fortunate countries especially the Philippines, with whom our country has had the most intimate relations during the last two centuries and a half. We should send secret agents with a message to their inhabitants to rise in revolution against Spain and that we shall give them financial and military assistance to win their freedom. Should the Philippines succeed in gaining her independence from Spain, we must felicitate her warmly and from an alliance of amity and commerce with her as a sister nation. Moreover, we must resume the intimate Mexico-Philippine relations, as they were during the halcyon days of the Acapulco-Manila galleon trade.

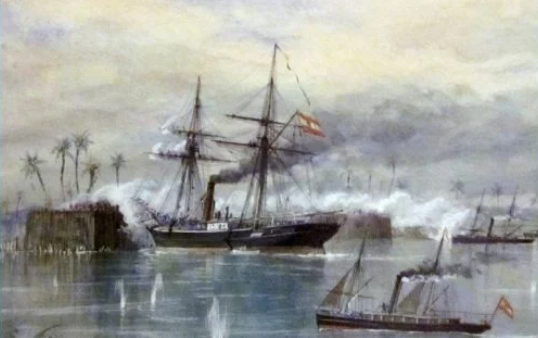
Spanish forces under Casto Méndez Núñez attacking a Moro fort on the Mindanao River at Pagalungan on 17 November 1861, during the Spanish–Moro conflict

Likewise, in this period, overseas Filipinos were also active in the Asia-Pacific especially in China and Indochina. During the Taiping rebellion, Frederick Townsend Ward had a militia employing foreigners to quell the rebellion for the Qing government, at first he hired American and European adventurers but they proved unruly, while recruiting for better troops, he met his aide-de-camp, Vincente (Vicente?) Macanaya, who was twenty three years old in 1860 and was part of the large Filipino population then living in Shanghai, who "were handy on board ships and more than a little troublesome on land", as Caleb Carr journalistically put it. Smith, another writer about China also notes in his book: "Mercenaries and Mandarins" that Manilamen were "Reputed to be brave and fierce fighters" and "were plentiful in Shanghai and always eager for action". During this Taiping rebellion, by July 1860, Townsend Ward's force of Manilamen ranging from one to two hundred mercenaries successfully assaulted Sung-Chiang Prefecture. Thus, while the Philippines was slowly engendered with revolutionary fervour being suppressed by Spain, overseas Filipinos have had an active role in the military and naval engagements of various nations in the Americas and Asia-Pacific. Soldiers from the Philippines were recruited by France, which was allied to Spain, to initially protect Indo-Chinese Christian converts who were persecuted by their native governments, and later, for an actual conquest of Vietnam and Laos, as well as the establishment of the Protectorate of Cambodia which was liberated from Thai invasions and re-established as a vassal-state of France with the combined Franco-Spanish-Filipino forces, creating French Cochinchina which was governed from the former Cambodian and now Vietnamese city of Saigon.

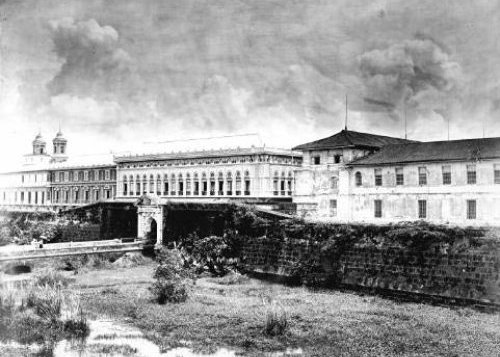
Santa Lucia Gate, Intramuros, Manila overlooking San Agustin, San Ignacio Church belltowers and Ateneo de Manila where Jose Rizal once studied.

The Criollo and Latino dissatisfaction against the Peninsulares (Spaniards direct from Spain), spurred by their love of the land and their suffering people, had a justified hatred against the exploitative Peninsulares who were only appointed to high positions due to their race and unflinching loyalty to the homeland. This resulted in the 1823 uprising of Andres Novales, a Philippine born soldier of Mexican descent, who earned great fame in richer Spain but chose to return to serve in poorer Philippines. He was supported by local soldiers as well as former officers in the Spanish army of the Philippines who were primarily from the now sovereign Mexico as well as the freshly independent nations of Colombia, Venezuela, Peru, Chile, Argentina and Costa Rica. The uprising was brutally suppressed, but it foreshadowed the 1872 Cavite Mutiny that was a precursor to the Philippine Revolution. However, Hispanic-Philippines reached its zenith when the Philippine-born Marcelo Azcárraga Palmero became a hero as he restored the Bourbon dynasty of Spain to the throne during his stint as Lieutenant-General (Three Star General) after the Bourbons have been deposed by revolutionaries. He eventually became Prime Minister of the Spanish Empire and was awarded membership in the Order of the Golden Fleece, which is considered the most exclusive and prestigious order of chivalry in the world. In the aftermath of Chilean soldiers' participation in the Andres Novales uprising against Spain, the Irish-Chilean founder of Chile, Bernardo O'Higgins, caught wind of anti-Spanish sentiment among Filipinos and planned to send a fleet to liberate the Philippines from Spain, under the command of Scottish-Chilean admiral, Lord Thomas Cochrane. The fleet would have been sent to the Philippines had it not been for Bernardo O'Higgins' untimely exile.

=== Philippine Revolution ===
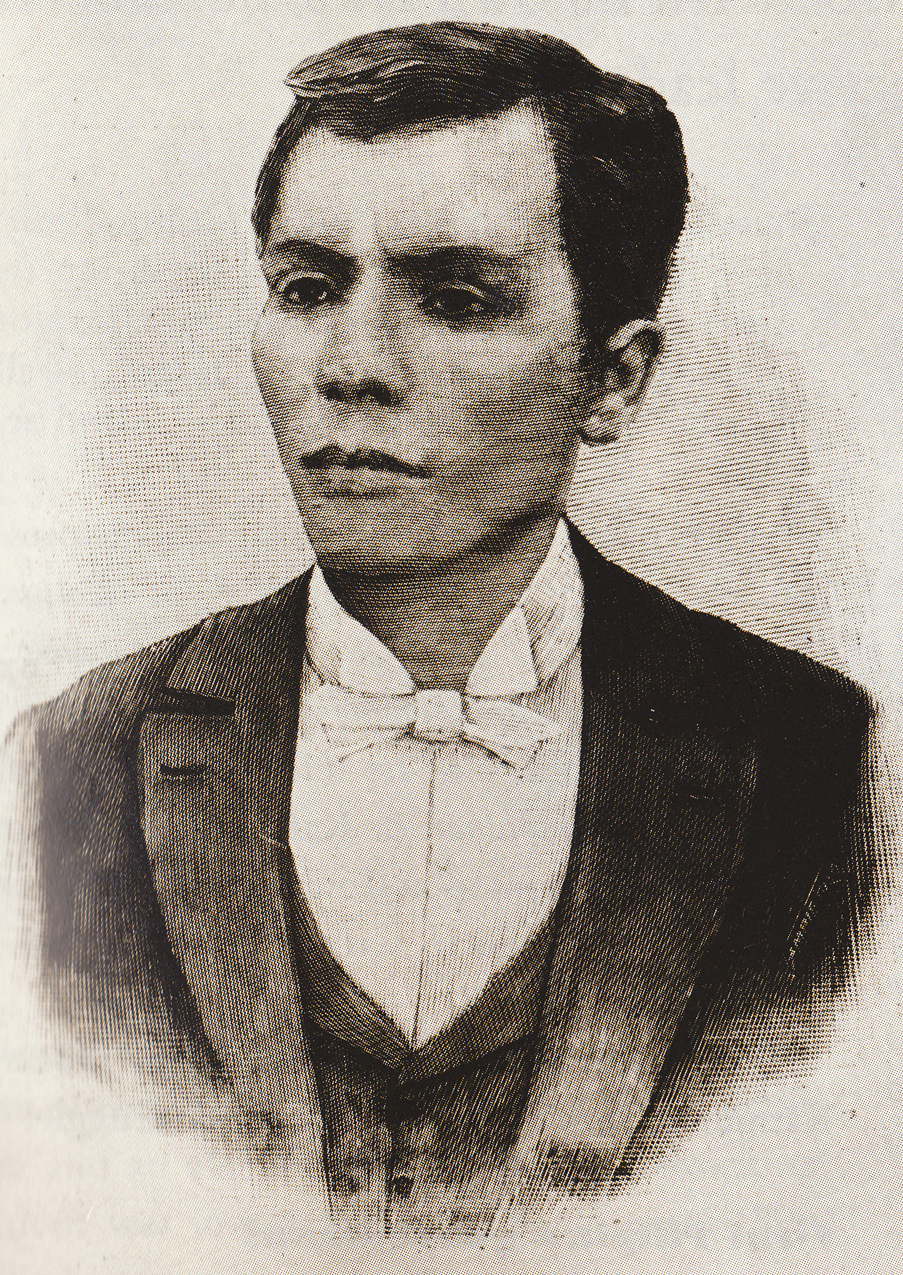
Andrés Bonifacio, father of the Philippine Revolution.

Revolutionary sentiments arose in 1872 after three Filipino priests, Mariano Gomez, José Burgos, and Jacinto Zamora, known as Gomburza, were accused of sedition by colonial authorities and executed by garotte. This would inspire the Propaganda Movement in Spain, organized by Marcelo H. del Pilar, José Rizal, Graciano López Jaena, and Mariano Ponce, that clamored for adequate representation to the Spanish Cortes and later for independence. José Rizal, the most celebrated intellectual and radical ilustrado of the era, wrote the novels "Noli Me Tángere" and "El filibusterismo", which greatly inspired the movement for independence. The Katipunan, a secret society whose primary purpose was that of overthrowing Spanish rule in the Philippines, was founded by Andrés Bonifacio who became its Supremo (leader).

In the 1860s to 1890s, in the urban areas of the Philippines, especially at Manila, according to burial statistics, as much as 3.3% of the population were pure European Spaniards and the pure Chinese were as high as 9.9%. The Spanish-Filipino and Chinese-Filipino Mestizo populations also fluctuated. Eventually, everybody belonging to these non-native categories diminished because they were assimilated into and chose to self-identify as pure Filipinos since during the Philippine Revolution, the term "Filipino" included anybody born in the Philippines coming from any race. That would explain the abrupt drop of otherwise high Chinese, Spanish, and mestizo percentages across the country by the time of the first American census in 1903.

The Philippine Revolution began in 1896. Rizal was wrongly implicated in the outbreak of the revolution and executed for treason in 1896. The Katipunan in Cavite split into two groups, Magdiwang, led by Mariano Álvarez (a relative of Bonifacio's by marriage), and Magdalo, led by Baldomero Aguinaldo cousin of Emilio Aguinaldo. Tension between the factions led to the Tejeros Convention in 1897, at which an election chose Emilio Aguinaldo as president over Bonifacio and Trias. Subsequent leadership conflicts with Bonifacio culminated in his execution by Aguinaldo's soldiers. Aguinaldo agreed to a truce with the Pact of Biak-na-Bato and Aguinaldo and his fellow revolutionaries were exiled to Hong Kong. Not all the revolutionary generals complied with the agreement. One, General Francisco Macabulos, established a Central Executive Committee to serve as the interim government until a more suitable one was created. Armed conflicts resumed, this time coming from almost every province in Spanish-governed Philippines.

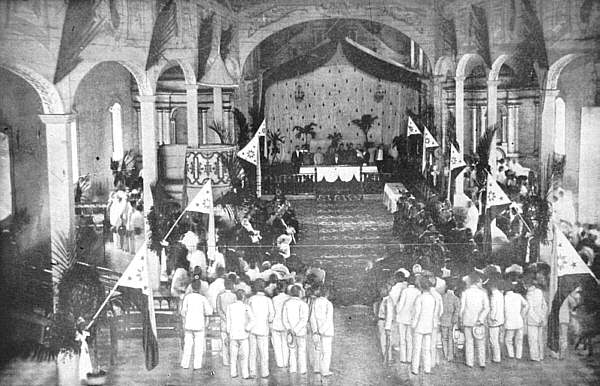
Revolutionaries gather during the Malolos Congress of the Revolutionary Government of the Philippines.

In 1898, as conflicts continued in the Philippines, the USS Maine, having been sent to Cuba because of U.S. concerns for the safety of its citizens during an ongoing Cuban revolution, exploded and sank in Havana harbor. This event precipitated the Spanish–American War. After Commodore George Dewey defeated the Spanish squadron at Manila, a German squadron arrived in Manila and engaged in maneuvers which Dewey, seeing this as obstruction of his blockade, offered war—after which the Germans backed down. The German Emperor expected an American defeat, with Spain left in a sufficiently weak position for the revolutionaries to capture Manila—leaving the Philippines ripe for German picking.

The U.S. invited Aguinaldo to return to the Philippines in the hope he would rally Filipinos against the Spanish colonial government. Aguinaldo arrived on May 19, 1898, via transport provided by Dewey. On June 12, 1898, Aguinaldo declared the independence of the Philippines in Kawit, Cavite. Aguinaldo proclaimed a Revolutionary Government of the Philippines on June 23. By the time U.S. land forces arrived, the Filipinos had taken control of the entire island of Luzon except for the Spanish capitol in the walled city of Intramuros. In the Battle of Manila, on August 13, 1898, the United States captured the city from the Spanish. This battle marked an end of Filipino-American collaboration, as Filipino forces were prevented from entering the captured city of Manila, an action deeply resented by the Filipinos.

== The First Philippine Republic (1899–1901) ==
Emilio Aguinaldo, President of the First Philippine Republic

On January 23, 1899, the First Philippine Republic was proclaimed under Asia's first democratic constitution, with Aguinaldo as its president. Under Aguinaldo, The Philippine Revolutionary Army was also renowned to be racially tolerant and progressive as it had a multi-ethnic composition that included various other races and nationalities asides from the native Filipino, being its officers. Juan Cailles an Indian and French Mestizo served as a Major General, the Chinese Filipino José Ignacio Paua was a Brigadier General, and Vicente Catalan who was appointed supreme Admiral of the Philippine Revolutionary Navy was a Cuban of Criollo descent. There were even Japanese, French and Italian soldiers in the Revolution and Republic, such as the Japanese officer Captain Chizuno Iwamoto, French soldier Estaquio Castellor, and Italian revolutionary Captain Camillo Ricchiardi. And, even among the defeated Spanish Army and American invaders, there are those who defected to the side of the Philippine Republic. The most famous of which was African-American Captain David Fagen who joined the Filipinos due to his disgust of American racism against both African-Americans and Filipinos. Various nations, mostly Latin American, also influenced the new Republic, the Sun in the Philippine flag was taken from the Sun of May of Peru, Argentina, and Uruguay which symbolized Inti who was the Incan Sun God, while the stars in the flag were inspired by the stars in the flags of the nations of Texas, Cuba, and Puerto Rico. The Constitution of the First Philippine Republic was also influenced by the Constitutions of Cuba, Belgium, Mexico, Brazil, Nicaragua, Costa Rica, and Guatemala, in addition to using the French Constitution of 1793.

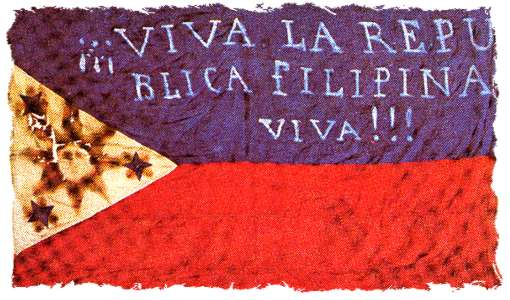
An early flag of the Filipino revolutionaries.

Despite the establishment of the First Philippine Republic, Spain and the United States had sent commissioners to Paris to draw up the terms of the Treaty of Paris to end the Spanish–American War. The Filipino representative, Felipe Agoncillo, had been excluded from sessions as Aguinaldo's government was not recognized by the family of nations. Although there was substantial domestic opposition, the United States decided to annex the Philippines. Despite the fact that the first Philippine Republic was patterned after the French and American Revolutions, plus the Latin-American Republics; the Americans and French themselves sought to crush the revolution in the Philippines. In addition to Guam and Puerto Rico, Spain was forced in the negotiations to cede the Philippines to the U.S. in exchange for US$20,000,000.00. U.S. President McKinley justified the annexation of the Philippines by saying that it was "a gift from the gods" and that since "they were unfit for self-government, ... there was nothing left for us to do but to take them all, and to educate the Filipinos, and uplift and civilize and Christianize them", even though the Philippines had already been Christianized by the Spanish over the course of several centuries. The First Philippine Republic resisted the U.S. occupation, resulting in the Philippine–American War (1899–1913).

== American rule (1898–1946) ==
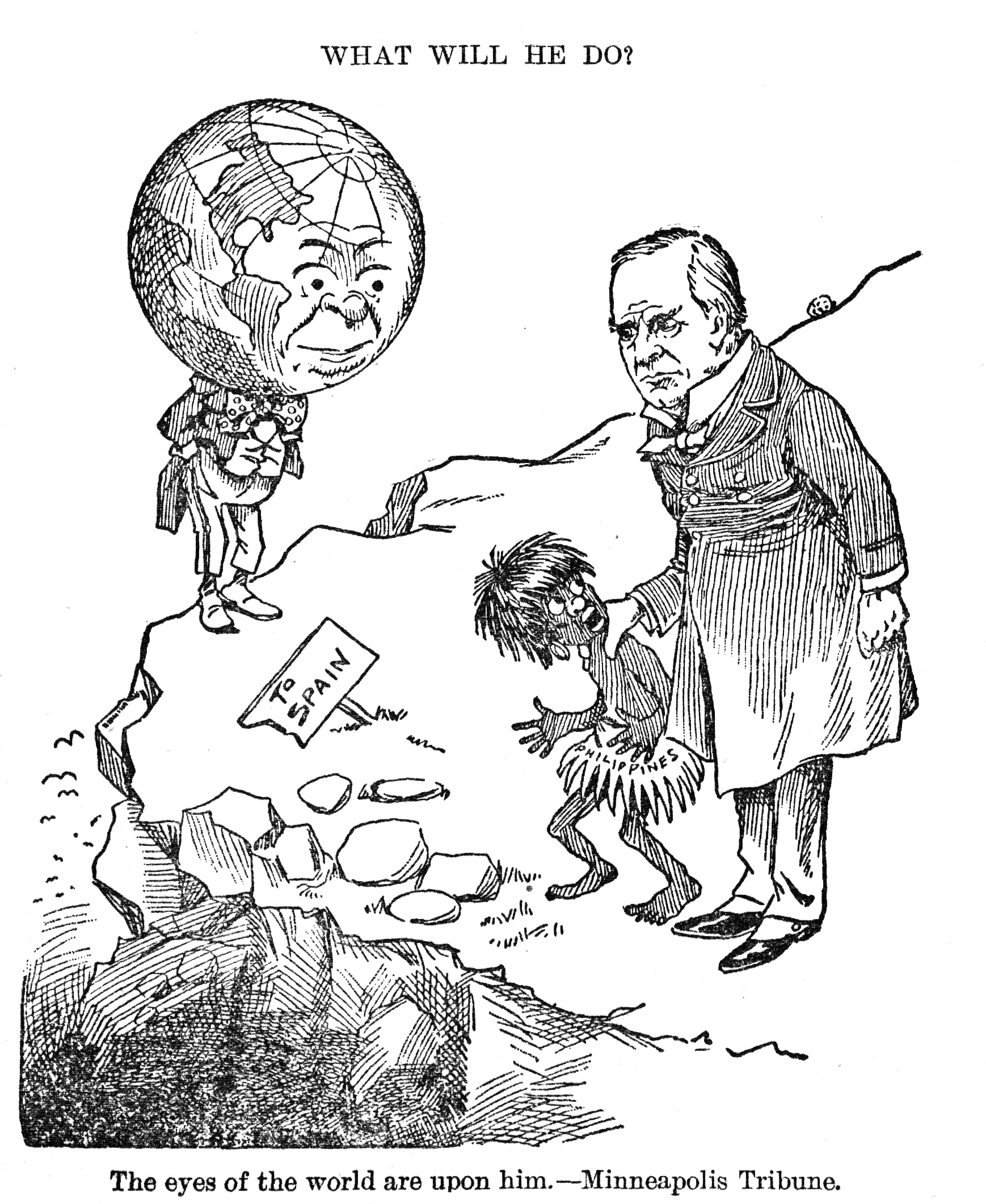
1898 political cartoon showing U.S. President McKinley with a native child. Here, returning the Philippines to Spain is compared to throwing the child off a cliff.

Filipinos initially saw their relationship with the United States as that of two nations joined in a common struggle against Spain. However, the United States later distanced itself from the interests of the Filipino insurgents. Emilio Aguinaldo was unhappy that the United States would not commit to paper a statement of support for Philippine independence. The islands were ceded by Spain to the United States alongside Puerto Rico and Guam as a result of the latter's victory in the Spanish–American War. A compensation of US$20 million was paid to Spain according to the terms of the 1898 Treaty of Paris. Relations deteriorated and tensions heightened as it became clear that the Americans were in the islands to stay.

=== Philippine–American War ===
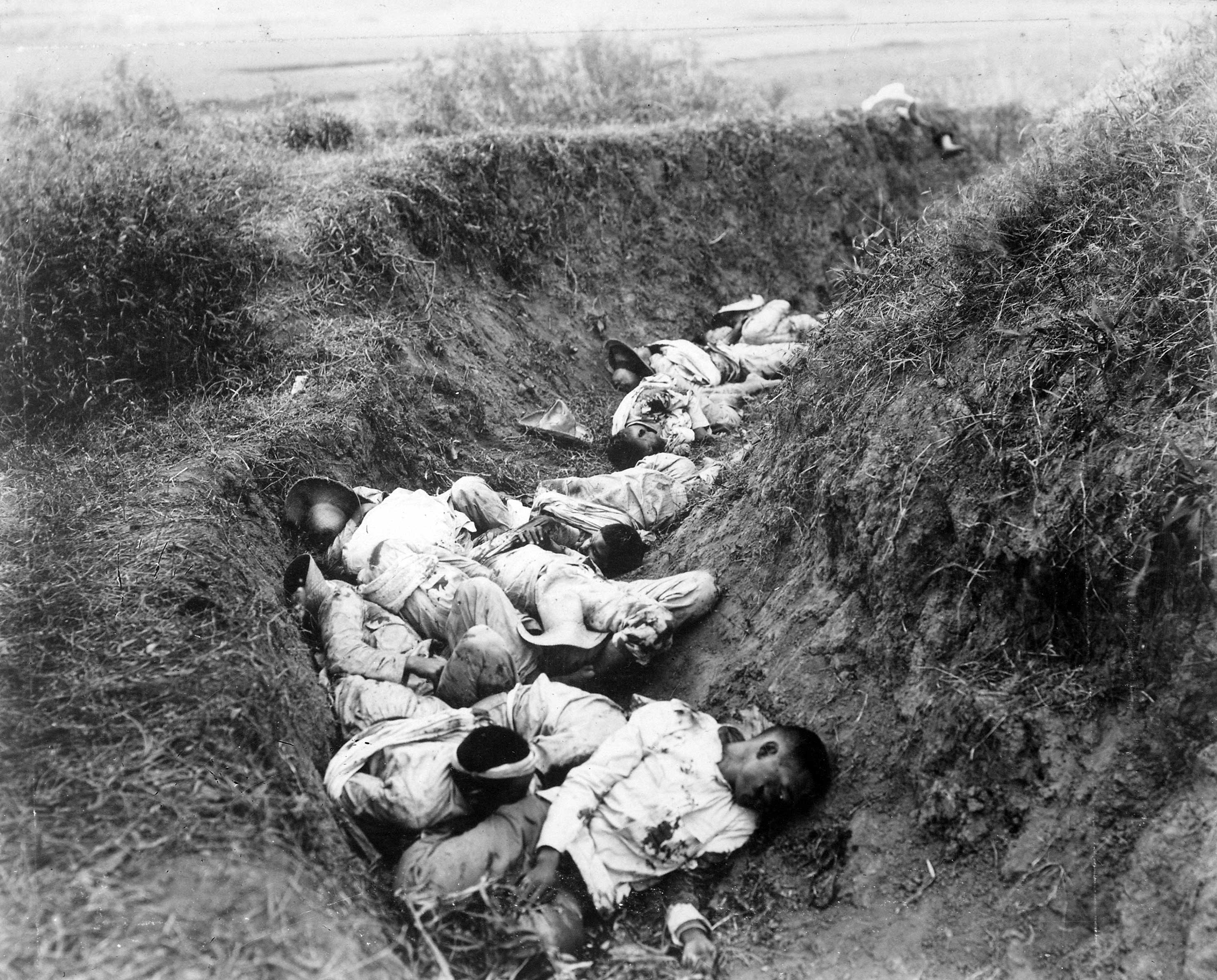
Filipino casualties on the first day of war

Hostilities broke out on February 4, 1899, after two American privates killed three Filipino soldiers as American forces launched a major attack in San Juan, a Manila suburb. This began the Philippine–American War, which cost far more money and took far more lives than the Spanish–American War. Some 126,000 American soldiers would be committed to the conflict; 4,234 Americans died, as did 12,000–20,000 Philippine Republican Army soldiers who were part of a nationwide guerrilla movement of at least 80,000 to 100,000 soldiers.

The general population, caught between Americans and rebels, suffered significantly. At least 200,000 Filipino civilians died as an indirect result of the war mostly as a result of the cholera epidemic at the war's end that took between 150,000 and 200,000 lives. Atrocities were committed by both sides.

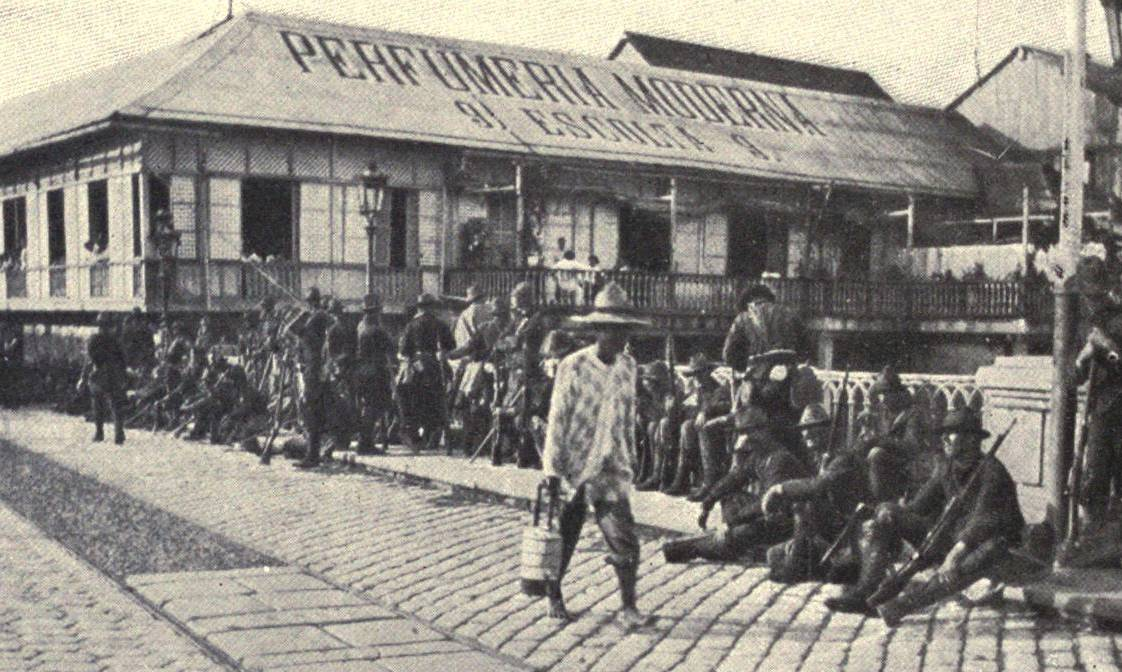
American troops guarding the bridge over the River Pasig on the afternoon of the surrender. From Harper's Pictorial History of the War with Spain, Vol. II, published by Harper and Brothers in 1899.

The poorly equipped Filipino troops were easily overpowered by American troops in open combat, but they were formidable opponents in guerrilla warfare. Malolos, the revolutionary capital, was captured on March 31, 1899. Aguinaldo and his government escaped, however, establishing a new capital at San Isidro, Nueva Ecija. On June 5, 1899, Antonio Luna, Aguinaldo's most capable military commander, was killed by Aguinaldo's guards in an apparent assassination while visiting Cabanatuan, Nueva Ecija to meet with Aguinaldo. With his best commander dead and his troops suffering continued defeats as American forces pushed into northern Luzon, Aguinaldo dissolved the regular army on November 13 and ordered the establishment of decentralized guerrilla commands in each of several military zones. Another key general, Gregorio del Pilar, was killed on December 2, 1899, in the Battle of Tirad Pass—a rear guard action to delay the Americans while Aguinaldo made good his escape through the mountains.

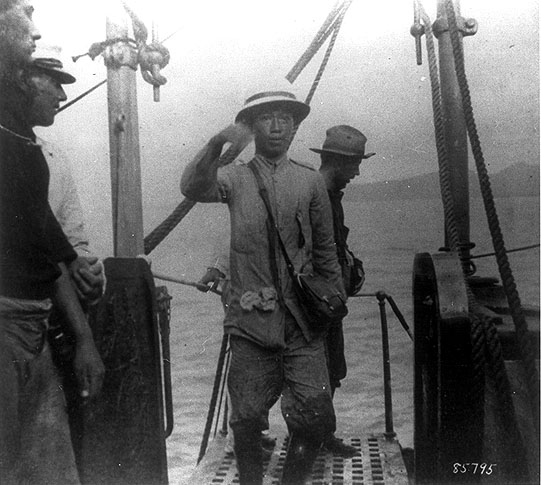
President Emilio Aguinaldo boarding the USS Vicksburg after his capture by American forces.

Aguinaldo was captured at Palanan, Isabela on March 23, 1901, and was brought to Manila. Convinced of the futility of further resistance, he swore allegiance to the United States and issued a proclamation calling on his compatriots to lay down their arms, officially bringing an end to the war. However, sporadic insurgent resistance continued in various parts of the Philippines, especially in the Muslim south, until 1913.

In 1900, President Roosevelt sent William Howard Taft as head of what would come to be known as the Taft Commission to the Philippines with a mandate to legislate laws and re-engineer the political system. Roosevelt also sent his daughter, Alice under Taft's watchful eye to visit the islands On July 1, 1901, Taft, the head of the commission, was inaugurated the Civil Governor, with limited executive powers. The authority of the Military Governor was continued in those areas where the insurrection persisted. The Taft Commission passed laws to set up the fundamentals of the new government, including a judicial system, civil service, and local government. A Philippine Constabulary was organized to deal with the remnants of the insurgent movement and gradually assume the responsibilities of the United States Army.

=== The Tagalog, Negros, and Zamboanga Republics ===
Brigadier General James F. Smith arrived at Bacolod on March 4, 1899, as the Military Governor of the Sub-district of Negros, after receiving an invitation from Aniceto Lacson, president of the breakaway Cantonal Republic of Negros. The Negros Republic became a Pro-American protectorate of the United States. Another insurgent republic was briefly formed during American administration: the Tagalog Republic in Luzon, under Macario Sakay. In the island of Mindanao the Chavacano-speaking Republic of Zamboanga was proclaimed. That government was formed by Vicente Álvarez with the support of Jamalul Kiram II, the then Sultan of Sulu, and included Latin-American (Peruvian, Uruguayan and Argentinian) enslaved soldiers who had revolted against the Spanish colonial government and included Muslims, Lumads, and Christians in his anti-Spanish army.

=== Insular Government (1901–1935) ===
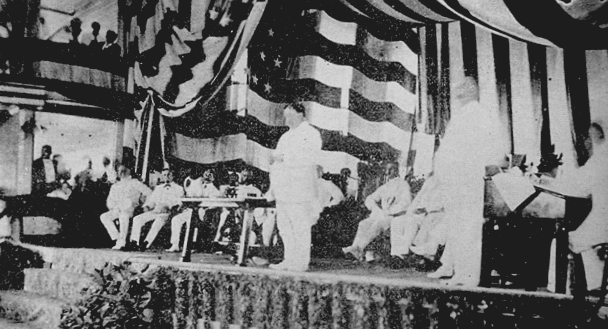
William Howard Taft addressing the audience at the Philippine Assembly.

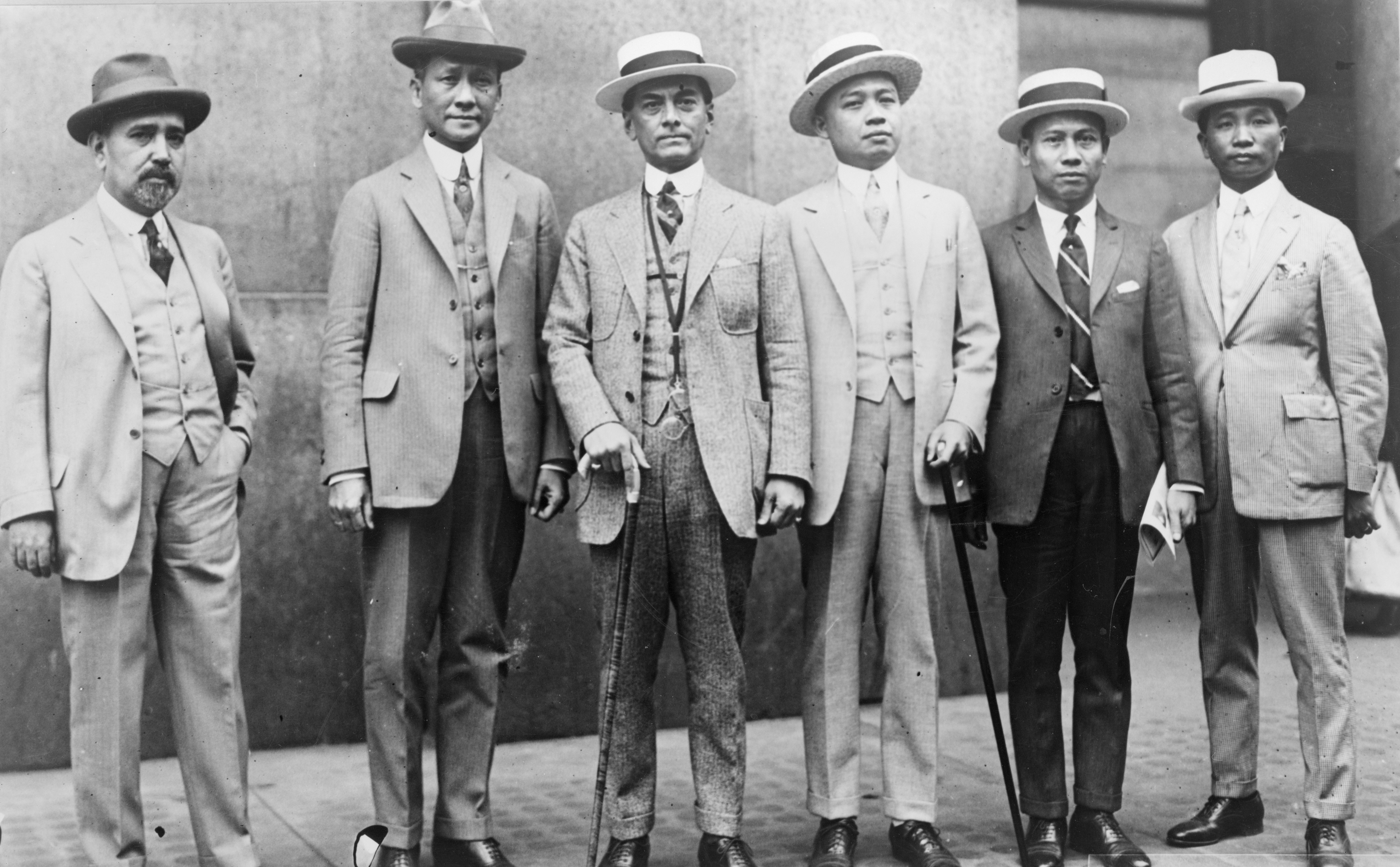
Representatives from the Philippine Independence Mission left to right: Isauro Gabaldón, Sergio Osmeña, Manuel L. Quezon, Claro M. Recto, Pedro Guevara, Jorge Bocobo

The Philippine Organic Act was the basic law for the Insular Government, so called because civil administration was under the authority of the U.S. Bureau of Insular Affairs. This government saw its mission as one of tutelage, preparing the Philippines for eventual independence. On July 4, 1902, the office of military governor was abolished and full executive power passed from Adna Chaffee, the last military governor, to Taft, who became the first U.S. Governor-General of the Philippines. United States policies towards the Philippines shifted with changing administrations. During the early years of territorial administration, the Americans were reluctant to delegate authority to the Filipinos, but an elected Philippine Assembly was inaugurated in 1907, as the lower house of a bicameral legislature, with the appointive Philippine Commission becoming the upper house.

Philippines was a major target for the progressive reformers. A 1907 report to Secretary of War Taft provided a summary of what the American civil administration had achieved. It included, in addition to the rapid building of a public school system based on English teaching, and boasted about such modernizing achievements as:

steel and concrete wharves at the newly renovated Port of Manila; dredging the River Pasig; streamlining of the Insular Government; accurate, intelligible accounting; the construction of a telegraph and cable communications network; the establishment of a postal savings bank; large-scale road-and bridge-building; impartial and incorrupt policing; well-financed civil engineering; the conservation of old Spanish architecture; large public parks; a bidding process for the right to build railways; Corporation law; and a coastal and geological survey.

In 1903 the American reformers in the Philippines passed two major land acts designed to turn landless peasants into owners of their farms. By 1905 the law was clearly a failure. Reformers such as Taft believed landownership would turn unruly agrarians into loyal subjects. The social structure in the rural Philippines was highly traditional and highly unequal. Drastic changes in landownership posed a major challenge to local elites, who would not accept it, nor would their peasant clients. The American reformers blamed peasant resistance to landownership for the law's failure and argued that large plantations and sharecropping was the Philippines' best path to development.

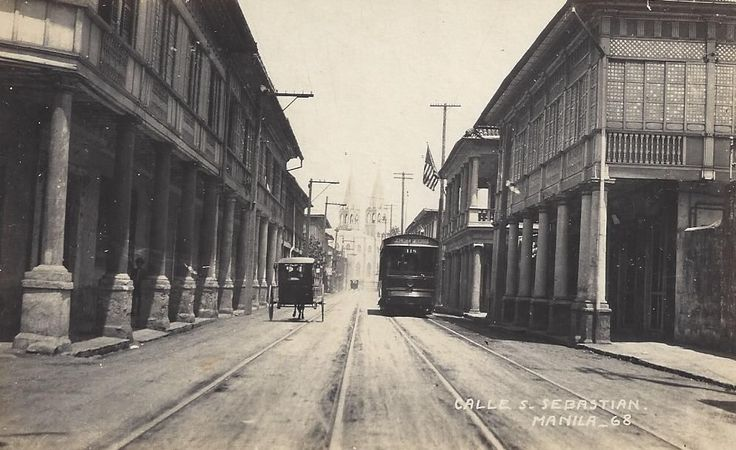
A tranvía in Manila during the American colonial period.

Elite Filipina women played a major role in the reform movement, especially on health issues. They specialized on such urgent needs as infant care and maternal and child health, the distribution of pure milk and teaching new mothers about children's health. The most prominent organizations were the La Protección de la Infancia, and the National Federation of Women's Clubs.

When Democrat Woodrow Wilson became U.S. president in 1913, new policies were launched designed to gradually lead to Philippine independence. In 1902 U.S. law established Filipinos citizenship in the Philippine Islands; unlike Hawaii in 1898 and Puerto Rico in 1918, they did not become citizens of the United States. The Jones Law of 1916 became the new basic law, promising eventual independence. It provided for the election of both houses of the legislature.

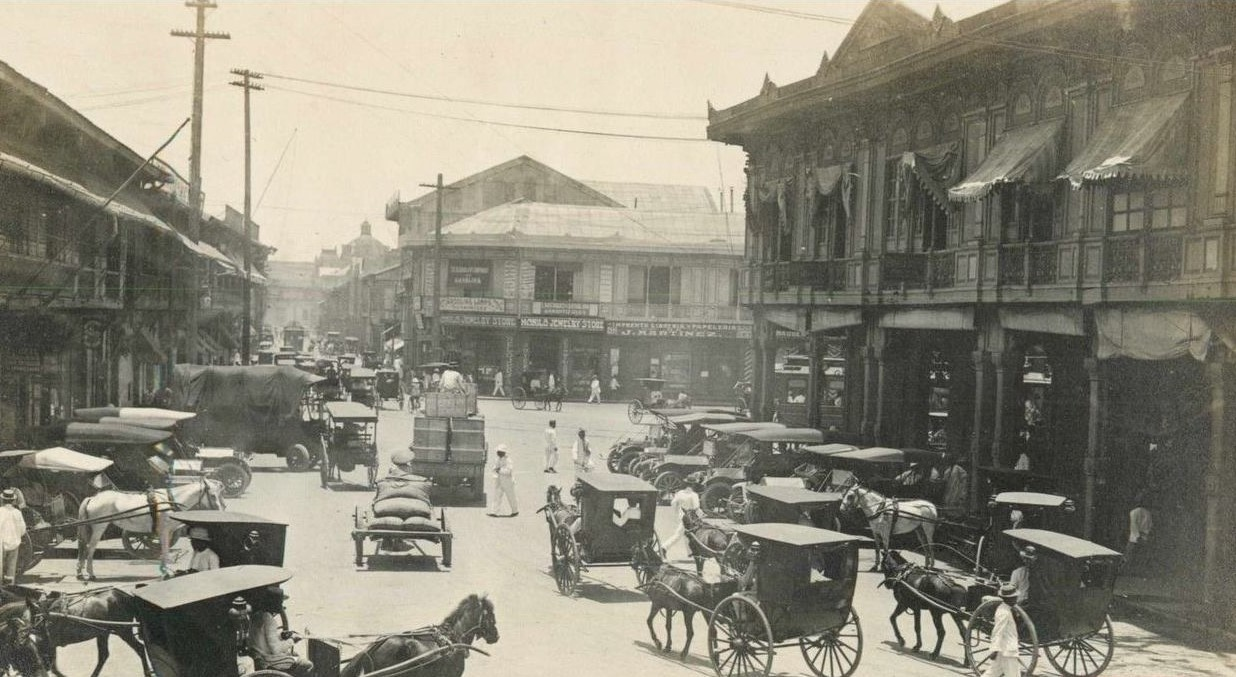
Manila, Philippines, c. 1900s

In socio-economic terms, the Philippines made solid progress in this period. Foreign trade had amounted to 62 million pesos in 1895, 13% of which was with the United States. By 1920, it had increased to 601 million pesos, 66% of which was with the United States. A health care system was established which, by 1930, reduced the mortality rate from all causes, including various tropical diseases, to a level similar to that of the United States itself. The practices of slavery, piracy and headhunting were suppressed but not entirely extinguished. A new educational system was established with English as the medium of instruction, eventually becoming a lingua franca of the Islands. The 1920s saw alternating periods of cooperation and confrontation with American governors-general, depending on how intent the incumbent was on exercising his powers vis-à-vis the Philippine legislature. Members of the elected legislature lobbied for immediate and complete independence from the United States. Several independence missions were sent to Washington, D.C. A civil service was formed and was gradually taken over by Filipinos, who had effectively gained control by 1918.

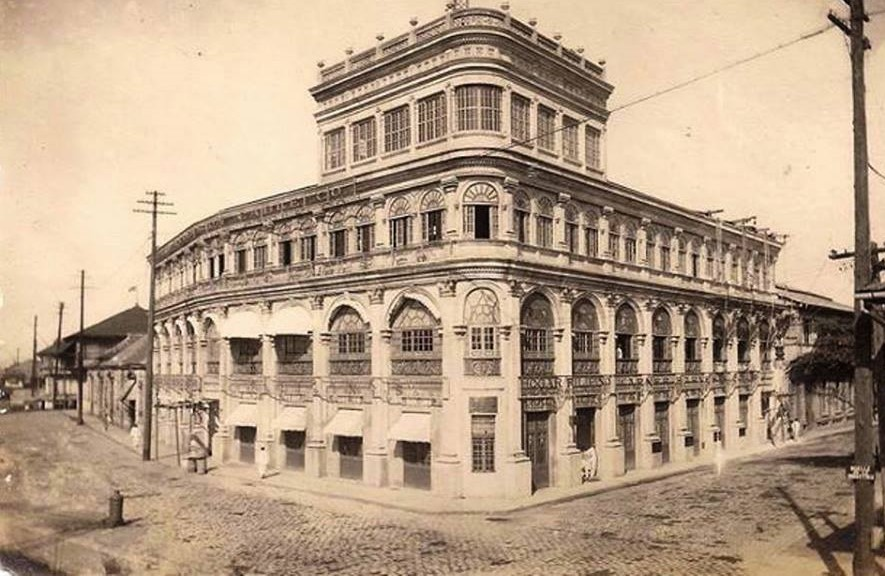
El Hogar Building. With Manila's Hispanic-Austronesian-Sinic roots, Daniel Burnham built a plan that takes advantage of its cityscape, possessing the Bay of Naples, the winding river of Paris, and the canals of Venice. With his City Beautiful movement style of Urban planning.

Philippine politics during the American territorial era was dominated by the Nacionalista Party, which was founded in 1907. Although the party's platform called for "immediate independence", their policy toward the Americans was highly accommodating. Within the political establishment, the call for independence was spearheaded by Manuel L. Quezon, who served continuously as Senate president from 1916 until 1935.

World War I gave the Philippines the opportunity to pledge assistance to the US war effort. This took the form of an offer to supply a division of troops, as well as providing funding for the construction of two warships. A locally recruited national guard was created and significant numbers of Filipinos volunteered for service in the US Navy and army.

Daniel Burnham built an architectural plan for Manila which would have transformed it into a modern city.

Frank Murphy was the last Governor-General of the Philippines (1933–35), and the first U.S. High Commissioner of the Philippines (1935–36). The change in form was more than symbolic: it was intended as a manifestation of the transition to independence.

=== Commonwealth ===
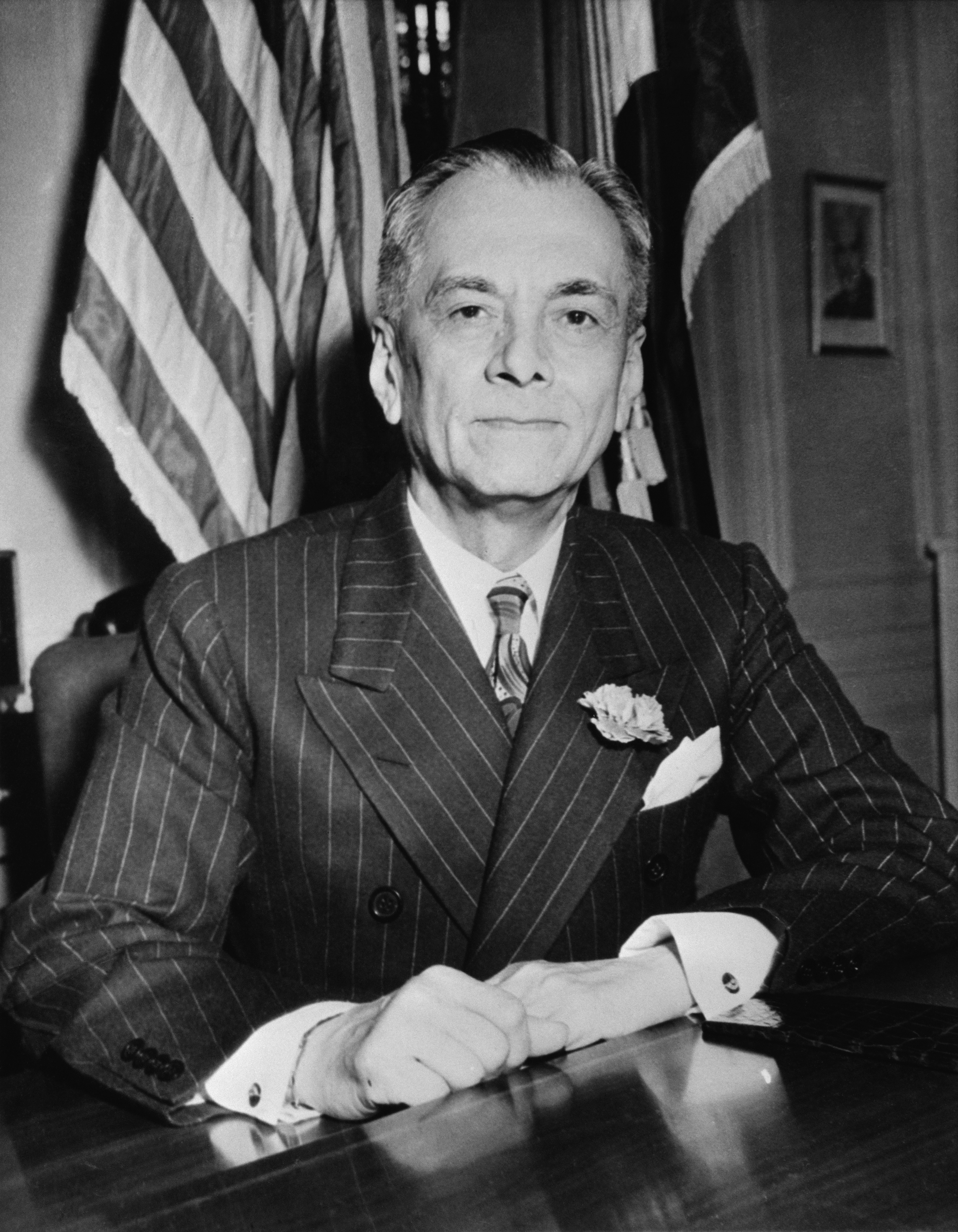
Philippine President Manuel L. Quezon

The Great Depression in the early thirties hastened the progress of the Philippines towards independence. In the United States it was mainly the sugar industry and labor unions that had a stake in loosening the U.S. ties to the Philippines since they could not compete with the Philippine cheap sugar (and other commodities) which could freely enter the U.S. market. Therefore, they agitated in favor of granting independence to the Philippines so that its cheap products and labor could be shut out of the United States.

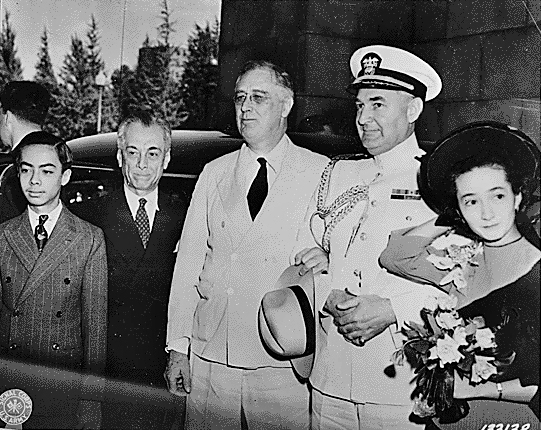
Commonwealth President Manuel L. Quezon with United States President Franklin D. Roosevelt in Washington, D.C.

In 1933, the United States Congress passed the Hare–Hawes–Cutting Act as a Philippine Independence Act over President Herbert Hoover's veto. Though the bill had been drafted with the aid of a commission from the Philippines, it was opposed by Philippine Senate President Manuel L. Quezon, partially because of provisions leaving the United States in control of naval bases. Under his influence, the Philippine legislature rejected the bill. The following year, a revised act known as the Tydings–McDuffie Act was finally passed. The act provided for the establishment of the Commonwealth of the Philippines with transition to full independence after a ten-year period. The commonwealth would have its own constitution and be self-governing, though foreign policy would be the responsibility of the United States, and certain legislation required approval of the United States president. The Act stipulated that the date of independence would be on July 4 following the tenth anniversary of the establishment of the Commonwealth.

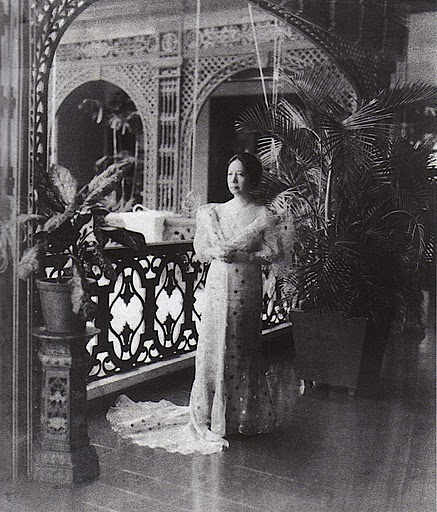
Philippine First Lady Aurora Quezon

A Constitutional Convention was convened in Manila on July 30, 1934. On February 8, 1935, the 1935 Constitution of the Republic of the Philippines was approved by the convention by a vote of 177 to 1. The constitution was approved by President Franklin D. Roosevelt on March 23, 1935, and ratified by popular vote on May 14, 1935.

On September 17, 1935, presidential elections were held. Candidates included former president Emilio Aguinaldo, the Iglesia Filipina Independiente leader Gregorio Aglipay, and others. Manuel L. Quezon and Sergio Osmeña of the Nacionalista Party were proclaimed the winners, winning the seats of president and vice-president, respectively.

The Commonwealth Government was inaugurated on the morning of November 15, 1935, in ceremonies held on the steps of the Legislative Building in Manila. The event was attended by a crowd of around 300,000 people. Under the Tydings–McDuffie Act this meant that the date of full independence for the Philippines was set for July 4, 1946, a timetable which was followed after the passage of almost eleven very eventful years.

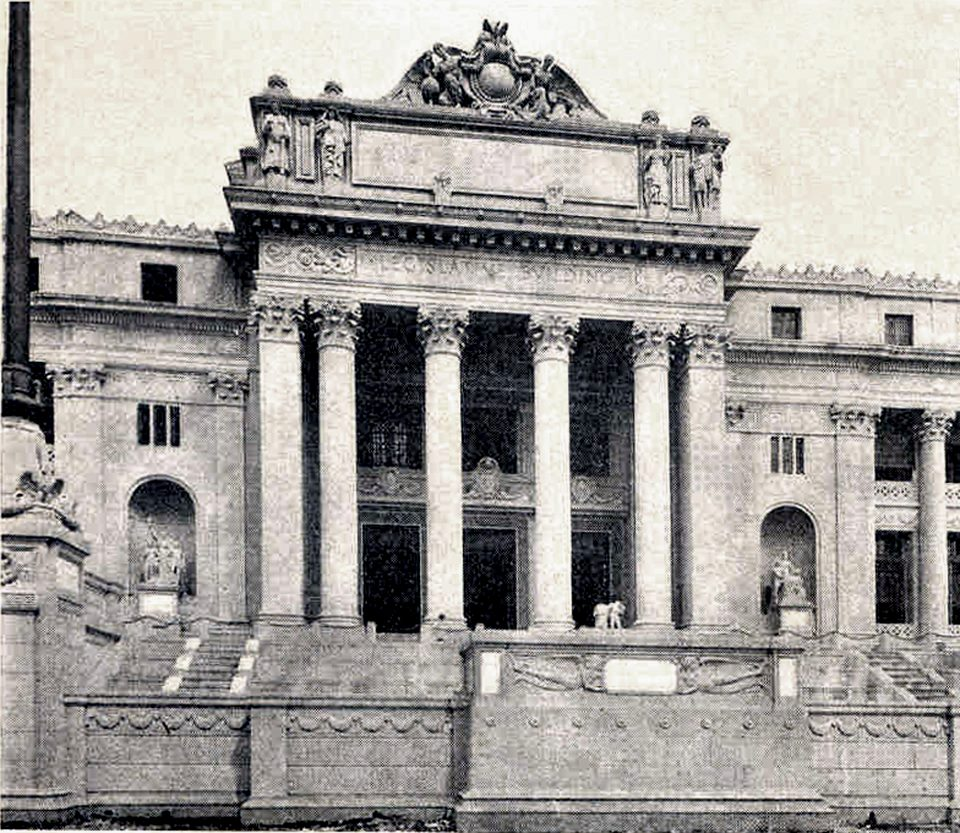
Legislative Building of the commonwealth of the Philippines

The new government embarked on ambitious nation-building policies in preparation for economic and political independence. These included national defense (such as the National Defense Act of 1935, which organized a conscription for service in the country), greater control over the economy, the perfection of democratic institutions, reforms in education, improvement of transport, the promotion of local capital, industrialization, and the colonization of Mindanao.

However, uncertainties, especially in the diplomatic and military situation in Southeast Asia, in the level of U.S. commitment to the future Republic of the Philippines, and in the economy due to the Great Depression, proved to be major problems. The situation was further complicated by the presence of agrarian unrest, and of power struggles between Osmeña and Quezon, especially after Quezon was permitted to be re-elected after one six-year term.

A proper evaluation of the policies' effectiveness or failure is difficult due to Japanese invasion and occupation during World War II.

=== World War II and Japanese occupation ===
==== Military ====
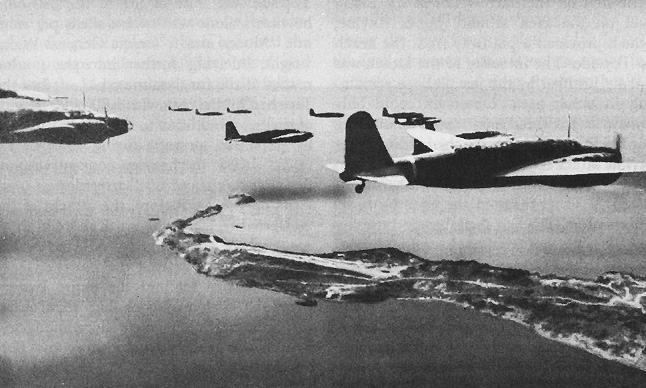
Japanese bombers over Corregidor

Japan launched a surprise attack on the Clark Air Base in Pampanga on the morning of December 8, 1941, just ten hours after the attack on Pearl Harbor. Aerial bombardment was followed by landings of ground troops on Luzon. The defending Philippine and United States troops were under the command of General Douglas MacArthur. Under the pressure of superior numbers, the defending forces withdrew to the Bataan Peninsula and to the island of Corregidor at the entrance to Manila Bay.

On January 2, 1942, General MacArthur declared the capital city, Manila, an open city to prevent its destruction. The Philippine defense continued until the final surrender of United States-Philippine forces on the Bataan Peninsula in April 1942 and on Corregidor in May of the same year. Most of the 80,000 prisoners of war captured by the Japanese at Bataan were forced to undertake the infamous Bataan Death March to a prison camp 105 kilometers to the north. About 10,000 Filipinos and 1,200 Americans died before reaching their destination. President Quezon and Osmeña had accompanied the troops to Corregidor and later left for the United States, where they set up a government in exile. MacArthur was ordered to Australia, where he started to plan for a return to the Philippines.

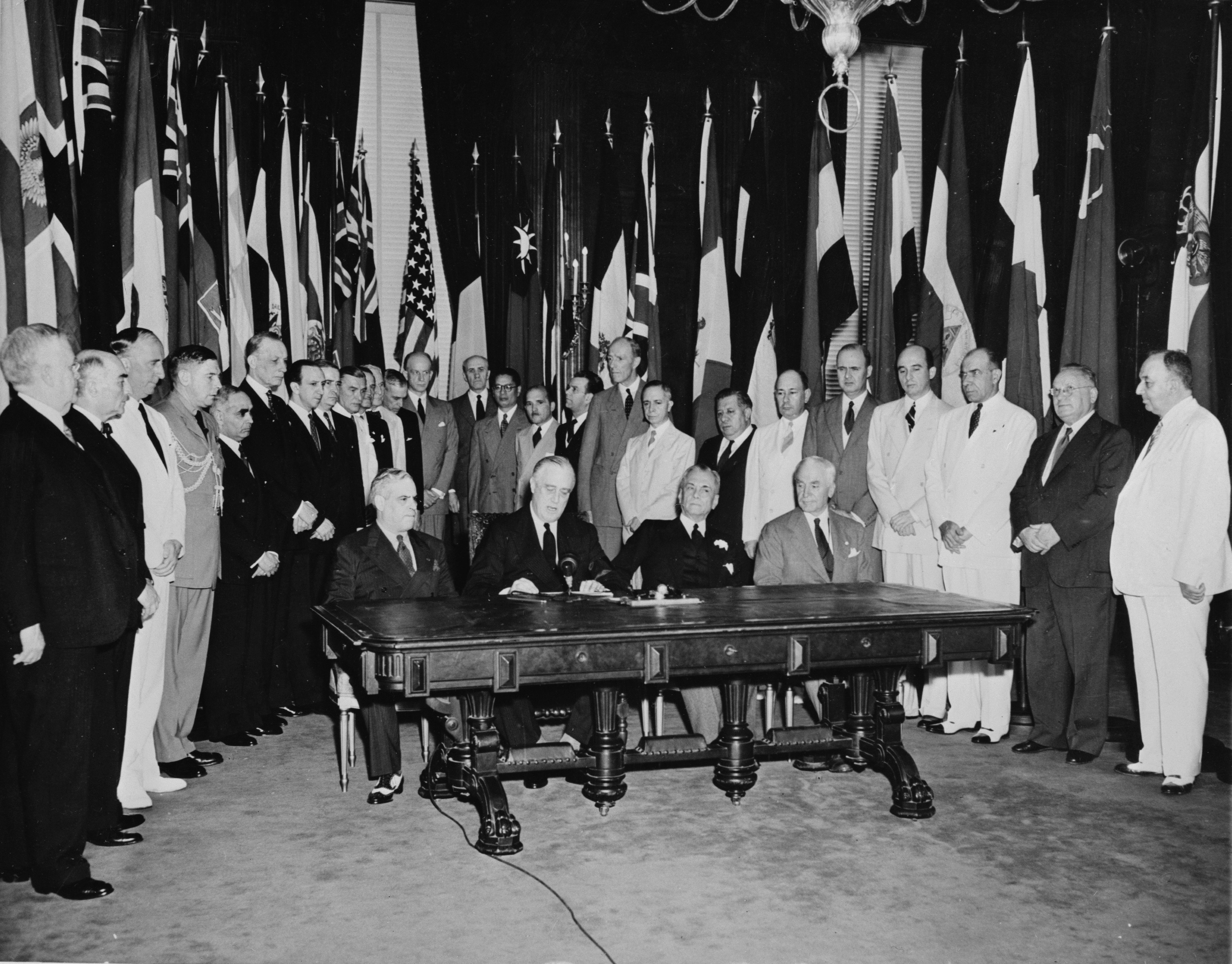
Exiled Manuel L. Quezon (sitting second to the right) in Washington, D.C., with Representatives of 26 United Nations at Flag day ceremonies in the White House to reaffirm their pact.

The Japanese military authorities immediately began organizing a new government structure in the Philippines and established the Philippine Executive Commission. They initially organized a Council of State, through which they directed civil affairs until October 1943, when Japan declared the Philippines an independent republic at Gozen Kaigi since U.S. government had promised independence of the Philippines in 1935. The Japanese-sponsored republic headed by President José P. Laurel proved to be unpopular.

From mid-1942 through mid-1944, Japanese occupation of the Philippines was opposed by large-scale underground and guerrilla activity. The Philippine Army, as well as remnants of the U.S. Army Forces Far East, continued to fight the Japanese in a guerrilla war and was considered an auxiliary unit of the United States Army. Supplies and encouragement were provided by U.S. Navy submarines and a few parachute drops. Their effectiveness was such that by the end of the war, Japan controlled only twelve of the forty-eight provinces. One element of resistance in the Central Luzon area was furnished by the Hukbalahap, which armed some 30,000 people and extended their control over much of Luzon. While remaining loyal to the United States, many Filipinos hoped and believed that liberation from the Japanese would bring them freedom and their already-promised independence.

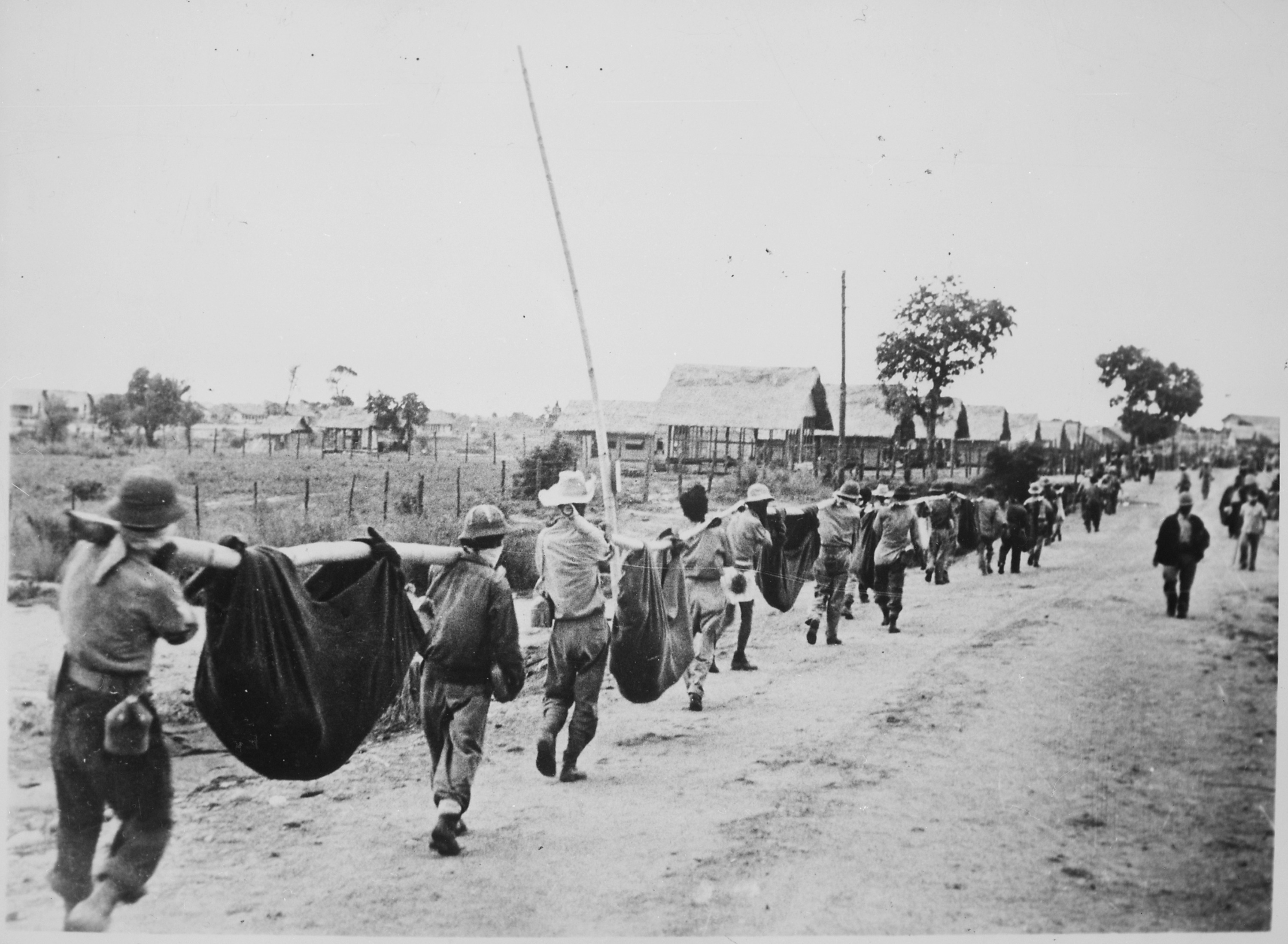
As many as 10,000 American and Filipino soldiers died in the Bataan Death March

The Philippines was the bloodiest theater of the war for the invading empire, with at least 498,600 Japanese troops killed in fighting the combined Filipino resistance and American soldiers, a larger number of casualties compared to the second-placed theater, the entirety of China, which caused the Japanese about 455,700 casualties. The occupation of the Philippines by Japan ended at the war's conclusion. At the eve of the liberation of the Philippines, the Allied forces and the Japanese Empire waged the largest naval battle in history, by gross tonnage in the Battle of Leyte Gulf. The American army had been fighting the Philippines Campaign since October 1944, when MacArthur's Sixth United States Army landed on Leyte. Landings in other parts of the country had followed, and the Allies, with the Philippine Commonwealth troops, pushed toward Manila. However, fighting continued until Japan's formal surrender on September 2, 1945. Approximately 10,000 U.S. soldiers were missing in action in the Philippines when the war ended, more than in any other country in the Pacific or European Theaters. The Philippines suffered great loss of life and tremendous physical destruction, especially during the Battle of Manila. An estimated 1 million Filipinos had been killed, a large portion during the final months of the war, and Manila had been extensively damaged.

==== Home front ====
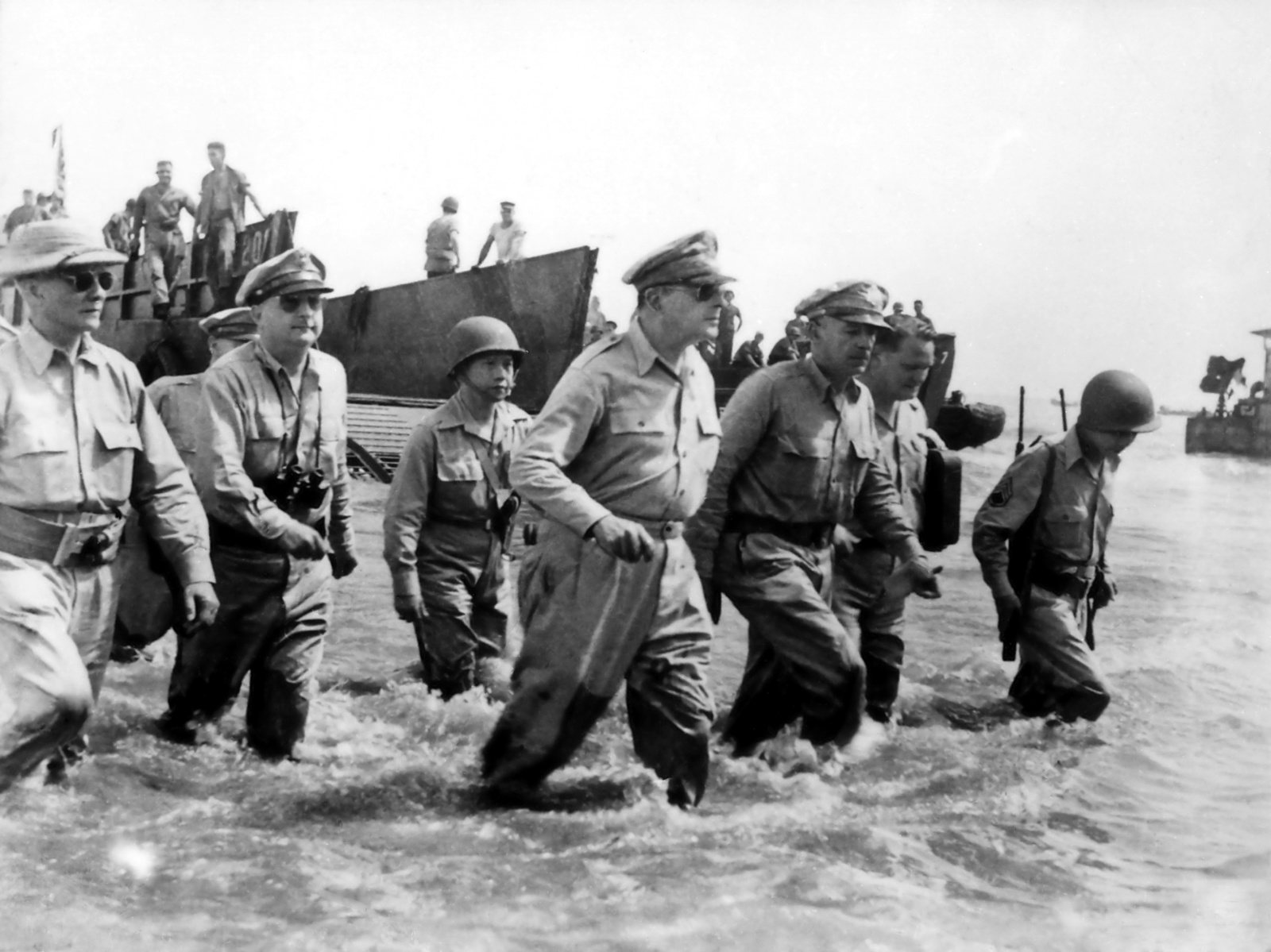
Leyte Landing of General Douglas MacArthur to liberate the Philippines from the Empire of Japan

As in most occupied countries, crime, looting, corruption, and black markets were endemic. Japan in 1943 proposed independence on new terms, and some collaborators went along with the plan, but Japan was clearly losing the war and nothing became of it.

With a view of building up the economic base of the Greater East Asia Co-Prosperity Sphere, the Japanese Army envisioned using the islands as a source of agricultural products needed by its industry. For example, the Japanese had a surplus of sugar from Taiwan but a severe shortage of cotton, so they tried to grow cotton on sugar lands with disastrous results. They lacked the seeds, pesticides, and technical skills to grow cotton. Jobless farm workers flocked to the cities, where there was minimal relief and few jobs. The Japanese Army also tried using cane sugar for fuel, castor beans and copra for oil, derris for quinine, cotton for uniforms, and abaca (hemp) for rope. The plans were very difficult to implement in the face of limited skills, collapsed international markets, bad weather, and transportation shortages. The program was a failure that gave very little help to Japanese industry, and diverted resources needed for food production.

Living conditions were bad throughout the Philippines during the war. Transportation between the islands was difficult because of lack of fuel. Food was in very short supply, due to inflation.

== The Third Republic (1946–1965) ==
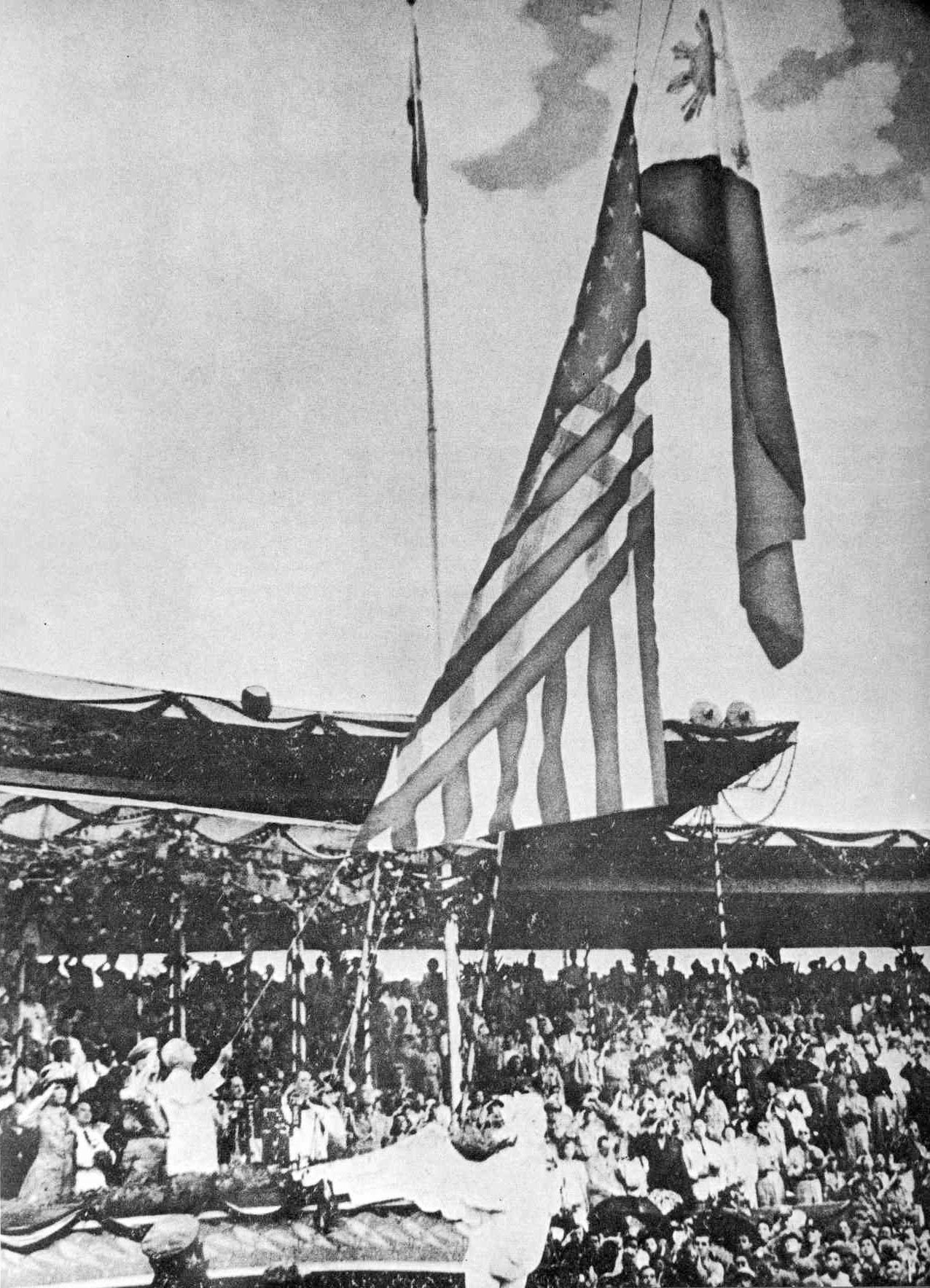
The Flag of the United States of America is lowered while the Flag of the Philippines is raised during the Independence Day ceremonies on July 4, 1946

The return of the Americans in spring 1945 was welcomed by nearly all the Filipinos, in sharp contrast to the situation in nearby Dutch East Indies. The collaborationist "Philippine Republic" set up by the Japanese under Jose P. Laurel, was highly unpopular, and the extreme destructiveness of the Japanese Army in Manila in its last days solidified Japan's image as a permanent target of hate. The pre-war Commonwealth system was reestablished under Sergio Osmeña, who became president in exile after President Quezon died in 1944. Osmeña was little-known and his Nacionalista Party was no longer such a dominant force. Osmeña supporters challenged the legitimacy of Manuel Roxas who had served as secretary to Laurel. MacArthur testified to Roxas' patriotism and the collaborationist issue disappeared after Roxas was elected in 1946 on a platform calling for closer ties with the United States; adherence to the new United Nations; national reconstruction; relief for the masses; social justice for the working class; the maintenance of peace and order; the preservation of individual rights and liberties of the citizenry; and honesty and efficiency of government. The United States Congress passed a series of programs to help rehabilitation, including $2 billion over five years for war damages and rehabilitation, and a new tariff law that provided for a 20-year transition from free trade to a low tariff with the United States. Washington also demanded that Americans would have equal rights with Filipinos in business activities, a special treatment that was resented. In 1947 the United States secured an agreement that it would keep its major military and naval bases. On the whole the transition to independence, achieved in 1946, was mostly peaceful and highly successful, despite the extreme difficulties caused by massive war damages. The special relationship with the United States remained the dominant feature until sharp criticism arose in the 1960s.

=== Administration of Manuel Roxas (1946–1948) ===
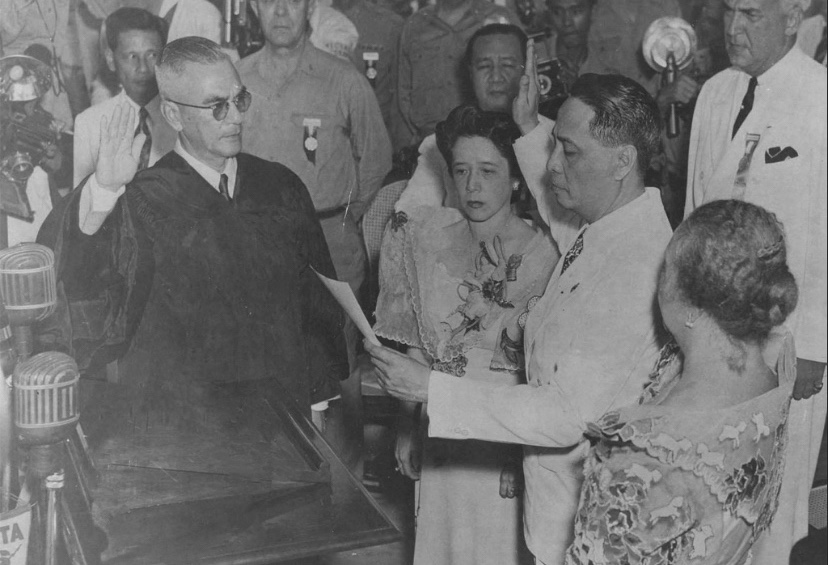
Manuel Roxas inaugurated as president in 1946

Elections were held in April 1946, with Manuel Roxas becoming the first president of the independent Republic of the Philippines. The United States ceded its sovereignty over the Philippines on July 4, 1946, as scheduled. Ending the 381 years of colonial rule in the country that had lasted from April 27, 1565, since the Spanish settlement. However, the Philippine economy remained highly dependent on United States markets—more dependent, according to United States high commissioner Paul McNutt, than any single U.S. state was dependent on the rest of the country. The Philippine Trade Act, passed as a precondition for receiving war rehabilitation grants from the United States, exacerbated the dependency with provisions further tying the economies of the two countries. A military assistance pact was signed in 1947 granting the United States a 99-year lease on designated military bases in the country.

During Roxas' term of office administration of the Turtle Islands and Mangsee Islands was transferred by the United Kingdom to the Republic of the Philippines. By an international treaty concluded in 1930 between the United States (in respect of its then overseas territory, the Philippine Archipelago) and the United Kingdom (in respect of its then protectorate, the State of North Borneo) the two powers agreed the international boundaries between those respective territories. In that treaty the United Kingdom also accepted that the Turtle Islands as well as the Mangsee Islands were part of the Philippines Archipelago and therefore under US sovereignty. However, by a supplemental international treaty concluded at the same time, the two powers agreed that those islands, although part of the Philippines Archipelago, would remain under the administration of the State of North Borneo's British North Borneo Company. The supplemental treaty provided that the British North Borneo Company would continue to administer those islands unless and until the United States government gave notice to the United Kingdom calling for administration of the islands to be transferred to the U.S. The U.S. never gave such a notice. On July 4, 1946, the Republic of the Philippines was born. It became the successor to the U.S. under the treaties of 1930. On July 15, 1946, the United Kingdom annexed the State of North Borneo and, in the view of the United Kingdom, became the sovereign power with respect to what had been the State of North Borneo. On September 19, 1946, the Republic of the Philippines notified the United Kingdom that it wished to take over the administration of the Turtle Islands, Tawi-Tawi and the Mangesse Islands. Pursuant to a supplemental international agreement, the transfer of administration became effective on October 16, 1947.

Roxas did not stay long in office, dying of a heart attack soon after a speech at Clark Air Base on April 15, 1948. He was succeeded by his vice president Elpidio Quirino.

=== Administration of Elpidio Quirino (1948–1953) ===
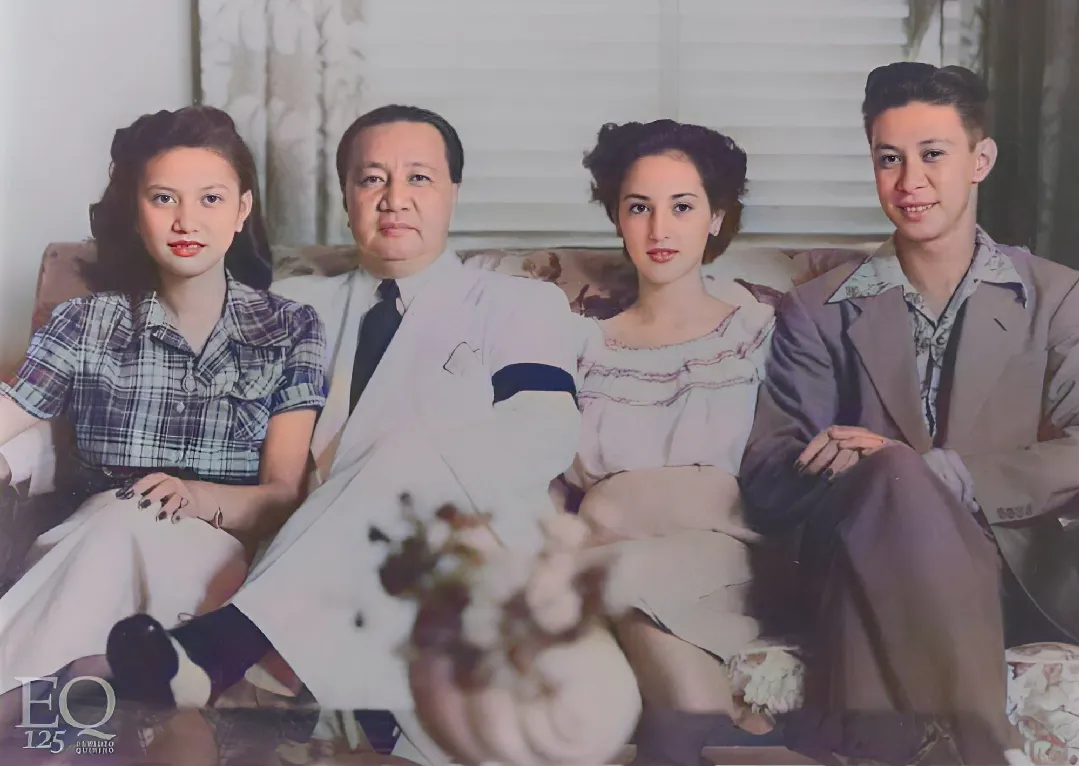
President Quirino (in the center-left) and family in Malacañang Palace.

The Roxas administration granted general amnesty to those who had collaborated with the Japanese in World War II, except for those who had committed violent crimes. Roxas died suddenly of a heart attack in April 1948, and the vice president, Elpidio Quirino, was elevated to the presidency. He ran for president in his own right in 1949, defeating José P. Laurel and winning a four-year term.

World War II had left the Philippines demoralized and severely damaged. The task of reconstruction was complicated by the activities of the Communist-supported Hukbalahap guerrillas (known as "Huks"), who had evolved into a violent resistance force against the new Philippine government. Government policy towards the Huks alternated between gestures of negotiation and harsh suppression. Secretary of Defense Ramon Magsaysay initiated a campaign to defeat the insurgents militarily and at the same time win popular support for the government. The Huk movement had waned in the early 1950s, finally ending with the unconditional surrender of Huk leader Luis Taruc in May 1954.

Enhancing President Manuel Roxas' policy of social justice to alleviate the lot of the common mass, President Quirino, almost immediately after assuming office, started a series of steps calculated to effectively ameliorate the economic condition of the people. After periodic surprise visits to the slums of Manila and other backward regions of the country, President Quirino officially made public a seven-point program for social security, to wit: unemployment insurance, old-age insurance, accident and permanent disability insurance, health insurance, maternity insurance, state relief, and labor opportunity.

President Quirino also created the Social Security Commission, making Social Welfare Commissioner Asuncion Perez chairman of the same. This was followed by the creation of the President's Action Committee on Social Amelioration, charged with extending aid, loans, and relief to the less fortunate citizens. Both the policy and its implementation were hailed by the people as harbingers of great benefits.

=== Administration of Ramon Magsaysay (1953–1957) ===
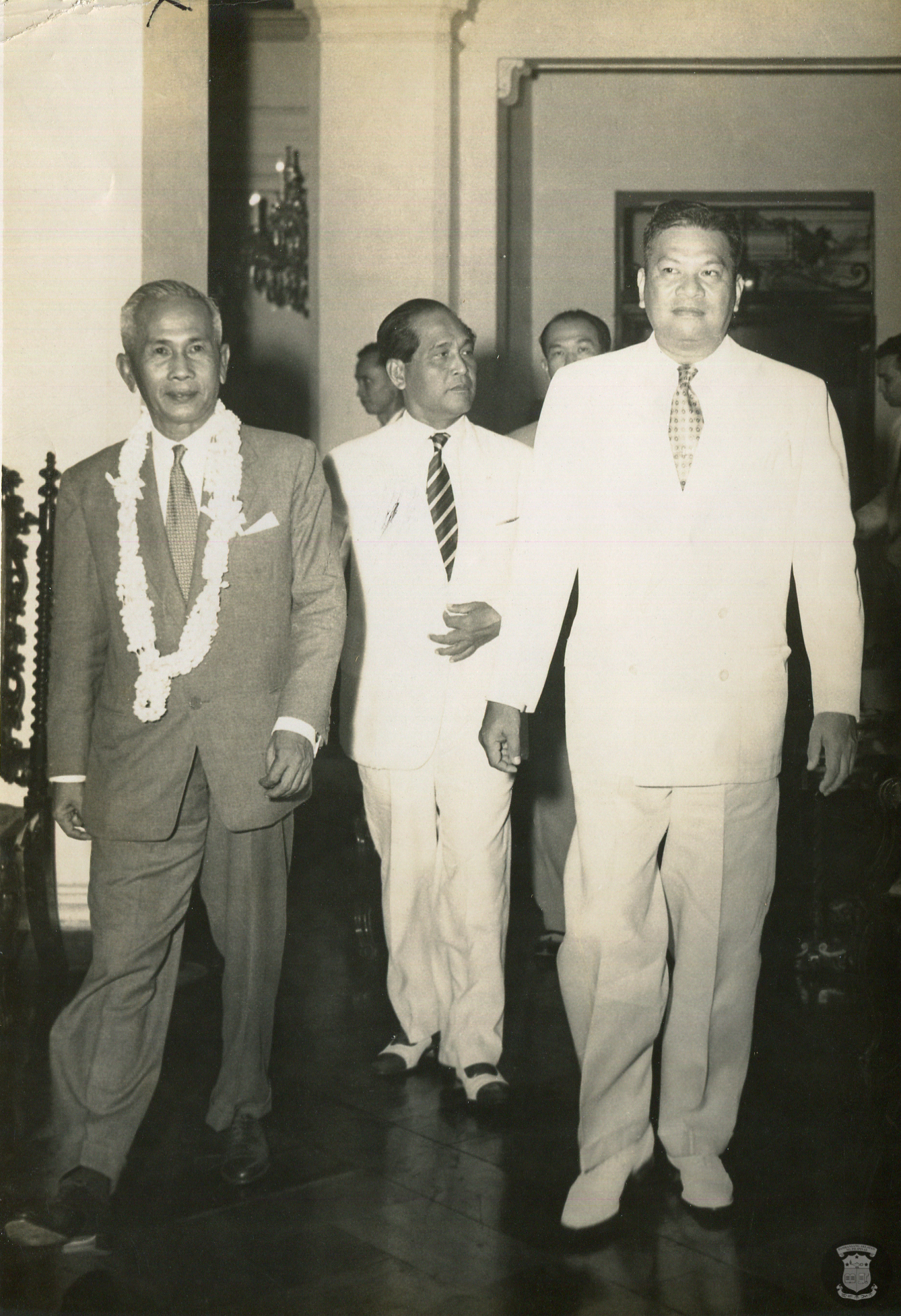
President Magsaysay (right) in 1957

As President, he was a close friend and supporter of the United States and a vocal spokesman against communism during the Cold War. He led the foundation of the Southeast Asia Treaty Organization, also known as the Manila Pact of 1954, that aimed to defeat communist-Marxist movements in Southeast Asia, South Asia and the Southwestern Pacific.

During his term, he made Malacañang literally a "house of the people", opening its gates to the public. One example of his integrity followed a demonstration flight aboard a new plane belonging to the Philippine Air Force (PAF): President Magsaysay asked what the operating costs per hour were for that type of aircraft, then wrote a personal check to the PAF, covering the cost of his flight. He restored the people's trust in the military and in the government.

Magsaysay's administration was considered one of the cleanest and most corruption-free in modern Philippine history; his rule is often cited as the Philippines' "Golden Years". Trade and industry flourished, the Philippine military was at its prime, and the country gained international recognition in sports, culture, and foreign affairs. The Philippines placed second on a ranking of Asia's clean and well-governed countries.

Supported by the United States, Magsaysay was elected president in 1953 on a populist platform. He promised sweeping economic reform, and made progress in land reform by promoting the resettlement of poor people in the Catholic north into traditionally Muslim areas. Though this relieved population pressure in the north, it heightened religious hostilities. Remnants of the communist Hukbalahap were defeated by Magsaysay. He was extremely popular with the common people, and his death in an airplane crash in March 1957 dealt a serious blow to national morale. At this time, the Philippines joined the United Nations in defending South Korea from North Korean invasions. The Philippines was the first country in Southeast Asia to recognize South Korean independence and was the first to send military units to fight on South Korea's behalf.

=== Administration of Carlos P. Garcia (1957–1961) ===
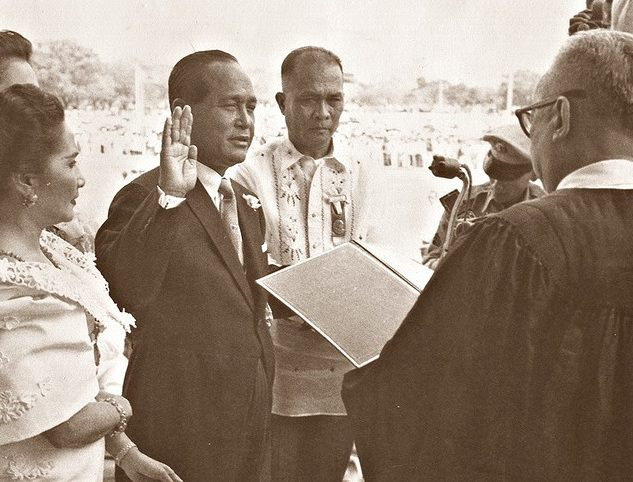
Garcia inaugurated as president in 1957

Carlos P. Garcia succeeded to the presidency after Magsaysay's death, and was elected to a four-year term in the election of November that same year. His administration emphasized the nationalist theme of "Filipino first", arguing that the Filipino people should be given the chances to improve the country's economy.

Garcia successfully negotiated for the United States' relinquishment of large military land reservations. However, his administration lost popularity on issues of government corruption as his term advanced.

=== Administration of Diosdado Macapagal (1961–1965) ===
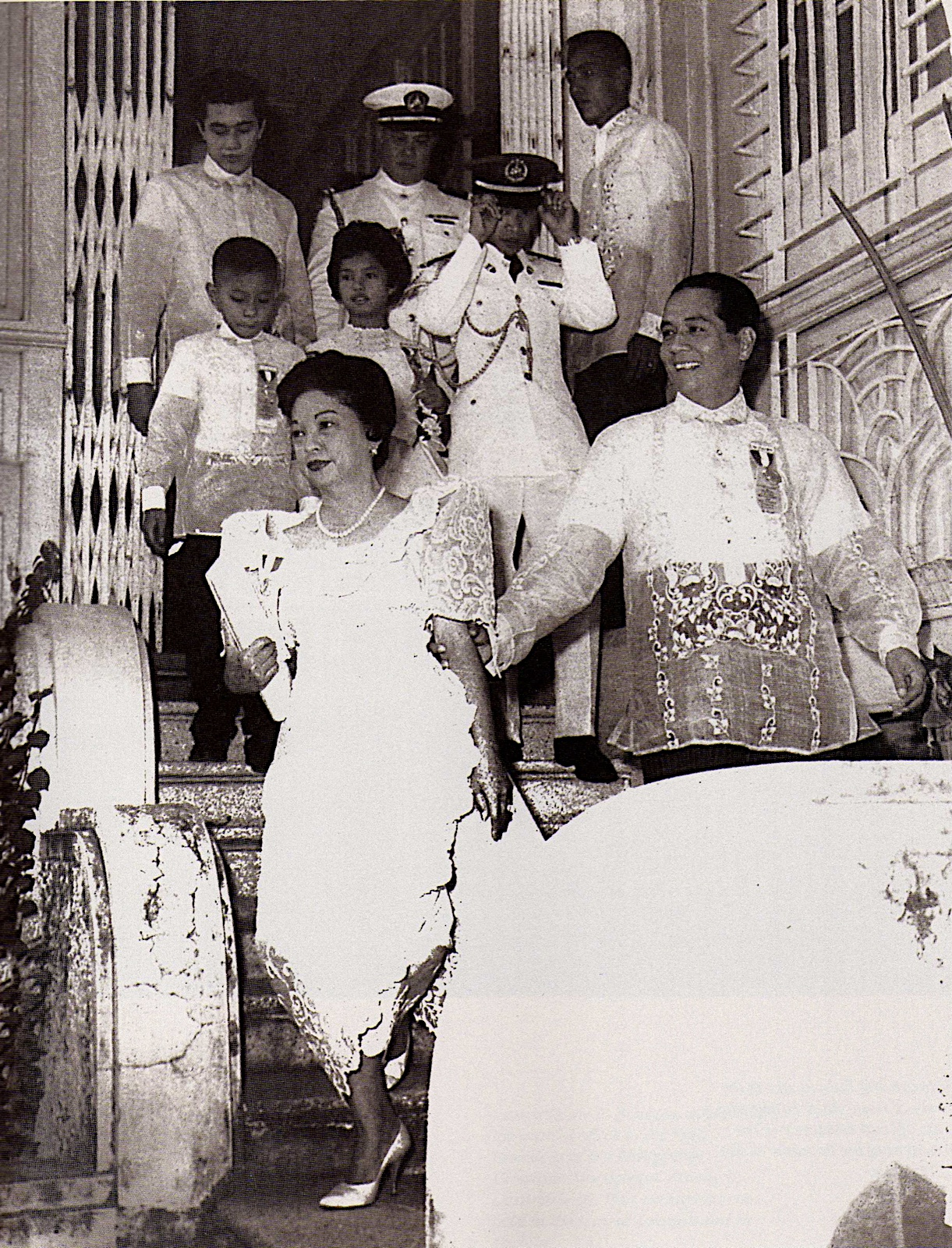
Diosdado Macapagal departing for Malacañang

In the presidential elections held on November 14, 1961, Vice President Diosdado Macapagal defeated re-electionist President Carlos P. Garcia and Emmanuel Pelaez as a vice president. President Macapagal changed the independence day of the Philippines from July 4 to June 12.

The Agricultural Land Reform Code (RA 3844) was a major Philippine land reform law enacted in 1963 under President Macapagal.

== Marcos era ==
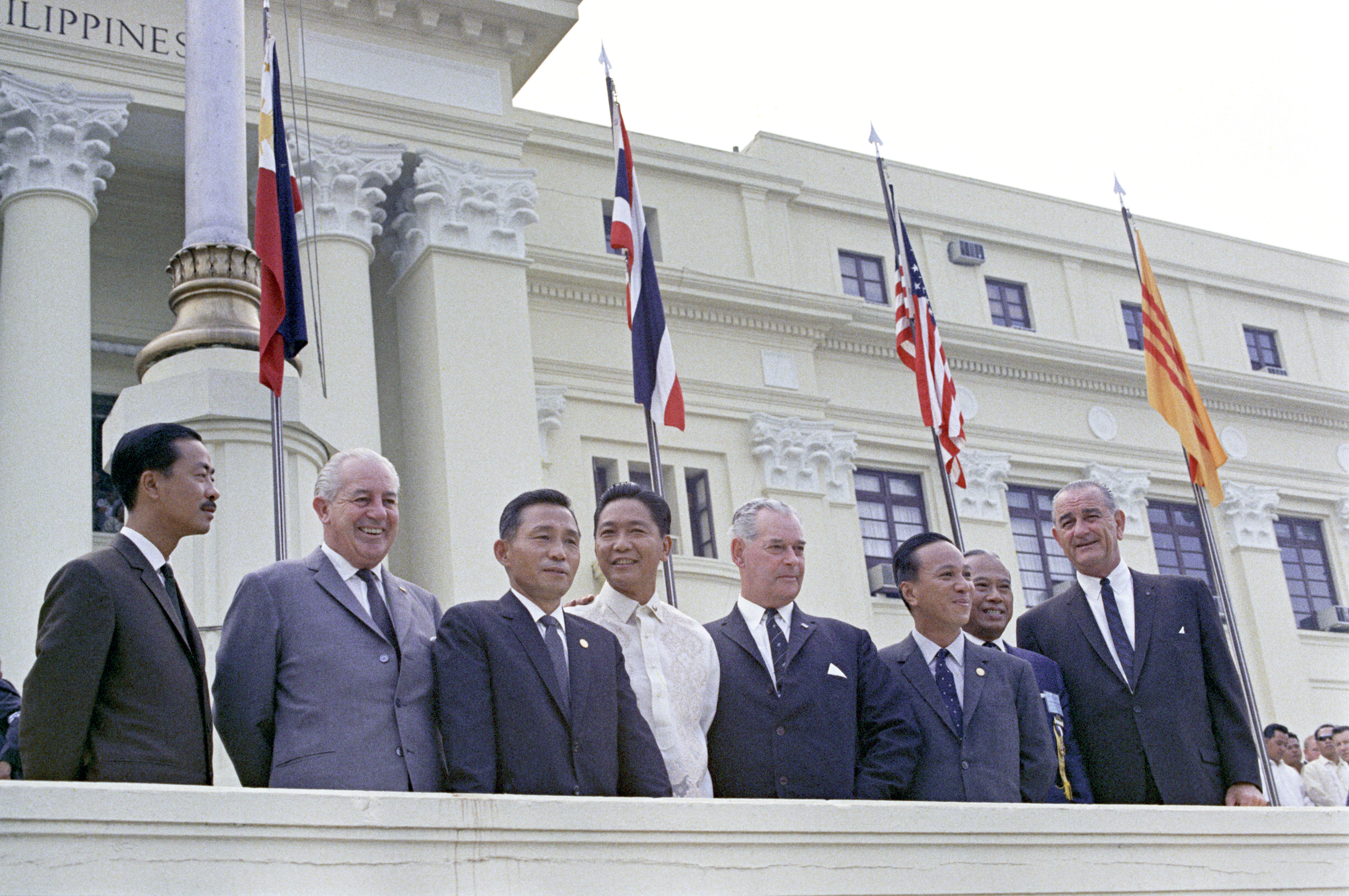
The participating leaders of the Manila Summit Conference in front of the Congress Building in Manila, hosted by Philippine President Ferdinand Marcos (4th from left) on October 24, 1966.

Macapagal ran for re-election in 1965, but was defeated by his former party-mate, Senate President Ferdinand Marcos, who had switched to the Nacionalista Party. Early in his presidency, Marcos initiated public works projects and intensified tax collection. In a failed attempt to retake east Sabah, the Jabidah massacre, where Muslim Tausug Filipinos were killed by the Philippine Army, occurred under the authority of Marcos. Due to his popularity among Christians, Marcos was re-elected president in 1969, becoming the first president of the Philippines to get a second term. Crime and civil disobedience increased. The Communist Party of the Philippines formed the New People's Army and the Moro National Liberation Front continued to fight for an independent Muslim nation in Mindanao. An explosion which killed opposition lawmakers during the proclamation rally of the senatorial slate of the Liberal Party on August 21, 1971, led Marcos to suspend the writ of habeas corpus. Protests surged and the writ was restored on January 11, 1972.

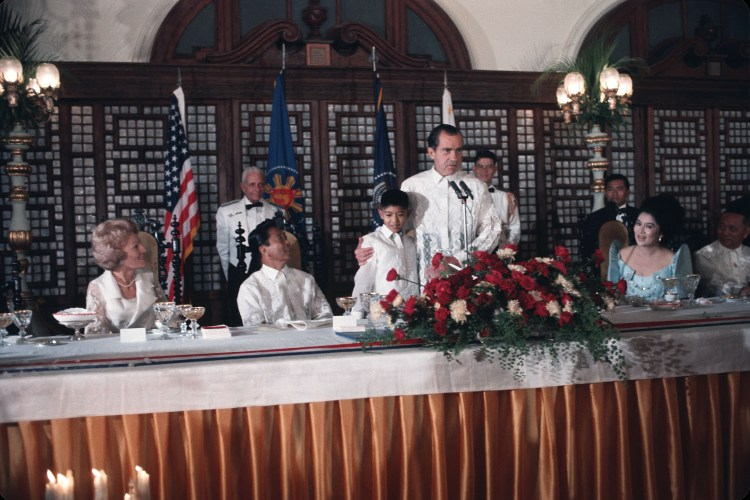
The Marcoses and the Nixons at the Malacañang Palace

=== Martial law ===
Amid the growing popularity of the opposition, Marcos declared martial law on September 21, 1972, by virtue of Proclamation No. 1081 to stifle dissent. Marcos justified the declaration by citing the threat of Communist insurgency and the alleged ambush of defense secretary Juan Ponce Enrile. Ruling by decree, Marcos curtailed press freedom and other civil liberties, abolished Congress, closed down major media establishments, ordered the arrest of opposition leaders and militant activists, including his staunchest critics: senators Benigno Aquino Jr., Jovito R. Salonga, and José W. Diokno. Crime rates plunged dramatically after a curfew was implemented. Many protesters, students, and political opponents were forced to go into exile, and a number were killed.

A constitutional convention, which had been called for in 1970 to replace the colonial 1935 Constitution, continued the work of framing a new constitution after the declaration of martial law. The new constitution went into effect in early 1973, changing the form of government from presidential to parliamentary and allowing Marcos to stay in power beyond 1973. Marcos claimed that martial law was the prelude to creating a "New Society", which he would rule for more than two decades. The economy during the 1970s was robust, due to previous engagements by various administrations. However, the economy suffered after incurring massive debt and downgrading prospects of the Philippines under martial rule, while the wife of the president, Imelda Marcos, lived in high society.

The human rights abuses under the dictatorship particularly targeted political opponents, student activists, journalists, religious workers, farmers, and others who fought back against the administration. Based on the documentation of Amnesty International, Task Force Detainees of the Philippines, and similar human rights monitoring entities, the dictatorship was marked by 3,257 known extrajudicial killings, 35,000 documented tortures, 77 'disappeared', and 70,000 incarcerations.

Some 2,520 of the 3,257 murder victims were tortured and mutilated before their bodies were dumped in various places for the public to discover – a tactic meant to sow fear among the public, which came to be known as "salvaging." Some bodies were even cannibalized.

=== Fourth Republic ===
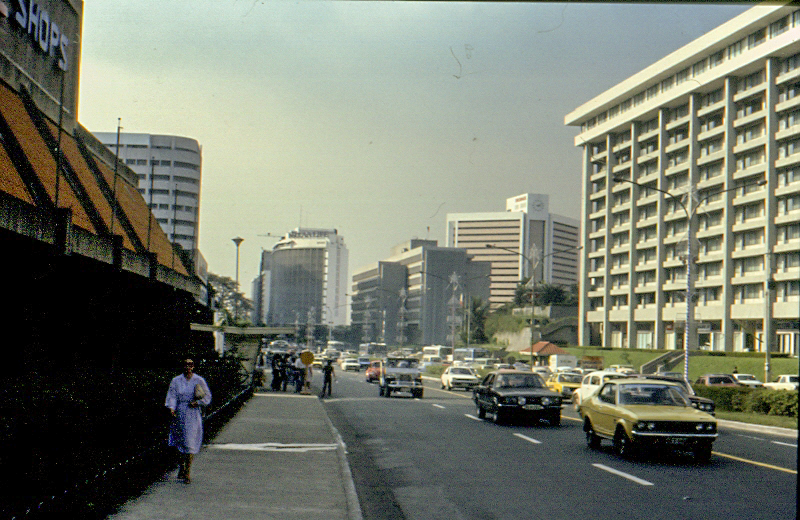
Manila circa 1980s

Marcos officially lifted martial law on January 17, 1981. However, he retained much of the government's power for arrest and detention. Corruption and nepotism as well as civil unrest contributed to a serious decline in economic growth and development under Marcos, whose own health faced obstacles due to lupus. The political opposition boycotted the 1981 presidential elections, which pitted Marcos against retired general Alejo Santos, in protest over his control over the results. Marcos won by a margin of over 16 million votes, allowing him to have another six-year term under the new Constitution that his administration crafted. Finance Minister Cesar Virata was eventually appointed to succeed Marcos as Prime Minister.

In 1983, opposition leader Ninoy Aquino was assassinated at Manila International Airport upon his return to the Philippines after a long period of exile. This coalesced popular dissatisfaction with Marcos and began a succession of events, including pressure from the United States, that culminated in a snap presidential election in February 1986. The opposition united under Aquino's widow, Corazon Aquino. The official election canvasser, the Commission on Elections (Comelec), declared Marcos the winner of the election. However, there was a large discrepancy between the Comelec results and that of Namfrel, an accredited poll watcher. The allegedly fraudulent result was rejected by local and international observers. Cardinal Jaime Sin declared support for Corazon Aquino, which encouraged popular revolts. General Fidel Ramos and Defense Minister Juan Ponce Enrile withdrew their support for Marcos. A peaceful civilian-military uprising, now popularly called the People Power Revolution, forced Marcos into exile and installed Corazon Aquino as president on February 25, 1986. The administration of Marcos has been called by various sources as a kleptocracy and a conjugal dictatorship.

== Fifth Republic (1986–present) ==
=== Administration of Corazon Aquino (1986–1992) ===
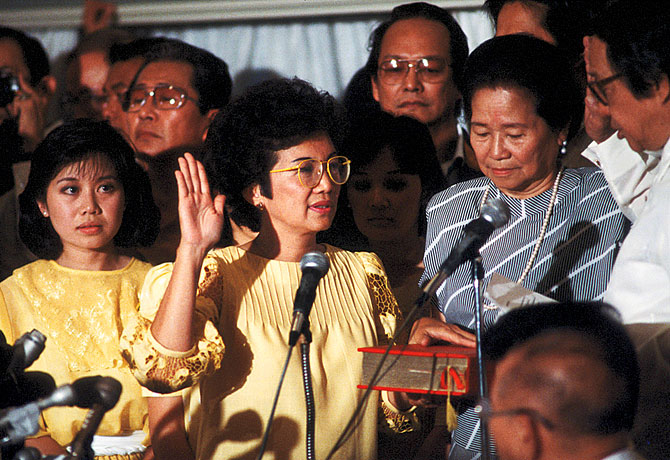
Corazon Aquino, widow of the assassinated opposition leader Ninoy Aquino, takes the Oath of Office on February 25, 1986

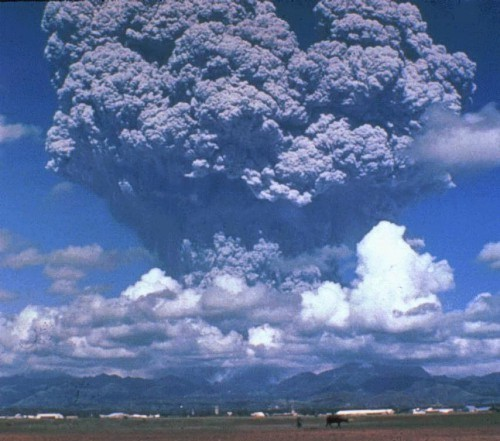
Mount Pinatubo erupted in 1991.

Corazon Aquino immediately formed an emergency government to try stabilizing the country's situation that provided for a transitional "Freedom Constitution". A new permanent constitution would later be ratified and enacted in February 1987.

The constitution crippled presidential power to declare martial law, proposed the creation of autonomous regions in the Cordilleras and Muslim Mindanao, and restored the presidential form of government and the bicameral Congress.

Progress was made in revitalizing democratic institutions and respect for civil liberties, but Aquino's administration was also viewed as weak and fractious, and a return to full political stability and economic development was hampered by several attempted coups staged by disaffected members of the Philippine military.

Economic growth was additionally hampered by a series of natural disasters, including the 1991 eruption of Mount Pinatubo that left 700 dead and 200,000 homeless.

During the Aquino presidency, Manila witnessed six unsuccessful coup attempts, the most serious occurring in December 1989.

In 1991, the Philippine Senate rejected a treaty that would have allowed a 10-year extension of the U.S. military bases in the country. The United States turned over Clark Air Base in Pampanga to the government in November, and Subic Bay Naval Base in Zambales in December 1992, ending almost a century of U.S. military presence in the Philippines.

=== Administration of Fidel V. Ramos (1992–1998) ===
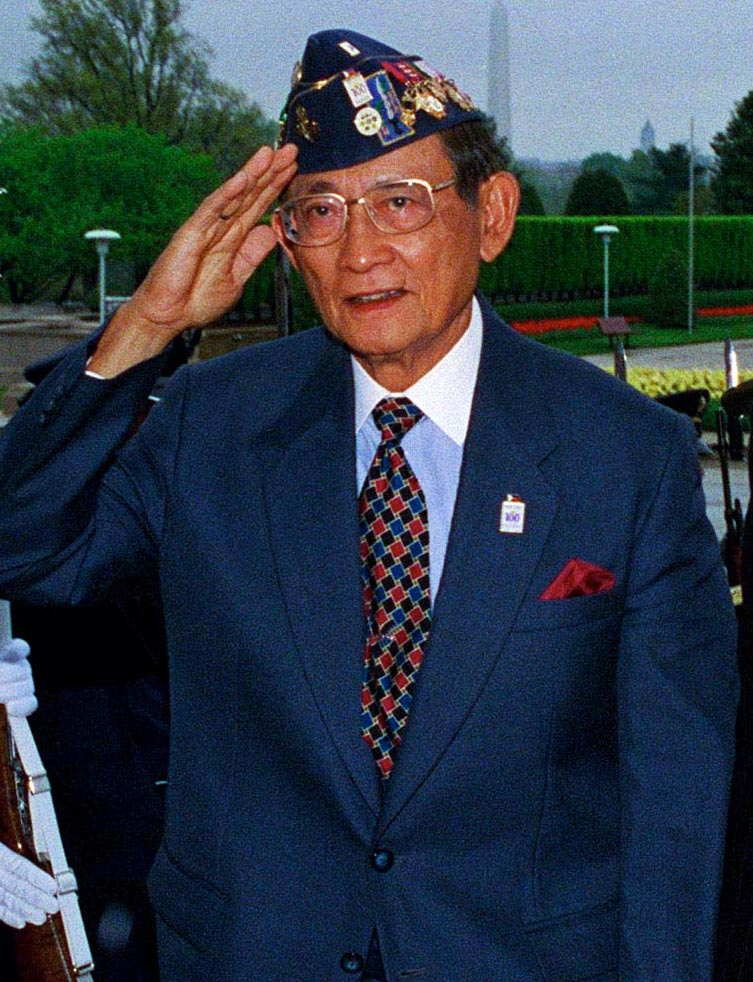
Ramos inaugurated as president in 1992

In the 1992 elections, Defense Secretary Fidel V. Ramos, endorsed by Aquino, won the presidency with just 23.6% of the vote in a field of seven candidates. Early in his administration, Ramos declared "national reconciliation" his highest priority and worked at building a coalition to overcome the divisiveness of the Aquino years.

He legalized the Communist Party and laid the groundwork for talks with communist insurgents, Muslim separatists, and military rebels, attempting to convince them to cease their armed activities against the government. In June 1994, Ramos signed into law a general conditional amnesty covering all rebel groups, and Philippine military and police personnel accused of crimes committed while fighting the insurgents.

In October 1995, the government signed an agreement bringing the military insurgency to an end. A peace agreement with the Moro National Liberation Front (MNLF), a major separatist group fighting for an independent homeland in Mindanao, was signed in 1996, ending the 24-year-old struggle. However, an MNLF splinter group, the Moro Islamic Liberation Front, continued the armed struggle for an Islamic state.

Efforts by Ramos supporters to gain passage of an amendment that would allow him to run for a second term were met with large-scale protests, leading Ramos to declare he would not seek re-election.

On his presidency the death penalty was revived in the light of the rape-slay case of UPLB students Eileen Sarmienta and Allan Gomez in 1993 and the first person to be executed was Leo Echegaray in 1999.

=== Administration of Joseph Estrada (1998–2001) ===
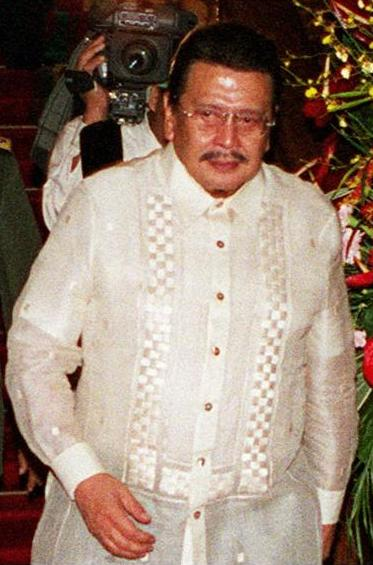
President Estrada in 2000

Joseph Estrada, a former movie actor who had served as Ramos' vice president, was elected president by a landslide victory in 1998. His election campaign pledged to help the poor and develop the country's agricultural sector. He enjoyed widespread popularity, particularly among the poor. Estrada assumed office amid the Asian Financial Crisis. The economy did, however, recover from a low −0.6% growth in 1998 to a moderate growth of 3.4% by 1999.

Like his predecessor there was a similar attempt to change the 1987 constitution. The process is termed as CONCORD or Constitutional Correction for Development. Unlike Charter change under Ramos and Arroyo the CONCORD proposal, according to its proponents, would only amend the 'restrictive' economic provisions of the constitution that is considered as impeding the entry of more foreign investments in the Philippines. However, it was not successful in amending the constitution.

After the worsening secessionist movement in Mindanao in April 2000, Estrada declared an "all-out-war" against the Moro Islamic Liberation Front (MILF). The government later captured 46 MILF camps including the MILF's headquarters, Camp Abubakar.

In October 2000, however, Estrada was accused of having accepted millions of pesos in payoffs from illegal gambling businesses. He was impeached by the House of Representatives but his impeachment trial in the Senate broke down when the senate voted to block examination of the president's bank records. In response, massive street protests erupted demanding Estrada's resignation. Faced with street protests, cabinet resignations, and a withdrawal of support from the armed forces, Estrada resigned from office on January 20, 2001.

=== Administration of Gloria Macapagal Arroyo (2001–2010) ===
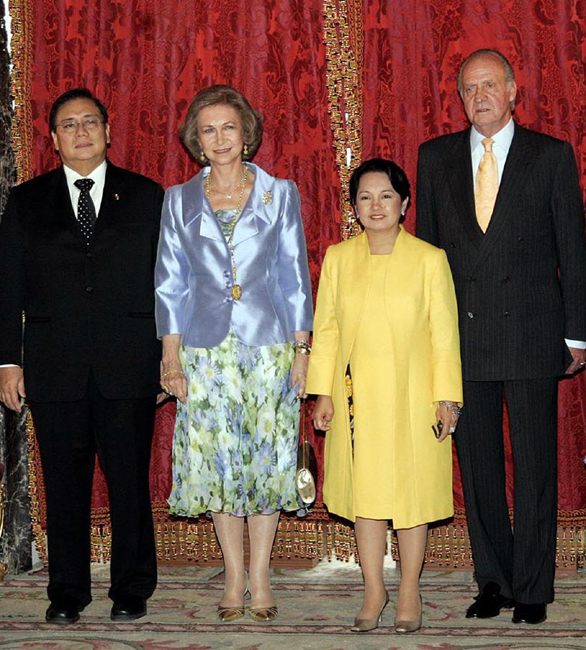
President Arroyo between the monarchs of Spain in 2006

Vice President Gloria Macapagal Arroyo (the daughter of President Diosdado Macapagal) was sworn in as Estrada's successor on the day of his departure. Her accession to power was further legitimized by the mid-term congressional and local elections held four months later, when her coalition won an overwhelming victory.

Arroyo's initial term in office was marked by fractious coalition politics as well as a military mutiny in Manila in July 2003 that led her to declare a month-long nationwide state of rebellion. Later on in December 2002 she said would not run in the May 10, 2004, presidential election, but she reversed herself in October 2003 and decided to join the race anyway.

She was elected and sworn in for her own six-year term as president on June 30, 2004. In 2005, a tape of a wiretapped conversation surfaced bearing the voice of Arroyo apparently asking an election official if her margin of victory could be maintained. The tape sparked protests calling for Arroyo's resignation. Arroyo admitted to inappropriately speaking to an election official, but denied allegations of fraud and refused to step down. Attempts to impeach the president failed later that year.

Halfway through her second term, Arroyo unsuccessfully attempted to push for an overhaul of the constitution to transform the present presidential-bicameral republic into a federal parliamentary-unicameral form of government, which critics describe would be a move that would allow her to stay in power as Prime Minister.

Her term saw the completion of infrastructure projects like Line 2 in 2004.

Numerous other scandals (such as the Maguindanao massacre, wherein 58 people were killed, and the unsuccessful NBN-ZTE broadband deal) took place in the dawn of her administration.

On May 20, 2008, the K–12 curriculum was implemented in the Philippines through the Omnibus Education Reform Act of 2008 filed by Mar Roxas and further emphasized by ASEAN Charter on December 15, 2008, adding two more years to the country's pre-university cycle. Its implementation process took 9 years and three presidents from May 2008 to June 5, 2017, from Arroyo to Rodrigo Duterte.

She formally ended her term as president on June 30, 2010 (wherein she was succeeded by Senator Benigno Aquino III) and ran for a seat in congress the same year (becoming the second president after Jose P. Laurel to run for lower office following the presidency).

=== Administration of Benigno Aquino III (2010–2016) ===
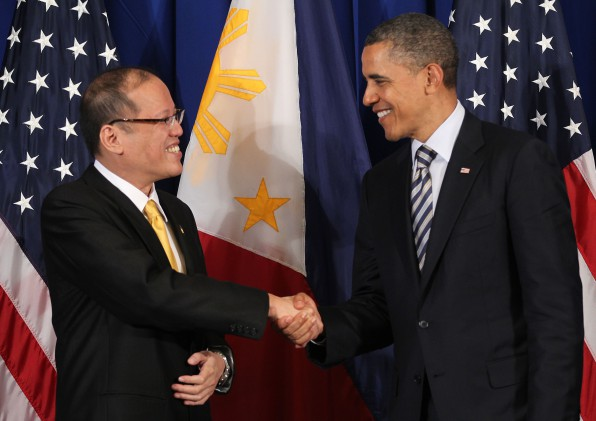
President Aquino with U.S. President Barack Obama in 2011

Benigno Aquino III, the son of president Corazon C. Aquino, began his presidency on June 30, 2010. His administration claimed to be focused on major reforms that would bring greater transparency, reduced poverty, reduced corruption, and a booming market which will give birth to a newly industrialized nation.

He continued the 9-year implementation process of the K–12 curriculum that was started under his predecessor Gloria Macapagal Arroyo in 2008. Part of the it is the new curriculum's effectivity on April 24, 2012. To maintain continuity, Kindergarten was made compulsory through Kidergarten Education Reform Act of 2012 and the further 12 years by Enhanced Basic Education Act of 2013.

The 2010 Manila hostage crisis caused deeply strained relations between Manila and Hong Kong for a time.

The Sultanate of Panay, the newset of 21 in the country, was formally established covering 10 000 Muslims in the island.

Tensions regarding Sabah due to the Sultanate of Sulu's claim gradually rose during the early years of his administration. Standoffs in Sabah between The Sultanate of Sulu's Royal Army and the Malaysian forces struck in 2013. A surprise incursion by the supporters of the Sultanate of Sulu on Sabah resulted in the killing of civilians and members of the Malaysian armed forces. Following this attack, Malaysia ceased the annual cession of approximately $1,000 to the Sultan's heirs, which it had honored as part of an 1878 agreement with a British trading company over the use of the Sultanate's territory. In response to Malaysia's suspension of the annual payments, the Sulu claimants sought international arbitration, demanding US$32 billion. In January 2022, Spanish arbitrator Gonzalo Stampa ruled in their favor, awarding a historic US$14.9 billion. However, on 27 June 2023, the French Court of Appeals annulled the award, delivering a landmark victory for Malaysia. Recently, Stampa was convicted of contempt of court for defying rulings from the Madrid High Court and sentenced to six months in prison.

In 2012, the Framework Agreement on the Bangsamoro was signed to create the Bangsamoro Government in Mindanao. In response, the Bangsamoro Islamic Freedom Fighters (BIFF) was assembled by religious extremists with the goal of seceding from the Philippines.

The economy performed well at 7.2% GDP growth, the second fastest in Asia.

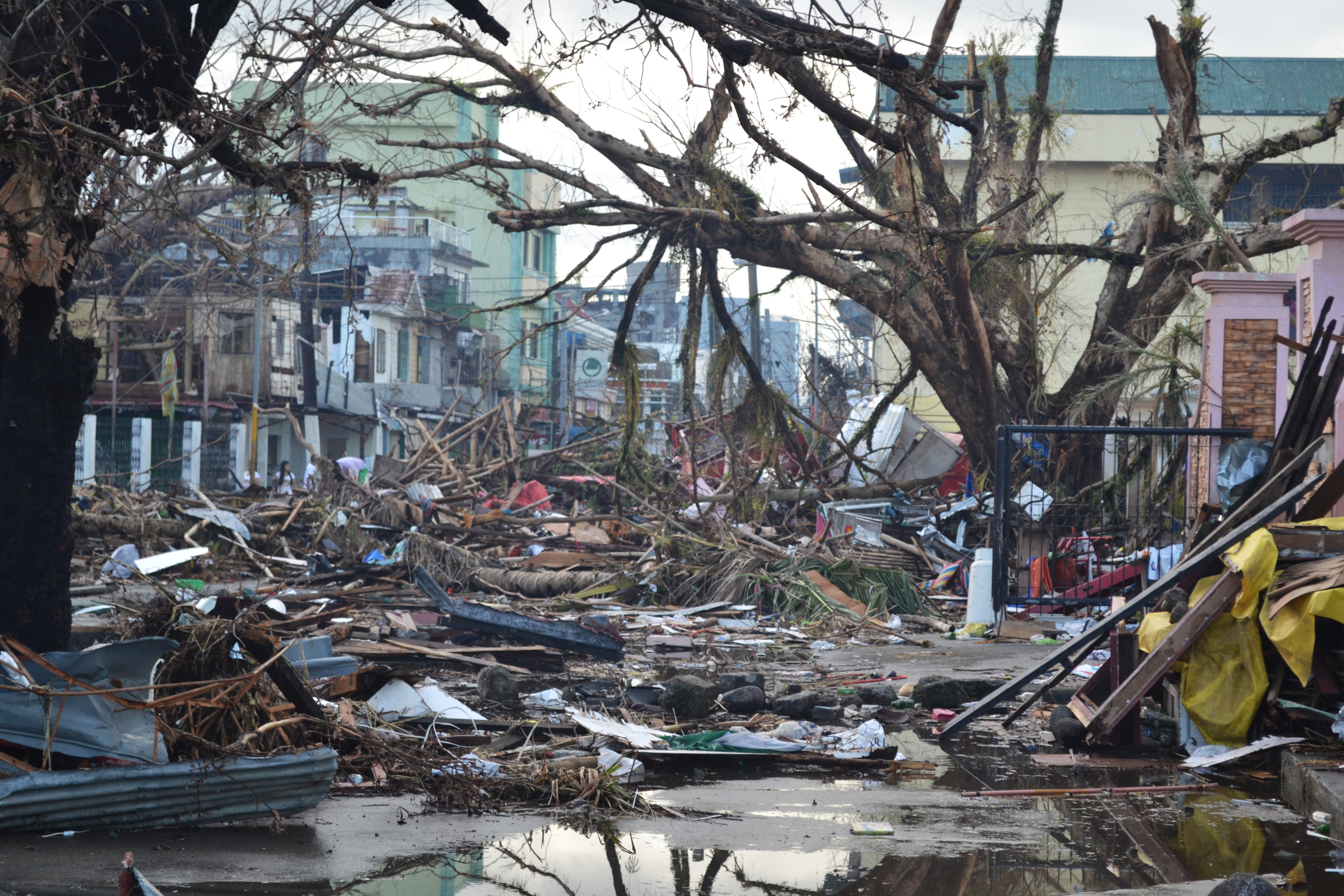
Aftermath of Typhoon Haiyan in Tacloban, Leyte

The country was hit by Typhoon Yolanda (Haiyan) on November 8, 2013, which heavily devastated the Visayas. Massive rehabilitation efforts by foreign world powers sending aid, devolved into chaos following the revelations that the administration and that the government had not been properly handing out the aid packages and preference for political maneuvering over the safety of the people, leading to mass deterioration of food and medical supplies.

In 2014, the Comprehensive Agreement on the Bangsamoro was signed after 17 years of negotiation with the Moro Islamic Liberation Front (MILF), a move which sought to bring peace in Mindanao and the Sulu. When US President Barack Obama visited the Philippines on April 28, 2014, Aquino signed the Enhanced Defense Cooperation Agreement, facilitating the return of United States Armed Forces bases into the country.

From January 15 to 19, 2015, Pope Francis stayed in the Philippines for a series of publicity tours and paid visits to the victims of Typhoon Haiyan. On January 25, 2015, 44 members of the Philippine National Police-Special Action Force (PNP-SAF) were killed during an encounter between MILF and BIFF in Mamasapano, Maguindanao, leading to a delay in the passage of the Bangsamoro Basic Law.

Under Aquino's presidency, the Philippines has had controversial clashes with the People's Republic of China on a number of issues (such as the standoff in Scarborough Shoal in the South China Sea and the dispute over the Spratly Islands). This resulted in the proceedings of the Philippines to file a sovereignty case against China in a global arbitration tribunal. Later on in 2014, the Aquino Administration then filed a case to the Arbitration Tribunal in The Hague which challenged Beijing's claim in the South China Sea after Chinese ships were accused of harassing a small Philippine vessel carrying goods for stationed military personnel in the South Thomas Shoal where an old Philippine ship had been stationed for many years.

On January 12, 2016, the Philippine Supreme Court upheld the Enhanced Defense Cooperation Agreement paving the way for the return of United States Armed Forces bases into the country. On March 23, 2016, Diwata-1 was launched to the International Space Station (ISS), becoming the country's first micro-satellite and the first satellite to be built and designed by Filipinos.

=== Administration of Rodrigo Duterte (2016–2022) ===
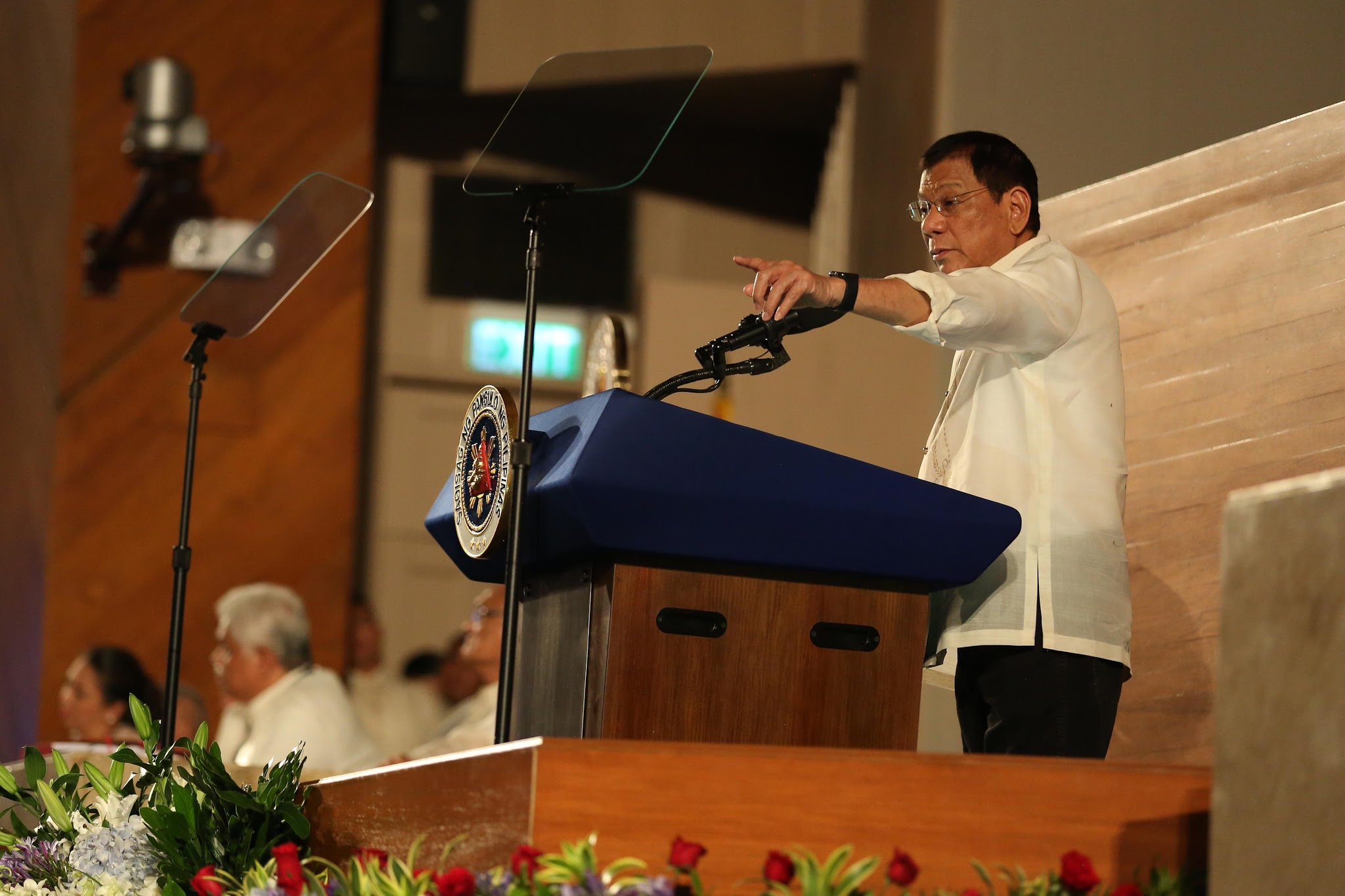
Rodrigo Duterte delivering his first State of the Nation Address.

Davao City mayor Rodrigo Duterte succeeded Aquino and became the first president from Mindanao. Under Duterte's first 100 days, the government launched a 24-hour complaint office accessible to the public through a nationwide hotline, 8888, and changed the nationwide emergency telephone number from 117 to 911. Duterte launched an intensified anti-drug campaign to fulfill a campaign promise of wiping out criminality in six months; by August 2019, the death toll for the war on drugs was 5,779.

The implementation of K–12 from 2008, carried over from his predecessors Arroyo and Aquino III, continued throughout Duterte administration until the new curriculum was implemented on Grade 6 on June 5, 2017, which entirely phased out the older 1945–2017 K–4th Year system first used on May 28, 1945, and completed the 9-year process of the former.

On July 12, 2016, the Permanent Court of Arbitration ruled in favor of the Philippines in its case against China's claims in the South China Sea; the ruling deprived surface features in the contested area of territorial-generating status, effectively deflating China's nine-dash line territorial claims. Later that November, president Ferdinand Marcos' remains were buried at the Libingan ng mga Bayani (the country's official cemetery for heroes) after the Supreme Court of the Philippines ruled in favor of the burial, provoking protests from various groups.

Following clashes between government forces and the Maute group in Marawi, Duterte, on May 23, 2017, signed Proclamation No. 216 declaring a 60-day martial law in Mindanao. To attain inclusive economic growth and improve quality of life in the country, in 2017, the Duterte administration launched its socioeconomic policy, DuterteNomics, in which infrastructure development and industrialization were a significant part of. The policy included the Build! Build! Build! Infrastructure Plan, which aimed to sustain the country's economic growth and accelerate poverty reduction by developing transport infrastructure such as railways, roads, airports, and seaports, irrigation, and flood control projects. Duterte signed the Universal Access to Quality Tertiary Education Act, providing free tuition and exemption from other fees in public universities and colleges, as well as subsidies for those enrolled in private higher education institutions. Duterte also signed into law the Universal Health Care Act, the creation of the Department of Human Settlements and Urban Development, establishing a national cancer control program, and allowing subscribers to keep their mobile numbers for life.

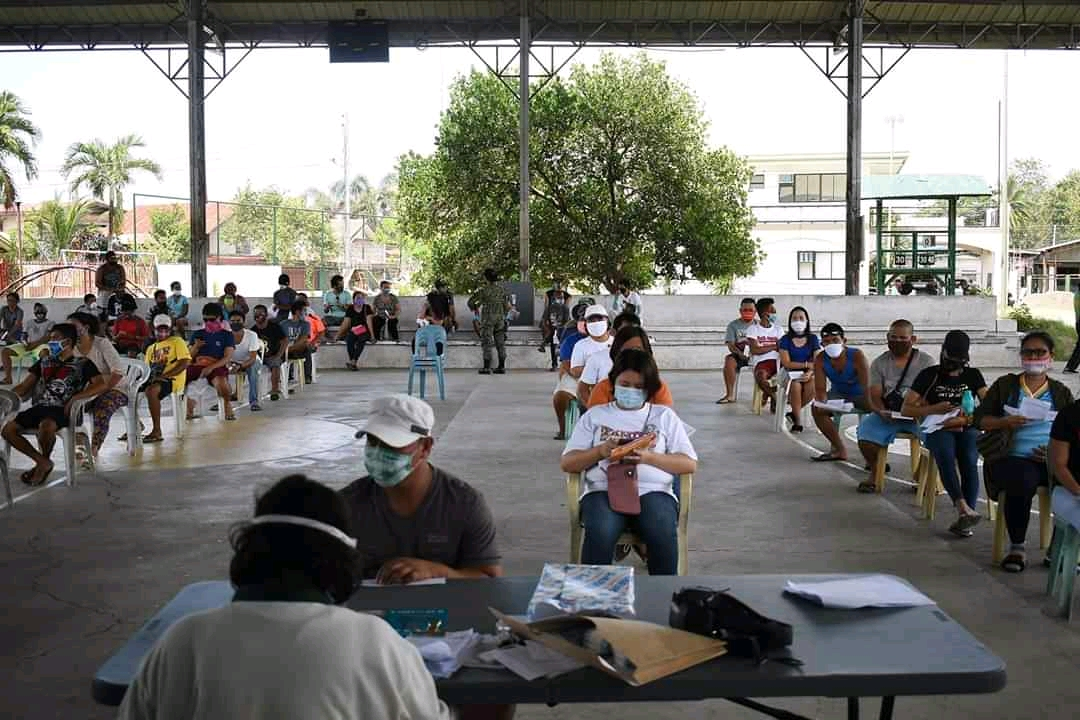
Covid-19, 2020.

In 2018, the Bangsamoro Organic Law was legislated into law and was ratified following a successful plebiscite a year later. The Bangsamoro transition period began, paving the way for the formal creation of the Bangsamoro ARMM.

=== Administration of Bongbong Marcos (2022–present) ===
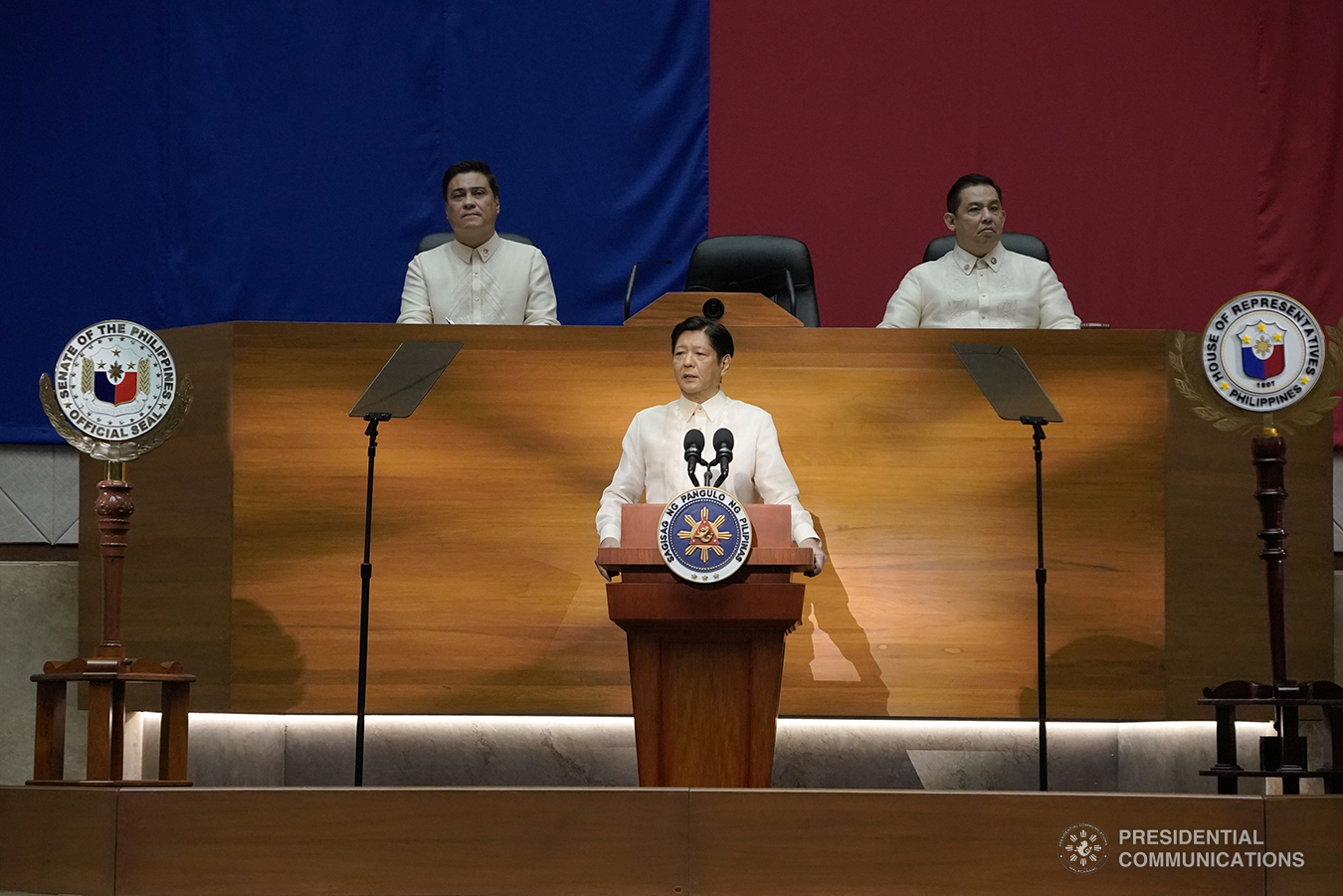
Marcos delivers his first State of the Nation Address on July 25, 2022, with Senate President Migz Zubiri (left) and House Speaker Martin Romualdez.

In May 2022, Ferdinand Marcos Jr. (known by his nickname "Bongbong"), son of former president and dictator Ferdinand Marcos, won the presidential election by a landslide. His vice presidential candidate was Sara Duterte, daughter of then-president Rodrigo Duterte. On June 30, 2022, Marcos was sworn in as the Philippine president and Sara Duterte was sworn in as vice-president. A few weeks after his inauguration as president, the 2022 Luzon earthquake hit Northern Luzon, resulting in 11 casualties and 615 people injured.

Bagong Pilipinas (transl. New Philippines), the administration's term for its brand of governance and leadership, was officially launched with a kick-off rally on January 28, 2024, at the Quirino Grandstand in Manila, the capital of the Philippines. It was attended by about 400,000 supporters with the participation of Vice President Sara Duterte, other key Malacañang officials, and Manila Mayor Honey Lacuna. The rally was streamed online to engage a wider audience beyond Manila.

As president, Marcos signed into law the creation of the Maharlika Investment Fund, the first sovereign wealth fund of the Philippines. Under his term, the Philippines ratified the RCEP in February, and entered into force in June 2023. Marcos also went on many foreign trips in hopes to attract more foreign investments in the country.

During Marcos' administration, the number of American citizens who lived in the country increased from 300,000 as of 2023, to 750,000 by year 2025, (forming 0.75% of the demographics) mainly due to his liberal visa policies. Furthermore, up to 250,000 Amerasians, (0.25% of the country), can be found living across the cities of Clark, Angeles, Manila, and Olongapo(When combined, American and Amerasian descent, form 1% of the population). Under Marcos' term despite the pressure of the US-Israel vs Iran war, the 2026 ASEAN summit held in the Philippines, had pushed through, and in the Philippines, East Timor's Catholic ally, was the first ASEAN summit wherein East Timor participated as a full member of ASEAN. This occurred simultaneously with the chairmanship of António Guterres who is the reigning Secretary-General of the United Nations and is of Portuguese and East Timorese ancestry.

== See also ==
- Archaeology of the Philippines
- Battles of Manila
- Battles of the Philippines
- Dambana
- Filipino nationalism
- Filipino Repatriation Act of 1935
- History of Asia
- History of Southeast Asia
- List of disasters in the Philippines
- List of Philippine historic sites
- List of presidents of the Philippines
- List of sovereign state leaders in the Philippines
- Military history of the Philippines
- National hero of the Philippines
- Politics of the Philippines
- Resident Commissioner of the Philippines
- Sovereignty of the Philippines
- Suyat
- Timeline of Philippine history
- Timeline of Philippine sovereignty
