= Economic history of the Philippines =

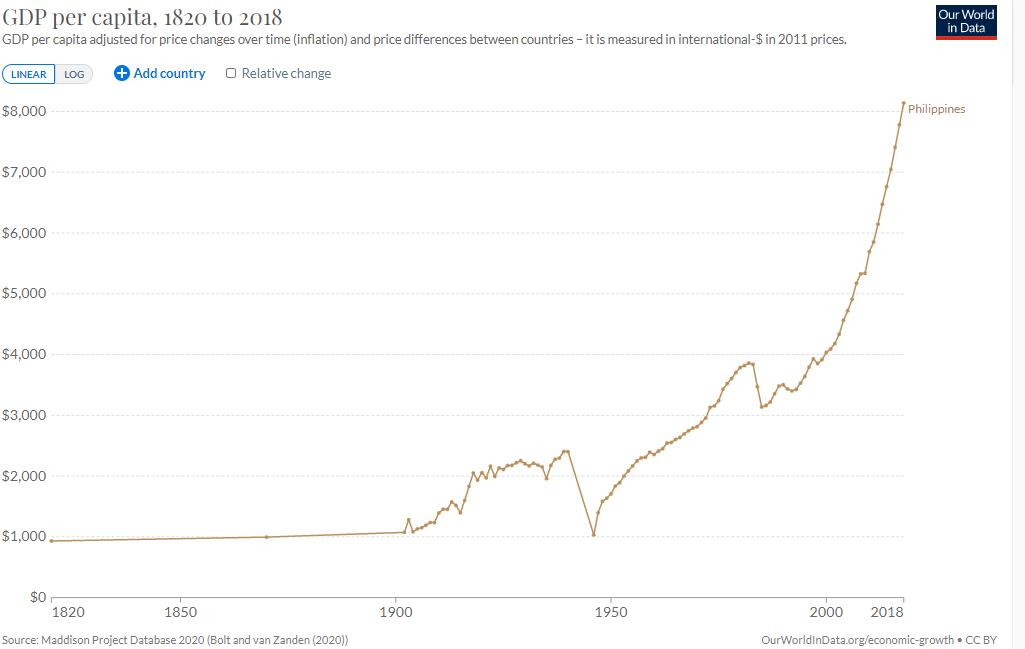
Real GDP per capita development of the Philippines

The economic history of the Philippines is shaped by its colonial past, evolving governance, and integration into the global economy.

Prior to Spanish colonization in the 16th century, the islands had a flourishing economy centered around agriculture, fisheries, and trade with neighboring countries like China, Japan, and Southeast Asia.

Under Spanish rule, the Philippines became a key hub in the Manila-Acapulco galleon trade, though the wealth primarily benefited colonial powers rather than local development.

During the American colonial period (1901–1946), the country saw significant economic reforms and infrastructure improvements, while the Philippine peso was pegged to the US dollar, facilitating trade and investment. After gaining independence in 1946, the Philippines experienced periods of growth and stagnation, with key phases of industrialization and agricultural reform, alongside challenges such as cronyism, political instability, and economic inequality.

In the modern era, the Philippines has shifted towards a more service-oriented economy, with sectors like business process outsourcing (BPO) and remittances from overseas Filipino workers playing critical roles in its development.

== Pre-colonial era (900s–1565) ==
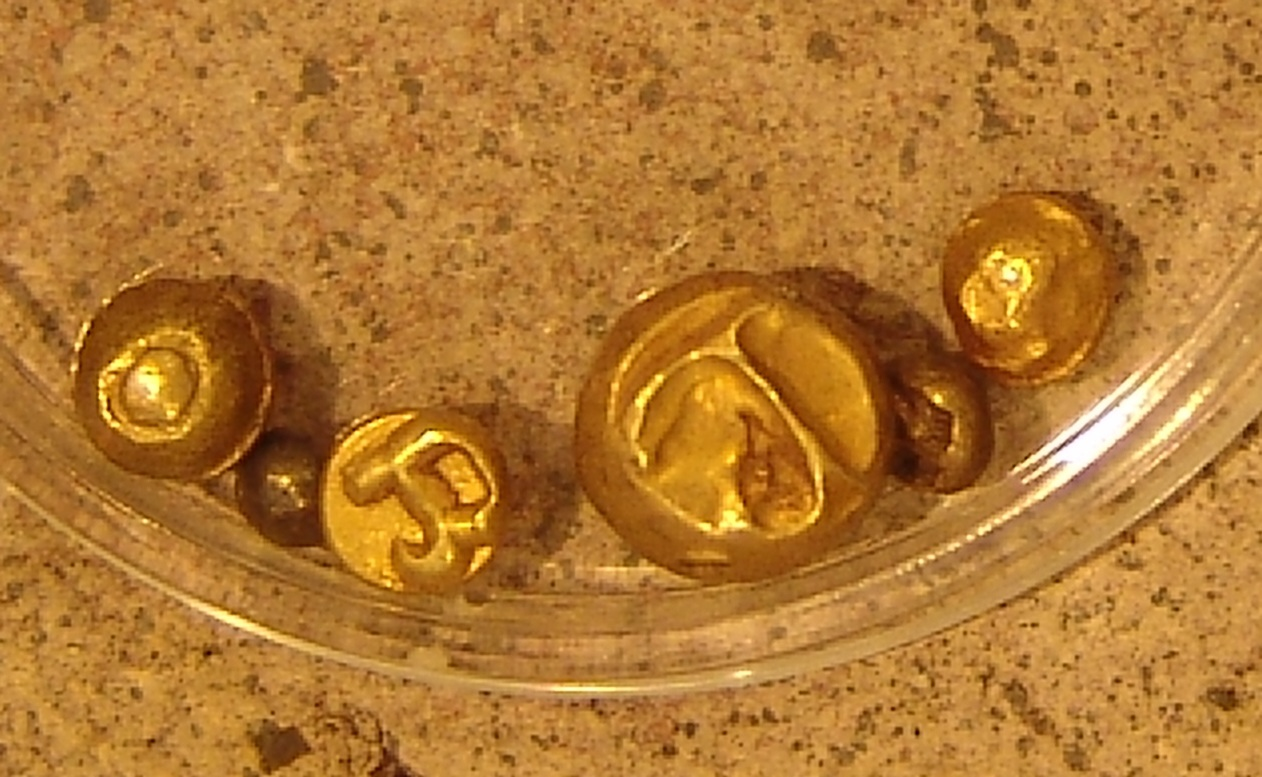
A collection of piloncitos in Manila Mint Museum

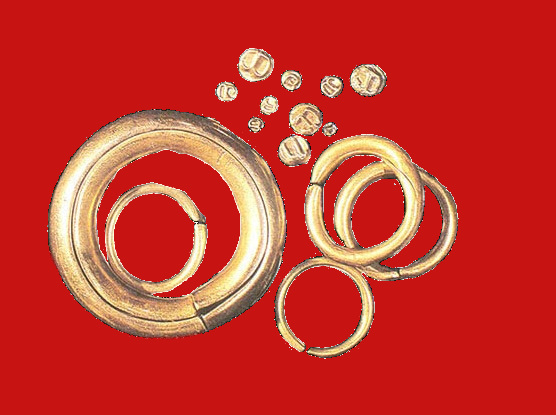
Barter rings along with piloncitos

During pre-colonial times, the Philippine Islands were composed of numerous kingdoms, and thalassocracies oversaw the large number of merchants coming to the islands for trade. Indian, Arab, Chinese and Japanese merchants were welcomed by these kingdoms, which were mostly located by riverbanks, coastal ports and central plains. The merchants traded for goods such as gold, rice, pots and other products. Foreign merchants, aside from bartering, also had to deal with loans-on-credit, hostage-exchange or outright raiding from Filipino kingdoms. However, the barter system was implemented most, at that time, and the pre-colonial people enjoyed a life filled with imported goods which reflected their fashion and lifestyle.

From the 12th century, a huge industry centered around the manufacture and trade of burnay clay pots, used for the storage of tea and other perishables, was set up in the northern Philippines with Japanese and Okinawan traders. These pots were known as 'Ruson-tsukuri' (Luzon-made) in Japanese, and were considered among the best storage vessels used for the purpose of keeping tea leaves and rice wine fresh. Hence, Ruson-Tsukuri pots became sought after in Northeast Asia. Each Philippine kiln had its own branding symbol, marked on the bottom of the Ruson-tsukuri by a single baybayin letter.

The people were skilled agriculturists, and the islands–especially Luzon–had a great abundance of rice, fowl, and wine as well as great numbers of carabaos, deer, wild boar and goats. In addition, there were great quantities of cotton and colored clothes, wax, honey and date palms produced by the natives. The precolonial state of Caboloan in Pangasinan often exported deer-skins to Japan and Okinawa. The Nation of Ma-i produced beeswax, cotton, true pearls, tortoise shell, medicinal betel nuts and yuta cloth in their trade with East Asia. Ma-i's vassal state of Sandao exports kapok, beeswax, native cloth, and coir matting. Its other vassal state, Pulilu, meanwhile, exports rare red and blue corals. By the early sixteenth century, the two largest polities of the Pasig River delta, Maynila and Tondo, established a shared monopoly on the trade of Chinese goods throughout the rest of the Philippine archipelago. The polity of Namayan had many industries including carpentry, masonry, and fishing. The Polity of Cainta also had similar industries.

The Visayas islands which is home to the Kedatuan of Madja-as, the Kedatuan of Dapitan, and the Rajahnate of Cebu on the other hand were abundant in rice, fish, cotton, swine, fowl, wax and honey. Leyte was said to produce two rice crops a year, and Pedro Chirino commented on the great rice and cotton harvests that were sufficient to feed and clothe the people.

In Mindanao, the Rajahnate of Butuan specialized in the mining of gold and the manufacture of jewellery. The Rajahnate of Sanmalan specialized in the transhipment of spices and an analysis of Sanmalan's Rajah Chulan's tribute to the Chinese Emperor, of aromatics, dates, glassware, ivory, peaches, refined sugar, and rose- water, show it had trade links with Western Asia which they leveraged to the Philippines. Later on, the nation was known to raid for slaves to sell in Java. The Sultanate of Maguindanao was known for the raising and harvesting of cinnamon. The Sultanate of Lanao had a fishing industry by lake Lanao and the Sultanate of Sulu had lively pearl-diving operations.

The kingdoms of ancient Philippines were active in international trade, and they used the ocean as natural highways. Ancient peoples were engaged in long-range trading with their Asian neighbors as far as west as Maldives and as far as north as Japan.

Some historians have proposed that they also had regular contact with other Austronesian people in Western Micronesia, because it was the only area in the Oceania that had rice crops, tuba (fermented coconut sap), and tradition of betel nut chewing when the first Europeans arrived there. The uncanny resemblance of complex body tattoos among the Visayans and those of Borneo also proved some interesting connection between Borneo and ancient Philippines. Magellan's chronicler, Antonio Pigafetta, mentioned that merchants and ambassadors from all surrounding areas came to pay tribute to the rajah of Sugbu (Rajahnate of Cebu) for the purpose of trade. While Magellan's crew were with the rajah, a representative from Siam was paying tribute to the rajah. Miguel López de Legazpi also wrote how merchants from Luzon and Mindoro had come to Cebu for trade, and he also mentioned how the Chinese merchants regularly came to Luzon for the same purpose. The Visayan Islands had earlier encounters with Greek traders in 21 AD. Its people enjoyed extensive trade contacts with other cultures. Indians, Japanese, Arabs, Vietnamese, Cambodians, Thais, Malays and Indonesians as traders or immigrants.

Aside from trade relations, the natives were also involved in aquaculture and fishing. The natives made use of the salambao, a type of raft that utilizes a large fishing net which is lowered into the water via a type of lever made of two criss-crossed poles. Night fishing was accomplished with the help of candles made from a particular type of resin similar to the copal of Mexico. Use of safe pens for incubation and protection of the small fry from predators was also observed, and this method astonished the Spaniards at that time. During fishing, large mesh nets were also used by the natives to protect the young and ensure future good catches.

From the early 1500s to as late as the 1560s, people from Luzon, Philippines; were referred to in Portuguese Malacca as Luções, and they set up many overseas communities across Southeast Asia where they participated in trading ventures and military campaigns in Burma, Malacca and Eastern Timor as traders and mercenaries, even reaching as far as Tokyo and Sri Lanka. One prominent Luções was Regimo de Raja, who was a spice magnate and a Temenggung (Jawi: تمڠݢوڠ) (Governor and Chief General) in Portuguese Malacca. He was also the head of an armada which traded and protected commerce between the Indian Ocean, the Strait of Malacca, the South China Sea, and the medieval maritime principalities of the Philippines.

== Spanish colonial period ==
=== New Spain (1565–1815) ===
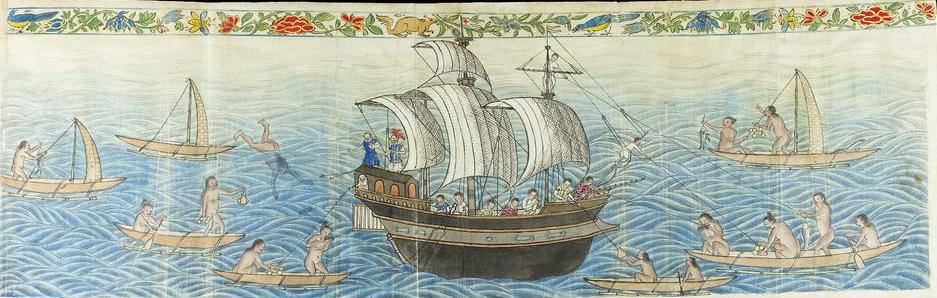
Manila Galleon (c. 1590 Boxer Codex)

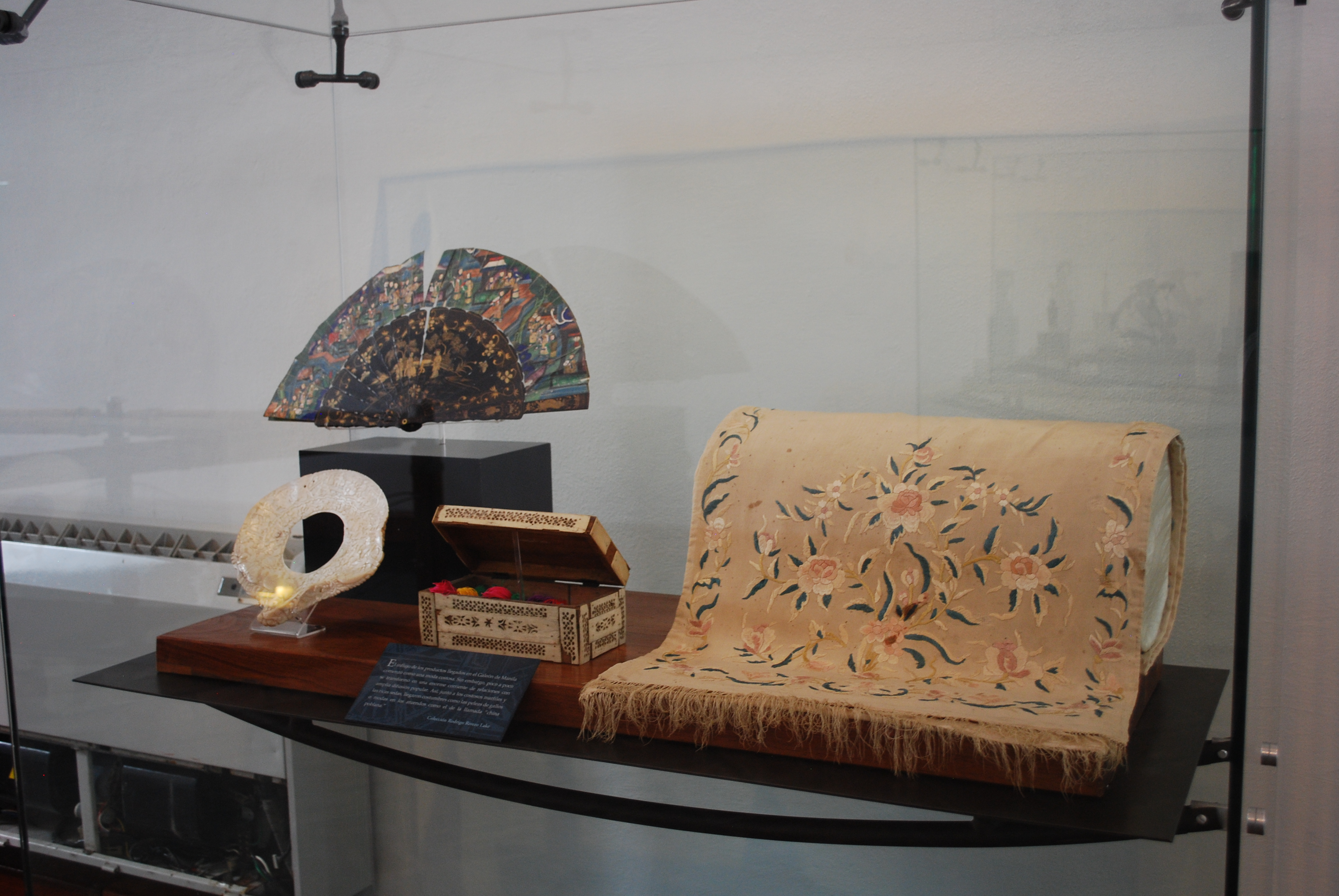
Sample of goods brought via Manila Galleon in Acapulco

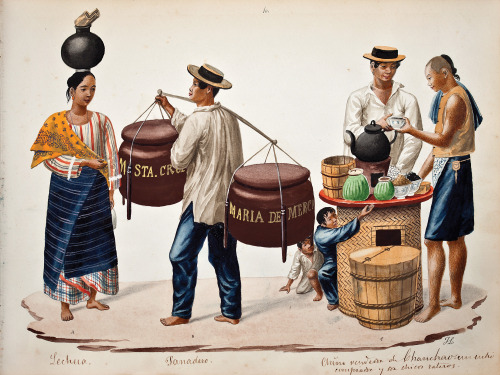
A Scene of Economic Life in Spanish Colonial Philippines (Tipos del País Watercolor by José Honorato Lozano)

The archipelago at the time of the first Spanish contact in 1521 had politically diverse administrations featuring warfare (as in the account of the career of Lapulapu), piracy and slavery. The incoming Spaniards altered and disrupted local practices.

Miguel Lopez de Legazpi, accompanied by Spaniards, Criollos, Mestizos and Indios (Tlaxcaltecs), arrived from Mexico in 1565; he and his successors conquered and unified the islands. The ongoing conquest was possible as a result of the 1565 discovery of a route back to the Mexican coast by the Augustinian friar Andrés de Urdaneta.

The administration of the Philippine islands (Spanish: Islas Filipinas) was carried out from the 1570s to the early-19th century through the Captaincy General of the Philippines (Spanish: Capitanía general de Filipinas) subject to the Viceroyalty of New Spain based in Mexico City. The economy of Spain's Philippine outposts flourished after the Spanish government inaugurated the Manila Galleon trade-system between Asia and Mexico. Trading ships, settlers and military reinforcements made voyages once or twice per year across the Pacific Ocean between the ports of Acapulco in Mexico and Manila in the Philippines. Both cities were part of the then-province of New Spain.

This trade made the city of Manila one of the major global cities in the world, improving the growth of the Philippine economy in the succeeding years. Trade introduced foodstuffs such as maize, tomatoes, potatoes, chili peppers, chocolate and pineapples from Mexico and Peru. Tobacco, first domesticated in Latin-America, and then introduced to the Philippines, became an important cash-crop for Filipinos. The Philippines also became the distribution center of silver mined in the Americas, which was in high demand in Asia during the period. In this silver-based system, the Philippines very much functioned as a trade entrepôt between the nations of South, East and Southeast Asia and the territories in Spanish North and South America. Silks, porcelain, paper, and various manufactured goods came from China. Spices, aromatics, specialty woods, herbs, medicines, pearls, and cinnamon originated in the East Indies (in present-day Indonesia and Malaysia). Finally, Manila imported slaves, jewelry, cotton clothes, iron, and gunpowder from India. These wares, once imported into the Philippines, were re-exported to Mexico or to Peru. The situation caused a trade imbalance, as often the imports outweighed the ratio of exports. When the Spanish restricted the Asian trade via the Philippines to Mexico alone, trade with Peru and other Spanish territories nevertheless continued illegally and in secret. The illegal nature of Philippine trade with the Spanish-American Viceroyalties (with the exception of New Spain, aka. Mexico) made Filipinos tacit participants in the anti-colonial Latin American Wars of Independence where Filipinos living abroad, greatly contributed in the independence wars of several American nations.

The Manila Galleon system operated until 1815, when Mexico achieved its independence. Nevertheless, it did not affect the islands' economy.

On March 10, 1785, King Charles III of Spain confirmed the establishment of the Royal Philippine Company with a 25-year charter. The Basque-based company was granted a monopoly on the importation of Chinese and Indian goods into the Philippines, as well as on the shipping of the goods directly to Spain via the Cape of Good Hope.

=== Spanish East Indies (1815–1898) ===
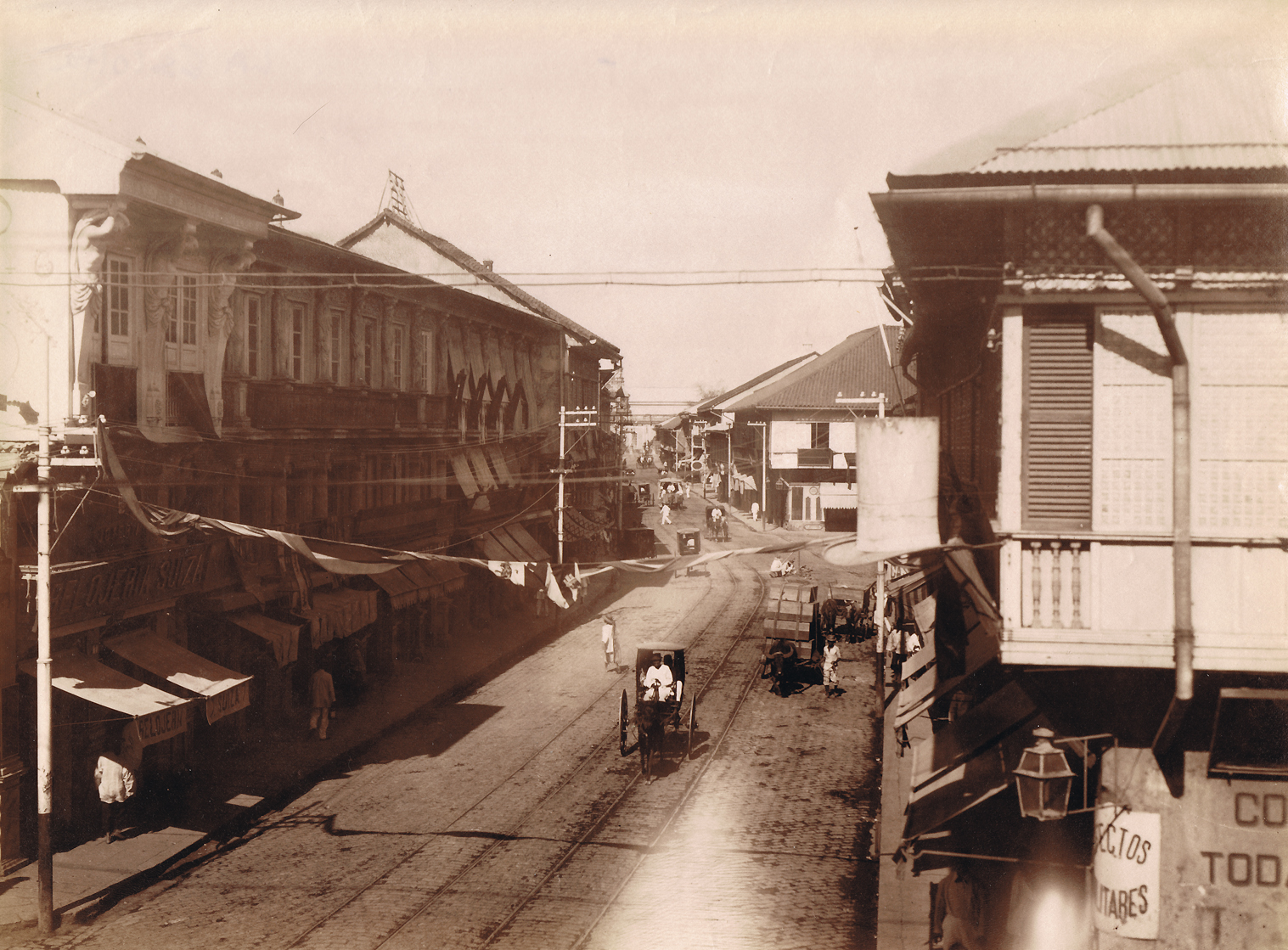
Calle Escolta, the economic center of 19th-century Manila

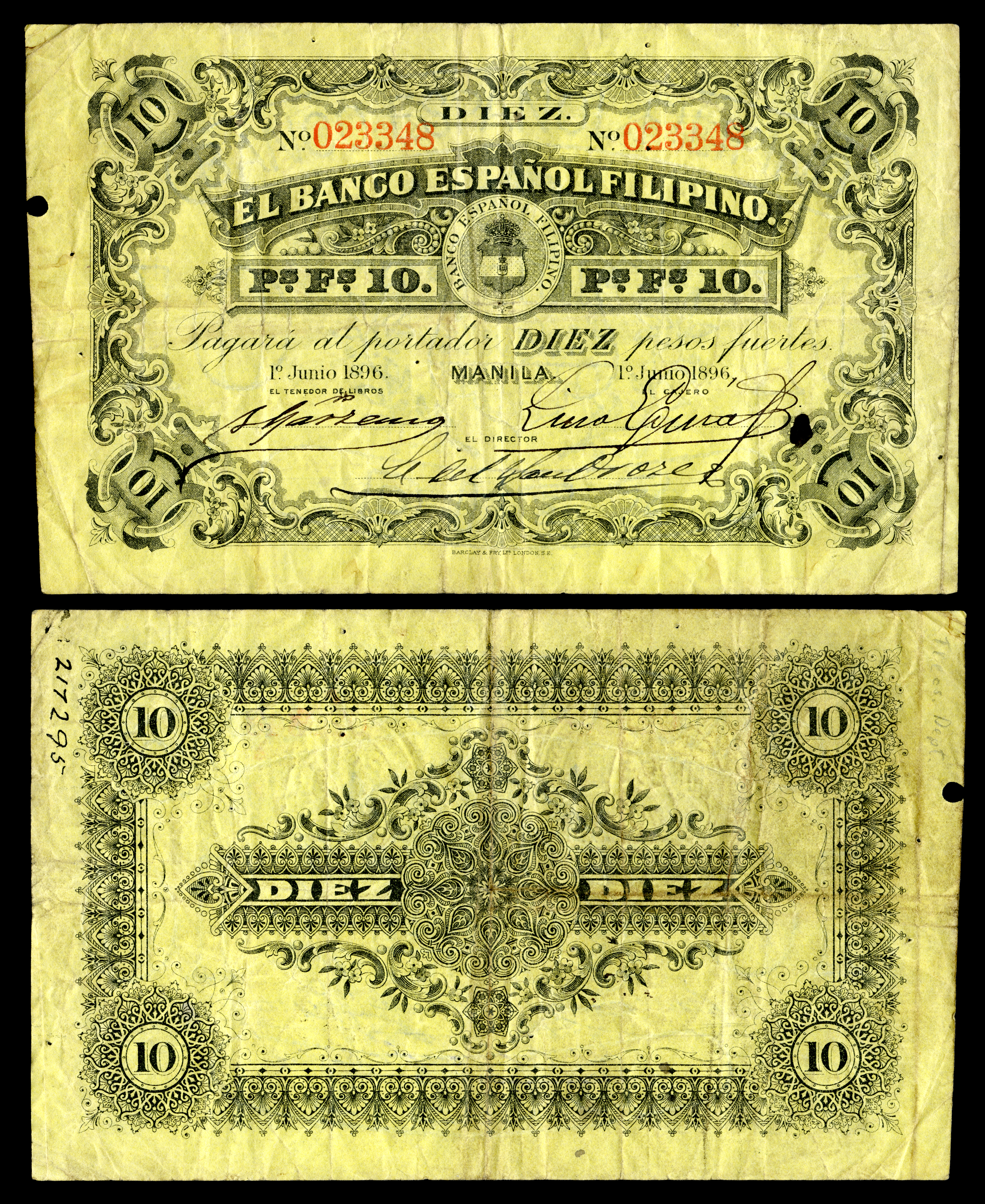
El Banco Español-Filipino, 10 pesos bank note (1896)

After Spain lost Mexico as a territory, New Spain was dissolved making the Philippines and other Pacific islands to form the Spanish East Indies. This resulted in the Philippines being governed directly by the King of Spain and the Captaincy General of the Philippines while the Pacific islands of Northern Mariana Islands, Guam, Micronesia and Palau was governed by the Real Audiencia of Manila and was part of the Philippine territorial governance.

It made the economy of the Philippines grow further as people saw the rise of opportunities. Agriculture remained the largest contributor to economy, being the largest producer of coffee in Asia as well as a large produce of tobacco.

In Europe, the Industrial Revolution spread from Great Britain during the period known as the Victorian Age. The industrialization of Europe created great demands for raw materials from the colonies, bringing with it investment and wealth, although this was very unevenly distributed. Governor-General Basco had opened the Philippines to this trade. Previously, the Philippines was seen as a trading post for international trade but in the nineteenth century it was developed both as a source of raw materials and as a market for manufactured goods. The economy of the Philippines rose rapidly and its local industries developed to satisfy the rising demands of an industrializing Europe. A small flow of European immigrants came with the opening of the Suez Canal, which cut the travel time between Europe and the Philippines by half. New ideas about government and society, which the friars and colonial authorities found dangerous, quickly found their way into the Philippines, notably through the Freemasons, who along with others, spread the ideals of the American, French and other revolutions, including Spanish liberalism.

In 1834, the Royal Company of the Philippines was abolished, and free trade was formally recognized. With its excellent harbor, Manila became an open port for Asian, European, Latin American and North American traders. European merchants alongside the Chinese immigrants opened stores selling goods from all parts of the world. The El Banco Español Filipino de Isabel II (now Bank of the Philippine Islands) was the first bank opened in the Philippines in 1851.

In 1873, additional ports were opened to foreign commerce, and by the late nineteenth century three crops—tobacco, abaca, and sugar—dominated Philippine exports.

== First Philippine Republic (1899–1901) ==
The economy of the Philippines during the insurgency of the First Philippine Republic remained the same throughout its early months but was halted due to the break out of the Philippine–American War. Nevertheless, during the era of the First Republic, the estimated GDP per capita of the Philippines in 1900 was $1,033 – the second-highest GDP per capita in all of Asia at the time, slightly behind that of Japan ($1,135) and vastly exceeding that of China ($652) and India ($625). Furthermore, real wages in the Philippines during the First Republic were actually the highest in Asia, eclipsing even Japan's, with the Philippines' real wages averaging 25.06% that of Great Britain's (The Foremost Industrial Power of the Era) while Japan averaged only 21.19%. Former Education secretary Alejandro Roces also noted that the Philippines' literacy rate was even higher than mainland Spain and several European countries.

== American colonial period (1901–1940) ==
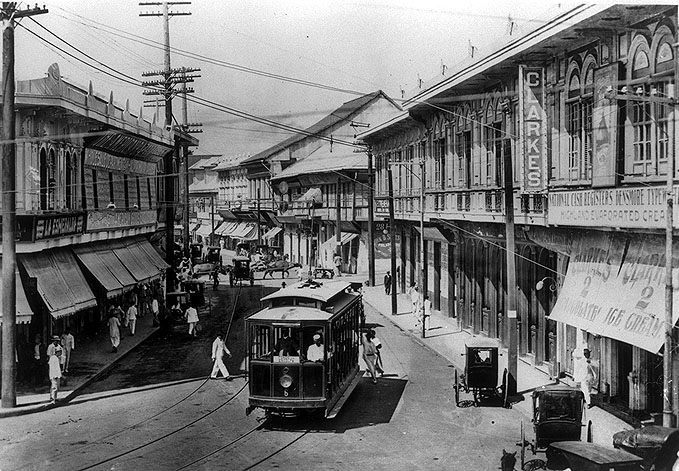
Manila in the 1900s

The results of the economy under the Americans were mixed. An initial phase of high growth occurred during the 1910s due to the recovery from the wars with Spain and the US, and investment in agriculture. The Philippines would at first briefly outpace its neighbors. This would not last as growth fell behind in the later years. In the late 1920s and beyond, the economy stagnated as access to US markets became restricted by protectionist quotas and fiscal restraints forestalled any further development in agriculture.

The growth period can be attributed to the results of a crash program in agricultural modernization undertaken in 1910–1920. This in turn was done in order to address the growing shortfall in the supply of rice. The Philippines once a net exporter became an importer of rice as a result of the wars with the Spanish and later the Americans and by the reallocation of labour to export crops.

The 1930s would mark the end to this period of relative prosperity. The Sugar Act of 1934 capped Philippines sugar exports to the US at 921,000 tons per year. Expenditure on public infrastructure for agriculture was reduced as the Payne–Aldridge Act stripped the government of customs revenue. Manila hemp was now competing against the newly invented Nylon. Although the area of land cultivated for agriculture was still increasing, the rate was reduced to 1% per annum.

The most consequential policy of this period was the peg between the peso and dollar. This was enforced by law until 1975. It provided monetary stability for foreign investment inflows, which lead to 40% of all capital invested in manufacturing and commercial enterprises to be owned by foreign entities by 1938. On the other hand, this overvaluation of the peso would have a negative impact with foreign trade with the rest of Asia. Economic policy leading to independence would have necessitated loosening trade links with the US. In order to achieve an internationally competitive exchange rate, the peso dollar link would have to be broken. The much belated move to a true floating exchange rate led to uncompetitive exports as such an import substitution strategy remained until significant currency devaluation opened up the opportunity for reorienting towards exports.

=== World War II (1941–1945) ===
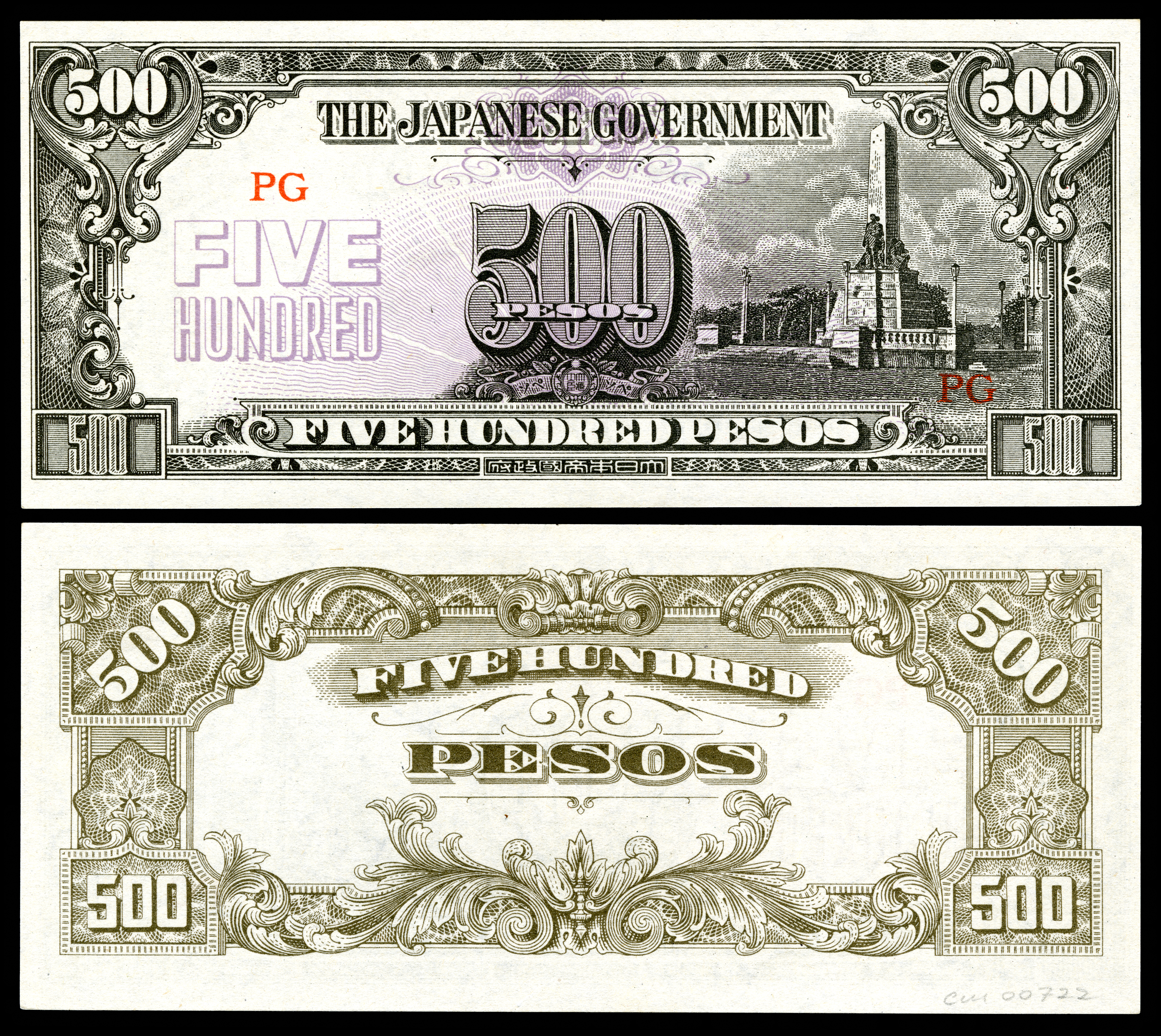
Japanese invasion money – Philippines 500 pesos

Due to the Japanese invasion establishing the unofficial Second Philippine Republic, the economic growth receded and food shortages occurred. Prioritizing the shortages of food, Jose Laurel, the appointed president, organized an agency to distribute rice, even though most of the rice was confiscated by Japanese soldiers. Manila was one of the many places in the country that suffered from severe shortages, due mainly to a typhoon that struck the country in November 1943. The people were forced to cultivate private plots which produced root crops like kangkong. The Japanese, in order to raise rice production in the country, brought a quick-maturing horai rice, which was first used in Taiwan. Horai rice was expected to make the Philippines self-sufficient in rice by 1943, but rains during 1942 prevented this.

Also during World War II in the Philippines, the occupying Japanese government issued fiat currency in several denominations; this is known as the Japanese government-issued Philippine fiat peso.

The first issue in 1942 consisted of denominations of 1, 5, 10 and 50 centavos and 1, 5, and 10 Pesos. The next year brought "replacement notes" of the 1, 5 and 10 Pesos while 1944 ushered in a 100 Peso note and soon after an inflationary 500 Pesos note. In 1945, the Japanese issued a 1,000 Pesos note. This set of new money, which was printed even before the war, became known in the Philippines as Mickey Mouse money due to its very low value caused by severe inflation. Anti-Japanese newspapers portrayed stories of going to the market laden with suitcases or "bayong" (native bags made of woven coconut or buri leaf strips) overflowing with the Japanese-issued bills. In 1944, a box of matches cost more than 100 Mickey Mouse pesos. In 1945, a kilogram of camote cost around 1000 Mickey Mouse pesos. Inflation plagued the country with the devaluation of the Japanese money, evidenced by a 60% inflation experienced in January 1944.

=== Cold War (1947–1991) ===
During the Cold War between the Capitalist United States and Communist Soviet Union, in Asia, despite being devastated by World War 2, defending US interests, and being a former colony, the Philippines received negligible financial assistance from the United States with only 5 billion US dollars' worth of aid in totality since Independence compared to the copious amount of free development aid given to other Asian allies like: Israel ($317.9 Billion US Dollars in free aid), South Korea ($119.9 Billion US dollars in free aid) South Vietnam ($104 Billion Dollars in free aid), Taiwan, ($41.81015 Billion US Dollars in free aid by year 1975 which convert to $242 Billion Dollars in 2024 values as adjusted for inflation) and Japan, as the United States considered their economic development more important than that of the Philippines because they had hostile Pro-Soviet Union neighbors which the United States opposed. Furthermore, America applied a deindustrialization policy and supported Free Market reforms in the Philippines, assigning it a role of only "supplying raw materials" while being open to foreign imports, because Japan was designated to be the main industrial export power in Asia, thus retarding Industrialization efforts in the Philippines while the other nations that were protectionist and had Industrial Policy surged ahead in development.

According to the Book: "The Anti-Development State: The Political Economy of Permanent Crisis in the Philippines - by Economists; Walden Bello, with Herbert Docena, Marissa de Guzman and Marylou Malig", according to them, the "unfair" treatment of the United States; by actively investing in its own former enemies: Japan, and its colonies; Taiwan and South Korea, since they were threatened by Communist Russia and China, and the United States wanted them as rich "Showcase Countries" to be a good examples against Communism, and also allowing: Japan, South Korea, and Taiwan, to have an Activist State-Led Capitalism which was also protectionist, made them grow rich. Whereas the United States "hypocritically" applied the reverse policy in the Philippines its own former colony and steadfast friend, since the American led World Trade Organization forced the reverse of the policies it did for East Asia, in supporting the privatization of National Companies in the Philippines and mass adoption of unrestricted open-trade killing local companies and industries, and adopt the reverse of protectionism, which was trade-liberalization, as well as imposing the Bell Trade Act giving Americans equal rights to Filipino citizens to exploiting local resources in exchange for World War 2 repair money, allowing for massive capital flight away from the Philippines to the United States, which they didn't even apply to American occupied Japan.

=== Third Philippine Republic (1946–1965) ===
After the re-establishment of the Commonwealth in 1945, the country was left with a devastated city, food crisis and financial crisis. One year later, in 1946, the Philippines became independent from the US, creating the Third Philippine Republic.

In an effort to solve the massive socio-economic problems of the period, newly elected President Manuel Roxas reorganized the government, and proposed a wide-sweeping legislative program. Among the undertakings of the Third Republic's initial year were: The establishment of the Rehabilitation Finance Corporation (which would be reorganized in 1958 as the Development Bank of the Philippines); the creation of the Department of Foreign Affairs and the organization of the foreign service through Executive Order No. 18; the GI Bill of Rights for Filipino veterans; and the revision of taxation laws to increase government revenues.

Filemon C. Rodriguez, one of the leading economic planner of the post-war Philippines, had warned that first, it is best to utilize this time to improve our economic position before in any eventuality, Japan could regain its footing and become a force once again, and second, should the Philippines miss this golden opportunity, we would still be at the mercy of our neighboring countries and experience all the drawbacks of a weak nation.

President Roxas moved to strengthen sovereignty by proposing a Central Bank for the Philippines to administer the Philippine banking system which was established by Republic Act No. 265.

In leading a "cash-starved government" that needed to attend a battered nation, President Roxas campaigned for the parity amendment to the 1935 Constitution. This amendment, demanded by the Philippine Trade Relations Act or the Bell Trade Act, would give American citizens and industries the right to utilize the country's natural resources in return for rehabilitation support from the United States. The President, with the approval of Congress, proposed this move to the nation through a plebiscite.

The Roxas administration also pioneered the foreign policy of the Republic. Vice President Elpidio Quirino was appointed Secretary of Foreign Affairs. General Carlos P. Romulo, as permanent representative of the Philippines to the United Nations, helped shape the country's international identity in the newly established stage for international diplomacy and relations. During the Roxas administration, the Philippines established diplomatic ties with foreign countries and gained membership to international entities, such as the United Nations General Assembly, the United Nations Educational, Scientific and Cultural Organization (UNESCO), the World Health Organization (WHO), the International Labor Organization (ILO), etc.

When President Carlos P. Garcia won the elections, his administration promoted the "Filipino First" policy, whose focal point was to regain economic independence; a national effort by Filipinos to "obtain major and dominant participation in their economy." The administration campaigned for the citizens' support in patronizing Filipino products and services, and implemented import and currency controls favorable for Filipino industries. In connection with the government's goal of self-sufficiency was the "Austerity Program," which President Garcia described in his first State of the NatIon Address as "more work, more thrift, more productive investment, and more efficiency" that aimed to mobilize national savings. The Anti Graft and Corrupt Practices Act, through Republic Act No. 301, aimed to prevent corruption, and promote honesty and public trust. Another achievement of the Garcia administration was the Bohlen–Serrano Agreement of 1959, which shortened the term of lease of the US military bases in the country from the previous 99 to 25 years.

President Diosdado Macapagal, during his inaugural address on December 30, 1961, emphasized the responsibilities and goals to be attained in the "new era" that was the Macapagal administration. He reiterated his resolve to eradicate corruption, and assured the public that honesty would prevail in his presidency. President Macapagal, too, aimed at self-sufficiency and the promotion of every citizen's welfare, through the partnership of the government and private sector, and to alleviate poverty by providing solutions for unemployment.

Among the laws passed during the Macapagal administration were: Republic Act No. 3844 or the Agricultural Land Reform Code (an act that established the Land Bank of the Philippines); Republic Act No. 3466, which established the Emergency Employment Administration; Republic Act No. 3518, which established the Philippine Veterans Bank; Republic Act No. 3470, which established the National Cottage Industries Development Authority (NACIDA) to organize, revive, and promote the establishment of local cottage industries; and Republic Act No. 4156, which established the Philippine National Railways (PNR) to operate the national railroad and tramways. The administration lifted foreign exchange controls as part of the decontrol program in an attempt to promote national economic stability and growth.

== Marcos era (1965–1986) ==
=== First two terms of Ferdinand Marcos ===
Upon being elected to his first four-year term in the mid-1960s, Ferdinand Marcos began political efforts to become the first Philippine president to be elected to a second term, launching a program of rapid modernization to back up his 1969 campaign theme, "performance." The government's spending deficit in the first Marcos administration from 1965 to 1969 was 70% higher than that of the Macapagal administration from 1961 to 1965. In order to do this, Marcos relied heavily on foreign loans, and economists would later point to the period of fiscal policy from 1966 to 1970 as the root of problems that would bring about problems of the Philippine economy in the late 1970s, the 1980s, and beyond.

Most of Marcos' first term continued the economic trends established by the Garcia and Macapagal administrations. The Asian Development Bank became headquartered in the Philippines in the 1970s. But the end of that first term in 1969 was marked by the 1969 Philippine balance of payments crisis which was the result of heavy government spending linked to Marcos' campaign for his second presidential term. As a result, economic policy began to reflect the preferences of the International Monetary Fund and the World Bank.

The Balance of Payments crisis triggered broad social unrest. The first three months of 1970s were marked by protests from different sectors, most notably students, which eventually became known as the First Quarter Storm. This included "moderate" groups which called for political and economic reforms within the existing system, and "radical" groups which included communist and socialist groups which called for broad structural changes. Protests during the First Quarter storm and in the two succeeding years sometimes became violent, as was the case of the January 30 Storming of Malacañang Palace, and the Diliman Commune incident of February the following year. Marcos blamed this social unrest on the still-new Communist Party of the Philippines, which had just been established the year before. This period was also marked by a series of bombings, beginning with the Plaza Miranda bombing and continuing for a year as the 1972 Manila bombings, whose perpetrators remain the subject of debate to this day.

With the end of Marcos' last constitutionally-allowed term approaching, opposition senators exposed the existence of "Oplan Sagittarius," a plan to declare martial law and extend Marcos's stay in office. He did so a week later, issuing Proclamation No. 1081, a declaration that suspended civil rights and imposed military rule in the country.

=== Martial law and Fourth Republic era ===
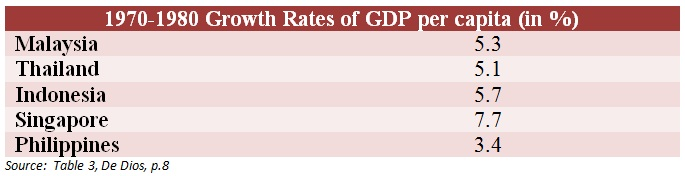
1970–1980 Growth Rates of GDP per capita (in%)

After experiencing years of positive growth, the Philippine economy between 1973 and 1986 suffered a downturn due to a mixture of economic mismanagement and political instability amidst a global economic recession. After the 1972 Martial Law declaration, Marcos continued his strategy of relying on international loans to fund the projects that would support the booming economy, prompting later economists to label this a period of "debt driven" growth. Massive lending from commercial banks, accounting for about 62% percent of external debt, allowed the GDP of the Philippines to rise during martial law. Much of the money was spent on pump-priming to improve infrastructure and promote tourism. However, despite the aggressive borrowing and spending policies, the Philippines lagged behind its Southeast Asia counterparts in GDP growth rate per capita. The country, in 1970–1980, only registered an average 5.73 percent growth, while its counterparts like Thailand, Malaysia, Singapore, and Indonesia garnered a mean growth of 7.97 percent. This lag, which became very apparent at the end of the Marcos Regime, can be attributed to the failures of economic management that was brought upon by State-run monopolies, mismanaged exchange rates, imprudent monetary policy and debt management, all underpinned by rampant corruption and cronyism.

Economist Emmanuel de Dios noted that the “[…]main characteristics distinguishing the Marcos years from other periods of our history has been the trend towards the concentration of power in the hands of the government, and the use of governmental functions to dispense economic privileges to some small factions in the private sector.”

Government efforts to pump-prime the economy to increase income and encourage spending, unemployment and underemployment grew. The unemployment rate decreased from 5.2 to 0.9 percent from 1978 to 1983, while employment was a problem, the latter tripling, in the same time period, from 10.2 to 29.0 percent. Concurrently, the labor force of the Philippines grew at an average 10.47 percent in 1970–1983. This can be attributed to an increasing number of women seeking work in the market.

Income inequality grew during the era of martial law, as the poorest 60 percent of the nation were able to contribute only 22.5 percent of the income in 1980, down from 25.0 percent in 1970. The richest 10 percent, meanwhile, took a larger share of the income at 41.7 percent in 1980, up from 37.1 percent in 1970.

According to the FIES (Family Income and Expenditure Survey) conducted from 1965 to 1985, poverty incidence in the Philippines rose from 41 percent in 1965 to 58.9 percent in 1985. This can be attributed to lower real agricultural wages and lesser real wages for unskilled and skilled laborers. Real agricultural wages fell about 25 percent from their 1962 level, while real wages for unskilled and skilled laborers decreased by about one-third of their 1962 level. It was observed that higher labor force participation and higher incomes of the rich helped cushion the blow of the mentioned problems.

Crony capitalism by various associates of both Ferdinand and Imelda Marcos, historically referred to using the catchphrase "Marcos cronies", led to the creation of Monopolies in numerous key industries, including sugar, coconut, logging, tobacco, bananas, telecommunications, broadcast media, and electricity, among others.

There are few more palpable and glaring examples of the economic mismanagement of the time than the Bataan Nuclear Power Plant (BNPP) located in Morong, Bataan. Started in the 1970s, the BNPP was supposed to boost the country's competitiveness by providing affordable electricity to fuel industrialization and job creation in the country. Far from this, the US$2.3 billion nuclear plant suffered from cost over-runs and engineering and structural issues which eventually led to its mothballing—without generating a single watt of electricity.

=== Main development strategies ===
In the two decades of Marcos's rule, Philippine economic development strategy had three central pillars: the Green Revolution, Export Agriculture and forestry, and foreign borrowing. The main laws governing the economy and trade in the 1970s were the Investment Incentives Act and Export Incentives Act of 1970, authored by Sen. Jose W. Diokno.

==== The green revolution ====
In 1973, the martial law regime merged all coconut-related, government operations within a single agency, the Philippine Coconut Authority (PCA). The PCA was empowered to collect a levy of P0.55 per 100 kilograms on the sale of copra to be used to stabilize the domestic price of coconut-based consumer goods, particularly cooking oil. In 1974, the government created the Coconut Industry Development Fund (CIDF) to finance the development of a hybrid coconut tree. To finance the project, the levy was increased to P20.[5]

Also in 1974, coconut planters, led by the Coconut Producers Federation (Cocofed), an organization of large planters, took control of the PCA governing board. In 1975 the PCA acquired a bank, renamed the United Coconut Planters Bank, to service the needs of coconut farmers, and the PCA director, Eduardo Cojuangco, a business associate of Marcos, became its president. Levies collected by the PCA were placed in the bank, initially interest-free.[5]

The architects of this technology had one overriding objective: increased food production. Proponents of the strategy expected, however, that the new rice technology would also have a positive distributional impact on the poor. Three major benefits were taken to be virtually self-evident:

1. Increased rice output would, ceteris paribus, lower the price of rice.

Since the poor spend a larger fraction of their income on food than the rich do, the idea is that they would benefit excessively.

2. Poor farmers would share in the gains to rice producers.

The new technology was labor intensive. This would be a special advantage to smaller growers who have lower labor costs.

3. Landless agricultural workers would benefit too.

Thanks to the increased demand for labor and the resulting increased employment and higher wages.

New rice technology
Three essential elements

The following key factors of the new rice technology were interdependent. That is, if one was absent, the productivity of the others was greatly reduced.

1. 'High-yielding' or 'modern' rice varieties originated at the IRRI
2. Chemical fertilizers, to which these varieties are highly responsive
3. Water control, notably irrigation in the Philippine setting

Among these, water control remains a key constraint in Philippine rice agriculture.

The green revolution brought temporary relief from this impasse, allowing the country to achieve substantial rice yield increases via the shift to new seed-fertilizer technology. But constraints in irrigation did not permit the new varieties to attain their full potential yields, nor did it permit much increase in multiple cropping.

Green revolution overall effect

In the early 1990s, the average coconut farm was a medium-sized unit of less than four hectares. Owners, often absentee, customarily employed local peasants to collect coconuts rather than engage in tenancy relationships. The villagers were paid on a piece-rate basis. Those employed in the coconut industry tended to be less educated and older than the average person in the rural labor force and earned lower-than-average incomes.[5]

Despite the positive impact of lower prices on poor consumers, absolute poverty increased. "Cheaper rice mitigated, but did not reverse the trend towards impoverishment".

==== Export agriculture and forestry ====
The year 1962 was a good one for Philippine export agriculture. Devaluation and deregulation of foreign exchange brought windfall profits to agro-exporters, and were widely seen as a "political triumph" for its main traditional exports.

In 1978 the United Coconut Planters Bank was given legal authority to purchase coconut mills, ostensibly as a measure to cope with excess capacity in the industry. At the same time, mills not owned by coconut farmers—that is, Cocofed members or entities it controlled through the PCA—were denied subsidy payments to compensate for the price controls on coconut-based consumer products. By early 1980, it was reported in the Philippine press that the United Coconut Oil Mills, a PCA-owned firm, and its president, Cojuangco, controlled 80 percent of the Philippine oil-milling capacity.[5] Minister of Defense Juan Ponce Enrile also exercised strong influence over the industry as chairman of both the United Coconut Planters Bank and United Coconut Oil Mills and honorary chairman of Cocofed. An industry composed of some 500,000 farmers and 14,000 traders was, by the early 1980s, highly monopolized.[5]

In principle, the coconut farmers were to be the beneficiaries of the levy, which between March 1977 and September 1981 stabilized at P76 per 100 kilograms. Contingent benefits included life insurance, educational scholarships, and a cooking oil subsidy, but few actually benefited. The aim of the replanting program, controlled by Cojuangco, was to replace aging coconut trees with a hybrid of a Malaysian dwarf and West African tall varieties. The new palms were to produce five times the weight per year of existing trees. The target of replanting 60,000 trees a year was not met.[5] In 1983, 25 to 30 percent of coconut trees were estimated to be at least 60 years old; by 1988, the proportion had increased to between 35 and 40 percent.[5]

When coconut prices began to fall in the early 1980s, pressure mounted to alter the structure of the industry. In 1985, the Philippine government agreed to dismantle the United Coconut Oil Mills as part of an agreement with the IMF to bail out the Philippine economy. Later in 1988, United States law requiring foods using tropical oils to be labeled indicating the saturated fat content had a negative impact on an already ailing industry and gave rise to protests from coconut growers that similar requirements were not levied on oils produced in temperate climates.[5] Philippine earnings, nevertheless, did not rise equally owing to worsening terms of trade. The country experienced severely declining terms of trade and great price instability for its agricultural exports from 1962 to 1985. These price movements were "the result of external political and economic forces over which the Philippines could exercise little control". Thus relying on export agriculture as an "engine of economic growth" proved unfeasible.

Export agriculture and forestry overall effect

The effects of this special treatment of favorites soon became apparent. Their products were of poor quality and were poor value of money. The traditional economic mainstay of the Philippine ruling elite has been export agriculture. Development strategy in the Marcos era continued to rely on this sector as a major source of income and foreign exchange, between 1962 and 1985, export crop acreage more than doubled. Earnings did not rise commensurately, however, owing to worsening terms of trade.

==== Foreign borrowing: The debt-for-development strategy ====
Foreign borrowing was a key element in Philippine development strategy during the Marcos era. The primary rationale was that "borrowed money would speed the growth of the Philippine economy, improving the well-being of present and future generations of Filipinos".

Debt-driven growth, 1970–1983

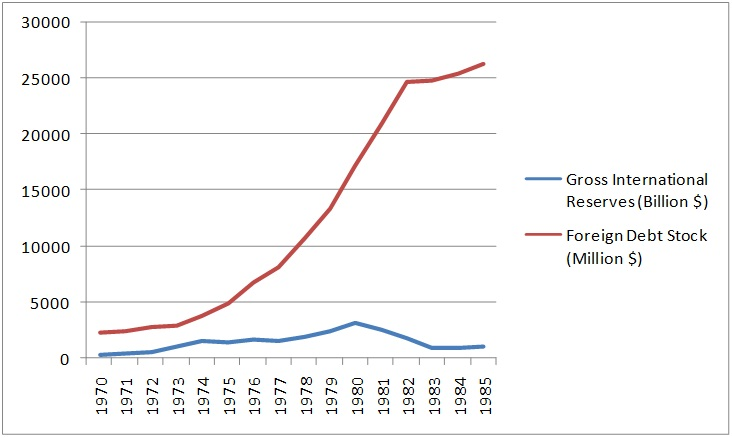
Gross International Reserves and Foreign Debt Stock (1970–1985)

The Marcos regime cornered an increasing share of the profits from the traditional export crops, sugar cane and coconut. The result was a redistribution of income from agro-export elites as a whole to a politically well-connected subset of that elite. In declaring martial law, Marcos promised to save the country from "an oligarchy that appropriated for itself all power and bounty". But while he did indeed tame selected oligarchs most threatening to his regime, he simply replaced them with a new oligarchy of Marcos and his relatives and cronies which achieved dominance within many economic sectors. While foreign loans sustained decrease in the 1970s, crony abuses brought economic disaster in the early 1980s (de Dios, 1984). Most fundamentally, the implementation of martial law perpetuated important shortcomings of Philippine capitalism, because Marcos was merely expanding earlier patterns of patrimonial plunder. Particularistic demands continued to prevail, the difference being that one ruler now appropriated a much larger proportion of the state apparatus toward the service of his own private end. As the economic crisis intensified – especially after the 1983 assassination of opposition leader Benigno S. Aquino – the IMF transformed itself from "doting parent" to "vengeful god" and forced a wrenching process of economic stabilization that induced severe recession. This heightened the regime's unpopularity, assisted the continuing growth of both leftist and moderate resistance throughout the archipelago, and paved away for the Marcos regime's demise amid the People Power uprising of February 1986. More thoroughgoing attempts at reform awaited the advent of a new democratic era.

Marcos increased the stature of technocrats within the government and, through their public rhetoric in favor of policy reform, help to ensure the continued flow of loans into the country. Over time, however, became increasingly clear that technocracy would have to give way to an acquisitive and more influential diversified family conglomerates. Marcos and his cronies used access to the political machinery to accumulate wealth, and – like the major families of the pre-martial law years – had little loyalty to the nation. The cronyism of the Marcos regime was more obvious than the cronyism of either the pre-1972 period or the post-1986 years, since the regime had more centralized control over the state apparatus and enjoyed much longer tenure in office.

Oligarchic plunder was manifest in the crony capitalists that controlled the industries during the dictatorial regime. Crony capitalists "were businessmen who walk the corridors of the presidency and by virtue of this proximity to Marcos drove policy making and by doing so were able to control specific sectors of the economy".

Battle for stabilization, 1983–1986

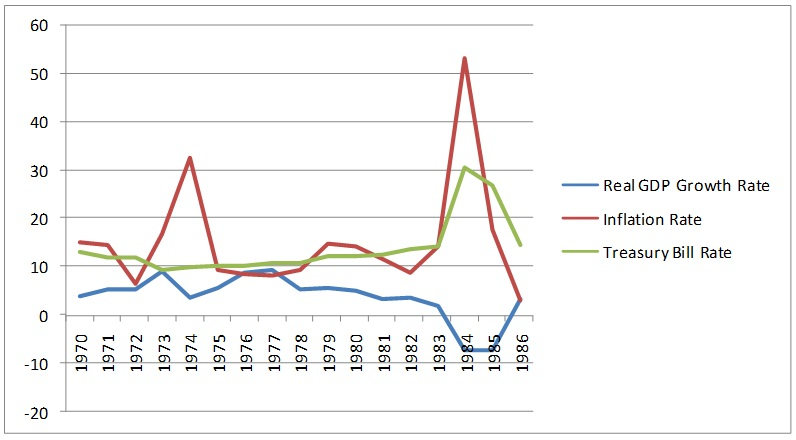
Real GDP Growth Rate, Inflation Rate, and Treasury Bill Rate (1970–1986)

After the assassination of Benigno Aquino, the Philippines plunged into economic freefall.

Due to the sudden collapse of confidence and credit ratings from international financial institutions, the Philippine government, had difficulty borrowing new capital to cut the increasing budget deficit, much of it payments to interest from debt. The government was thus forced to declare a debt moratorium and started to impose import controls and implemented foreign exchange rationing, which temporarily halted its import liberalization program. The peso was again devalued in 1984 by almost 100 percent. The Central Bank was later forced to start a new program, issuing “Central bank bills ... at more than 50 percent interest rate – which most likely contributed to the high inflation in 1984 and 1985.” This was aimed at attracting inflows of foreign currency due to the higher domestic interest rate and to lower deficit and aggregate demand. This resulted in a reduction in the balance of payments and national account deficits but at the same time also started an economic decline of about 7 percent in the years 1984 to 1985. Investments also fell by about 50 percent in 1985 due to lower economic growth. According to Lim, the government also employed measures to reduce overall government expenditures to reduce deficits. This effort, however, was partially caused by the fall in tax revenues during that time as public speculation about the weaknesses of the government was increasing. However, because of the large deficit incurred by the Central Bank due to bailouts and assumption of debts from bankrupt firms, this measure had relatively no effect on the overall deficit that the government had by the end of 1986.

Between 1962 and 1986, the external debt of the Philippine grew from $355 million to $28.3 billion. By the end of the Marcos years, the Philippines was the "ninth most indebted nation in Asia, Africa, and Latin America in absolute terms".

=== Other development policies ===
The Marcos regime, during the early to mid-'70s, focused primarily on improving the economy and the country's public image through major increases in government spending particularly on infrastructures. Its main beneficiaries were the tourism industry, with numerous constructions, such as the Philippine International Convention Center, hotels, and even the hosting of international events like the Miss Universe and IMF forums to be able to improve the international status of the county. This policy generally continued even through the 1980s, when the world was experiencing stagflation, an international debt crisis, and high increases of interest rates.

The early effects of the increase in government spending were generally positive. Private businesses and firms, seeing this action by the government, felt bullish and also engaged in aggressive investment and spending patterns. Initially, the gross domestic capital formation to GDP rose up to 28% and foreign investments to the country also increased.

The government, in the 1970s, also focused on an "Export-led Industrialization Program" which focused on "non-traditional manufactured exports and foreign investments". This led to an increase of foreign direct investment in the country particularly to manufacture export-oriented goods. This program also allowed the government to be able to "shift the composition of exports toward a more balanced mix between non-traditional manufactures and primary/agricultural exports".

With this growth in the export sector, there also accompanied growth in the import sector particularly since imported raw materials (also known as intermediate imports) were sourced for domestically produced goods. This led to the worsening deficit at that time, especially by the end of the decade, accompanied by the second oil price shock.

== Post-EDSA macroeconomics ==
The period from 1986 following the EDSA Revolution of 1986 to the present time saw the Philippine economy get back on track. Reforms aided the country towards robust growth, and crucial policies were conceptualized, developed, and enacted by the presidents and the advisers who supported them. The period also featured the emergence of civil society as important proponents of development, trade reforms and protections, improvements in exports and export-oriented manufacturing, and decentralization as an important take-off point for regional development.

Year	Growth %	Year	Growth %	Year	Growth %	Year	Growth %	Year	Growth %
1986	3.42	1991	−0.58	1996	5.85	2001	1.76	2006	5.34
1987	4.31	1992	0.34	1997	5.19	2002	4.45	2007	7.08
1988	6.75	1993	2.12	1998	−0.58	2003	4.93	2008	3.84
1989	6.21	1994	4.39	1999	3.40	2004	6.38	2009	0.92
1990	3.04	1995	4.68	2000	5.97	2005	4.95	2010	7.30

Table 1: GDP Growth Rates from 1986 to 2010

- data derived from GDP figures in the Philippine Statistical Yearbook
- growth for 2010 courtesy of Manila Bulletin (Lopez and Leyco)

=== Fifth Philippine Republic (1986–present) ===
==== C. Aquino administration (1986–1992) ====
The Corazon Aquino administration took over an economy that had gone through socio-political disasters during the People Power revolution, where there was financial and commodity collapse caused by an overall consumer cynicism. At that point in time, the country's incurred debt from the Marcos Era's debt-driven development began crippling the country.

Most of the immediate efforts of the Aquino administration was directed in reforming the image of the country and paying off all debts as possible. This resulted in budget cuts and further aggravated the plight of the lower class. Infrastructure projects, including repairs, were halted in secluded provinces turning concrete roads into asphalt. Privatization of many government corporations was the priority of the Aquino administration which led to massive lay-offs and inflation. The Aquino administration was persistent in its belief that the problems that arose from the removal of the previous administration can be solved by the decentralization of power.

Growth gradually began in the next few years of the administration. There was a short-lived, patchy, and erratic recovery from 1987 to 1991 as the political situation stabilized a bit. With this, the peso became more competitive, confidence of investors was gradually regained, positive movements in terms of trade were realized, and regional growth gradually strengthened.

==== Ramos administration (1992–1998) ====
The Ramos administration basically served its role as the carrier of the momentum of reform and as an important vehicle in "hastening the pace of liberalization and openness in the country". The administration was a proponent of capital account liberalization, which made the country more open to foreign trade, investments, and relations. It was during the term of the administration when the Bangko Sentral ng Pilipinas was established, and the Philippines joined the World Trade Organization and other free trade associations such as the APEC. Also, debt reduction was considered and as such, the issuance of certain government bonds called Brady Bonds also came to fruition in 1992.

By the time Ramos succeeded Corazon Aquino in 1992, the Philippine economy was already burdened with a heavy budget deficit. This was largely the result of austerity measures imposed by a standard credit arrangement with the International Monetary Fund and the destruction caused by natural disasters such as the eruption of Mt. Pinatubo. Hence, pump priming through government spending was immediately ruled out due to the deficit. Ramos therefore resorted to institutional changes through structural policy reforms, of which included privatization and deregulation. He sanctioned the formation of the Legislative-Executive Development Advisory Council (LEDAC), which served as a forum for consensus building, on the part of the Executive and the Legislative branches, on important bills on economic policy reform measures.

The daily brownouts that plagued the economy were also addressed through the enactment of policies that placed guaranteed rates. The economy during the first year of Ramos administration suffered from severe power shortage, with frequent brownouts, each lasting from 8 to 12 hours. To resolve this problem, the Electric Power Crisis Act was made into law together with the Build-Operate-Transfer Law. Twenty power plants were built because of these, and in effect, the administration was able to eliminate the power shortage problems in December 1993 and sustained economic growth for some time.

The economy seemed to be all set for long-run growth, as shown by promising growth rates from 1994 to 1997. However, the 1997 Asian financial crisis that started from Thailand and Korea started affecting the Philippines. This prompted the Philippine economy to plunge into continuous devaluation and very risky ventures, resulting in property busts and a negative growth rate. The administration was able to withstand the Asian Crisis better than other neighboring countries.

Some of the most important policies and breakthroughs of the administration are the liberalization of capital accounts and the subsequent commitments to free trade associations such as APEC, AFTA, GATT, and WTO. The liberalization and opening of the capital opening culminated in full-peso convertibility in 1992. Another breakthrough was the reduction of debts in that the debts of the old central bank were taken off its books.

==== Estrada administration (1998–2001) ====
Cronyism during Estrada's administration and other big issues caused the country's image of economic stability to change towards the worse. Targeted revenues were not reached, implementation of policies became very slow, and fiscal adjustments were not efficiently conceptualized and implemented; these numerous mistakes were made worse by the Jueteng controversy, which gave rise to the succeeding EDSA Revolutions.

Despite all these controversies, the administration still had some meaningful and profound policies to applaud. The administration presents a reprise of the population policy, which involved the assisting of married couples to achieve their fertility goals, reduce unwanted fertility and match their unmet need for contraception. The administration also pushed for budget appropriations for family planning and contraceptives, an effort that was eventually stopped because the church condemned it. The administration was also able to implement a piece of its overall Poverty Alleviation Plan, which involved the delivery of social services, basic needs, and assistance to the poor families. The administration also had limited contributions to Agrarian Reform, establishing the program "Sustainable Agrarian Reform Communities-Technical Support to Agrarian and Rural Development". As for regional development, however, the administration had no notable contributions or breakthroughs.

==== Macapagal-Arroyo administration (2001–2010) ====
The Arroyo administration, in an economical standpoint, was a period of good growth rates, due perhaps to the emergence of the Overseas Filipino workers (OFW) and the Business Process Outsourcing (BPO). The emergence of the OFW and the BPO improved the contributions of OFW remittances and investments to growth. In 2004, however, fiscal deficits grew as tax collections fell, perhaps due to rampant and wide scale tax avoidance and tax evasion incidences. The administration pushed for the enactment of the 12% VAT and the E-VAT to increase tax revenue and address the large fiscal deficits; this boosted fiscal policy confidence and brought the economy back on track.

Soon afterwards, political instability afflicted the country and the economy anew with Abu Sayyaf terrors intensifying. The Arroyo administration went through many raps and charges because of some controversial deals such as the NBN–ZTE deal corruption scandal. Due however to the support of local leaders and the majority of the House of Representatives, political stability was restored and threats to the administration were subdued. Towards the end of the administration, high inflation rates for rice and oil in 2008 resulting from the 2008 financial crisis started to plague the country, leading to another fiscal crisis.

The important policies of the Arroyo administration highlighted the importance of regional development, tourism, and foreign investments into the country. The administration pushed for regional development studies to address certain regional issues such as disparities in regional per capita income and the effects of commercial communities on rural growth. The administration also advocated for investments to improve tourism, especially in other unexplored regions that need development. To further improve tourism, the administration launched the policy touching on Holiday economics, which involves the changing of days in which certain holidays are celebrated. Through the Holiday economics approach, investments and tourism improved. The administration frequently visited other countries to encourage foreign investment.

==== Benigno Aquino III administration (2010–2016) ====
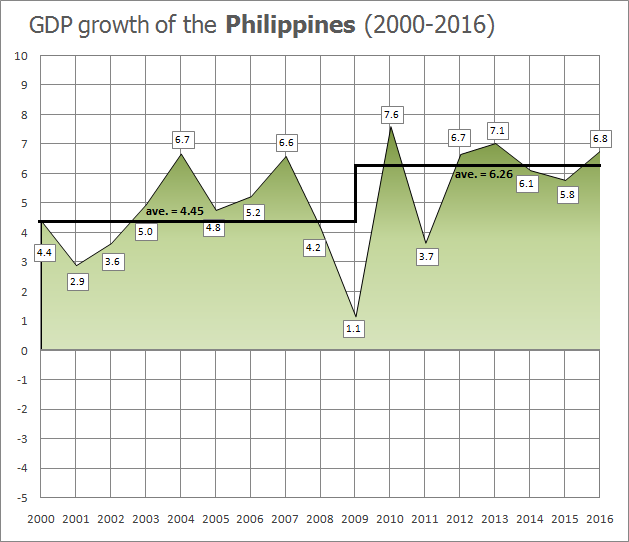
Philippine GDP growth 2000–2016

During the latter years of the Arroyo presidency up to the Benigno Aquino III administration, the government managed foreign debts falling from 58% in 2008 to 47% of total government borrowings. According to the 2012 World Wealth Report, the Philippines was the fastest growing economy in the world in 2010 with a GDP growth of 7.3% driven by the growing business process outsourcing and overseas remittances.

The country slipped to 3.6% in 2011 after the government placed less emphasis on exports and spent less on infrastructure. In addition, the disruption of the flow of imports for raw materials as a result from floods in Thailand and the tsunami in Japan affected the manufacturing sector in the same year. "The Philippines contributed more than $125 million as of end-2011 to the pool of money disbursed by the International Monetary Fund to help address the financial crisis confronting economies in Europe."

The economy saw continuous real GDP growth of at least 5% since 2012. The Philippine Stock Exchange index ended 2012 with 5,812.73 points a 32.95% growth from the 4,371.96-finish in 2011.

The Philippines achieved an investment grade rating for the first time in the first quarter of 2013. It was awarded a "BBB-" rating by Fitch Ratings because of its economy's resilience due to remittances, growth despite the global economic crisis in the last five years, VAT reforms (starting 2005), the BSP's inflation management, and in particular good-governance reforms under the Aquino administration.

== 2008 financial crisis and response ==
The 2008 financial crisis pulled countries around the globe into a recession. Following the 1997 Asian financial crisis, the 2008 crisis imposed new challenges to the Philippines as a developing country. The following are expositions of the macroeconomic impacts of the crisis on the Philippines, its implications in the prevalent poverty scenario, and policies and programs undertaken by the government in response to the crisis.

=== Overview of the global economic crisis ===
The 2008 global economic crisis started upon the bursting of the United States housing bubble, which was followed by bankruptcies, bailouts, foreclosures, and takeovers of financial institutions by national governments. During a period of housing and credit booms, banks encouraged lending to home owners by a considerably high amount without appropriate level of transparency and financial supervision. As interest rates rose in mid-2007, housing prices dropped extensively, and all institutions that borrowed and invested found themselves suffering significant losses. Financial institutions, insurance companies, and investment houses either declared bankruptcy or had to be rescued financially. Economies worldwide slowed during this period and entered recession.

The crisis, initially financial in nature, took on a full-blown economic and global scale affecting every country, both industrialized and developing.

=== The Philippine situation before the crisis ===
The Philippines has long had long-term structural problems that interfere with sustainable economic development. The country has been dominated by a sequence of growth spurts, brief and mediocre, followed by sharp to very-sharp, severe, and extended downturns—a cycle that came to be known as the boom-bust cycle. As such, economic growth record of the country has been disappointing in comparison with its East Asian counterparts in terms of per capita GDP. In addition, in 2007, an absolute poverty incidence of 13.2 percent—higher than Indonesia's 7.7 and Vietnam's 8.4 percent—was recorded, illustrating the unequal distribution of wealth and corruption that inhibits the growth and development of the Philippines.

=== Macroeconomic impacts of the crisis ===
The Philippines was affected by the crisis in a decline in three aspects: exports, remittances from overseas Filipino workers, and foreign direct investments. Heavily dependent on electronic and semiconductor exports, the Philippines saw a downward trend in its export earnings as countries in demand of these exports entered recession. The recession also put at risk the jobs in the developed countries which include those where migrant workers are employed. Consequently, OFW remittances decreased and grew a meagre 3.3% in October 2008. Foreign direct investments (FDI) declined because of investors losing confidence in the financial market. Lower FDIs mean slower economic growth.

==== Impacts on asset markets, financial sector, and real sector ====
The freeze in liquidity in US and European financial markets reversed capital flows to developing countries and induced a rise in the price of risk which entailed a drop in equity prices and exchange rate volatility. However, following the effects of an increase in the foreign currency government bond spread, the Philippine stock market was actually one of the least affected by the crisis with the main index of the stock market dropping only by 24 percent, a relatively low percentage change in comparison to those of other countries across Asia. Similarly, from the period between July 2008 and January 2009, the peso depreciated only by 3 percent, meaning that the peso was one of the currencies least affected by the crisis. This minimal effect on the stock market and the Philippine peso can be attributed to the recovery of asset prices across the Asia-Pacific region in early 2009 as foreign portfolio investments surged.

Financially, the banking system in the Philippines was relatively stable, because of reforms that were put in place since the 1997 Asian financial crisis. Maintenance of high levels of loan to deposit ratios together with the decline of the ratio of nonperforming loans to total loans kept profitability of local banking generally high despite the crisis. To the country's fortune, no meltdowns occurred as during the previous 1997 Asian crisis.

Declines in the growth rate of personal consumption and expenditures and fixed investment occurred in 2008. Personal consumption expenditure, the largest contributor to GDP growth, showed a downward trend from a sharp drop from 5.8 percent in 2007 to 4.7 percent in 2008, and 3.7 percent in 2009. GDP growth during the fourth quarter of 2008 and first quarter of 2009 fell to 1.7 percent, a staggering fall from a 5.7 percent average for the three previous years. Furthermore, a contraction of 29.2 percent occurred in the manufacturing sector involving electricity, gas, water, trade and finance services. The service sector also turned down as growth in the fourth quarter and first quarters of 2008 and 2009, respectively, was a meagre growth of 2.1 percent, a far contrast from the 6.7 percent average from the previous three years. However, the Philippines generally endured the smallest declines in comparison with other East Asian countries. For instance, OFW remittances, though at a slower pace, still grew in the first half of 2009.

=== Impact on fiscal deficit and external accounts ===
To counter adverse effects of the crisis, the Philippine government felt the need to increase its expenditures. Apart from government expenditure, of primary concern was the weak revenues generated by the government with the fiscal deficit reaching P111.8 billion in the first quarter of 2009 as compared to P25.8 billion in the same period of the previous year. Despite suffering the least in terms of the stock exchange and financial markets among East Asian countries, the Philippines lagged in tax receipts in comparison to other nations. Meanwhile, private sector flows in the external account declined and led to a net outflow of $708 million in 2009, a sharp turning away from a net inflow of $507 million in 2008. This eventually led to a fall in stock prices and depreciation of the peso.

=== Poverty and social impacts ===
==== Impacts on households and communities ====
An increasing number of Filipino workers became frustrated due to unemployment and low standards of living in the country. Thousands of Filipinos left the country every day to seize better income opportunities. Moreover, around five million Filipino children were unable to go to school and are forced to work on the streets or in other various workplaces where they could find some food.

==== Impacts on wealth and income and its distribution across different social divisions ====
The country was having sound economic indicators before the 2008 economic crisis. Average income per capita was increasing while poverty incidence showed a downward trend. Average income per capita rose by 2% in 2007 and 2008, whereas poverty incidence dropped from 33.0% in 2006 to 31.8% in 2007 and 28.1% in 2008. Output growth plunged in 2009, causing real mean income to fall by 2.1%, resulting in an upward pressure on poverty incidence (which grew by 1.6%). Most hit were households with associations to industry resulting in the average income to drop to levels below that of 2007. Similarly, wage and salary workers were hit significantly. Surprisingly, the poorest 20% did not suffer the same fate they suffered in crises past. The global economic crisis put a halt on the highly promising growth trend of the Philippine economy and forced 2 million Filipinos into poverty.

==== Coping strategies ====
i. Finances

Close to 22% of the population reduced their spending, 11% used their existing savings for consumption, 5% pawned assets, 2% sold assets, 36% borrowed money and 5% defaulted on debts.

ii. Education

To reduce spending, households had to risk the quality of education of their children. Some children were transferred from private to public schools, while some were withdrawn from school. Moreover, parents reduced the allowance of the students, and resorted to secondhand uniforms, shoes and books.

iii. Health

Coping strategies may have negative effects on their long-term health as these affected households commonly resort to self-medication, or shift to seeing doctors in government health centers and hospital. Many households in the urban sector shifted to generic drugs while rural households tended to use herbal medicines, such as sambong for colds and kidney stones.

=== Policy responses ===
==== Efforts of poverty alleviation, reduction, eradication ====
The Medium-Term Philippine Development Plan (MTPDP) was implemented during the Ramos Administration and later on continued by the following administrations to help reduce poverty in the country and improve on the economic welfare of the Filipinos. The Ramos Administration (1993–1998) targeted to reduce poverty from 39.2% in 1991 to about 30% by 1998. The Estrada Administration (1999–2004) then targeted to reduce poverty incidence from 32% in 1997 to 25–28% by 2004, while the Arroyo government targeted to reduce poverty to 17% by creating 10 million jobs but this promise was not fulfilled by the administration.

President Benigno Aquino III planned to expand the Conditional Cash Transfer (CCT) program from 1 to 2.3 million households, and several long-term investments in education and healthcare. Also, in September 2010, Aquino met with US Secretary of State, Hillary Clinton, during the signing of the $434-million Millennium Challenge Corporation (MCC) grant in New York. The MCC grant would fund infrastructure and rural development programs in the Philippines to reduce poverty and spur economic growth.

==== Macroeconomic and social protection programs ====
To respond to the financial crisis, the Philippine government, through the Department of Finance and National Economic and Development Authority (NEDA), crafted a PhP 330-billion fiscal package, formally known as the Economic Resiliency Plan (ERP). The ERP was geared towards the stimulation of the economy through tax cuts, increased government spending, and public-private sector projects that could also prepare the country for the eventual upturn of the global economy.

==== Regional responses ====
The Network of East Asian Think Tanks proposed the establishment of the Asia Investment Infrastructure Fund (AIIF) to prioritize the funding of infrastructure projects in the region to support suffering industries. The AIIF, as well as multilateral institutions (especially the Asian Development Bank), also promotes greater domestic demand and intra-regional trade to offset the decline in exports to industrialized countries and narrow the development gap in the region.

== Since 2022 ==
On 30 June 2022, Bongbong Marcos was sworn in as the president of the Philippines. His policy has been to attract foreign investments, especially targeting sectors like renewable energy, infrastructure and mining. The response from international business communities has mainly been positive. GDP growth is expected to reach 6.0 percent in 2024, making the Philippines one of the fastest growing economies in the region. Inflation is expected to decline to 3.4 percent in 2024.

In September 2025, the government enacted the Accelerated and Reformed Right-of-Way (ARROW) Act (Republic Act No. 12289), which streamlines land acquisition and compensation procedures for national infrastructure projects. The law aims to minimize project delays, improve transparency in public works, and accelerate the completion of roads, bridges, airports, and other priority developments.

According to Richard Heydarian, citing Ha-Joon Chang, whose case study was the Miracle on the Han River, there is an urgent need for a more robust and consistent industrialization if the Philippines were to catch up to its neighbors. Heydarian noted that in 2022, only 19 percent of the Philippine GDP output was of industrial origin, and only 7 percent of the population at that time is employed in industry.

== Bibliography ==
- Balisacan, Arsenio, and Hall Hill, eds. The Dynamics of Regional Development: The Philippines in East Asia. Quezon City: Ateneo de Manila UP, 2007. ISBN 978-971-550-532-1
- Balisacan, Arsenio, and Hall Hill, eds. The Philippine Economy: Development, Policies and Challenges. Quezon City: Ateneo de Manila UP, 2003. ISBN 971-550-430-2
- Bernardo, Romeo, and Marie-Christine Tang. "The Political Economy of Reform during the Ramos Administration (1992–98).” Commission on Growth and Development. May 16, 2011 <https://web.archive.org/web/20110724225207/http://www.growthcommission.org/storage/cgdev/documents/gcwp039web.pdf>.
- Canlas, Dante. "Political Governance, Economic Policy Reforms, and Aid Effectiveness: The Case of the Philippines with Lessons from the Ramos Administration". May 16, 2011 <http://www.grips.ac.jp/forum/pdf07/07june07/canlas1.pdf >.
- Lopez, Edu, and Chino Leyco. "GDP up by 7.3% in 2010". Manila Bulletin. January 31, 2011. May 18, 2011. <https://web.archive.org/web/20110303123643/http://www.mb.com.ph/node/301722/gdp-73-2010>.
- National Statistical Coordination Board. The Philippine Statistical Yearbook. 1994 ed. Makati: NSCB, 1994. ISSN 0118-1564
- National Statistical Coordination Board. The Philippine Statistical Yearbook. 2003 ed. Makati: NSCB, 2003. ISSN 0118-1564
- National Statistical Coordination Board. The Philippine Statistical Yearbook. 2010 ed. Makati: NSCB, 2010. ISSN 0118-1564
- Ochoa, Cecilia. "The Rural Sector and the Ramos Administration". May 16, 2011 <http://journals.upd.edu.ph/index.php/kasarinlan/article/download/1419/1376>.
- The Impact of Trade on Employment in the Philippines: Country Report (PDF). Makati City, Philippines: International Labour Organization. April 2019. ISBN 978-92-2-133021-9. Archived from the original (PDF) on January 24, 2022.
- Villegas, Bernardo. Guide to Economics for Filipinos. Manila: Sinag-Tala, 2001. ISBN 971-554-138-0
- "Impact of the Global Financial Crisis on the Philippines" (PDF) (Press release). Philippine Institute for Development Studies. February 14, 2007.
