= Pulilu =

Pre-hispanic Filipino nation

Locations of pre-colonial principalities, polities, kingdoms and sultanates in the Philippine archipelago

Pulilu was a prehispanic barangay centered at present-day Polillo, Quezon and was mentioned in the Chinese Gazetteer Zhu Fan Zhi 諸蕃志 (1225).

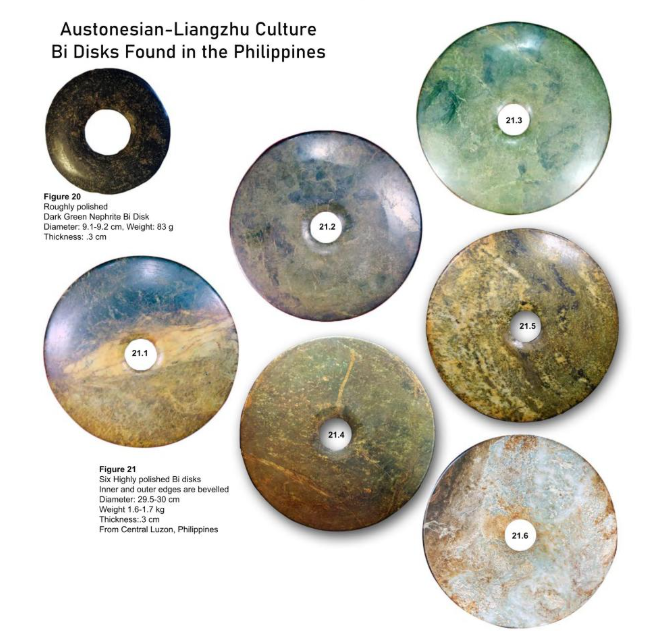
Various Circular Jade Bi Discs symbolizing the heavens found in Luzon Philippines where Pulilu is located.

It is described as politically connected to the polity of Sandao "三嶋" in the Calamianes which itself was of lesser rank to the larger country of Ma-i "麻逸" centered in Mindoro. Its people were recorded to be warlike, and prone to pillaging and conflict. In this area, the sea is full of coral reefs, which have wavy surfaces that resemble decaying tree trunks or razor blades. Ships going by the reefs must be ready to make sharp maneuvers to avoid them because they are sharper than swords and halberds. Red coral and blue langgan coral are also produced here, however they are quite difficult to find. It is also similar to Sandao in local customs and trade products. The chief export of this small polity are rare corals.
