= Sandao =

Pre-hispanic Filipino nation

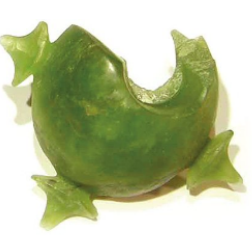
An example of a Jade Lingling-o from Palawan island, Sandao "三嶋" which included Palawan was a source of high quality carved Jade that was exported.

Sāndǎo (Chinese: 三嶋; pinyin: Sāndǎo; Pe̍h-ōe-jī: Sam-tó; lit. 'Three Islands'), also known as Sanyu (Chinese: 三嶼; pinyin: Sānyǔ; Pe̍h-ōe-jī: Sam-sū; lit. 'Three Islets') and Sanshu (Japanese: 三洲(さんしゅう), romanized: Sanshū; Chinese: 三洲; pinyin: Sānzhōu; Pe̍h-ōe-jī: Sam-chiu; lit. 'Three Islets'), were a collection of a prehispanic Philippine polities recorded in Chinese annals as a nation occupying the islands of Chinese: 加麻延; pinyin: Jiāmáyán; Pe̍h-ōe-jī: Ka-mâ-iân (present-day Calamian), Chinese: 巴姥酉; pinyin: Bālǎoyǒu; Pe̍h-ōe-jī: Pa-ló-iú (present-day Palawan), and Chinese: 蒲裏喚; pinyin: Púlǐhuàn; Pe̍h-ōe-jī: Pô͘-lí-hoàn (possibly Pulilan, near present-day Manila). In the Chinese Gazetteer the Zhūfān zhì 諸蕃志 (1225), they were described as tributary states of the more powerful nation of Ma-i (Chinese: 麻逸; pinyin: Máyì; Wade–Giles: Ma^{2}-i^{4}; Pe̍h-ōe-jī: Mâ-i̍t) centered in nearby Mindoro.

They described Sandao as thus:

The Three Islands are tributary states of Mayi (Mindoro or Bay). They are called Jiamayan (Calamian), Balaoyou (Palawan), and Bajinong (possibly Busuanga). Each has its own peoples living scattered among the islands. When merchant ships arrive, they come out to trade. They are collectively called the Three Islands.

Their customs are essentially the same as those of Mayi. Each settlement includes about a thousand families. The terrain is very mountainous, with range after range of steep cliffs like walls. The local people live on high and inaccessible ground for safety, building houses out of rushes. There is no water in the mountains, so the women balance two or three stacked pitchers on their heads to get water from the rivers. When they go back up into the mountains [with their jugs filled], they walk as surely as if on level ground.

In the remote valleys of these islands, there live another kind of people called the Haidan (Aeta). They are small in stature, with round yellow eyes, curly hair, and prominent teeth. They live in nests in the treetops. Sometimes they form bands of three to five and wait in ambush in the undergrowth to shoot arrows at people passing through. Many people have been thus killed by them. But if one throws a porcelain bowl at them, they will stoop down, pick it up, and run away, leaping and shouting with joy.

Whenever foreign merchants arrive at a settlement, they dare not go ashore immediately. Instead, they weigh anchor in mid-stream and beat drums to attract the locals. Local merchants than race to the ship in small canoes, bringing with them kapok, beeswax, native cloth, and coir matting to trade with the foreign merchants.

If they cannot agree on a price, then the chief of the merchants comes himself to negotiate. The foreign merchants give him presents of silk parasols, porcelain vessels, and rattan baskets. One or two local men remain on the ship as hostages, while the foreign merchants go ashore to trade. Once the trading is concluded, the hostages are handed over. Every merchant ship only stops for three or four days before moving on to another settlement. The locals live all along the shores of the Three Islands and every settlement is independent of the others.

Their mountains (or islands) run in a northeastern direction, and when the south[west] wind blows in, great waves dash against the mountains (or islands). The breakers roll so fast that ships cannot anchor there securely. For that reason, merchants coming to trade in the Three Islands usually prepare to make their return voyage in the fourth or fifth lunar month.

When trading in this country, merchants use porcelain ware, black damask, resist-dyed silk, five-colored "burned" beads, lead fishnet weights, and refined tin.

— Zhūfān zhì 諸蕃志 (1225)

Sandao remained tributary states of Ma-i until its territories were invaded by Sulu and Brunei marking the end of their independence.
