= Divine Fury =

Divine Fury may refer to:

- divine fury, a ferocious inspiration sent by the gods
- Gabâ, divine retribution, divine fury; found in Philippine culture
- The Divine Fury, a 2019 South Korean film
- "Divine Fury", a 1998 episode of the comic strip 'Vector 13' from the comic book 2000 A.D.
- "Divine Fury", a 2023 expansion pack to the MMORPG videogame Perfect World (video game)
