= Mahou =

Mahou or Mahō (魔法) is the Japanese word for "magic", "sorcery" or "witchcraft".

Mahou may also refer to:

- Magical Company, also known as Mahou or Mahō, a Japanese video game developer and publisher
- Mahou, Mali, a commune and village
- Mahou language, a variety of Maninka, a group of Manding languages
- Mahou-San Miguel Group, a Spanish brewery
