= Mananambal =

Filipino traditional medicine practitioner

Occupation
- Occupation type: Medicine
- Activity sectors: Folk healer, Medicine man, Sorcerer, Witch

Description
- Competencies: Medicine, Magic
- Fields of employment: Medicine
- Related jobs: Babaylan, Albularyo, Mambabarang

The Mananambal is a Filipino practitioner of traditional medicine; a medicine man who is also capable of performing sorcery. The mananambal treats both natural and supernatural maladies.

== Overview ==
In Cebu, located in the Visayas region of the Philippines, a traditional albularyo is called a Mananambal and their work of healing is called panambal. Like the general albularyo, mananambals obtain their status through ancestry, apprenticeship/observational practice, or through an epiphany and are generally performed by the elders of the community, regardless of gender. Their practice, or panambal, has a combination of elements from Christianity and sorcery which appear to be opposites since one involves faith healing while the other requires Black magic, Witchcraft, etc. The combinations are a reflection of the legacies left from the conversion to Catholicism of the islands from Spanish colonization, since the Indigenous of Cebu had direct contact with the Portuguese explorer Ferdinand Magellan, and on-going Indigenous practices before colonization. The panambals cover natural and supernatural illnesses using a wide range of methods. Two common methods used are herbal medicine and orasyon, healing prayers deriving from a bible equivalency called the librito.

Mananambals treat major and minor ailments. These ailments include but are not limited to: headache, fever, cold, toothache, dengue fever, wounds, Infection, cancer, intellectual impairment, and other illnesses thought to be caused by supernatural creatures. Aside from biological treatments, patients may also come to mananambals to form or break any form of relationships from marriage to friendships. Treatments are dependent on the type of sickness and on the mananambal themselves.

Mananambal practice is on-going into the present. In 1997, the Philippine Government enacted theTraditional and Alternative Medicine Act (TAMA) legalizing Indigenous medicine. Patients that seek help from mananambals are more commonly found in the low-income class and are in isolated communities because of the payment options. Paying the shaman is either not necessary or cheap. It can also be in the form of trade for life-stock and food.

== Etymology ==
The appellation mananambal is a derivative of the term for the art of panambal or "traditional folk healing" in the Philippines, a term used most especially in the islands of Siquijor and Bohol in the Visayas. The term is synonymous with the Tagalog word albularyo, a type of folk healer.

== Methodology ==
The mananambal uses a combination of traditional practice and Christian beliefs. The amalgamation of folk healing and Christian spiritism may have begun at the onset of the Spanish influence in the Philippines – when Magellan converted the Queen of Cebu to Catholicism. The mananambal observed the marked success in exorcism of the Spanish friars and wished for their part to be mediums of the high spirit (the Holy Spirit) that granted the Catholic friars such power.

This link with the Catholic faith is evident in their yearly quest, called pangalap, for materials used as ingredients in the concoctions for their traditional practice. The pangalap begins seven Fridays after Ash Wednesday, prior to the Christian observance of Holy Week. It culminates on Good Friday and Black Saturday. The mananambal also uses orasyones or "magical prayers".

=== Pharmacopoeia ===
The mananambal's pharmacopoeia is made up of plants (80%), animals (10%) and minerals (10%).

=== Rituals ===
Some of the rituals observed by the mananambal include:

- Pangalap - the aforementioned yearly search for concoction ingredients
- Halad - ritual offering of food and drink to honor the spirits of the dead
- Palínà - ritual fumigation; called tu-ob in the islands of Panay and Negros
- Pangadlip - the chopping or slicing of pangalap ingredients
- Pagpagong - burning or reducing the ingredients into charcoal or ashes
- Making of Minasa - concoctions made from the pangalap ingredients
- Rubbing with Lana - medicinal oil concocted from coconut

==== The use of herbal remedies ====
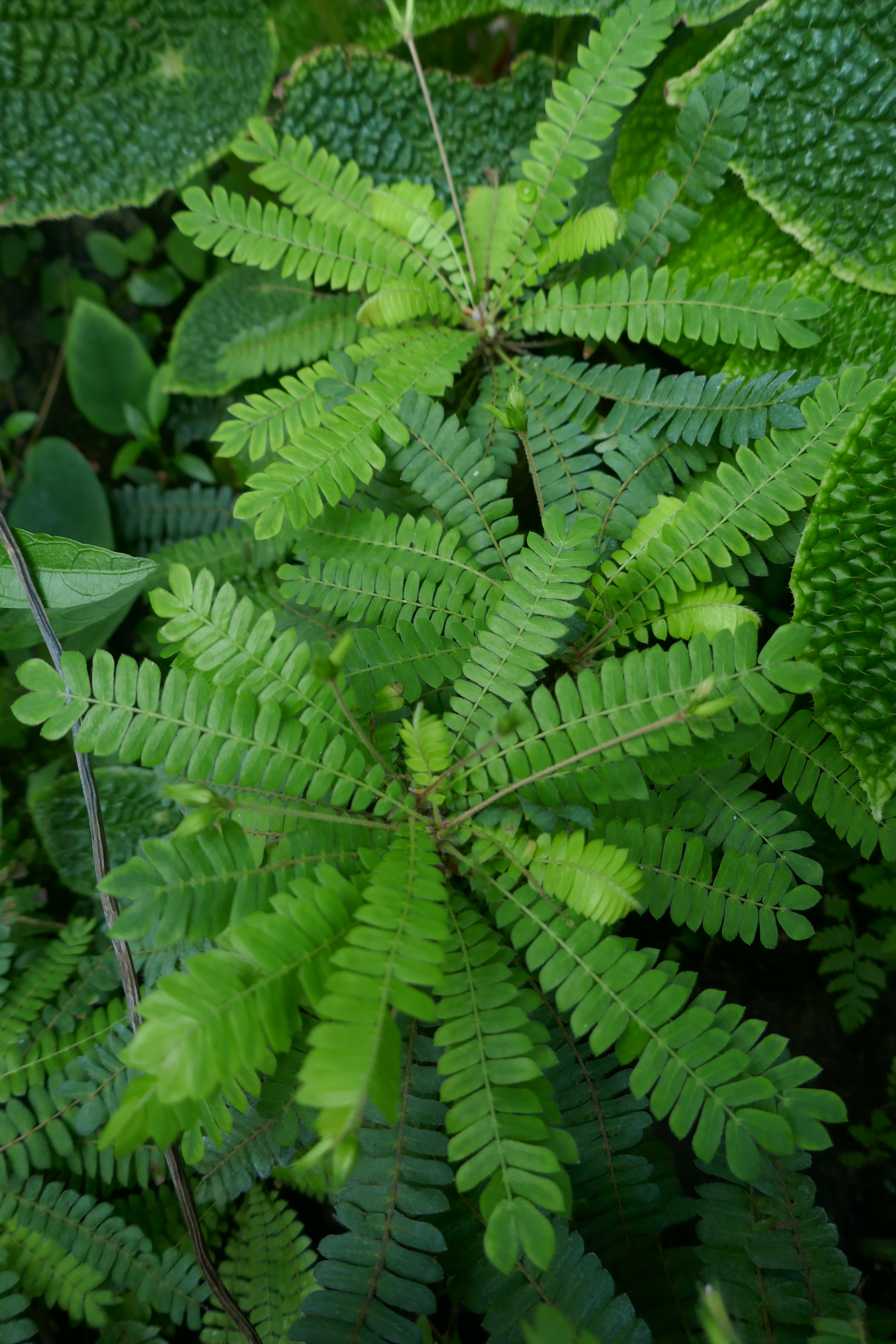
Biophytum sensitivum, also known as sensitive plant, is used by some mananambal to treat fatigue.

Herbal remedies are conducted in a variety of ways including decoction (tea making), expression (pounding of the plant then applying the extract on affected area), and infusion (infusing plants in water for a certain period of time then applying the result to affected areas). These particular botanical remedies involve extracting the essential parts out of the plant material, and can be transformed into oil, ointment, and other forms of medicine. The Rubbing of Lana is the use of botanic oil from coconut and rubbing it onto affected areas. Plant materials consist of leaves, tree bark, and roots. Herbal extracts can either be consumed or applied to affected area(s).

Plants for herbal medicine are obtained through a panagalap or the search for plants in mountains and forests which then undergo fumigation or palina. Aside from plants, this yearly concoction search also scavengers for potions, candles, oil, and amulets.

A plethora of medicinal plants are used in the Cebuano region and as mentioned above, depend on the mananambal and their diagnosis of the illness. Common plants used by mananambals are Mangagaw (Euphoria hirta) for dengue fever, Dapdap (Erythrina variegata) for hemorrhoids, Tuba-Tuba(Jatropha curcas) for arthritis, Noog-noog (Solanum) for hyperacidity, Wachichao (Orthosiphon aristatus) for kidney problems, Sabana/Labana (Soursop) for cancer, and Kipi-kipi for fatigue (Biophytum sensitivum). Kipi-kipi is a plant known around Southeast Asia for its instant sensitivity to touch.

==== Orasyon ====
Orasyons encompass the Catholic aspect of the panambal. As mentioned above, orasyons are given by the librito which has an unknown origin. There are theories that connect the librito with the Spanish missionaries either before or during colonization because of its Latin texts. This form of treatment can be done through the blessing of a medicinal object given to the patient by prayer or blessing the patients directly. Orasyons can be combined with other treatments.

==== Other remedies ====
Botany and prayers can be combined with other remedies. Tayhop is a ritual procedure performed through the combination of the blowing the patient's head gently with prayer. Another ritual procedure that is accompanied with orasyon is tutho, the application of saliva on the patient's head.

Supernatural procedures consists of panubay, using supernatural manifestations to diagnose the patient, and pagtamabalsa nasuldan which is the performance of exorcism.

Due to the Philippines' position as a geopolitical gateway to Southeast Asia, medicinal influences from visitors and immigrants to the islands influenced and formed remedies. Certain mananambal methods aligned with their neighboring countries, such as China. One of these shared methods is Cupping therapy, an ancient therapy method using special suction cups on affected areas of the skin.

== Sorcery ==
The powers of sorcery may be gained after a practitioner "learns methods of malign magic and establishes a relationship with a spirit that supports this magic". Some forms of sorcery include:

- Barang - the use of familiar spirit to inflict pain and sickness in a person
- Haplit - using a doll to represent the victim; the Filipino sorcerer's equivalent of using a voodoo doll
- Paktol - paktol means to "knock on the head"; the use of a skull or some other representation of the victim. Any insult done to the representation, the victim feels the corresponding harm
- Anyaw - the art of courting the favor of malign spirits with food containing no salt; the sorcerer then asks the spirit to bring harm on an intended victim
- Là-gà - "to boil", the sorcerer boils objects belonging to the victim; the victim suffers from unease, sleeplessness, fatigue, malaise and later, death

These forms of sorcery equate with the Tagalog term, Kulam and are resistant to the ministrations of Western medicine. Only a mananambal can reverse the effects of such sorcery.

== See also ==
- Gabâ, or gabaa, the Cebuano concept of negative karma
