= Indigenous Philippine folk religions =

Native religions of the Philippines

Indigenous Philippine folk religions are the distinct native religions of various ethnic groups in the Philippines, where most follow belief systems in line with animism. These indigenous folk religions include a set of local worship traditions that are devoted to the anito or diwata (and their variables), terms which translate to gods, spirits, and ancestors.

Many narratives within indigenous folk religions are transmitted orally to subsequent generations, but many have also been written down. The Spanish colonizers claimed that the indigenous peoples lacked religious writings, but records indicate otherwise. Accounts, both from Chinese and Spanish sources have explicitly noted the existence of indigenous religious writings. There are also Spanish records of indigenous religious books and scrolls, along with indigenous statues of gods, being burned by colonizers. In some sources, the Spanish claim that no such religious writings exist, whereas the same chronicle records that such books were burned at their own order. These were written on native reeds and leaves using iron points and other local pens, similar to how texts are written on papyrus, and were fashioned either as scrolls or as books. Some were written on bamboo.

0.23% of the population of the Philippines are affiliated with indigenous Philippine folk religions according to the 2020 national census, an increase from the previous 0.19% from the 2010 census.

The profusion of different terms arises from the fact that these indigenous religions mostly flourished in the pre-colonial period, before the Philippines had become a single nation. The various peoples of the Philippines spoke different languages and thus used different terms to describe their religious beliefs. While these beliefs can be treated as separate religions, scholars have noted that they follow a "common structural framework of ideas" which can be studied together. The various Indigenous Philippine religious beliefs are related to the various religions of Oceania and the maritime Southeast Asia, which draw their roots from Austronesian beliefs as those in the Philippines.

The folklore narratives associated with these religious beliefs constitute what is now called Philippine mythology, and is an important aspect of the study of the culture of the Philippines and Filipino psychology.

== Religious worldview ==
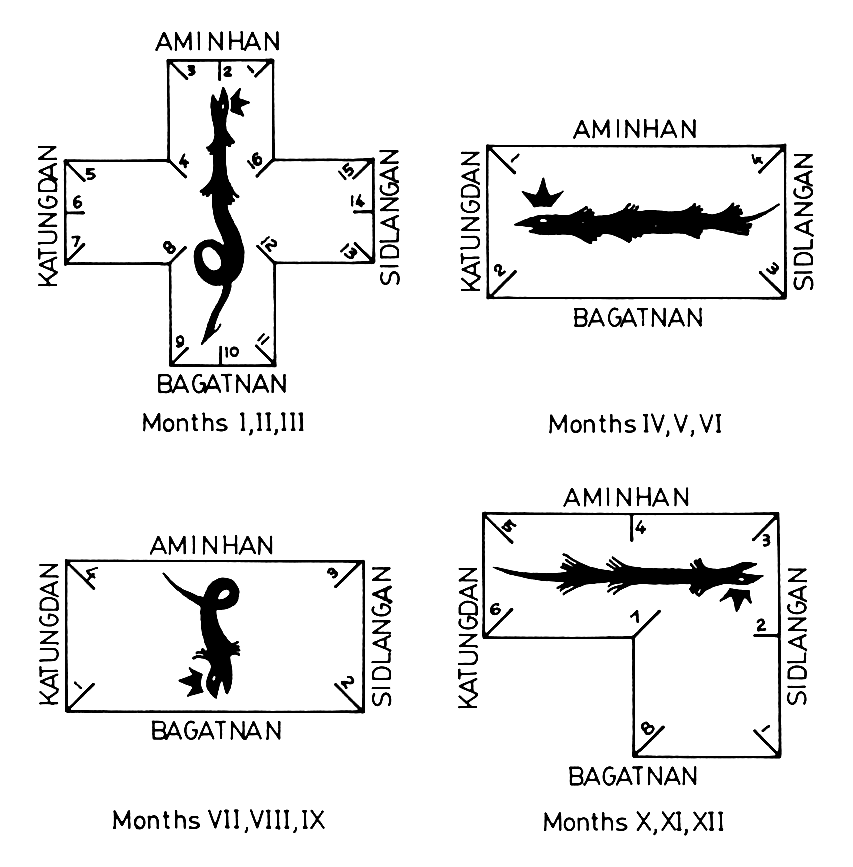
The rotation of the god Bakunawa in a calendar year, as explained in the Signosan (1919). The depictions narrate ancestral understandings towards the proper creation of the physical house as a spiritual home.

Historian T. Valentino Sitoy, in his review of documents concerning pre-Spanish religious beliefs, notes three core characteristics which shaped the religious worldview of Filipinos throughout the archipelago before the arrival of Spanish colonizers. First, Filipinos believed in the existence of a parallel spirit world, invisible yet influencing the visible world. Second, Filipinos believed that there were spirits (diwata) everywhere, ranging from the high creator gods to minor spirits that inhabited the environment, such as trees, rocks, or creeks. Third, Filipinos believed that events in the human world were influenced by the actions and interventions of these spirit beings.

The indigenous religions in the Philippines are the ancient beliefs and traditions of various ethnic groups in the country. Most of them believe in animism, where it is believed that all things people, animals, plants, and even nature have a spirit or soul called Diwa. In these religions, there are two main types of spirits:

Diwata – This refers to deities, gods, and nature spirits.

Anito – These are wooden statues and the spirits or souls of the dead, especially those of ancestors.

Anito or umalagad are 'ancestor spirits', and diwata 'nature spirits and deities', in the animistic religions of the precolonial Philippines.

Pag-anito (also called mag-anito or anitohan) is a séance, ritual where people communicate with the spirits of the dead or their ancestors. It is often done with the help of a shaman called a babaylan in Visayan or a katalonan in Tagalog who acts as a medium to connect with these spirits. This ritual is usually accompanied by celebrations or other ceremonies. If the ritual involves communication with nature spirits or deities, it is called pagdiwata (also magdiwata or diwatahan). Anito can also mean worship or making an offering to a spirit.

When Spanish missionaries arrived in the Philippines, the word anito came to be associated with the physical representations of spirits that featured prominently in pag-anito rituals. During the American rule of the Philippines (1898–1946), the meaning of the Spanish word idolo ("a thing worshiped") has been further conflated with the English word "idol", and thus anito has come to refer almost exclusively to the carved figures or statues (taotao) of ancestral spirits.

== Deities and spirits ==
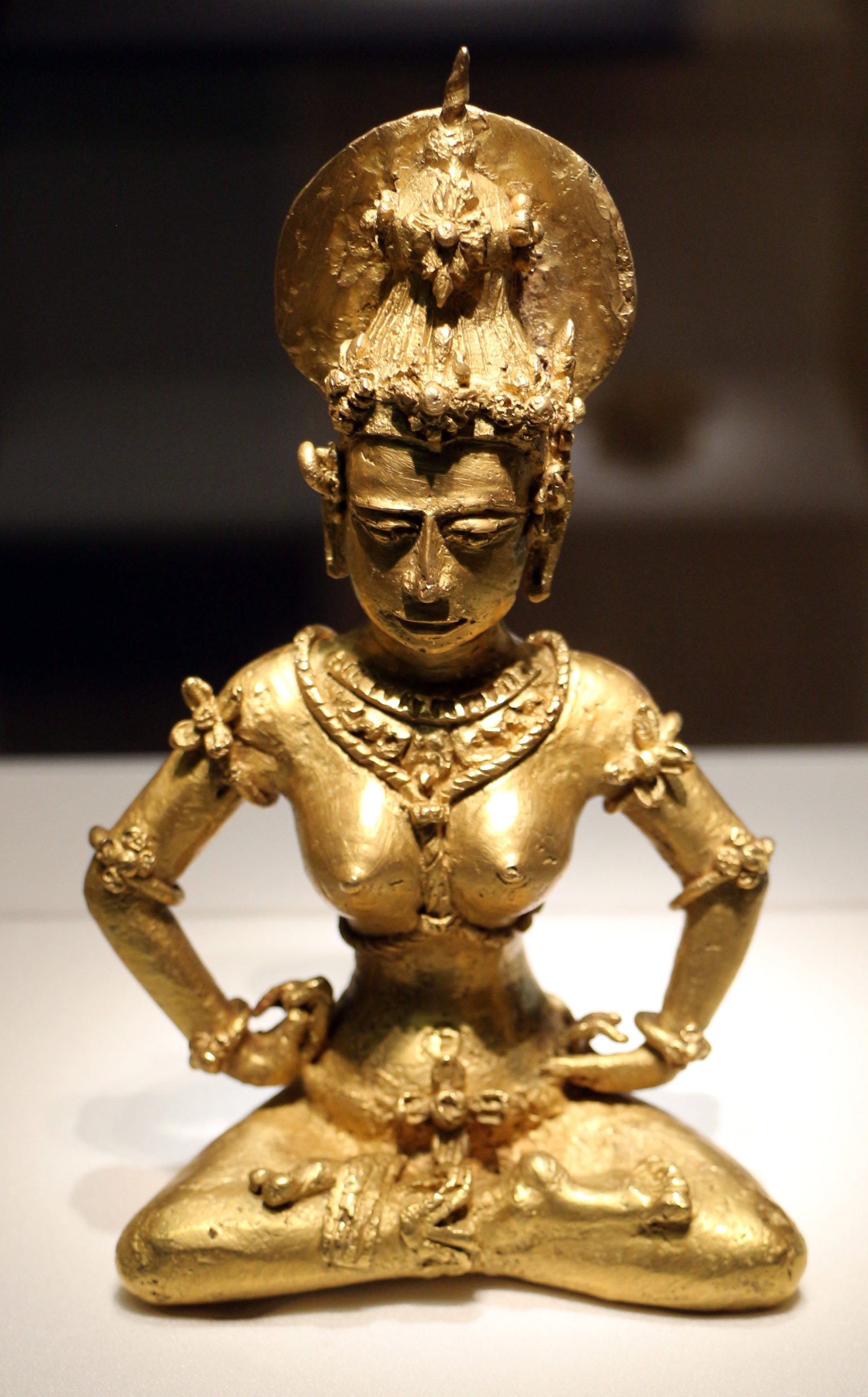
The Agusan image (900–950) discovered in 1917 on the banks of the Wawa River, Agusan del Sur in Mindanao in the Philippines. Although it contains Hindu and Buddhist elements, locals regard it as a vessel for local deities.

=== Creator gods ===
Many Indigenous Filipino cultures assert the existence of a high god, creator god, or sky god. Among the Tagalogs, the supreme god was known as Bathala, who was additionally described as Maykapal (the all-powerful) or Lumikha (the creator). Among the Visayan peoples, the creator God is referred to as Laon, meaning "the ancient one." Among the Manuvu, the highest god was called Manama. Among most of the Cordilleran peoples (with the Apayao region as an exception), the creator and supreme teacher is known as Kabunyan.

In most cases, however, these gods were considered such great beings that they were too distant for ordinary people to approach. People thus tended to pay more attention to "lesser gods" or "assistant deities" who could be more easily approached, and whose wills could be more easily influenced.

=== Lower gods ===
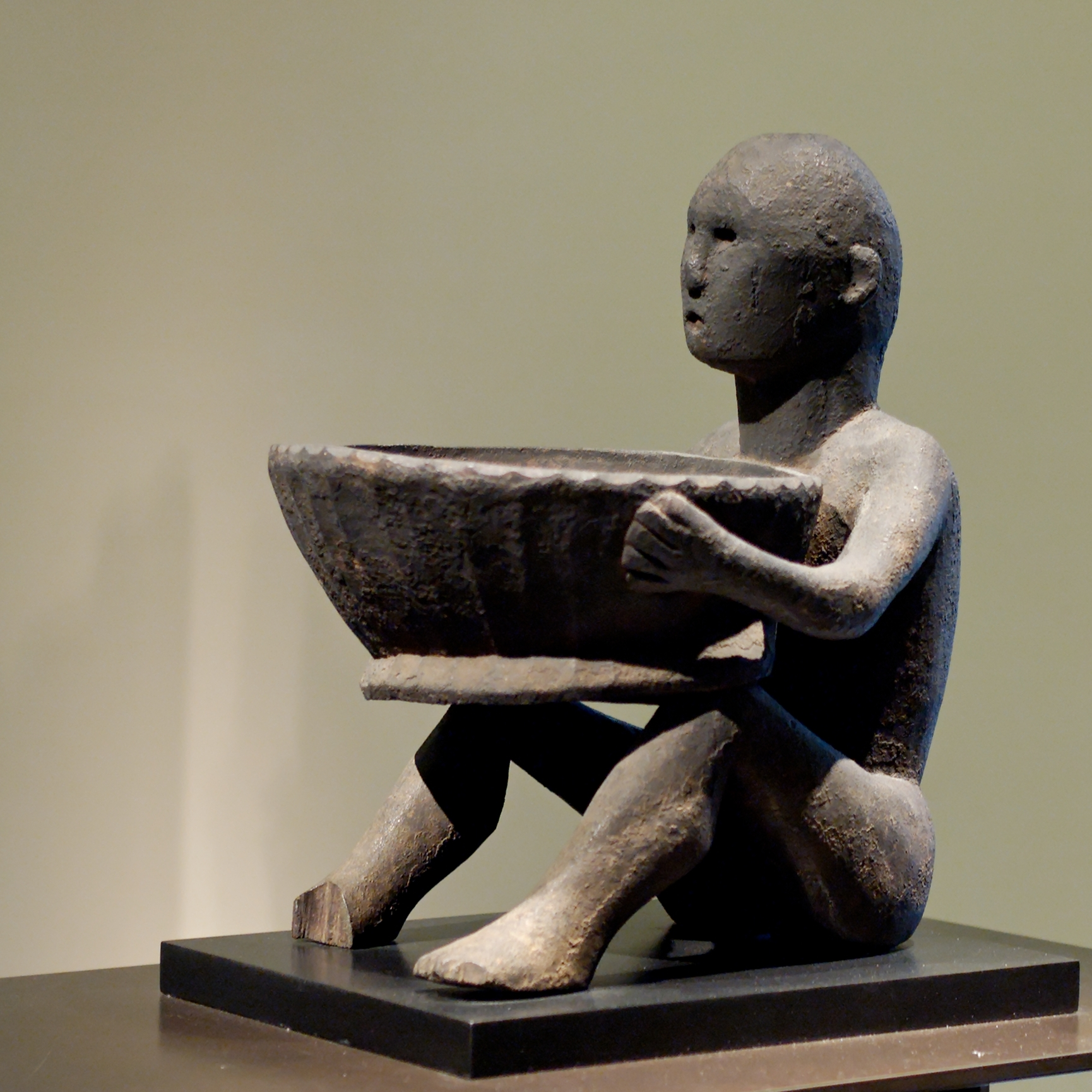
15th century Ifugao bulul with a pamahan (ceremonial bowl). Adherents of the folk religions believe that gods presiding over crops reside within their bululs.

Lesser deities in Filipino religions generally fall into three broad categories: nature spirits residing in the environment, such as a mountain or a tree; guardian spirits responsible for specific aspects of daily life, such as hunting or fishing; and deified ancestors or tribal heroes. These categories frequently overlap, with individual deities falling into two or more categories, and in some instances, deities evolve from one role to another, as when a tribal hero known for fishing becomes a guardian spirit associated with hunting.

== Concept of the soul ==
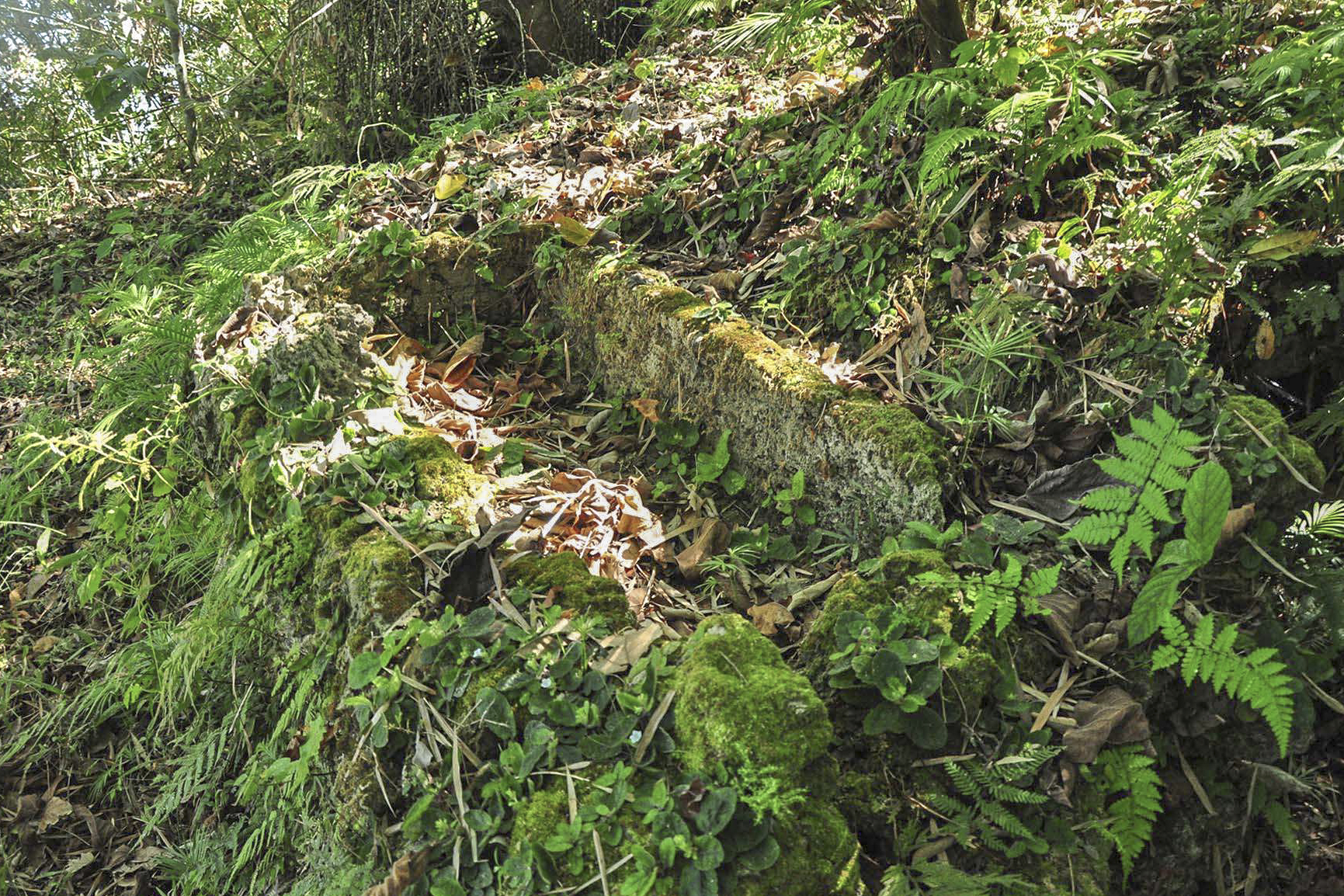
One of the many Limestone tombs of Kamhantik (890–1030 AD), where ancestors were buried and sealed by sarcophagi. Locals believe that the tombs were also created by forest deities, as per tradition.

Each ethnic group has their own concept and number of the soul of a being, notably humans. In most cases, a person has two or more souls while he or she is alive. The origin of a person's soul has been told through narratives concerning the Indigenous Philippine folk religions, where each ethnic religion has its unique concept of soul origin, soul composition, retaining and caring for the soul, and other matters, such as the eventual passage of the soul after the person's life is relinquished. In some cases, the souls are provided by certain deities such as the case among the Tagbanwa, while in others, the soul comes from certain special regions such as the case among the Bisaya. Some people have two souls, such as the Ifugao, while others have five souls such as the Hanunoo Mangyan. In general, a person's physical and mental health contribute to the overall health of the person's soul. In some instances, if a soul is lost, a person will become sick, and if all living souls are gone, then the body eventually dies. However, there are also instances in which the body can still live despite the loss of all of its souls, such as the phenomenon called mekararuanan among the Ibanag. Overall, caring for oneself is essential to long life for the soul, which in turn provides a long life to the body.

Ghosts or ancestral spirits, in a general Philippine concept, are the spirits of those who have already died. In other words, they are the souls of the dead. They are different from the souls of the living, in which, in many instances, a person has two or more living souls, depending on the ethnic group. Each ethnic group in the Philippine islands has their own terms for ghosts and other types of souls. Due to the sheer diversity of Indigenous words for ghosts, terms like espirito and multo, both adopted from Spanish words such as muerto, have been used as all-encompassing terms for the souls or spirits of the dead in mainstream Filipino culture. While ghosts in Western beliefs are generally known for their sometimes horrific nature, ghosts of the dead for the various ethnic groups in the Philippines are traditionally regarded in high esteem. These ghosts are usually referred to as ancestral spirits who can guide and protect their relatives and community, though ancestral spirits can also cast harm if they are disrespected. In many cases among various Filipino ethnic groups, spirits of the dead are traditionally venerated and deified in accordance to ancient belief systems originating from the Indigenous Philippine folk religions.

== Important symbols ==
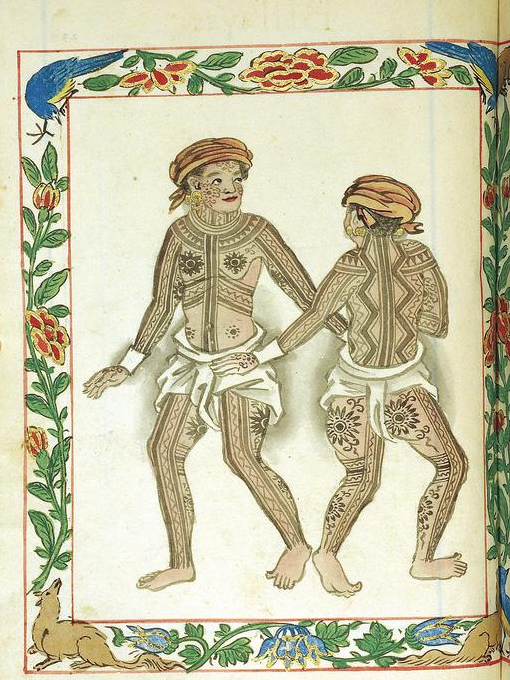
Some tattoo symbols recorded in the Boxer Codex (1590).

Throughout various cultural phases in the archipelago, specific communities of people gradually developed or absorbed notable symbols in their belief systems. Many of these symbols or emblems are deeply rooted in indigenous epics, poems, and pre-colonial beliefs of the natives. Each ethnic group has their own set of culturally important symbols, but there are also "shared symbols" that have influenced many ethnic peoples in a particular area. Some examples of important Anitist symbols are as follow:

- okir – a distinct mark of cultural heritage of the now-Muslim peoples in specific portions of Mindanao; the motif is notable for using only botanical symbols which enhance a variety of works of art made of wood, metal, and even stone
- vulva – an important symbol of fertility, health, and abundance of natural resources; most myths also associate the vulva as the source of life, prosperity, and power
- lingling-o – special fertility ornaments which specific symbols and shapes; notably used by the Ifugao people today, but has been historically used by various people as far as the people of southern Palawan
- moon and sun – highly worshiped symbols which are present as deities in almost all mythologies in the Philippines; portrayals of the sun and moon are notable in the indigenous tattoos of the natives, as well as their fine ornaments and garments
- human statues – there are a variety of human statues made by the natives such as bulul, taotao, and manang; all of which symbolize the deities of specific pantheons
- serpent and bird – two notable symbols of strength, power, creation, death, and life in various mythologies; for serpents, the most notable depictions include dragons, eels, and snakes, while for birds, the most notable depictions are fairy blue-birds, flowerpeckers, eagles, kingfishers, and woodpeckers
- phallus – a symbol associated with creation for various ethnic groups; in some accounts, the phallus was also a source of both healing and sickness, but most myths associate the phallus with fertility
- flower – many tattoos and textile motifs revolve around flower symbols; each ethnic group has their own set of preferred flowers, many of which are stated in their epics and poems
- crocodile – a symbol of strength and life after death; crocodile symbols are also used as deflectors against bad omens and evil spirits
- mountain and forest – many mountains and forests are considered as deities by some ethnic groups, while others consider them as home of the deities such as the case in Aklanon, Bicolano, Hiligaynon, Kapampangan, and Bagobo beliefs
- bamboo and coconut – symbols of creation, defense, sustenance, and resilience; many creation myths depict the bamboo as the source of mankind, while in others, it was utilized by mankind along with the coconut
- rice and root crop – various mythologies magnify the rice stalk, rice grains, and root crops as the primary cultural associations with agriculture; many stories have stated that such crops are gifts from the divine and have nourished the people since ancient times
- betel nut and wine – betel nuts and wines serve important ritual and camaraderie functions among many ethnic groups; these two items are notably consumed by both mortals and deities, and in some myths, they also lead to peace pacts
- tattoo – tattoos are important status, achievement, and beautification symbols in many ethnic beliefs in the country; designs range from crocodiles, snakes, raptors, suns, moons, flowers, rivers, and mountains, among many others
- aspin – dogs are depicted in a variety of means by many mythologies, with many being companions (not servants) of the deities, while others are independent guardians; like other beings, myths on dogs range from good to bad, but most associate them with the divinities
- sea, river, and boat – symbols on seas, rivers, and other water bodies are notable depictions in various mythologies in the Philippines; a stark commonality between various ethnic groups is the presence of unique boat-like technologies, ranging from huge balangays to fast karakoas.

== Shamans ==
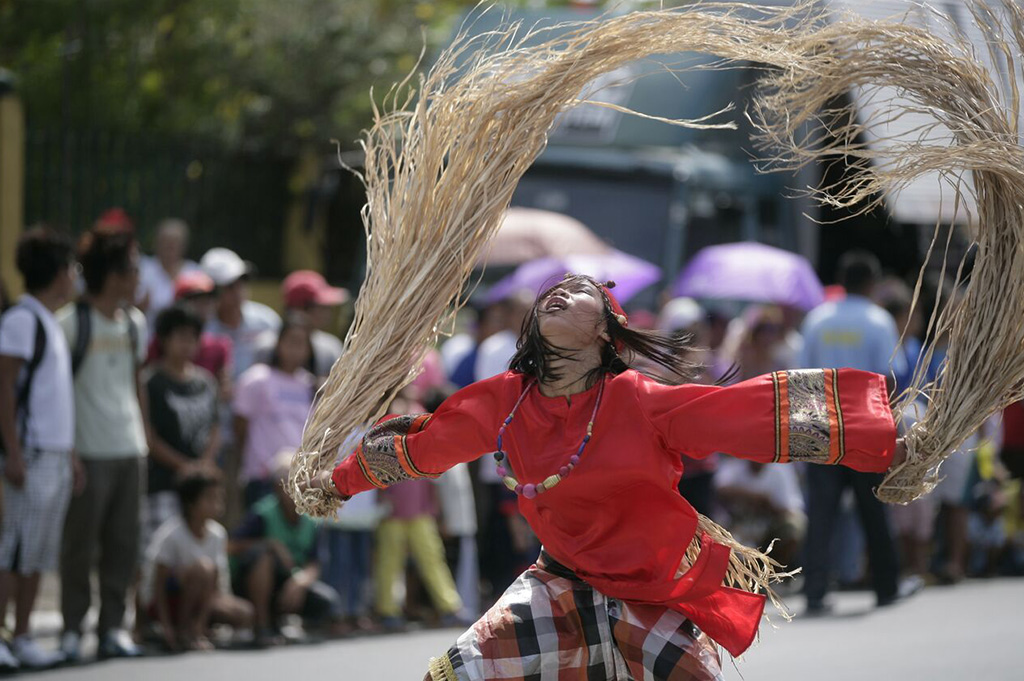
A Hiligaynon woman depicting a babaylan (Visayan shaman) during a festival.

Filipino shamans are the spiritual leaders of various ethnic groups in the Philippines from the precolonial era to the present. These shamans, many of whom are still extant, are almost always women or bakla (effeminate men, also called asog or bayok). They are believed to have spirit guides, by which they could contact and interact with the spirits and deities (anito or diwata) and the spirit world. Their primary role is a medium during the pag-anito. There are also various subtypes of shamans specializing in the arts of traditional medicine and herbalism, divination, and sorcery.

Filipino shamans use various items in their work, including talismans or charms known as agimat or anting-anting, curse-deflecting implements such as Buntot Pagi, and sacred oil concoctions, among many other objects. All social classes, including the shamans, respect and revere their deity statues (called larauan, bulul, manang, etc.), which represent one or more specific deities within their ethnic pantheon, which includes non-ancestor deities and deified ancestors. More general terms used by Spanish sources for native shamans throughout the archipelago were derived from anito; these include terms like maganito and anitera.

The "negative" counterparts of Filipino shamans are witches of the Philippines, which encompasses diverse groups with varying occupations and cultural connotations, depending on the ethnic group with which they are associated. They are completely different from the Western notion of what a witch is. Examples of witches in the Philippines are the mannamay, mangkukulam, and mambabarang. As spiritual mediums and divinators, shamans are notable for countering and preventing the curses and powers of witches, notably through the usage of special items and chants. Aside from the shamans, there are also other types of people who can counter specific magics of witches, such as the mananambal, which specializes in countering barang. Shamans can also counter the curses of supernatural beings such as aswangs. However, because they are mortal humans, the physical strength of shamans are limited compared to the strength of an aswang being. This gap in physical strength is usually bridged by a dynamics of knowledge and wit.

Philippine witches are not necessarily evil; they can also serve the public good. In cases where a crime was met by injustice as the instigator was not persecuted properly or was acquitted despite mounting evidence, the victims or their family and friends can ask for aid from witches to bring justice by way of black magic, which differs per ethnic association. In traditional beliefs outside film depictions in the Philippines, it is held that black magic, in cases of injustice, does not affect the innocent.

== Sacred grounds ==
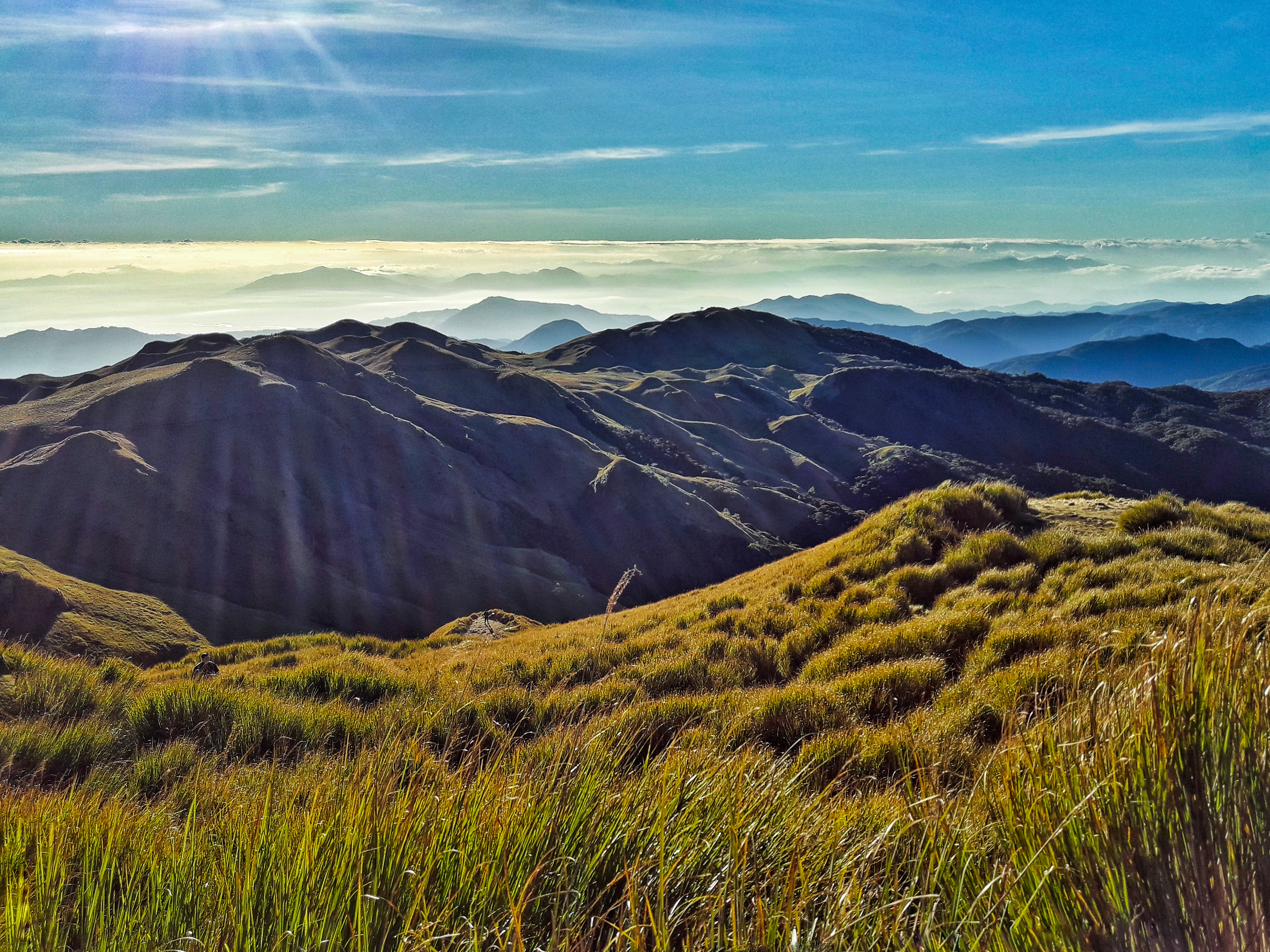
Mount Pulag is one of the many sacred grounds of adherents of the Indigenous Philippine folk religions. Ancestral spirits who guide their descendants are believed to reside throughout the mountain.

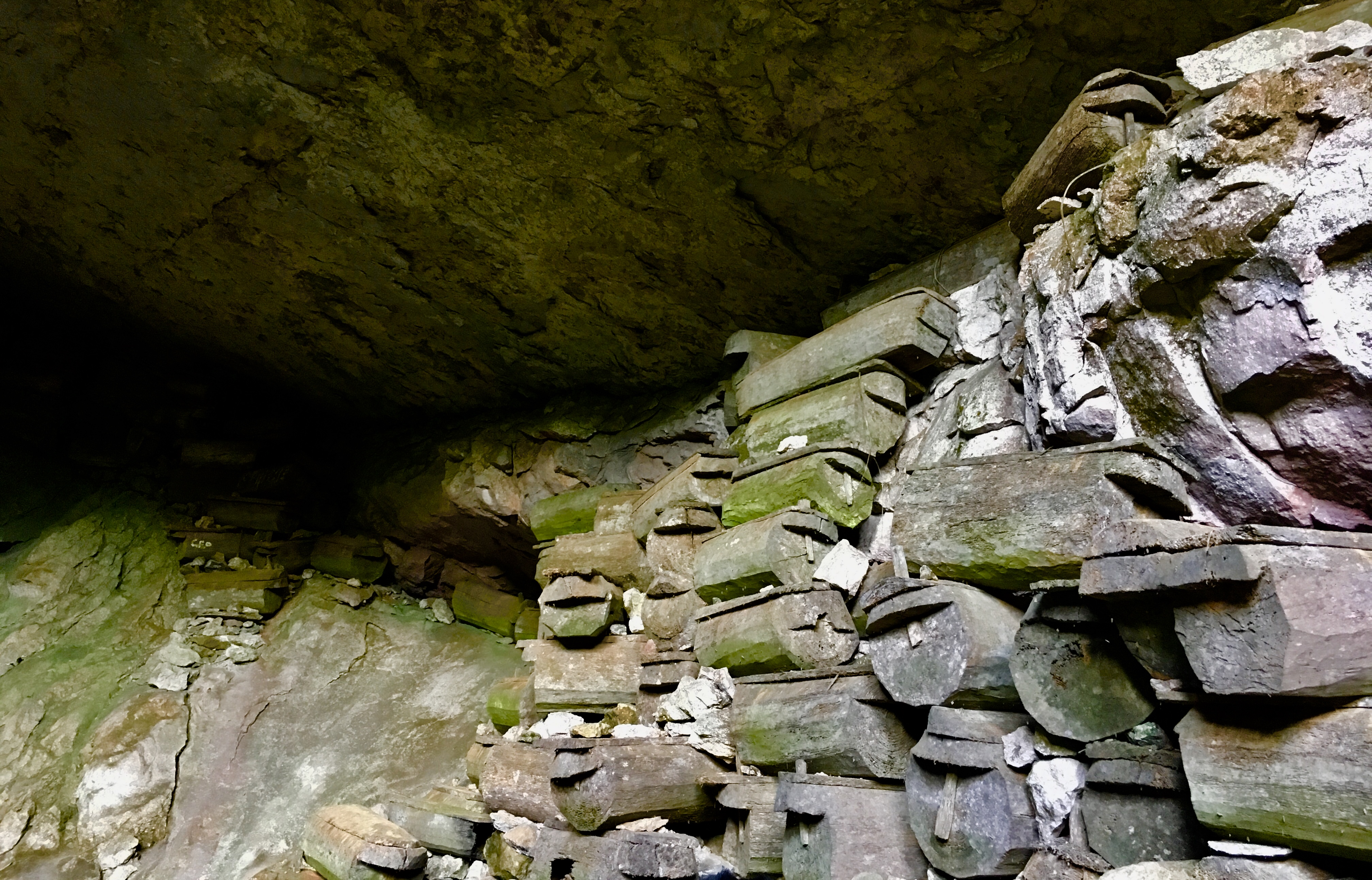
A Kankanaey burial cave in Sagada with coffins stacked-up to form a sky burial within a cave.

Ancient Filipinos and Filipinos who continue to adhere to the indigenous Philippine folk religions generally do not have so-called "temples" of worship under the context known to foreign cultures. However, they do have sacred shrines, which are also called as spirit houses. They can range in size from small roofed platforms, to structures similar to a small house (but with no walls), to shrines that look similar to pagodas, especially in the south where early mosques were also modeled in the same way. These shrines were known in various indigenous terms, which depend on the ethnic group association. (Note: Known as magdantang in Visayan and ulango or simbahan in Tagalog. Among the Itneg, shrines are known tangpap, pangkew, or alalot (for various small roofed altars); and balaua or kalangan (for larger structures). In Mindanao, shrines are known among the Subanen as maligai; among the Teduray as tenin (only entered by shamans); and among the Bagobo as buis (for those built near roads and villages) and parabunnian (for those built near rice fields).(Kroeber, 1918)) They can also be used as places to store taotao and caskets of ancestors. Among Bicolanos, taotao were also kept inside sacred caves called moog.

During certain ceremonies, anito are venerated through temporary altars near sacred places. These were called latangan or lantayan in Visayan, and dambana or lambana in Tagalog. (Note: Also saloko or palaan (Itneg); sakolong (Bontoc); salagnat (Bicolano); sirayangsang (Tagbanwa); ranga (Teduray); and tambara, tigyama, or balekat (Bagobo)) These bamboo or rattan altars are identical in basic construction throughout most of the Philippines. They were either small roofless platforms or standing poles split at the tip (similar to a tiki torch). They held halved coconut shells, metal plates, or martaban jars as receptacles for offerings. Taotao may sometimes also be placed on these platforms.

Other types of sacred places or objects of worship of diwata include the material manifestation of their realms. The most widely venerated were balete trees (also called nonok, nunuk, nonoc, etc.) and anthills or termite mounds (punso). Other examples include mountains, waterfalls, tree groves, reefs, and caves.

Many ethnic peoples in the country have a shared "mountain worship culture", where specific mountains are believed to be the abodes of certain divinities or supernatural beings and aura. Mythical places of worship are also present in some mythologies. Unfortunately, a majority of these places of worship (which include items associated with these sites such as idol statues and ancient documents written in suyat scripts) were brutalized and destroyed by the Spanish colonialists between the 15th to 19th centuries, and were continued to be looted by American imperialists in the early 20th century. Additionally, the lands used by the native people for worship were mockingly converted by the colonialists as the foundation for their foreign churches and cemeteries. Examples of indigenous places of worship that have survived colonialism are mostly natural sites such as mountains, gulfs, lakes, trees, boulders, and caves. Indigenous man-made places of worship are still present in certain communities in the provinces, notably in ancestral domains where the people continue to practice their indigenous religions.

In traditional dambana beliefs, all deities, beings sent by the supreme deity/deities, and ancestor spirits are collectively called anitos or diwata. Supernatural non-anito beings are called lamang-lupa (beings of the land) or bantay-tubig (beings of the sea or other water bodies). The dambana is usually taken care of by the Philippine shamans, the indigenous spiritual leader of the barangay (community), and to some extent, the datu (barangay political leader) and the lakan (barangay coalition political leader) as well. Initially unadorned and revered minimally, damabanas later on were filled with adornments centering on religious practices towards larauan statues due to trade and religious influences from various independent and vassal states. It is adorned with statues home to anitos traditionally-called larauan, statues reserved for future burial practices modernly-called likha, scrolls or documents with suyat baybayin calligraphy, and other objects sacred to dambana practices such as lambanog (distilled coconut wine), tuba (undistilled coconut wine), bulaklak or flowers (like sampaguita, santan, gumamela, tayabak, and native orchids), palay (unhusked rice), bigas (husked rice), shells, pearls, jewels, beads, native crafts such as banga (pottery), native swords and bladed weapons (such as kampilan, dahong palay, bolo, and panabas), bodily accessories (like singsing or rings, kwintas or necklaces, and hikaw or earrings), war shields (such as kalasag), enchanted masks, battle weapons used in pananandata or kali, charms called agimat or anting-anting, curse deflectors such as buntot pagi, native garments and embroideries, food, and gold in the form of adornments (gold belts, necklace, wrist rings, and feet rings) and barter money (piloncitos and gold rings). Animal statues, notably native dogs, guard a dambana structure along with engravings and calligraphy portraying protections and the anitos.

== Status and adherence ==
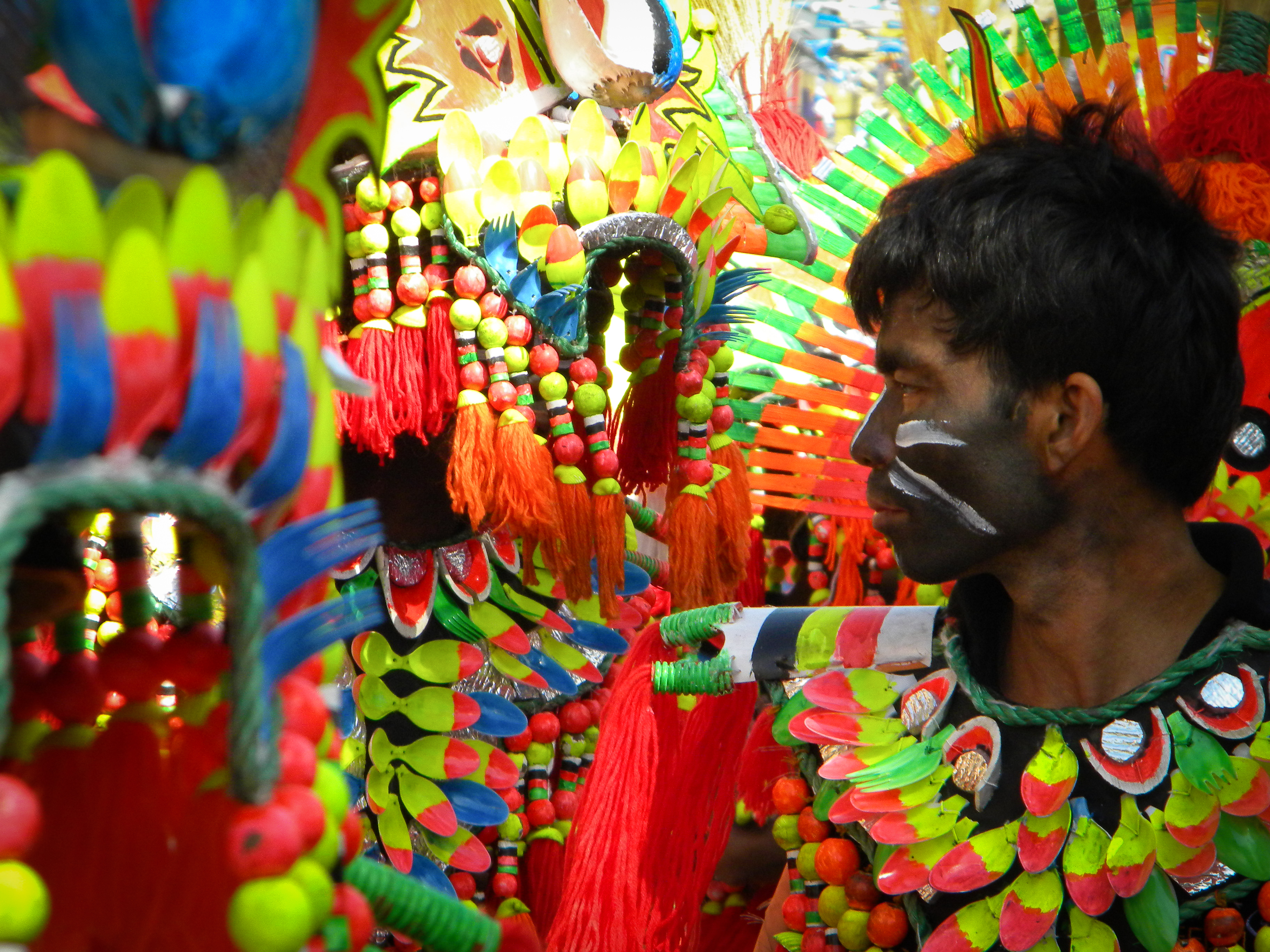
Aklanon participants at the vibrant Ati-Atihan festival, which honors the Ati people and the Aklanon since around 1200 AD through a native thanksgiving tradition based on the indigenous faith.

In 2014, the international astronomical monitoring agency Minor Planet Center (MPC) named Asteroid 1982 XB 3757 Anagolay, after the Tagalog goddess of lost things, Anagolay. In 2019, the International Astronomical Union (IAU) named star Wasp 34 as Aman Sinaya, the Tagalog deity of the ocean, while planet Wasp 34-b was named as Haik, a Tagalog sea god. On the same year, the world's largest caldera was named as the Apolaki Caldera, after the god of sun in various indigenous religions in Luzon. In 2021, three bridges in Albay were named after three heroes from the Bicolano religious epic, Ibalon, namely Baltog, Handyong, and Bantog. In 2024, UNESCO inscribed the Hinilawod Epic Chant Recordings into its Asia-Pacific Memory of the World Register.

In accordance to the National Cultural Heritage Act, as enacted in 2010, the Philippine Registry of Cultural Property (PReCUP) was established as the national registry of the Philippine Government used to consolidate in one record all cultural property that are deemed important to the cultural heritage, tangible and intangible, of the Philippines. The registry safeguards a variety of Philippine heritage elements, including oral literature, music, dances, ethnographic materials, and sacred grounds, among many others. The National Integrated Protected Areas System (NIPAS) Law, as enacted in 1992 and expanded in 2018, also protects certain Anitist sacred grounds in the country.

The indigenous Philippine folk religions were widely spread in the archipelago, prior to the arrival of Abrahamic religions. The majority of the people, however, had converted to Christianity due to Spanish colonization from the 16th to the late 19th century, which continued through the 20th century during and after American colonization. During the Philippine Revolution, there were proposals to revive the indigenous Philippine folk religions and make them the national religion, but the proposal did not prosper, as the focus at the time was the war against American colonizers.

The Philippine Statistics Authority notes in the 2020 national census, that 0.23% of the Filipino national population are affiliated with indigenous Philippine folk religions, which they wrote as "tribal religions" in their census. This is an increase from the previous 2010 census which recorded 0.19%. Despite the current number of adherents, many traditions from indigenous Philippine folk religions have been integrated into the local practice of Catholicism and Islam, resulting in "Folk Catholicism" and "Folk Islam". The continued conversion of adherents of the indigenous Philippine folk religions into Abrahamic religions by missionaries is a notable concern, as certain practices and indigenous knowledge continue to be lost because of the conversions.

== See also ==
- Indigenous religious beliefs of the Tagbanwa people
- Indigenous religious beliefs of the Tagalog people
- Diwata
- Folk Christianity
- Gabâ
- List of Memory of the World Documentary Heritage in the Philippines
- List of water deities of Philippines
- Souls in Filipino cultures
- Philippine shamans
- Philippine witches
- Pagtatawas
- Philippine mythology
