= Witchcraft in the Philippines =

Users of black magic in Philippine folklore

Witchcraft (Filipino: pangkukulam) has been present throughout the Philippines even before Spanish colonization, and is associated with indigenous Philippine folk religions, where Philippine shamans, who people come to for healing and rituals, are known to counter the magic of Philippine witches, who people fear. Its practice involves black magic, specifically a malevolent use of sympathetic magic. Today, practices are said to be centered in Siquijor, Cebu, Davao, Talalora, Western Samar, and Sorsogon, where many of the country's faith healers reside. Witchcraft also exists in many of the hinterlands, especially in Cebu and Siquijor; however, witchcraft is known and occurs anywhere in the country.

In the Philippines, witches are said to use black magic and related practices, depending on the ethnic group they are associated with. Witchcraft in the Philippines is completely different from modern Western notions of a "witch", as each ethnic group has their own definition and practices attributed to witches. In the Philippines, witches in the traditional non-Westernized sense are malevolent forces who can be sought after to inflict curses on others, although in few instances, they can also bring justice when some injustices occur by way of curses. The curses and other machinations of witches can be lifted by Filipino shamans associated with the indigenous Philippine folk religions. When shamans were demonized by colonizers and followers of the colonial faiths, most shamans were replaced by traditional healers influenced by the Christian or Islamic faiths.

== Terminology ==
Each ethnic group in the Philippines has their own terms for witches. Some of these are as follows:

- Tagalog: mangkukulam, manggagaway
- Waray: aswang, malupad, malakat, mambabarang
- Bisaya: aswang, mambabarang

Filipino ethnic groups have their own specific terms associated with the practice of witchcraft. Some of these include the following:

- Ilocano: gamod, tanem
- Tagalog: kulam, gaway
- Visayan: barang, hiwit, lágà, haplit, paktol, anyaw
- Moro: pantak

== Black magic ==
Filipino witches are believed to have powers that cause harm to other people secretly. Healer-sorcerers who practice this kind of sorcery usually describe it as a form of criminal punishment, as a widespread belief is that black magic does not work on people who are innocent. Their targets are usually "wrongdoers" like thieves, adulterous spouses, or land grabbers. There are also so-called “true” sorcerers who are believed to inherit their supernatural powers through their lineage. Unlike healers, they do not judge the justice of their actions. The latter type of sorcerers are often associated with the evil supernatural beings capable of appearing human, like aswang and manananggal.

One of the most common kind of black magic is a malevolent use of sympathetic magic. This is known by various names like kulam, gaway (Tagalog); barang, hiwit, lágà (Visayan); tanem, tamay (Ilocano); and pantak (Moro). Despite the differences in terminology, the methods is almost similar across the Philippine islands (and indeed, across Southeast Asia). This type of sorcery uses beetles, effigies, poppets, a boiling pot or some other type of representation of the target victim. (Note: The term barang refers to a type of beetle in Visayan. Lágà (sometimes written as la-ga or la-aga) means to brew or to boil [in a pot]. (McClenon, 1985)) These are usually "linked" by including bodily exuviae like hair or nail clippings. These practices are performed through chants, spells, or symbols, which may sometimes be combined with Christian or Muslim rituals.The sorcerer then either harms the effigy to cause similar harm to the victim, or physically "sends" objects into the victim's body (which can range from insects, stones, to needles). In some instances, the ingredients of the ritual themselves determine the effects. For example, adding seawater to a boiling pot "linked" to a victim is said to cause the victim's belly to bloat and ache in time with the tides. This type of sorcery was documented as early as the 17th century by Francisco Combés.

Other malevolent powers are more direct. These include the ability to kill another person instantly with magic spells, the ability to cast curses or the evil eye, the ability to "abduct" a person's soul, or the ability to send evil spirits or familiar animals to possess or harm the victim.

Some of these purportedly sorcerous powers may be explained by the use of poisons (hilo or lason) and sleight of hand. In most cases however, accusations of this type of black magic are often borne out of paranoia, moral panic, or mass hysteria against disliked or mistrusted members of the community, similar to the European witch-hunts. People accused of black magic were often subject to ostracization and in many cases, violence. This was especially true during the Spanish colonial period, where in one instance in the mid-19th century, a Filipino curate ordered the assassination of 57 people he suspected were sorcerers casting evil spells on his sick mother.

Sorcerous "attacks" are most commonly treated with sumbalik (counter-spells or antidotes), which are themselves, a form of sorcery and do not usually require interaction with the spirits. They purportedly deflect the effects of the curse and return it to the caster. In extreme cases, sumbalik can kill the caster. Other healing rituals for sorcery are not intended to harm the caster but are believed to evoke their compassion, prompt them to lift the curse.

== Methods ==
Kulam uses beetles, effigies, poppets, a boiling pot or some other type of representation of the target victim. These are usually "linked" by including bodily exuviae like hair or nail clippings. These are triggered by chants, spells, or symbols (sometimes syncretized with Christian or Muslim rituals). The sorcerer then either harms the effigy to cause corresponding harm to the victim, or physically "sends" objects into the victim's body (which can range from insects, stones, to pins). Earth (soil), fire, herbs, spices, candles, oils and kitchenware and utensils are commonly used for rituals, charms, spells and potions. In some instances, the ingredients of the ritual themselves determine the effects. For example, adding seawater to a boiling pot "connected" to a victim is said to cause the victim's belly to swell and ache in time with the tides. This type of sorcery was documented as early as the 17th century by Francisco Combés. Barang (the term barang refers to a type of beetle in Visayan) usually employs a swarm of destructive insects, specifically carnivorous beetles. Other techniques are usik (sharp magic, or induced illnesses using smaller insects), hilo and lason (poison magic), paktol (doll magic, using skulls or representations of the victim), laga (boiling magic, Lágà sometimes written as la-ga or la-aga, means to brew or to boil [in a pot]), and sampal (sea creature magic). Other malevolent powers are more direct. These include the ability to harm another person instantly with magic spells, the ability to cast curses or the evil eye, the ability to "abduct" a person's soul, or the ability to send evil spirits or familiar animals to possess or injure the victim.

== Practitioners ==
There are various names for sorcerers in Philippine ethnic groups. Most of these names have negative connotations, and thus is also translated to "witch" or "hag" in English sources. These witches encompass a wide range of individuals who may differ considerably in terms of their occupations, social roles, practices, and cultural associations. Their identities and the ways in which they are viewed can differ depending on the specific ethnic group, community, or cultural tradition with which they are associated. As a result, the concept of a witch is not necessarily consistent across different groups, as each community may have its own beliefs, interpretations, and characteristics ascribed to these individuals. They are completely different from the Western notion of what a witch is. They include Bikol: parakaraw; Ilocano: managtanem, managinulod, mannamay; Ivatan: mamkaw, manulib; Kapampangan: mangkukusim (or mangkukusino); Pangasinan: manananem, mangngibawanen; Tagalog: mangkukulam, manggagaway, may-galing, hukluban (or hukloban); Visayan: dalagangan, dunganon, dalongdongan, busalian, mambabarang (or mamamarang, mamalarang, barangan), usikan (or osikan), paktolan, sigbinan, manughiwit, mamumuyag, mang-aawog (or mang-aawug, mang-aaug), Hiligaynon: manog hiwit. Other terms are the Spanish brujo and bruja (masculine and feminine forms of "witch"; Filipinized as bruho and bruha).

=== Aswang ===
The Aswang, vampire-like supernatural entities, are sometimes considered a type of witch since they can start out as an ordinary person. They have strong powers of sorcery (particularly shape-shifting) that they need to maintain by feeding on humans. They are also called ongo, kaskas, balbal, wakwak, manananggal, kikik, etc., depending on the form they take or the method of attack they prefer. It is generally believed that an aswang can not be born to normal parents. They either need to have an aswang parent or gain their curse through transference called salab. Depending on local beliefs, this can involve an aswang merely looking at a victim, contaminating the food of the victim with secretions, or by directly transferring their powers through touch on their deathbed.

=== Mangkukulam ===
A mangkukulam can be considered a Filipino witch, literally meaning "a practitioner of kulam". A curse is called a sumpâ (/soom-PA/), which can also be translated as a "vow" or "oath" and "curse". A mangkukulam may use a voodoo doll and a needle to cast spells on people they want to take revenge on, but largely use natural magic and superstitions similar to an arbularyo, or witch doctor. Both can be considered witches, but the main difference is that the arbularyo is more of a doctor who heals people, while a mangkukulam is a malicious person who tricks and curses others. The primary methods employed by a mangkukulam are candle lighting rituals, scrying or tawas, recitation of spells, and concocting potions. Healer-sorcerers who practice Kulam usually justify it as a form of criminal punishment, as a common belief is that black magic does not work on people who are innocent. Their targets are usually "wrongdoers" like thieves, adulterous spouses, or land grabbers. There are also "true" sorcerers who are said to have hereditary sorcerous powers. Unlike healers, they do not consider the justice of their actions. The latter type of sorcerers are often conflated with the evil supernatural beings capable of appearing human, like aswang and manananggal. Modern popular culture also depicts the mangkukulam as using either photographs or the equivalent of a Voodoo doll. Modern popular culture also depicts mangkukulam as primarily doing only love potions and malicious curses, but more extreme depictions claim they can summon ghosts to haunt dolls, raise the dead (or at least control dead bodies), and other things related to necromancy.

=== Mambabarang ===
The Mambabarang is the Bisayan version of a sorcerer/sorceress, who uses insects and spirits to enter the body of any person they hate. Mambabarang are ordinary human beings with black magic who torture and later kill their victims by infesting their bodies with insects. They are different from mangkukulams, who only inflict pain or illness. Mambabarang serve a strand of hair from their chosen victim and tie it to the bugs or worms which they will use as a medium. When they prick the bug, the victim immediately experiences the intended effect. The name is derived from the word barang. In legends the mambabarang keeps his swarm of carnivorous beetles in a bottle or a section of bamboo, carefully feeding them ginger root. When the practitioner decides to employ his dark art, he performs a prayer ritual wherein he whispers instructions and identifies the victim to the beetles. The destructive insects are then set free and to seek out the victim and gain entry into the body via any bodily orifice: the nose, mouth, ears, anus or dermal breaks such as open sores/wounds. The victim will then feel the effects of the invasion of the insects through manifestations depending on the area of entry; hemorrhoids if through the anus, ear ache if through the ears and other similar cases. The resulting illness is supposedly resistant to conventional medical treatment and only reveals its true nature when the victim succumbs and flying insects issue forth from bodily cavities. In reality, it is possible a carnivorous beetle could lay eggs in someone it killed, and the eggs would then hatch post-mortem.

=== Usikan ===
The Usikan, also known as the Buyagan, is a type of Visayan sorcerer that can inflict harm through words (buyag). They can affect not only people, but also plants, animals, and inanimate objects. They cause harm by complimenting someone or something, either unwittingly or with malevolent intent. To protect against this, people carefully avoid accepting compliments from strangers and may say the phrase "pwera buyag" (from Spanish fuera buyag) immediately after giving a compliment or receiving one. Various beliefs hold that the Usikan can be recognized by having a dark tongue or by being born with teeth. Unlike the other types of "witches", the power of the Usikan is innate, and is not acquired by choice. Nor are they innately malevolent, and in most cases, they are believed to be unaware that they possess the power.

== Remedies ==
A common belief of kulam is that curses are mitigated by finding the caster and bribing him or her to lift the curse. Some people who believe in superstitions still attribute certain illnesses or diseases to "kulam". This most often happens in rural areas, where an herbal doctor called an Albularyo, diagnoses a victim using a divination method called Pagtatawas and helps the victim cure his or her malady. Superstitious folks still attribute certain illnesses or diseases to barang. This most often happens in the provinces, where an herbal doctor, albularyo or a faith healer, a mananambal or sorhuana (female) / sorhuano (male) treats such diseases. In some rural provincial areas, people entirely depend on the albularyo and mananambal for treatment. In most cases, a healer is also a sorcerer. In order to cure or counteract sorcerous illnesses, healers must themselves know sorcery. This relationship is most evident in Siquijor Island, where healer-sorcerers are still common. The mananambal specialize in countering barang. As spiritual mediums and divinators, Filipino shamans are notable for countering and preventing the curses and powers of witches, notably through the usage of special items and chants.

Sorcerous "attacks" are most commonly treated with sumbalik (counter-spells or antidotes), which are themselves, a form of sorcery and do not usually require interaction with the spirits. They are believed to repel the effects of the curse and send it back to the person who cast it. In extreme cases, sumbalik can kill the caster. Other healing rituals against sorcery do not harm the caster, but instead supposedly moves them to pity and thus revoke the curse. Illnesses believed to be caused by sorcery are treated with counter-spells, simple antidotes, and physical healing. Darker forms of remedies to kulam include Albularyos whipping the bewitched person with a Buntot Pagi (Stingray's Tail) until the afflicted is forced to divulge the witch's name and confronting him or her. This is done in the belief that the one who is getting hurt is the witch and not the bewitched.

== See also ==
- Asian witchcraft
- Filipino shamans
- Gabâ or gabaa, the Cebuano concept of negative karma
