= Asian witchcraft =

Various types of witchcraft practices across Asia

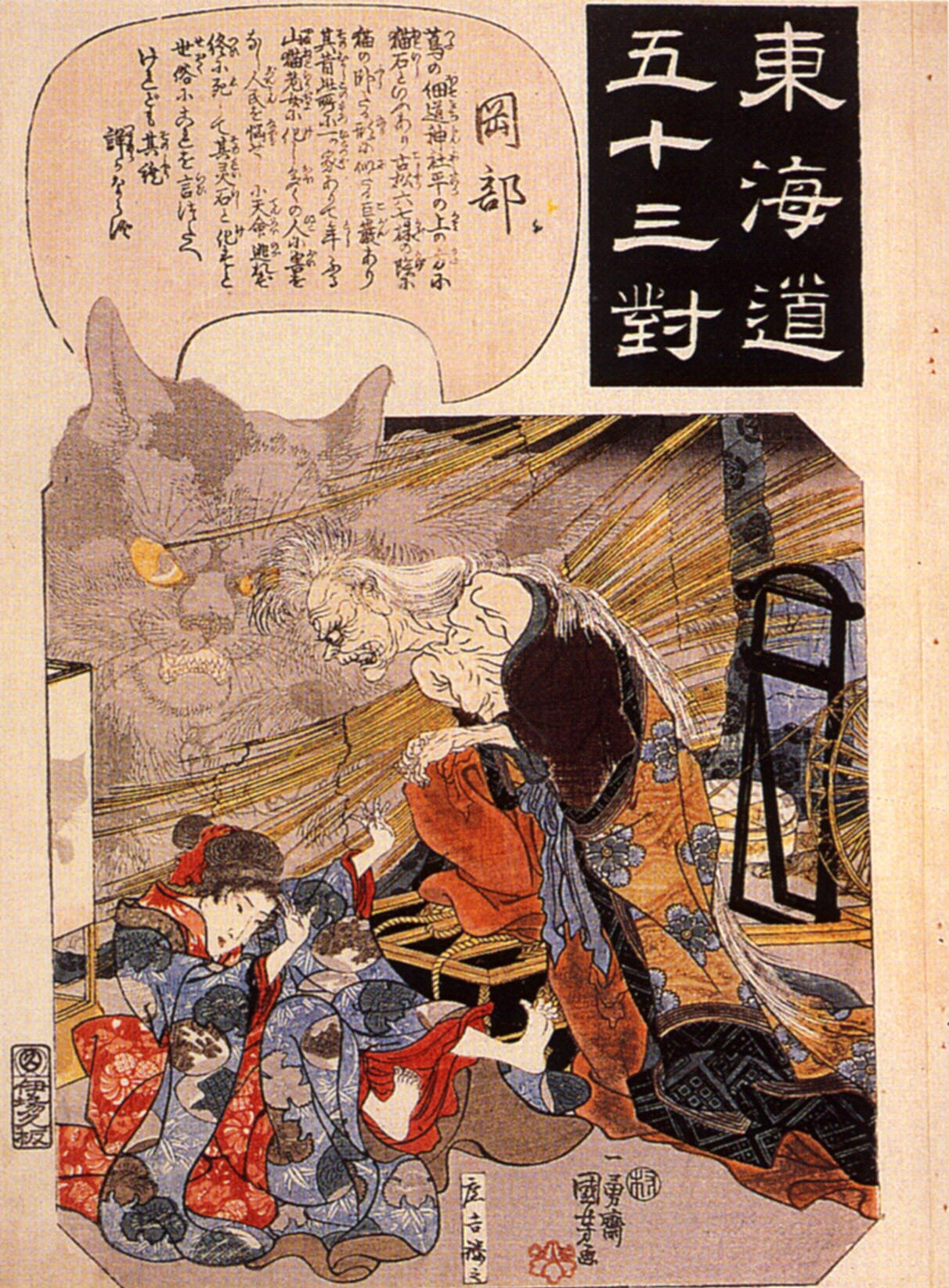
Okabe – The cat witch, by Utagawa Kuniyoshi

Asian witchcraft encompasses various types of witchcraft practices across Asia. In ancient times, magic played a significant role in societies such as ancient Egypt and Babylonia, as evidenced by historical records. In the Middle East, references to magic can be found in the Torah, Bible and the Quran, where witchcraft is condemned due to its association with belief in magic.

In India and Nepal, there has been cases of witch-hunting and abuse of women accused of witchcraft, including recently. Legal reforms are needed to prevent these acts of violence and marginalization against those accused of witchcraft.

East Asia has diverse witchcraft traditions. In Chinese culture, the practice of Gong Tau involves black magic for purposes such as revenge and personal gain. Japanese folklore features witch figures who employ foxes as familiars. Korean history includes instances of individuals being condemned for using spells. The Philippines has its own tradition of witches, distinct from Western portrayals, with their practices often countered by indigenous shamans.

== West Asia ==
Witchcraft in West Asia has a complex history influenced by cultural, spiritual, and societal factors. Ancient practices were evident in societies like Egypt and Babylonia, as seen in the Code of Hammurabi. Within Abrahamic religions, attitudes varied: Judaism had a mixed view of magic, Christianity condemned it, and Islam encompassed a range of perspectives. This evolving landscape reflects the interplay between cultural beliefs and societal norms, shaping the enduring presence of witchcraft in the region's history.

== South Asia ==
In certain parts of India and Nepal, belief in the supernatural has led to instances of witch-hunting and abuse against women accused of witchcraft. Lynchings and murders of suspected witches, known as "dayan" in India, have been reported, with at least 2100 such murders between 2000 and 2012. In Nepal, accusations of witchcraft result in severe abuse, beatings, and forced consumption of human excreta. Women marked as witches often endure mental and physical torture, leading to ostracization, emotional trauma, and even death. Outdated customs and superstitious beliefs perpetuate this cycle, limiting accused women's access to education and opportunities. The legal systems in both countries have not adequately addressed these issues, leaving the victims without proper protection or justice against these atrocities.

=== India ===
In 19th-century India, Christian missionaries, especially Jesuit missions, defined the term "witchcraft" as any involvement in non-Christian spiritual activities. David Mosse observed that:

Parishioners discovered attending pagan dramas, [...] or engaging in Hindu practices or "witchcraft" of other kinds were publicly humiliated, having to wear a crown of thorns during Mass, or to go around the church on their knees; [...] When misfortune struck, priests were ready to explain this as retribution for engagement in the "abominable villainy and deceit" of witchcraft—broadly taken as any non-Christian meditation.

Belief in the supernatural is strong in certain parts of India, and lynchings for witchcraft are reported in the press from time to time. According to the Indian National Crime Records Bureau, at least 2100 suspected witches (known as dayan) were murdered between 2000 and 2012. It is believed that an average of over 150 women per year are killed accused of being witches, concentrated across central India. Murder is commonly carried out by means of being burned, hacked or bludgeoned to death, often preceded by ritual humiliation, such as being stripped naked, smeared with filth and forced to eat excrement. For those accused of witchcraft who are not murdered, nearly all suffer permanent ostracism or banishment and their families face social stigma.

=== Himalayas ===
The influence of Buddhism on shamanism and witchcraft in the Himalayas has been profound, leading to complex interactions and adaptations. As Buddhism spread through the region, it often absorbed and integrated elements of local shamanistic and witchcraft practices. Many aspects of indigenous spiritual beliefs were harmonized with Buddhist teachings, resulting in syncretic practices that combined elements of both traditions.

Shamanic practices, which often involved spirit communication and healing rituals, evolved to coexist with Buddhist concepts of compassion and karma. While some shamanic and witchcraft practices persisted, they were often reinterpreted within the framework of Buddhist ethics and cosmology, altering their form and intent. Thus, Buddhism played a transformative role, shaping the syncretic spiritual landscape of the Himalayas, where traditional practices, influenced by Buddhist philosophy, continue to be practiced alongside formal Buddhist teachings.

==== Nepal ====
In Nepal, women are often accused of witchcraft and thus suffer abuse at the hands of people from their own communities. Nepali people view witchcraft as harmful to society and it still exists in most of the country. It is most prevalent in the Terai and hilly rural regions and women here are more vulnerable to abuse. Women of all ages and social statuses can be targeted and once a woman has been deemed a witch, she is treated horribly by society. The witches are called ‘Boksi’ in Nepali language and it is believed that they learn witchcraft from their mothers.

Punishment can range from receiving severe beatings with sticks or other blunt object to being forced to consume human excreta, a common practice in the plains area of Nepal. Women who are accused of witchcraft may be marked with soot on their faces or garlands of shoes around their necks. These traumatized women are forced to endure mental and physical torture that can lead to ostracization, emotional disturbance and even death.

In Terhathum, there is a rock called ‘boksimara’ which translates to “witch killer stone”. It is said that 200 years ago, accused women were taken to boksimara to be hanged from its precipice. To this day, these types of outdated customs and traditions continue to be prevalent among various castes and tribes. Laxmi Maya Nepali, a victim and inhabitant of Shrijung Village Development committee from Terhathum expresses her pain of being accused of being a witch:

I had to stay alone in an old house, it was difficult to move around for me, people used to call me witch; even my own relatives did not let me stay at home accusing me of being a witch. One of my relatives gave birth to a dead baby and they accused me as their baby was dead because of my witchcraft powers. Even my son was badly beaten by his own nephew.

The atrocities that these women face can also prevent them from equal access to education. Without the tools to succeed academically, the accused women are not able to change their societal status. The traditional ways and superstitious beliefs of Nepali culture trap accused women in a vicious cycle. This continues as they are denied opportunities to educate themselves and they are forced to suffer, oftentimes in poverty, for the rest of their lives.

The legal system has done nothing to address the horrors that Nepali women suffer to this day if they are accused of witchcraft. The state has not formulated any concrete law regarding the “crime of witchcraft”. The Nepali legal system also does not have provisions to punish individuals who have been involved in witch-hunts. If an individual has a complaint filed against them and they are found guilty, they are only imprisoned for a short period of time and may walk away with a fine. Section 10 of Muluki Ain or the National Civil Code states that if a person makes an accusation of witchcraft, they shall be jailed for three months to two years or fined five thousand to twenty-five thousand Nepalese Rupees or both. This is the only punishment for those who would commit atrocities against innocent women.

== Southeast Asia ==
=== Philippines ===
In the Philippines, as in many of these cultures, witches are viewed as those opposed to the sacred. Unlike in the West where "witches" referred are modernly viewed as people vilified by a certain social system, in the Philippines, witches are mostly malevolent forces. The more accurate parallel of Western "witches" are the Philippine shamans, who conducted community rituals and healing, and were brutally subjugated by the Spanish colonial government and the Abrahamic religions brought about by colonization. The spells cast by Philippine witches are often countered by Philippine shamans, showcasing a battle between the malevolent and benevolent forces.

The terms for "witch" and "shaman" in the Philippines differ depending on the ethnic group. There are more than 170 ethnic groups in the Philippines, each have their own distinct languages and terminologies. Beliefs on witches and shamans originate from the Indigenous Philippine folk religions. After Spanish colonization, the Catholic clergy partially overtook the role of Philippine shamans and thus became counters to Philippine witches as well, while the Catholic clergy was also committing atrocities against Philippine shamans.

Philippine witches are the users of black magic and related practices from the Philippines. They include a variety of different kinds of people with differing occupations and cultural connotations which depend on the ethnic group they are associated with. They are completely different from the Western notion of what a witch is, as each ethnic group has their own definition and practices attributed to witches. The curses and other magics of witches are often blocked, countered, cured, or lifted by Philippine shamans associated with the Indigenous Philippine folk religions.

During the 1580s in Manila, Philippines, the Spanish wife of the ex-governor (Guido de Labezaris) of the Philippines, Inés Álvarez de Gibraleón and their daughter Ana de Monterrey were put on trial for being accused of witchcraft and black magic. It resulted in two trials, however, due to there being no personal investigations, the ecclesiastical investigation was the result of hearsay. There is a record of this trial in the Archivo General de la Nación in Mexico City. However, the civil trial involving Ana de Monterrey and her husband Captain Juan de Morón disappeared.

Unlike Western notions of witches, indigenous or traditional Filipino witches are not entirely evil by nature, but rather, considered as simply malevolent. Locals may also consult them to initiate a form of criminal punishment through black magic for cases where families feel that an injustice to the victim was not properly taken cared of by prosecutors, leading to the freedom of the accused. There is a widespread belief that black magic does not work on people who are innocent. In these cases, "wrongdoers" may include thieves, adulterous spouses, or land grabbers, among others.

As this type of sorcery is seen as a kind of "justice", especially for people who can not (or failed to) legally prosecute a wrongdoer, it has continued to be in usage for the benefit of the victims of wrongdoers. Many people also consult Philippine shamans through rituals, but Philippine shamans do not attack people using their rituals, as their main role is to heal, purify, and strengthen community bonds, while bridging the human world with the spiritual realm. Because of this, some individuals consult Philippine witches to attack people for reasons concerning the "justice" that those individuals view as fit against certain wrong-doers. In this way, both shamans and witches serve their purpose for the community.

=== Vietnam ===
Witchcraft in Vietnam is a diverse and culturally rich practice deeply intertwined with the country's traditional beliefs and indigenous spirituality. Practiced by individuals known as "thầy bói", "thầy pháp", "thầy phù thủy" (male) or "bà đồng" (female), Vietnamese witchcraft encompasses rituals, divination, healing, and protection. These practices are rooted in animistic beliefs that emphasize connections with spirits and deities to influence various aspects of life. Rituals often involve offerings, divination techniques, and spirit possession by "bà đồng" practitioners who act as vessels for spirits, conveying messages from the spirit world to the living.

== East Asia ==
Japanese folklore prominently features the figure of the fox witch, known for enlisting foxes for magical purposes. These witches strike deals with fox familiars, utilizing their shape-shifting, illusion, and possession abilities. In Korea, the history of shamanism (musok) has been marked by suppression under Confucianism, driven by suspicion of any opposing religion including buddhism and Christianity, where many could suffer punishment if caught. Although ancestral rite practice was prevalent, it was not to be a public affair as family altars were within the home. It wouldn't be until the 19th and 20th century, with the spread of Christianity, that the stigma in modern age still existed, but during the recent age, there are groups who support shamanism and active practitioners. While stigmatized, shamanism has experienced growing acceptance in South Korea, even though some critics still label mudang (shamanic practitioners) as manipulative and disruptive.

=== China ===
In 91 BCE, during the reign of Emperor Wu of Han (141 BCE to 87 BCE) in the Western Han Dynasty of China, members of the imperial court carried out a witch hunt, with the help of shamans.

In modern times, Gong Tau in Hokkien, Teochew, or Cantonese or Jiang Tou in Mandarin is the term used when someone is suspected of having been attacked by black magic and is believed to be a fusion of poison skills which originated in Yunnan, China and witchcraft seen in South East Asia. It is used to either seek revenge, resolve relationship issues or even to assist with money problems.

=== Japan ===
In Japanese folklore the witch can commonly be separated into two categories: those who employ snakes as familiars, and those who employ foxes. The fox witch is, by far, the most commonly seen witch figure in Japan. Differing regional beliefs set those who use foxes into two separate types: the kitsune-mochi, and the tsukimono-suji. The first of these, the kitsune-mochi, is a solitary figure who gains his fox familiar by bribing it with its favourite foods. The kitsune-mochi then strikes up a deal with the fox, typically promising food and daily care in return for the fox's magical services.

The fox of Japanese folklore is a powerful trickster in and of itself, imbued with powers of shape changing, possession, and illusion. These creatures can be either nefarious; disguising themselves as women in order to trap men, or they can be benign forces as in the story of "The Grateful Foxes". However, once a fox enters the employ of a man it almost exclusively becomes a force of evil to be feared. By far, the most commonly reported cases of fox witchcraft in modern Japan are enacted by tsukimono-suji families, or "hereditary witches".

A fox under the employ of a human can provide him with many services. The fox can turn invisible and be set out to find secrets and it still retains its many powers of illusion which its master will often put to use in order to trick his enemies. The most feared power the kitsune-tsukai possesses is his ability to command his fox to possess other humans.

In modern media

Magical girl genre may be the most commonly known to feature witchcraft, but it appears liberally in any works of fiction where such supernatural power can exist, despite the fact that such magic resembles more of western witchcraft than an oriental counterpart. Evil witch antagonists, borne out of the European concept of witch, are popular; however, their powers rarely stem from worshipping devils.

Magical girl animation is typically referred to as mahō shōjo and majokko anime in Japan and the target audience is intended for female prepubescent viewers at first, later this genre of anime gradually shifted to target audience male anime fans. The protagonists of these anime are normal schoolgirls who suddenly happen across a mystical item that transforms them into super-beings who have magical abilities. Despite the repetitive story lines that are supposed to be aimed at children, the magical girl genre brings attention to the surrounding gender roles and identities. Some argue that the magical girl genre is empowering for young audiences as the characters become superheroes who take down the bad guys. However, other theories accuse the magical girl anime of depicting an abundance of eroticism and violence.

Toei Studio produced the first heroine anime which was also the first magical girl anime, Sally the Witch. The settings and character elements were heavily borrowed from many live-action television programs which included the American comedy, Bewitched. While the concept of witches waned in the United States, the symbolism of magic and witchcraft translated well into Japanese culture.

=== Korea ===
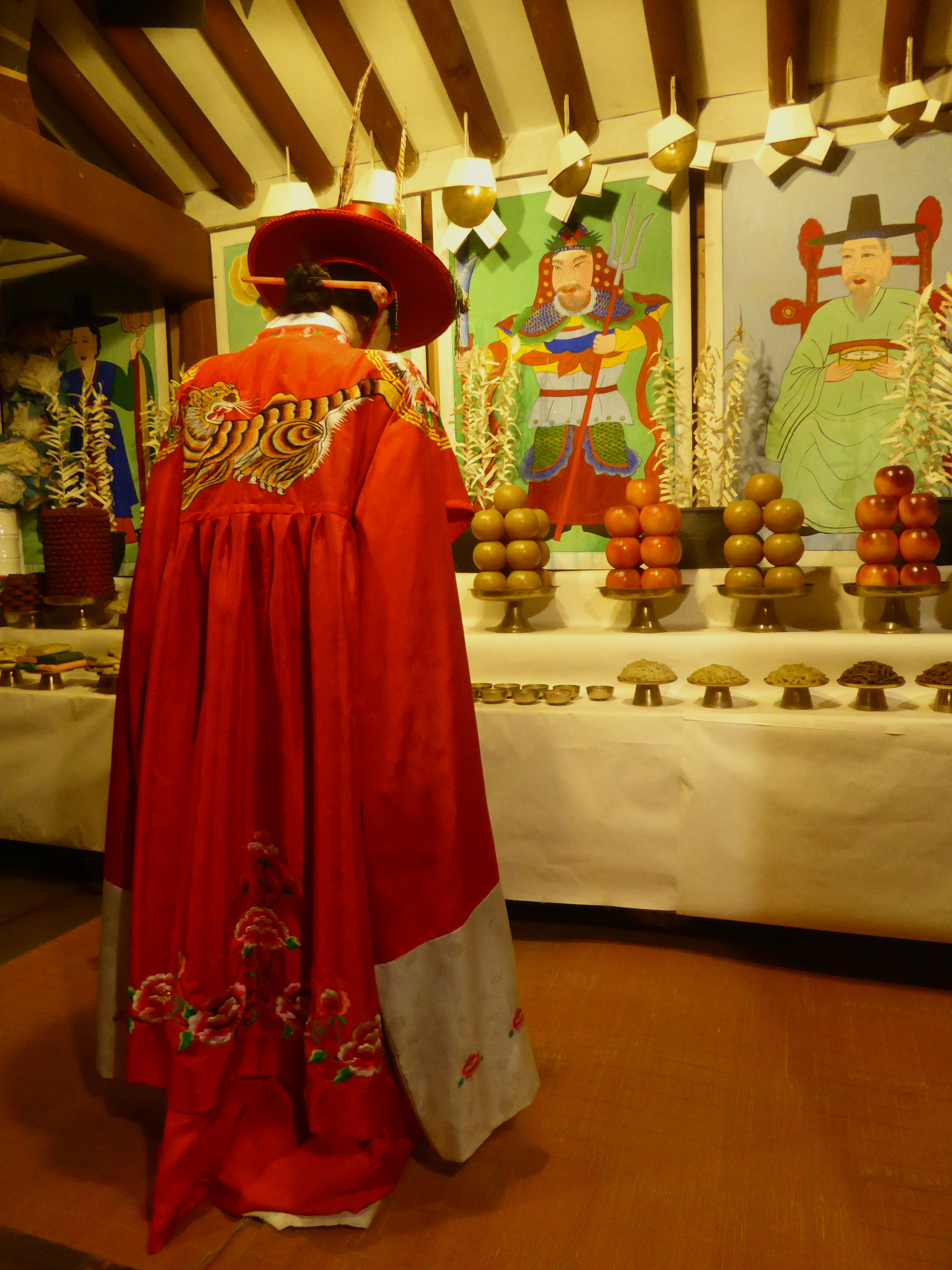
A diorama of a mudang worshipping at a shrine at the Lotte World Folk Museum in Seoul

Korean shamanism or Mu-ism is a religion from Korea. It is also called musok (무속; 巫俗) in Korean. Scholars of religion have classified it as a folk religion. There is no central authority in control of the religion and much diversity exists among practitioners. Female practitioners are sometimes referred to as "witches".

Musok has been suppressed throughout Korean history under a succession of dominant ideologies including Confucianism, Japanese colonialism, and Christianity. Attempting to influence others through spells in Joseon was widely censured by the royal court. On discovering that Consort Hwi-bin Kim had used witchcraft on the crown prince, Sejong the Great (1397–1450) described her as a "sorcerer" or "evil monster" (Hanja: 妖邪: "sorcery; witchcraft") and had her thrown out of the palace.

In 1890, Horace G. Underwood, an American Presbyterian missionary, defined the Korean translation of the English word "witch" as "mudang" in his English-Korean Dictionary. French Catholic missionaries also equated musok ceremonies with Western witchcraft, in the same way that Christian missionaries rejected magic in other mission fields. Confucian yangban elites also considered musok to be witchcraft.

Many Korean intellectuals eager for modernisation came to regard it as a superstitious practice that should be eradicated. They increasingly referred to it with the term misin ("superstition"). These ideas were endorsed in The Independent, Korea's first vernacular newspaper published between 1896 and 1899. Many of these intellectuals were Christian, thus regarding the mudang's spirits as evil demons. In 1896, police launched a crackdown by arresting mudang, destroying shrines, and burning paraphernalia.

At the start of the 21st century, the mudang remained widely stigmatized in South Korean society, facing widespread prejudice. In 2021, Sarfati observed that while the religion was "still stigmatized," it was experiencing "growing acceptance" in South Korea. The religion's critics often regard mudang as swindlers, people who manipulate the gullible. Critics regularly focus their critique on the large sums of money that the mudang charge, and maintain that the expenses required for its rituals are wasteful. Critics have also accused mudang of disrupting the civil order with their rituals.

Kendall noted that there was a "generally adversarial relationship" between mudang and Protestants in South Korea, the latter regarding musok as "Devil worship". Mainline Protestant theologians have sometimes blamed musok for predisposing Koreans to Pentecostalism and the idea that prayer can generate financial reward. Christians have sometimes harassed mudang at their places of work or during their ceremonies, which some mudang regard as religious discrimination.

== See also ==
- Buddhism in Buryatia
- Charnel ground – Above-ground location for disposal of the dead
- Chöd – Buddhist religious practice

- §Practitioners as 'mad saints'

- Dakini – Sacred female spirit in Hinduism and Buddhism

- §As demonesses
- §As flesh-eaters

- Oriental Witches – Japanese volleyball team
- Roma witchcraft – Belief in witchcraft in Europe
- Shamanism in Siberia – Indigenous religions in Siberia
- Shmashana – Hindu cremation ground

- §Spiritual role
