= Buntot Pagi =

Filipino whiplike weapon

Buntot pagi or stingray tail is a type of Filipino whiplike weapon. It is most known for fighting and warding off aswangs and other similar mythical creatures in Philippine folklore. In actual combat, a Buntot Pagi is often used with a balaraw or a short knife or sword. The weapon is also used in dambana practices as a form of curse deflector.

== See also ==
- Baston
- Sjambok
