= Gabâ =

Negative karma concept in the central Philippines

Gabà (Cebuano: /ˈgabaʔ/) or gabaa, for the people in many parts of the Philippines particularly among Visayans, is the concept of a non-human and non-divine, imminent retribution. A sort of negative karma, it is generally seen as an evil effect on a person because of their wrongdoings or transgressions. The word has later been recycled for translating "divine retribution" or "divine fury" in the translations of the Bible to many local languages in the Philippines. It is also translated as nemesis. The opposite of gaba is grasya, literally grace and from Spanish gracia, which pertains to blessings from Heaven. The English word which is closest to or best describes the word gabà is comeuppance.

== Background ==
Gabà can be characterized through various Cebuano proverbs:

- Its effects are not always experienced immediately, as gabà may take time before its consequences become apparent.
- It may come unexpectedly. (Ang gabà dili magsaba.)
- It is not limited to transgressions against fellow human beings: objects considered holy can also cause gabà, such as dropping on the ground a sacred root crop of taro or ubi. (The concept was later extended to religious icons such as bibles or rosaries). Even the least-valued object may cause it. (Bisan ang ubi makagabâ.)
- It could happen to persons who are important to the transgressor. For instance, people might describe a womanizing father as “gigabáàn” when his daughter gives birth to a child outside of marriage.

=== Sources ===
The concept of gabà is not believed to come from a particular god, God, or an absolute karmic principle. Instead, it is understood as a consequence associated with the spirits of nature, reflecting the belief that supernatural forces within the natural world can respond to human actions and behavior.. It must have arisen out of the animism of pre-Spanish Cebuanos. With the coming of Christianity into the Islands, gabà became "absorbed" in the Roman Catholic Church. In-depth examination, however, would show that it is incompatible with Catholic dogma.

=== Applications ===
==== Gabà and panghimaráòt ====
Gabà is distinct from panghimaráòt or túnglo (curse) whereby a transgressed person pronounces a maldisyon against the transgressor. In panghimaráòt, evil is asked to befall on the sinner; with gabà, evil is sure to befall on the sinner, even if it is not asked. Sometimes Cebuanos blurt out threats of gabà, "Gabáàn ka gyod!", but it is not taken to mean that gabà is being asked; it is only a reminder to the transgressor that no one is excluded from it. Sometimes, sinners also seek to be spared by saying in pidgin Spanish, “Puyra gabà!” or “Pwira gabà” (Fuera gabà).

==== Gabà and karma ====
Gabà is not synonymous with the Hindu-Buddhist law of karma: gabà is only in the negative (a punishment), unlike karma which may be good or bad. Both concepts are recognized among Visayan peoples, although gabà is regarded as distinctly indigenous, whereas karma was introduced from outside the culture.

Gabà and divine retribution

Gabà is not, strictly speaking, the same as punishment from a godhead, such as the monotheisms' God or the Greek goddess Nemesis: gabà does not presuppose an Ultimate Being.

Ill-doings to one's fellowmen does not alone cause gabà but actions like wasting food, disrespecting elders, abusing animals, desecrating holy places or objects, cursing God, and destroying Nuno sa Punso cause gabà as well. An expression also common among the Bisaya and Hiligaynon is purya gabà which is believed to ward off evil when one walks in an eerie place.

=== Social effects ===
Some sociologists believe that gabà is one of the causes of the complacency of Cebuanos: because of their belief in it, they prefer to be silent on abuses. It gives hope to the oppressed that someday the abuses will be punished.

== In popular culture ==
The concept of gabà features prominently in the 2022 Irish-Filipino horror film Nocebo, which revolves around a Cebuana Ongo hexing an exploitive European fashion designer in revenge for her daughter's death in a sweatshop fire.

== See also ==
- Anito
- Karma in Buddhism
- Philippine mythology
