= List of superstitions =

List of articles about superstitions

A superstition is "a belief or practice resulting from ignorance, fear of the unknown, trust in magic or chance, or a false conception of causation" or "an irrational abject attitude of mind toward the supernatural, nature, or God resulting from superstition." Often, it arises from ignorance, a misunderstanding of science or causality, a belief in fate or magic, or fear of that which is unknown. It is commonly applied to beliefs and practices surrounding luck, prophecy, and certain spiritual beings, particularly the belief that future events can be foretold by specific (apparently) unrelated prior events. The word superstition is often used to refer to a religion not practiced by the majority of a given society regardless of whether the prevailing religion contains alleged superstitions.

Superstitions, while often dismissed as irrational, serve a psychological and social function. They can provide comfort or a sense of control in uncertain situations—athletes wearing “lucky” items before games, for instance, or students using rituals before exams. In many cultures, superstitions are intertwined with traditions and collective identity, passed down through generations as a way to interpret events beyond human understanding. Despite advances in science and education, such beliefs persist, suggesting that the need for meaning and reassurance may be as powerful as the desire for empirical truth.

== Global ==
- Chain letter
- Exorcism
- Exorcism in Christianity
- Exorcism in Islam
- List of lucky symbols
- List of unlucky symbols
- Superstitions in Muslim societies
- Superstition in Judaism
- Sailors' superstitions
- Sports-related curses
- Theatrical superstitions

== Number related ==
- Number of the Beast
- 11:11
- 4
- Four-leaf clover
- 7
- Seventh son of a seventh son
- 8
- 9
- 13
- Friday the 13th
- The Thirteen Club
- Thirteenth floor
- 108
- 111
- 666 (Number of the Beast)
- Ace of spades
- Tetraphobia
- Triskaidekaphobia
- 27 Club

== Africa ==
- Buda
- Gris-gris
- Sampy
- Sleeping child

== Americas ==
- Ascalapha odorata
- Carranca
- Curupira
- Djucu
- Fortune cookie
- Knocking on wood
- Spilling salt
- White lighter myth
- Witch window

== Asia ==
=== India, Pakistan, and Bangladesh ===
- Bhoot (ghost)
- Chashme Baddoor
- Chhaupadi
- Churel
- Dhat syndrome
- Ghosts in Bengali culture
- Hindu milk miracle
- Jackal's horn
- Miracle Chapati
- Muhurta
- Mumbai sweet seawater incident
- Navaratna
- Nazar battu
- Pichal Peri
- Puppy pregnancy syndrome
- Sati
- Child marriage in India
- Hook swinging
- Fire-walking
- Infanticide in India
- Meriah sacrifice
- Animal sacrifice in Hinduism
- Omens and Superstitions of Southern India
- Evil eye
- Astrology in India
- Dream interpretation in Hinduism
- Omens in Hinduism
- Votive offerings
- Fire rituals in Hinduism
- Possession (spirit possession in India)
- Exorcism in Christianity and Hinduism in India
- Bhuta (ghost)
- Smallpox goddess cults
- Caste pollution and purity
- Eclipses in Hinduism
- Fetish objects and talismans of India
- Folk healing in India
- Sacred trees in Hinduism
- Village deities of India

=== China ===
- Jin Chan
- Numbers in Chinese culture

=== Japan ===
- Akabeko
- Kanai Anzen
- Maneki-neko
- Okiagari-koboshi
- Omamori

=== Korea ===
- Fan death

=== Philippines ===
- Agimat
- Albularyo
- Barang
- Kulam
- Lihi
- Pagtatawas
- Pasma
- Usog

=== Thailand ===
- Kuman Thong
- Palad khik
- Takrut
- Nang Kwak

=== Other ===
- Russian traditions and superstitions
- Curse of 39
- Superstitions in Sports

== Europe ==
- Barbary macaques in Gibraltar
- Blarney Stone
- Cimaruta
- Cornicello
- Goodman's Croft
- In bocca al lupo
- Kitchen witch
- Knocking on wood
- Nazar
- Painted pebbles
- Rabbit rabbit rabbit
- Ravens of the Tower of London
- Spilling salt
- Spilling water for luck
- Troll cross
- Tycho Brahe days
- Witch post
- Wolfssegen

== See also ==
- Luck
- Omen
- Curse
