= Pagtatawas =

Traditional Filipino divination ritual

Pagtatawas is a divination ritual in pseudomedicine in Filipino psychology (but considered superstition in Western psychology), carried out by the mangtatawas (literally "user of tawas"). It attempts to diagnose an affliction or psychological disorder by interpreting shapes produced in water by heated alum or molten wax droppings from a burning candle. It is thus a form of both carromancy and oryctomancy.

== Technique ==
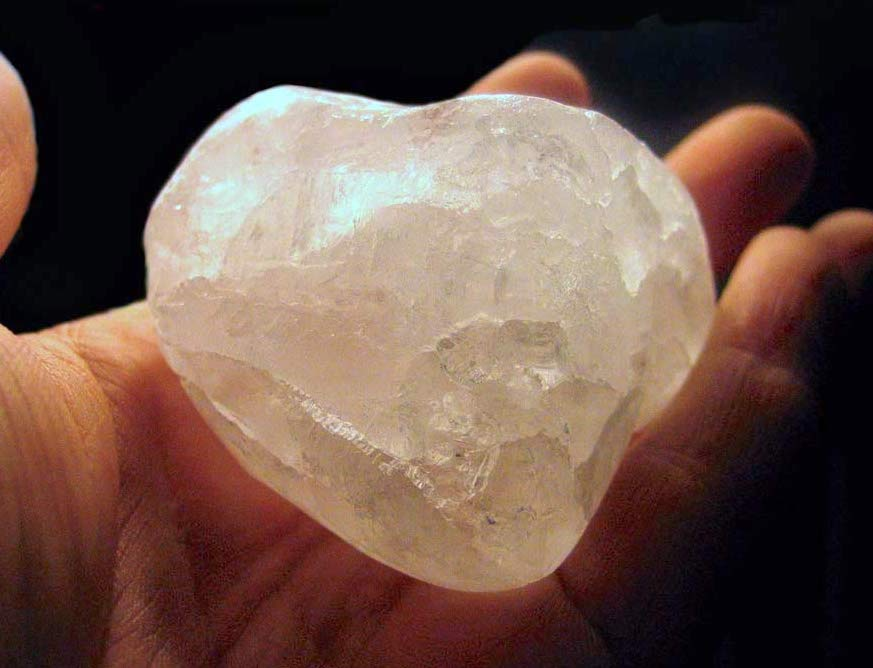
A piece of alum crystal

Earlier and in some rural areas in the Philippines, alum (i.e., hydrated aluminum potassium sulfate or tawas in the vernacular) is ritualistically used by the albularyo or medicine man to pinpoint a variety of health conditions: a child's incessant crying, frequent fatigue, or even failure to conceive.

The tawas is used to trace the sign of the cross on the patient's forehead and other suspicious or ailing parts of the body as prayers are being whispered (bulóng or oración). The alum is then placed on glowing embers, taken when it starts to split, then transferred to a small basin of water. As it cools, the alum's new form spreads on the water's surface and assumes a shape that may suggest the cause of the illness, often one of several indigenous forces: dwarfs, demons, or other malevolent spirits (na-nuno, na-kulam, na-demonyo). The water is then used to anoint the ailing part or parts of the body to counteract the evil forces or illness. The tawas is then discarded and thrown westward, preferably towards the setting sun.

Presently and in most areas, an albularyo simply lights and holds the candle during the ritual. In some, it is the albularyo's assistant or the afflicted person who holds the candle, but almost invariably, it is the albularyo who interprets the vague shapes produced by the wax as it re-solidifies in the basin of water. An albularyo may see supernatural beings displeased as cause of the illness in the shapes and forms, and suggest some cleansing ritual or peace offering to a spirit.

Modern variations have the albularyo use alternative materials for divination, such as eggs, mirrors, blank paper, cigarettes, chewing gum, chicken feathers, and the liver of a freshly-slaughtered chicken or pig (the last one classically known in the West as haruspicy).

== See also ==
- Albularyo, Filipino practitioners of folk medicine
- Kulam, a type of black magic practiced in the Philippines
- Usog, a curse with similarities to the evil eye hex
- Hilot, Filipino folk medicine that uses massages
- Oomancy, practice of divination using eggs
