= Chashme Baddoor =

Chashme Baddoor, Chashme Buddoor, or Chasme Buddoor may refer to:

- Chashme Baddoor (slogan), a slogan used in North India and Pakistan to ward-off the evil eye
- Chashme Buddoor (1981 film), a 1981 Hindi romantic-comedy film
- Chashme Baddoor (2013 film), remake of 1981 film
- Chashme Baddoor (TV series), a Hindi television soap-opera
