= Roman peace =

Roman peace can refer to:

- Pax Romana, a long period of peace in the early years of the Roman Empire.
- Debellatio, the peace which follows a war in which one side is annihilated. "Roman Peace" in this usage refers to the end of the Third Punic War, in which Rome wiped out Carthage and allegedly salted the earth to prevent anything from growing there ever again.
