= FCQ =

FCQ could refer to:

- Fédération de crosse du Québec, governing body of lacrosse in Québec province, Canada
- Food Cravings Questionnaires, self-report questionnaire
