= Nazar (amulet) =

Eye-shaped amulet believed to protect against the evil eye

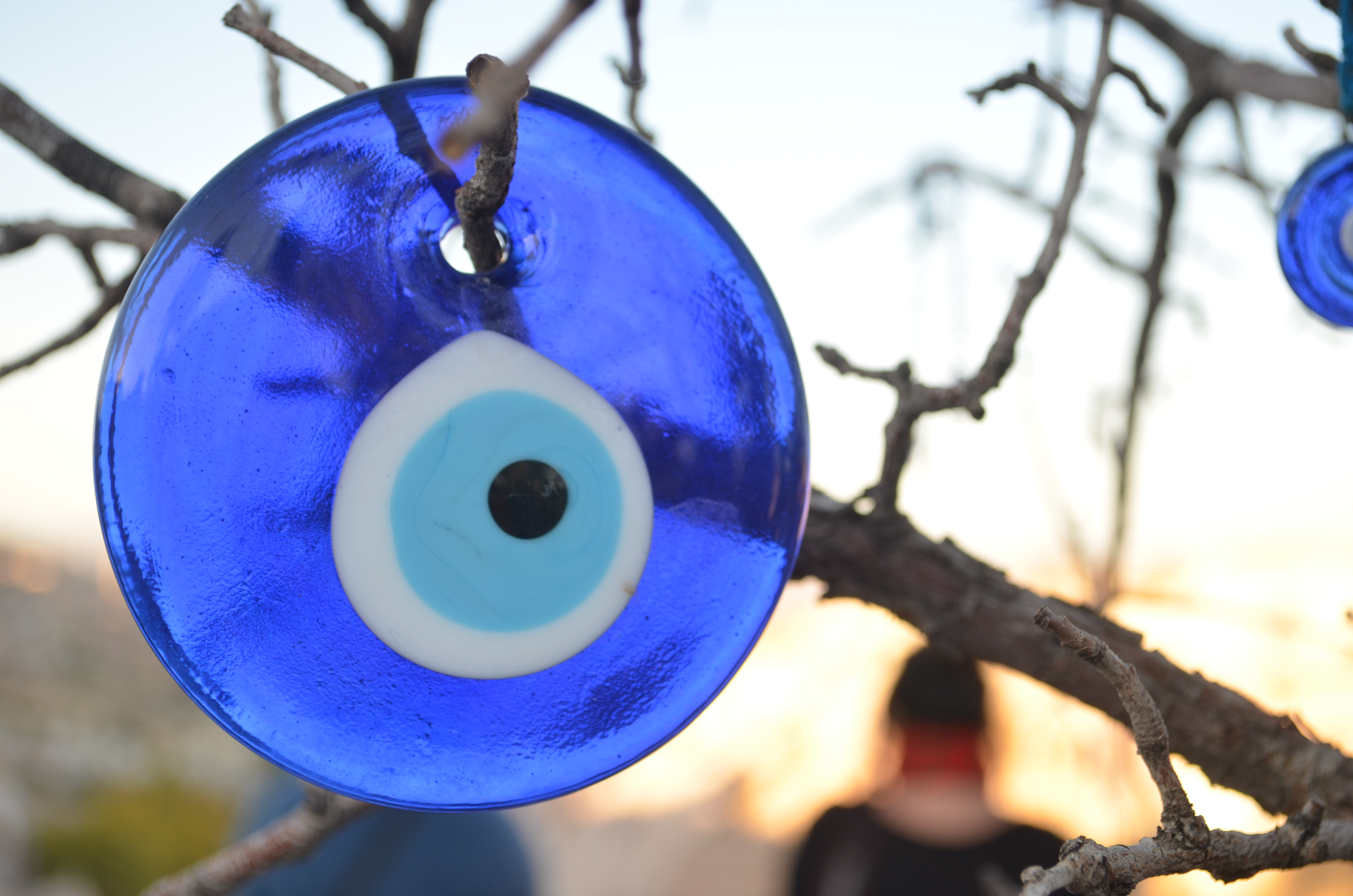
A Turkish nazar boncuğu

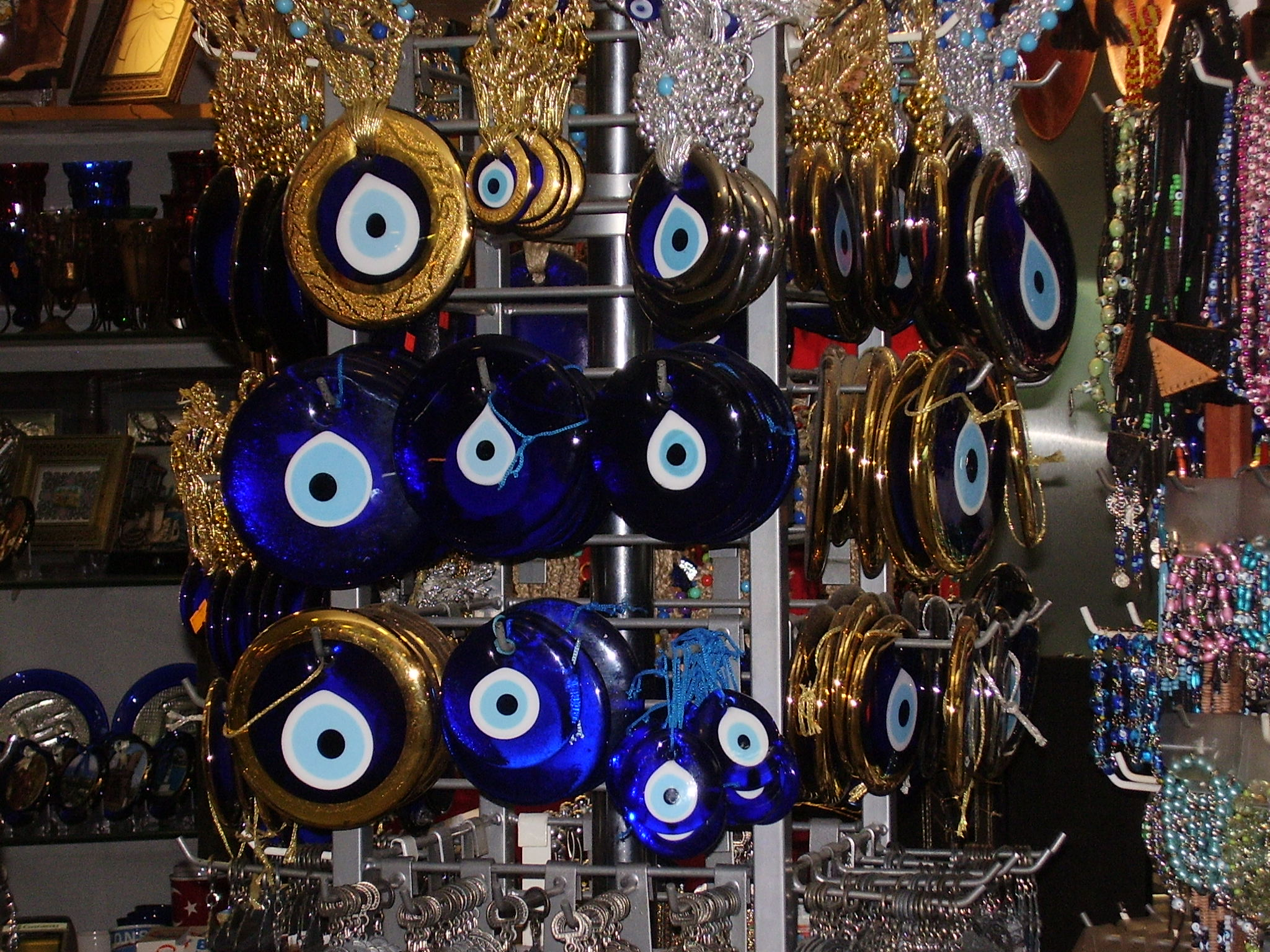
Eye beads or nazars – amulets against the evil eye – for sale in a shop.

A naẓar (from Arabic نَظَر [ˈnaðˤar], meaning 'sight', 'surveillance', 'attention', and other related concepts), or an eye bead, is an eye-shaped amulet believed to protect against the evil eye. The term is also used in Albanian, Azerbaijani, Bengali, Hebrew, Hindi–Urdu, Kurdish, Pashto, Persian, Punjabi, Sindhi, Turkish, and other languages. In Turkey, it is known by the name nazar boncuğu (the latter word being a derivative of boncuk, "bead" in Turkic, and the former borrowed from Arabic), in Greece it is known as máti (μάτι, 'eye'). In Persian and Afghan folklore, it is called a cheshm nazar (Persian: چشم نظر) or nazar qurbāni (نظرقربانی). In India and Pakistan, the Hindi-Urdu slogan chashm-e-baddoor (چشم بدور, '[may the evil] eye keep away') is used to ward off the evil eye. In the Indian subcontinent, the phrase nazar lag gai is used to indicate that one has been affected by the evil eye.

The nazar was added to Unicode as U+1F9FF 🧿 NAZAR AMULET in 2018.

== Amulet ==
A typical nazar is made of handmade glass featuring concentric circles or teardrop shapes in dark blue, white, light blue and black, occasionally with a yellow/gold edge. "The bead is made of a mixture of molten glass, iron, copper, water, and salt, ingredients that are thought to shield people from evil."

"According to Turkic belief, blue acts as a shield against evil and even absorbs negativity." In the Middle East and the Mediterranean, "blue eyes are relatively rare, so the ancients believed that people with light eyes, particularly blue eyes, could curse you with just one look. This belief is so ancient, even the Assyrians had turquoise and blue-eye amulets."

== Eye bead ==
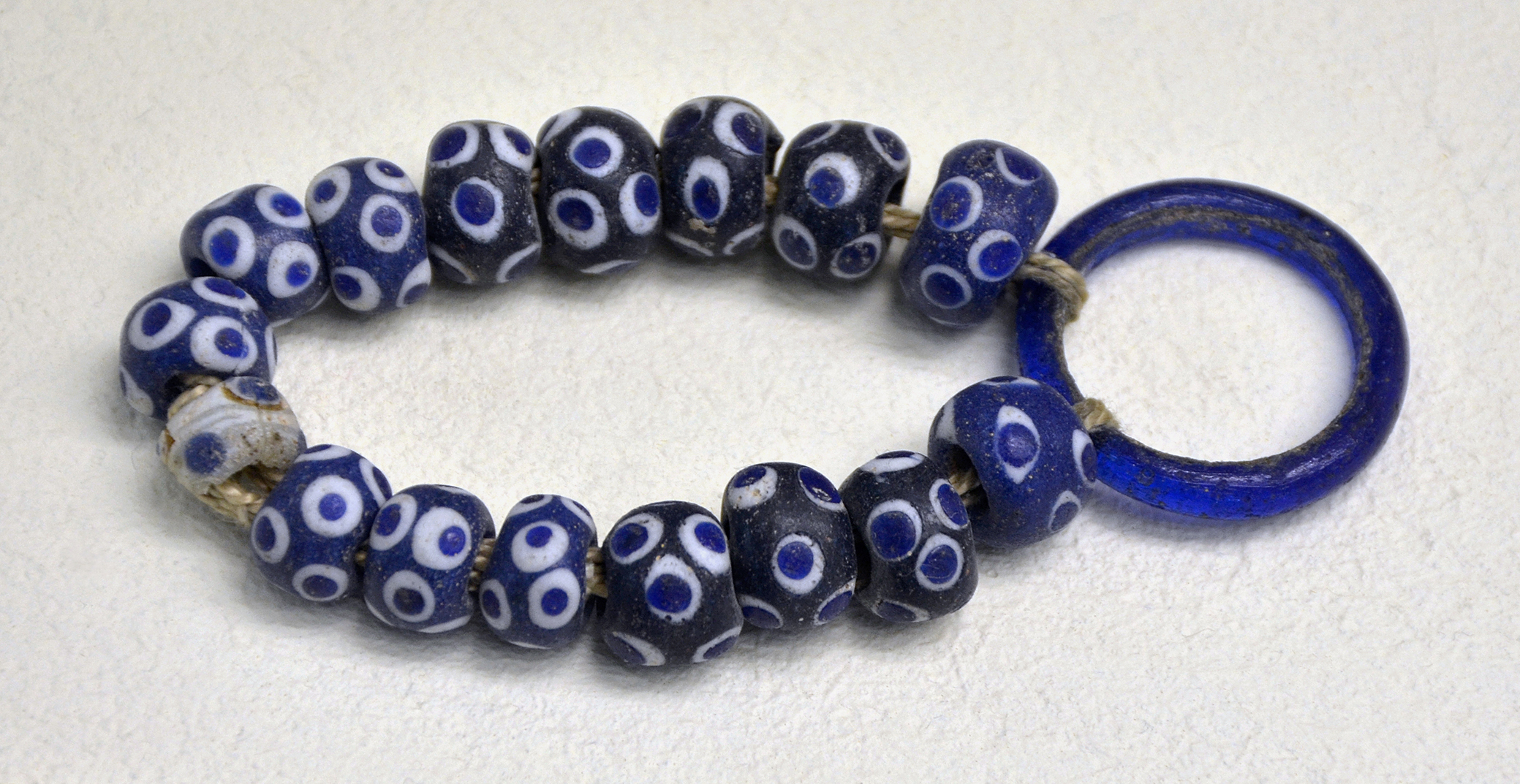
Eye beads

The Turkish boncuk (sometimes called a göz boncuğu or eye bead) is a glass bead characterized by a blue glass filled with a blue white and black dot superimposed on a white or yellow center. A design of great antiquity, the blue bead has gained importance as an item of popular culture in modern Turkey. The bead likely originated in the Mediterranean and is associated with the development of glassmaking. Written documentation and extant beads date from as early as the 16th century BCE. Glass beads were made and widely used throughout the ancient world: from Mesopotamia to Egypt, from Carthage to ancient Greece, from Phoenicia to Persia, and throughout the Roman imperial period.

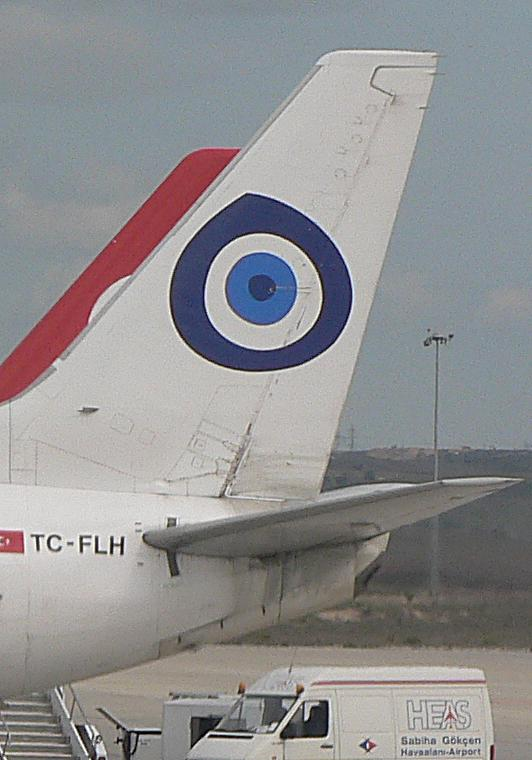
A depiction of a nazar on a Turkish Fly Air airliner.

The mythology behind it says that if one of the beads breaks down, it means a very strong nazar has hit the wearer, and the bead stored it all up and broke down in order to protect them.

== Gallery ==
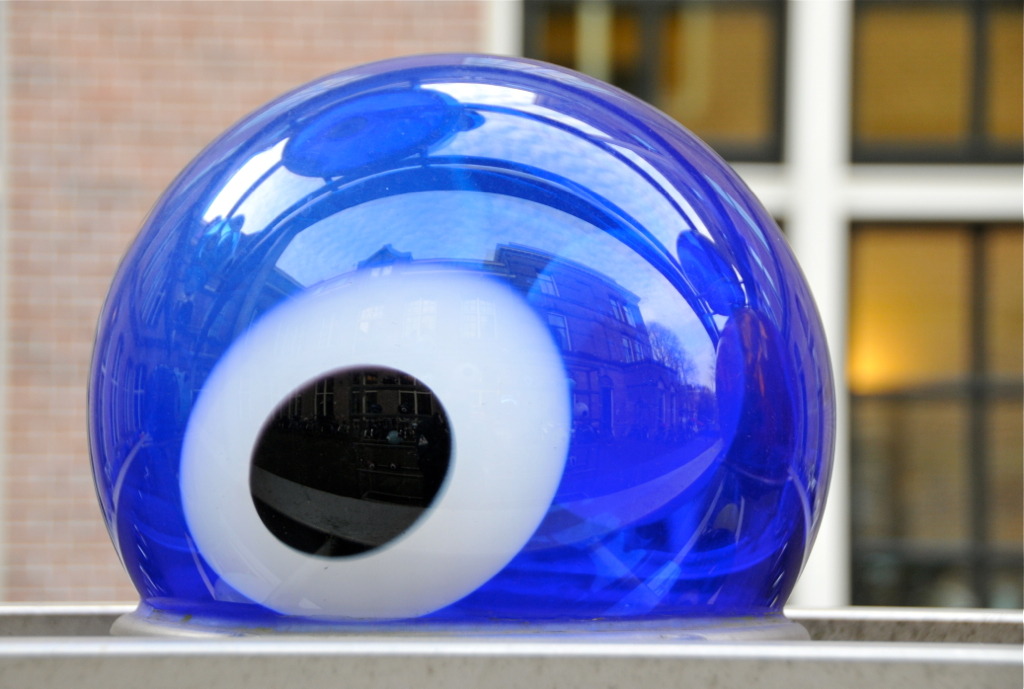
Nazar-inspired sculpture in the Netherlands.

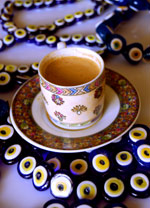
Nazar evil eye charms.

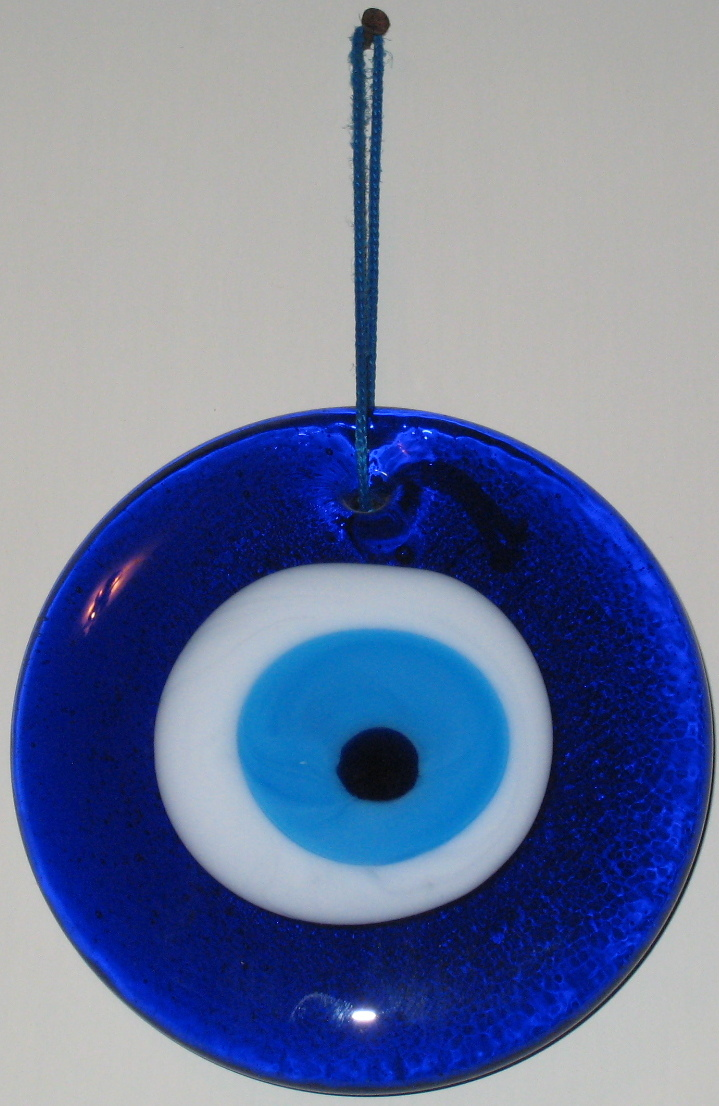
A Persian cheshm nazar.

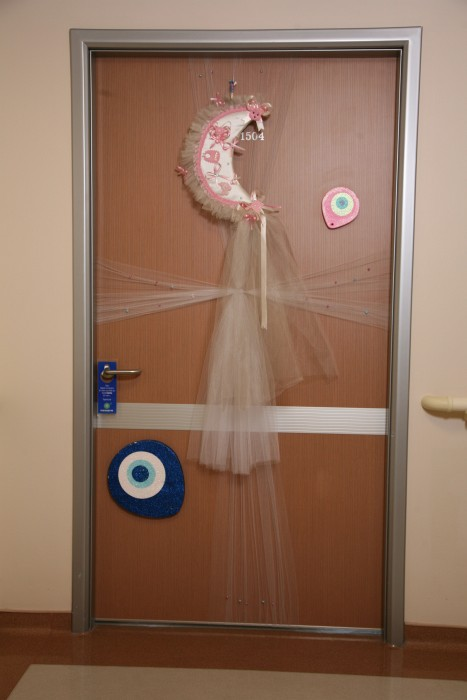
Nazar on a newborn baby's hospital room door in Turkey.

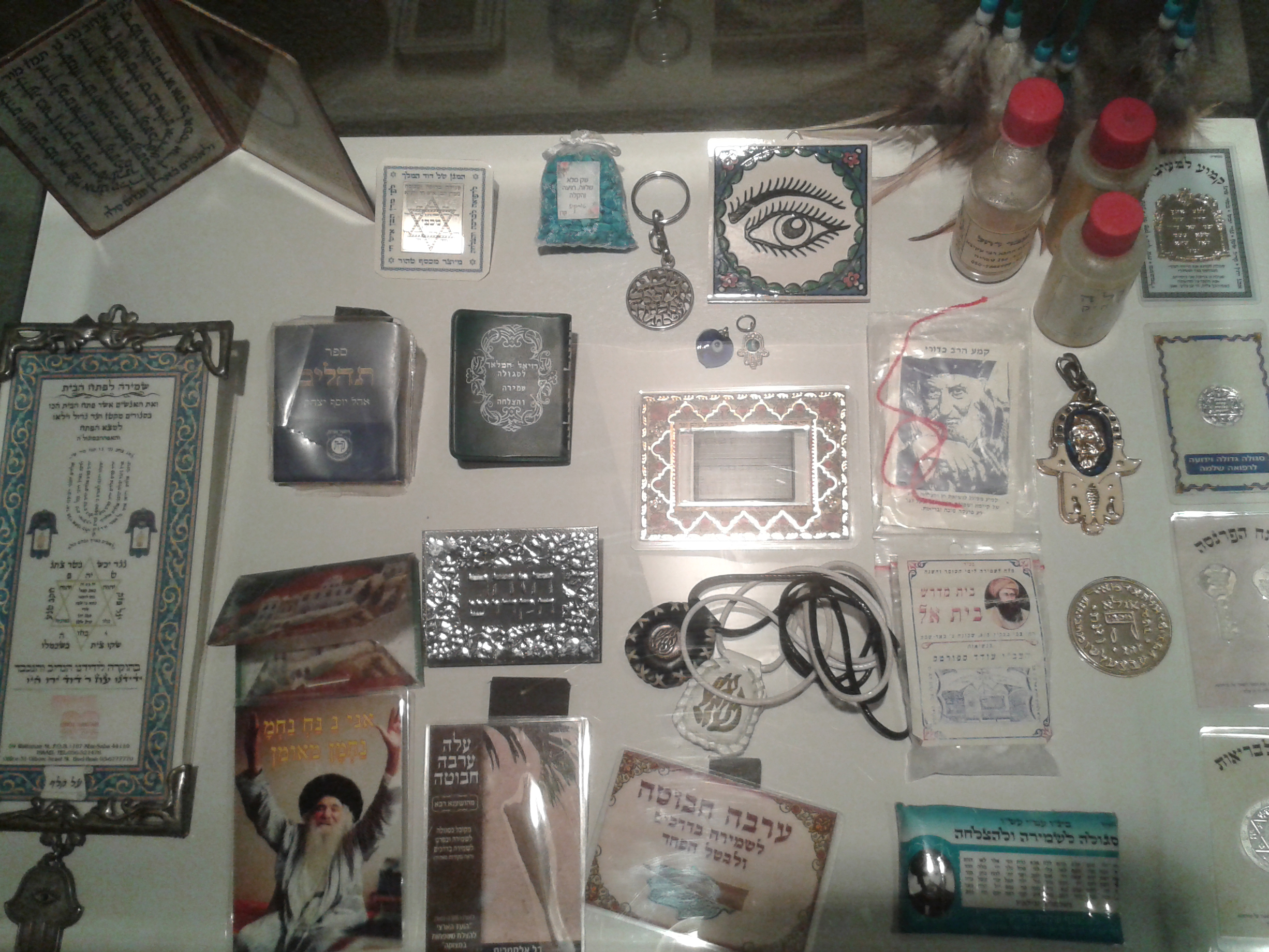
A selection of Jewish amulets, with an ayin mazal visible next to the hamsa.

== See also ==
- Eye of Providence
- God's eye
- Evil eye
- Darśana
- Eyespot (mimicry)
- Görece, Menderes
- Hamsa
- Namkha
- Nazar battu
- Skandola
- Ta'wiz

== Sources ==
- Ronald T. Marchese (2005). The Fabric of Life: Cultural Transformations in Turkish Society. pp. 103–107.
