= Food craving =

Intense desire to consume specific foods

A food craving (also called selective hunger) is an intense desire to consume a specific food, and is different from normal hunger. It may or may not be related to specific hunger, the drive to consume particular nutrients that is well-studied in animals. In studies of food cravings, chocolate and chocolate confectioneries almost always top the list of foods people say they crave; this craving is referred to as chocoholism. The craving of non-food items as food is called pica.

== Causes ==
A food craving is a strong desire to eat a particular type of food. This desire can seem uncontrollable, and the person's hunger may not be satisfied until they get that particular food. Food cravings are common. One research found that 97% of women and 68% of men reported experiencing food cravings.

There is no single explanation for food cravings, and explanations range from low serotonin levels affecting the brain centers for appetite to production of endorphins as a result of consuming fats and carbohydrates. Ghrelin, the "hunger hormone," increases when people skip meals and is often experienced by people who suffer from chronic conditions, both of which impact the appetite signals in the hypothalamus.

People often crave energy-dense foods: chocolate is the most frequently craved food, followed by other sweet and savoury foods which are high in calories. Pineapple is the second most popular food that people have a craving for.

Foods with high levels of sugar glucose, such as chocolate, are more frequently craved than foods with lower sugar glucose, such as broccoli, because when glucose interacts with the opioid receptor system in the brain an addictive triggering effect occurs. The consumer of the glucose feels the urge to consume more glucose, much like an alcoholic, because the brain has become conditioned to release "happy hormones" every time glucose is present. Foods that are easily digestible, deep in richness, and have distinct sweetness and saltiness are referred to as 'hyperpalatable'. These hyperpalatable foods affect the neurons in the nucleus accumbens, the human reward system, causing them to become very active, increasing the levels of pleasure. Hormones like dopamine, leptin, ghrelin, and cortisol are released, as well as insulin due to this stimulation.

Cultural differences have been found, for example, with rice being the most frequently craved food in Japan. Among low-calorie foods, cravings for fruits are common. Food cravings tend to occur in the late afternoon and evening. The desire to eat high-calorie foods increases throughout the day, while craving for fruits decreases.

The aspect of a food craving is multi-dimensional. Physiologically, it is connected with several mechanisms that motivates food seeking and prepares the body for digestion such as increased salivary flow along with activating reward-related brain areas such as the striatum. Cognitive (i.e., thinking about the food) and emotional (e.g., desire to eat or changes in mood) components are also involved. A final behavioural aspect of seeking and consuming the food also occurs. Whilst experiencing a food craving often results in eating the craved food, the craving-consumption relationship also depends on differences within individuals and their current situation.

The cravings for certain types of food are linked to their ingredients. Chocolate for example, contains the neurotransmitter phenylethylamine, which is important for the regulation of the body's release of endorphins and is responsible for the state of mood and pleasure.

In recent years, researchers have focused significantly on perimenstrual cravings for chocolate, resulting in a better understanding of the mechanisms underlying craving aetiology.

Active ingredients in chocolate, known as methylxanthines (such as caffeine, theophylline, and theobromine), has been researched in relation to perimenstrual craving aetiology. It has been hypothesized that women crave chocolate since methylxanthines has been shown to have the ability to alleviate physical - and perhaps psychological - symptoms associated with menstruation, such as fatigue, irritability, bloating, or cramps.

It seems intuitive to assume that the emergence of a food craving might indicate that the body is low in a specific nutrient, vitamin, or mineral. Understanding the reason behind a craving could lead to confidently supplying the body with that missing food. However, evidence for this is inconsistent and relatively poor. For example, when participants had to consume a nutritionally balanced, liquid diet, they reported more food cravings than during a baseline period, and food craving could be induced by imagining their favourite food although participants were satisfied. Further, females tend to respond with more negative affect to indulging their cravings than males.

During pregnancy - a time during which the body needs more energy and certain nutrients than usual - it seems that the types of craved foods do not differ from usually craved foods, and even if women crave unusual, potentially harmful, foods or other substances, it seems that this is rather driven by social factors than by physiological needs. Similar interpretations have been derived from perimenstrual (chocolate) cravings which, for example, do not disappear after menopause, making hormonal mechanisms unlikely.

There are basic associations between nutrient deficiency and food cravings, but they appear to account for a small fraction of food cravings at most. Instead, several psychological explanations for why and how food cravings emerge have been developed. Prominent models are based on (Pavlovian) conditioning.

== Pregnancy ==
Women will often experience cravings for seemingly random foods during pregnancy. The reason that these cravings occur is not definitively known.

It has been theorized that these cravings might be in order to replace nutrients lost during morning sickness. However, there is substantial evidence that pregnancy cravings serve a social function, rather than a nutritional one. Because popular pregnancy cravings differ in their nutritional make-up from culture to culture, it can be inferred that there is no set of nutritional needs that these cravings are filling. Instead, it may be that strange cravings help pregnant women signal their pregnant status and recruit help from others. Some decent evidence for this is the fact that women often crave obscure foods and reject commonplace ones. Providing pregnant relations with food may have been common among the human ancestor Homo erectus, which provides a possible explanation for the evolution of this behaviour. Studies indicate that 66%-90% of expectant mothers experience at least one food craving, while 50%-85% of women have at least one food aversion. The intensity of cravings during the first three months of pregnancy can be explained by the fact that hormonal changes occur at most in the first three months.

Some of the foods which are commonly craved are:

- Sweets such as chocolate or candy
- Animal protein such as a steak or chicken
- Savory foods (calorie dense) such as chips and pizza
- fast foods such as Chinese and Mexican

Some people even crave non-food items such as chalk, clay, laundry starch, or soap. This is a condition called pica, and may indicate a mineral deficiency or severe anemia. Pica is a condition which is rarely come across in developed countries.

One of the treatments for morning sickness consists of accommodating food cravings and aversions.

Depending from the historical period and the culture there are different traditions regarding pregnancy cravings. Some examples are:

- During pregnancy, Hmong women would follow their food cravings to guarantee that their child would not be born with a deformity.
- In Malta, a pregnant woman is encouraged to satisfy her cravings for specific foods, out of fear that her unborn child will bear a representational birthmark (Maltese: xewqa, literally "desire" or "craving").
- In the Babylonian Talmud, folio 82a of Tractate Yoma mentions pregnancy cravings for non-kosher food (the passage discusses a pregnant woman who craves pork on Yom Kippur) as the paradigmatic example of a presumed life-threatening situation where a person is allowed to eat non-kosher food (and is permitted to eat it on Yom Kippur).
- In the Philippines, the condition is traditionally known as lihi, and it is believed that traits of a food that a pregnant woman craves and consumes is imparted to the child. This also extends to objects or people that a woman would find pleasurable to see during her pregnancy.
- In Thailand, a woman who starts craving sour foods after her period has stopped is deemed to be pregnant.

== Chocolate craving ==
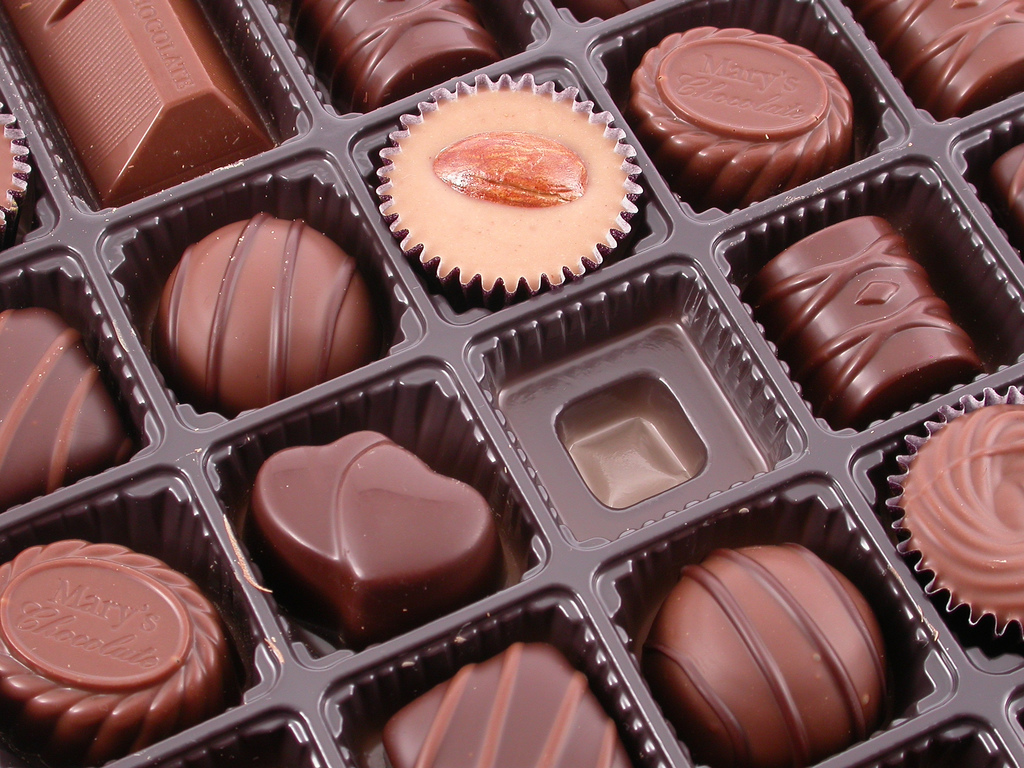
A box of chocolates

Chocolate is seen as a sweet that is desired more by women than by men. Studies conducted in the UK, the US, and Canada have concluded that women indeed crave chocolate more than men. Also, this chocolate craving seems to occur more perimenstrually; however, a biological explanation has not been scientifically proven.

It seems to have a cultural cause instead of a biological cause. Spanish women experience perimenstrual chocolate craving far less than American women (24% versus 60%) although they should not differ much physiologically. Spanish females crave chocolate more after dinner. The times males crave chocolate also differs between both cultures but was the same as the craving for chocolate of females in their culture (except perimenstrual).

Chocolate is often consumed for presumed dietary deficiencies (e.g., magnesium) or to balance possibly low levels of neurotransmitters involved in the regulation of mood, food intake, and compulsive behaviours (e.g., serotonin and dopamine).

Chocolate contains methylxanthines, biogenic amines, and cannabinoid-like fatty acids, all of which potentially cause abnormal behaviours and psychological sensations that parallel those of other addictive substances. The combination of chocolate's sensory characteristics, nutrient composition, and psychoactive ingredients, compounded with monthly hormonal fluctuations and mood swings among women, ultimately form the model of chocolate cravings.

Ambivalence (e.g., "nice but naughty") about foods such as chocolate arises from the attitude that it is highly palatable but should be eaten with restraint. Attempts to restrict intake, however, cause the desire for chocolate to become more salient, an experience that is then labelled as a craving. This, together with a need to provide a reason for why resisting eating chocolate is difficult and sometimes fails, can, in turn, lead the individual to an explanation in terms of addiction (e.g., "chocoholism").

For treating small chocolate cravings, the smell of jasmine has been known to work. Behavioral techniques, particularly cognitive bias modification and imaginal retraining, have demonstrated some efficacy in decreasing food craving.

== Health and social consequences ==
Intense food cravings can disrupt healthy eating and lead to obesity and related health problems. Food cravings can also make it difficult to one to tend to other health needs, including sleep and exercise.

Aside from physical health matters, food cravings can disrupt social life, and lead to problems with employment and family. In extreme cases, extreme food cravings can lead to violence and legal problems, or contribute to accidents, especially motor vehicle accidents if a craving consumes one's mind.

== See also ==
- Binge eating disorder
- Bulimia nervosa
- Eating disorder
- Food pairing
- Hyperalimentation
- Satiety value
- Sugar addiction
- Food Cravings Questionnaires
