= Usog =

Topic in Filipino psycho-medicine

Usog or balis is a Filipino superstition whereby an affliction or psychological disorder is attributed to a stranger's greeting or evil eye hex. It is usually attributed to afflictions of infants and toddlers.

In some limited areas, it is said that the condition is also caused by the stranger having an evil eye or masamang mata in Tagalog, lurking around. This may have been influenced by the advent of the Spaniards who long believed in the mal de ojo superstition.

Once affected, the child begins to develop fever, and sometimes convulsions. Supposedly, the child can be cured by placing its clothing in hot water and boiling it. In most other places, to counter the effects of the "usog" the stranger or newcomer is asked to put some of their saliva on the baby's abdomen, shoulder or forehead before leaving the house. The newcomer then leaves while saying: "Pwera usog... pwera usog..." ("Out, usog") The saliva is placed on the finger initially, before the finger is rubbed on the baby's abdomen or forehead. The stranger is never to lick the child. The practice is that the stranger or visitor is asked to touch their finger with saliva to the child's body, arm or foot ("lawayan") to prevent the child from getting overpowered ("upang hindi mausog"). Protective charms may also be added to an infant's clothing to ward off usog.

== Possible scientific explanation ==
One theory (Kristina Palacio) explains usog in terms of child distress that leads to greater susceptibility to illness and diseases. There are observations that a stranger (or a newcomer or even a visiting relative) especially someone with a strong personality (physically big, boisterous, has strong smell, domineering, etc.) may easily distress a child. Thus, the child is said to be "overpowered" or nauusog and thus may feel afraid, develop fever, get sick, etc.

In usog, the child's distress is the consequence of the child's failure to adapt to change. It is, in medical terms, the consequence of the disruption of homeostasis through physical or psychological stimuli brought about by the stranger. Technically, the condition results from the child-environment interaction that leads the child to perceive a painful discrepancy, real or imagined, between the demands of a situation on the one hand and their social, biological, or psychological resources on the other. The stressful stimuli to the child may be mental (stranger is perceived as a threat, malevolent or demanding), physiological (loud and/or high-pitched voice of the stranger that is hurting to the child's eardrum; strong smell of the stranger that irritates the child's nasal nerves), or physical (stranger has heavy hands or is taking up too much space).

The stranger's act of gently placing his finger with his saliva to the child's arm, foot, or any particular part of the child's body, could make him more familiar to the child, and thus, reduce if not remove the stress. As the stranger keeps gently saying, "Pwera usog... pwera usog...," the child is made to feel and assured that he means no harm. The usog is said to be counteracted because the child is prevented from succumbing to an illness since the child is no longer in distress. Children or even adults who are shy or have weak personalities are more susceptible to usog in accordance with observations and theory. Some have observed that at times even praising a shy child by a visiting relative caused an usog.

The saliva from the stranger, granted that they are healthy and consistent with their oral hygiene, is relatively clean and contains enough antimicrobial compounds such as lactoferrin, lactoperoxidase, and secretory immunoglobulin A which can help clear pathogens from the child and benefit the child against infection. Furthermore, human saliva has opiorphin, a newly researched pain-killing substance. Initial research with mice shows the compound has a painkilling effect of up to six times that of morphine. It works by stopping the normal breakdown of natural pain-killing opioids in the spine, called enkephalins. Opiorphin in human saliva is a relatively simple molecule, and the child's immune system may trigger a biochemical cascade (complement system) to produce other stress-reducing compounds.

Usog can also, though less commonly, affect adults, and it may induce vomiting and stomach ache rather than fever. Supposedly, it can be prevented by stopping a stranger or visitor from greeting the person.

Unlike "lihi", however, usog is not yet medically accepted. More than the superstitious folks, researchers dealing with Filipino Psychology say they have observed this phenomenon with regularity and suggest that this be added to the fifth edition of the Diagnostic and Statistical Manual of Mental Disorders (DSM-5).

== See also ==
- Evil eye
- Lihi
- Albulario
- Saliva
- Opiorphin
- Filipino Psychology
