= Albularyo =

Filipino term for a witch doctor

Albularyo or albulario is a Filipino term for a witch doctor, folk healer or medicine man, derived from Spanish herbolario (herbalist). They practice folk medicine and use medicinal plants in their trade.

== Practices ==
An albularyo is a "folk doctor" commonly found in the more rural areas of the Philippines who heals people using herbs and traditional practices such as hilot or massage. Their services are considered either a first or a last resort for addressing illnesses. The patient claims that the albularyo has supernatural powers that modern medicine does not provide and thus sees them as more trustworthy than modern medicine practitioners. Aside from practicing folk medicine, the albularyo is also alleged to practice black magic and curse people.

The albularyos practice their practice using prayers called orasyon (from Spanish oracion), and rituals. They also use concoctions made from plant parts such as leaves, bark, roots and oils such as coconut oils. Pangalap is the process of searching for these medicinal plants, and pabukal is the preparation of decoctions from said plants. Albularyos also use their own saliva and pieces of papers with writings. The albularyo use tawas (alum) crystals to find out who is causing the ailments in their patients." They may also use candle wax poured in water, eggs, or spirits to divine the cause of the ailments. Some ailments are claimed to be the work of lamang lupa who were unknowingly or knowingly harmed by the patient. The albularyo may then use rituals and prayers to drive away the spirit and therefore remove the sickness from the patient.

== See also ==
- Hilot, traditional Filipino medicine that uses massage
- Kulam, or Filipino witchcraft
- Pagtatawas, or Filipino ritual for the diagnosis of illnesses
- Folk medicine
