= Miracle Chapati =

Religious apparition in Bangalore, India

A closeup of the Miracle Chapati. Photo credits, The BBC

The Miracle Chapati or Chapati Jesus is a chapati, or flat unleavened bread, roughly eight centimeters in diameter with, what believers claim, is an image of Christ miraculously burnt on it. The chapati was baked by Sheela Antony of Bangalore, India in early September 2002, enshrined in Bangalore, and visited by thousands of believers and curious onlookers.

== Origin ==
The baker of the Miracle Chapati, Sheela Antony, a devout Catholic, baked dozens of chapatis daily. One day in September 2002, she had given her children some to eat. Her daughter refused to eat one, remarking that it was burnt. Anthony was on the verge of discarding it, but on inspection noticed that the burn mark resembled Christ, an opinion confirmed by her daughter and many of her neighbours. She handed it over to her parish priest, George Jacob, who agreed and promptly pronounced it a miracle. It was then put it in a glass case for exhibition.

== Publicity ==
Over the next few days, nearly 20,000 Christians traveling from as far as Mysore and Chennai went to the central shrine of the Retreat Centre, where the chapati was on display, to pay homage and offer prayers to this piece of bread. Apart from Christians, a number of Hindus and Muslims also visited the Centre to view the chapati. Information on the chapati was broadcast on Indian national television and reported by The Times of India, The Times and the British Broadcasting Corporation.

== Believers and skeptics ==
One Indian journalist, initially skeptical, claimed to have "different feelings" on witnessing the bread in person.

Skeptics assert that the mind often sees what it wishes to, and that the chapati does not actually resemble Jesus any more than it could resemble South America, albeit from a different angle. Furthermore, as there are no contemporary descriptions or likenesses of Jesus known, it is impossible to know what Jesus looks like.

== See also ==
- Perceptions of religious imagery in natural phenomena
- Religious pareidolia
- Superstitions of India
