= Carromancy =

Form of divination involving wax

Carromancy (from Greek κηρός, 'wax', and μαντεία, 'divination'), otherwise known as ceromancy, is a form of divination involving wax. One of the most common methods of carromancy is to heat wax until molten, then to pour it directly into cold water. The shapes and movements of the wax as it cools and solidifies can then allegedly be read to forecast auguries of the future. Another method more commonly practiced in the contemporary era is studying the burning of an ordinary candle. The movements and erratic actions of the flame are then said to predict the future.

Carromancy was widespread in ancient Russia and is also known in modern Russia as one of the Christmas rituals.

Carromancy also has roots in ancient Celtic and perhaps later in Ancient Roman times. According to scraps of knowledge salvaged from around the period AD 500, it appears that the candle burned during a druid's vigil was poured into a bowl and then into a clear pool of cold water. The auguries for the future could then be read.

== See also ==
- Pagtatawas
