= The Goodman's Croft =

The Goodman's Croft was a superstition common in 16th and 17th century Great Britain, particularly in Scotland. It was also known as the Guideman's Grunde, Halyman's Croft, Goodman's Fauld, Gi'en Rig, Deevil's Craft, Clooties Craft, and the Black Faulie. The practice consisted of leaving a portion of cultivable land untilled and devoting it to a supernatural being in the hopes of placating it and ensuring good fortune. Many crofters left patches of land untilled to ensure that their livelihood would thrive. If a crofter was to cultivate this land, it was believed that it would bring bad fortune, particularly in the form of cattle diseases.

== Religious opposition ==
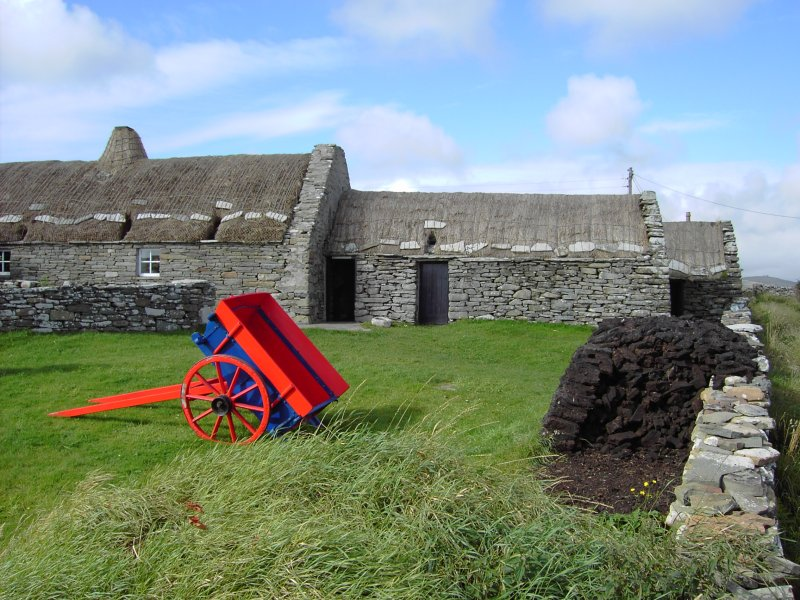
A restored example of a croft at the Shetland Crofthouse Museum.

Most early extant records of the 'Good Man's Croft' are from the records of religious groups that condemned it.

An early example of this condemnation by a religious group was in 1594 by the General Assembly of the Reformed Kirk. They defined it as "not labouring ane parcell of ground dedicate to the Devil, under the name of Goodman's Croft." The Kirk believed this to be a form of Satan worship, but suggestions have been made that these were more ancient offerings to general 'spirits':

‘The good man’ who owns the croft is an ambiguous figure. He is an imagined source of magical power, and, in the context of the Christian church, could only be understood as the devil – an instance of the process of demonisation of the gods and spirits of the pagan past.

Church forces laboured to abolish the practice throughout the sixteenth and seventeenth centuries, particularly through the use of heavy fines on those who were proven to have practised it.

Although the practice of keeping the 'Good Man's Croft' has been linked to Jonet Wishert in Aberdeen in 1596 for witchcraft, there are no records of the untilled field called the good man's croft in the witchcraft database.

== End of practice ==
Many portions of land that were left uncultivated as part of this practice were not tilled until the 19th century, when economic pressure forced crofters to utilise all their land. The crofters were faced with a stark choice between paying large fines imposed by religious authorities, or by causing the supernatural death of their cattle by cultivating 'Good Man's Croft'.
