= Djucu =

Brown and black nut

A Djucu (pronounced joo-ko) is a brown and black nut that comes from the sea. On the Dutch island of Curaçao, it is considered a "lucky stone" that washes up on the shores of Curaçao and Venezuela.

These "stones" get very warm when rubbed. They are believed to bring luck and wellness and are commonly used as good luck charms in gambling.

The Djucu is very popular in Aruba where it is used to make jewellery and is considered essential when gambling in many of Aruba's casinos. In Aruba, many people have their Djucus set in gold and put on a chain for good luck.
