= Puppy pregnancy syndrome =

Culture-bound psychosomatic illness

Puppy pregnancy syndrome (PPS) is a psychosomatic illness in humans brought on by mass hysteria. Individuals suffering from PPS believe that shortly after being bitten by a dog, puppies are conceived within their abdomen. This is said to be especially likely if the dog is sexually excited at the time of the attack. Victims are said to bark like dogs and have reported being able to see the puppies inside them when looking at water or hear them growling in their abdomen. It is believed that the victims will eventually die – especially men, who will give birth to their puppies through the penis. Witch doctors offer oral cures, which they claim will dissolve the puppies, allowing them to pass through the digestive system and be excreted "without the knowledge of the patient". The syndrome is thought to be localized in villages in several states of India. Some psychiatrists believe that PPS meets the criteria for a culture-bound disorder.

== Epidemiology ==
The syndrome is thought to be localized in villages in several states of India, including Assam, Bihar, Chhattisgarh, Jharkhand, Odisha, and West Bengal, and has been reported by tens of thousands of individuals. It is far more prevalent in areas with little access to education. Some psychiatrists believe that PPS meets the criteria for a culture-bound disorder.

== Education ==
Doctors in India have tried to educate the public that this condition is impossible and a superstition. Believing in the condition may be dangerous, as a person may have become infected with rabies after a bite, and seeking witch doctor treatment can delay medical treatment. Most sufferers are referred to psychiatric services, but in some instances patients fail to take anti-rabies medication before symptom onset, thinking that they are pregnant with a puppy and that folk medicine will cure them. This misbelief is further compounded by witch doctors who state that their medicine will fail if sufferers seek standard treatment.

== See also ==
- Clinical lycanthropy
- Delusional parasitosis
- Superstition in India
