= Spilling salt =

Evil omen in European superstition

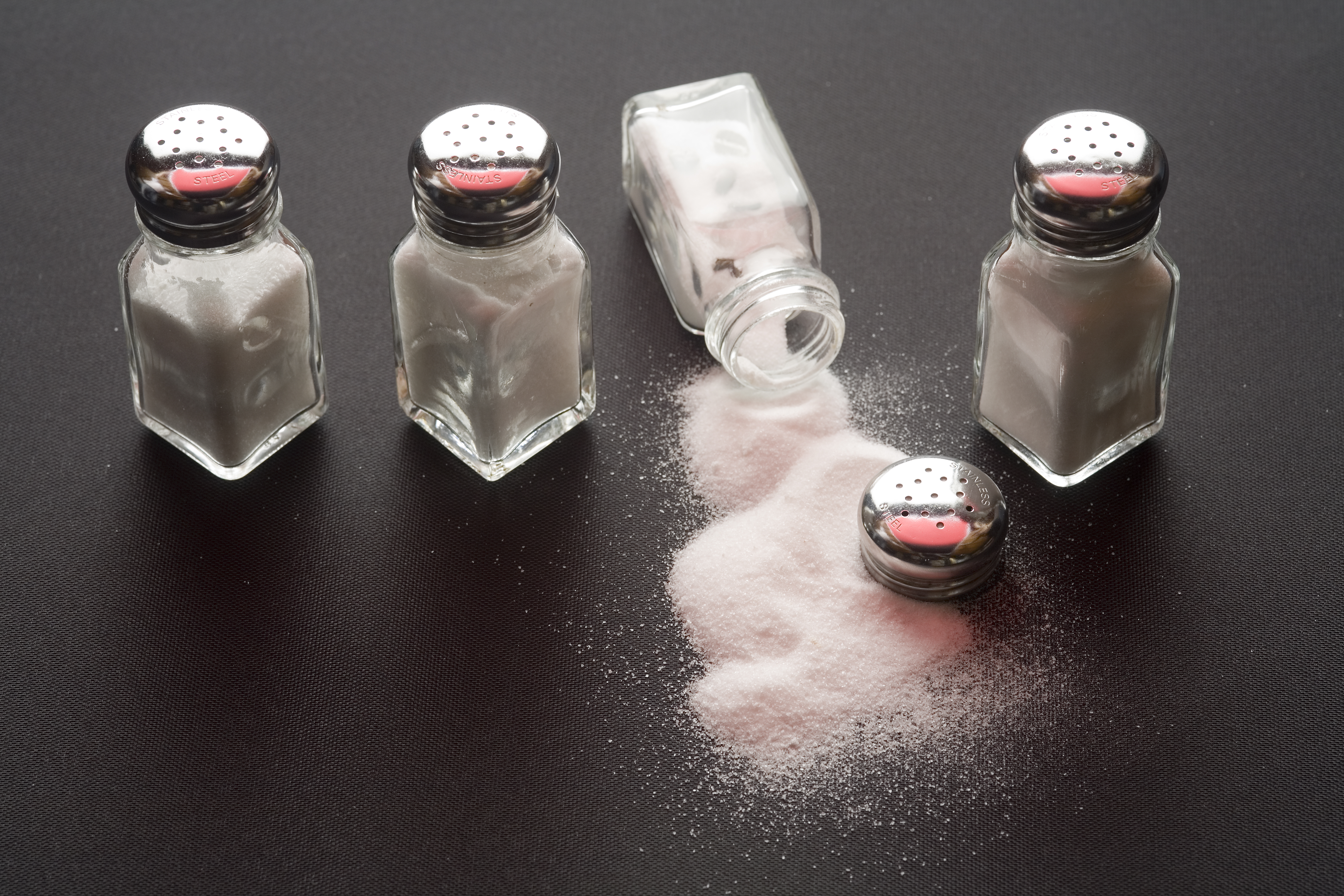
Four salt shakers with salt spilled from the open one

A superstition in Western cultures holds that spilling salt is an evil omen. However, salt has had a variety of meanings in religions around the world.

== History ==
The European belief in the ill luck that comes from spilt salt is quite old, going back to ancient Rome. The 1556 Hieroglyphica of Piero Valeriano Bolzani reports that "(s)alt was formerly a symbol of friendship, because of its lasting quality. For it makes substances more compact and preserves them for a long time: hence it was usually presented to guests before other food, to signify the abiding strength of friendship. Wherefore many consider it ominous to spill salt on the table, and, on the other hand, propitious to spill wine, especially if unmixed with water."

This may not be the actual explanation since salt was a valuable commodity in ancient times and, as such, was seen as a symbol of trust and friendship. A German proverb held that "whoever spills salt arouses enmity". According to Charles Nodier, among "savages", the "action of spilling salt ... indicates among them the refusal of protection and hospitality from such strangers as they may have reason to suspect are thieves and murderers."

This led to the common misconception that due to salt being such a valuable item Roman soldiers were paid in it. There is no historical evidence for this belief. The idea is so widely held and has been for so long that the etymology of the word "salary" comes from the Latin salarium, originally meaning "salt money" (Lat. sal, salt), i.e. the sum paid to soldiers for salt.

One widespread explanation of the belief that it is unlucky to spill salt is that Judas Iscariot spilled the salt at the Last Supper, and, indeed, Leonardo da Vinci's The Last Supper depicts Judas Iscariot having knocked over a salt-cellar. This is often taken as a questionable explanation because spilling salt was generally considered a bad omen already, and the imagery predates Leonardo's usage.

Some have scoffed at the omen. Herbert Spencer wrote that "A consciousness in which there lives the idea that spilling salt will be followed by some evil, obviously allied as it is to the consciousness of the savage, filled with beliefs in omens and charms, gives a home to other beliefs like those of the savage." Even now a variety of methods are used to avert the evil omen of spilled salt. The most common contemporary belief requires you to toss a pinch of the spilt salt over your left shoulder, into the face of the Devil who lurks there. Though generally disregarded as an ineffectual superstition, Professor Jane Risen of the University of Chicago has published research that shows such "jinx avoidance behavior" can have a positive effect on people's actions after a perceived bad luck event.

== Salt in religions throughout the world ==
One of the reasons that this superstition has been so enduring and widespread is that salt has long held an important place in religions of many cultures.

- In Brahmanic sacrifices and during festivals held by Semites as well the Greeks at the time of the new moon, salt was thrown into fire to make crackling noises.
- Ancient Egyptians, Greeks, and Romans invoked gods with salt offerings. Some people think this to be the origin of Holy Water in Christianity.
- In Aztec mythology, Huixtocihuatl was a fertility goddess who presided over salt and salt water.
- Salt is an auspicious substance in Hinduism and is used in ceremonies like house-warmings and weddings.
- In Jainism, an offering of raw rice with a pinch of salt signifies devotion and salt is sprinkled on a person's cremated remains before burial.
- Salt is believed to ward off evil spirits in Mahayana Buddhist tradition, and after a funeral, salt is thrown over the left shoulder to prevent evil spirits from entering the house.
- In Shinto, salt ritually purifies locations and people and piles of salt are placed in dishes by the entrance of businesses to ward off evil and attract patrons.
- In the Old Testament thirty-five verses mention salt, some examples are:

- Lot's wife was turned into a pillar of salt when she looked back at Sodom and Gomorrah (Genesis 19:26) as they were destroyed.
- When the judge Abimelech destroyed Shechem he is said to have "sown salt on it," (Judges 9:45).
- The Book of Job mentions salt as a condiment. "Can that which is unsavoury be eaten without salt? or is there any taste in the white of an egg?" (Job 6:6).

- In the New Testament, six verses mention salt, examples include:

- In the Sermon on the Mount, Jesus referred to followers as the "salt of the earth".
- The apostle Paul encouraged Christians to "let your conversation be always full of grace, seasoned with salt" (Colossians 4:6).

- In Catholicism:

- Salt is mandatory in the rite of the Tridentine Mass.
- Salt is the third item (which includes an Exorcism) of the Celtic Consecration, or Gallican Rite, employed in church consecration.
- It may be added to the water "where it is customary" in the rite of Holy water.

- In Judaism, it is recommended to have either a salty bread or to add salt to the bread if this bread is unsalted when doing Kiddush for Shabbat. It is customary to spread some salt over the bread or to dip the bread in a little salt when passing the bread around the table after the Kiddush.
  - To preserve the covenant between their people and God, Jews dip Sabbath bread in salt.
- In Wicca, it is symbolic of the element Earth. It also cleanses an area of harmful, negative energy. A dish of salt and one of water are on most altars, and salt is used in many rituals.

== See also ==
- Salting the earth
