= Food Cravings Questionnaires =

Medical questionnaire

The Food Cravings Questionnaires (FCQs) are among the most widely used self-report questionnaires for measuring food craving. They were developed by Antonio Cepeda-Benito and colleagues in 2000. For the 39-item trait version (FCQ-T), respondents indicate how frequently each statement is true for them in general on a six-point scale with 1 = never/not applicable, 2 = rarely, 3 = sometimes, 4 = often, 5 = usually, and 6 = always. For the 15-item state version (FCQ-S), respondents indicate the extent to which they agree with each statement right now, at this very moment, on a five-point scale with 1 = strongly disagree, 2 = disagree, 3 = neutral, 4 = agree, 5 = strongly agree.

== Scoring ==
The FCQs were designed to assess the multidimensional nature of food craving and, thus, assess several aspects such as emotions before a food craving is experienced or before eating, affective responses after eating, thoughts about food, or loss of control over food consumption. For the FCQ-T, these aspects are reflected in 9 subscales. To calculate a subscale score, item responses of each subscale are added up to sum scores as indicated in the table below. A total score of the FCQ-T can also be calculated by summing up all 39 items. No items have to be recoded prior to summation of item responses. Thus, total FCQ-T scores can range between 39 and 234 and higher scores indicate more frequent and intense experiences of food craving in general.

Subscale	Items
Having intentions and plans to consume food	5, 18, 23
Anticipation of positive reinforcement that may result from eating	9, 10, 15, 24, 38
Anticipation of relief from negative states and feelings as a result of eating	16, 19, 21
Lack of control over eating	2, 3, 22, 25, 26, 29
Thoughts and preoccupation with food	6, 8, 27, 28, 31, 32, 33
Craving as a physiological state	11, 12, 13, 14
Emotions that may be experienced before or during food cravings or eating	20, 30, 34, 39
Cues that may trigger food cravings	1, 35, 36, 37
Guilt from cravings and/or for giving into them	4, 7, 17

The FCQ-S has five subscales. To calculate a subscale score, item responses of each subscale are added up to sum scores as indicated in the table below. A total score of the FCQ-S can also be calculated by summing up all 15 items. No items have to be recoded prior to summation of item responses. Thus, total FCQ-S scores can range between 15 and 75 and higher scores indicate more intense current food craving.

Subscale	Items
An intense desire to eat	1, 2, 3
Anticipation of positive reinforcement that may result from eating	4, 5, 6
Anticipation of relief from negative states and feelings as a result of eating	7, 8, 9
Lack of control over eating	10, 11, 12
Craving as a physiological state (i.e., hunger)	13, 14, 15

== Reliability ==
Both FCQs have high internal reliability (Cronbach's alpha >.90). The FCQ-T also has high test-retest reliability which is, expectedly, lower for the FCQ-S as a state-dependent measure.

== Validity ==
Factorial validity has received limited support as factor structure of the FCQs could not be replicated in several studies. Construct validity of the FCQ-T has been supported in that higher FCQ-T scores are predictive of stronger food-cue reactivity (e.g., larger increases in current food craving when exposed to tempting food stimuli) and higher consumption of high-calorie foods. Discriminant validity of the FCQ-T has been supported in that scores are largely unaffected by momentary states such as hunger and satiety. Construct validity of the FCQ-S has been supported in that higher FCQ-S scores relate to a longer food deprivation and are predictive of higher food intake in laboratory studies. Discriminant validity of the FCQ-S has been supported in that scores are largely unrelated to trait-like eating behaviors and body weight.

== Translated versions ==
The FCQ-T has been translated into several other languages such as Spanish, German, Italian, Portuguese, Persian, Turkish, and Chinese. The FCQ-S has also been translated into several other languages such as Spanish, German, Italian, Portuguese, and Korean

== Modified versions ==
Several abbreviated or otherwise modified versions of the FCQs have been developed. The General Food Cravings Questionnaires (G-FCQs) are the Dutch translation of the FCQs. The G-FCQ-T includes 21 of the original FCQ-T's 39 items and the G-FCQ-S has (similar to the FCQ-S) 15 items but references to "one or more specific foods" were replaced by "something tasty". The FCQ-T-reduced (FCQ-T-r) includes 15 of the original FCQ-T's 39 items and has been used in several languages such as English, German, Portuguese, French, Persian, Spanish, Italian, and Persian. The FCQ-T-r has been recommended as a measure in studies on weight loss and weight maintenance by the Accumulating Data to Optimally Predict Obesity Treatment (ADOPT) Core Measures Project, which selected measures that are reliable, valid, brief, publicly available, and easily administered and scored. Maranhão and colleagues suggested abbreviated versions using the Portuguese versions of the FCQs with eight items (abbreviated FCQ-T) and five items (abbreviated FCQ-S). Chocolate-specific versions in which the items specifically refer to craving for chocolate have been developed for the FCQ-T, FCQ-T-r, and FCQ-S.

== Comparison with other measures ==
The Food Craving Inventory (FCI) measures the frequency of cravings for specific foods over the past month. Thus, the FCI can be used as an alternative to the FCQ-T for the assessment of food craving for different type of food groups. However, because the FCI names specific foods, it necessitates cultural adaptations when applied in different countries, which results in different versions of the FCI (i.e., different foods, number of items, and subscales). Thus, the FCQ-T may be better suited than the FCI for cross-cultural studies.

Similar to the FCQs, the Craving Experience Questionnaire (CEQ) has a scale for measuring craving as a trait (entitled "frequency form) and a scale for measuring craving as a state (entitled "strength form"). The CEQ is particularly suited for assessing craving across different substances (including food) as a specific substance or food that the items refer to can be specified. Development of the CEQ was based on the rationale to create a measure that purely assesses the cognitive aspects of craving experiences (i.e., craving intensity, cognitive images, and intrusive thoughts about the substance) without confounding other aspects such as consumption behavior and outcome expectancies (i.e., aspects that are included in the FCQs).

Other self-report questionnaires that were designed to specifically measure chocolate craving are the Attitudes to Chocolate Questionnaire and the Orientation to Chocolate Questionnaire.
