= Nazar battu =

Object used to ward off the evil eye

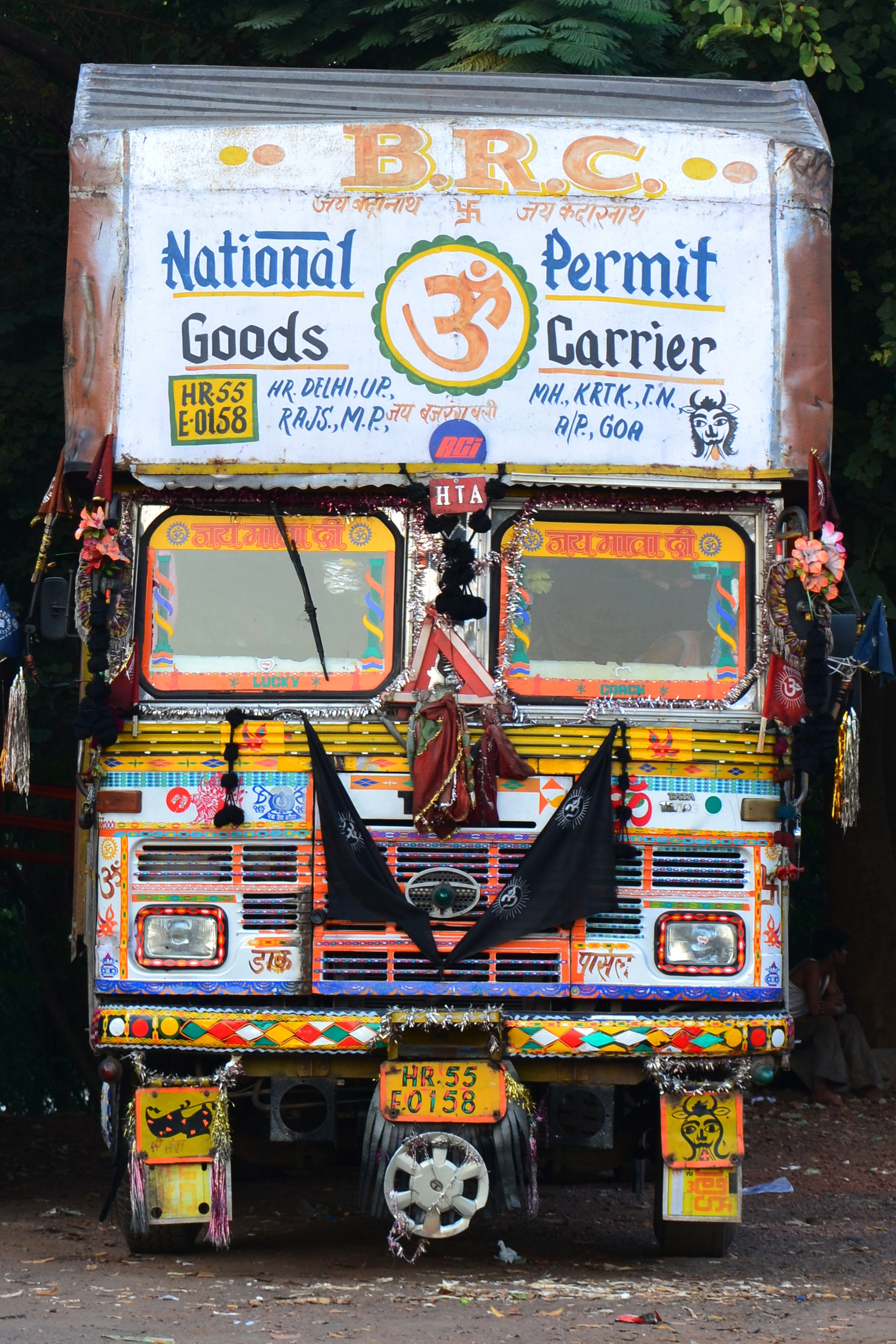
A decorated truck in India, showing a black jutti and nazar battu motifs.

A Nazar battu (Hindustani: नज़र बट्टू or نظر بٹو) is an icon, charm bracelet, tattoo or other object or pattern used in North India and Pakistan to ward-off the evil eye (or nazar). In Persian and Afghan folklore, it is called a cheshm nazar (Persian: چشم نظر) or nazar qurbāni (Persian: نظرقربانی). In India and Pakistan, the Hindi-Urdu slogan of Persian origin Chashm-e-Baddoor (Persian: چشم بد دور) is used to ward off the evil eye.

== Forms ==
A nazar battu is often an intentional blemish or flaw that is introduced to prevent perfection. For instance, a black mark (kaala teeka in Hindi-Urdu, tor khaal in Pushto) might be made on the face or neck of a loved one. In houses, a deliberate flaw might be included in the otherwise-perfect physical appearance of the house. In expensive items such as carpets or saris, a deliberate coloring or stitching flaw is sometimes created. Amulets – some resembling the Turkish nazar boncuğu and others which are threads, sometimes with a taveez attached (a small cylinder that contains a prayer verse) – are common in the region. Some nazar battu amulets are region specific, for instance silver-mounted leopard nails which are used in the Chamba district of Himachal Pradesh state.

Although it doesn't involve a specific nazar battu, it is customary in the region for mothers to lightly spit at their children (usually ritualistically to the side of the children rather than directly at them) to imply a sense of disparagement and imperfection that protects them from nazar. Children are also marked with a black spot on the cheek. Excessive admiration, even from well-meaning people, is believed attract the evil eye, so this is believed to protect children from nazar that could be caused by their own mothers' "excessive" love of them.

== Satirical usage in popular culture ==
In North India and Pakistan, the term nazar battu can be used idiomatically in a satiric sense to allude to people or objects which are undesirable but must be tolerated. For instance, when it appeared that former military ruler Pervez Musharraf would insist on being accommodated institutionally as Pakistan made the transition to democracy with the 2008 general election, some press commentators alluded to him as the nazar battu of Pakistan's democracy.

== Gallery ==
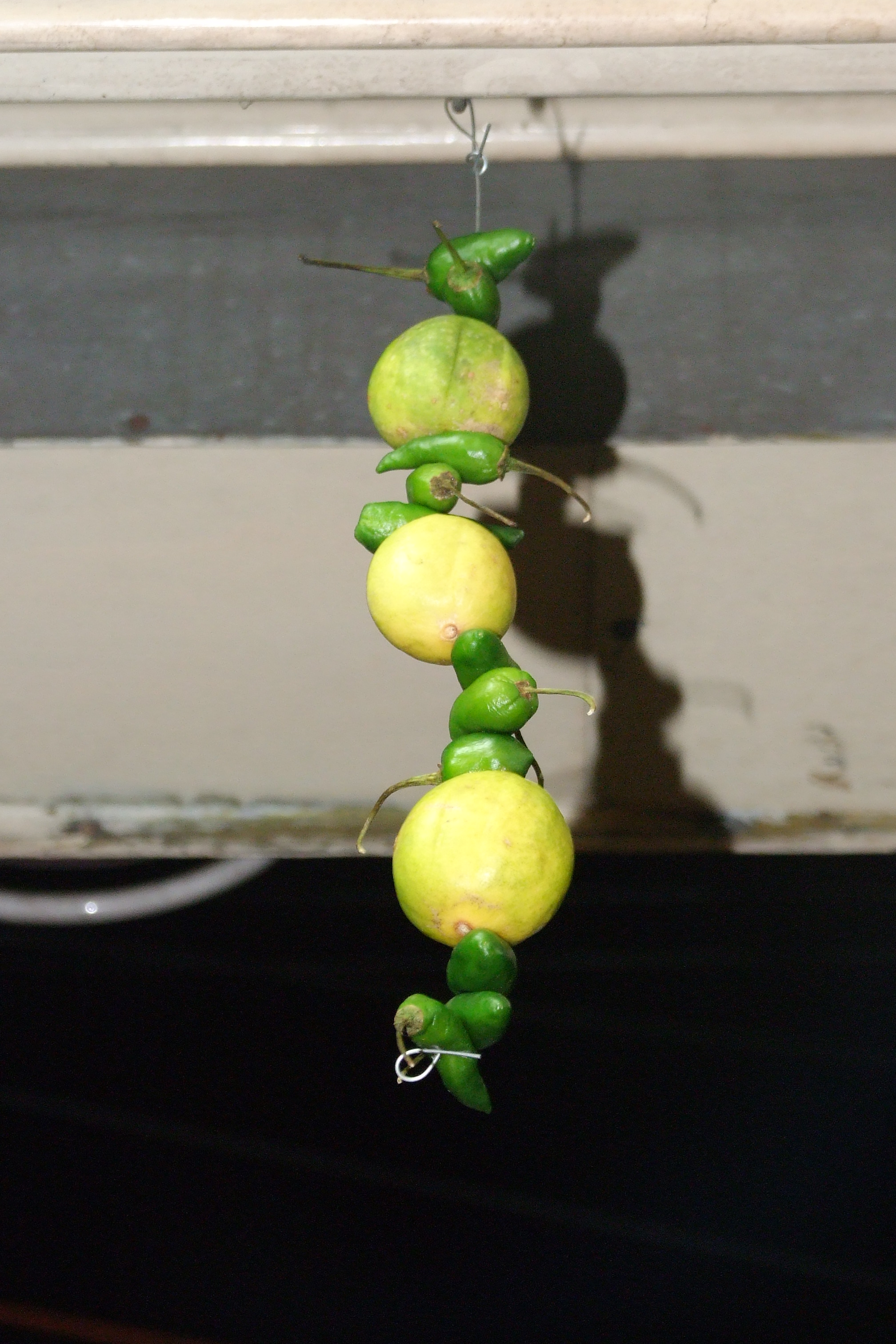
A nazar battu charm strung from chilli peppers and limes

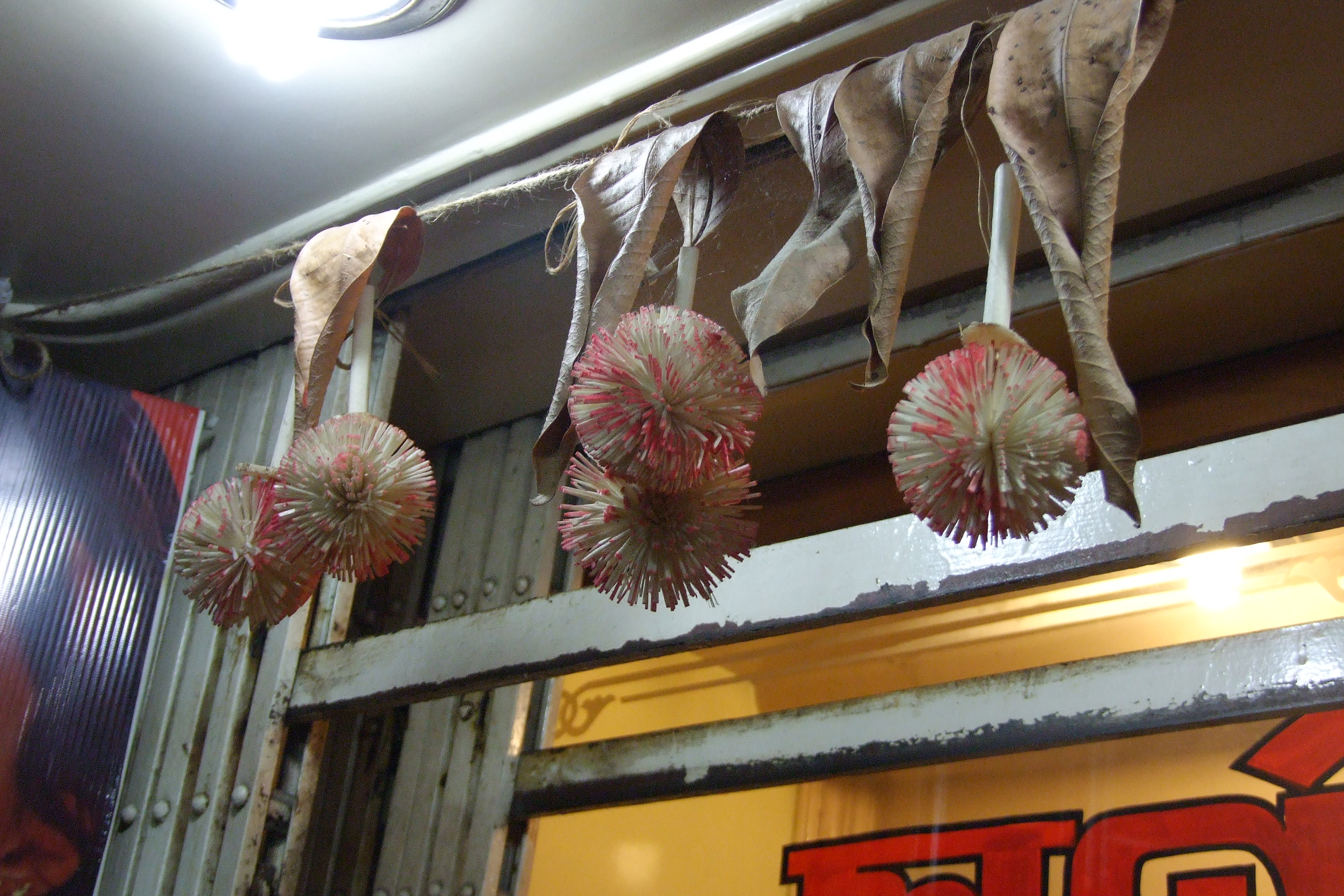
Leaves and balls of flower petals as nazar battu by a shop

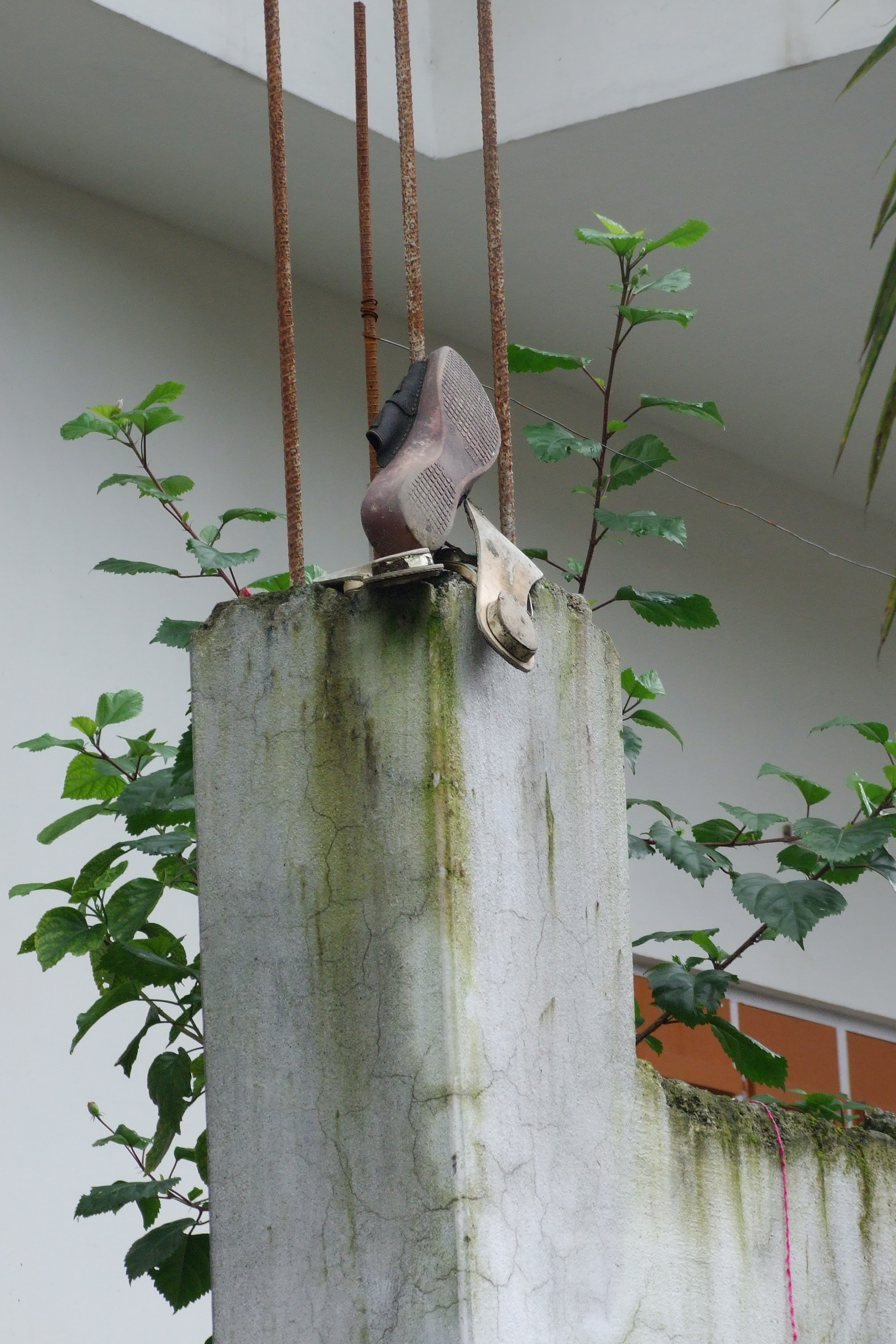
Footwear on a wall used as nazar battu

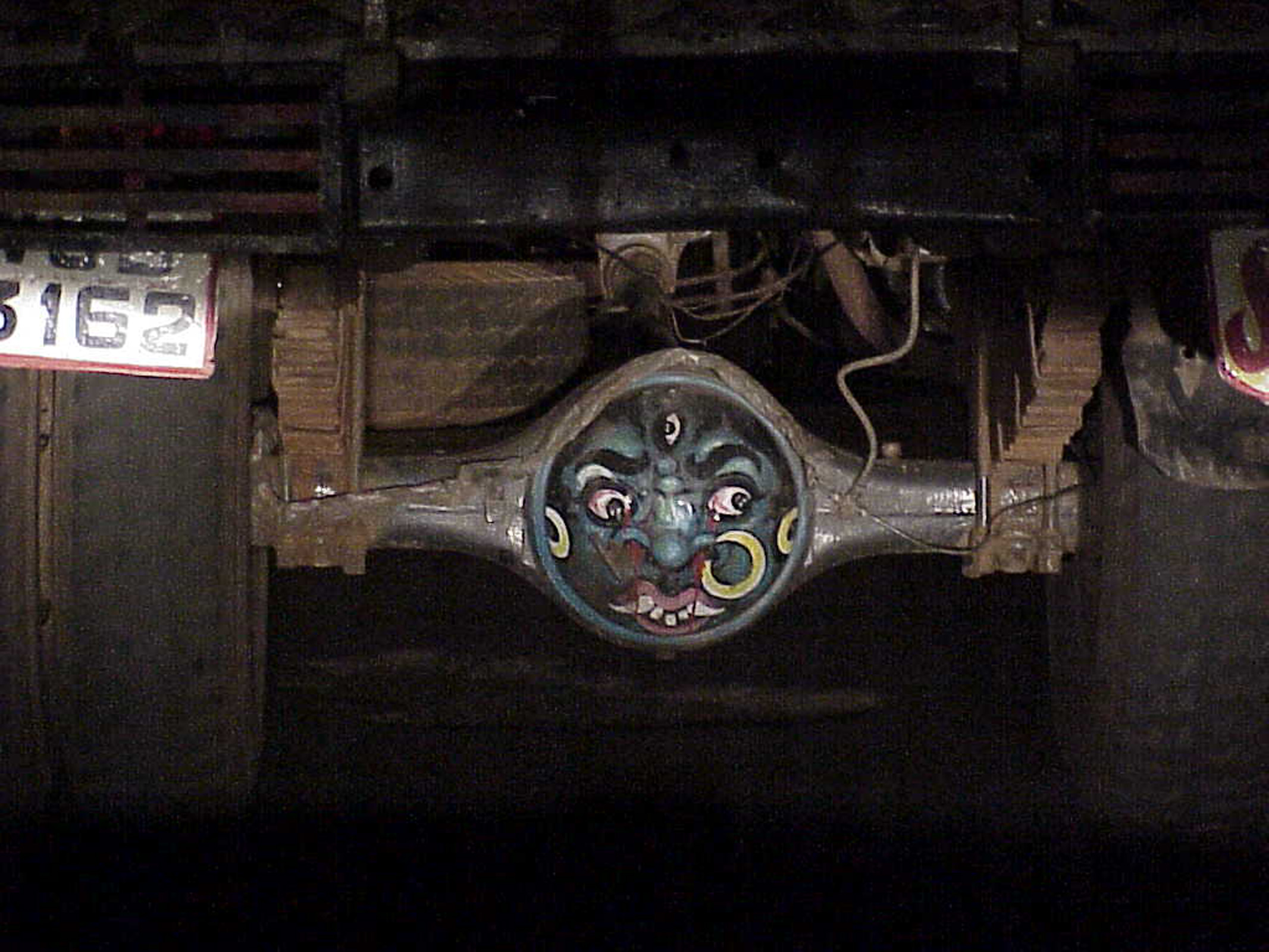
A nazar battu face painted on a motor vehicle

== See also ==
- Chashme Baddoor (slogan)
- Evil eye
- Nazar (amulet)
- Superstition in India
