= Salting the earth =

Ancient symbolic ritual

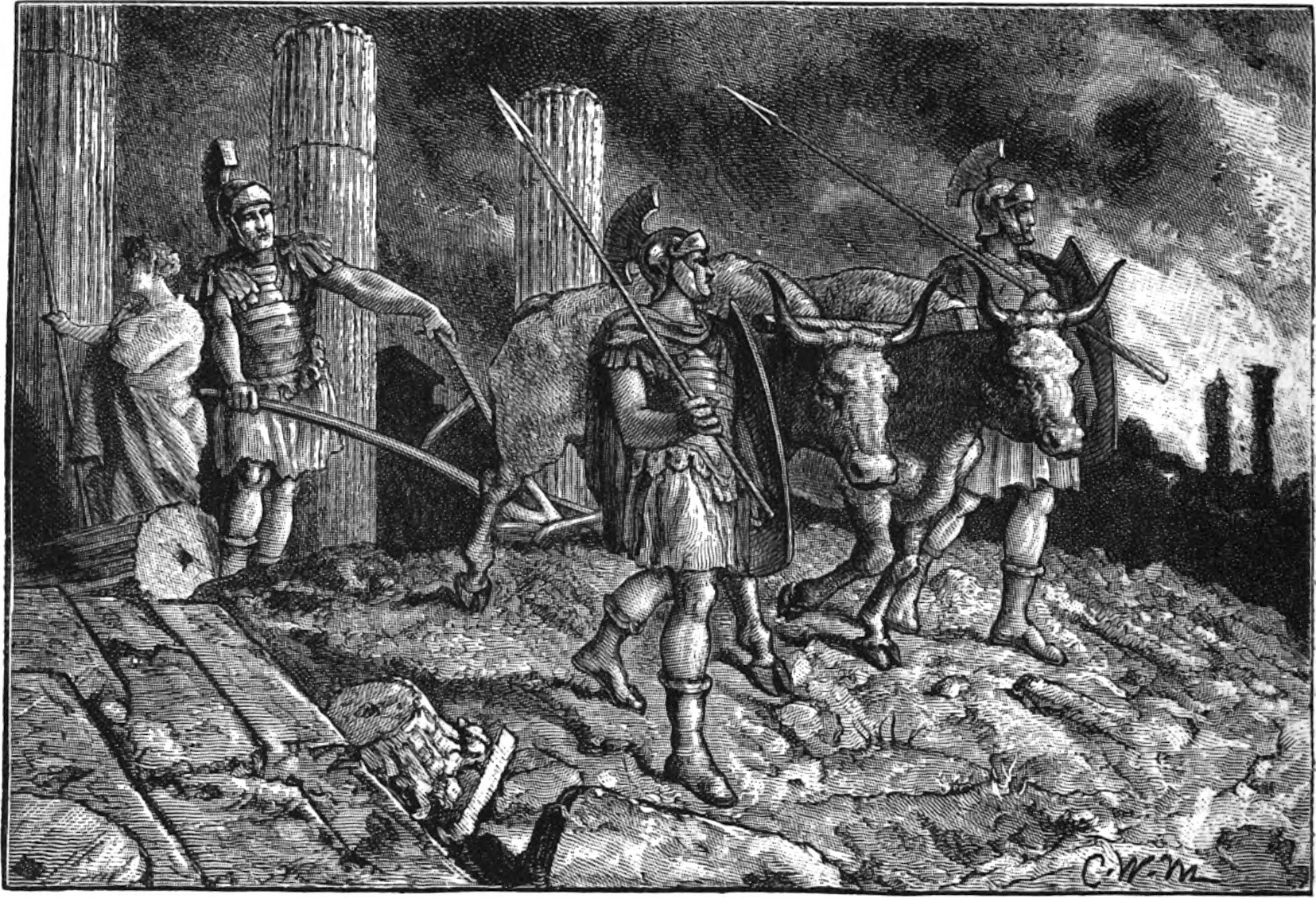
Illustration of a plow being driven over the site of Carthage

Salting the earth, or sowing with salt, is the ritual of spreading salt on the sites of cities razed by conquerors. It originated as a curse on re-inhabitation in the ancient Near East and became a well-established folkloric motif in the Middle Ages. The best-known example is the salting of Shechem as narrated in the Biblical Book of Judges 9:45. The supposed salting of Carthage is not supported by historical evidence.

== Cities ==
The custom of purifying or consecrating a destroyed city with salt and cursing anyone who dared to rebuild it was widespread in the ancient Near East, but historical accounts are unclear as to what the sowing of salt meant in that process. In the case of Shechem, various commentaries explain it as:

...a covenantal curse, a means of ensuring desolation, a ritual to avert the vengeance of the shades of the slaughtered, a purification of the site preparatory to rebuilding, or a preparation for final destruction under the herem ritual.

=== Ancient Near East ===
Various Hittite and Assyrian texts speak of ceremonially strewing salt, minerals, or plants (weeds, "cress", or kudimmu, which are associated with salt and desolation) over destroyed cities, including Hattusa, Taidu, Arinna, Hunusa, Irridu, and Susa. The Book of Judges (9:45) says that Abimelech, the judge of the Israelites, sowed his own capital, Shechem, with salt, c. 1050 BC, after quelling a revolt against him. This may have been part of a ḥērem ritual (see Salt in the Bible).

=== Carthage ===
At least as early as 1863, various texts have claimed that the Roman general Scipio Aemilianus plowed over and sowed the city of Carthage with salt after defeating it in the Third Punic War (146 BC), sacking it, and enslaving the survivors. The salting was probably modeled on the story of Shechem. Though ancient sources mention symbolically drawing a plow over various cities and salting them, none mention Carthage in particular. The salting story entered the academic literature in Bertrand Hallward's chapter in the first edition of the Cambridge Ancient History (1930), and was widely accepted as factual. However, there are no ancient sources for it and it is now considered apocryphal.

=== Palestrina ===
When Pope Boniface VIII destroyed Palestrina in 1299, he ordered that it be plowed "following the old example of Carthage in Africa", and salted. "I have run the plough over it, like the ancient Carthage of Africa, and I have had salt sown upon it ..." The text is not clear as to whether he thought Carthage was salted. Later accounts of other saltings in the destructions of medieval Italian cities are now rejected as unhistorical: Padua by Attila (452), perhaps in a parallel between Attila and the ancient Assyrians; Milan by Frederick Barbarossa (1162); and Semifonte by the Florentines (1202).

=== Jerusalem ===
The English epic poem Siege of Jerusalem (c. 1370) recounts that Titus commanded the sowing of salt on the Temple; this episode is not found in Josephus's account.

=== Spanish Empire ===
In Spain and the Spanish Empire, salt was poured onto the land owned by a convicted traitor (often one who was executed and his head placed on a picota, or pike, afterwards) after his house was demolished.

=== Portugal ===
This was done in Portugal as well. The last known event of this sort was the destruction of the Duke of Aveiro's palace in Lisbon in 1759, due to his participation in the Távora affair (a conspiracy against King Joseph I of Portugal). His palace was demolished and his land was salted. A stone memorial now perpetuates the memory of the shame of the Duke, where it is written:

In this place were put to the ground and salted the houses of José Mascarenhas, stripped of the honours of Duque de Aveiro and others ... Put to Justice as one of the leaders of the most barbarous and execrable upheaval that ... was committed against the most royal and sacred person of the Lord Joseph I. In this infamous land nothing may be built for all time.

=== Brazil ===
In the Portuguese colony of Brazil, the leader of the Inconfidência Mineira, Tiradentes, was sentenced to death and his house was "razed and salted, so that never again be built up on the floor, ... and even the floor will rise up a standard by which the memory is preserved (preserving) the infamy of this heinous offender ..." He suffered further indignities, being hanged and quartered, his body parts carried to various parts of the country where his fellow revolutionaries had met, and his children deprived of their property and honor.During the 2026 Brazilian general election, presidential candidate Renan Santos visited Lula Da Silva's mother's home and salted the soil around it so that "never again can another Lula be born in Brazil".

== Legends ==
An ancient legend recounts that Odysseus feigned madness by yoking a horse and an ox to his plow and sowing salt.

== See also ==
- Scorched earth
- Spilling salt

== Bibliography ==
- Gevirtz, Stanley (1963). "Jericho and Shechem: A Religio-Literary Aspect of City Destruction". Vetus Testamentum. 13 (Fasc. 1): 52–62. doi:10.2307/1516752. JSTOR 1516752.
- Ridley, R. T. (1986). "To Be Taken with a Pinch of Salt: The Destruction of Carthage". Classical Philology. 81 (2): 140–146. doi:10.1086/366973. JSTOR 269786. S2CID 161696751.
- Stevens, Susan T. (1988). "A Legend of the Destruction of Carthage". Classical Philology. 83 (1): 39–41. doi:10.1086/367078. JSTOR 269635. S2CID 161764925.
- Visona, Paolo (1988). "On the Destruction of Carthage Again". Classical Philology. 83 (1): 41–42. doi:10.1086/367079. JSTOR 269636. S2CID 162289604.
- Warmington, B. H. (1988). "The Destruction of Carthage: A Retractatio". Classical Philology. 83 (4): 308–310. doi:10.1086/367123. JSTOR 269510. S2CID 162850949.
