= Hilot =

Ancient Filipino art of healing

Hilot (/HEE-lot/) is a Filipino practice that is intended to heal. It uses manipulation and massage to attempt the treatment outcome, although techniques vary among practitioners. It emerged from the shamanic tradition of the ancient Filipinos with healers considering their practice as derived from their calling from visions or from having been born by breech.

== Overview ==
Hilot incorporates supernatural aspects, particularly in cases of practitioners who claim that their ability is given by a supernatural source such as the case of manghihilot who embarks on pilgrimage to a mountain called Banahaw to satisfy the spiritual component of their healing practice. A Hilot practitioner or albularyo (herbalist) are often cheaper alternatives to medical doctors in the Philippines, especially in very deep rural areas. A Manghihilot employs chiropractic-like manipulation and massage for the diagnosis and treatment of musculoskeletal ailments. They also have been recognized to reset dislocated and sprained joints such as the knee, ankle, fingers and metacarpal bones. An Albularyo use herbs in addition to massage. The term hilot is also applied to traditional midwives, licensed or otherwise (Panday in Meranaw).

== Spiritual and physical components ==
The spiritual component of Hilot treats the relationship between the body's attitude and universal energy. In other words, the goal is to bring the body back to harmony. This focuses on inner change. One way this can be attained is through the Banahaw Devotional Technique. Tracing its origins to the fifteenth century, this technique requires the performance of orations and sacrificial rituals to influence the body's spirit. The goal of this is to seek for forgiveness from God. Depending where the manghihilot and their patient are located, the popular location to perform this technique is in the active volcano of Mt. Banahaw, located in Luzon. Following the Banahaw Devotional Technique is the Pagpapahalaga, or the Valuing Process in which the goal is to direct inner change to outer change with the use of inner understandings. These inner understandings is presented within the following three modules: mabuti (self-honesty), makabubuti (sincerity), makapagpapabuti (consequential goodness). The Banahaw Devotional Technique and Valuing Process are treatments for inner conflicts within the body such as stress which causes the imbalance of the four elements.

The physical aspect of Hilot is addressed through four modalities, which use external forces to help restore balance among the body’s four elements. The bio-chemical modality promotes chemical component changes through the process of breaking down foods, herbs, vitamins, and minerals. The neuro-electrical modality is the use of electricity, in the form of positive and negative ions, to break down material substances in the body. The goal of the third process, electro-magnetic field (EMF), is to cause a change in the neuro-electric field to restore the normal function of the body's cells. The final modality is the bio-mechanical process, which shares similarities with chiropractic methods and practices. This process involves and manipulates the interaction of bones, tendons, and muscles to restore their normal functions. The direction of treatment among all four modalities is from material components (outer) to the inner components of the body.

== Practitioners ==
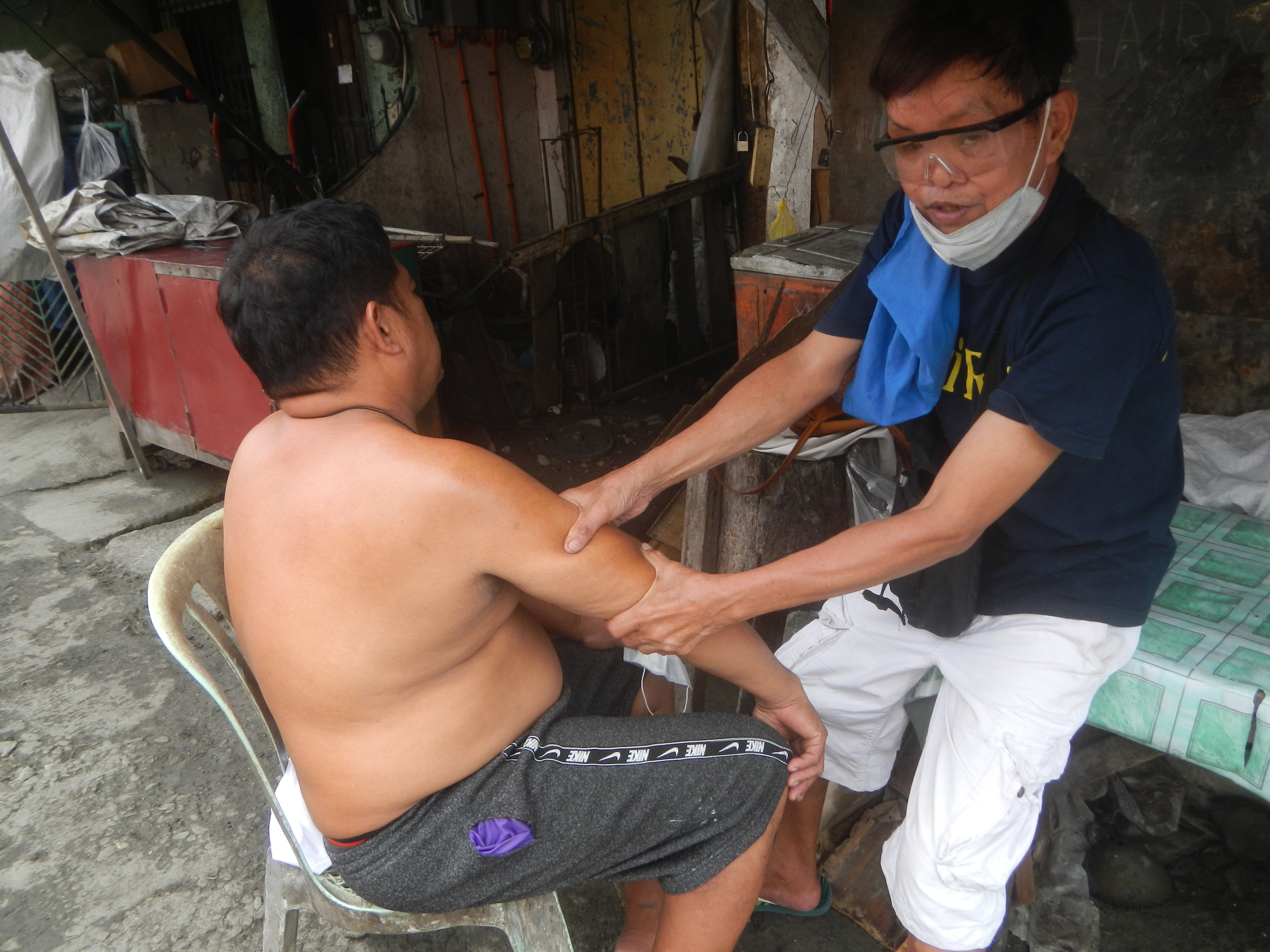
Patient during Hilot therapy

Practitioners of hilot are both the manghihilot and the magpapaanak:

=== Magpapaanak ===
The magpapaanak, the other "hilot", is the folk "midwife" who does prenatal visits and check-ups to pregnant mothers. Normally a woman, she helps babies during childbirth and often performs the ritual called the suob (a form of "aroma therapy" performed while placed under a cloak).

== Traditional Chinese Medicine similarities ==
The geopolitical position of the Philippines as either being the gateway to either enter or exit Southeast Asia has allowed the exchanging of medical knowledge between immigrants, whether they are colonial predecessors or neighboring countries. The Chinese diaspora (see also: Chinese mestizos) showed one exchange. The trade between China and the Philippines was recorded as early as the eighth century and expanded in the sixteenth century. The activity of trade during the sixteenth century was especially active because of the Manila-Acapulco Galleons. The methods used by manghihilots is similar to the Chinese acupuncture study of the Yellow Emperor's Body, the idea that the body through fluids of energy known as a yin and yang, in Traditional Chinese Medicine (TCM). Native Filipino medicine uses the four elements (earth, water, fire, and air) to diagnose conditions while TCM views the conditions of the body through the Five Element Theory: fire, earth, wind, metal, water, and wood. Another similarity is the diagnosis of imbalance caused by engkantos, or the unseen entities within the body. For instance, the manghihilot may describe a person who is having trouble breathing air by calling that trouble engkanto sa hangin meaning air entity. This person's actual condition may be asthma according to Western medicine. In TCM, this imbalance may be explained by the imbalance set between yin and yang (the force of yin may be dominating the body and vice versa). Other similar approaches to diagnosing include herbal remedies (not necessarily accompanied by the blessing of it shown in the Albularyo practice), taking patient history, facial diagnosis, and tongue diagnosis. Current research on the Hilot shows that it is not clear as to whether or not the Chinese medicine had a direct influence on the Hilot or the Hilot had an influence on TCM because it is not clear whether these Hilot methods were a coincidence of similarities or borrowed from Traditional Chinese Medicine since the people coming from Southern China were primarily involved in commerce. It is also not clear which Indigenous practices originated from Ayurveda. It is not known whether these merchants had medical knowledge.

== Present day ==
The sophistication of the practice has evolved over time and is still being practiced, primarily in rural areas of the Philippines. The challenges of incorporating traditional/alternative medicine into the Philippine national health care system shows the competition against Western medicine because of the stigma of superstition and the lack of scholarly evidence to prove alternative medicine effective. There are organizations advocating for the fusion of both western medicine and alternative medicine out of the Traditional and Alternative Medicine Act (TAMA) passed in 1997 to make healthcare accessible in rural areas. The Philippine Institute of Traditional and Alternative Health Care (PITAHC) is one of the advocacy groups formed from TAMA and one of their objectives is to: "Encourage scientific research on and develop traditional and alternative health care systems that have direct impact on public health care". With this objective, the organization advocates for the continuation and legitimization of hilot. The ancient practice of the hilot has become a controversy in public health policy in the Philippines.

== See also ==
- Albularyo, a traditional Filipino herbalist
- Kulam, traditional Filipino witchcraft
- History of medicine in the Philippines
- Philippine shamans
- Folk medicine
