= Lihi =

Condition of pregnancy food craving in Philippine culture

In Philippine folk culture, lihí is a condition of pregnancy food craving. A notable characteristic is that pregnant women usually desire food such as sour, unripe mango with bagoong. While it is a cultural concept restricted among Filipinos, analogous cultural phenomena of pregnancy food cravings have been observed in various cultures. It is still debatable whether lihí can be classified and established as both a biological or psychological condition or a purely social and cultural one.

== Superstitions ==
Lihí also broadly encompasses a folk belief that whatever a woman craves during pregnancy will imprint characteristics on the child. The period of the lihi is usually the first trimester of the pregnancy. When a child resembles a manatee, for example, it is said that the mother liked looking at that particular animal during the gestational period. The lihi period is also believed to be a time when expectant mothers may be vulnerable to supernatural creatures that could play tricks on them. She might also develop a strong dislike for her husband.

In other regions, lihí refers to the belief that any sensory stimuli imbibed by a pregnant woman influences her child development. Among some ethnic groups in the northern Philippines, it is taboo to mention anything about animals such as rats or pigs near a pregnant woman for fear that her child may acquire the features of the mentioned animals.

== See also ==
- Food craving
