= Oomancy =

Divination by eggs

Oomancy (sometimes called ovomancy, ooscopy, oomancia, oomantia, ooscopia, or ovamancy) refers to divination by eggs. There are several methods to how this can be done, but an example would be the oracular reading (i.e., scrying) of the shapes that a separated egg white forms when dropped into hot water. This method greatly resembles molten lead divination, which ascribe meaning to the shapes and forms into which hot lead solidifies.

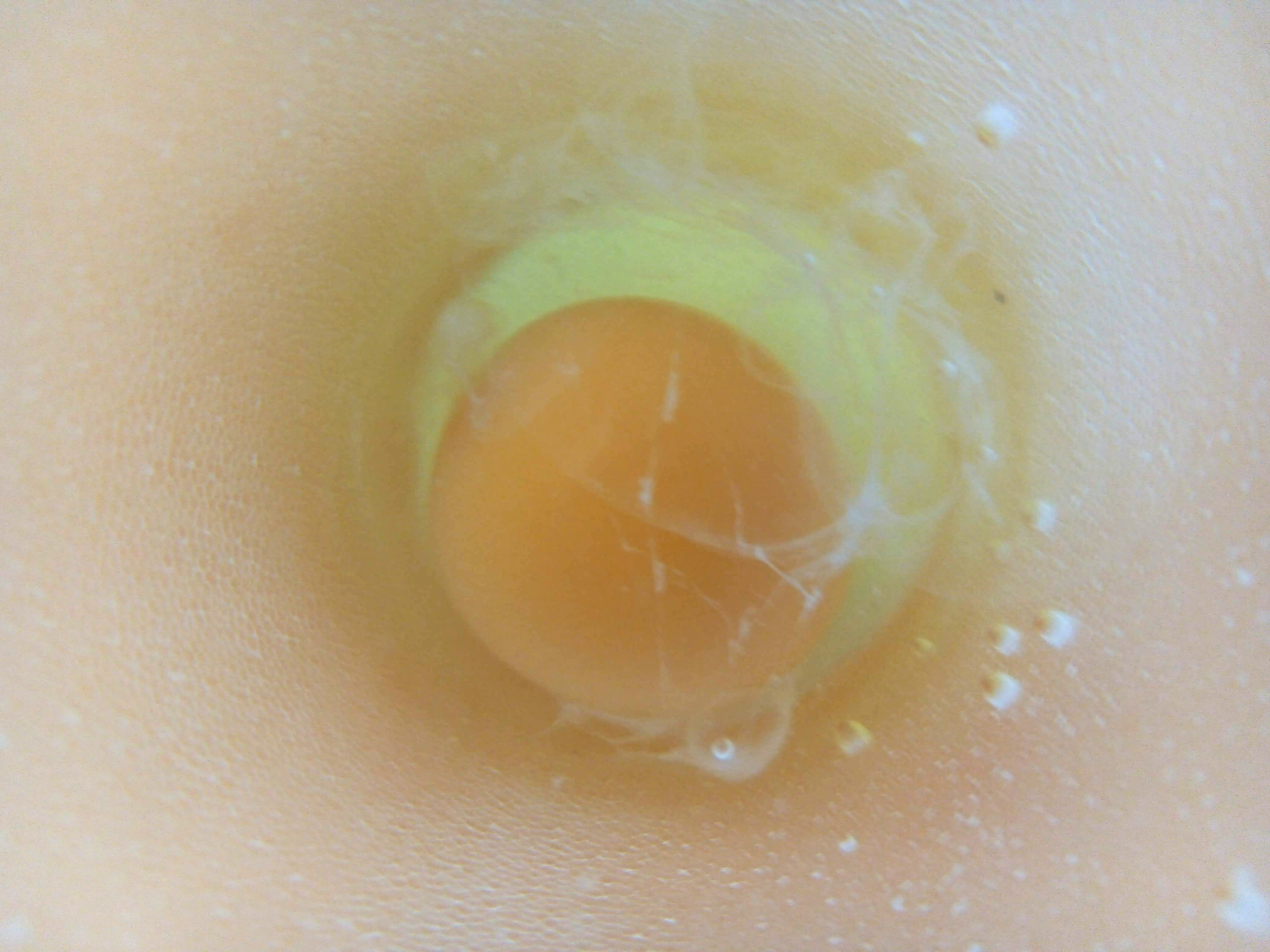
Egg after egg cleansing

== Origin ==
The word oomancy is derived from two Greek words, oon (an egg) and Manteia (divination), which literally translates into egg divination. Oomancy was a common form of divination practiced in ancient Greece and Rome, where it was believed that one could tell the future by interpreting the shapes formed when the separated whites from an egg was dropped into hot water.

For example: If the egg white resembled the shape of a bell, it would mean a wedding would be taking place soon. If the egg white resembled a snake, then it was considered a warning of danger.

== History ==
Although oomancy was thought to have originated in Greece, there is belief this practice was also used by ancient druids in Scotland as well.

Egg divination was often used to gain knowledge about children still in the womb, such as the gender, health, and due date of the unborn baby. In practice, they would rub an uncooked chicken egg on the pregnant mother's belly, then crack it into a saucer. If the broken egg contained one yolk, then the mother would give birth to one child. If the egg contained 2 yolks, 3 yolks, or more, this would indicate the mother would give birth to twin or triplets or so on. It was also believed that if the yolk contained spots of blood, it was a bad sign indicating a miscarriage or complications during birth. Another common method of oomancy in regards to the unborn child is to incubate a chicken egg between the pregnant woman's breasts. It was believed that when the chick hatched, its gender would reveal the gender of the mother's unborn child. There was also a form of oomancy that didn't involve cracking an egg open, but rather hard boiling it instead. On one end of the egg was written the name of a god or goddess, and on the other end was written a goal the person wished to achieve. The hard-boiled egg was then allowed to roll down a slope, and interpreted by which end was facing upward and what direction the egg was pointing.

Oomancy was a popular divination method used in New England in the late 17th century. Along with other young girls of Salem Village, Elizabeth Parris and Abigail Williams are known to have to played at reading omens by means of an egg and a mirror (or "Venus glass"), an apparently similar system of egg divination. It was reported by Reverend John Hale that these girls used eggs in a glass to learn the profession of their future husbands.

The Norse tradition of oomancy was to pierce the egg and blow the egg white out into a glass of water where it was left for a day. Then the diviner would use the egg glass to scry for answers to the question.

In 1806, Mary Bateman, also known as the "Yorkshire Witch," created a hoax known as The Prophet Hen of Leeds, in which eggs laid by a hen were purported to have written on them "Christ is coming"—a message believed to precede the end times. Three of these eggs were displayed by Bateman, but it was later found that she had written on the eggs using acid and reinserted them into the hen's oviduct.

== Oomancy and the Evil Eye ==
Often in history Oomancy would be performed on behalf of a client believed to have been affected by the evil eye. When performing this ritual, the egg is passed over the person's body or rolled upon the skin, then it is placed beneath the clients bed, upon the mantle, or on the altar. After a day, the egg is cracked into a glass or bowl half full of water and is then interpreted to see if the client has been given the evil eye.

== Modern uses and occult practices ==
Oomancy has become very popular in modern occult and new age traditions. Traditions such as Wicca, modern paganism, and modern witchcraft not only use eggs for divination but also for cleansing and removal of negative energies. It is a cultural tradition among Latin Americans to use oomancy to rid themself of the evil eye and brujeria done on them. This practice in Latin American countries dates back to the native Shamans and Africans brought over to the Americas

One way this can be done is to roll the egg all over a person's body so it can absorb the negative energy within the person. Then this egg is cracked open into a bowl of water where it can be interpreted as to whether or not the negativity has left the body. A modern-day variation of the hard boiled egg divination is to draw symbols on different spots of the egg shell that each indicate a different answer to the question being asked. After the egg is rolled down the slope, whatever symbol is facing up is considered the answer.

In parts of South and Southeast Asia, eggs are thrown onto the ground, and the shapes made upon impact are interpreted.

In Guatemala, eggs are used to diagnose illnesses by passing several eggs over the patient and placing them in water to be interpreted. This same technique has been used in Hoodoo traditions to treat the sick and injured.

== See also ==
- Tasseomancy (tea-leaf reading)
- List of egg topics
- Mary Bateman
