= Chashme Baddoor (slogan) =

Slogan used in North India and Pakistan to ward-off the evil eye

Chashm-e-Baddoor (Persian, Urdu: چشمِ بد دور, Hindi: चश्म-ए-बददूर) is a slogan extensively used in Iran, North India and Pakistan to ward-off the evil eye (which is called nazar in the region). It is a Persian language derivation which literally means "far be the evil eye".

== Associated icons ==
There are two icons (or nazar battu) that often appear in association with the slogan. One depicts a traditional Indo-Pakistani shoe (the jutti), which symbolizes a shoe being thrown at whoever is casting an evil eye. Another is a stylized mask that shows a demonic face with oversized canines and two horns. Sometimes, another slogan appears in conjunction with Chashme-Baddoor – Buri nazar waale, tera munh kala (बुरी नज़र वाले तेरा मुँह काला, بری نظر والے تیرا مُنہ کالا, "evil eyed one, your face will be blackened").

== Usage ==
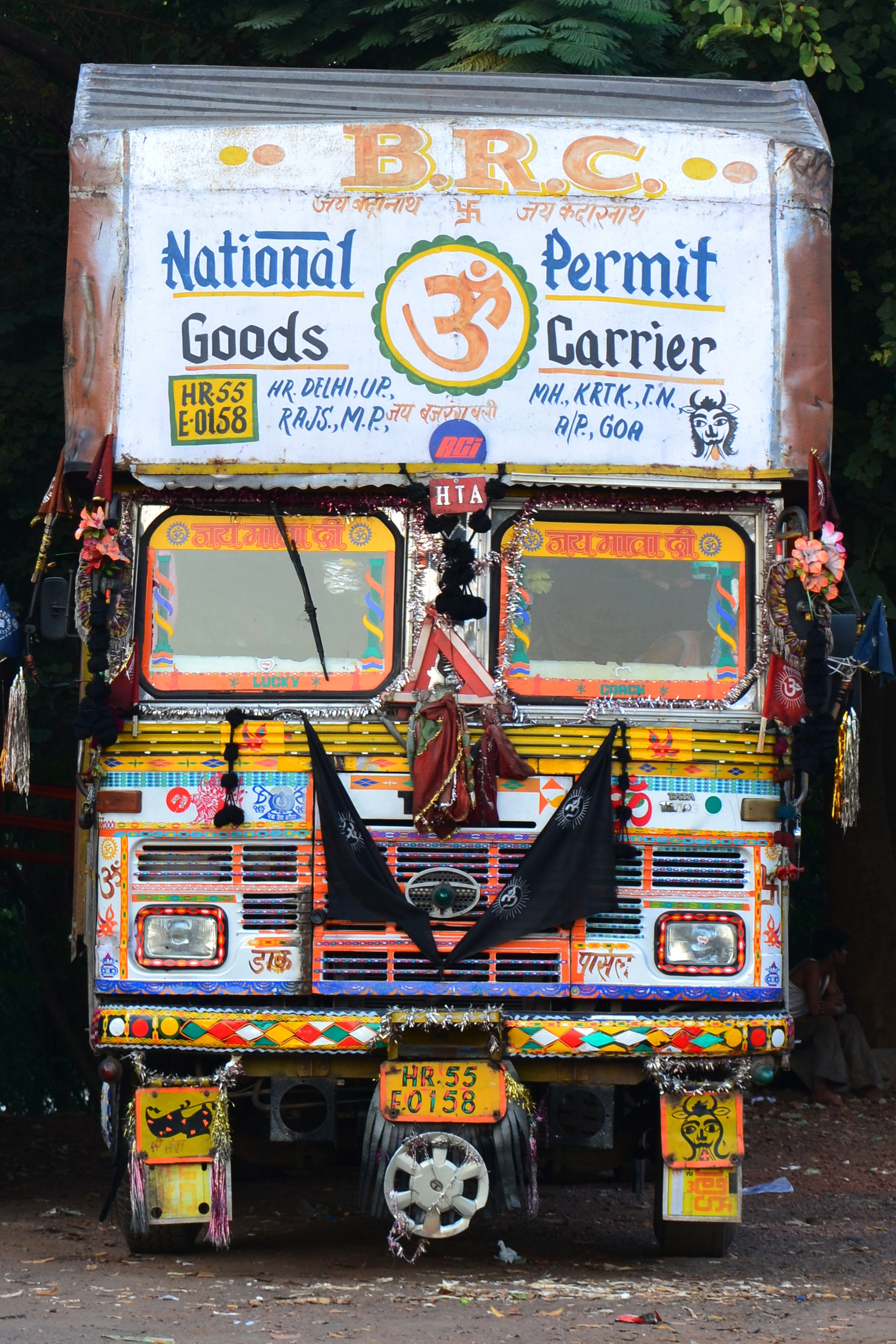
A decorated truck in India, showing a black jutti and nazar battu

The slogan is frequently uttered as a protective phrase when a loved one or friend succeeds, has good luck or otherwise receives praise, because those events are said to invite jealous attention. Chashme Baddoor and its associated icons are often seen as part of truck art in South Asia. It can also be seen in Indian and Pakistani homes, sometimes as an interwoven part of wall-hangings and other decorative art. The slogan is frequently used in popular media in the region, as in the 1981 Bollywood movie, Chashme Buddoor and in a song from the 1961 movie, Sasural – "Teri pyaari, pyaari soorat ko kisi ki nazar na lagey, Chashm-e-Baddoor."

== See also ==
- Evil eye
