= Antaeus (disambiguation) =

Antaeus was a giant of Libya in Greek and Berber mythology.

Antaeus may also refer to:

== Arts ==
- Antaeus (band), a French black metal band
- Antaeus (comics), two fictional characters from DC Comics
- Antaeus (magazine), a defunct American literary magazine
- "Antaeus" (short story), by Borden Deal

== Other uses ==
- Antaeus (physician), a doctor of ancient Greece
- Cocytius antaeus, a moth
- Antaeus (perfume), a fragrance for men produced by Chanel
- Antonov An-22 "Antaeus", a Soviet heavy transport aircraft
- Nemty, an Egyptian god
