= Painted pebbles =

Prehistoric painted pebbles are found from two unrelated cultures in Europe:

- The Epipalaeolithic Azilian (sometimes called the "Painted Pebble culture") of north Spain and southern France, some 14,000 to 10,000 years ago
- Pictish painted pebbles from north-east Scotland, some 1500 years ago
