= Charmstone =

Stone or mineral artifact of various types

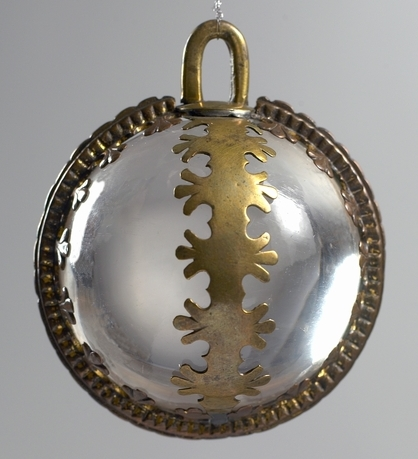
The "Archer-Butler Luck Stone", once owned by the Butler family of Garnavilla, near Cahir, County Tipperary, Ireland, was traditionally invoked to protect cattle from disease. It was dipped in drinking water or hung from the neck of a cow. The crystal ball, which weighs 200g, is mounted in a gilded copper or bronze frame with trefoil decoration and a hanging loop. Probably made in Ireland. Hunt Museum

A charmstone or coldstone is a stone or mineral artifact of various types associated with various traditional cultures, including those of Scotland and the native cultures of California and the American southwest. Typically they are elongated or cylindrical and have been shaped by grinding or other human activity, and may be perforated and/or grooved. They are thought to have been regarded as having some religious or magical function, including being talismans, amulets or charms.

Typically, references to American examples use the single word charmstone, while references to Scottish ones break the term as charm-stone or charm stone.

== Scotland ==
Scottish charm-stones are typically large smooth rounded pieces of rock crystal or other forms of quartz. They were credited with healing or quasi-magical powers, often through water that the charmstone had been dipped into, which was considered efficacious against various ills of both humans and farm animals. The Brooch of Lorn is an example of a charmstone set into a very elaborate brooch in the late 16th century, and worn by clan chiefs.

It is likely that Scottish painted pebbles, which have been dated to the period 200 AD to the eighth century AD (the Pictish period) also functioned as charm-stones, often known as cold-stones. Such stones were used within living memory (1971) against sickness in animals and humans. Robert Burns's Highland Mary is said to have been treated using charm-stones when she lay dying at Greenock in 1786. Some superstitious friends believed that her illness was due to someone casting the evil eye upon her; her father was urged to go to a place where two streams met, select seven smooth stones, boil them in milk, and treat her with the potion.

In the Life of St. Columba it is recorded that he visited King Bridei in Pictland in around the year 565 AD and took a white stone pebble from the River Ness which he blessed, so that any water it came into contact with would cure sick people. It is said to have floated in water and cured the king from a terminal illness. It remained as one of the great treasures of the king and cured many others. The belief in charm-stones is also well documented in medieval Iceland (Proc Soc Antiq Scot). Examples of such stones are held at National Museum of Rural Life, Kittochside, near East Kilbride, and the example set in the Lochbuy or Lochbuie Brooch is in the British Museum.

== Northern England ==
As late as the 19th century, stones from Ireland were considered efficacious against snake-bites in northern England, presumably because Ireland is famously free of snakes. Apparently any stone would do, so long as it came from Ireland; failing that, Irish sticks and Irish horse-teeth would work, and live cattle from Ireland were also believed to have active powers against snakes, to kill or paralyze them.

== Native American ==
Unlike fetishes they are not figural. Their purpose has been the subject of varying interpretations; researchers have speculated that they might have been fishing weights or have some other utilitarian purpose, but ethnographic research has tended towards the view that they have shamanistic or other ritual use. There have been attempts to establish a typology of charmstones according to form in hopes of providing chronological or cultural markers.

== See also ==
- Bezoar
- Madstone
- Toadstone
- Tongue stone
