= Borden Deal =

American writer

- Born: Loyse Youth Deal; October 12, 1922; Pontotoc, Mississippi, U.S.
- Died: January 22, 1985 (aged 62); Sarasota, Florida, U.S.
- Education: University of Alabama
- Occupation: Author
- Spouses: Lilian Slobotsky (1949–c.1950; divorced); Babs Hodges (1952–1975; divorced); Patricia Deal (m. 1984)
- Writing career
- Notable works: The Insolent Breed; Dunbar's Cove

Borden Deal (October 12, 1922 – January 22, 1985) was an American novelist and short story writer.

== Biography ==
Born Loysé Youth Deal in Pontotoc, Mississippi, Deal attended Macedonia Consolidated High School, after which he joined the Civilian Conservation Corps and fought forest fires in the Pacific Northwest. Before he began writing, he worked on a showboat, hauled sawdust for a lumber mill, harvested wheat, was an auditor for the United States Department of Labor, a telephone solicitor, copywriter, and an anti-aircraft fire control instructor in Fort Lauderdale, Florida.

In 1946, Deal enrolled in the University of Alabama in Tuscaloosa. While there he published his first short story, "Exodus". His creative writing professor was Hudson Strode. He received his Bachelor of Arts degree within three years, then enrolled in Mexico City College for graduate study.

It was not until 1956 that Deal decided to become a full-time writer. Among the pseudonyms he used were Loyse Deal, Lee Borden, Leigh Borden, and Michael Sunga.

Disney turned his story "For the Love of Willadean" into an episode of The Wonderful World of Color in 1964.

A prolific writer, Deal penned twenty-one novels and more than one hundred short stories, many of which appeared in McCall's, Collier's, Saturday Review, and Good Housekeeping. His work has been translated into twenty different languages. A major theme in his canon is man's mystical attachment to the earth and his quest for land, inspired by his family's loss of their property during the Great Depression. The majority of his work is set in the small hamlets of the Deep South. His novel The Insolent Breed served as the basis for the Broadway musical A Joyful Noise. His novel Dunbar's Cove was the basis for the plot of the film Wild River, starring Lee Remick and Montgomery Clift. From 1970 Deal also published, under the name "Anonymous", a series of erotic novels with pronoun titles such as Her and Him. However, after death, he is mostly remembered for his short story "Antaeus".

=== Personal life ===
Deal was married three times. He married his first wife, Lilian Slobotsky (variously Slobotzky), while studying in Mexico in 1949. According to one source, the couple had one daughter before the marriage ended in divorce. In 1952 he married his second wife, Babs Hodges (1929–2004), who was also a published author. They had one son and two daughters before divorcing in 1975. He was survived by his third wife, Patricia, whom he married in 1984.

=== Death ===
Deal died of a heart attack in Sarasota, Florida on January 22, 1985, aged 62.

== Legacy ==
The papers of Borden and Babs Hodges Deal are held at Boston University.

== Bibliography ==
- Walk Through the Valley, 1956
- Dunbar's Cove, 1957
- Search for Surrender, 1957
- Killer in the Mansion, 1957
- Secret of Sylvia, 1958 (as Lee Borden)
- The Insolent Breed, 1959
- Dragon's Wine, 1960
- The Devil's Whisper, 1961 (as Lee Borden)
- The Spangled Road, 1962
- Antaeus, 1962
- The Loser (New South Saga #1), 1964
- The Tobacco Men, 1965
- A Long Way to Go, 1965
- The Advocate (New South Saga #2), 1968
- Interstate, 1970
- A Neo-Socratic Dialogue on the Reluctant Empire, 1971
- The Winner (New South Saga #3), 1973
- The Other Room, 1974
- Bluegrass, 1976
- Legend of the Bluegrass, 1977 (as Leigh Borden)
- Adventure, 1978
- The Taste of Watermelon, 1979
- There Were Also Strangers, 1985
- The Platinum Man, 1986
