= Wild River (film) =

1960 American drama film

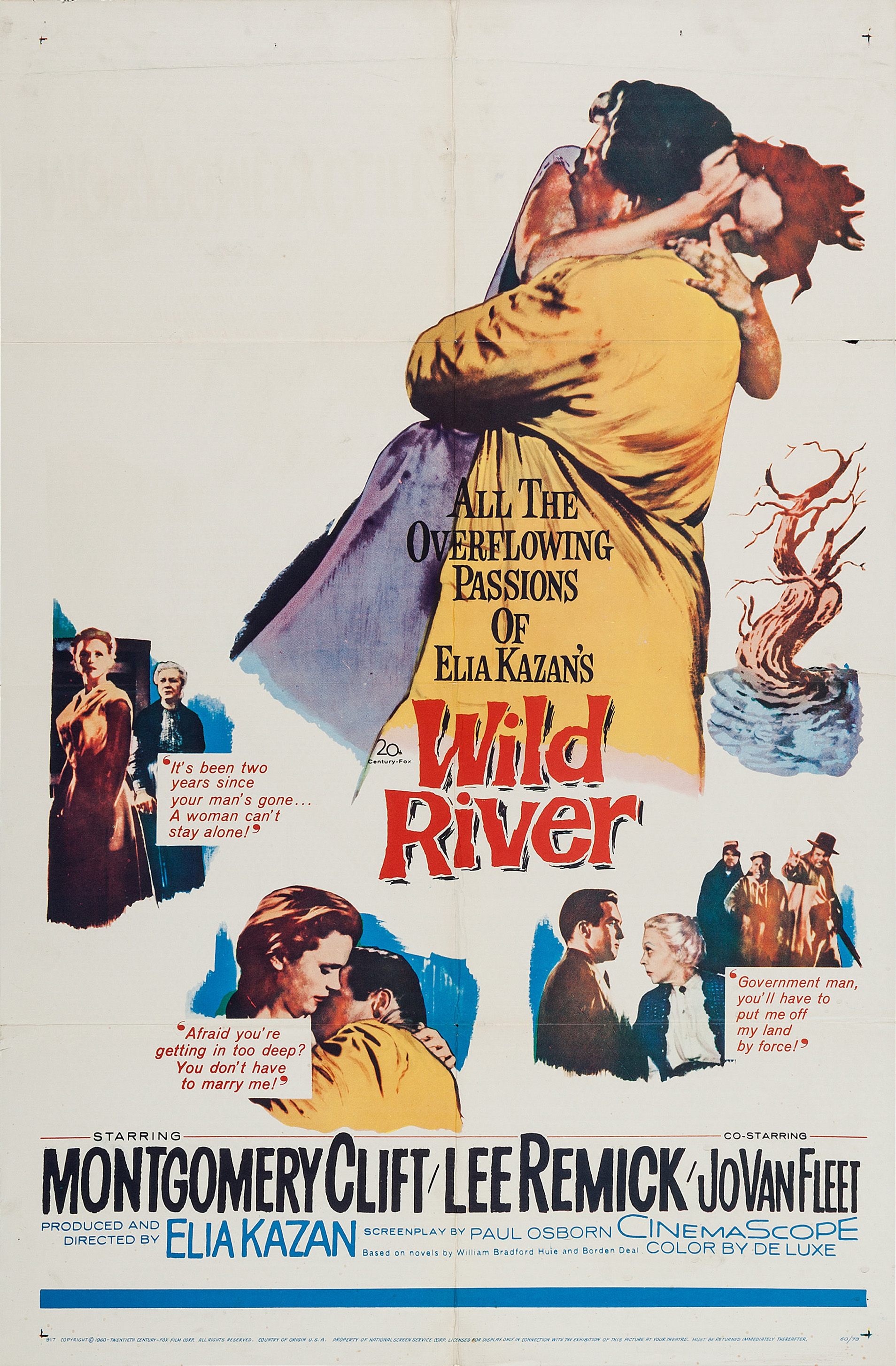
- Theatrical release poster
- Directed by: Elia Kazan
- Screenplay by: Paul Osborn
- Based on: Dunbar's Cove; 1957 novel by: Borden Deal Mud on the Stars 1942 novel; William Bradford Huie
- Produced by: Elia Kazan
- Starring: Montgomery Clift; Lee Remick; Jo Van Fleet
- Cinematography: Ellsworth Fredricks
- Edited by: William H. Reynolds
- Music by: Kenyon Hopkins
- Color process: Color by DeLuxe
- Production company: 20th Century Fox
- Distributed by: 20th Century Fox
- Release date: May 25, 1960
- Running time: 110 minutes
- Country: United States
- Language: English
- Budget: $1,595,000

Wild River is a 1960 American drama film directed by Elia Kazan, and starring Montgomery Clift, Lee Remick, and Jo Van Fleet. It was filmed in the Tennessee Valley, and was adapted by Paul Osborn from two novels: Borden Deal's Dunbar's Cove and William Bradford Huie's Mud on the Stars, drawing for plot from Deal's story of a battle of wills between the nascent Tennessee Valley Authority and generations-old land owners, and from Huie's study of a rural Southern matriarchal family for characters and their reaction to destruction of their land, and the controversial employment methods of African-American laborers by the TVA. It marked Bruce Dern's film debut. In 2002, The film was selected for preservation in the National Film Registry by the Library of Congress.

== Plot ==
In 1937, Chuck Glover (Montgomery Clift), the new head of the Tennessee Valley Authority's (TVA) land purchasing office, arrives in Garthville, Tennessee, a town located upstream from a new hydroelectric dam.

Glover is supervising the clearing of the land to be flooded. His first need is to acquire Garth Island on the Tennessee River. Elderly Ella Garth (Jo Van Fleet), matriarch of a large family that has lived on the island for decades, refuses to sell. To avoid bad publicity, the TVA wants to acquire the island without force.

Clearing the land is behind schedule because the mayor uses only white labor. Chuck goes to Garth Island, but Ella and the other Garth women, including Ella's granddaughter Carol Baldwin (Lee Remick), ignore him. Glover tries reasoning with Ella's three adult sons, Hamilton (Jay C. Flippen), Cal (James Westerfield), and Joe John (Big Joe Bess in an uncredited role), but relocating means their having to work for a living.

Chuck is forced to leave, but Hamilton later invites him back to speak with Ella. Chuck finds Ella criticizing President Franklin D. Roosevelt and his New Deal to her black farm hands and their families. Chuck stresses the benefits the dam will bring, but Ella denounces dams and the taming of rivers as going "against nature." Ella then shows Chuck the family cemetery on the island's highest point.

Chuck learns that Carol is a widow with two small children. She returned to the island after her husband died. She is expected to marry Walter Clark (Frank Overton), a local businessman. Chuck advises her against marrying if she does not love him. He then addresses the farmhands about working for the TVA, reasoning their leaving the island will force Ella to sell. Carol invites Chuck to her former home off the island. They spend the night together and are soon falling in love.

The mayor opposes Chuck's hiring "colored labor", saying it will cause problems with white workers. Chuck is urged to create segregated work gangs and pay black workers less. Chuck refuses despite receiving veiled threats.

Carol and Chuck spend another night together, unaware that Walter Clark has seen them. The next morning Ella's workers and their families leave the island. Ella remains alone except for her field hand, Sam, who loyally refuses to go. Ella knows about Carol and Chuck. When Carol begs her grandmother to stay at her house, she orders her off the island.

R. J. Bailey (Albert Salmi), a cotton farmer whose black sharecroppers are quitting to work for the TVA, agrees to help scare Chuck from seeing Carol. Walter lures Chuck to his hotel room where Bailey is waiting. After Chuck treats him decently regarding their rivalry for Carol, Walter warns Chuck about Bailey.

Bailey, awaiting with his shotgun in Chuck's hotel room, tells Chuck a story. It seems that one of Bailey's workers left his employ as a sharecropper to work for the TVA for $5 per day, as opposed to the $2 per day he made working for Bailey. Infuriated, Bailey found a stick of wood about two inches thick, kidnapped the worker, brought him back to his farm, and beat him senseless. The employee, now realizing he is enslaved to Bailey, cannot return to the fields for two days, as he recovers from the beating.

For the aforementioned trouble Chuck caused him, Bailey states that Chuck owes him $4, for the $2 per day in value of lost labor due to the recovery time of the employee. When Chuck refuses, Bailey beats him and takes the money.

Soon after, Chuck and Walter go to the island to see Ella. Chuck admits misunderstanding her fight to protect her dignity. The following day, Chuck learns that the dam's flood gates will be closed in a few days and Ella must be evicted immediately.

Chuck rejects Hamilton and Cal's idea to have Ella declared legally incompetent so they can sell the land. He reluctantly asks the U.S. Marshals to forcibly remove Ella the next day, then goes to the island in a final attempt to persuade her to voluntarily leave. She refuses.

Carol wants to go with Chuck when he moves on to his next assignment, though he remains unsure. Walter arrives to warn them that Bailey and his men are coming to terrorize them.

While the local sheriff stands aside, believing the good ol' boys are harmless, the thugs shoot out a window, overturn Chuck's car, and drive Walter's truck into the side of the house. Refusing to be driven off, Chuck confronts Bailey but is knocked unconscious. Several other people then stand up to Bailey, including Carol (whom he also punches), Walter, and even Bailey's friend Jack (who objects to him hitting a woman), but he knocks them all down in turn. Only then does the sheriff run off Bailey and his thugs.

Chuck and Carol marry. The next day, with Chuck and Carol present, Ella is evicted from the island as her former workers fell the trees. At her new home, Ella sits on the porch, refusing to speak.

Soon after, Carol tells Chuck that Ella just died. Before leaving the valley, Chuck and Carol join her family and former workers to bury Ella in the family plot, the only part of Garth Island above water in the new reservoir.

== Cast ==
- Montgomery Clift as Chuck Glover
- Lee Remick as Carol Garth Baldwin
- Jo Van Fleet as Ella Garth
- Albert Salmi as R.J. Bailey
- Jay C. Flippen as Hamilton Garth
- James Westerfield as Cal Garth
- Barbara Loden as Betty Jackson
- Frank Overton as Walter Clark
- Malcolm Atterbury as Sy Moore
- Bruce Dern as Jack Roper (uncredited)
- Robert Earl Jones as Sam Johnson (uncredited)
- Chester Dewayne Payne as little boy in food line

== Production ==
A script was written by Ben Maddow but he refused credit because none of it was used in the final film.

Coon Denton Island on the Hiwassee River, in northern Bradley County, Tennessee, upriver from Charleston, served as the fictional Garth Island, and the city of Charleston's old business district served as the fictional city of Garthville. A peninsula northwest of Cleveland, Tennessee, on Chickamauga Lake, was used, and a studio for interior shooting was created in the Cleveland armory. A few other locations in rural Bradley County near Charleston were also used. Principal photography began on October 19, 1959. On January 3, 1960, Kazan left for his New York home, and filming was completed over the following week.

== Reception ==
Variety wrote:

Wild River is an important motion picture. In studying a slice of national socio-economic progress (the Tennessee Valley Authority of the early 1930s) in terms of people (those who enforced vs those who resisted), it catches something timeless and essential in the human spirit and shapes it in the American image.

In The New York Times, A. H. Weiler wrote:

[Kazan] profited by taking his troupe down to Charleston, Tenn., the Hiwassee River, from which you can see the Great Smokies, and the town of Cleveland on Lake Chickamauga to capture authenticity. The cameras of cinematographer Ellsworth Fredericks have brought to life the charm of the rolling, wooded countryside.

== Preservation ==
The film was preserved by the Academy Film Archive.
