= Babs Hodges Deal =

American writer

Babs Hodges Deal (June 23, 1929 – February 20, 2004) was an American writer. She published a dozen novels and numerous short stories. Her novel Fancy's Knell received an award from Mystery Writers of America. She adapted her short story "Make my Deathbed" for an episode of Alfred Hitchcock Presents, and she also adapted her novel The Walls Came Tumbling Down for the TV movie Friendships, Secrets and Lies.

== Biography ==
Born on June 23, 1929, in Scottsboro, Alabama, Babs Hodges worked as a clerk and typist after high school. In 1952, she received her B.A. from the University of Alabama. That same year she married Borden Deal, who she had met at the university. Initially stayed home with their children in support of her husband's writing, by 1959 Babs Deal launched her own literary career with the publication of her first novel, Acres of Afternoon. Living 7 years in Tuscaloosa, Alabama, the two moved to Sarasota, Florida, in 1964, where they were involved in the literary community. In 1975 Babs and Borden divorced, and she moved to Gulf Shores, Alabama. Babs Hodges Deal eventually published 12 novels over a 20-year period. In 2004, she died in Montgomery, Alabama of complications from a recent illness.

== Publications ==
- 1959: Acres of Afternoon. New York: David McKay Company.
- 1961: It's Always Three O'Clock. New York: David McKay Company.
- 1962: Night Story. New York: David McKay Company.
- 1964: The Grail. New York: David McKay Company.
- 1966: Fancy's Knell. Garden City, New York: Doubleday.
- 1968: The Walls Came Tumbling Down. Garden City, New York: Doubleday.
- 1969: Summer Games. Garden City, New York: Doubleday.
- 1969: High Lonesome World. Garden City, New York: Doubleday.
- 1973: The Crystal Mouse. Garden City, New York: Doubleday.
- 1974: The Reason for Roses. Garden City, New York: Doubleday.
- 1975: Waiting to Hear from William. Garden City, New York: Doubleday.
- 1978: Goodnight, Ladies. Garden City, New York: Doubleday.
