= Rabies in popular culture =

Depiction of viral disease in the arts

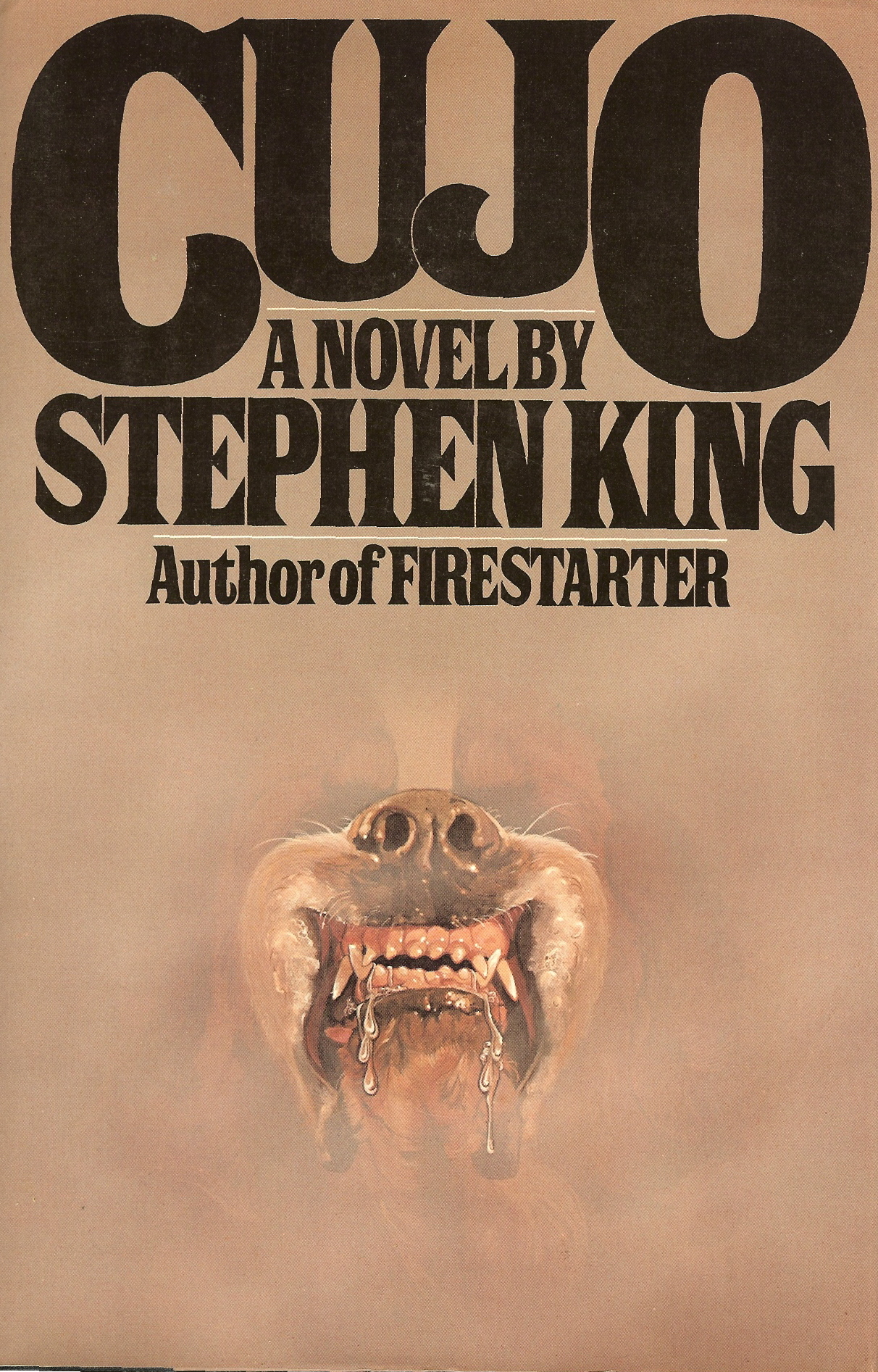
In the 1981 novel Cujo by Stephen King, a rabid St. Bernard spreads terror in the small town.

Rabies has been the main plot device or a significant theme in many fictional works. Due to the long history of the virus as well as its neurotropic nature, rabies has been a potent symbol of madness, irrationalism, or an unstoppable plague in numerous fictional works, in many genres. Many notable examples are listed below.

== Examples ==
=== In films ===
(Chronological, then alphabetical within years)

- The Lighthouse Keepers (1929), a film directed by Jean Grémillon, based on a play
- Rabies (1958), a film directed by Ingmar Bergman
- In the classic film Rage (1966), starring Glenn Ford and Stella Stevens, a doctor in rural Mexico is infected with rabies and desperately struggles to return to civilization and seek treatment. A major scene in the film shows a rabid man exhibiting symptoms being restrained by locals.
- I Drink Your Blood (1970; also known as Hydro-Phobia) is a cult horror film about a gang of Satanic hippies who get infected with rabies.
- In the horror film Rabid (1977) starring Marilyn Chambers, a critically injured woman receives plastic surgery that treats some of her intact tissue to become morphogenetically neutral, in hopes that tissue grafts to fire-damaged areas of her body will differentiate and replace the damaged skin and organs. Instead, the woman becomes a parasitic monster whose victims transform into rabid zombies whose bites spread the disease.
- Desperate Living (1977), a dark comedy film directed by John Waters. Set in a fictional slum of 1970s Baltimore, the film ends with Queen Carlotta (Edith Massey) infecting all her denizens with rabies. She is, however, overthrown. The lot of the denizens remains unknown.
- Paris Trout (1991), a drama film directed by Stephen Gyllenhaal. Set in 1940s rural Georgia, the film begins with a young girl being bitten by a rabid fox.
- In 28 Days Later (2002), a horror film set in post-apocalyptic Britain, an artificial virus called "Rage" causes humans to become frenzied and uncontrollably aggressive. The virus exhibits similar features to rabies, with discoloration of the eyes, unpredictable behavior, the urge to bite, and the spread of the virus through saliva. While the behaviour of the infected characters in the film was modeled after the effects of advanced rabies in humans, the comic book 28 Days Later: The Aftermath states that the virus is, in fact, a carrier of ebola mixed with a calming agent that went rogue.
- [●REC] (2007), is a zombie horror film in which an apartment building is quarantined after the breakout of an unknown virus (a strain of rabies).
- In Quarantine (2008), a Hollywood remake of the Spanish horror movie REC about a mutated variation of rabies, an apartment building is quarantined after an outbreak of an unknown virus. One resident of the building, a veterinarian, suspects it is a case of rabies.
- In the animated film Fantastic Mr. Fox (2009), based on Roald Dahl's famous 1970 children's novel of the same name, Spitz the beagle is shown to have rabies.
- In the movie The Crazies (2010), a small town in Iowa is infected with a biochemically modified form of the family Rhabdoviridae released accidentally by the United States Army. However, in the movie, the RNA virus begins as a water-borne pathogen, and there is speculation that the virus may have mutated into an air-borne pathogen.
- In Marmaduke (2010), the character Chupadogra (Buster) (voiced by Sam Elliott) was believed to have rabies and ate his owner, however later in the film, it is shown to be false.
- Rabies (2010 film), an Israeli film by Aharon Keshales and Navot Papushado
- In Trollhunter (2011), a movie about college students following a government trollhunter, the trolls have been infected with rabies, causing them to behave erratically.
- In The Barrens (2012), Stephen Moyer's character Richard has been bitten by his rabid dog. Richard suffers from the final symptoms of rabies as he and his family are camping in the New Jersey Pine Barrens and being stalked by the legendary Jersey Devil.

=== In literature ===
(Alphabetical, by first author's surname)

- In K. A. Applegate and ghostwriter Emily Costello's novel The Journey (2000), book 42 of the Animorphs children's book series, one of the main characters, Marco, is bitten by a rabid dog while attempting to retrieve a camera from an apartment. Marco begins to experience early symptoms of the virus, but when he morphs into a cockroach, the virus is destroyed.
- In Max Brooks' post-apocalyptic horror novel, World War Z: An Oral History of the Zombie War (2006), the virus that turns people into zombies is at first thought to be a mutated strain of rabies, and is called "African rabies" throughout the earlier chapters.
- In Rita Mae Brown and Sneaky Pie Brown's "Whisker of Evil", a live rabies virus is used as a murder weapon.
- Fred Gipson and illustrator Carl Burger's children's novel Old Yeller (1956) and its 1957 film adaptation depicts the namesake protagonist, an frontier dog, succumbing to furious rabies after a fight with a rabid Texas gray wolf.
- In Zora Neale Hurston's novel Their Eyes Were Watching God (1937), the character Tea Cake becomes infected with rabies from a dog bite.
- In Stephen King's psychological horror novel Cujo (1981), and 1983 film adaptation, a mother and son are terrorized by a St. Bernard infected with furious rabies.
- In Joe R. Lansdale's novel Bad Chili (1997), one of the protagonists is bitten by a rabid squirrel.
- Harper Lee's novel To Kill a Mockingbird (1960) uses the imagery of a rabid dog to represent the prejudices of the town of Maycomb, Alabama.
- In Daniel P. Mannix and illustrator John Schoenherr's novel The Fox and the Hound (1967), a rabid fox attacks a group of children.
- Gabriel García Márquez's novel Of Love and Other Demons (1994) is a love story between Sierva María de Todos los Ángeles, the protagonist who is bitten by a rabid dog on her 12th birthday, and Father Cayetano Delaura, who is sent to exorcise her.
- David Morrell's novel The Totem (1979) centers on a northwestern town that is terrorized by humans and animals infected with a (fictitious) variant of the rabies virus, which does not kill the infected, but does affect their minds and physiology (leading characters in the book to speculate that victims of this virus were the origin of the werewolf myth).
- In Chuck Palahniuk's novel Rant: An Oral Biography of Buster Casey (2007), the main character infects those around him with rabies.
- Borislav Pekić's horror-thriller novel Besnilo (1983; in English: Rabies) is about a genetically engineered rabies virus with a double protein envelope, thus extremely easy to transmit (biting is not necessary any more), which spreads from one victim to another extremely fast. The virus gets turned loose at the London's Heathrow Airport.
- Malayattoor Ramakrishnan's novel Verukal (1966) vividly describes a death from rabies when, in a side plot, the character Ramu dies of the disease.
- Yuriy Shcherbak's documentary novel Prychyny i naslidky (1986; in English: Causes and Consequences) about the struggle against rabies in Ukraine.
- Wilbur Smith's novel When the Lion Feeds (1964) describes in harrowing detail the events ensuing from one of the main characters' death following a bite from a rabid jackal.
- Vikas Swarup's novel Q & A (2005) devotes one chapter to a rabies epidemic in Agra, during which the main character's new friend contracts rabies from a dog bite and dies. The main character tries to save him, but is unable to obtain the money needed for a vaccine.

=== In music ===
==== Albums ====
- Rabies (Skinny Puppy album) (1989), an album by Skinny Puppy
- Rabies (Ruoska album) (2008), an album by Ruoska

==== Songs ====
- "Rabies" (1982), a song by NWBHM band Witchfinder General
- "Sunset Babies (All Got Rabies)", a song from Alice Cooper's album, Dirty Diamonds (2005)

=== In television ===
(Alphabetical, by series title) Many television series have dedicated at least one episode to storylines involving rabies infected entities.

- 1000 Ways to Die, is a television series which, in Episode 39 ("The One About Dumb People Dying"), told a story about a taxidermist who contracts the disease from an infected squirrel.
- The Beavis and Butt-Head episode "Rabies Scare" has Beavis get bitten by a rabid dog. He bites antacid tablets to simulate foaming at the mouth.
- In Blue Mountain State Season 1, linebacker Thad Castle admits to using rabies as a performance enhancer because it gives him the same competitive edge as steroids but is undetectable to the NCAA's tests. Runningback Craig Shilo later shoots up with Thad's rabies before a competition with a prospective freshman runningback.
- Bonanza, in Season 12, episode 25, titled "A Time to Die", Ben's friend, April Christopher, gets bitten by a rabid wolf.
- In "The Fury" story arc of the Nordic Noir television series Bordertown, Season 1, an illegal dog fighting ring forces female athletes to fight dogs that have been deliberately infected with rabies.
- In the Season 27 episode of the BBC TV series Casualty, titled "If Not For You", a dog-bite patient is suspected to be suffering from rabies contracted through a corneal transplant performed in Algeria, causing a rare case where a human may have given a dog rabies.
- In the Criminal Minds Season 9 episode "Rabid", a sadistic kidnapper intentionally infects his victims with rabies and derives pleasure from videotaping their subsequent violent behavior.
- In the CSI: Crime Scene Investigation Season 9 episode, "The Gone Dead Train", the CSIs are brought in to investigate a series of deaths tied in with rabies.
- In the Season 4 episode of Dr. Quinn: Medicine Woman, called "Brother's Keeper", Ingrid (the fiancée of a main character) contracts rabies and dies as a result.
- In Season 13 of ER, a young boy contracts rabies.
- Happiness revolves around the residents of an apartment building dealing with a new virus called "Lytta virus", which causes a rabies-like rage that leads to infectious bite wounds. Some of the infected people are placed in induced coma or in cold rooms to slow the progression of the virus, similar to the Milwaukee Protocol for rabies treatment.
- In a season 4 episode of ITV's Heartbeat, entitled "Mid Day Sun", a family smuggles their rabies-infected dog into the UK and a garage worker dies, resulting in a search across the North Yorkshire Moors for the rabid animal and its eventual shooting.
- In the Season Two Highway Patrol episode "Rabies", Chief Mathews and the Highway Patrol have to find a young girl who was bitten by a dog at a gas station when the dog later displays the signs of rabies four days after the bite. After an urgent search complicated by the girl and her widowed mother making frequent random stops in rural areas while traveling on vacation, Mathews and an accompanying doctor eventually find the girl and successfully inoculate her against the rabies virus.
- In Home Movies, Season 1, Episode 4 ("Brendon Gets Rabies"), vacationing neighbors leave their cat to be watched while out of town. The cat eventually escapes and is later found in a rabid state. The cat then bites Brendon while he attempts to catch it, and both are rushed off to the veterinarian for intensive care.
- In a Season 1 episode of House M.D., titled "Histories", Dr. Gregory House works to diagnose a homeless woman's illness, and it turns out she is infected with rabies from an untreated bat bite.
- In King of the Hill, Season 4, Episode 9 ("To Kill a Ladybird"), a paranoid Dale Gribble runs away in the woods, afraid that he may have been infected with rabies by a raccoon.
- In Letterkenny, Season 1, Episode 5 ("Rave"), an opossum bites Daryl when he tries to capture it, infecting him with rabies.
- A dog bites Radar in the Season 3 M*A*S*H episode, "Mad Dogs and Servicemen".
- The Season 5 episode of Scrubs, titled "My Lunch", deals with the death of three patients resulting from organ transplants from an infected patient.
- In Seinfeld, Season 5, Episode 3: "The Glasses", Elaine is bitten by a strange dog, has trouble communicating with the doctor about whether she should get a shot, and later suspects she has rabies when she has difficulty swallowing.
- In the Series 3, Episode 4 of Survivors (1975 TV series), titled "Mad Dog" (April 6, 1977), a man who saves Charles from an attack by a pack of feral dogs discovers he is infected and begins exhibiting signs of furious rabies
- In Season 1, Episode 6 of ITV's The Grand, John Bannerman and Clive Evans are bitten by a dog suspected of having rabies.
- In the 1983 BBC TV series The Mad Death, Britain is gripped by an outbreak of rabies after an afflicted pet cat is illegally smuggled into the country.
- In the Season 4 premiere of The Office, Michael Scott, after running Meredith Palmer over with his car, finds out she may have been infected with rabies after she tells a doctor she had been bitten by a bat, raccoon, and a rat (all in separate instances). To detract from his own negligence, he organizes "Michael Scott's Dunder Mifflin Scranton Meredith Palmer Memorial Celebrity Rabies Awareness Pro-Am Fun Run Race For the Cure" in her honor.

=== In video games ===
- Left 4 Dead and Left 4 Dead 2 by Valve are both set during an apocalyptic pandemic caused by a rabies-like virus that infects humans and causes them to attack any non-infected on sight.
- Dying Light, Dying Light 2 and Dying Light: The Beast by Techland are set during an apocalyptic pandemic caused by a mutated strain of the Rabies virus that causes severe aggression and loss of cognitive function in the infected, turning them into hosts for the virus
