= Rabies =

Deadly viral disease, transmitted through animals

- Other names: Hydrophobia
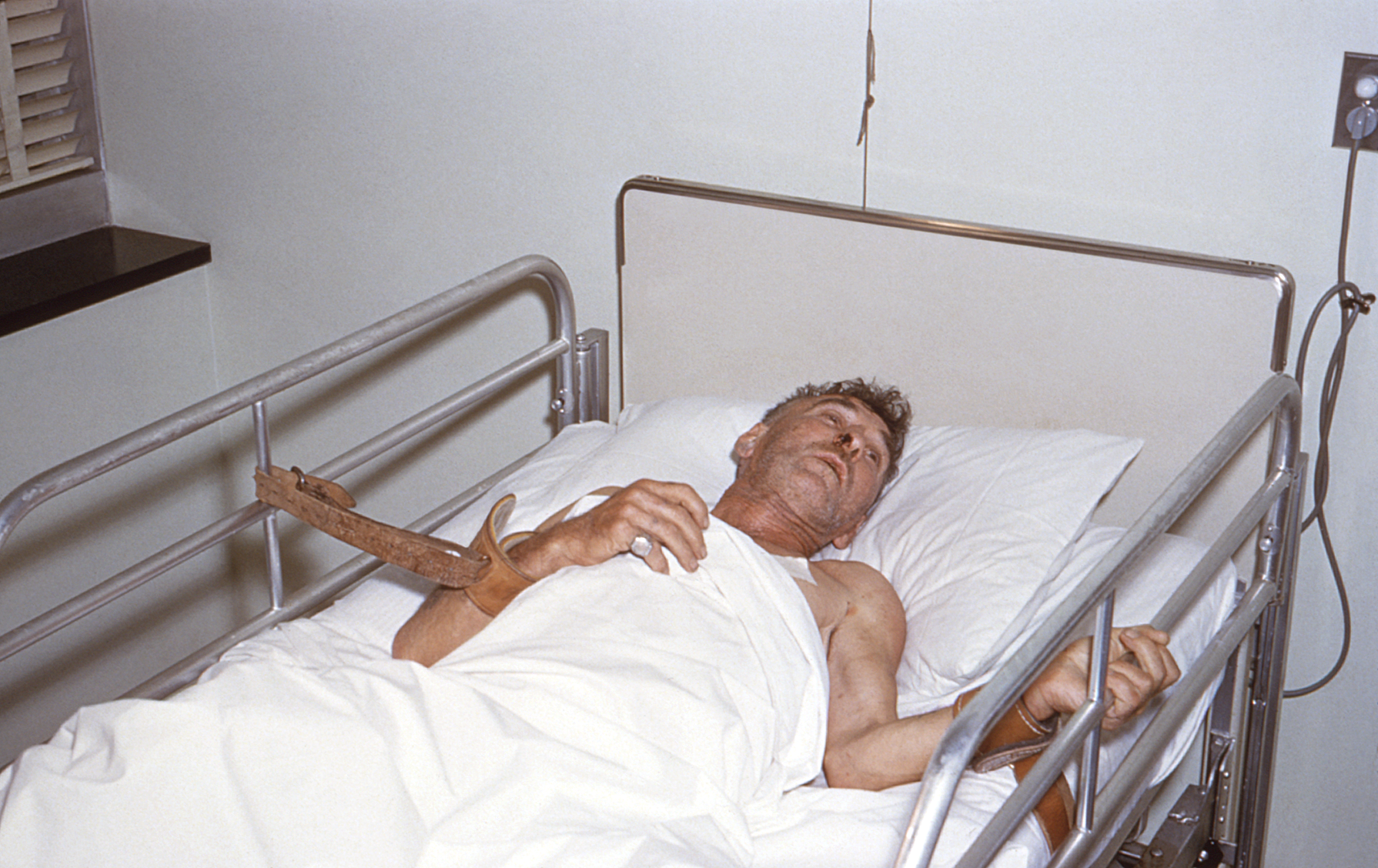
- A man with rabies, 1958
- Specialty: Infectious disease, neurology, palliative care, critical care medicine
- Symptoms: Fever, extreme aversion to water, confusion, excessive salivary secretion, hallucinations, disrupted sleep, paralysis, coma, hyperactivity, headache, nausea, vomiting, anxiety
- Causes: Lyssaviruses
- Prevention: Rabies vaccine, animal control, rabies immunoglobulin
- Treatment: Supportive care
- Medication: Incurable
- Prognosis: Almost 100% fatal after onset of symptoms
- Deaths: 59,000 per year

Rabies is a viral disease that causes inflammation of the brain in humans and other mammals. Early symptoms can include fever and abnormal sensations at the site of exposure. This is followed by one or more of: violent movements, uncontrolled excitement, fear of water, inability to move parts of the body, confusion, and loss of consciousness. Once symptoms appear, the result is virtually always death. The time period between contracting the infection and the start of symptoms is usually one to three months but can vary from less than one week to more than one year. The time depends on the distance the virus must travel along peripheral nerves to reach the central nervous system.

Rabies is caused by lyssaviruses, including the rabies virus and Australian bat lyssavirus. It is spread when an infected animal bites or scratches another animal or a human. Even in the absence of a bite or a scratch, saliva from an infected animal coming into contact with the eyes, mouth, or nose can transmit rabies. Rabies can also be transmitted through tears and nervous tissues. Globally, dogs are the most common animal involved. In countries where dogs commonly have the disease, more than 99% of rabies cases in humans are the direct result of dog bites. In the Americas, bat bites are the most common source in humans, and less than 5% of cases are from dogs. Rodents are very rarely infected with rabies. The disease can be diagnosed only after the start of symptoms, but prompt preventative treatment is recommended for anyone who has had contact with a rabid animal.

Animal control and vaccination programs have decreased the risk of rabies from dogs in a number of regions of the world. Immunizing people before they are exposed is recommended for those at high risk, including those who work with bats or who spend prolonged periods in areas of the world where rabies is common. In people who have been exposed to rabies, the rabies vaccine and sometimes rabies immunoglobulin are effective in preventing the disease if the person receives the treatment before the start of rabies symptoms. Washing bites and scratches for 15 minutes with soap and water, povidone-iodine, or detergent may reduce the number of viral particles and may be somewhat effective at preventing transmission. As of 2016, only fourteen people were documented to have survived a rabies infection after showing symptoms.

Rabies causes about 59,000 human deaths worldwide per year. More than 95% of cases occur in Africa and Asia, and about 40% are in children under the age of 15. Rabies is present in more than 150 countries and on all continents but Antarctica. More than 3 billion people live in regions of the world where rabies occurs. A number of countries, including Australia and Japan, as well as much of Western Europe, do not have rabies among dogs. Many Pacific islands are rabies-free. It is classified as a neglected tropical disease. The global cost is estimated at US$8.6 billion per year in lost lives, medical care, and associated costs, besides the psychological trauma.

== Signs and symptoms ==
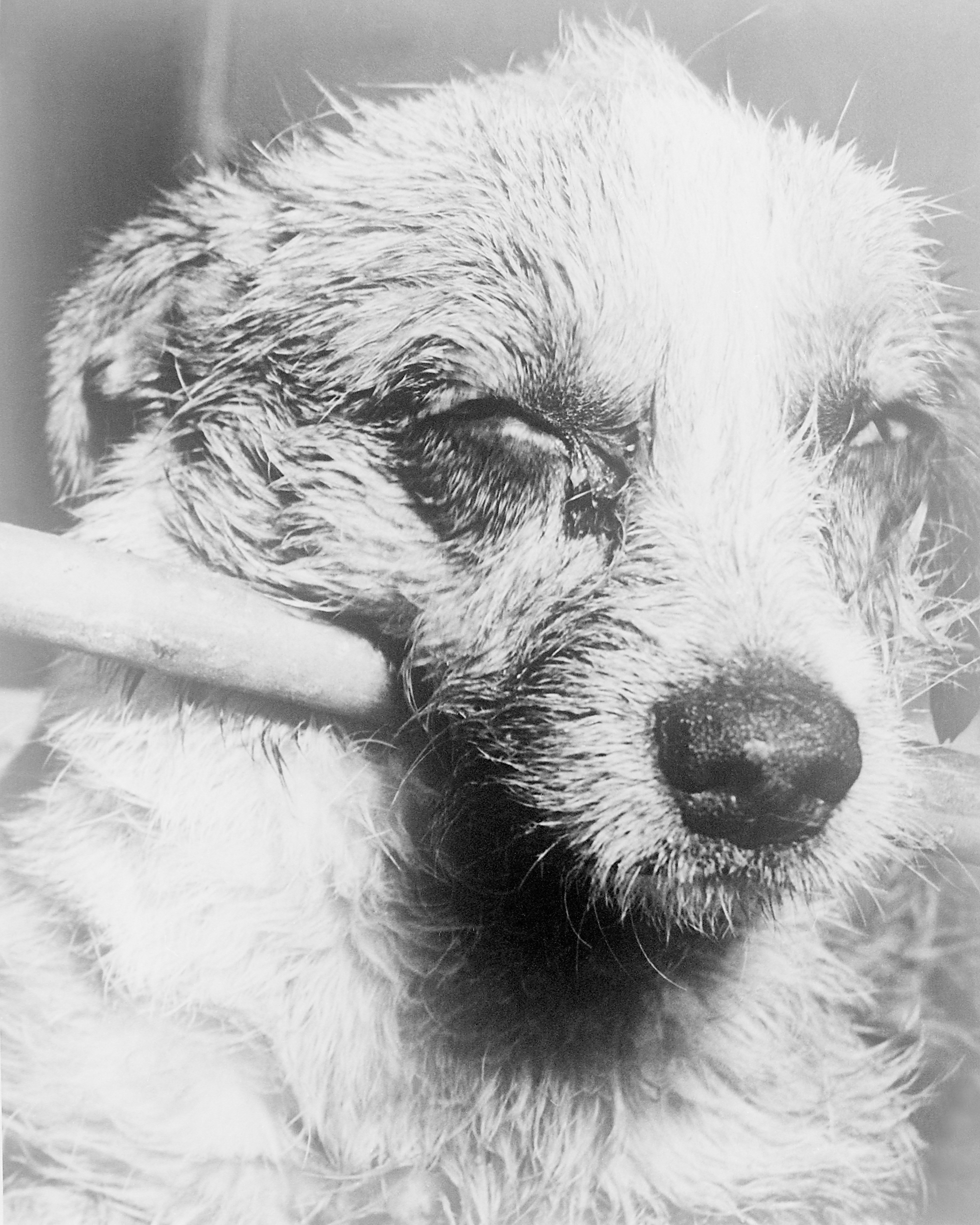
Animals with "dumb" rabies appear depressed, lethargic, and uncoordinated

The time between infection and the first symptoms is typically one to three months in humans. Initial symptoms of rabies are often nonspecific, such as fever and headache. As rabies progresses and causes inflammation of the brain and meninges, symptoms can include slight or partial paralysis, anxiety, insomnia, confusion, agitation, abnormal behavior, paranoia, terror, and hallucinations. The infected person may also fear drinking water.

The symptoms eventually progress to delirium and coma. Death usually occurs two to ten days after first symptoms. Survival is almost unknown once symptoms have presented, even with intensive care.

Man with rabies displaying hydrophobia

Two forms of the disease are recognized, furious rabies and dumb rabies. The furious form affects 80% of rabies victims. This form of rabies causes irrational aggression in the host, which aids in the spreading of the virus through animal bites. This form of rabies has also been called hydrophobia ("fear of water"; see also aquaphobia) throughout its history. In the later stages of a furious infection, the victim has difficulty swallowing, often panics when presented with liquids to drink, and cannot quench their thirst. Saliva production is greatly increased, and attempts to drink, or even the intention or suggestion of drinking, may cause excruciatingly painful spasms of the muscles in the throat and larynx. Since the victim cannot swallow saliva and water, the virus has a much higher chance of being transmitted, because it multiplies and accumulates in the salivary glands and is transmitted through biting. Such overproduction of saliva and inability to swallow it may cause "foaming at the mouth," much associated with rabies in the public perception and in popular culture.

The remaining 20% often experience the dumb form, a progressive paralytic condition marked by muscular weakness, loss of sensation, and paresis that resembles Guillain–Barré syndrome in its symptomatology. This form of rabies does not usually cause fear of water.

== Cause ==
=== Virus ===
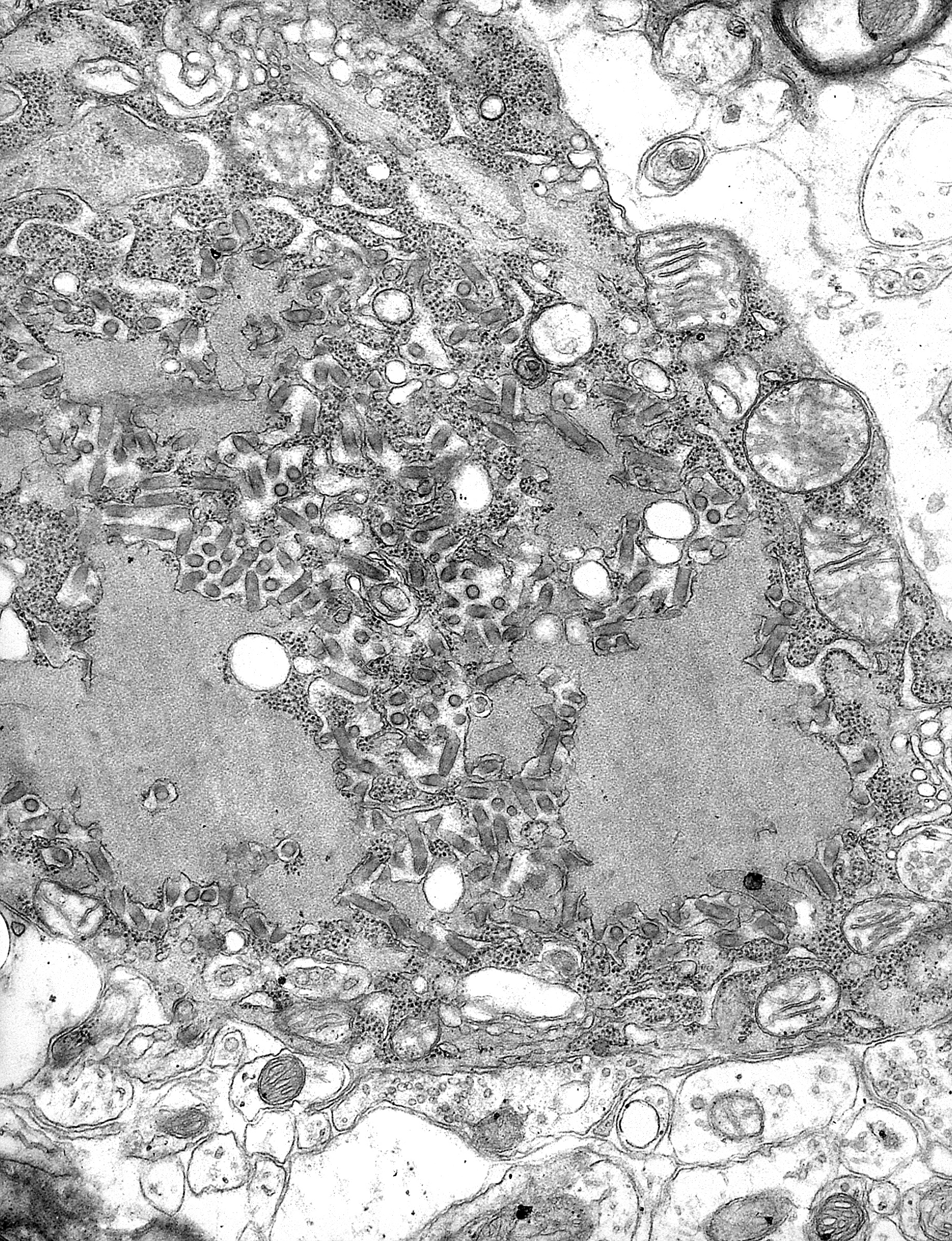
TEM micrograph with numerous rabies virions (small, dark grey, rodlike particles) and Negri bodies (the larger pathognomonic cellular inclusions of rabies infection)

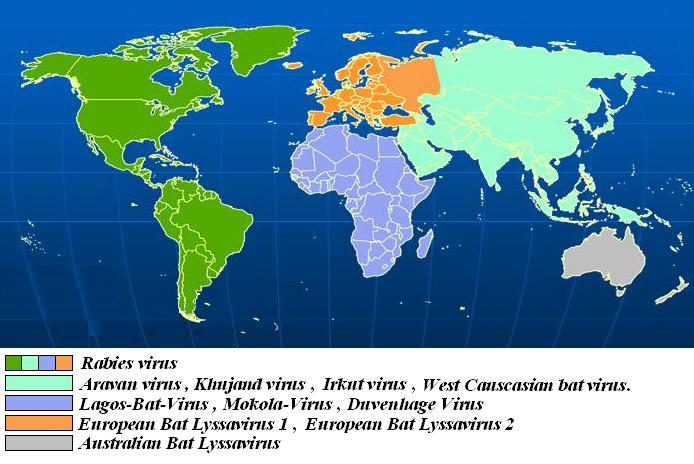
Geographical distribution of lyssaviruses carried by bats

Rabies is caused by a number of lyssaviruses including the rabies virus and Australian bat lyssavirus. Duvenhage lyssavirus may cause a rabies-like infection.

The rabies virus is the type species of the Lyssavirus genus, in the family Rhabdoviridae, order Mononegavirales. Lyssavirions have helical symmetry, with a length of about 180 nm and a cross-section of about 75 nm. These virions are enveloped and have a single-stranded RNA genome with negative sense. The genetic information is packed as a ribonucleoprotein complex in which RNA is tightly bound by the viral nucleoprotein. The RNA genome of the virus encodes five genes whose order is highly conserved: nucleoprotein (N), phosphoprotein (P), matrix protein (M), glycoprotein (G), and the viral RNA polymerase (L).

To enter cells, trimeric spikes on the exterior of the membrane of the virus interact with a specific cell receptor, the most likely one being the acetylcholine receptor. The cellular membrane pinches in a procession known as pinocytosis and allows entry of the virus into the cell by way of an endosome. The virus then uses the acidic environment, which is necessary, of that endosome and binds to its membrane simultaneously, releasing its five proteins and single-strand RNA into the cytoplasm.

Once within a muscle or nerve cell, the virus undergoes replication. The L protein then transcribes five mRNA strands and a positive strand of RNA all from the original negative strand RNA using free nucleotides in the cytoplasm. These five mRNA strands are then translated into their corresponding proteins (P, L, N, G and M proteins) at free ribosomes in the cytoplasm. Some proteins require post-translational modifications. For example, the G protein travels through the rough endoplasmic reticulum, where it undergoes further folding, and is then transported to the Golgi apparatus, where a sugar group is added to it (glycosylation).

When there are enough viral proteins, the viral polymerase will begin to synthesize new negative strands of RNA from the template of the positive-strand RNA. These negative strands will then form complexes with the N, P, L and M proteins and then travel to the inner membrane of the cell, where a G protein has embedded itself in the membrane. The G protein then coils around the N-P-L-M complex of proteins taking some of the host cell membrane with it, which will form the new outer envelope of the virus particle. The virus then buds from the cell.

From the point of entry, the virus is neurotropic, traveling along the neural pathways into the central nervous system. The virus usually first infects muscle cells close to the site of infection, where they are able to replicate without being 'noticed' by the host's immune system. Once enough virus has been replicated, they begin to bind to acetylcholine receptors at the neuromuscular junction. The virus then travels through the nerve cell axon via retrograde transport, as its P protein interacts with dynein, a protein present in the cytoplasm of nerve cells. Once the virus reaches the cell body it travels rapidly to the central nervous system (CNS), replicating in motor neurons and eventually reaching the brain. After the brain is infected, the virus travels centrifugally to the peripheral and autonomic nervous systems, eventually migrating to the salivary glands, where it is ready to be transmitted to the next host.

=== Transmission ===
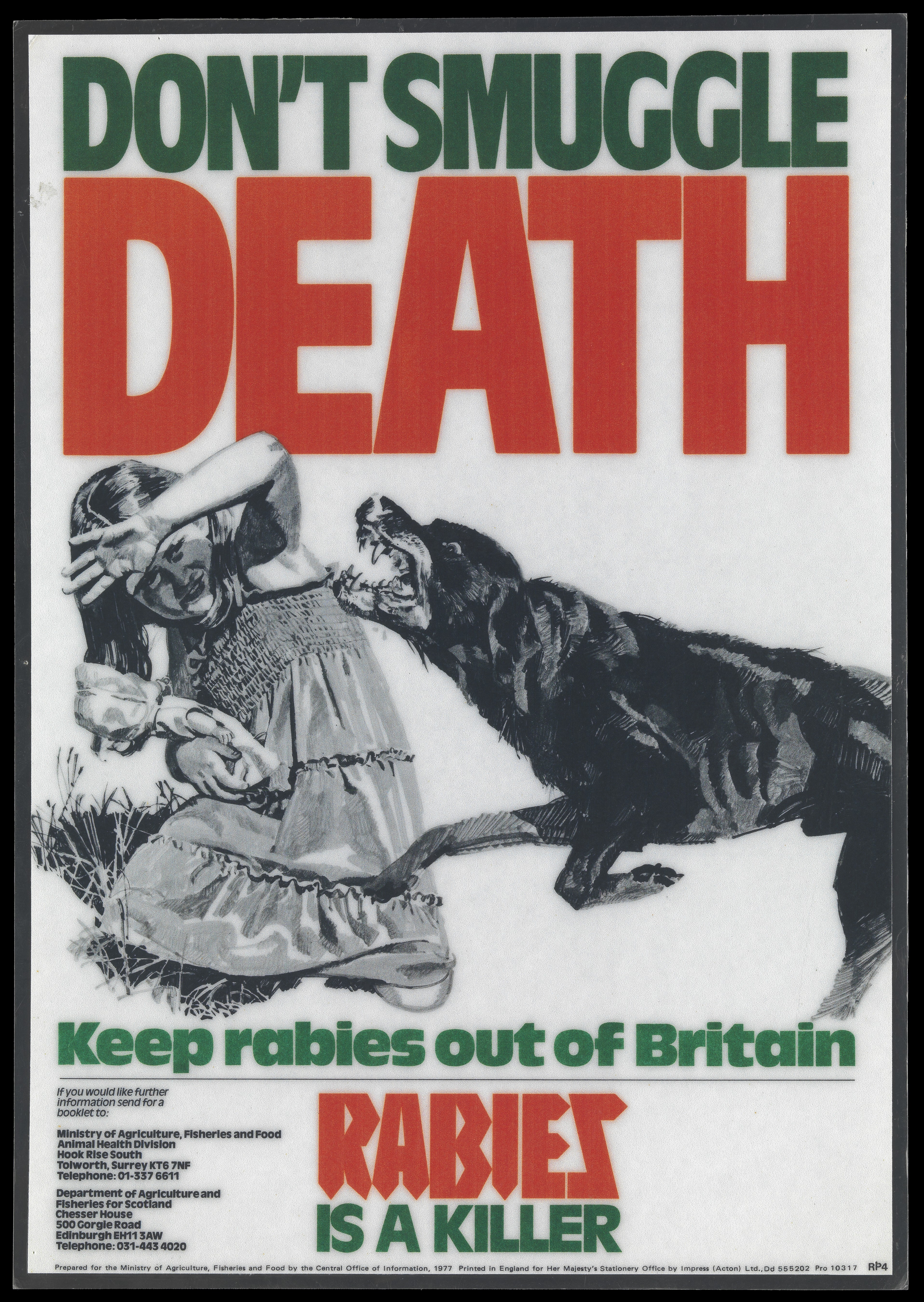
British rabies prevention poster, 1977

All warm-blooded species, including humans, may become infected with the rabies virus, which has also adapted to grow in cells of cold-blooded vertebrates. Birds were first artificially infected with rabies in 1884; however, infected birds are largely, if not wholly, asymptomatic, and recover. Some bird species have been known to develop rabies antibodies, a sign of infection, after feeding on rabies-infected mammals.

Most animals can be infected by the virus and can transmit the disease to humans. Worldwide, however, about 99% of human rabies cases come from dogs. Other sources of rabies in humans include bats, monkeys, raccoons, foxes, skunks, cattle, wolves, coyotes, cats, and mongooses (normally either the small Asian mongoose or the yellow mongoose).

Rabies may also spread through exposure to infected bears, domestic farm animals, groundhogs, weasels, and other wild carnivorans. However, lagomorphs, such as hares and rabbits, and small rodents, such as chipmunks, gerbils, guinea pigs, hamsters, mice, rats, and squirrels, are almost never found to be infected with rabies and are not known to transmit rabies to humans. Bites from mice, rats, or squirrels rarely require rabies prevention because these rodents are typically killed by any encounter with a larger, rabid animal, and would, therefore, not be carriers. Non-placental mammals such as the Virginia opossum, a marsupial, have a lower body temperature than similarly-sized placentals and so tend to resist the rabies virus, which thrives at a higher temperature, although they are not immune to it. In 2024, rabies was found to be spreading in South African Cape fur seals, possibly making it the first outbreak documented in marine mammals.

The virus is usually present in the nerves and saliva of a symptomatic rabid animal. The route of infection is usually, but not always, by a bite. In many cases, the infected animal is exceptionally aggressive, may attack without provocation, and exhibits otherwise uncharacteristic behavior. This is an example of a viral pathogen modifying the behavior of its host to facilitate its transmission to other hosts. After a typical human infection by bite, the virus enters the peripheral nervous system. It then travels retrograde along the efferent nerves toward the central nervous system. During this phase, the virus cannot be easily detected within the host, and vaccination may still confer cell-mediated immunity to prevent symptomatic rabies. When the virus reaches the brain, it rapidly causes encephalitis, the prodromal phase, which is the beginning of the symptoms. Once the patient becomes symptomatic, treatment is almost never effective and mortality is over 99%. Rabies may also inflame the spinal cord, producing transverse myelitis.

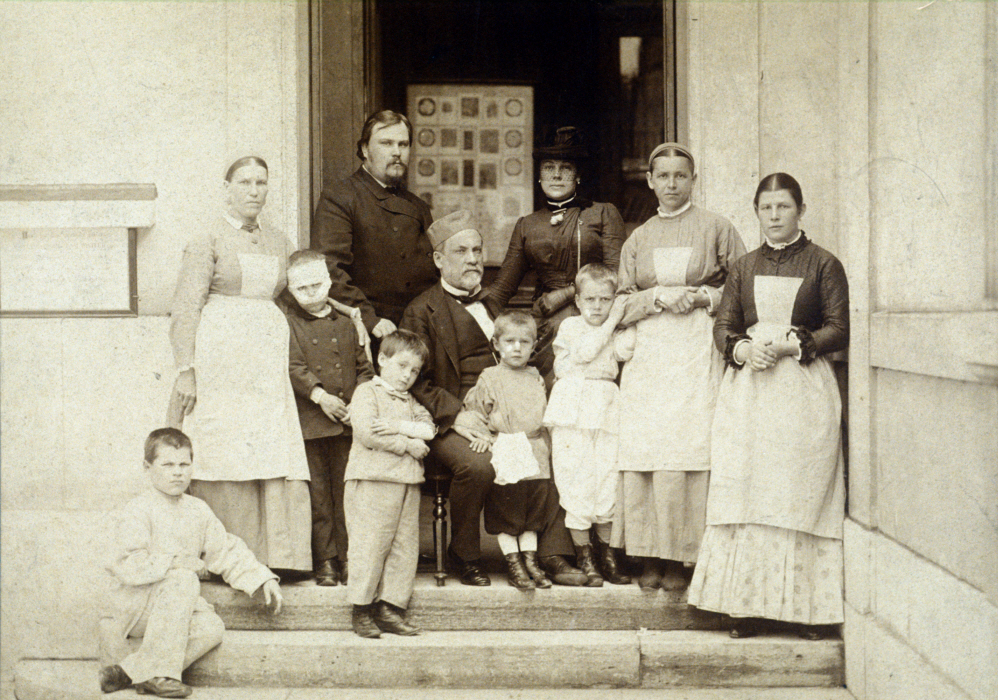
Louis Pasteur and Russian physician Leonid Ivanovich Voinov (standing), with Russian children who had been bitten by a rabid wolf and treated for rabies in Paris in 1886

Although it is theoretically possible for humans to transmit rabies by biting, no such cases have been documented, because infected humans are usually hospitalized and isolated by the time their saliva becomes infectious, and severe neurological weakness and dysfunction often make effective biting difficult. Casual contact, such as touching a person with rabies or contact with non-infectious fluid or tissue (urine, blood, feces), does not constitute an exposure and does not require post-exposure prophylaxis. As the virus is present in sperm and vaginal secretions, it might be possible for rabies to spread through sex. There are only a small number of recorded cases of human-to-human transmission of rabies, and all occurred through organ transplants, most frequently corneal transplantation, from infected donors.

Spread by unpasteurized milk from an infected animal is theoretically possible, although not supported by scientific empirical evidence, which excludes anecdotes.

== Diagnosis ==
Rabies can be difficult to diagnose because, in the early stages, it is easily confused with other diseases or even with a simple aggressive temperament. The reference method for diagnosing rabies is the fluorescent antibody test (FAT), an immunohistochemistry procedure, which is recommended by the World Health Organization (WHO). The FAT relies on the ability of a detector molecule (usually fluorescein isothiocyanate) coupled with a rabies-specific antibody, forming a conjugate, to bind to and allow the visualisation of rabies antigen using fluorescent microscopy techniques. Microscopic analysis of samples is the only direct method that allows for the identification of rabies virus-specific antigen in a short time and at a reduced cost, irrespective of geographical origin and status of the host. It has to be regarded as the first step in diagnostic procedures for all laboratories. Autolysed samples can, however, reduce the sensitivity and specificity of the FAT. The RT PCR assays have proven to be a sensitive and specific tool for routine diagnostic purposes, particularly in decomposed samples or archival specimens. The diagnosis can be reliably made from brain samples taken after death. The diagnosis can also be made from saliva, urine, and cerebrospinal fluid samples, but this is not as sensitive or reliable as brain samples. Cerebral inclusion bodies called Negri bodies are 100% diagnostic for rabies infection but are found in only about 80% of cases. If possible, the animal from which the bite was received should also be examined for rabies.

Some light microscopy techniques may also be used to diagnose rabies at a tenth of the cost of traditional fluorescence microscopy techniques, allowing identification of the disease in less-developed countries. A test for rabies, known as LN34, is easier to run on a dead animal's brain and might help determine who does and does not need post-exposure prevention. The test was developed by the Centers for Disease Control and Prevention (CDC) in 2018.

The differential diagnosis in a case of suspected human rabies may initially include any cause of encephalitis, in particular infection with viruses such as herpesviruses, enteroviruses, and arboviruses such as West Nile virus. The most important viruses to rule out are herpes simplex virus type one, varicella zoster virus, and (less commonly) enteroviruses, including coxsackieviruses, echoviruses, polioviruses, and human enteroviruses 68 to 71.

== Prevention ==
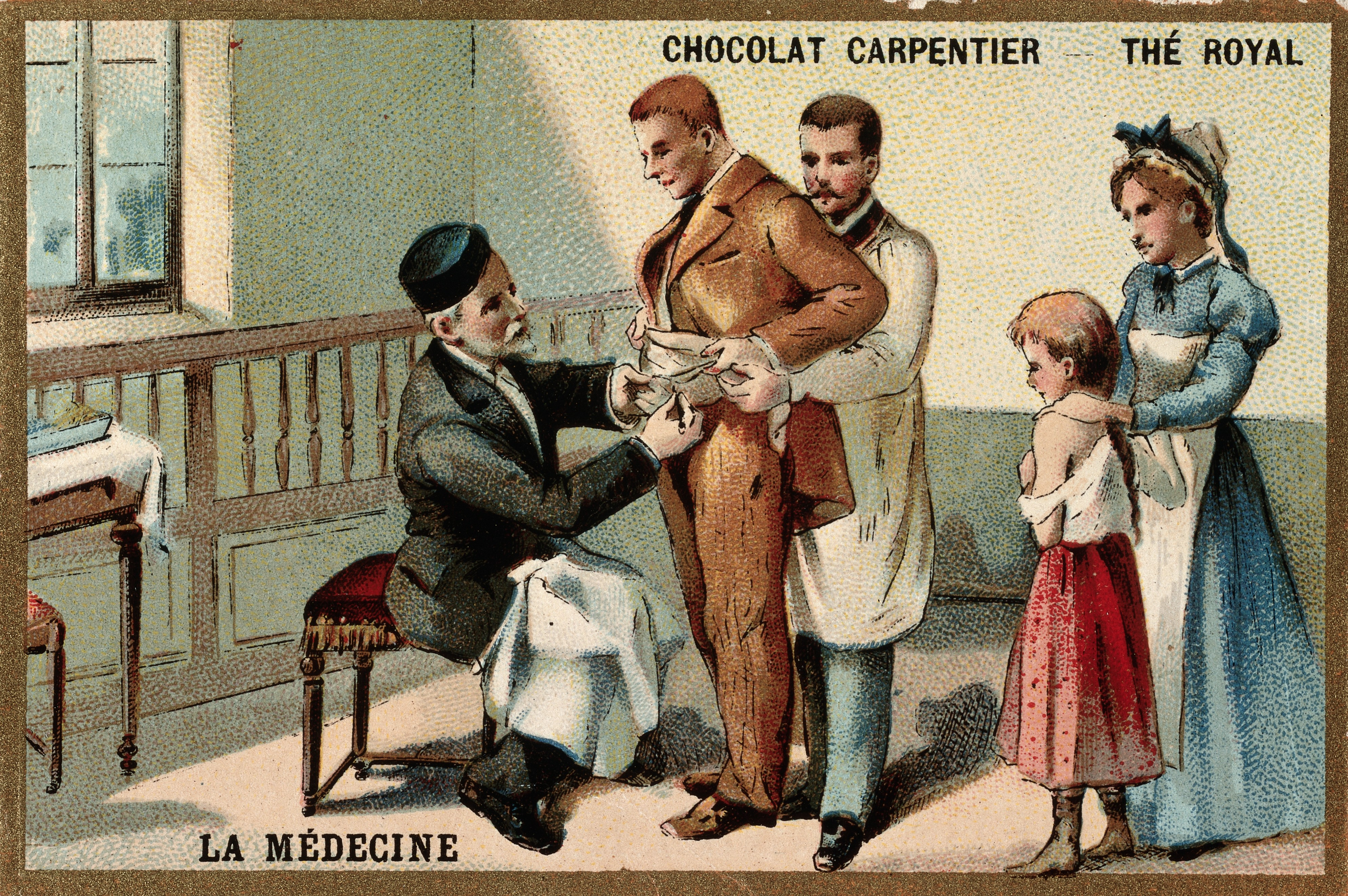
Louis Pasteur inoculating a man against rabies

Almost all human exposure to rabies was fatal until a vaccine was developed in 1885 by Louis Pasteur and Émile Roux. Their original vaccine was harvested from infected rabbits, from which the virus in the nerve tissue was weakened by allowing it to dry for five to ten days. Similar nerve tissue-derived vaccines are still used in some countries, as they are much cheaper than modern cell culture vaccines.

The human diploid cell rabies vaccine was started in 1967. Less expensive purified chicken embryo cell vaccine and purified vero cell rabies vaccine are now available. A recombinant vaccine called V-RG has been used in Belgium, France, Germany, and the United States to prevent outbreaks of rabies in undomesticated animals. Immunization before exposure has been used in both human and nonhuman populations, where, as in many jurisdictions, domesticated animals are required to be vaccinated.

The Missouri Department of Health and Senior Services Communicable Disease Surveillance 2007 Annual Report states the following can help reduce the risk of contracting rabies:

- Vaccinating dogs, cats, and ferrets against rabies
- Keeping pets under supervision
- Not handling wild animals or strays
- Contacting an animal control officer upon observing a wild animal or a stray, especially if the animal is acting strangely
- If bitten by an animal, washing the wound with soap and water for 10 to 15 minutes and contacting a healthcare provider to determine if post-exposure prophylaxis is required

28 September is World Rabies Day, which promotes the information, prevention, and elimination of the disease.

In Asia and in parts of the Americas and Africa, dogs remain the principal host. Mandatory vaccination of animals is less effective in rural areas. Especially in developing countries, pets may not be privately kept and their destruction may be unacceptable. Oral vaccines can be safely distributed in baits, a practice that has successfully reduced rabies in rural areas of Canada, Europe, and the United States. In Montreal, Quebec, Canada, baits are successfully used on raccoons in the Mount-Royal Park area. Vaccination campaigns may be expensive, but cost-benefit analysis suggests baits may be a cost-effective method of control. In Ontario, a dramatic drop in rabies was recorded when an aerial bait-vaccination campaign was launched.

The number of recorded human deaths from rabies in the United States has dropped from 100 or more annually in the early 20th century to one or two per year because of widespread vaccination of domestic dogs and cats and the development of human vaccines and immunoglobulin treatments. Most deaths now result from bat bites, which may go unnoticed by the victim and hence untreated.

== Treatment ==
=== After exposure ===
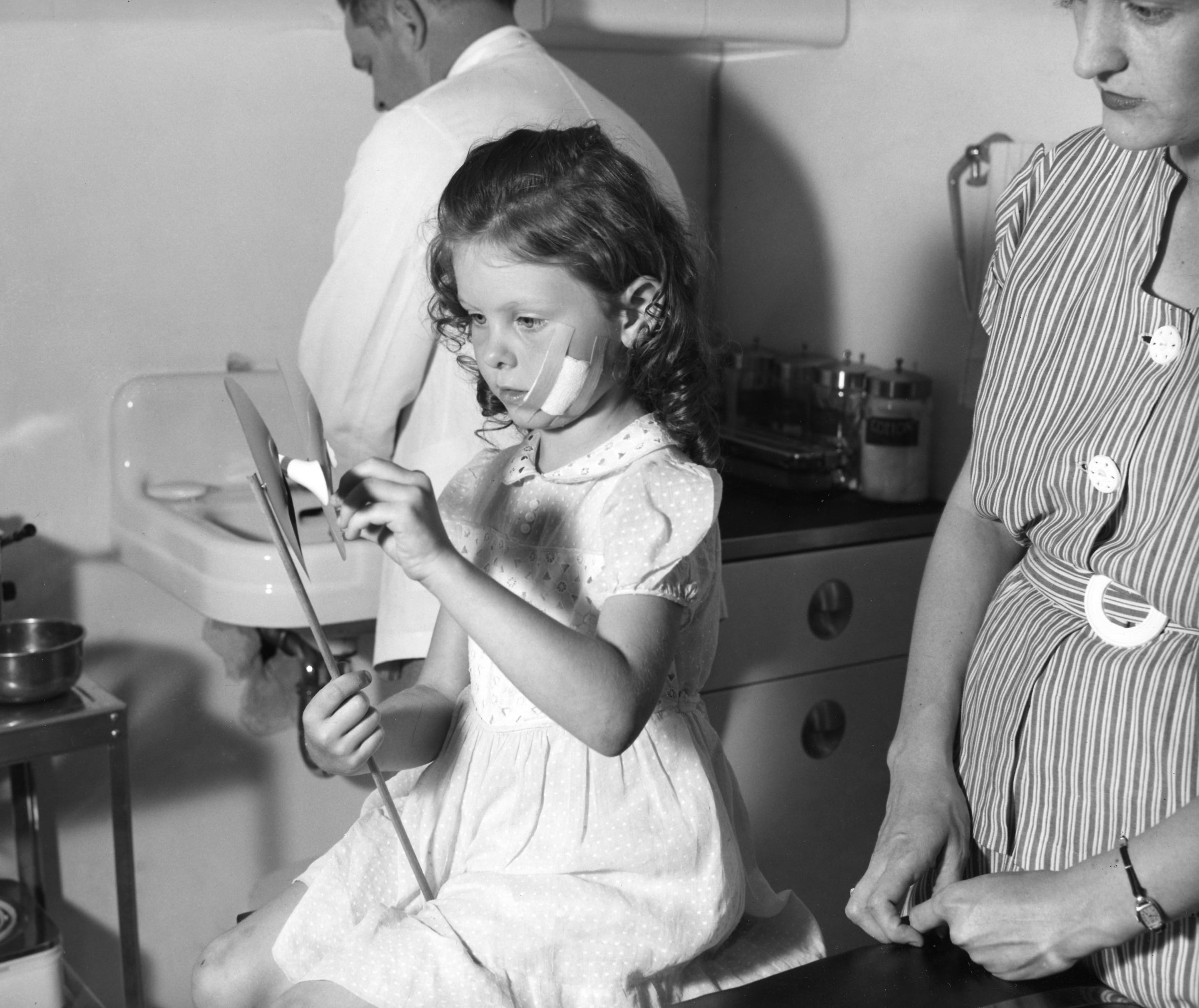
A girl about to receive PEP after being bitten by an animal thought to be rabid

Treatment after exposure can prevent the disease if given within 10 days. The rabies vaccine is 100% effective if given before symptoms of rabies appear. Every year, over 29 million people worldwide get vaccinated after potential exposure. While this works well, the cost is significant. In the US it is recommended people receive one dose of human rabies immunoglobulin (HRIG) and four doses of rabies vaccine over a 14-day period. HRIG is expensive and makes up most of the cost of post-exposure treatment, ranging as high as several thousand dollars. In the UK, one dose of HRIG costs the National Health Service £1,000, although this is not flagged as a "high-cost medication". A full course of vaccine costs £120–180. As much as possible of HRIG should be injected around the bites, with the remainder being given by deep intramuscular injection at a site distant from the vaccination site.

People who have previously been vaccinated against rabies do not need to receive the immunoglobulin—only the post-exposure vaccinations on days 0 and 3. The side effects of modern cell-based vaccines are similar to the side effects of flu shots. The old nerve-tissue-based vaccination required multiple injections into the abdomen with a large needle but is inexpensive. It is being phased out and replaced by affordable World Health Organization intradermal-vaccination regimens. In children less than a year old, the lateral thigh is recommended.

Thoroughly washing the wound as soon as possible with soap and water for approximately five minutes is effective in reducing the number of viral particles. Povidone-iodine or alcohol is then recommended to reduce the virus further.

Awakening to find a bat in the room has previously been an indication for post-exposure prophylaxis (PEP). However, if there has been no direct contact, the risk is so low, PEP is not needed. Exceptions include young children or those unable to give a reliable history, as determining if contact has occurred can be difficult, and PEP may be given. As dessication is highly effective at deactivating the rabies virus, contact with a dried-up bat carcass has virtually no risk of contracting the disease.

Although once standard, the rabies vaccine in many countries is no longer given as a series of painful injections into the abdomen. Rather, it is given as a series of intramuscular injections into the upper arm. Fears about the pain of post-exposure prophylaxis are especially dangerous as they may prevent those who have been exposed to rabies from seeking medical attention in a timely fashion.

=== After onset ===
Once rabies develops, death almost certainly follows. Palliative care in a hospital setting is recommended with administration of large doses of pain medication, and sedatives in preference to physical restraint. Ice fragments can be given by mouth for thirst, but there is no good evidence intravenous hydration is of benefit in terms of comfort or length of life in palliative care patients.

A treatment known as the Milwaukee protocol, which involves putting people with rabies symptoms into a chemically induced coma and using antiviral medications in an attempt to protect their brain until their body has had time to produce rabies antibodies, has been occasionally used. It was initially attempted in 2004 on Jeanna Giese, a teenage girl from Wisconsin, who subsequently became the first human known to have survived rabies without receiving post-exposure prophylaxis before symptom onset. Giese did require extensive rehabilitation afterward, and her balance and neural function remained impaired. The protocol has been enacted on many rabies victims since, but has been adjudged a failure; some survivors of the acute initial phase later died of rabies. Concerns have also been raised about its monetary costs and its ethics, with a report in 2025 asserting that of the few patients who survived rabies under the Milwaukee Protocol, some may never have actually had rabies progression to the point of developing antibodies, and should thus not be counted as rabies patients. If true, this finding compromises the validity of some reported success cases.

Antiviral therapy to combat the effects of rabies has also been researched; favipiravir, for example, has shown potential at inhibiting the development of encephalitis. It has been suggested that such therapy in combination with immunotherapy and neuroprotective measures could be beneficial.

== Prognosis ==
Vaccination after exposure, PEP, is highly successful in preventing rabies. In unvaccinated humans, rabies is almost certainly fatal after neurological symptoms have developed.

== Epidemiology ==
Reported deaths from rabies

Map of rabies-free countries and territories, though may have related viruses

Number of deaths from rabies by world region

In 2010, an estimated 26,000 people died from rabies, down from 54,000 in 1990. The majority of the deaths occurred in Asia and Africa. As of 2015, India (approximately 20,847), followed by China (approximately 6,000) and the Democratic Republic of the Congo (5,600), had the most cases. A 2015 collaboration between the World Health Organization, World Organization of Animal Health (OIE), Food and Agriculture Organization of the United Nation (FAO), and Global Alliance for Rabies Control has a goal of eliminating deaths from rabies by 2030.

=== India ===
India has the highest rate of human rabies in the world, primarily because of stray dogs, whose number has greatly increased since a 2001 law forbade the killing of dogs. Effective control and treatment of rabies in India is hindered by a form of mass hysteria known as puppy pregnancy syndrome (PPS). Dog bite victims with PPS, male as well as female, become convinced that puppies are growing inside them and often seek help from faith healers rather than medical services. An estimated 20,000 people die every year from rabies in India, more than a third of the global total.

=== Africa ===
Africa accounts for a large proportion of global rabies deaths. The World Health Organization estimates that approximately 21,476 people die each year in Africa from rabies transmitted by dogs, although the actual number is unknown because many cases go unreported or undiagnosed. Dogs are responsible for up to 99% of rabies transmissions to humans. Children and people living in poor rural areas are at greater risk, partly because they have more limited access to post-exposure prophylaxis. Affected countries include Nigeria, the Democratic Republic of the Congo, Ethiopia, Mozambique, Madagascar, and Tanzania. Vaccinating dogs and increasing access to post-exposure treatment can prevent many deaths. Both are part of a global effort to eliminate human deaths from dog-transmitted rabies by 2030.

=== Australia ===
Australia has an official rabies-free status, although Australian bat lyssavirus (ABLV), discovered in 1996, is a rabies-causing virus related to the rabies virus prevalent in Australian native bat populations.

=== United States ===
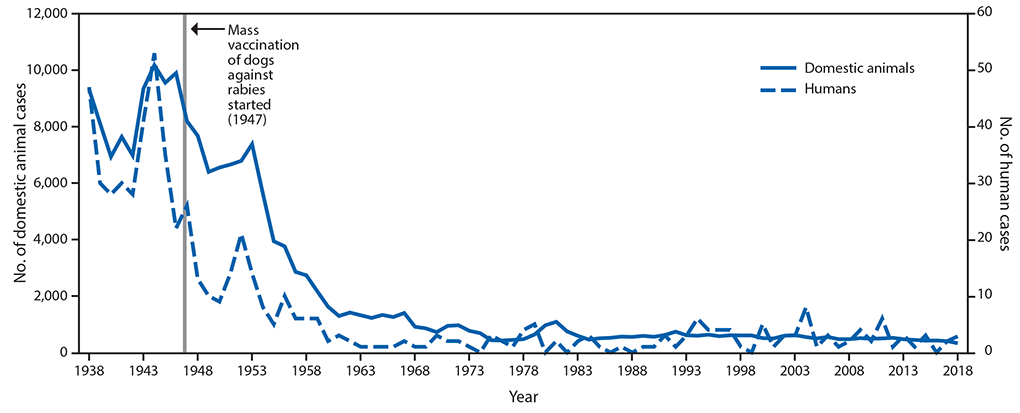
Rabies cases in humans and domestic animals – United States, 1938–2018

Canine-specific rabies has been eradicated in the United States, but rabies is common among wild animals, and an average of 100 dogs become infected from other wildlife each year.

High public awareness of the virus, efforts at vaccination of domestic animals and curtailment of feral populations, and availability of postexposure prophylaxis have made rabies very rare in humans in the United States. From 1960 to 2018, a total of 125 such cases were reported in the United States; of them, 36 (28%) were attributed to dog bites suffered during international travel. Among the 89 infections acquired in the United States, 62 (70%) were attributed to bats.

Rabies in a feral cat (part of a colony of 20 cats) was reported from Maryland in 2025.

=== Canada ===
Human rabies is very rare in Canada. Of the human cases contracted domestically in Canada since 2000, all have been acquired from bats (the cases occurred in 2000 in Quebec, in 2003 and 2019 in British Columbia, in 2007 in Alberta and in 2024 in Ontario).

=== Europe ===
Either no or very few cases of rabies are reported each year in Europe; cases are contracted both during travel and in Europe.

In Switzerland the disease was virtually eliminated after scientists placed chicken heads laced with live attenuated vaccine in the Swiss Alps. Foxes, proven to be the main source of rabies in the country, ate the chicken heads and became immunized.

Italy, after being declared rabies-free from 1997 to 2008, witnessed a temporary reemergence of the disease in wild animals in the Triveneto regions (Trentino-Alto Adige/Südtirol, Veneto and Friuli-Venezia Giulia) due to the spreading of an epidemic in the Balkans that also affected Austria. An extensive wild animal vaccination campaign eliminated the virus from Italy again, and it regained the rabies-free country status in 2013, the last reported case of rabies being reported in a red fox in early 2011.

The United Kingdom has been free of rabies since the early 20th century except for a rabies-like virus (EBLV-2) in a few Daubenton's bats. There has been one fatal case of EBLV-2 transmission to a human. As of 2026 there had been six deaths from rabies transmitted abroad by dogs and cats since 2000. The last infection in the UK occurred in 1922, and the last death from indigenous rabies was in 1902.

Sweden and mainland Norway have been free of rabies since 1886. Bat rabies antibodies (but not the virus) have been found in bats. On Svalbard, animals can cross the arctic ice from Greenland or Russia.

In Europe there have been five documented human deaths caused by lyssaviruses carried by bats: in Ukraine (1977, species not characterised), Russia (1985, EBLV‐1), Finland (1985, EBLV‐2), the United Kingdom (2002, EBLV‐2) and France (2019, EBLV‐1).

=== Mexico ===
Mexico was certified by the World Health Organization as being free of dog-transmitted rabies in 2019 because no case of dog-human transmission had been recorded in two years. However, rabies continues to be present in wildlife, which occasionally spills to domestic animals, as has been the case in 2025, when a man in the state of Jalisco died after contracting rabies from a cow.

=== Asia ===
Despite rabies being preventable and the many successes over the years from North America, South Korea and Western Europe, rabies remains endemic in many southern and eastern Asian countries including Cambodia, Bangladesh, Bhutan, North Korea, India, Indonesia, Myanmar, Nepal, Sri Lanka, and Thailand. Half the global rabies deaths occur in southeast Asia, approximately 26,000 per year.

Much of what prevents Asia from implementing the same measures as other countries is cost. Treating wild canines is the primary means of preventing rabies; however, it costs 10 times more than treating individuals as they come with bites, and research also increases cost. As a result, India and other surrounding countries are unable to apply many preventative measures because of financial limitations.

==== Cambodia ====
Cambodia has approximately 800 cases of human rabies per year, making it one of the top countries in human rabies incidences. Much of this falls on their lack of animal care; Cambodia has hundreds of thousands of animals infected with rabies, another global high, yet little surveillance of said animals and few laws requiring pets and other household animals to be vaccinated. In recent years Cambodia has improved significantly in their human rabies medical practices, with clinics all over the countries being made with treatments and vaccination on hand as well as rabies-related education in school classes. However, it is still lacking in terms of animal surveillance and treatment which leads to bleeding into surrounding countries.

==== Philippines ====
The Philippines is among the countries in Asia which reports the highest incidence of human rabies. Dog-mediated rabies is endemic in the country. Around 200–420 cases are reported annually.

==== Thailand ====
In 2013 human rabies was nearly eradicated in the state of Thailand after new measures were put into place requiring the vaccination of all domestic dogs as well as programs seeking to vaccinate wild dogs and large animals. However, neighboring countries unable to afford rabies control measures – Cambodia, Laos, and Myanmar – allowed infected animals to continue to pass the border and infect the Thai population, leading to ~100 cases a year. These areas around the border are called Rabies Red areas and are where Thailand continuously struggles with eradication and will do so until the surrounding countries eliminate the virus.

Thailand has the resources and medicine necessary to tackle rabies such as implementing regulations that require all children to receive a rabies vaccination before attending schools and having clinics available for those bit or scratched by a possible rabid animal. However, individual choice is still a factor, and 10 people per year die out of refusal to seek treatment.

== History ==
Rabies has been known since around 2000 BC. The first written record of rabies is in the Mesopotamian Codex of Eshnunna (c. 1930 BC), which dictates that the owner of a dog showing symptoms of rabies should take preventive measures against bites. If another person were bitten by a rabid dog and later died, the owner was heavily fined.

It was historically referred to as hydrophobia ("fear of water") because most people affected panic when offered liquids to drink as a result of uncontrollable, painful spasms in their throat muscles when they swallow.

In ancient Greece, rabies was believed to be caused by Lyssa, the spirit of mad rage.

Ineffective folk remedies abounded in the medical literature of the ancient world. The physician Scribonius Largus prescribed a poultice of cloth and hyena skin; Antaeus recommended a preparation made from the skull of a hanged man. In some instances the attachment of the tongue (the lingual frenulum) was excised, as this was where rabies was thought to originate.

Rabies appears to have originated in the Old World, the first epizootic in the New World occurring in Boston in 1768.

Rabies was considered a scourge for its prevalence in the 19th century. In France and Belgium, where Saint Hubert was venerated, the "St Hubert's Key" was heated and applied to cauterize the wound. By an application of magical thinking, dogs were branded with the key in hopes of protecting them from rabies.

Louis Pasteur's successful 1885 nerve tissue vaccine was progressively improved to reduce often severe side-effects. Still, in modern times, the fear of rabies has not diminished, and the disease and its symptoms, particularly agitation, have served as an inspiration for several works of zombie or similarly themed fiction, often portraying rabies as having mutated into a stronger virus which fills humans with murderous rage or incurable illness, bringing about a devastating, widespread pandemic.

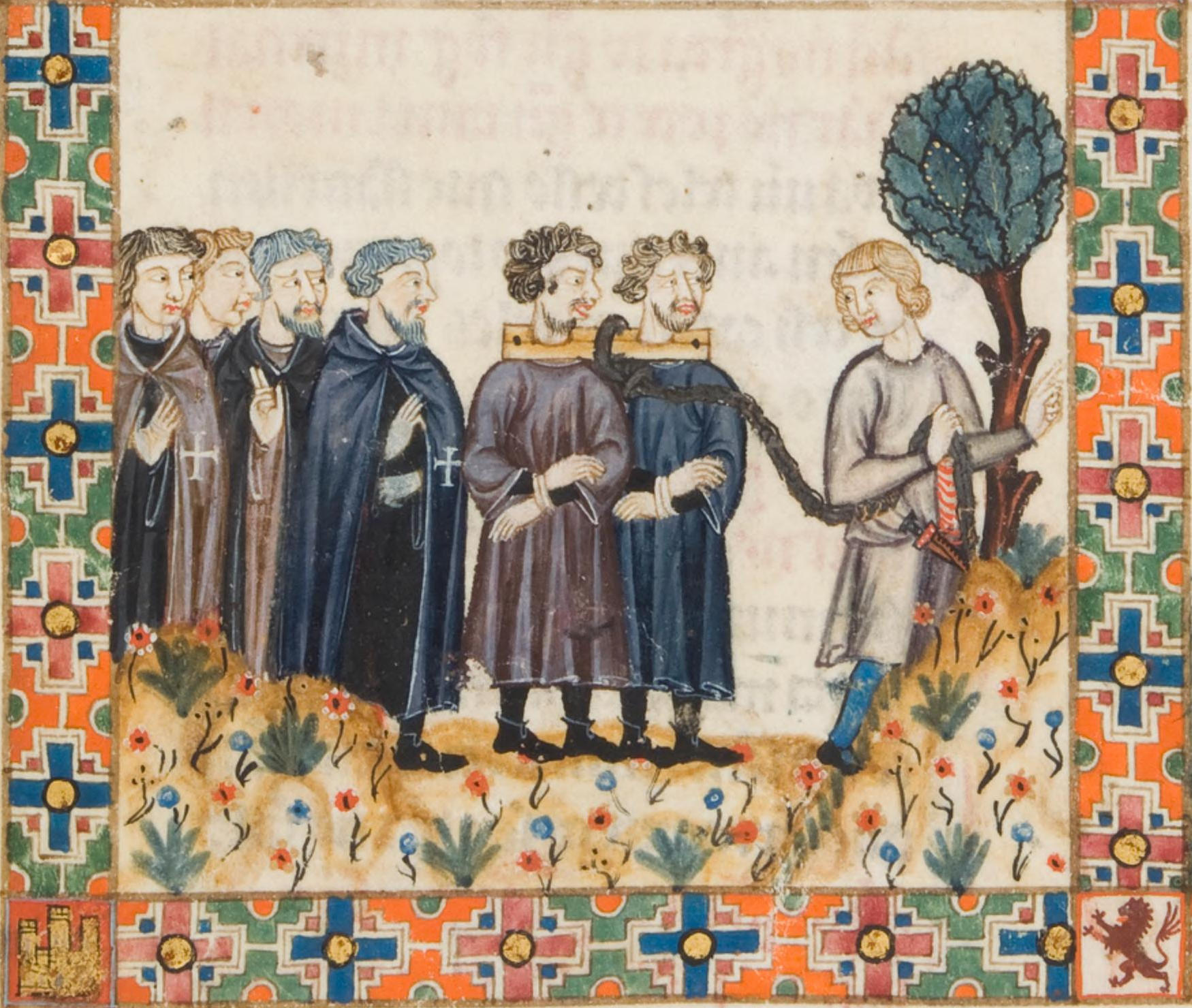
Miniature of the Cantiga #275 depicting two monks hospitaller with rabies being carried before St. Mary of Terena

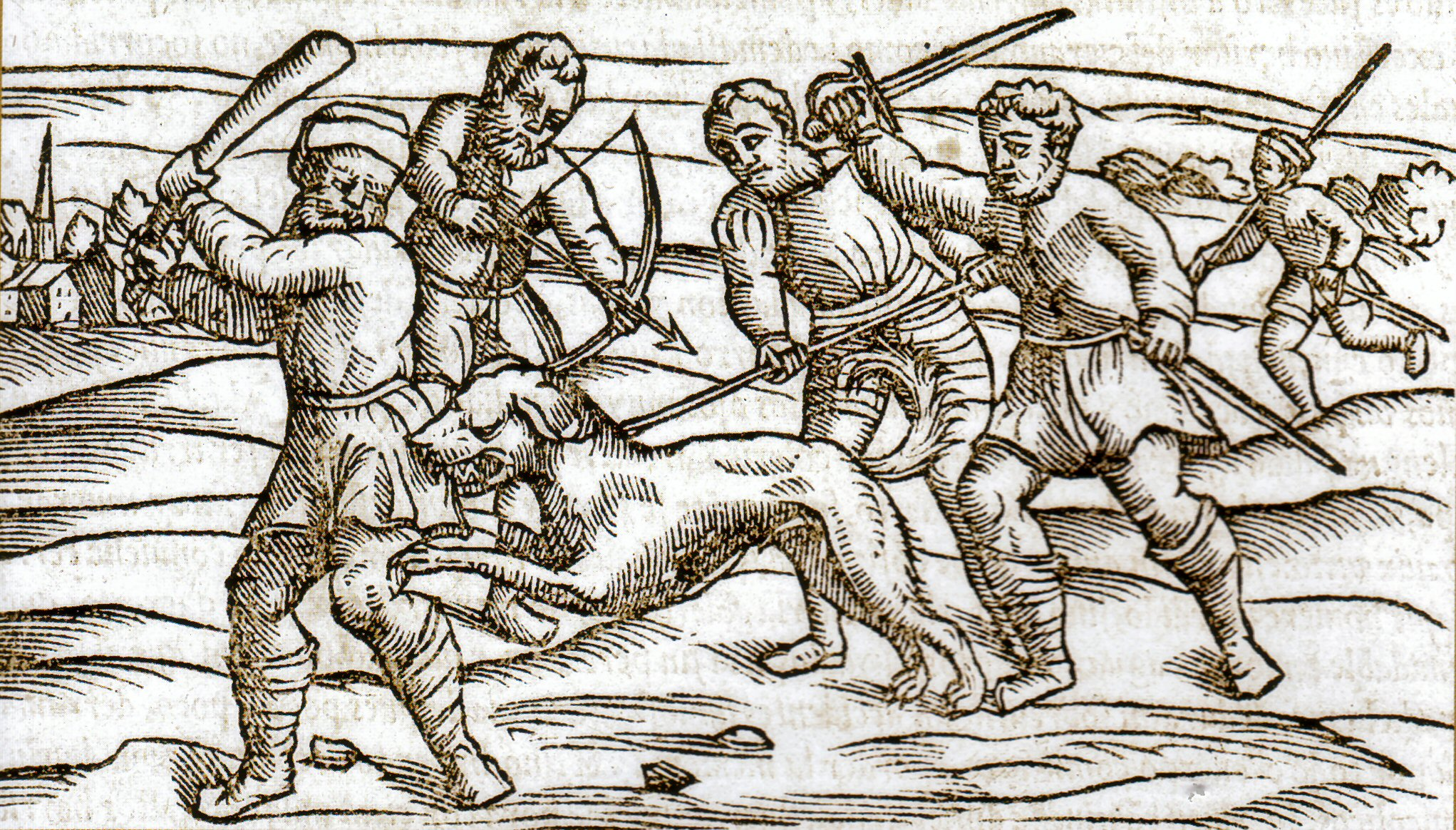
A woodcut from the Middle Ages showing a rabid dog

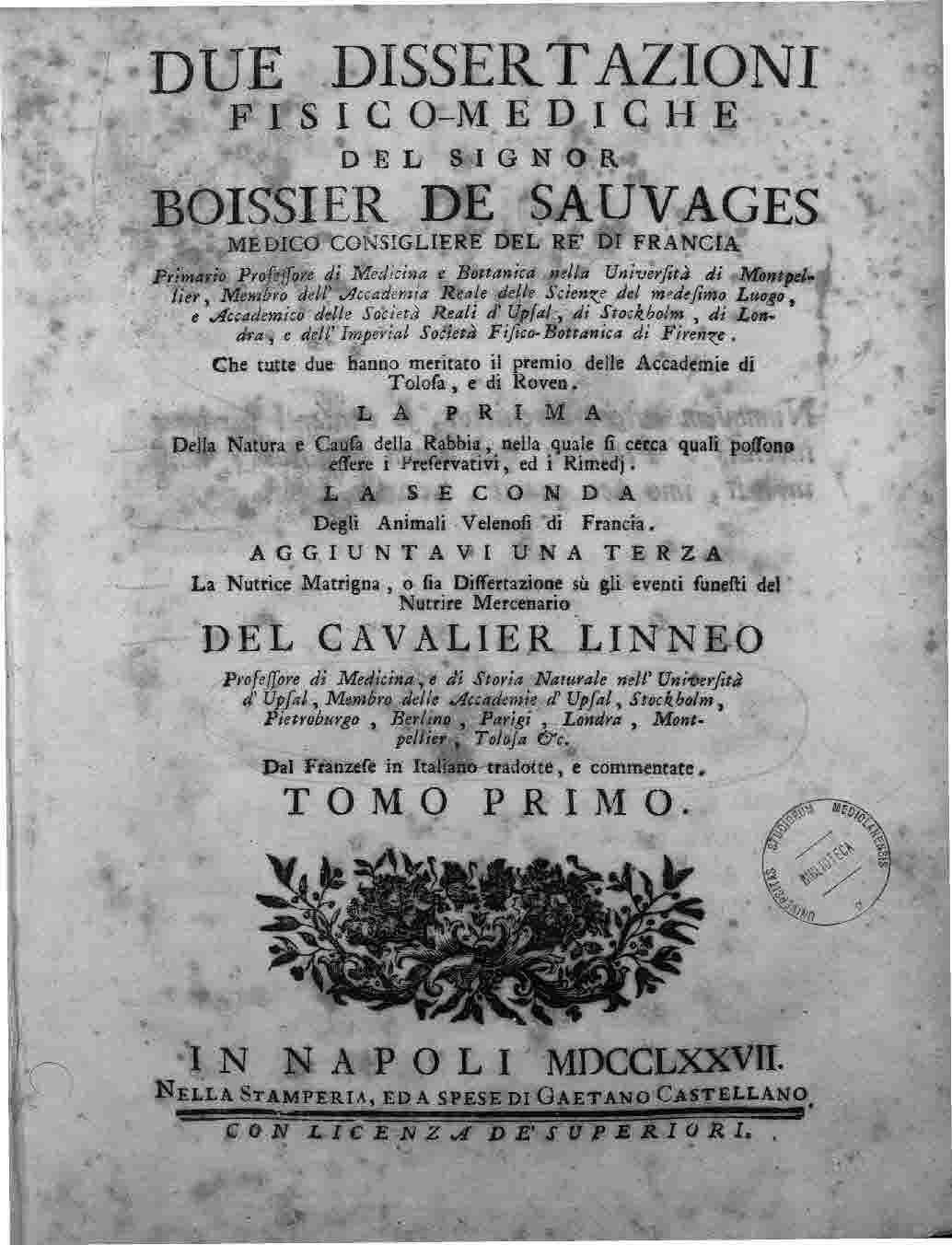
François Boissier de Sauvages de Lacroix, Della natura e causa della rabbia (Dissertation sur la nature et la cause de la Rage), 1777

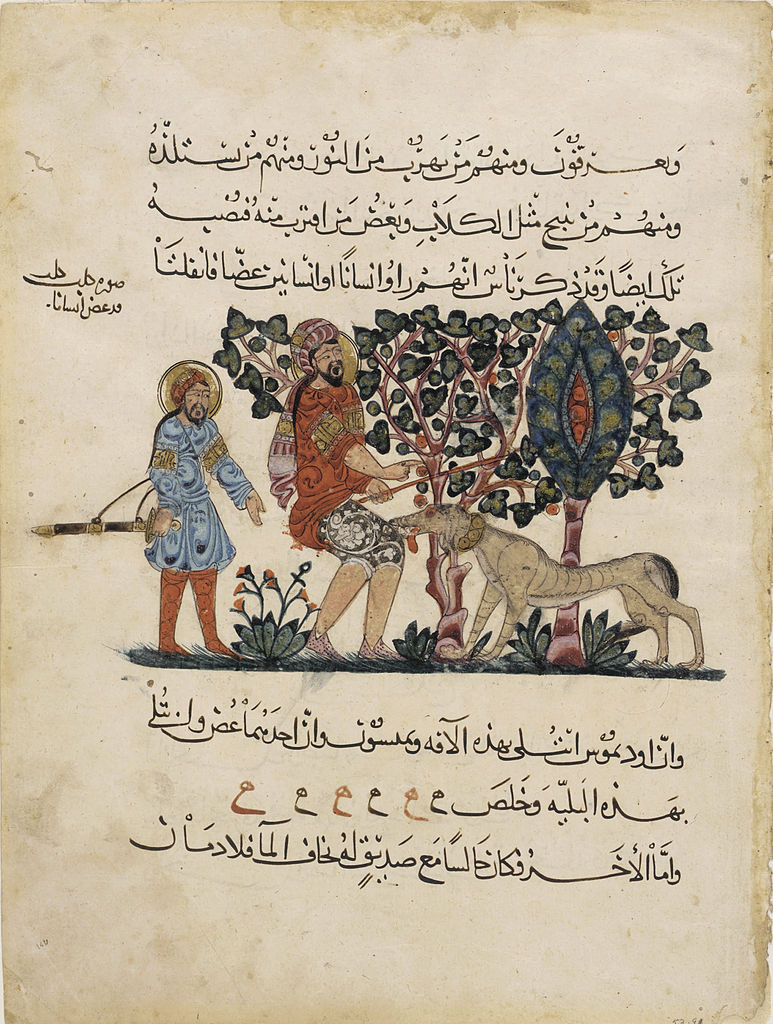
An Arabic folio from the medieval times depicting a rabid dog biting a man, c. 1224

=== Terminology ===
The name rabies is derived from the Latin rabies, meaning 'madness'. The Greek word λῠ́σσᾰ (lyssa, 'madness'), derived either from a feminine form of λῠ́κος (lykos, 'wolf') or from the Proto-Indo-European root *lewk- ('light'), is used in the genus name of the rabies virus, Lyssavirus.

== Other animals ==
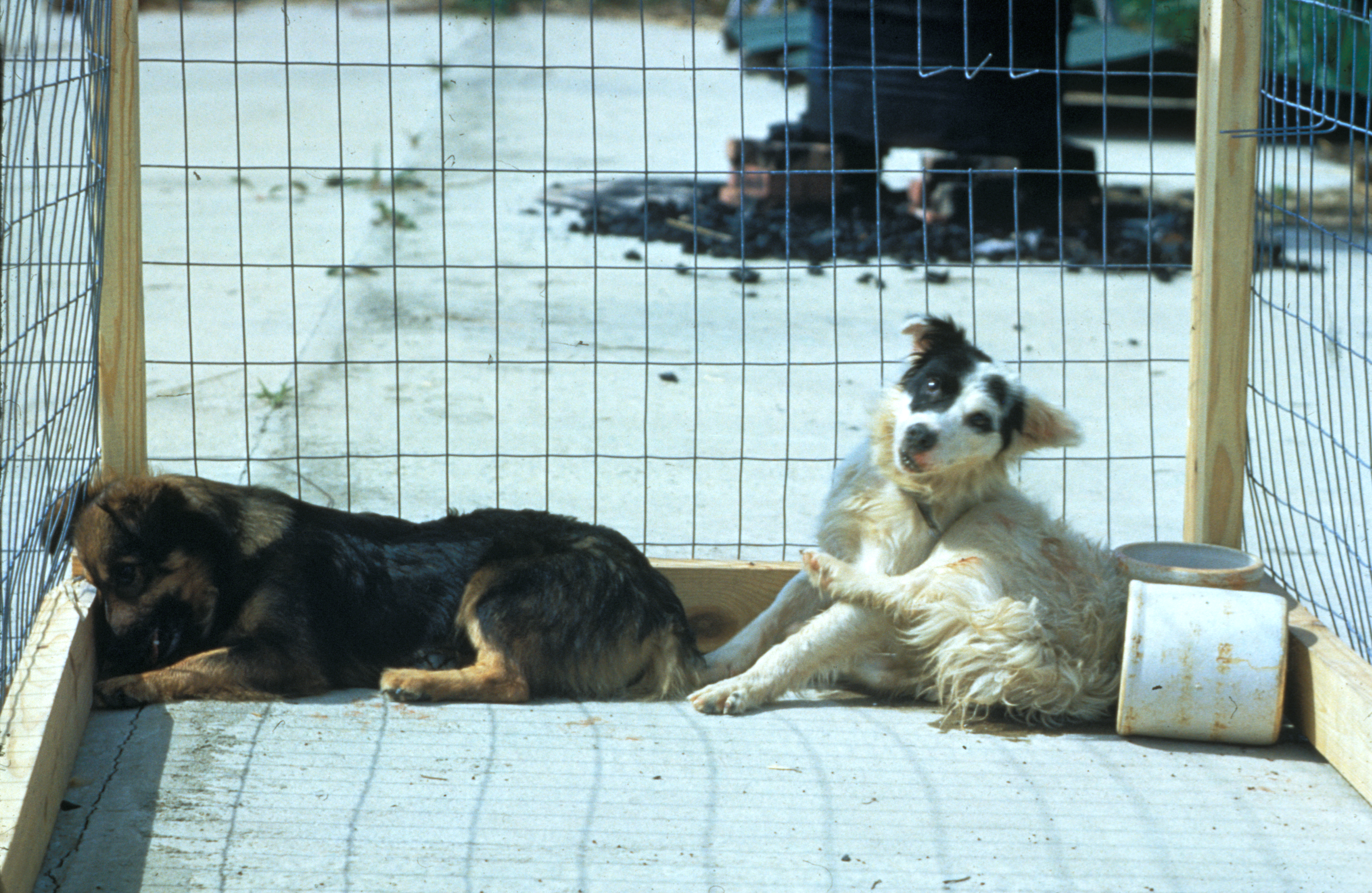
Two dogs with the paralytic, or dumb, form of rabies

Rabies is infectious to mammals; three stages of central nervous system infection are recognized. The clinical course is often shorter in animals than in humans but results in similar symptoms and almost always death. The first stage is a one- to three-day period characterized by behavioral changes, known as the prodromal stage. The second is the excitative stage, which lasts three to four days. This stage is often known as furious rabies for the tendency of the affected animal to be hyperreactive to external stimuli and bite or attack anything near, potentially spreading the disease. In some cases, animals bypass this stage to enter the third, paralytic stage, which arises from damage to motor neurons. Incoordination, owing to rear limb paralysis, and drooling and difficulty swallowing, owing to paralysis of facial and throat muscles, develop. Death is usually caused by respiratory arrest.

== Research ==
Research conducted in 2010 among a population of people in Peru with a self-reported history of exposures to vampire bats (commonly infected with rabies) found that seven out of 73 subjects whose blood serum was tested had rabies virus-neutralizing antibodies, though only one reported prior rabies vaccination. These findings suggest previously undocumented cases of infection and viral replication followed by abortive infection, indicating that some people exposed to the virus can thereby develop natural antibodies without treatment.

== See also ==
- Dog meat
- Eradication of infectious diseases
- Madstone (folklore)
- Rabies in Haiti
- Rabies in popular culture
