= Scottish painted pebbles =

Early Medieval artifact found in Scotland

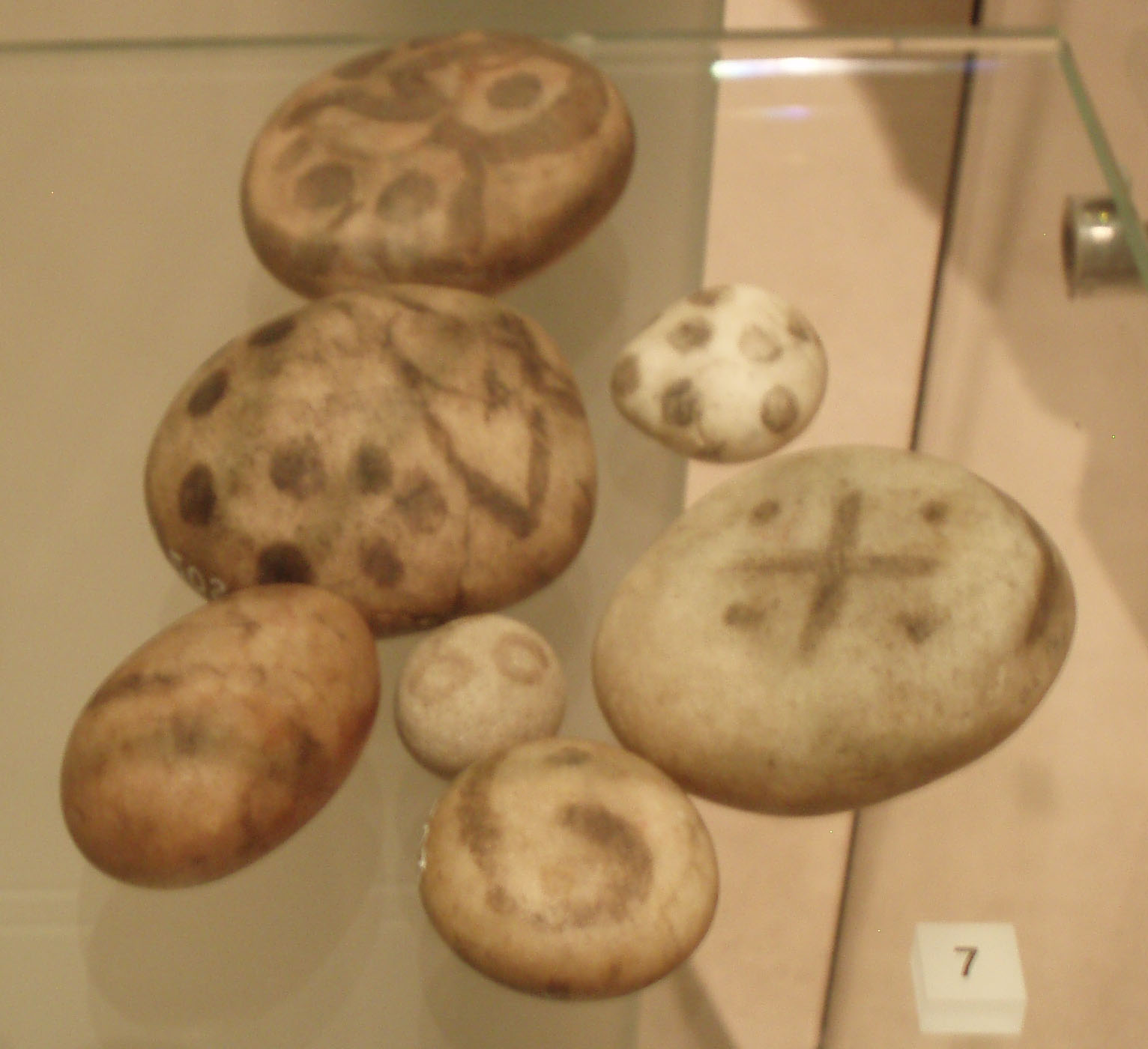
Pictish painted pebbles

Painted pebbles are a class of Early Medieval artifact found in northern Scotland dating from the first millennium CE.

== Appearance ==
They are small rounded beach pebbles made of quartzite, which have been painted with simple designs in a dye which is now dark brown in colour. The size varies from 18 by 22 millimetres (0.71 by 0.87 in) to 65 by 51 millimetres (2.6 by 2.0 in). It has not proven possible to analyse the dye itself from the stains that remain.

The motifs are carefully executed and the most common are dots and wavy lines. Other motifs are small circles, pentacles, crescents and triangles, showing strong relationships with the Pictish symbol stone motifs.

Experimental archaeology suggests that the designs were likely to have been painted with peat tar.

== Distribution ==
To date, 55 painted pebbles have been found. 11 of these were found in Caithness, 5 in Orkney and 27 in Shetland. Most have come from broch sites which have been shown to have had an extensive post-broch occupation. An ogham-inscribed spindle-whorl was associated with one find at Buckquoy in Orkney (see Buckquoy spindle whorl). Several have been associated with wheelhouses or their outbuildings. An example was found at a Pictish site at Buckquoy in Orkney as reported in 1976. It had the "small ring" type decoration.

== Manufacture ==
No statements can be made about the paints used, as their brown residues have so far not been sufficient for an investigation. Good experimental results were achieved in the early 2010s using a pitch-like material that is produced as a residue from the burning of peat. This can be found widely on the surface of the earth in the north of the British Isles, and its use as a heating material on in Shetland has already been proven for the early Iron Age. The material was applied with a straw, and halved quills and the stems of angelica roots were used for the round shapes.

== Cultural significance ==
Scottish painted pebbles have been dated to the period 200 AD to the eighth century AD, the Pictish period. They may have been sling-stones that were thought to be of magical nature by the Picts; however, local traditions suggest that they were "charm-stones", often known as "cold-stones". Such stones were used within living memory to cure sickness in animals and humans.

In the Life of St. Columba it is recorded that he visited King Bridei in Pictland in around the year 565 AD and, taking a white stone pebble from the River Ness, he blessed it and any water it came into contact with would cure sick people. It floated in water and cured the king from a terminal illness. It remained as one of the great treasures of the king and cured many others.

== See also ==
- Amulets
- Apotrope
- Azilian pebbles
- Touch pieces

== Bibliography ==
- Arthur, Robbie; Murray, Jenny; Ritchie, Anna (2014), "Painting the stones black: solving the mystery of painted quartz pebbles" (PDF), Archaeology Reports Online, vol. 12, pp. 1–18
- Ritchie, Anna (1972), "Painted pebbles in early Scotland" (PDF), Proceedings of the Society of Antiquaries of Scotland, 104: 297–301, doi:10.9750/PSAS.104.297.301, archived from the original (PDF) on 3 May 2013
- Ritchie, Anna (1977), "Excavation of Pictish and Viking-age farmsteads at Buckquoy, Orkney" (PDF), Proceedings of the Society of Antiquaries of Scotland, 108: 174–227, doi:10.9750/PSAS.108.174.227
