= Antaeus (short story) =

1961 short story by Borden Deal

"Antaeus" is a 1961 short story by Borden Deal, originally published in Southwest Review. It is named after the mythological figure Antaeus, a giant who was unconquerable as long as he touched the ground.

This story has appeared in many American and British school textbooks. It is an archetypal tale of rural ways clashing with urban lifestyles.

The story is about a boy named T.J. from Marion County, Alabama who moves to a city in the North. He organizes an effort by a gang of kids to grow a garden at the gang’s hideout, on top of a factory building.

After a lot of painstaking work, the kids are finally successful in cultivating grass, but are discovered on the rooftop by three men, including the building’s owner. The owner orders the garden to be shoveled off by one of his employees by the next day. After they leave, T.J. and the rest of the kids destroy the garden themselves, throwing the dirt and grass off the roof.

After this sudden action T.J. leaves, and two weeks later is found by the Nashville police, walking on his way home on the railroad tracks.
