= Antaeus (physician) =

Ancient Greek physician

Antaeus (Ancient Greek: Ἀνταῖος) or Anthaeus (Ἀνθαῖος) was a physician of ancient Greece, whose outlandish remedy for rabies is mentioned by Pliny the Elder, and consisted of deriving a potion from the skull of a hanged man. One of his prescriptions is preserved by Galen. Nothing is known of the events of his life, but since Pliny mentions him, he must have lived some time in or before the first century CE.
