= Madstone (folklore) =

Folkloric rabies cure

In the folklore of the early United States, a madstone was a special medicinal substance that, when pressed into an animal bite, was believed to prevent rabies by drawing the "poison" out. The Encyclopedia Americana described it as "a vegetable substance or stone". Researchers publishing in 1958 reported "130 cases of healing attributed to the madstone" and "three authenticated stones in the United States today."

Another account relates an event "in or around 1939" that the madstone was used in Oklahoma. It claimed that the madstone was believed by the locals to have been an organ from an albino deer. This account says that the organ they were using was "from a regular deer, not albino." This account purported that the madstone had to be kept and stored in fresh milk, and that the milk had to be changed daily. It describes an event where an individual had been bitten in the leg by a rattlesnake. According to the account, "One by one, they would cut an X into his leg and apply the madstone to the cut. When the madstone was full, it would fall off. They would then rinse it out in the milk, cut an X and apply it again." In this account, the individual lived.

Researchers have speculated that there might be some connection between the belief in the madstone and fictitious Talisman written of in a novel by that name by Sir Walter Scott which cures a dog bite victim and is brought back from The Holy Land by crusaders, "...but though many cures were wrought by means of it in Europe, none equalled in success and celebrity those which the Soldan achieved. It is still in existence, having been bequeathed by the Earl of Huntingdon to a brave knight of Scotland, Sir Simon of the Lee, in whose ancient and highly honoured family it is still preserved; and although charmed stones have been dismissed from the modern Pharmacopoeia, its virtues are still applied to for stopping blood, and in cases of canine madness."
