= Crepundia =

Amulet-chains, in Classical antiquity.

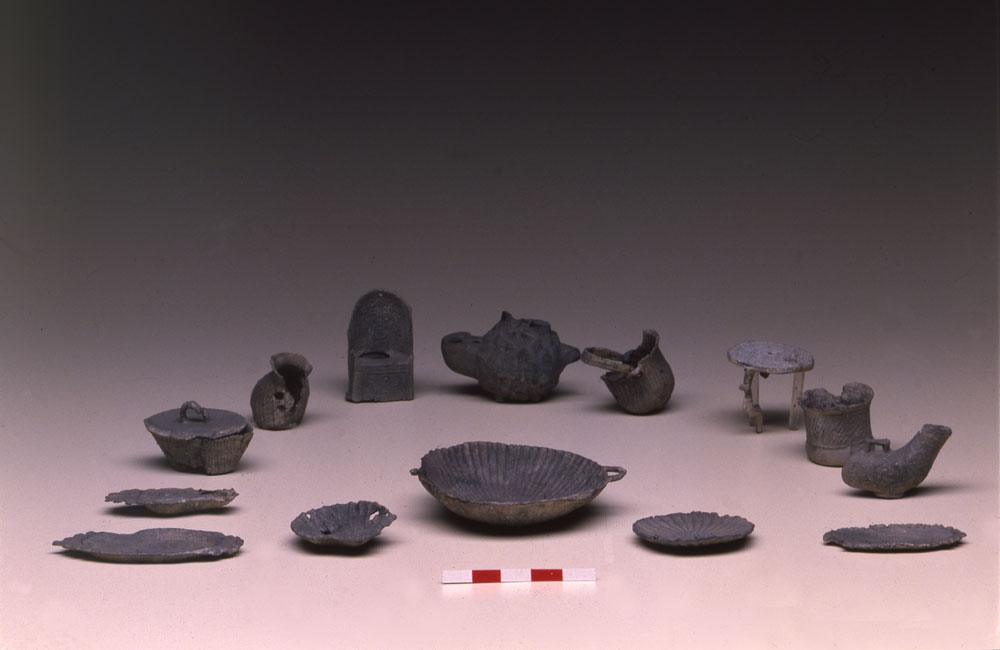
Iulia Graphis' lead toys, 2nd century, Reggio Emilia City Museums

Crepundia are groups of amulets, often strung onto chains in Classical antiquity. They are similar to charm bracelets and are archaeologically associated with children.

== Etymology ==
The singular form of the word, crepundium, derives from the Latin word crepare "to rattle or make a noise". The word crepundia may be confused with crepitacula, which refers to a form of rattle. Ancient examples may be made from ceramic, wood, or bronze.

== History and features ==
Similar amulet chains were used in the ancient world from at least the 4th Century BC. Crepundia are referred to in Act 4 of Rudens (dated to c.211 BC) in which the character Palaestra describes the contents of a trinket box owned since childhood: a miniature gold sword inscribed with her father's name; a miniature gold axe inscribed with her mother's name; a silver knife; a little pig; a gold bulla. Crepundia are variable objects, but Martin-Kilcher defined five main sorts of objects that feature in them: noise-producing objects; meaningful shapes; those with ‘exterior qualities’; remarkable objects and curiosities; materials valued for their special properties.

The noise-making components of crepundia may have been used to calm distressed infants or children, or used as a toy.

=== Examples ===
- Two infant burials from Aquincum (dated to the 1st-2nd centuries AD) between them contained small amber, bone, and glass pendants depicting: a money bag, a dolphin, a phallus, a comb, a cicada, an axe, and a male deity.
- A child's grave from the Ponte Galeria in Rome contained a string of amber and bone beads, a pierced tooth, a faience figure of Bes and an amber phallus.
- A child burial from Chichester included an iron bell, a red-slipped carinated bowl with a graffito of a cross on the base, and a small pebble, together described as crepundia by the excavators.

== See also ==
- Lunula (amulet)
- Magic in the Greco-Roman world
