= Amulet =

Object believed to offer protection or grace on the wearer

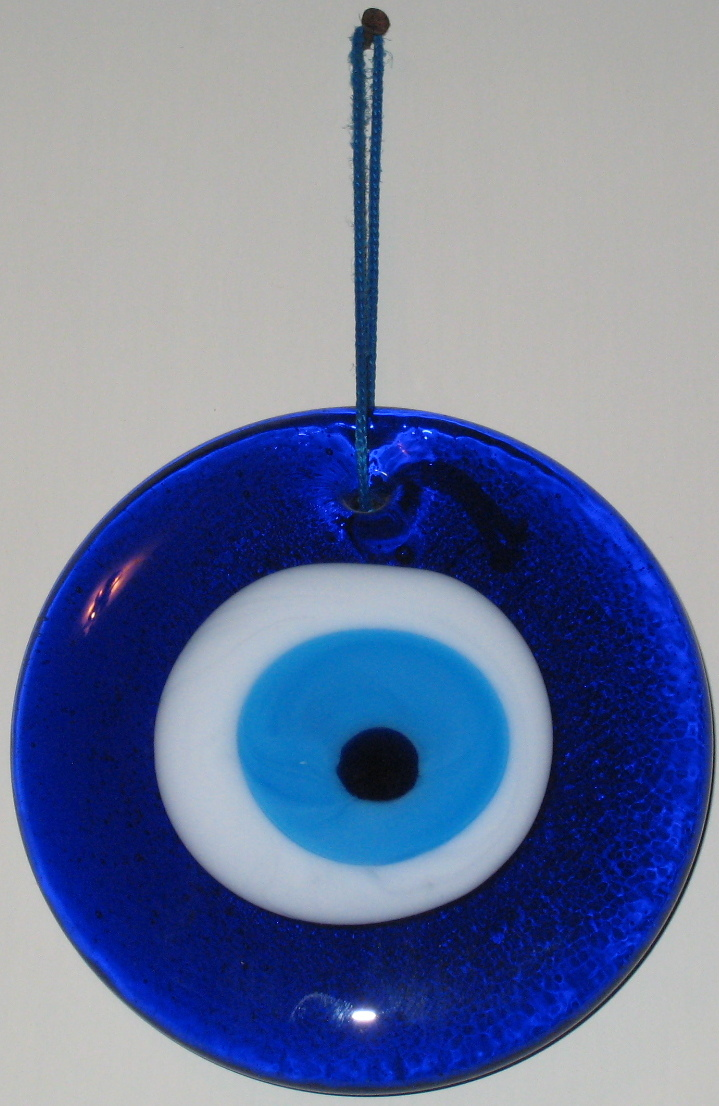
A nazar, an amulet to ward off the evil eye

An amulet is a spiritual object believed to confer protection or grace upon its possessor. The word amulet comes from the Latin word amuletum, which Pliny's Natural History describes as "an object that protects a person from trouble". Anything can function as an amulet; items commonly so used include statues, coins, drawings, plant parts, animal parts, and written words. The word phylactery is sometimes used as a general synonym likewise referring to any unspecified amulet, but also has a specific definition within Judaism. Certain amulets may also qualify more specifically as a devotional article, good luck charm, or even both in rare circumstances, but those categories represent only subsets of amulets (the proper, inclusive term).

Amulets are sometimes subdivided into two classes: those purported to carry extraordinary properties or impart fortune (these are typically part of folk religion including shades of paganism) and those that are not believed to have any inherent properties of their own without a qualifying faith or lifestyle (these are most common within Catholicism and usually involve a formal blessing by a clergyman). Lines in this area blur almost from the immediate outset: many from the latter group are not officially described as providing any preternatural benefit to a bearer who does not have an appropriate disposition or sacred objects of formalised mainstream religion as in Christianity, but the very text inscribed on others (such as the Brown Scapular) appear in conflict with this sanctioned definition (as do early practices involving the Green Scapular, which was believed to gain favor for someone of any faith if it was planted in their home by a member of the Catholic faithful, even secretly).

Talismans and amulets have interchangeable meanings. Amulets refer to any object which has the power to avert evil influences or ill luck. An amulet is an object that is generally worn for protection and made from a durable material (metal or hard-stone). Both amulets and talismans can be applied to paper examples as well. Amulets are sometimes confused with pendants, small aesthetic objects that hang from necklaces. Any given pendant may indeed be an amulet but so may any other object that purportedly protects its holder from danger.

== Ancient Egypt ==
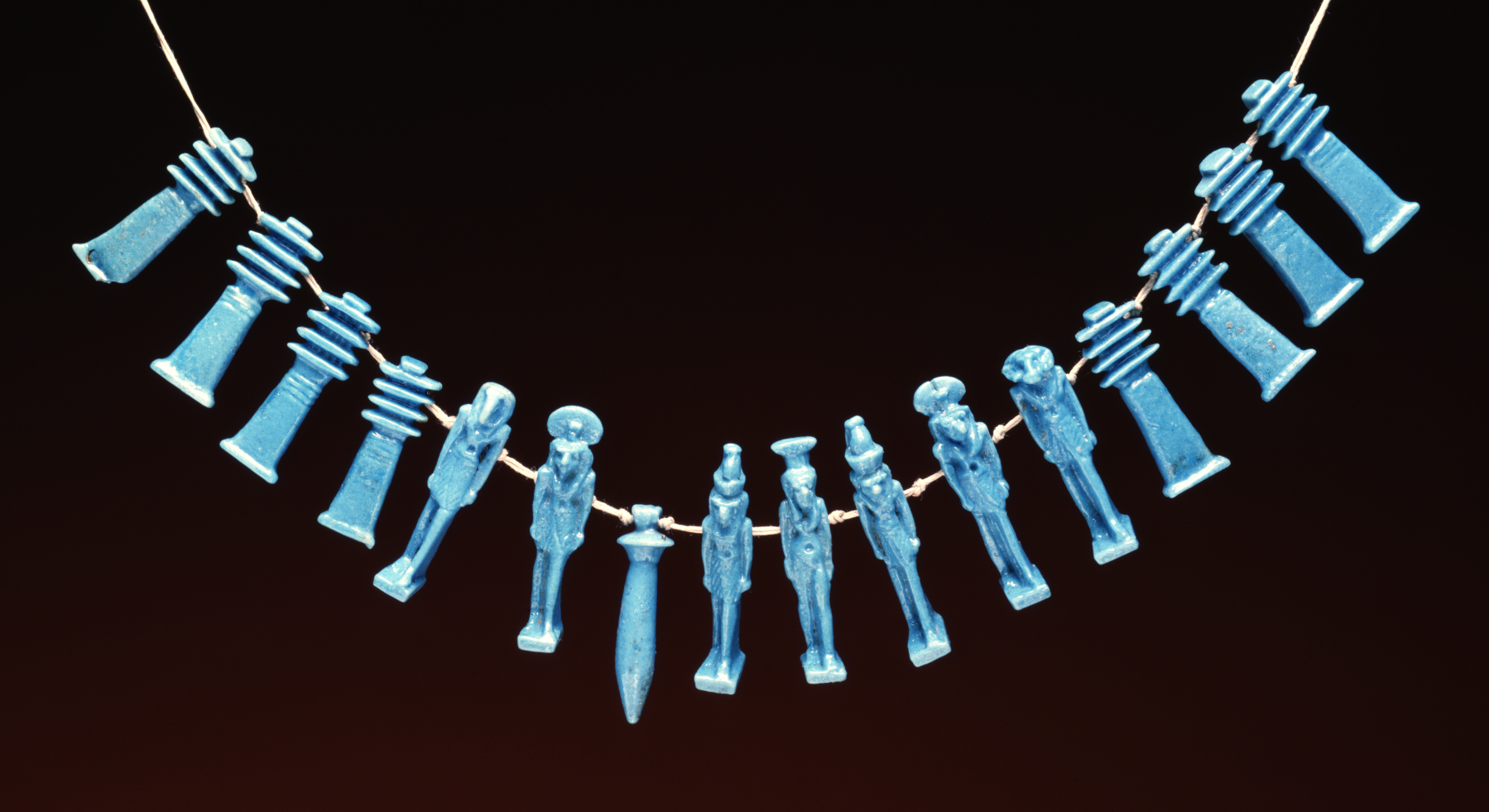
Djed, wadj, and figures of gods; amulets made of Egyptian faience.

The use of amulets (meket) was widespread among both living and dead ancient Egyptians. They were used for protection and as a means of "...reaffirming the fundamental fairness of the universe". The oldest amulets found are from the predynastic Badarian Period, and they persisted all the way through to Roman times.

Pregnant women would wear amulets depicting Taweret, the goddess of childbirth, to protect against miscarriage. The god Bes, who had the head of a lion and the body of a dwarf, was believed to be the protector of children. After giving birth, a mother would remove her Taweret amulet and put on a new amulet representing Bes.

Amulets depicted specific symbols, among the most common are the ankh and the Eye of Horus, which represented the new eye given to Horus by the god Thoth as a replacement for his old eye, which had been destroyed during a battle with Horus's uncle Seth. Amulets were often made to represent gods, animals or hieroglyphs. For example, the common amulet shape the scarab beetle is the emblem of the god Khepri.

The most common material for such amulets was a kind of ceramic known as Egyptian faience or tjehenet, but amulets were also made of stone, metal, bone, wood and gold. Phylacteries containing texts were another common form of amulet.

Like the Mesopotamians, the ancient Egyptians had no distinction between the categories magic and medicine. Indeed for them "...religion was a potent and legitimate tool for affecting magical cures". Each treatment was a complementary combination of practical medicine and magical spells. Magical spells against snakebite are the oldest magical remedies known from Egypt.

The Egyptians believed that diseases stemmed from both supernatural and natural causes. The symptoms of the disease determined which deity the doctor needed to invoke in order to cure it.

Doctors were extremely expensive, therefore, for most everyday purposes, the average Egyptian would have relied on individuals who were not professional doctors, but who possessed some form of medical training or knowledge. Among these individuals were folk healers and seers, who could set broken bones, aid mothers in giving birth, prescribe herbal remedies for common ailments, and interpret dreams. If a doctor or seer was unavailable, then everyday people would simply cast their spells on their own without assistance. It was likely commonplace for individuals to memorize spells and incantations for later use.

== Ancient Greece and Rome ==
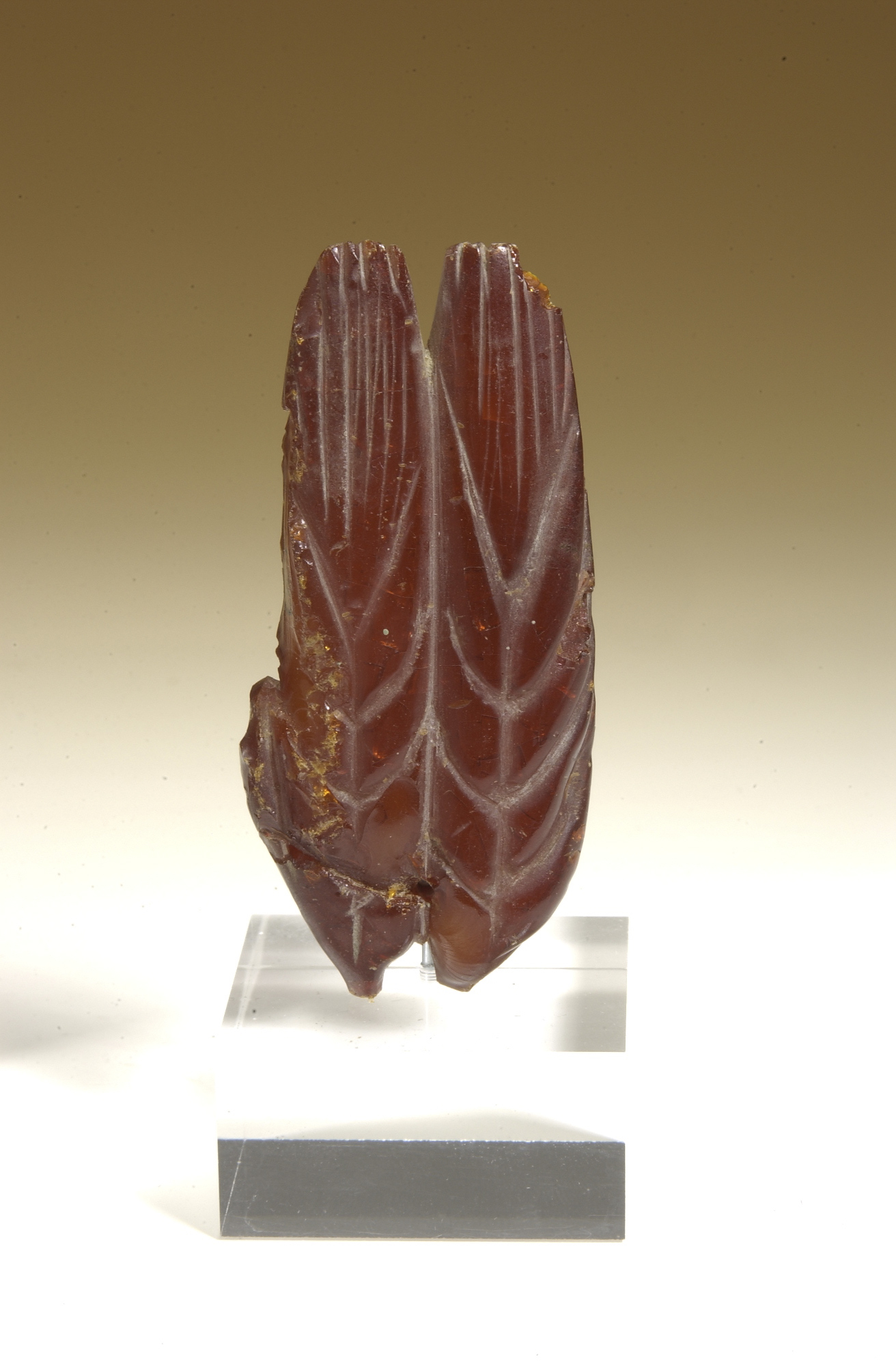
Amulet, amber, with ear of wheat, Roman period (69-96 AD)

Amulets were particularly prevalent in ancient Roman society, being the inheritor of the ancient Greek tradition, and inextricably linked to Roman religion and magic (see magic in the Graeco-Roman world). Amulets are usually outside of the normal sphere of religious experience, though associations between certain gemstones and gods has been suggested. For example, Jupiter is represented on milky chalcedony, Sol on heliotrope, Mars on red jasper, Ceres on green jasper, and Bacchus on amethyst. Amulets are worn to imbue the wearer with the associated powers of the gods rather than for any reasons of piety. The intrinsic power of the amulet is also evident from others bearing inscriptions, such as vterfexix (utere fexix) or "good luck to the user." Amulet boxes could also be used, such as the example from part of the Thetford treasure, Norfolk, UK, where a gold box intended for suspension around the neck was found to contain sulphur for its apotropaic (evil-repelling) qualities. Children wore bullas and lunulas, and could be protected by amulet-chains known as Crepundia.

== West Asia ==
Metal amulets in the form of flat sheets made of silver, gold, copper, and lead were also popular in late antiquity in Palestine and Syria as well as their adjacent regions (Mesopotamia, Anatolia, and Iran). Usually, they were rolled up and placed in a metal container with loops to be carried by a necklace. They were incised with a needle with manifold incantation formulars and citations and references to the name of God (Tetragrammaton). Most of them are composed in various kinds of Aramaic (Jewish Aramaic, Samaritan Aramaic, Christian Palestinian Aramaic, Mandaic, Syriac) and Hebrew, but there also sometimes exist combinations with Greek.

== East Asia ==
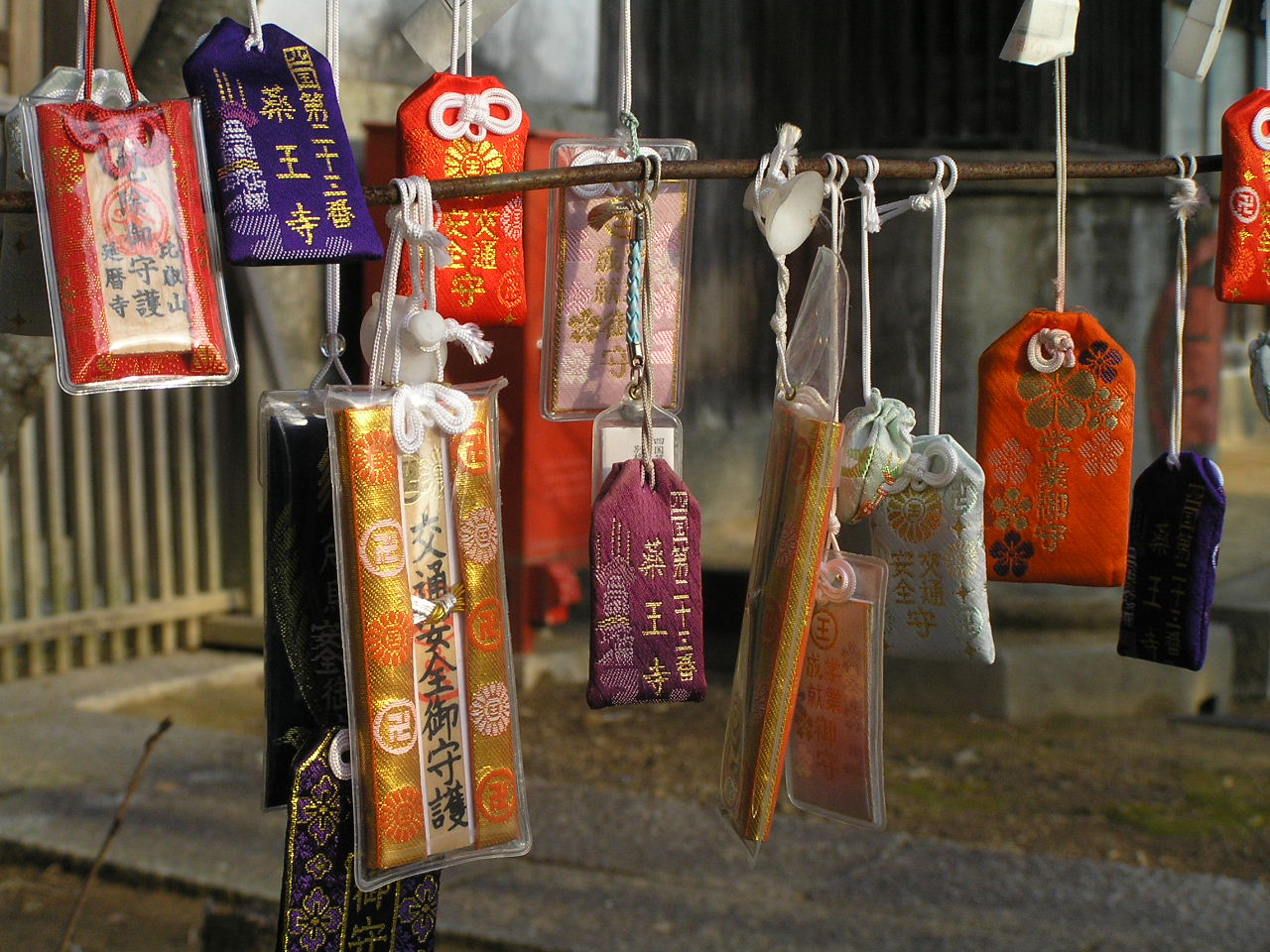
A selection of omamori, Japanese amulets

In China, Taoist specialists developed a special style of calligraphy called fulu, which they say is able to protect against evil spirits. The equivalent type of amulet in Japan is called an ofuda. Mamorifuda are gofu amulets. In Korea, where they are called bujeok (부적) even usually in the tradition of Korean Taoist rituals, they are talismans encased inside in small brocade bags that are carried on the person.

== Abrahamic religions ==
In antiquity and the Middle Ages, most Jews, Christians, and Muslims in the Orient believed in the protective and healing power of amulets or blessed objects. Many pagan religions also believe in stone worship. Talismans used by these peoples can be broken down into three main categories: talismans carried or worn on the body, talismans hung upon or above the bed of an infirm person, and medicinal talismans. This third category can be further divided into external and internal talismans. For example, an external amulet can be placed in a bath.

Jews, Christians, and Muslims have also at times used their holy books in a talisman-like manner in grave situations. For example, a bedridden and seriously ill person would have a holy book placed under part of the bed or cushion.

=== Judaism ===
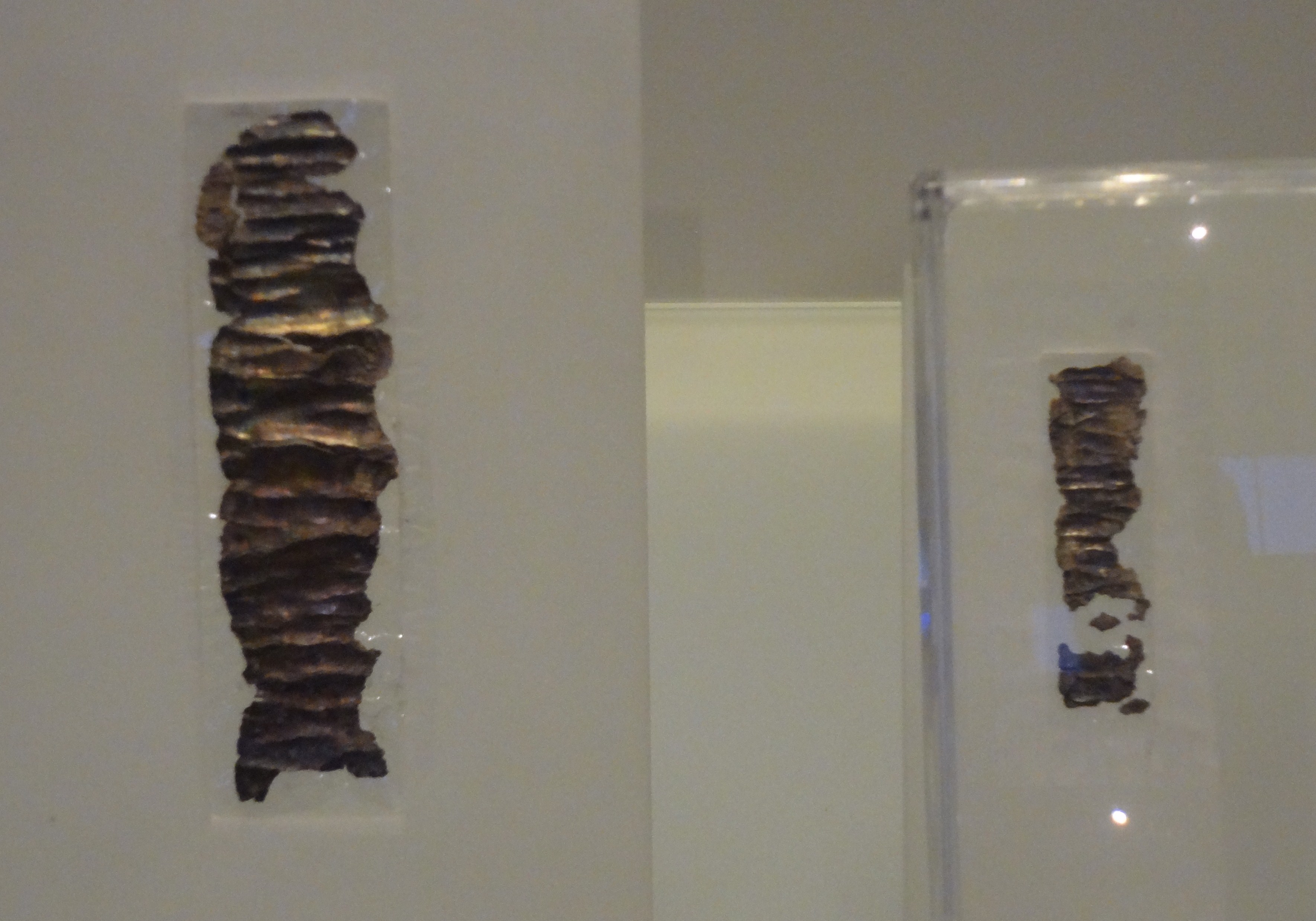
The Silver Scroll on display at the Israel Museum

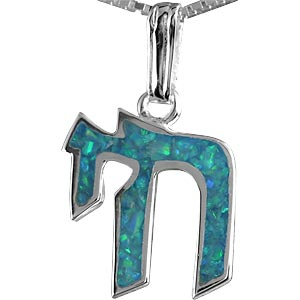
Chai pendant (modern)

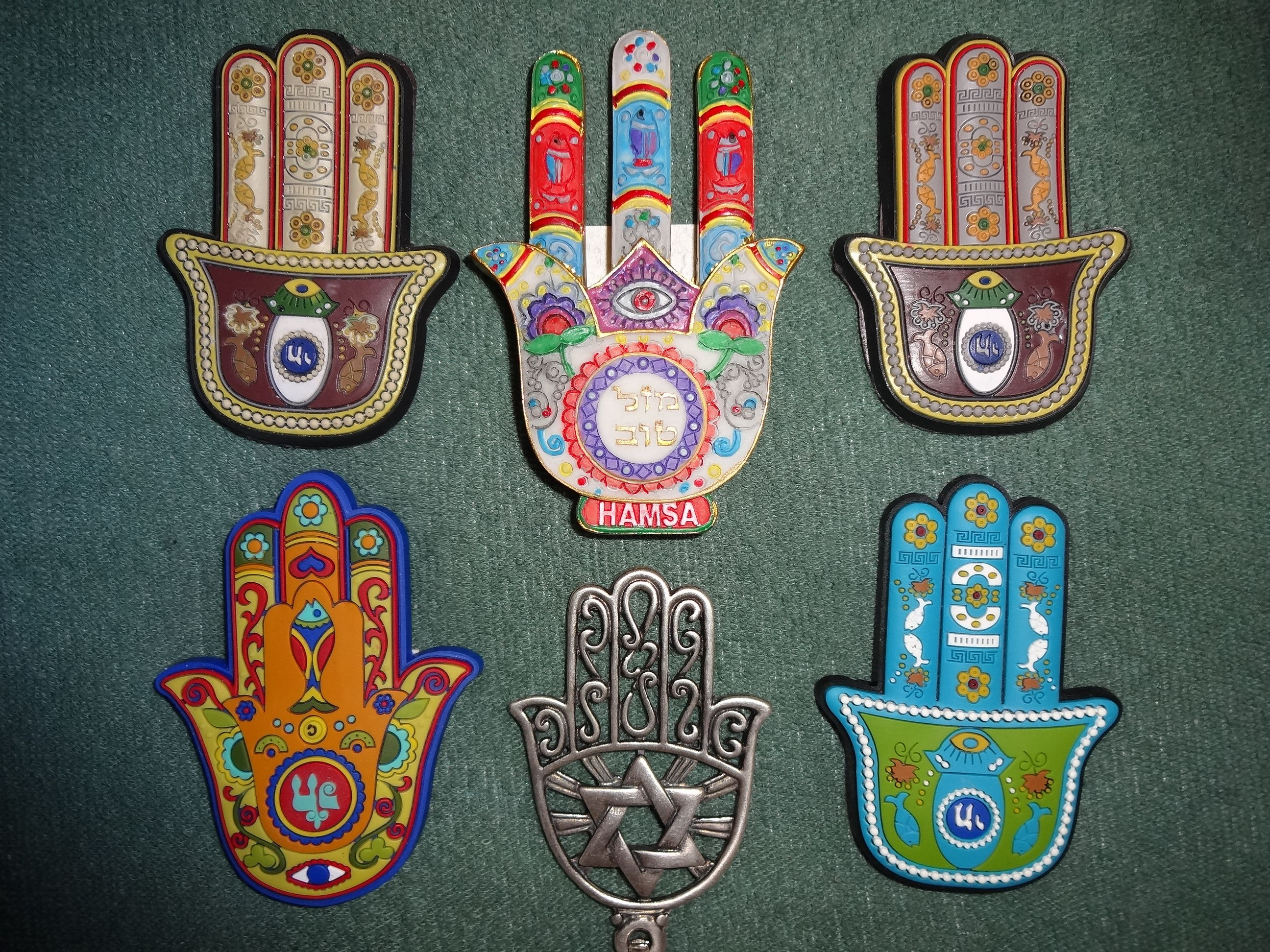
Examples of Hand of Miriam in contemporary Israel

Amulets are plentiful in the Jewish tradition, with examples of Solomon-era amulets existing in many museums. Due to the proscription of idols and other graven images in Judaism, Jewish amulets emphasize text and names. The shape, material, and color of a Jewish amulet makes no difference. Examples of textual amulets include the Silver Scroll (c. 630 BCE), the Chai necklace (though this is also worn simply to indicate Jewish identity), and inscriptions of one of the names of the god of Judaism - such as ה (He), יה (YaH), or שדי (Shaddai) - on a piece of parchment or metal, usually silver. Counter-examples, however, include the Hamsa (an outline of a human hand) and the Seal of Solomon.

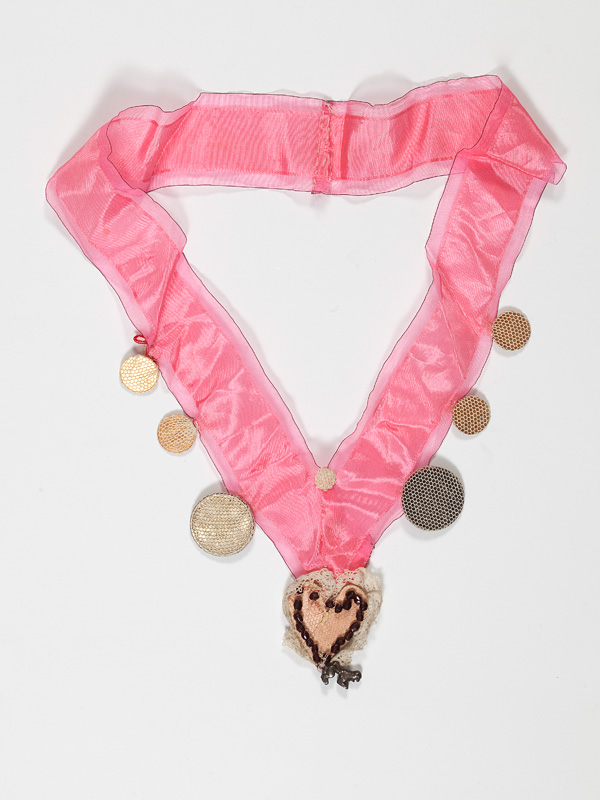
Protective neckband worn on a boy’s Brit Milah to protect him from demons and the evil eye. 1944, Basel, in the Jewish Museum of Switzerland’s collection.

During the Middle Ages, Maimonides and Sherira Gaon (and his son Hai Gaon) opposed the use of amulets and derided the "folly of amulet writers." Other rabbis, however, approved the use of amulets.

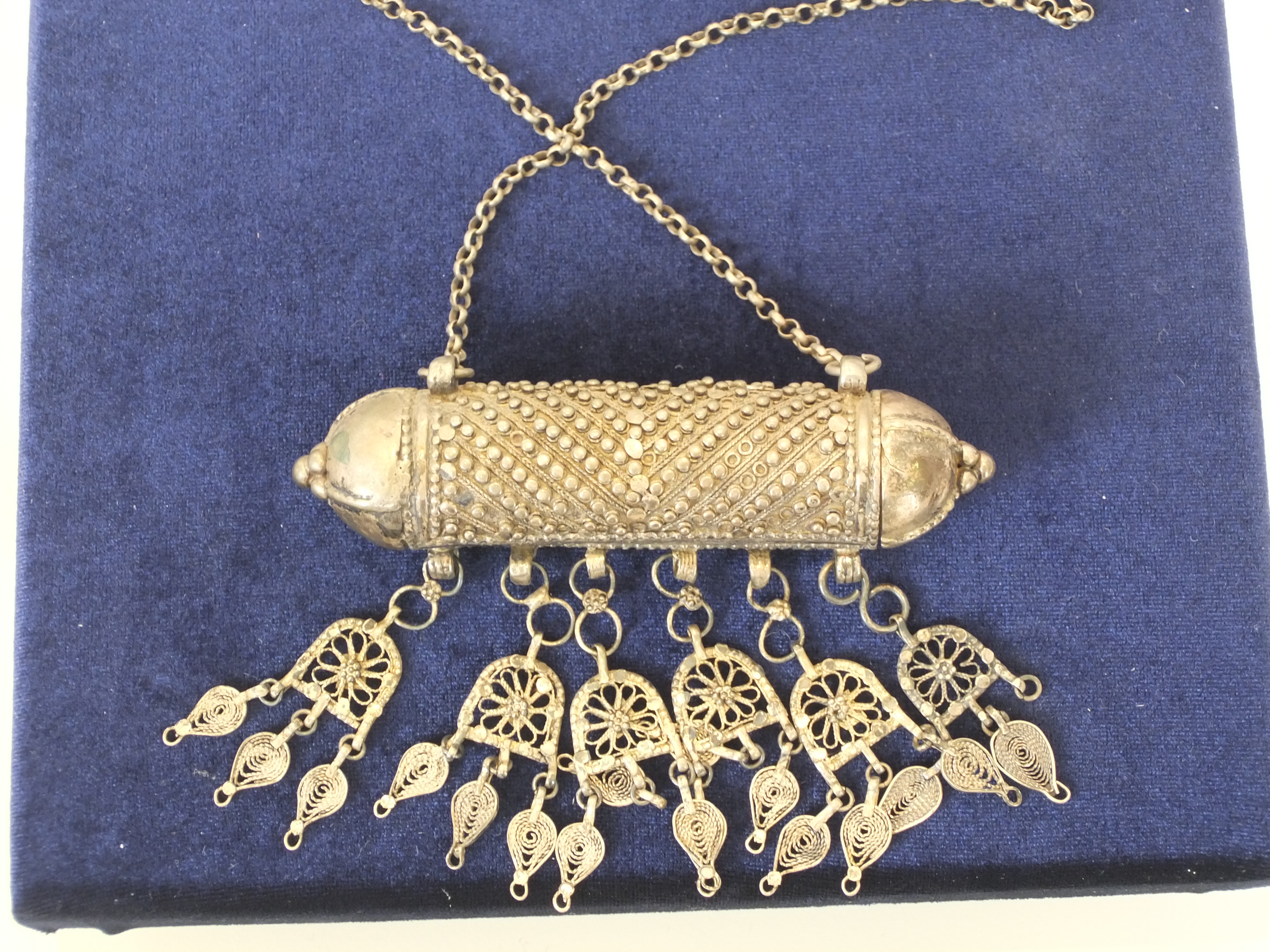
Silver amulet encasement

Regional traditions surrounding the birth of children often included amulets to ward off the devil, the evil eye, or demons such as Lilith. So-called miracle rabbi (Ba’al Shem) would be responsible for writing text amulets and conjuring up the names of God and protective angels. Midwives would also create amulets, often filled with herbs, to protect mothers and their young children. In Southern Germany, Alsace and areas of Switzerland, young Jewish boys wore textile neckbands or collars for their Brit Milah. Coins or coral stones on these neckbands were meant to distract the evil eye away from the boys, thus serving as a form of protection. This practice continued until the early 20th century.

The mezuzah and tefillin have been interpreted by some to be forms of amulet, but others disagree.

Rabbi and kabbalist Naphtali Cohen (1645–1719) was said to be an expert in the magical use of amulets. He was accused of causing a fire that broke out in his house and then destroyed the whole Jewish quarter of Frankfurt, and of preventing the extinguishing of the fire by conventional means because he wanted to test the power of his amulets; he was imprisoned and forced to resign his post and leave the city.

=== Christianity ===
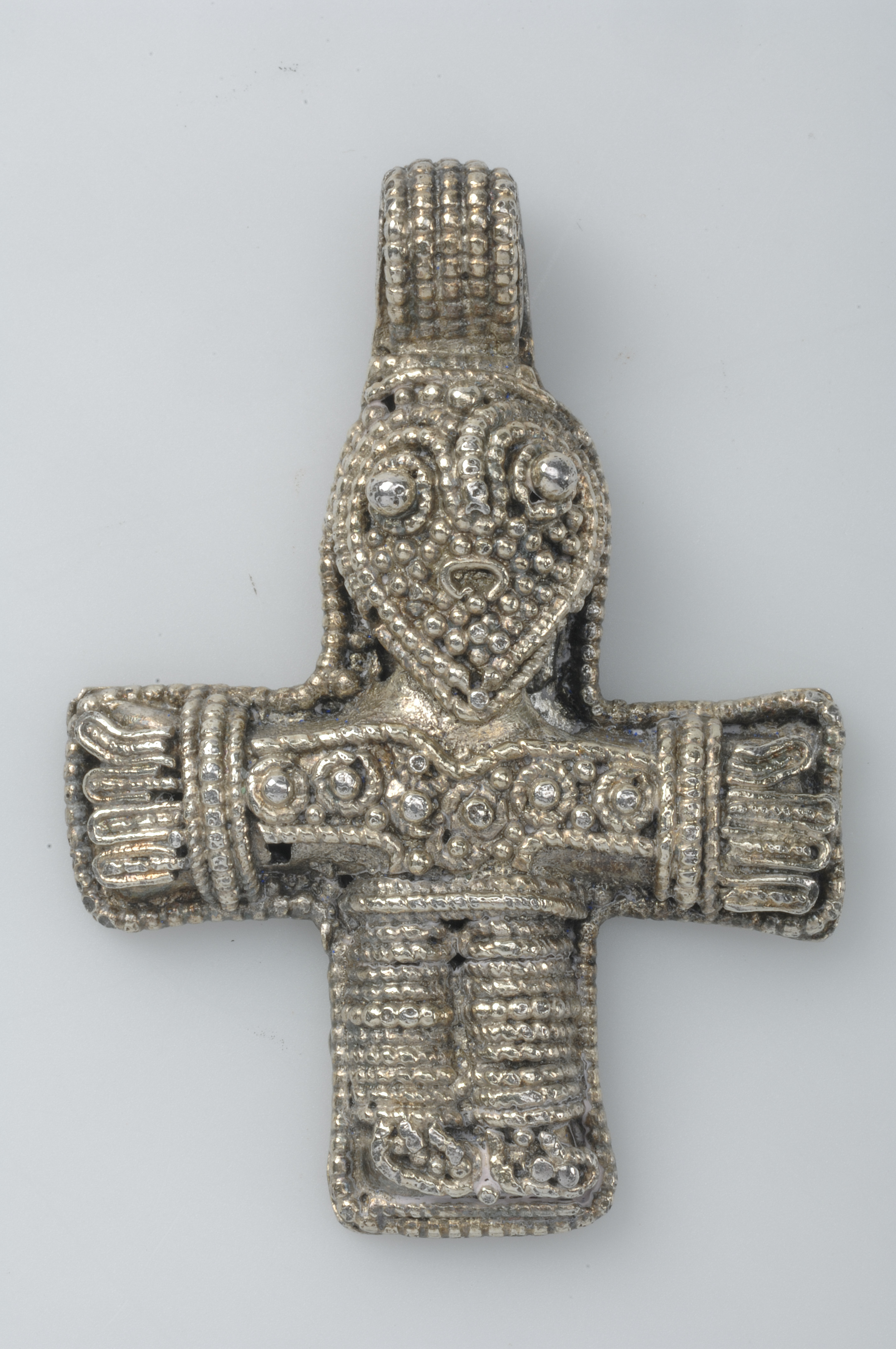
A pendant crucifix, considered in Christian tradition as a defense against demons, as the holy sign of Christ's victory over every evil

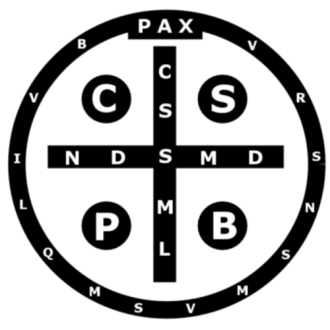
Back of the Saint Benedict medal with the Vade Retro Satana abbreviation, used in liturgical Western Christian traditions.

In Christianity, regularly attending church, frequently receiving Holy Communion, Bible study, and a consistent prayer life are taught as being among the best ways to ward against demonic influence. The Catholic, Oriental Orthodox, Eastern Orthodox, Lutheran, Anglican and Pentecostal denominations of Christianity hold that the use of sacramentals in its proper disposition is encouraged only by a firm faith and devotion to the Triune God, and not by any magical or superstitious belief bestowed on the sacramental. In this regard, prayer cloths, holy oil, prayer beads, cords, scapulars, medals, and other devotional religious paraphernalia derive their power, not simply from the symbolism displayed in the object, but rather from the blessing of the Church in the name of Jesus. Using an amulet to represent a commitment, remind oneself or others of a greater concept, or glorify a greater power is, however, not original (or unique) to Christianity.

The crucifix, and the associated sign of the cross, is one of the key sacramentals used by Christians to ward off evil since the time of the Early Church Fathers; as such, many Christians wear a cross necklace. The imperial cross of Conrad II (1024–1039) referred to the power of the cross against evil.

A well-known amulet associated with Benedictine spirituality present in Christianity of the Catholic, Lutheran and Anglican traditions is the Saint Benedict medal which includes the Vade Retro Satana formula to ward off Satan. This medal has been in use at least since the 1700s, and in 1742 it received the approval of Pope Benedict XIV. It later became part of the Roman Ritual.

Several Christian saints have written about the power of holy water as a force that repels evil; as such in Christianity (especially in the Catholic, Orthodox, Lutheran, and Anglican denominations), holy water is used in the dominical sacrament of baptism, as well as for devotional use in the home. Saint Teresa of Avila, a Doctor of the Church who reported visions of Jesus and Mary, was a strong believer in the power of holy water and wrote that she used it with success to repel evil and temptations.

Lay Catholics are not permitted to perform solemn exorcisms, but they can use holy water, blessed salt, and other sacramentals, such as the Saint Benedict medal or the crucifix, for warding off evil.

Some Catholic sacramentals are believed to defend against evil, by virtue of their association with a specific saint or archangel. The scapular of St. Michael the Archangel is a Roman Catholic devotional scapular associated with Archangel Michael, the chief enemy of Satan. Pope Pius IX gave this scapular his blessing, but it was first formally approved under Pope Leo XIII. The form of this scapular is somewhat distinct, in that the two segments of cloth that constitute it have the form of a small shield; one is made of blue and the other of black cloth, and one of the bands likewise is blue and the other black. Both portions of the scapular bear the well-known representation of the Archangel St. Michael slaying the dragon and the inscription "Quis ut Deus?" meaning "Who is like God?".

Since the 19th century, devout Spanish soldiers, especially Carlist units, have worn a patch with an image of the Sacred Heart of Jesus and the inscription detente bala ("stop, bullet").

Early Egyptian Christians made textual amulets with scriptural incipits, especially the opening words of the Gospels, the Lord's Prayer and Psalm 91. These amulets have survived from late antiquity (c. 300–700 C.E.), mostly from Egypt. They were written in Greek and Coptic on strips of papyrus, parchment and other materials in order to cure bodily illnesses and/or to protect individuals from demons.

Some believers, especially those of the Greek Orthodox tradition, wear the filakto, an Eastern Christian sacramental that is pinned to one's clothing to ward off Satan.

=== Islam ===
Percentage of Muslims, median of national values in region, 2012 survey.
Place	Wear amulets	Believe evil eye exists	Have objects against the evil eye
Southeast Europe	24	47	35
Central Asia	20	49	41
Southeast Asia	3	29	4
South Asia	26	53	40
Middle East/North Africa	25	65	18
Sub-Saharan Africa	no data	36	no data

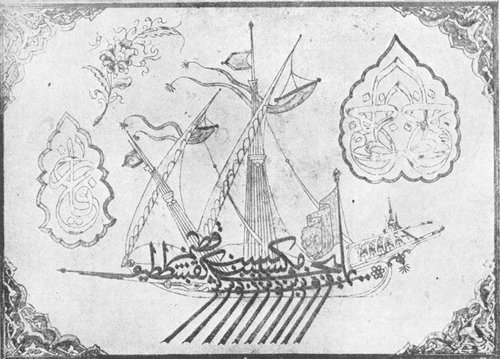
Amulet containing the names of the Seven Sleepers and their dog Qitmir, 1600s-1800s.

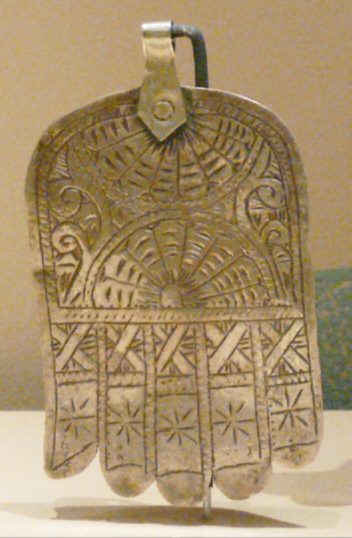
Berber hamsa or "Hand of Fatima" amulet in silver, Morocco, early 20th century.

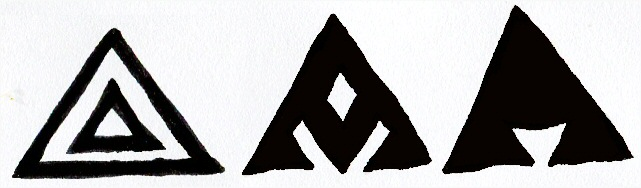
Amulet Kilim motif (3 examples).

There is a long cultural tradition of using amulets in Islam, and in many Muslim-majority countries, ten percent of the population use them. Some hadith condemn the wearing of talismans, and some Muslims (notably Salafis) believe that amulets and talismans are forbidden in Islam, and using them is an act of shirk (idolatry). Other hadith support the use of talismans with some Muslim denominations considering it 'permissible magic', usually under some conditions (for instance, that the wearer believes that the talisman only helps through God's will). Many Muslims do not consider items used against the evil eye to be talismans; these are often kept in the home rather than worn. Examples of worn amulets are necklaces, rings, bracelets, coins, armbands and talismanic shirts. In the Islamic context they can also be referred to as hafiz or protector or himala meaning pendant.

Amulet is interchangeable with the term talisman. An amulet is an object that is generally worn for protection and most often made from a durable material such as metal or a hard-stone. Amulet can also be applied to paper examples, although talisman is often used to describe these less robust and usually individualized forms. In Muslim cultures, amulets often include texts, particularly prayers, texts from the Quran, hadiths (recorded oral histories of early Islam) and religious narratives, and religious names. The word "Allah" (God) is especially popular, as many believe that touching or seeing it wards off evil. The ninety-nine names of God, and the names of the Islamic prophet Muhammad and his companions, are also used. The names of prophets and religious figures are felt to connect the wearer to the named person, protecting the wearer. The written stories of these people are also considered effective, and are sometimes illustrated with images of the religious figure or omens associated with them. Favoured figures include Solomon, Ali ibn Abi Talib and his sons Hasan and Husain, and the Seven Sleepers of Ephesus. Devotional manuals sometimes also promise that those reading them will be protected from demons and jinn. Apotropaic texts may even be incorporated into clothing. Weapons might also be inscribed with religious texts thought to confer protective powers. Scrolls with Qur'anic quotations, prophetic references and sacred symbols were common during war in the Ottoman Empire with Qur'anic verses such as 'victory is from God and conquest is near' (Qur. 6I:13) found on ta'wiz (or taʿwīdh; Arabic: تعويذ)) worn in combat. Texts packaged in tawiz ((Urdu: تعویز, Hindi: तावीज़)) were most often pre-made when used by the public, but literate wearers could change the verse upon their discretion. A tawiz may be a pendant, carvings on metal, or even framed duas. While criticized by some denominations, Sunni Muslims are permitted to wear ta'wiz as long as it consciously strengthens their bond with Allah and does not come from a belief the ta'wiz itself cures or protects.

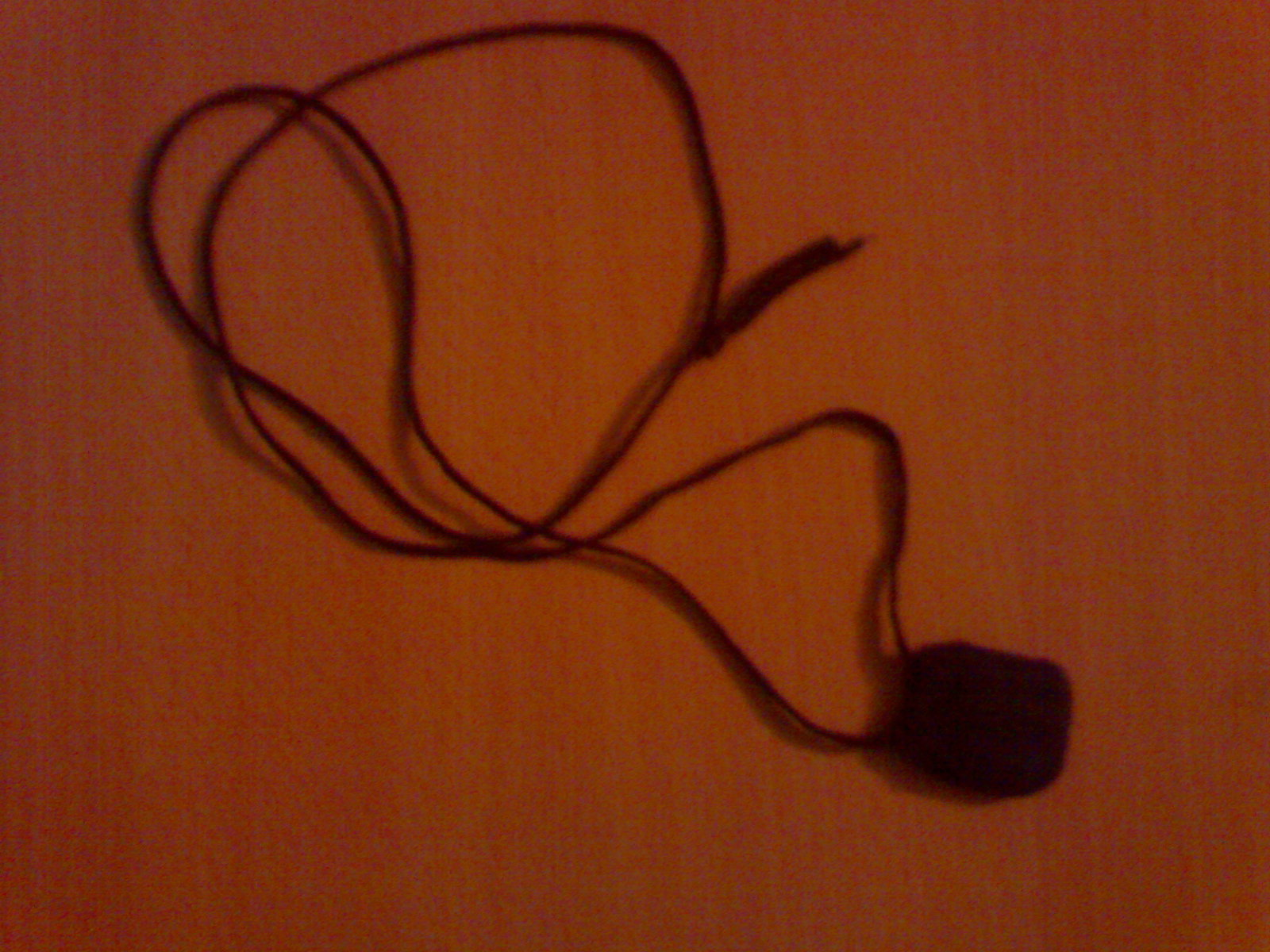
A tawiz. The black pouch contains a paper with duas (prayers) written on them.

The word ta'wiz, used in Urdu and Hindi comes from the Arabic. The Arabic word taʿwīdh, meaning "amulet" or "charm" is formed from the verb ʿawwadha, which means "to fortify someone with an amulet or incantation".

Astrological symbols were also used, especially in the Medieval period. These included symbols of the Zodiac, derived from Greek representations of constellations, and especially popular in the Middle East in the twelfth to the fourteenth centuries. Muslim artists also developed personifications of the planets, based on their astrological traits, and of a hypothetical invisible planet named Al Tinnin or Jauzahr. It was believed that objects decorated with these astrological signs developed talismanic power to protect.

Abstract symbols are also common in Muslim amulets, such as the Seal of Solomon and the Zulfiqar (sword of the aforementioned Ali). Another popular amulet often used to avert the evil gaze is the hamsa (meaning five) or "Hand of Fatima". The symbol is pre-Islamic, known from Punic times.

In Central and West Asia, amulets (often in the form of triangular packages containing a sacred verse) were traditionally attached to the clothing of babies and young children to give them protection from forces such as the evil eye. Triangular amulet motifs were often also woven into oriental carpets such as kilims. The carpet expert Jon Thompson explains that such an amulet woven into a rug is not a theme: it actually is an amulet, conferring protection by its presence. In his words, "the device in the rug has a materiality, it generates a field of force able to interact with other unseen forces and is not merely an intellectual abstraction."

==== Materiality of Islamic amulets ====
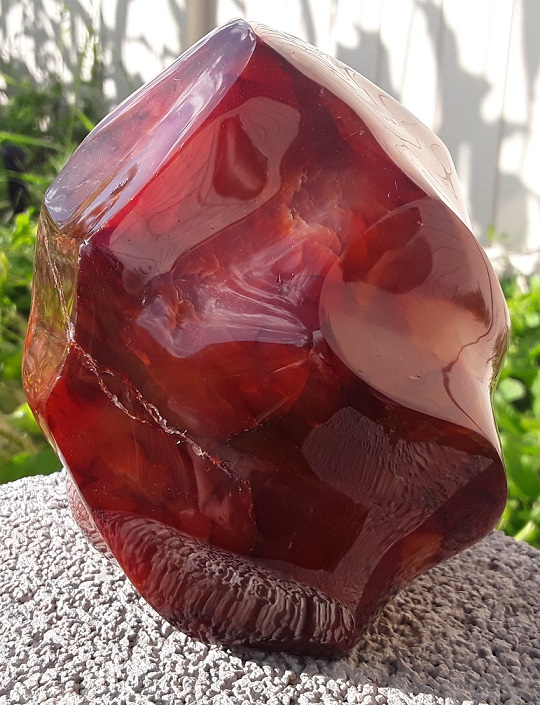
Carnelian 'flame'

In the Islamic world, material composition and graphic content are important in determining the apotropaic forces of the amulets. The preferred materials employed by amulets are precious and semi-precious materials, because the inherent protective values of these materials depend hugely upon their natural rarity, monetary value, and symbolic implications. Among the semi-precious materials, carnelian ('aqiq) is often favoured because it was considered as the stone of Muhammad, who was said to have worn a carnelian seal set in silver on the little finger of his right hand. Besides, materials such as jade and jasper are regarded as to possess protective and medicinal properties, including assuring victory in battles, protection from lightning and treating diseases of the internal organs. Sometimes, amulets combine different materials to achieve multiple protective effects. A combination of jade and carnelian, for instance, connotes fertility and embryogenesis. The reddish, transcalent quality of the cornelian resembles blood, which echoes the clot of congealed blood from which Allah created human (Qur. 96:2). Additionally, recurring apotropaic Qur'anic verses are often inscribed on the amulet, praising Allah as the ultimate bestower of security and power and as the provider of the Qur'an and Muhammad.

==== Diminutive Islamic amulets ====
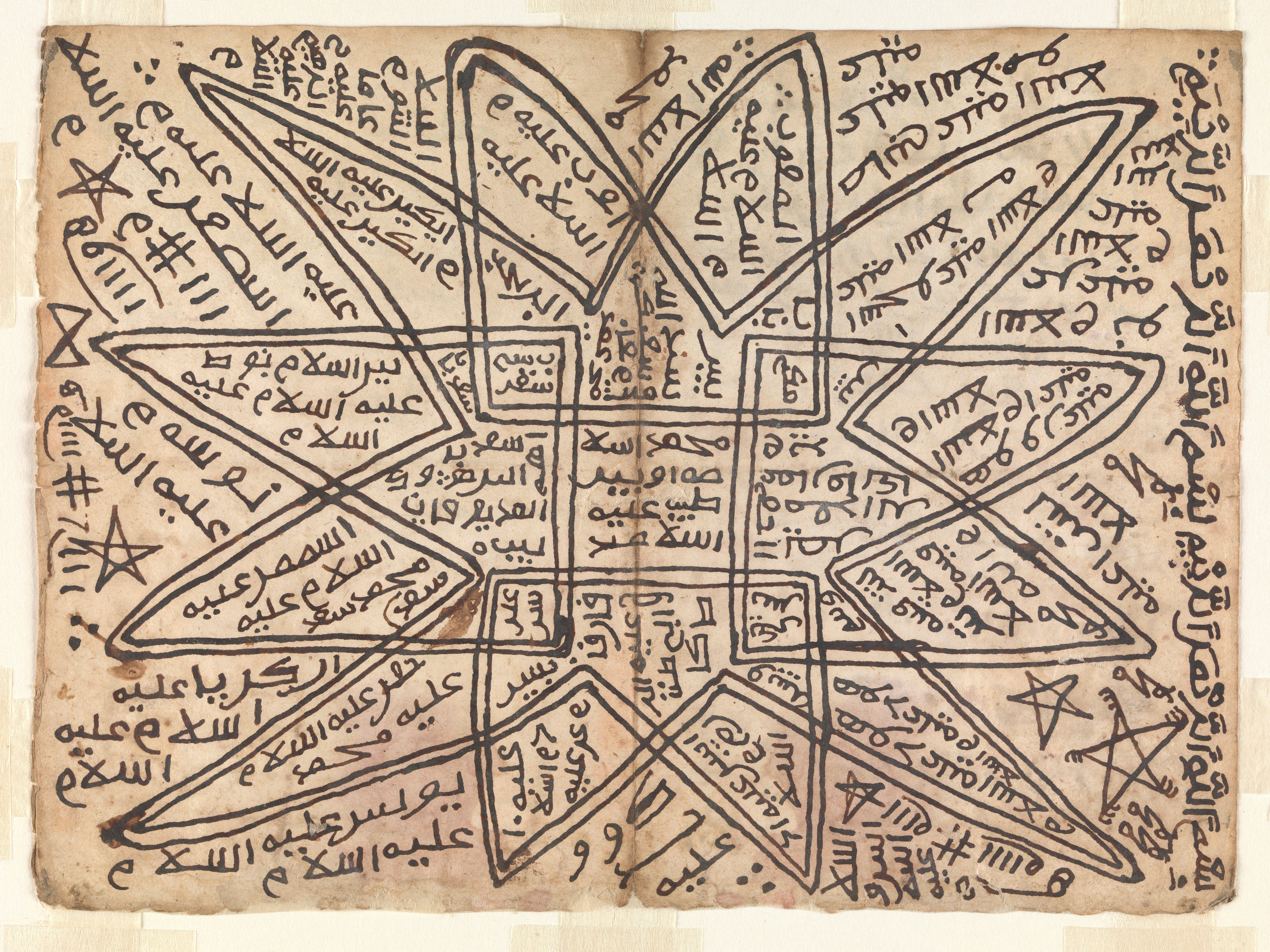
Drawing of an amulet includes spells against the 'evil eye'.

Diminutive amulets made in the medieval Mediterranean Islamic world include prayers executed with a block print or die (tarsh). Through folding, these miniature paper amulets are often even further reduced in size in order to fit into a tiny wearable box or tubular pendant cases. In other cases, however, these protective objects remain fully loyal to the book format as miniature Qur'ans, protected by illuminated metal cases.

In the Aga Khan Museum, Toronto, rests an example of an Egyptian block printed amulet, made during the tenth or eleventh century. Here, one can notice the minuscule ink on paper script of the size of 7.2 x 5.5 cm. Its text's final line is a verse from the Qur'an that proclaims: 'So God will safeguard you from them. He is All-Hearing and All-Knowing' (Qur. 20:46). A tension is therefore created between the idea of Allah as protector and the amulet as a material item that encapsulates and transmits this divine energy. Amulets and talismanic objects were used by early Muslims to appeal to God in the first instance. In this respect, these early Islamic amulets differ substantially from Byzantine, Roman, early Iranian, and other pre-Islamic magic which addressed demonic forces or spirits of the dead. The main function of amulets was to ward off misfortune, "evil eye", and the jinn. They were meant to promote health, longevity, fertility, and potency. Despite regional variations, what unites these objects is that they are characterized by the use of particular and distinctive vocabulary of writings and symbols. These can appear in a multitude of combinations. The important elements to these amulets are the 'magic'vocabulary used and the heavy implementation of the Qur'an. The regional variations of these amulets each are unique; however, they are tied together through the Quranic inscriptions, images of Muhammad, astrological signs, and religious narratives. Such text amulets were originally housed within a lead case imprinted with surat al-Ikhlas (Qur. n2: 1-4), a verse that instructs the worshipper to proclaim God's sanctity. As seen in a diverse range of block printed amulets, the lead case should include lugs, which allowed the tiny package to be either sewn onto clothing or suspended from the owner's body. These modest containers were, most likely, kept sealed shut, their printed contents therefore invisible to a possessor who perhaps was not wealthy enough to purchase a non-serialised, handwritten amulet.

== Hinduism ==
Tawiz worn by Hindus often bears the sacred Om symbol.

== Buddhism ==
=== Tibet ===
The Tibetan Buddhists have many kinds of talismanic and shamanistic amulets and ritual tools, including the dorje, the bell, and many kinds of portable amulets. The dorje represent the unbreakable reality of nature and steadfast spiritual strength and enlightenment. The Tibetan Buddhists enclose prayers on a parchment scroll within a prayer wheel, which is then spun around, each rotation being one recitation of all of the stanzas within the prayer wheel.

=== Thailand ===
The people of Thailand, with Buddhist and animist beliefs, also have a vast pantheon of amulets, which are still popular and in common use by most people even in the present day. The belief in magic is impregnated into Thai culture and religious beliefs and folk superstitions, and this is reflected in the fact that we can still see commonplace use of amulets and magical rituals in everyday life. Some of the more commonly known amulets are of course the Buddhist votive tablets, such as the Pra Somdej Buddha image, and guru monk coins. But Thailand has an immensely large number of magical traditions, and thousands of different types of amulet and occult charm can be found in use, ranging from the takrut scroll spell, to the necromantic Ban Neng Chin Aathan, which uses the bones or flesh of the corpse of a 'hoeng prai' ghost (a person who died unnaturally, screaming, or in other strange premature circumstances), to reanimate the spirit of the dead, to dwell within the bone as a spirit, and assist the owner to achieve their goals. The list of Thai Buddhist amulets in existence is a lifetime study in its own right, and indeed, many people devote their lives to the study of them, and collection. Thai amulets are still immensely popular both with Thai folk as well as with foreigners, and in recent years, a massive increase in foreign interest has caused the subject of Thai Buddhist amulets to become a commonly known topic around the world. Amulets can fetch prices ranging from a few dollars right up to millions of dollars for a single amulet. Due to the money that can be made with sorcery services, and with rare collector amulets of the master class, there is also a forgery market in existence, which ensures that the experts of the scene maintain a monopoly on the market. With so many fakes, experts are needed for collectors to trust for obtaining authentic amulets, and not selling them fakes.

== Other cultures ==
Amulets vary considerably according to their time and place of origin. In many societies, religious objects serve as amulets, e.g. deriving from the ancient Celts, the clover, if it has four leaves, symbolizes good luck (not the Irish shamrock, which symbolizes the Christian Trinity).

In Bolivia, the god Ekeko furnishes a standard amulet, to whom one should offer at least one banknote or a cigarette to obtain fortune and welfare.

In certain areas of India, Nepal, and Sri Lanka, it is traditionally believed that the jackal's horn can grant wishes and reappear to its owner at its own accord when lost. Some Sinhalese believe that the horn can grant the holder invulnerability in any lawsuit.

The Native American movement of the Ghost Dance wore ghost shirts to protect them from bullets.

The Makonde people of East Africa use dilishi (sing. ilishi), protective amulets designed to ward off certain kinds of black magic.

In the Philippines, amulets are called agimat or anting-anting. According to folklore, the most powerful anting-anting is the hiyas ng saging (directly translated as pearl or gem of the banana). The hiyas must come from a mature banana and only comes out during midnight. Before the person can fully possess this agimat, he must fight a supernatural creature called kapre. Only then will he be its true owner. During Holy Week, devotees travel to Mount Banahaw to recharge their amulets.

== Gallery ==
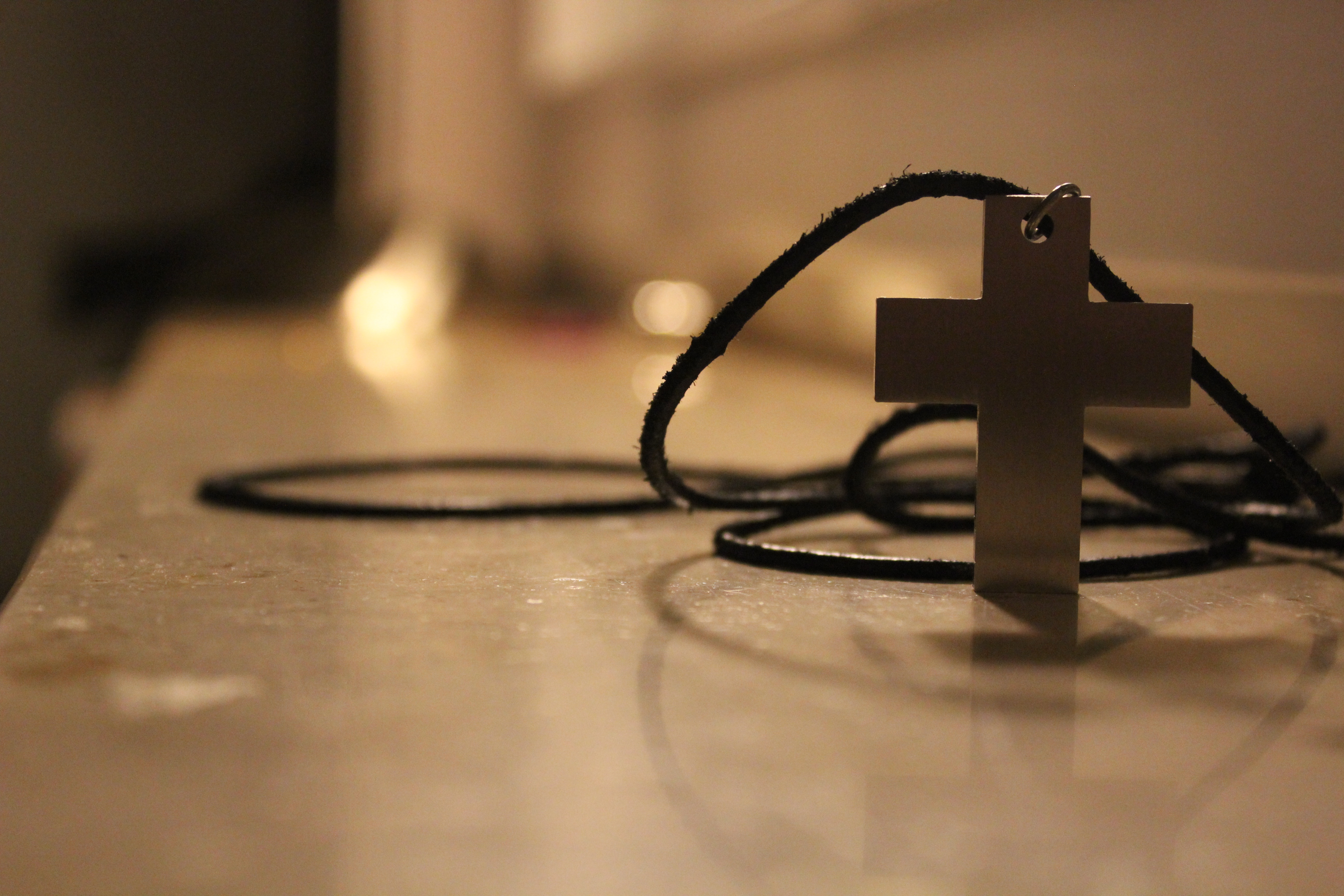
A cross necklace

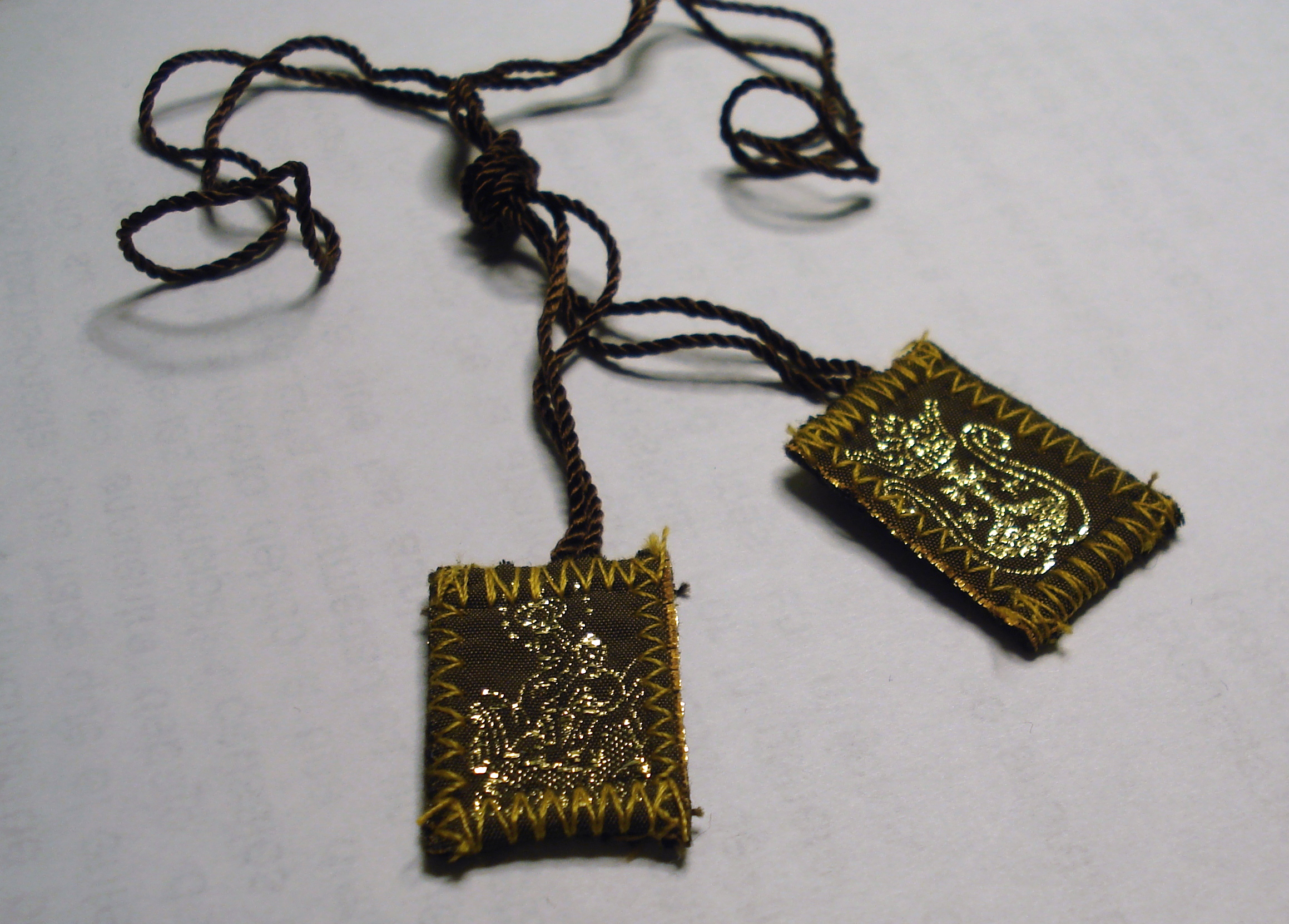
Scapular of Our Lady of Mount Carmel or "Brown Scapular"

Sator Square, an ancient Roman amulet in the form of a palindromic word square

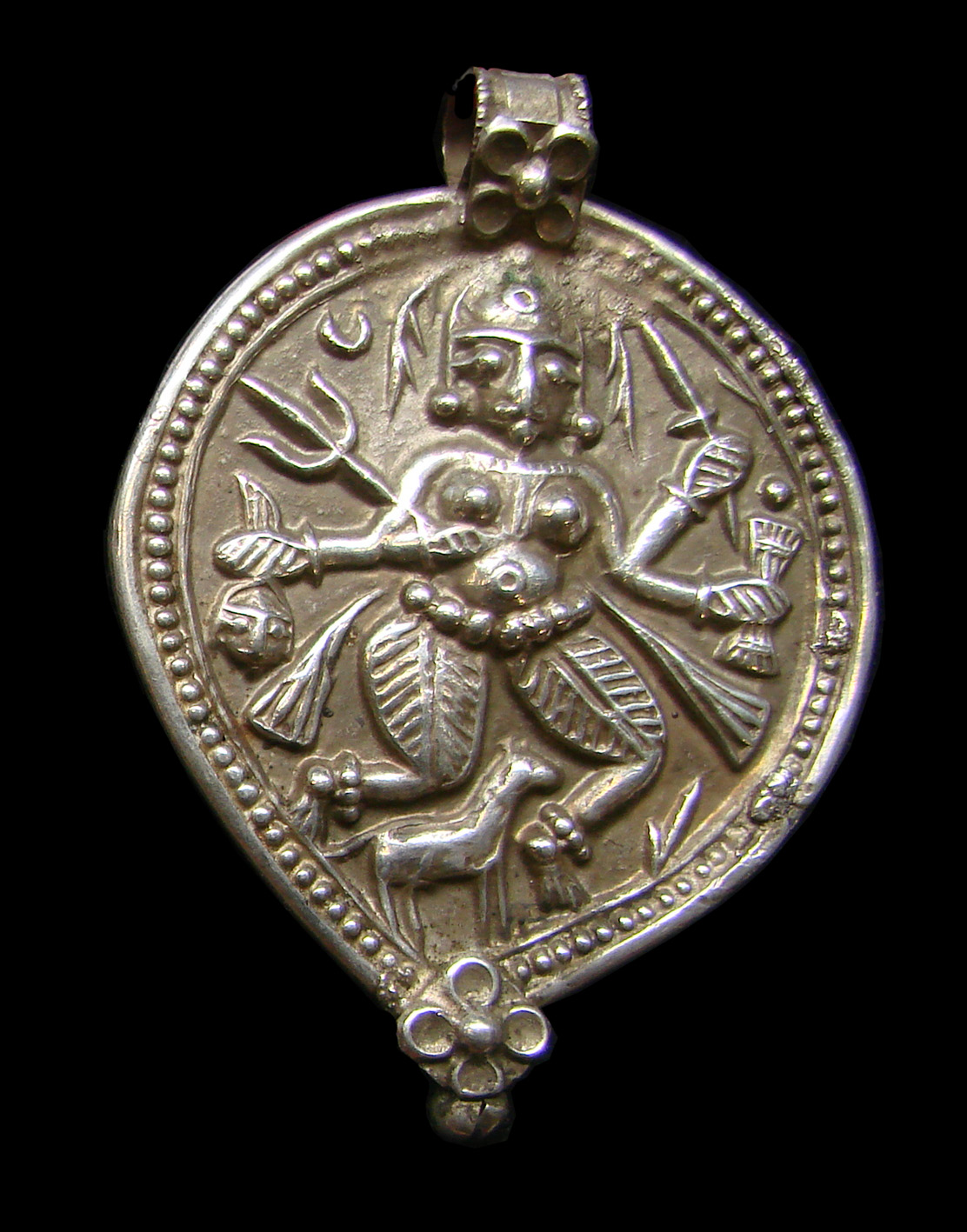
Amulet from Rajasthan, depicting the goddess Durga

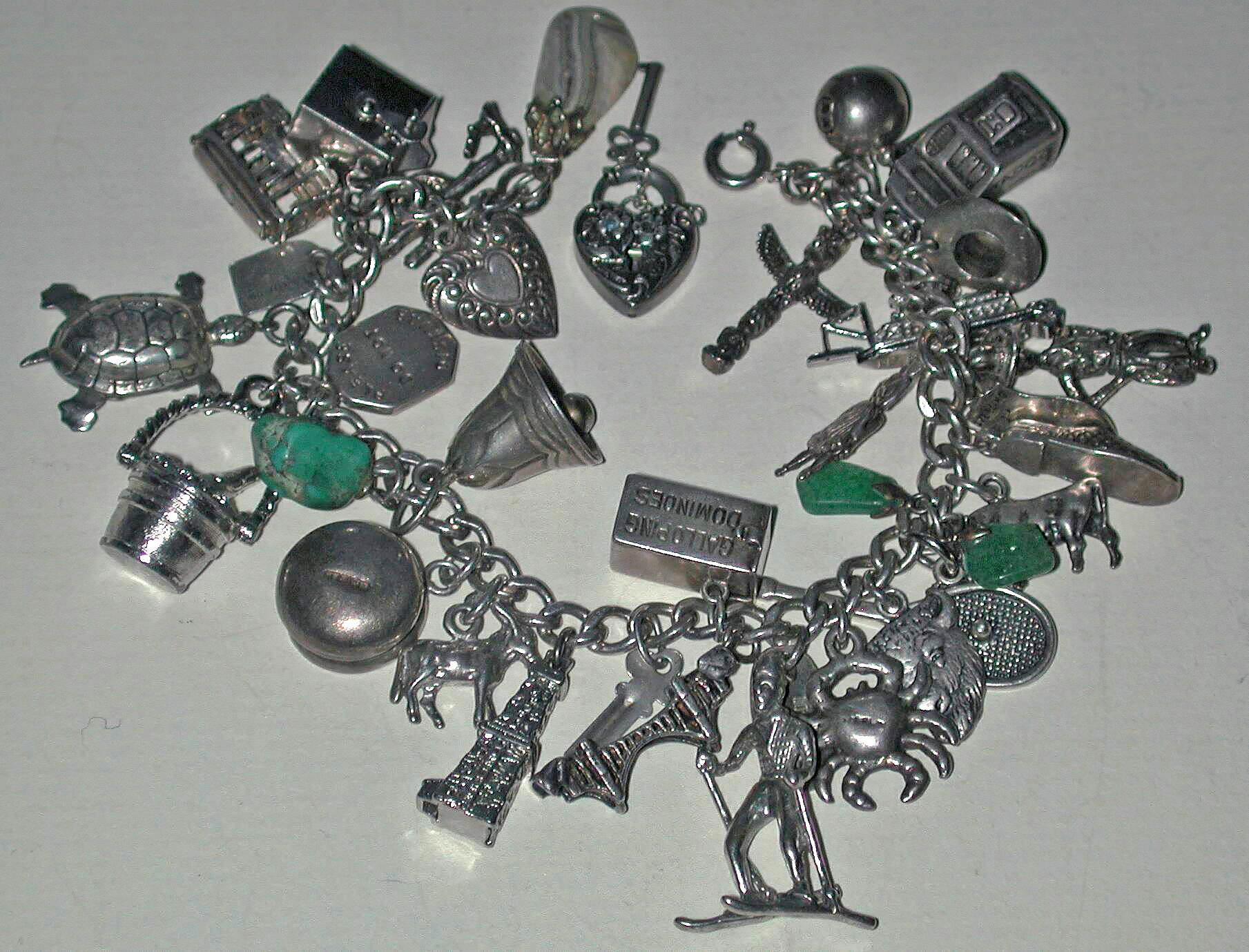
Charm bracelet

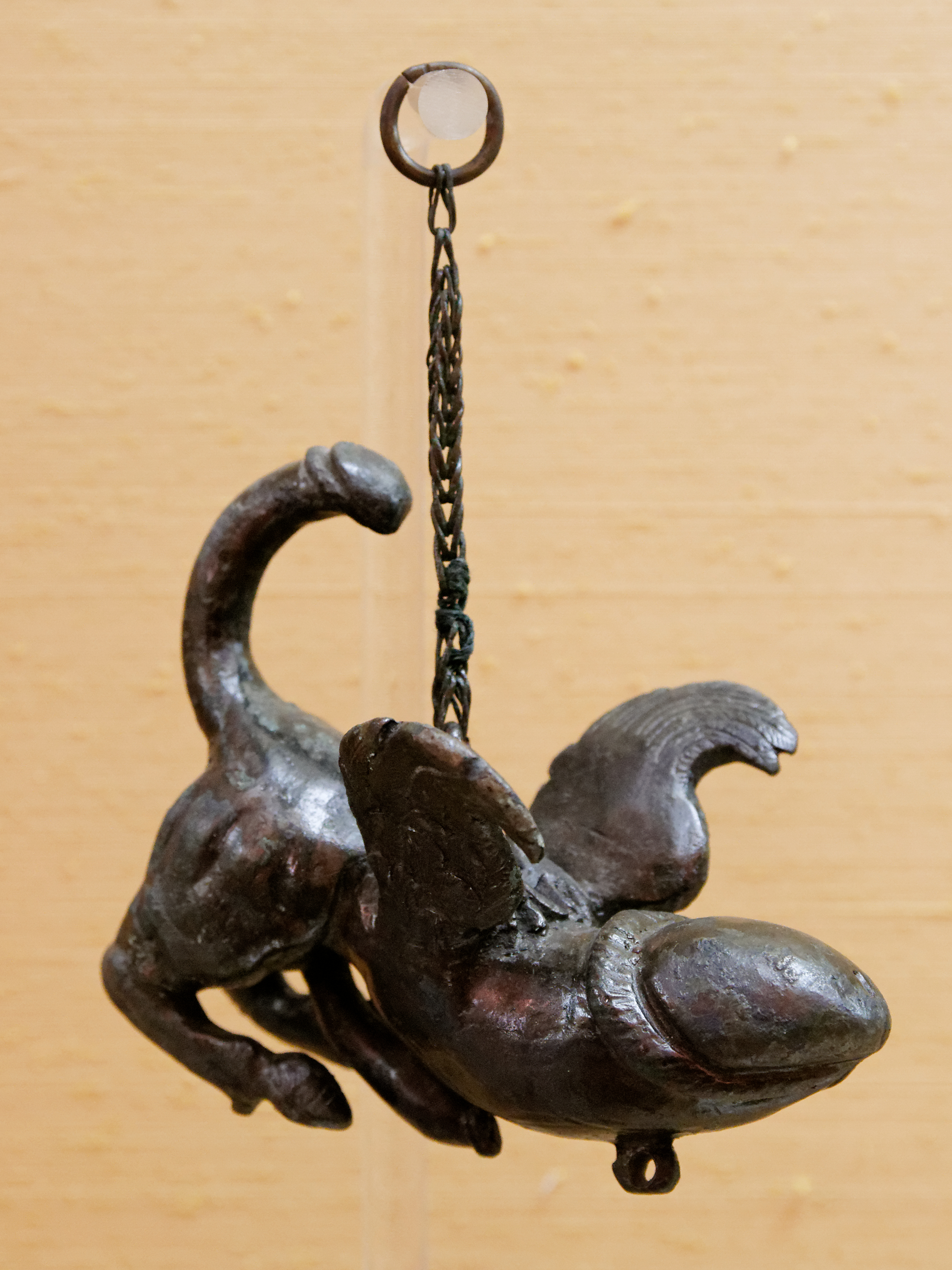
A fascinus, an ancient Roman amulet in the form of a phallus that served as a ritual feature of Roman wind chimes, from Pompeii

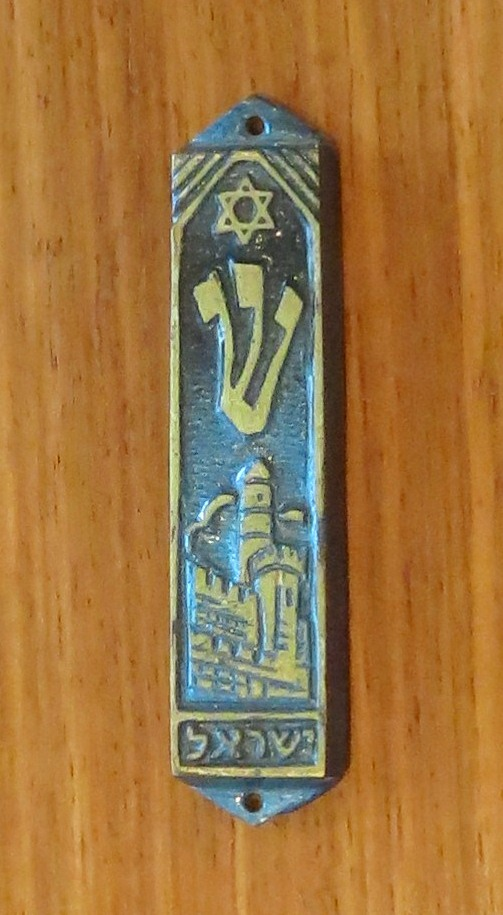
A mezuzah

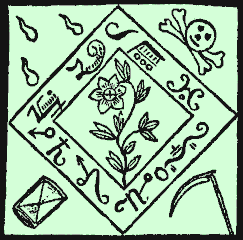
An amulet from the Black Pullet grimoire

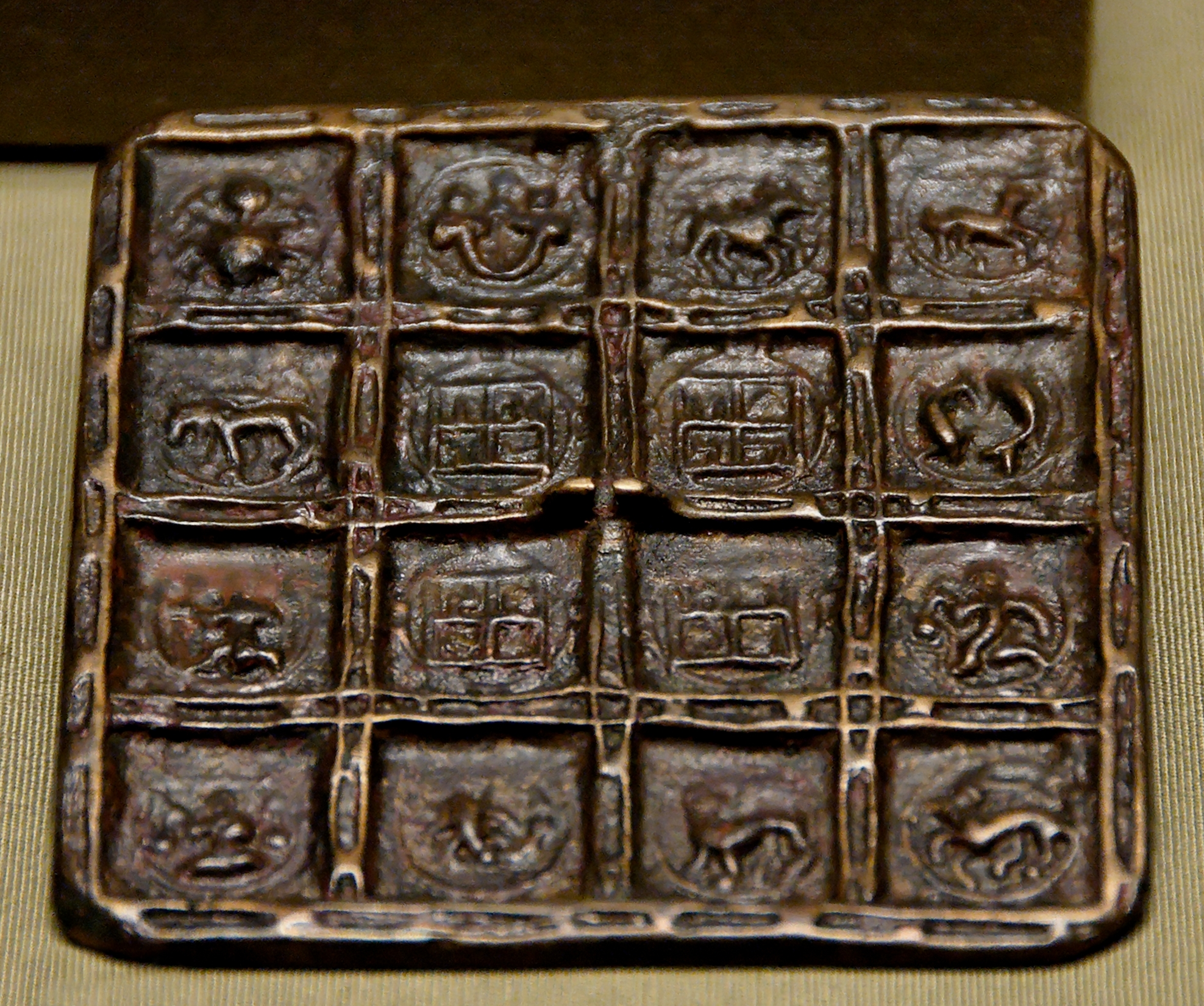
Magical mirror with Zodiac signs

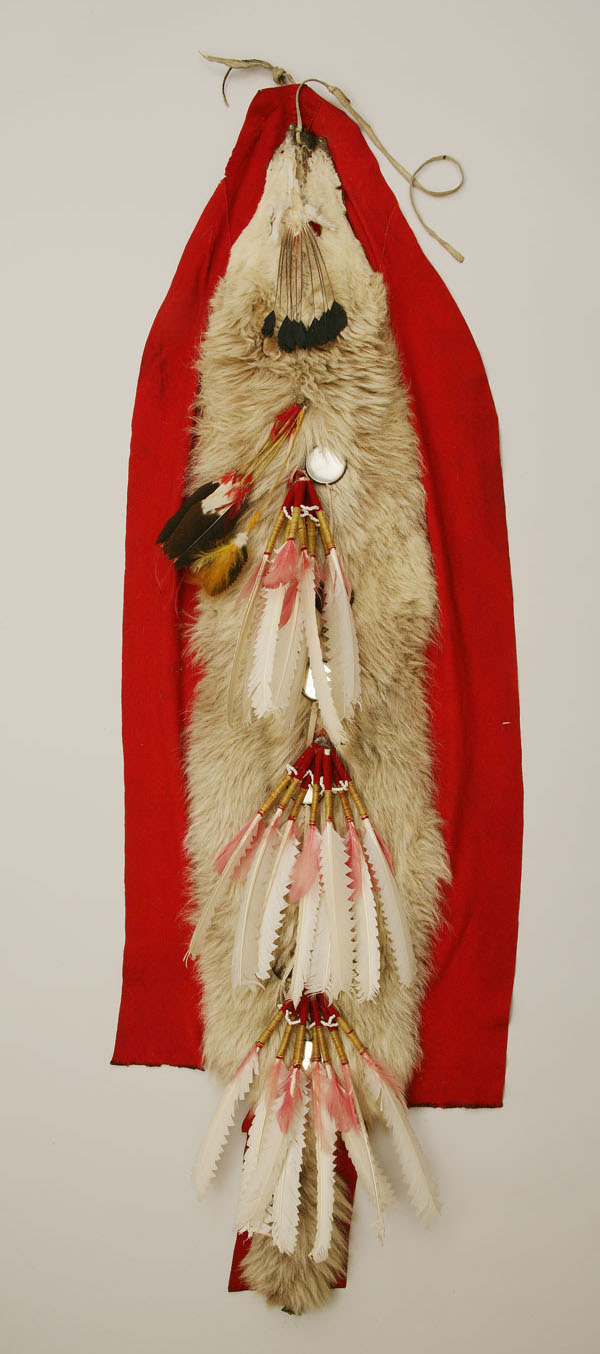
Nez Perce talisman, made of wolf skin, wool, mirrors, feathers, buttons and a brass bell

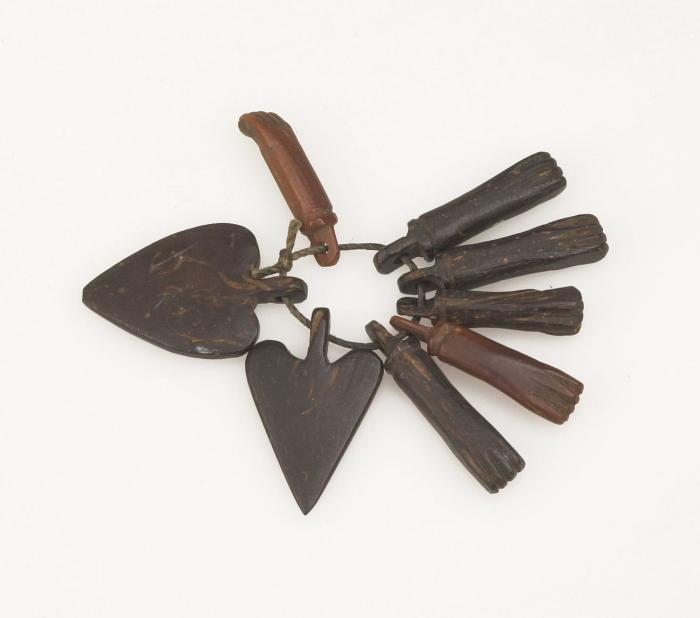
Afro-Surinamese Winti amulet

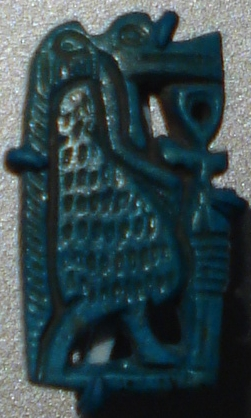
Ancient Egyptian Taweret amulet, New Kingdom, Dynasty XVIII, c. 1539–1292 BC

Omamori amulet from a Shinto shrine in Kumamoto, Japan

== See also ==
- Apotropaic magic - protective magic
- Charm - an incantation or spell
- Charm bracelet
- Charmstone
- Evil eye
- Fetishism
- Hamsa
- List of good-luck charms
- Nazar (amulet)
- Sigil
- Talisman
- Tefillin (or phylacteries) of the Jewish faith
