= Karl Shuker =

British zoologist, cryptozoologist and author (born 1959)

Karl P.N. Shuker
- Born: 9 December 1959 (age 66); West Midlands, England
- Education: PhD Zoology & comparative physiology (University of Birmingham, UK)
- Occupations: Cryptozoologist; Zoological consultant Media consultant Author
- Website: http://www.karlshuker.com

Karl Shuker (born 9 December 1959) is a British zoologist, cryptozoologist and author. He lives in the Midlands, England, where he works as a zoological consultant and writer. A columnist in Fortean Times and contributor to various magazines, Shuker is also the editor-in-chief of the Journal of Cryptozoology, which began in November 2012.

== Career ==
Shuker received a BSc (Hons) in zoology from the University of Leeds and a PhD in zoology and comparative physiology from the University of Birmingham. He is a Scientific Fellow of the Zoological Society of London, a Fellow of the Royal Entomological Society, a consultant for the Centre for Fortean Zoology, and a member of the Society of Authors.

Some of his larger works include Mystery Cats of the World (1989), The Lost Ark: New and Rediscovered Animals of the 20th Century (1993; expanded in 2002 as The New Zoo), and In Search of Prehistoric Survivors (1995), as well as two worldwide bestsellers – Dragons: A Natural History (1995; reissued in 2006), and The Unexplained (1996; reissued in 2002). Shuker also published Star Steeds and Other Dreams, a book of poetry which appeared in 2009.

According to Jonathan Downes, there are a number of little-known cryptids to which Shuker was the first cryptozoologist to bring widespread public attention. These include the Sri Lankan horned jackal and Devil Bird, Gambo the Gambian sea serpent, Goodenough Island mystery bird, New Guinea ropen and devil pig or gazeka, Scottish earth hound, Indonesian veo and horned cat, New Caledonian du, Irish dobhar-chú, Shatt al Arab venomous mystery fish, Zanzibar makalala, Ethiopian death bird, Zululand kondlo, Arctic North American waheela, Kellas cat, Mongolian Death Worm, Hungarian reedwolf, Fujian blue or Maltese tiger as shown on the cover of Mysteries of Planet Earth (1999), Welsh cenaprugwirion, bigfin squid, St Helena sirenian, Timor Sea ground shark, and crowing crested cobra.

Shuker pens two cryptozoological columns ("Alien Zoo" and "The Lost Ark") in Fortean Times, and contributes regularly to Strange Magazine, to Fate Magazine, and to Paranormal Magazine. In addition, he is the zoological consultant for Guinness World Records.

In a 2012 interview, Shuker stated that three of the most important zoological discoveries of the twentieth century were the okapi, the coelacanth and the saola (or Vu Quang ox). Shuker's 2012 volume, The Encyclopaedia of New and Rediscovered Animals provides a detailed discussion of similar discoveries, including discoveries made as recently as 2011.

In November 2012, Shuker launched the Journal of Cryptozoology. As the journal's founding editor-in-chief, Shuker has the stated goal of "providing an outlet for cryptozoological research with a genuinely scientific approach," with the hope of elevating the field's reputation among the scientific community. Upon announcing plans to start the new journal, Shuker had expressed "hope that cryptozoological researchers will submit papers to the journal that are totally worthy of publication in mainstream zoological journals but which may not be accepted by them simply because their subject is cryptozoological." Remarking that many newly discovered or rediscovered species begin as cryptids, Shuker believes that the field of cryptozoology is at a disadvantage, noting "as soon as one of its subjects is confirmed to be real, it is no longer cryptozoological but zoological instead."

== Scientific approach ==
Shuker engages in what he describes as the scientific investigation of "animals still awaiting formal zoological detection and description in the 21st century." However, Shuker is critical of investigators who set out to uncritically validate their preconceptions, stating that such activity is not serious cryptozoology.

Shuker's approach also sometimes leads to a more reserved position regarding cryptid claims. Having investigated the mystery of the chupacabra, Shuker noted in an interview with Benjamin Radford that the inconsistencies surrounding descriptions and accounts of the creature made it difficult to separate actual reports from folklore.

Based on his interpretation of available accounts and evidence of the creature, Shuker hypothesized that the chupacabra itself might be "a nonexistent composite" resulting from accounts of "different entities [...] all being lumped together."

== Critical reception ==
In a 1996 review of Shuker's book Dragons: A Natural History in Natural History, Richard Ellis discussed the "impressive assortment of illustrations," as well as Shuker's coverage of dragon imagery and icons throughout history, but criticized a lack of focus on "the 'real' animals held to be responsible for some of the dragon or sea serpent stories, such as the crocodile, the Komodo dragon, the African rock python, and the oarfish." Ellis found fault with coverage of "aquatic serpent dragons" such as the Loch Ness monster, lamenting that "despite corroborated evidence that the famous Loch Ness monster's 'surgeon's photograph' was a hoax, [...] 'Nessie' is one of the contemporary 'dragons' in this book."

In June 1997 Shuker criticized Fortean Times publisher Mike Dash, who has described most reports of strange phenomena to be products of the imagination, to which Shuker stated, "there are some intriguing pieces of evidence for the existence of a large underwater mammal in Loch Ness, not least the sonar soundings of 1972 which showed the presence of a 6-ft flipper." However, in a 1998 Sunday Times interview, Shuker suggested that the Loch Ness monster was losing traction, with more attention going toward large cat sightings, stating, "They're more tangible," and that "[a]ny scientist who these days decides to take the Loch Ness monster seriously knows that it will damage his reputation."

Reviewing Shuker's 2003 book The Beasts that Hide from Man, Mark Bayless described the work as "thought provoking and well researched," contrasting Shuker's work favorably against other cryptozoology texts as providing a "scholarly, reader-friendly format," and addressing a wider range of cryptids that are not covered in comparable sources.

A March 2013 review of the Journal of Cryptozoology in Brazilian journal Revista Piauí was generally positive regarding Shuker's efforts at a scientific approach to documenting cryptozoological findings, noting an article which put forth a giant oarfish as the most likely candidate to explain a recent sighting, but noted the professional challenges that cryptozoological researchers seeking to document findings may face, suggesting some are met with ridicule from colleagues due to a large portion of the cryptozoological community not being scientifically regarded.

== Awards and honours ==
In 2005, a new species of Loricifera was named Pliciloricus shukeri, after Shuker.

In November 2001, Karl Shuker won £250,000 on Who Wants to Be a Millionaire?.

== Books ==
- Mystery Cats of the World (1989), Robert Hale, ISBN 0-7090-3706-6
- Extraordinary Animals Worldwide (1991), Robert Hale, ISBN 0-7090-4421-6
- The Lost Ark: New and Rediscovered Animals of the 20th Century (1993), HarperCollins, ISBN 0-00-219943-2
- Dragons – A Natural History (1995), Simon & Schuster, ISBN 0-684-81443-9; republished (2006), Taschen
- In Search of Prehistoric Survivors (1995), Blandford, ISBN 0-7137-2469-2
- The Unexplained (1996), Carlton Books, ISBN 1-85868-186-3
- From Flying Toads To Snakes With Wings (1997), Llewellyn, ISBN 1-56718-673-4
- Mysteries of Planet Earth (1999), Carlton Books, ISBN 1-85868-679-2
- The Hidden Powers of Animals, (2001), Reader's Digest, ISBN 0-7621-0328-0
- The New Zoo: New and Rediscovered Animals of the Twentieth Century (2002), House of Stratus, ISBN 1-84232-561-2
- The Beasts That Hide From Man (2003), Paraview, ISBN 1-931044-64-3
- Extraordinary Animals Revisited (2007) CFZ Press, ISBN 1-905723-17-2
- Dr Shuker's Casebook (2008) CFZ Press, ISBN 1-905723-33-4
- Dinosaurs and Other Prehistoric Animals on Stamps: A Worldwide Catalogue (2008) CFZ Press, ISBN 1-905723-34-2
- Star Steeds and Other Dreams: The Collected Poems (2009) CFZ Press, ISBN 978-1-905723-40-9
- Karl Shuker's Alien Zoo: From the Pages of Fortean Times (2010) CFZ Press, ISBN 978-1-905723-62-1
- The Encyclopaedia of New and Rediscovered Animals (2012) Coachwhip Publications, ISBN 978-1-61646-108-9
- Cats of Magic, Mythology, and Mystery (2012) CFZ Press, ISBN 978-1-909488-03-8
- Mirabilis: A Carnival of Cryptozoology and Unnatural History (2013) Anomalist Books, ISBN 1-93839-805-X
- Dragons in Zoology, Cryptozoology, and Culture (2013) Coachwhip Publications, ISBN 1-61646-215-9
- The Menagerie of Marvels: A Third Compendium of Extraordinary Animals (2014) CFZ Press, ISBN 978-1-909488-20-5
- A Manifestation of Monsters: Examining the (Un)Usual Suspects (2015) Anomalist Books, ISBN 978-1-938398-52-0
- More Star Steeds and Other Dreams - The Collected Poems - 2015 Expanded Edition (2015) Fortean Words, ISBN 978-1-909488-38-0
- Here's Nessie! A Monstrous Compendium From Loch Ness (2016) CFZ Press, ISBN 978-1-909488-45-8
- Still in Search of Prehistoric Survivors: The Creatures That Time Forgot? (2016) Coachwhip Publications, ISBN 978-1-616463-90-8
