= Wadj =

Wadj can refer to:

- The Egyptian Pharaoh Djet.
- The Ancient Egyptian word for papyrus.
- An Ancient Egyptian hieroglyph, the papyrus stem.
- Wadj-wer, an ancient Egyptian god of fertility
- Wadj amulet, an Ancient Egyptian amulet in the shape of a papyrus stem
- WBHV (Somerset, Pennsylvania), a silent radio station (1330 AM) licensed to Somerset, Pennsylvania, United States, which held the call sign WADJ from 1980 to 1987
