= Jackal's horn =

Mythical cone-shaped growth on the skulls of golden jackals

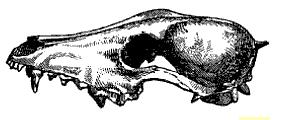
Skull of a Sri Lankan jackal with a horn

The Jackal's horn (Urdu: گیدڑ سنگھی) is a mythical boney cone-shaped excrescence which is said to occasionally grow on the skulls of golden jackals. It is associated with magical powers in South Asia. Despite the lack of proof for its existence it is still widely believed to be real. This horn supposedly usually measures half an inch in length, and is concealed by fur.

In the 1800s, the natives of Sri Lanka called this growth narric-comboo, and both Tamil and Sinhalese people traditionally believe it to be a potent amulet which can grant wishes and reappear to its owner at its own accord when lost. Some Sinhalese believe that the horn can grant the holder invulnerability in any lawsuit.

According to healers and witch doctors in Nepal, a jackal horn can be used to win in gambling bouts, and ward off evil spirits. The Tharu people of Bardia (Nepal) believe that jackal horns are retractible, and only protrude when jackals howl in chorus. A hunter who manages to extract the horn will place it in a silver casket of vermilion powder, which is thought to give the object sustenance. The Tharu believe that the horn can grant the owner the ability to see in the dark.

In some areas, the horn is called Seear Singhi or "Geedar Singhi" the word "Geedar" is the Urdu translation of Jackal and (the root words being the Persian "Seaah" meaning black, and "Singh" which means horn in Hindi and Urdu) and is tied to the necks of children. The horn is sometimes traded by low caste people, though it is thought that they are in fact pieces of deer antlers sold to the credulous.

In Bengal, it is believed that when placed within a safe, jackal horns can increase the amount of money within three-fold. Some criminal elements of the Bengal Sansi will use fake jackal horns to lull unwitting people into trusting them, and will offer to place these horns into their victim's safe in order to discover its location.
