= Lunula (amulet) =

Pendant worn by girls in ancient Rome

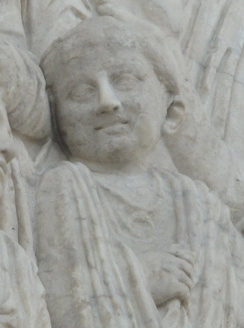
Detail from the Ara Pacis Augustae showing a Roman girl wearing a lunula.

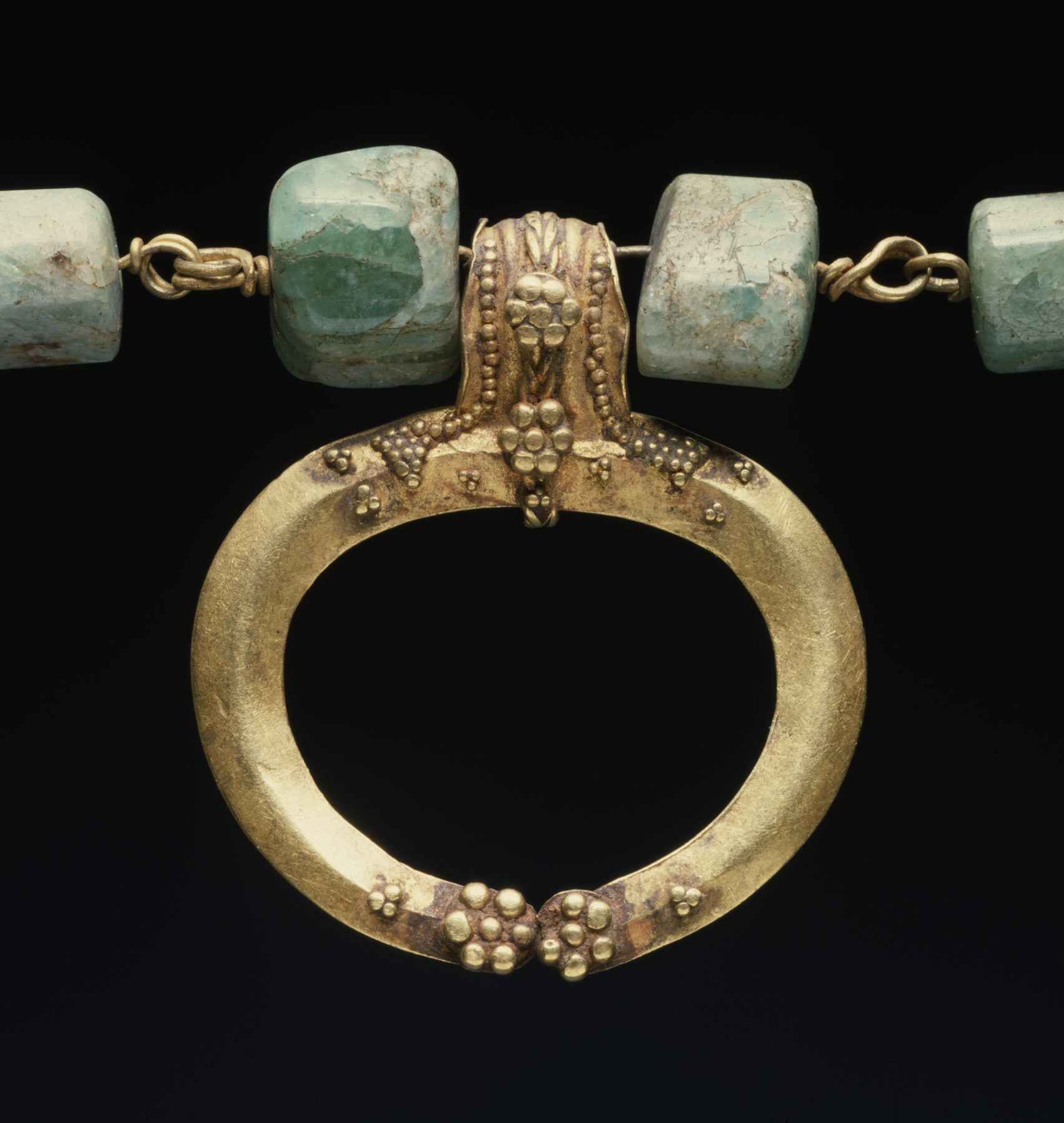
Necklace with gold "Lunula" and chain links of agate, decorated with filigree. Roman Imperial (1st century AD)

A lunula (pl. lunulae) was a crescent moon-shaped pendant worn by girls in ancient Rome. Girls typically wore them as an apotropaic amulet, the equivalent of the boy's bulla. Romans wore amulets usually as a talisman, to protect themselves against evil forces, demons, and sorcery, but especially against the evil eye. Isidore of Seville provided an explicit definition: "Lunulae are female ornaments in the likeness of the moon, little hanging gold bullae." Lunulae were common throughout the entire Mediterranean region, while their male counterpart, the bulla, was most popular in Italy. In Plautus' play, Epidicus asks the young girl Telestis: "Don't you remember my bringing you a gold lunula on your birthday, and a little gold ring for your finger?" But in Plautus' play Rudens, Palaestra says her father gave her a golden bulla on the day of her birth.
