= Stefanie Martin-Kilcher =

Roman archaeologist

Stefanie Martin-Kilcher (born 5 July 1945) is a Swiss archaeologist. She is Professor Emerita of Roman Provincial Archaeology at the University of Bern.

== Biography ==
Martin-Kilcher studied prehistory, early history, classical archaeology, and folk lore at the University of Basel. She received her doctorate from basel in 1973. Her thesis, on the Roman cemetery at Courroux was published as a 1976 monograph.

Between 1978 and 1991 she was the Editor of Archaeology of Switzerland magazine. She completed her habilitation at the University of Bern in January 1991, becoming Professor of Roman Provincial Archaeology.

A Festschrift was published in her honor in 2010 on the occasion of her 65th birthday.

== Select publications ==
- Martin-Kilcher, S. 2000. "Mors immatura in the Roman world – a mirror of society and tradition", in J. Peace and M. Millet (eds), Burials, Society and Context in the Roman World. Oxbow. 63–77.
- Martin-Kilcher, S. 2004. "Amphorae in the Roman West: Discussion and Research since 1989". In: J. Eiring/J. Lund (eds.) Transport Amphorae and Trade in the Eastern Mediterranean (International Colloquium Athens, 2002). Århus. 263–272.
- Martin-Kilcher, S. 2006. "Pratiques funéraires en Gaule du Ier au IIIe siècle". In: D. Paunier (ed.) La romanisation et la question de l’héritage celtique: Table ronde Lausanne 2005 (Coll. Bibracte 12/5). Glux-en-Glenne. 193–217.
- Martin-Kilcher, S. 2008. "Römische Gräber – Spiegel der Bestattungsund Grabsitten". In: J. Scheid (ed.) Pour une archéologie du rite. Nouvelles perspectives de l’archéologie funéraire (Coll. École Française Rome 407). Rome. 9-27.
