= Wadj amulet =

a Papyrus scepter

The Wadj amulet (also known as the papyrus column or scepter) is an Ancient Egyptian amulet in the shape of a papyrus stem. These amulets were made out of turquoise feldspar or Egyptian faience, as is indicated in the Book of the Dead.

Though usually taking the form of a papyrus stem, they are also known to also encompass rectangular plaques with depictions of papyrus on them. In Ancient Egyptian, the word wadj means "green," though it is also known to refer to health and to flourish in life.

Wadj amulets were a symbol of eternal youth, and were often placed upon a dead body around the neck upon burial to ensure eternal youth in the afterlife. The amulets have been dated to the Late Period of Egypt, specifically between the 26th and 30th dynasties (664–332 BC). Spells from the Book of the Dead state that if a wadj amulet is found intact, the wearer is healthy in the afterlife.

== Artifacts ==
Specific artifacts have been found around New Kingdom archaeological sites. One held at the Museum of Fine Arts, Boston was found at the Giza Plateau.
