= Papa Isio =

Philippine revolutionary (1846–1911)

Dionisio Magbuelas
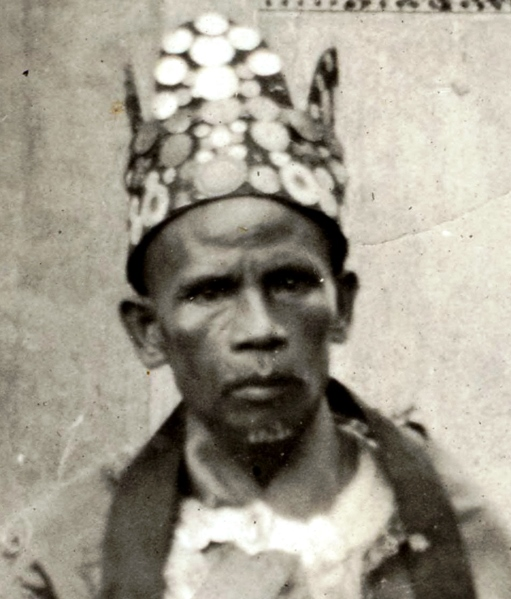
- Papa Isio at the Bacolod prison after his surrender to American authorities in 1907
- Born: 20 March 1846; Negros Occidental, Captaincy General of the Philippines
- Died: 1911 (aged 64–65); Manila, Philippine Islands
- Monuments: Papa Isio historical marker Isio, Cauayan, Negros Occidental
- Other names: Papa Isio
- Citizenship: Philippine
- Organization: Babaylanes
- Movement: Negros Revolution

Dionisio Magbuelas (20 March 1846 - 1911), Dionisio Seguela or Dionisio Papa y Barlucia, more widely known as Papa Isio (Hiligaynon, “Pope Isio”), was the leader of a group of babaylanes who were, as conjectured by Modesto P. Sa-onoy, recruited from the remnants of Dios Buhawi’s movement, which dissolved under the poor leadership of Camartin de la Cruz in the years before the outbreak of the Philippine Revolution.

== Early life ==
Magbuelas was the son of migrants from Panay to the west, either Antique or San Joaquín, Iloilo, who cleared a small piece of land in the forests of Himamaylan. In his younger years, Magbuelas witnessed the loss of their small landholding to the marauding “sugar barons” of Negros. His family then moved to Payao in Binalbagan. When his parents died, Magbuelas gathered coconut sap and made native coconut wine in order to make ends meet. He later reportedly worked for the family of a Carlos Gemora in Ilog. By 1880, he was 34 years old and was working as a cattle herder in the farm of the Montilla family in Tinungan. It was here that Magbuelas had a scuffle with a Spaniard whom he wounded. Fearing reprisal from the Spanish authorities and the Guardia Civil, Magbuelas fled to the mountains as Dios Buhawi was leading his revolt, and he may have joined this group.

== Revolution ==
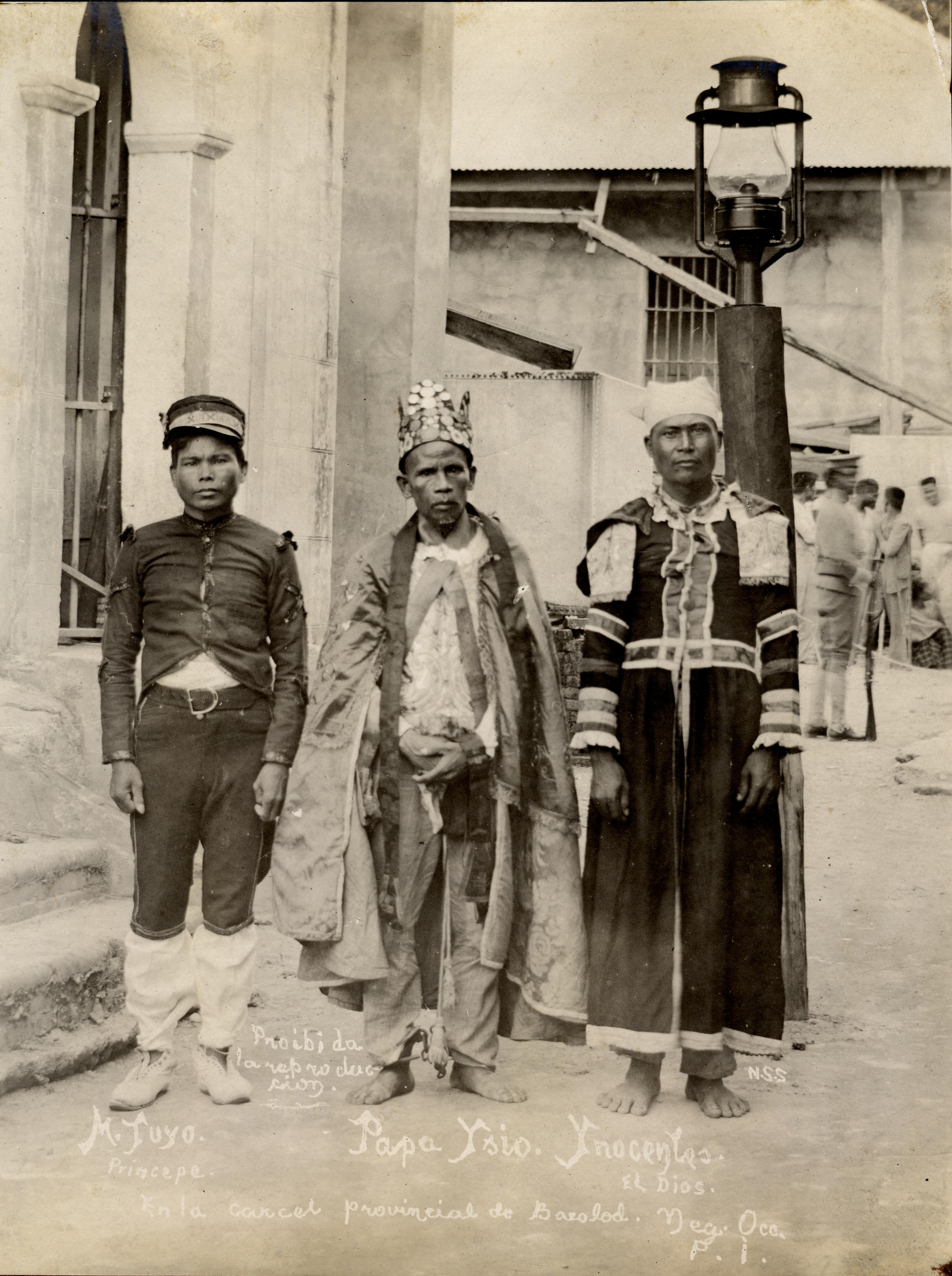
Papa Isio with two babaylanes followers in a prison in Bacolod after his surrender to American authorities in 1907

According to Sa-onoy, Magbuelas's nom de guerre “Papa Isio” was partly dictated by the religious thrust of his revolt against Spain and the Christianity it championed. His appropriation of the title "Papa" was to repudiate the authority of the Pope (Santo Papa). This particular group of babaylanes were organized by Magbuelas in 1896 in Himamaylan, Negros Occidental.

Fusing religion with agrarian reform and nationalism, Papa Isio called for the expulsion of foreigners from Negros and the division of the land among the natives. It is contended that Papa Isio responded to the Philippine Revolution which was begun in August 1896 by Andrés Bonifacio. The group of babaylanes was said to have adopted the battle cries "¡Viva Rizal!" (Spanish, "Long live Rizal!"), "¡Viva Filipinas libre!" (Spanish, "Long live a free Philippines!") and "Kamatayon sa Katsila" (Hiligaynon, "Death to Spaniards!").

While Filipino revolutionary General Miguel Malvar, widely acknowledged as the last leader of the Philippine Revolution to surrender to the Americans, had capitulated on April 16, 1902, Papa Isio gave up his own struggle very much later on August 6, 1907. Finally cornered by colonial forces, Papa Isio surrendered to American Lieutenant J. S. Mohler. At first, he was sentenced to death, which was commuted to life imprisonment. Papa Isio soon died in the Old Bilibid Prison in Manila in 1911.

== Commemoration ==
On November 6, 2009, the National Historical Institute unveiled a historical marker in honor of Magbuelas at the public plaza of Isabela, Negros Occidental. The marker states:

Papa Isio was known to be a leader in Negros and organized a group in Isabela fighting for freedom from the Spanish colonizers in 1896. He became the military chief of the municipality of La Castellana under the Cantonal Government of Negros in November 1898. He also fought the American colonizers in 1899-1907, surrendered on August 6, 1907, and died at the Manila Bilibid Prison in 1911.

== In popular media ==
- Filipino author Eric Gamalinda based his 2000 novel My Sad Republic, loosely on the person of Papa Isio.
- The Kanlaon Theater and Dance Company, the student theater and dance group of Colegio San Agustin-Bacolod, staged Papa Isio... Tingog Sang Kadam-an (Hiligaynon, "Papa Isio, Voice of the Masses"). The musical based on the life of Papa Isio was staged during the Second National Theater Festival, hosted by the Cultural Center of the Philippines in February 1996.
- Don Papa Rum, a Philippine rum distilled from sugarcane, is inspired by Papa Isio.

== See also ==
- Philippine Revolution
- Negros Island
- Negros Revolution
- Dios Buhawi
- Babaylan
