= Convent pornography =

Pornography within the catholic convent between nuns

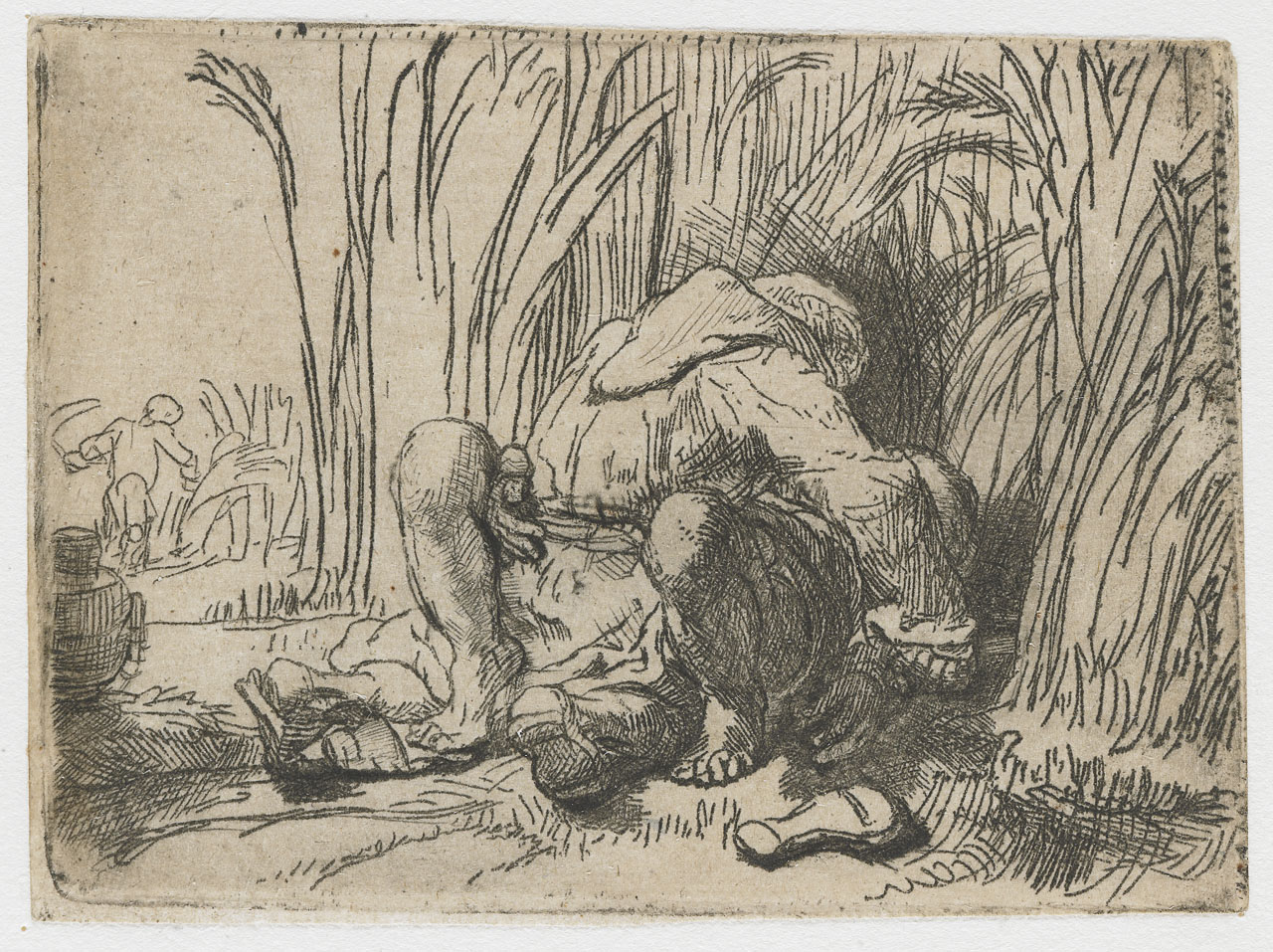
Rembrandt, The Monk in the Cornfield, c. 1646

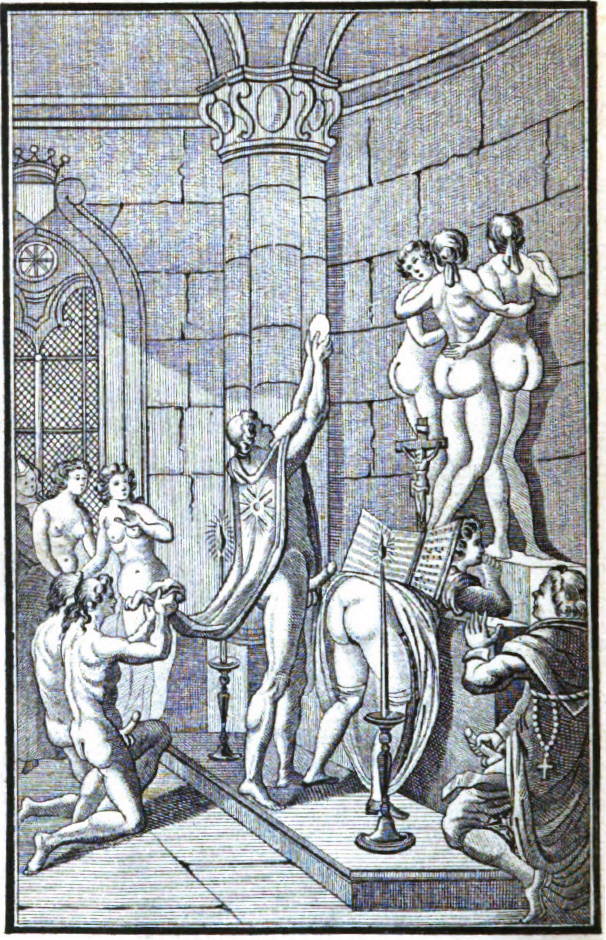
Unknown artist, illustration from the novel Justine, 1797

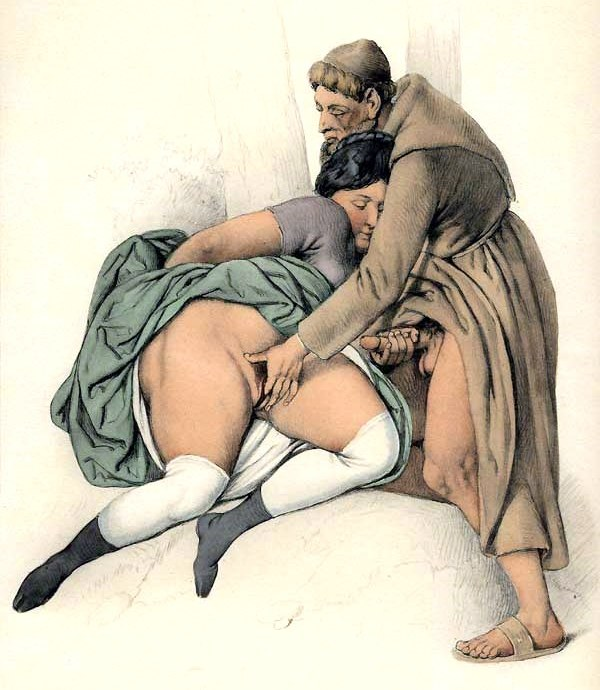
Peter Johann Nepomuk Geiger, watercolor, 1840

Convent pornography, convent erotica, friar erotica, priest erotica, monk erotica, or clergy erotica includes paintings, sculpture, photographs, dramatic arts, music and writings that show scenes of erotic or sexual nature involving clergy.

== In Europe ==
=== In France ===
During the Enlightenment, many of the French free-thinkers began to exploit pornography as a medium of social criticism and satire. Libertine pornography was a subversive social commentary and often targeted the Catholic Church and general attitudes of sexual repression. The market for the mass-produced, inexpensive pamphlets soon became the bourgeoisie, making the upper class worry, as in England, that the morals of the lower class and weak-minded would be corrupted since women, slaves and the uneducated were seen as especially vulnerable during that time. The stories and illustrations (sold in the galleries of the Palais Royal, along with the services of prostitutes) were often anti-clerical and full of misbehaving priests, monks and nuns, a tradition that in French pornography continued into the 20th century. In the period leading up to the French Revolution, pornography was also used as political commentary; Marie Antoinette was often targeted with fantasies involving orgies, lesbian activities and the paternity of her children, and rumours circulated about the supposed sexual inadequacies of Louis XVI. During and after the Revolution, the famous works of the Marquis de Sade were printed. They were often accompanied by illustrations and served as political commentary for their author.

== In Southeast Asia ==
=== In the Philippines ===
Filipino historian Ambeth R. Ocampo described that in the 19th-century Philippines the sexually attractive female body parts of the time were the "bare arms, a good neck or nape" and "tiny rosy feet". This is exemplified by Ocampo's chosen passages from Soledad Lacson-Locsin's unabridged English-language translation of the 25th chapter of José Rizal's Spanish-language novel, the Noli Me Tangere:

"At last, Maria Clara emerged from the bath accompanied by her friends, fresh as a rose opening its petals with the first dew, covered with sparks of fire from the early morning sun. Her first smile was for Crisostomo (Ibarra), and the first cloud on her brow for Padre Salvi..." (Padre Salvi, although a priest, is an admirer of Maria Clara.) "Their legs were up to the knees, the wide folds of their bathing skirts outlining the gracious curves of their thighs. Their hair hung loose and their arms were bare. They wore striped gay-colored blouses... Pale and motionless, the religious Actaeon (i.e. Padre Salvi, who was hiding in the bushes, acting as a voyeur) watched this chaste Diana (i.e. Maria Clara): his sunken eyes glistening at the sight of her beautifully molded white arms, the graceful neck ending in a suggestion of a bosom. The diminutive rosy feet playing in the water aroused strange sensations and feelings in his impoverished, starved being and made him dream of new visions in his fevered mind."

In My Sad Republic, Eric Gamalinda incorporated the genre of erotica such as what Angela Stuart-Santiago described as a "dash of friar erotica" (also known as "priest erotica") witnessed during the diminishing decades of the rule of the Spanish friars in the Philippines. Gamalinda described the love scene between a Spanish parish priest nicknamed Padre Batchoy and a native lass as if the friar was inserting a sacred host into the lips of a native girl's sex organ. There was another love scene – during a secret rendezvous between the novel's hero Magbuela and his beloved De Urquiza – wherein (according to Stuart-Santiago) De Urquiza did a "strange thing", lifting her a head a little to give Magbuela a prolonged bite on the hard and firm muscle located above Magbuela's collarbone, as if De Urquiza wanted to remain forever connected to Magbuela's body.

== See also ==
- Erotic literature
- History of erotic depictions
- Erotic film
- Nunsploitation
