= Dios Buhawi =

Ponciano Elofre
- Born: Negros Oriental, Captaincy General of the Philippines
- Died: 22 August 1887; Siaton, Negros Oriental, Captaincy General of the Philippines
- Other name: Dios Buhawi
- Citizenship: Philippines
- Organization: babaylanes

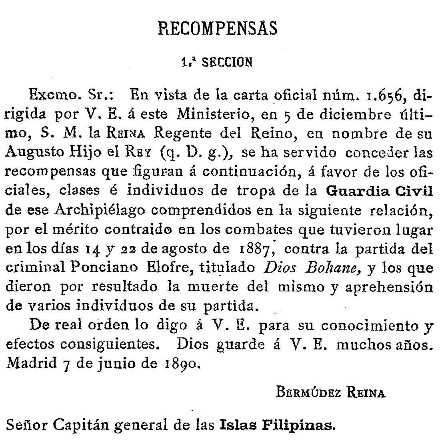
A section in the Diario Oficial del Ministerio de la Guerra (1890) discussing rewards to the Guardia Civil responsible for the death of Elofre, here referred to as Dios Bohane (sic)

Ponciano Elofre (sometimes spelled Ponciano Elopre), later called Dios Buhawi (Hiligaynon for "Tornado/Whirlwind God"), was a cabeza (head) of a barangay in Zamboanguita in Negros Oriental, Philippines, and the leader of a politico-religious revolt on Negros in the late 19th century against the Spaniards.

== Revolutionary activities ==
Elofre began his revolt when, as cabeza de barangay, he failed to collect all the taxes from his constituents. Spanish soldiers beat his father, Cris Elofre, to death in order to teach him a lesson. Thereafter, he rallied the people against the forced payment of taxes. Later, he included religious freedom as part of his agenda, and directed the celebration of the ancient rites of the babaylan (ancient Visayan shaman), a revival of the religious leader of the pre-Spanish era. He and his followers were later called the babaylanes, which numbered about 2,000. Elofre reputedly dressed in female clothing and was said to be effeminate in the same manner as ancient asog shamans.

== Death ==
The activities of Elofre so alarmed the Spanish colonial government that Governor-General Valeriano Weyler sent 500 men of the Guardia Civil and a battleship to Negros to deal with the threat. On August 22, 1887, Elofre raided Siaton, the town adjoining Zamboanguita, and was killed in the encounter with colonial forces. His wife, Flaviana Tubigan, continued the revolt, but lacked her husband's charm and charisma. She was succeeded by Ka Martin de la Cruz, of Tolong in southern Negros Oriental, Elofre's lieutenant, but his command of the babaylanes degenerated into banditry. When the Spanish authorities failed in their bid to capture him, on September 11, 1893, de la Cruz was killed in a trap laid by his own mistress, Alfonsa Alaidan.

The remaining Buhawi followers, conjectures Modesto P. Sa-onoy, were later recruited by Papa Isio when he began to organize his own group of babaylanes in another revolt against Spain.

== See also ==
- Babaylan
- Negros Oriental
- Negros Revolution
- Papa Isio
- Philippine Revolution
- Pulahan
