= Gamalinda =

Gamalinda is a surname. Notable people with the surname include:

- Eric Gamalinda (born 1956), Filipino author
- Riego Gamalinda (born 1986), Filipino basketball player
