= Filipino shamans =

Shamans of ethnic groups in the Philippines

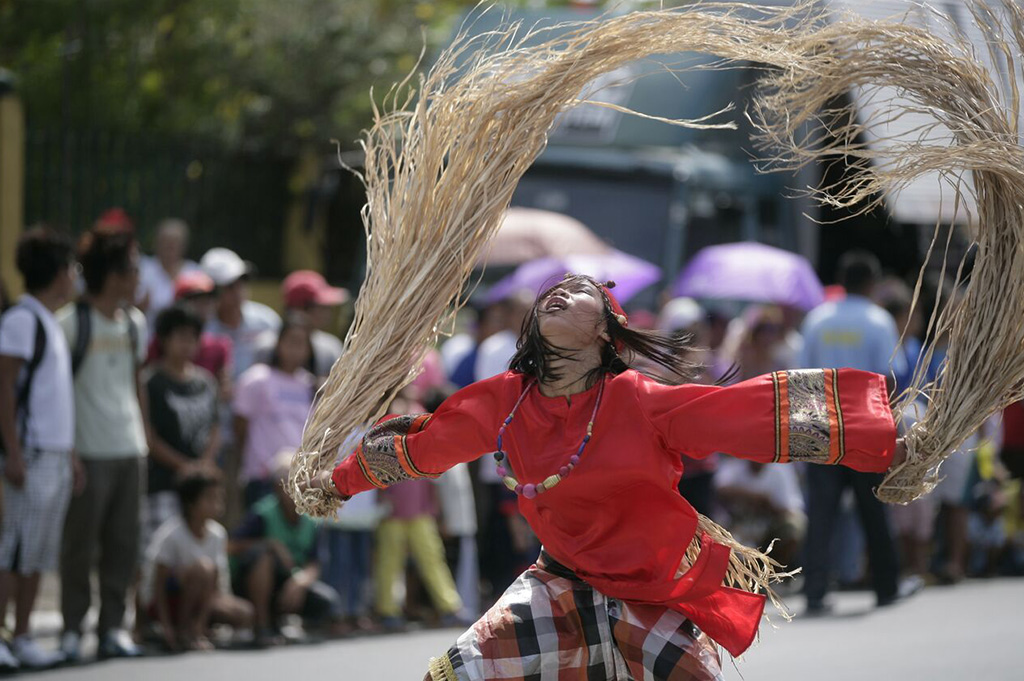
A performer depicting a shaman in a recent Babaylan Festival of Bago, Negros Occidental

Filipino shamans, commonly known as the babaylan (also balian or katalonan, among many other names), were shamans of the various ethnic groups of the pre-colonial Philippines. These shamans specialized in communicating, appeasing, or harnessing the spirits of the dead and the spirits of nature. Babaylan were predominantly women serving in spiritual leadership roles. Effeminate men (asog or bayok) could also be shamans and adopted dress and roles commonly associated with women within indigenous spiritual practice, although they were usually less common than female shamans. Shamans were believed to have spirit guides through which they could contact and interact with the spirits and deities (anito or diwata) and the spirit world. Their primary role was as mediums during pag-anito séance rituals. There were also various subtypes of babaylan specializing in the arts of healing and herbalism, divination, and sorcery.

== Terminology ==
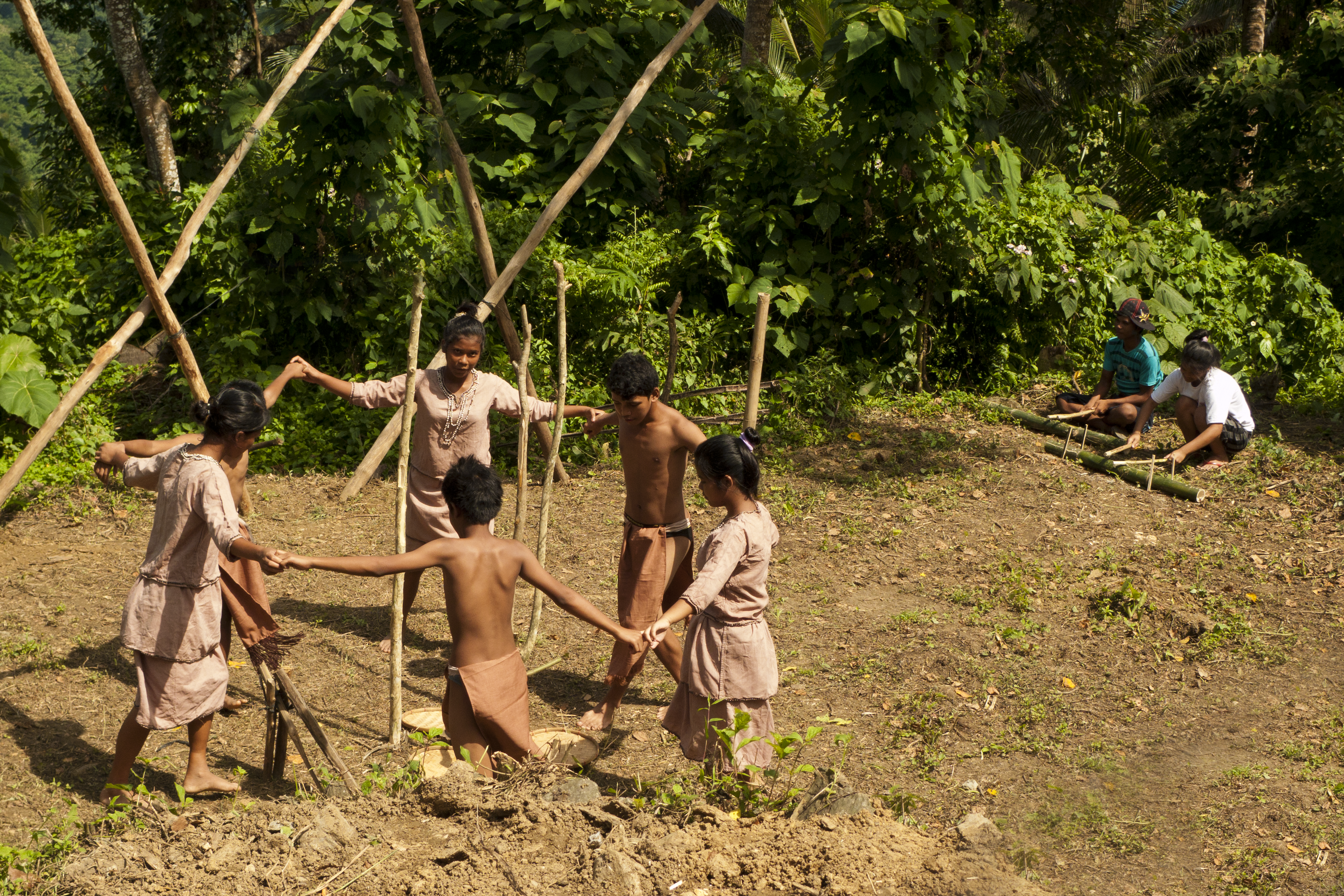
A ritual of the Iraya Mangyan to prepare land for kaingin (swidden farming)

The most common native terms for shamans among Austronesian groups in Island Southeast Asia are balian, baylan, or cognates and spelling variants thereof. They are all derived from Proto-Western-Malayo-Polynesian *balian, meaning "shaman" (probably originally female, transvestite, or hermaphroditic) or "medium". Various cognates in other non-Filipino Austronesian languages include babalian, bobolian, and bobohizan (Kadazan-Dusun); wadian (Ma'anyan); belian (Iban); belian (Malay); walen or walyan (Old Javanese); balian (Balinese); bolian (Mongondow); balia (Uma); wulia or balia (Bare'e); balia (Wolio); balian (Ngaju); and balieng (Makassar). However *balian-derived terms have largely disappeared among lowland Filipinos after Christianization in the Spanish era. Some exceptions exist, such as Bikol, where it persisted and acquired the Spanish feminine suffix -a to become balyana. It also survives among some Muslim Filipinos, such as walian in Maranao, although the meaning has shifted after Islamization.

The linguist Otto Dempwolff has also theorized that *balian may have ultimately derived from Proto-Austronesian *bali ("escort", "accompany") with the suffix *-an, meaning "one who escorts a soul to the other world" (a psychopomp). However, the linguists Robert Blust and Stephen Trussel have noted that there is no evidence that *balian is a suffixed form, and thus believe that Dempwolff's interpretation is incorrect.

More general terms used by Spanish sources for native shamans throughout the archipelago were derived from Tagalog and Visayan anito ("spirit"), such as maganito and anitera. However, different ethnic groups had different names for shamans, including shamans with specialized roles. These include:

- Abaknon: tambalan
- Aeta/Agta: anitu, puyang (also poyang, pawang, pauang), huhak (diviner)
- Bagobo: mabalian
- Balanguingui: duwarta
- Banwaon: babaiyon (also the female datu of the tribe)
- Bikol: balyán, balyán-a, balyana, paraanito, paradiwata
- Bukidnon: baylan
- Gaddang: mailang
- Hanunó'o: balyán, balyán-an
- Higaonon: baylan
- Hiligaynon: maaram
- Ibaloi: mambunong
- Ifugao: mandadawak, dawak, insupak, mon-lapu, tumunoh, alpogan, mumbaki, manalisig (apprentice)
- Ilocano: baglan, mangoodan, manilao, mangalag (medium), mangngagas (herbalist)
- Isneg: alopogan, dorarakit, anitowan
- Itneg: mandadawak, alpogan
- Ivatan: machanitu (medium), maymay (midwife), mamalak (diviner)
- Kankana-ey: manbunong (medium), mansib-ok (healer), mankotom (diviner, also mankutom)
- Kapampangan: katulunan (also catulunan)
- Karay-a: ma-aram, mangindaloan (healer), soliran (diviner, also soli-an)
- Lumad: balian, balyan, mabalian
- Maguindanao: walian (female shaman, midwife), pendarpa'an (medium), pedtompan (medium), tabib (healer), pangagamot ([apprentice] healer, also ebpamanggamut), ebpamangalamat (diviner)
- Mamanwa: baylan, binulusan, sarok, tambajon (healer, also tambalon)
- Mandaya: baylan, balyan, baliyan
- Manobo: beylan, baylanen (also baylanon), manhuhusay (mediator, keeper of traditions, also tausay), manukasey (healer against sorcery), walian or walyan, diwata (head shaman)
- Maranao: walian, pamomolong
- Palaw'an: belian
- Sama-Bajau: balyan, wali jinn, dukun, papagan, pawang, bomoh, kalamat (diviner), panday (healer, midwife)
- Sarangani: magbulungay
- Subanen: balian, tanguiling
- Suludnon: banawangon
- Tagalog: katalonan (also katalona, catalona, catalonan), manganito, sonat, anitera (or anitero), lubus (herbalist), manggagamot (healer), manghuhula or pangatahoan (diviner), hilot (midwife)
- Talaandig: walian
- Tausug: mangubat (also mangungubat, magubat), pagalamat (diviner)
- Tagbanwa: bawalyan, babaylan
- T'boli: tao d'mangaw, tao mulung (healer), m'tonbu (healer)
- Visayan: babaylan (also babailán, babailana), baylan (also balyan, balian, baliana, vaylan), daetan (also daytan, daitan), katooran (also catooran), mamumuhat, makinaadmanon, diwatera (or diwatero), anitera (or anitero), mananambal (healer), himagan (healer), siruhano (herbalist), manghuhula or manghihila (diviner), mananabang (midwife)
- Yakan: bahasa

According to Jaime Veneracion, Katalonan incorporates the root *talon which, in ancient Tagalog, meant "forest" (cf. Hiligaynon, Masbatenyo, Inabaknon, Capisano, Palawano, Buhid, and Agutaynen talon, "forest" or "thicket"). Other scholars believe that the origin of the word catalonan is the root word "*talo" which, according to them, is a Tagalog word originally meaning "to converse"; thus the word catalonan literally means someone who converse or communicate with the spirits (anito). According to Blumentritt, an old Tagalog word "tarotaro" is a term describing the catalonas while possessed by the spirits (anito). In some Malayo-Polynesian languages, such as Tahitian, "tarotaro" means "to pray" , while in Rapanui it means "a malediction or curse" . In Samoan, "talo" or "talotalo" means "a prayer" or "to pray". Linguist Malcolm Mintz, however, offers a different etymology. He suggests that the Tagalog root word is "*tulong" which means "to help". Some writers, such as William Henry Scott and Luciano P. R. Santiago ,favoured Mintz's suggestion and used the term catalonan (which is actually a Pampangan term) to refer to the priests and priestesses of the Tagalogs, instead of catalona or catalonan.

== Initiation ==
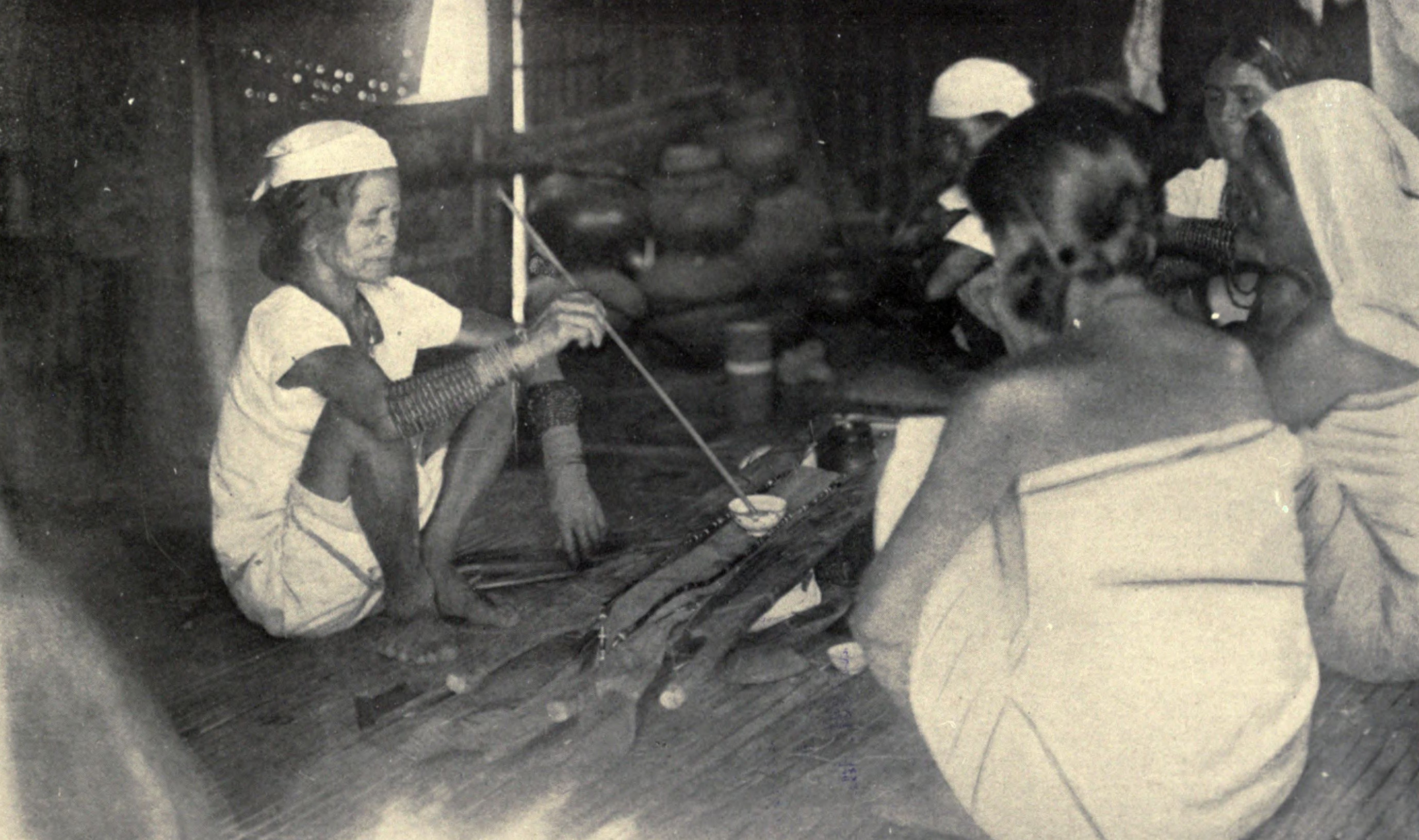
1922: a shaman of the Itneg people renewing an offering to the spirit (anito) of a warrior's shield (kalasag)

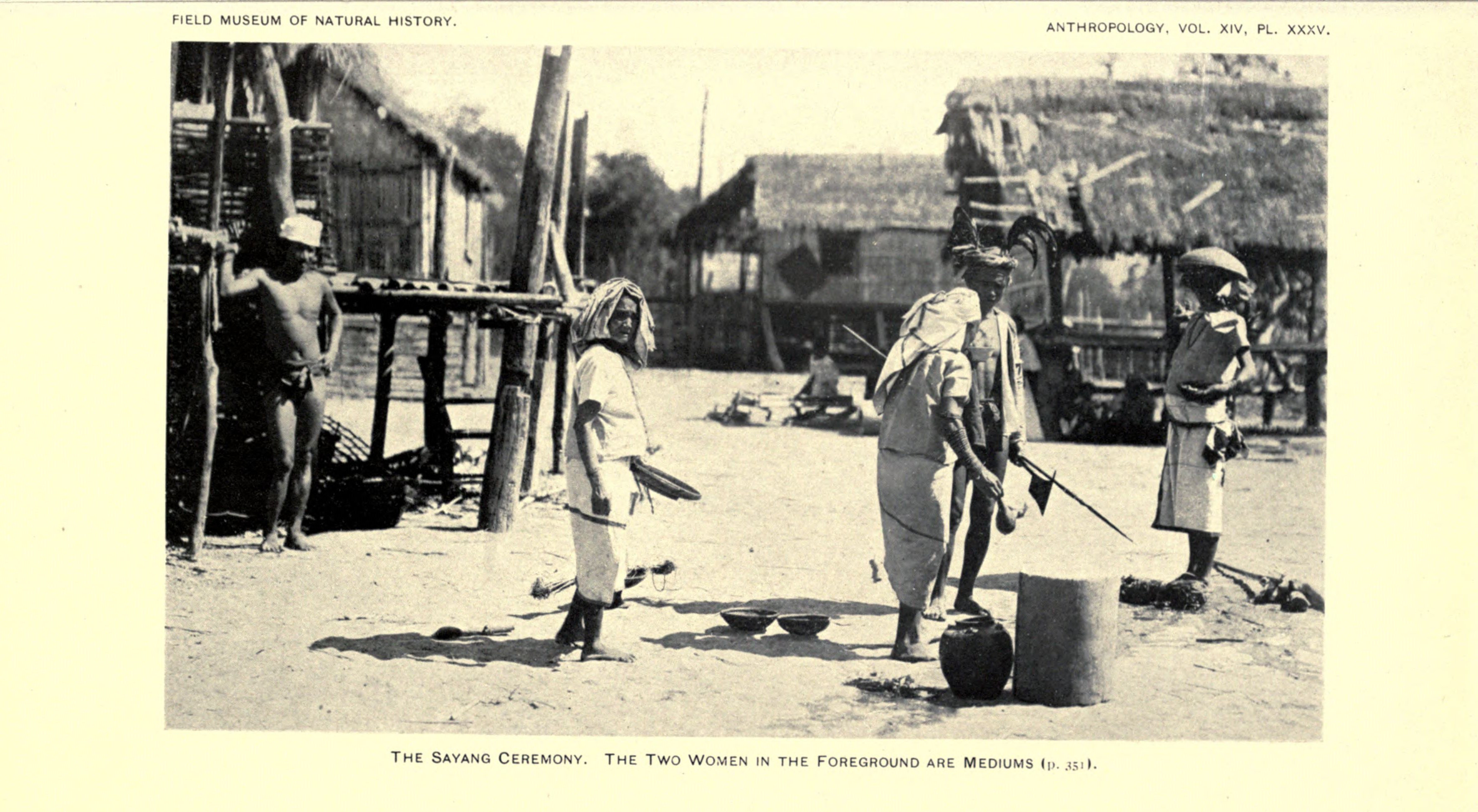
Itneg shamans (the two women in the foreground) conducting a sayang ritual (c. 1922)

Most babaylan inherit their status from an older babaylan they are apprenticed to, usually a relative. In some cultures, such as the Isneg people, older shamans can choose apprentices from among the eligible young women of the village.

A few, however, become babaylan after experiencing what has been termed a "shamanistic initiatory crisis" (also "shamanic illness" or "shamanic madness"). This includes serious or chronic illnesses, near-death experiences, sudden seizures and trembling, depression, strange events or behavior (including climbing balete trees or disappearing for several days with no memory of the events), bouts of insanity (including those induced by psychological trauma from a past event), and strange visions or dreams. These are regarded as encounters with the spirits, where the soul of the person is said to be journeying to the spirit world. In cases like this, it is said that a spirit chooses the person, rather than the other way around.

After being chosen, shamans go through an initiation rite. These rites are meant to gain or transfer the patronage of a spirit. Among Visayans, this ritual is known as the tupad or tupadan. In cases of people with "shamanic illness", these initiation rites are regarded as the cure, where the initiate regains health or sanity by conceding to the wishes of the spirits and "answering the call". When volunteered rather than volunteering, their relatives are usually required to pay a large fee to the senior shaman for the training. Initiation rites can range from simply inducing a trance through herbs or alcohol, to inducing personal crises through physical or psychological hardship. Extreme examples of initiation rites include getting buried alive or being immersed in water overnight.

After initiation, the apprentices are then trained in the details of their role. This training includes learning about rituals, chants and songs, the sacrifices appropriate for each spirit, oral histories, herbs, healing practices, and magic spells, among other things. They usually assist the senior shaman during ceremonies until their training is complete, which can take months to years. Each shaman can have one or more such apprentices, at varying ranks or specializations.

=== Spirit guides ===
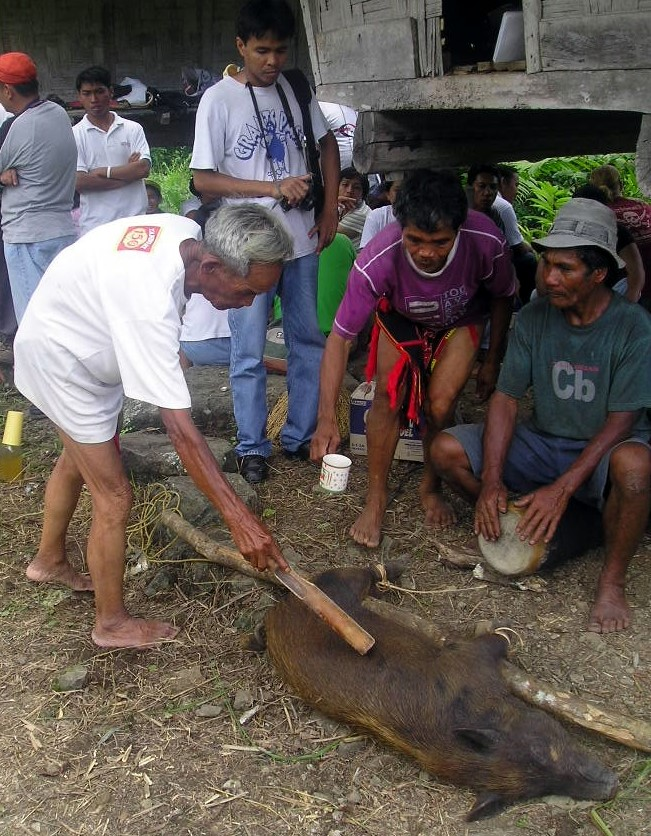
An Ifugao mumbaki overseeing the ritual sacrifice of a pig during the dipdipo ritual

The shaman's power to communicate with the spirit world is derived from their spirit companions that guide them and intercede for them. These spirits are usually referred to in euphemistic terms like abyan (friend), alagad or bantay (guardian), or gabay (guide), among other terms. Shamans have at least one abyan, with more powerful shamans having many. Certain individuals, like powerful leaders or warriors (especially those with shaman relatives), are also believed to have their own abyan that give them magical powers. Abyan are also believed to guide, teach, and inspire skilled artists and craftsmen in the community.

Abyan spirits can be ancestor spirits, but they are more commonly non-human spirits. Shamans either have spirit companions from birth, draw their attention during the "shamanic illness", or gain their allegiance during initiation into shamanism. Spirits are believed to be social beings, with individual quirks and personalities (both good and bad). The friendship of abyan depend on reciprocity. The shamans do not command them. People with abyan must regularly offer sacrifices to these spirits, usually consisting of food, alcoholic drinks, ngangà, and blood from a sacrificial animal (usually a chicken or a pig) (Note: These sacrifices vary depending on the type of spirit being interacted with (Buenconsejo, 2002)) in order to maintain good relations. This friendship of abyan, once earned, is enduring. They become, in essence, part of the family. The abyan of a deceased shaman will often "return" to a living relative who might choose to become a shaman as well.

The abyan are essential in shamanistic rituals, as they prevent the shaman's soul from getting lost in the spirit world. They also communicate entreaties on behalf of the shaman to more powerful spirits or deities, and fight evil spirits during healing or exorcism rituals.

=== Sex and gender ===
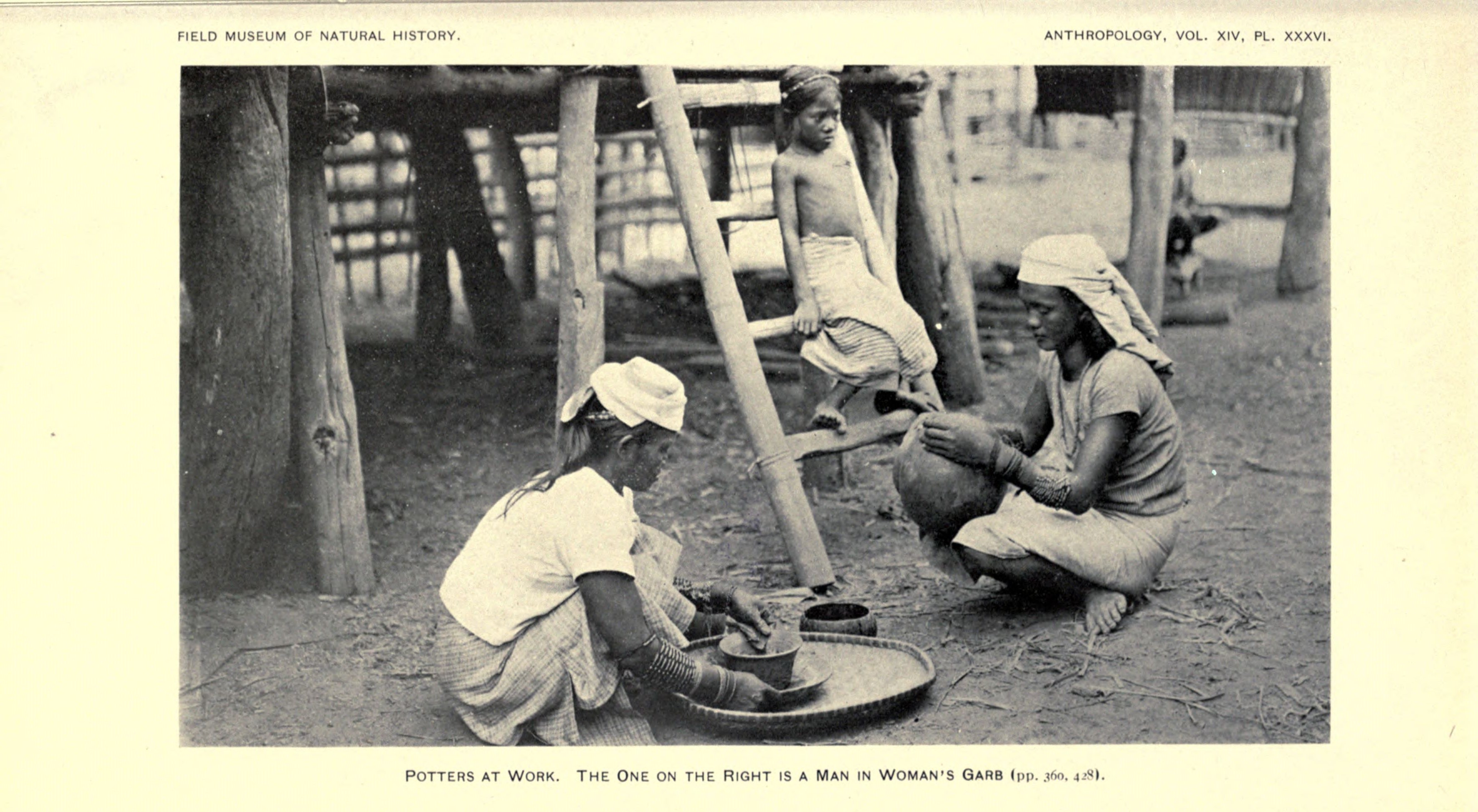
Itneg potters, the person on the right is a bayok in female attire (c. 1922)

In most Philippine ethnic groups, shamans were predominantly female, due to the role of the shaman (especially the medium) being an intrinsically feminine one. Among the minority of male shamans, most belonged to a distinct class—known as asog in the Visayas and bayok or bayog in Luzon—who adopted the voice, mannerisms, hairstyle, and dress typically associated with women. (Note: Asog is from Proto-Western-Malayo-Polynesian *asug, "shaman in ritual transvestite attire"; and Proto-Central Philippine *ásug, "sterile" or "asexual". Asog is the term used for transvestite male shamans in most of the Visayas and in the Bicol Region. Other Visayan terms include bantot, bayog, binabaye, and babayenon. In the rest of Luzon, they are known as bayok (bayoc), bayog, bayogin (bayoguin or bayoquin), binabae, or bido. Notably among the Sambal, the highest-ranking shaman was a bayok. They are also known as labia among the Subanen, though they were not necessarily shamans (Garcia, 2008; Kroeber, 1918).) These individuals were treated socially in ways similar to women, and their status allowed them access to spiritual and religious professions.

In Historia de las islas e indios de Bisayas (1668), the Spanish historian and missionary Francisco Ignacio Alcina records that the asog became shamans by virtue of being themselves. Unlike female shamans, they did not need to be chosen or undergo initiation rites. However, not all asog trained to become shamans. Castano states that the people of Bicol would hold a thanksgiving ritual called atang that was "presided" by an "effeminate" priest called an asog. His female counterpart, called a baliana, assisted him and led the women in singing what was called the soraki, in honor of Gugurang.

Historical accounts suggest that, during the precolonial period in the Philippines, female shamans predominated in the religious realm. (Note: From paragraph 26 (Brewer 1999): This prevalence of the male in matters spiritual was not replicated in the Philippine case, where it was the female shamans who predominated in the religious realm.) The Bolinao Manuscript (1685), for example, records that, during an Inquisitional investigation of the shamans in the town of Bolinao, Pangasinan between 1679 and 1685, animistic paraphernalia were confiscated from 148 people. Of those, 145 were female shamans, and the remaining three were transvestite male shamans, thus highlighting the statistical imbalance between the female-to-male ratio of indigenous shamans. The anonymously written "Manila Manuscript" also emphasized the auxiliary role of gender non-conforming male shamans in relation to the female shamans. This evidence, together with the fact that there were no written accounts of female sex/male gender identification amongst the women who exercised authority within the spiritual sphere, prove that spiritual potency was not dependent upon identification with a neuter "third" sex/gender space, but rather on identification with the feminine – whether one's biological sex was female or male. Femininity was considered the vehicle to the spirit world during the pre-colonial era, and the male shaman's identification with the feminine reinforced the normative situation of female as shaman. While Brewer agreed that it is naïve to dismiss the existence of a principal male shaman during the precolonial era, she also argued that such cases were unusual rather than the norm, and that the statistical imbalance in favour of principal male shamans occurred as a result of the influence of the male-centered Hispano-Catholic culture, such that in the late nineteenth century and in the early years of the twentieth century, in some areas like Negros, all the babaylan were male. (Note: For the previous statement regarding the Bolinao Manuscript, see paragraph 29. For the previous statement related to the Manila manuscript, see paragraph 31. For Brewer's comment regarding the spiritual potency of the shaman depending on identification with femininity and not on the identification with the neuter or third sex/gender, see paragraph 34.) Lachica has also hypothesized that the disappearance of female babaylan during the late Spanish colonial period was probably the influence of the male-led Catholic church that "ousted" the female babaylan, since people were looking for parallels to the male clergy.

Babaylan can freely marry and have children, including male asog who were recorded by early Spanish colonists as being married to men. (Note: Early colonial accounts point out that same-sex sexual relations were common for precolonial Filipinos of both sexes, not only the asog. In general, there was a great degree of sexual freedom in precolonial Filipino societies. Virginity was not valued, adultery was not perceived negatively, and there was wide use of genital piercings (tugbuk and sakra). (Brewer, 1999)) In some ethnic groups, marriage was a prerequisite for gaining full shaman status.

While many historical male shamans in the Visayas were asog (transvestites or feminized males), the Sukdan of Bohol represent a strictly masculine, patrilineal shamanic lineage. A Sukdan must be a married male; his wife plays a vital role as a ritual assistant. Their rituals often involve "martial" elements, such as the use of the sundang (wavy-edged machete) in trance dances to ward off rival sorcerers or malevolent spirits.

After the Spanish conquest of the Philippines, the practice of shamanism became clandestine due to persecution by the Catholic clergy. During this period, male shamans (particularly those specialized in the non-religious arts of herbalism and healing) became predominant. Female shamans became less common, while asog (shaman or otherwise) were punished harshly and driven to hiding. The change in women's status and the ostracization of the asog, however, did not immediately change the originally feminine role of the shamans. Male shamans in the late 17th century still dressed as women during rituals, even though they did not do so in their day-to-day activities. Unlike the ancient asog, they did not have sexual relations with other men and were usually married to women.

== Roles ==
=== Spirit mediums ===
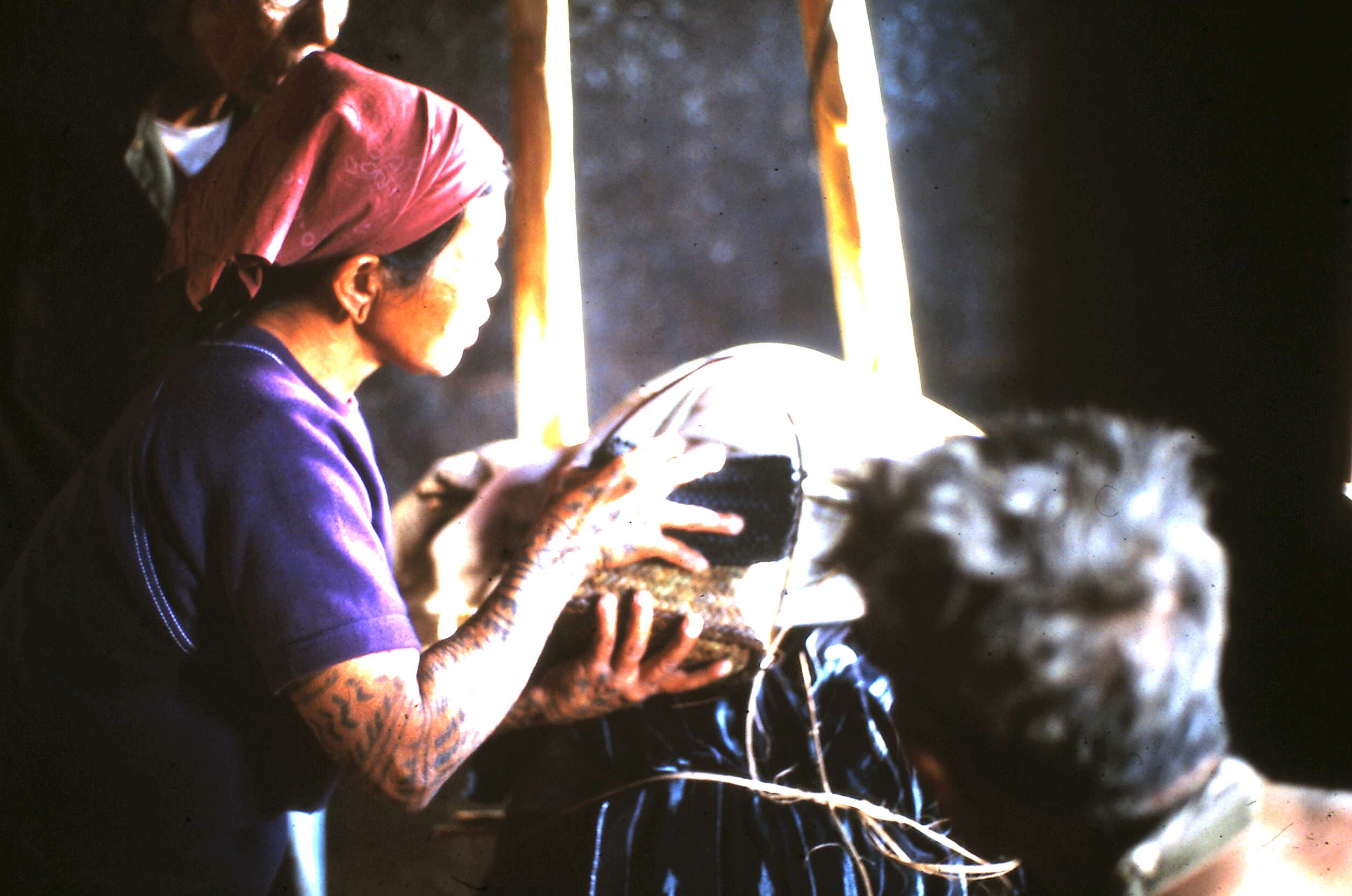
A Bontoc shaman performing a sacred wake ritual with a death chair

The primary role of shamans were as spirit mediums. They were intermediaries between the physical world and the spirit world, due to their ability to influence and interact with the spirits (anito), both malevolent and benevolent.

There are two general types of spirits usually interacted with in séance rituals. The first are the environmental or nature spirits "bound" to a particular location or natural phenomenon (similar to genii loci). They "own" places and concepts like agricultural fields, forests, cliffs, seas, winds, lightning, or realms in the spirit world. Some are also "keepers" or totems of various animals and plants. They have inhuman and abstract qualities, reflecting their particular dominions. They do not normally appear in human form and are usually gender-less or androgynous. They rarely concern themselves with human affairs. Rituals involving these spirits are almost always conducted outdoors.

The second type of spirits are the "unbound" spirits that have an independent existence. They appear as animals (usually as birds) or in human-like forms, (Note: Spirits in human form are believed to be distinguishable from humans because they do not have a philtrum. (Buenconsejo, 2002)) have gender differentiation, and have personal names. (Note: Names of spirits are generally not spoken aloud outside of a shamanic ritual, as it is believed that it may provoke them. They are instead referred to in euphemistic terms like "dili ingon nato" or "hindi kagaya natin", literally meaning "those unlike us". (Buenconsejo, 2002; Tan, 2008)) They are most similar to the elves and fairies of European folklore. (Note: With strong parallels to human-like beings like elves and aos sí, as well as diminutive human-like beings like brownies and pixies. (Buenconsejo, 2002)) These are the most common types of spirits to become abyan, as they are the most "sociable" and can take interest in human activities. These spirits are usually referred to as engkanto (from Spanish: encanto) in modern Filipino folklore. Unlike the "bound" spirits, these spirits can be invited into human households, and their rituals can take place both outdoors and indoors.

These categories are not static, however. A bound spirit can become unbound, and vice versa. Some shamans have spirit guides which are originally nature spirits that have become unbound.

Not all shamanic rituals result in spirit possession. Unbound spirits always possess shamans during rituals, either voluntarily or involuntarily. In contrast, bound spirits, as a rule, do not possess shamans. Instead, they are simply spoken to by the shaman. Bound spirits that inadvertently "stick" to humans are considered dangerous, and are the causes of spiritual illnesses, including confusion, strange food cravings, lust, and unreasoning anger. Sometimes in order to speak to certain bound spirits, the shaman may need the intercession of their abyan, who in turn will possess the shaman. Bound spirits can also be interacted with by non-shamans, like when offering sacrifices to the spirit of the forest before a hunt.

The Katalonas performed public ceremonies for community prosperity, fertility, or seasonable weather as well as private services to diagnose and cure ailments. They were respected for these functions but they were also feared sorcerers able to work black magic. Their numbers were large enough to put them in competition with one another. Individual success was attributed to the power of the deities with whom they identified, and who took possession of them in their frenzied dancing. The Tagalog word "olak", according to Ferdinand Blumentritt, is a term for the trembling of the whole body of the catalona, when she becomes possessed by the devil (anito). As spirit mediums, they conducted séances during which they spoke with the voice of spirits (anito), assisted by an "alagar" ("alagad", meaning personal attendant) to carry on the dialogue with the supernatural, or sent their own kaluluwa (soul) to seek lost souls. In this state of trance, the catalona was called "tarotaro" (voices), for it was believed that the ancestral spirits had entered her body and were speaking from inside her. According to Blumentritt, "tarotaro" is a Tagalog term describing the katalonas while possessed by the spirits, in this state, they cried "tarotaro". When a catalona held the gift of prophecy, she was named masidhi (the fervent one).

=== Healing ===
Healing was the most important role for shamans in their communities. Natural illnesses do not require a shaman for healing, while spiritual illnesses do.

Like in other Austronesian cultures, animistic Filipinos believed in the concept of soul dualism (sometimes referred to as "twin souls" or "double souls"). A person is believed to be composed of at least two souls—the breath of life (ginhawa or hininga, which stays with the living body) and the astral soul (the kalag or kaluluwa, which can travel to the spirit world). (Note: Other names for the astral soul include kaluha, dungan (Visayan); kalag (Bicol); linnawa (Igorot), kaduwa (Isneg), ab-abiik (Kankanaey), karurua (Ilocano), ikaruruwa (Ibanag), karaduwa (Mangyan), kiyaraluwa (Tagbanwa), makatu (Bukidnon), and kadengan-dengan or gimokud (Manobo). (Scott, 1994; Tan, 2008; Mercado, 1991) Most of the terms for the astral soul literally translate to "twin" or "double", from PAN *duSa, "two". (Yu, 2000; Blust, 2010)) The ginhawa is believed to reside in the pit of the stomach (usually the liver), while the kalag resides in the head. The ginhawa represents the person's body and bodily urges; while the kalag represents the person's identity, mind, and strength of will. Both are required in a living person.

Natural illnesses are the result of damage to the ginhawa. While they do not require a shaman, they are still important, as the death of the ginhawa will also mean the death of the body. These can be treated by skilled shamans, but were more often relegated to apprentices or assistants specializing in healing or herbalism.

Spiritual illnesses, on the other hand, are believed to be caused by the separation of the kalag from the ginhawa (referred to as "soul loss" in anthropological literature). This separation happens normally during sleep, where the kalag detaches to travel through the spirit world, resulting in dreams. However, when this separation happens when the person is awake, it results in spiritual illnesses. The causes of the separation can include the kalag getting lost in the spirit world; the kalag being captured, attacked, or seduced by another spirit; or simply the refusal of the kalag to return to the ginhawa. While it is not immediately lethal, the loss of the kalag can result in the loss of the person's mind and identity—thus insanity. Spiritual illnesses also include delirium, depression, trauma, fainting spells, and other mental illnesses. Evil or undesirable behavior may also be blamed on disharmony between the kalag and the ginhawa.

Shamans may also perform rituals to heal and strengthen the kalag of a person. These include the ritual of batak dungan or batakan among Visayan shamans. It strengthens and empowers the kalag of a person to prepare them for challenges, problems and obstacles. This ritual also protects the person from possible spiritual attack caused by malevolent spirits and sorcery.

==== Traditional massage ====
Aside from rituals and herbal medicine, an ubiquitous traditional healing method done by shamans and healers is massage with oils (lana) known as hilot or haplos. (Note: Also aplos (Bontoc); aptus (Ivatan); unar (Kalinga); kemkem (Pangasinan); ilot or ilut (Ilocano, Itawis, Zambal, & Pampango); ablon (northern Ilocano); ilu (Ibanag); ilat (Isneg); elot (Ilonggo); agod or agud (Maranao & Maguindanao); and hagud (Lumad)) It is still commonly practiced to this day.

=== Divination ===
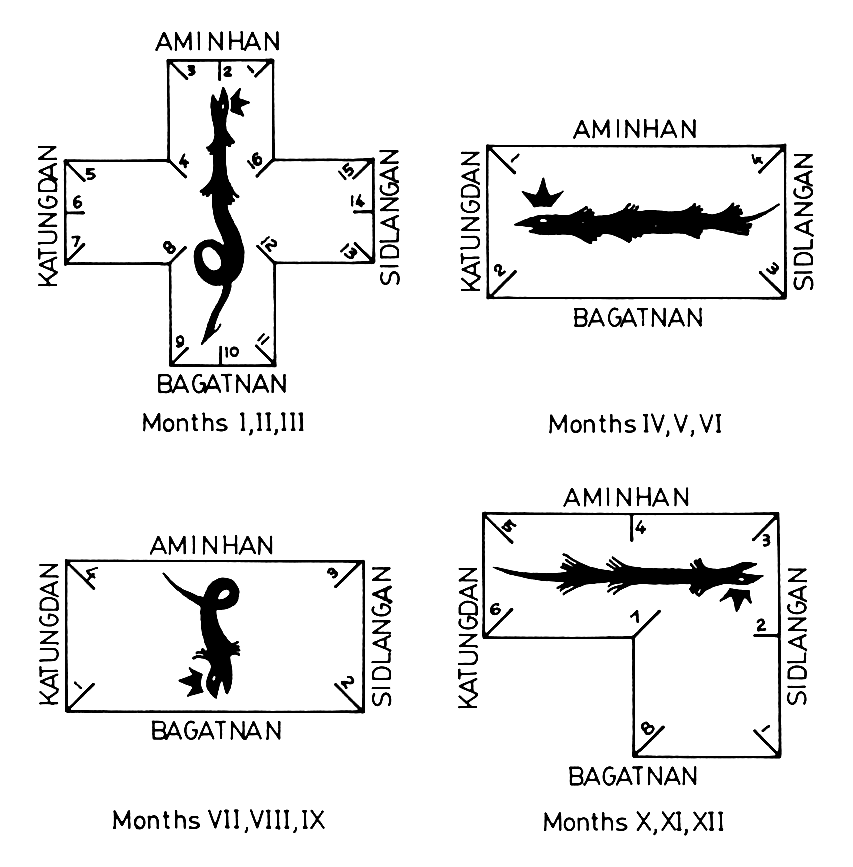
The rotation of the Bakunawa in a calendar year, as explained in Mansueto Porras' Signosan (1919)

Divination was closely tied to healing, as it was primarily used for diagnosing illnesses. It can be done by shamans or by specialized apprentices with the necessary skill. Various paraphernalia and rituals are used to diagnose illnesses: examples include seashells, ginger, crystals made of quartz or alum (tawas), and chicken entrails. Diviners have names that indicate their preferred methods. For example, a diviner who uses alum crystals is known as a magtatawas, while a diviner that prefers to conduct a ritual known as luop is known as a mangluluop.

Diviners are also able to foretell the future and perform geomancy rituals. A key mythological creature used in babaylan geomancy in the Visayas is the bakunawa (or naga), usually depicted as a gigantic serpent or dragon with a looped tail. The movements of the bakunawa affect the physical world, from the phases of the moon, to eclipses, the weather, floods, and earthquakes. The bakunawa is central to a sixteen-point compass rose. It faces a different cardinal direction every three months; facing north (aminhan), west (katungdan), south (bagatnan), and east (sidlangan) in a given twelve-month lunar year. The mouth of the bakunawa is believed to bring misfortune and evil, and various points on the compass had different aspects depending on where the mouth was facing. These were consulted when making future plans like travel, trade, or marriage. When building houses, shamans were also often consulted to determine the most propitious placement of the foundations to avoid the ill luck brought by the bakunawa. (Note: Similar beliefs exist throughout Southeast Asia. These include the Cambodian nak, Burmese naga, and Thai naag. Though the cycles do not correspond exactly, all of them were used as a sort of geomantic calendar.)

=== Sorcery ===
Some shamans were believed to be able to control the physical world through incantations, talismans, potions, or their spirit intermediaries. (Note: There are various names for sorcerers in Philippine ethnic groups, different from the term for "shaman". Most of these names have negative connotations, and thus is also translated to "witch" or "hag" in English sources. They include Bikol: parakaraw; Ilocano: managtanem, managinulod, mannamay; Ivatan: mamkaw, manulib; Kapampangan: mangkukusim (or mangkukusino); Pangasinan: manananem, mangngibawanen; Tagalog: mangkukulam (or mancocolam), mangagaway, may-galing, hukluban (or hukloban); Visayan: dalagangan, dunganon, dalongdongan, busalian, mamamarang (or mamalarang, barangan), usikan (or osikan), paktolan, sigbinan, manughiwit, mamumuyag, mang-aawog (or mang-aawug, mang-aaug).) Healers are more strongly associated with sorcerers than mediums. In most cases, a healer is also a sorcerer. In order to cure or counteract sorcerous illnesses, healers must themselves know sorcery. This relationship is most apparent in Siquijor Island, where healer-sorcerers are still common.

In some cultures, like the Manobo people, shamans are entirely differentiated from sorcerers. Shamans deal with the spirit world and supernatural beings but do not have magical powers of their own, while sorcerers are regarded as human beings with powers gained from magical spells or objects. Illnesses believed to be caused by sorcery are treated differently from illnesses caused by spirits. The former are treated with counter-spells, simple antidotes, and physical healing; while the latter requires the intervention or dialogue with the spirits and thus a shaman ritual.

In contrast, in Visayan societies, the most powerful shamans were sorcerers known as dalagangan (also dalongdongan or busalian). They could purportedly command the elements through magic spells and the strength of their kalag (or dungan) which was equated with "[spiritual] power". (Note: People with strong dungan are known as dunganon. They are described as being charismatic, very intelligent, confident, and strong-willed. They have a tendency to dominate others, and can do so without consciously being aware of it. They are natural leaders and are often respected ranking members of the community and thus tend to become sorcerers, shamans, chieftains, master craftsmen, or renowned warrior-heroes (known variously as bayani, bagani, or banwar in various Filipino ethnic groups). The concept of dungan is comparable to the term mana in Pacific Islander culture as well as similar "men of prowess" concepts in other Austronesian cultures. (Aguilar, 1998)) Their alleged powers include conjuring fire or water, flight, shape-shifting, invisibility, invulnerability, and the ability to call down disasters. The dios-dios leaders of the Visayan peasant revolts in the late 19th century often claimed to possess these kinds of powers. A more common use of the power to command elements is rainmaking. A notable example was Estrella Bangotbanwa, a Karay-a ma-aram from southern Iloilo. According to local legend, she alleviated a three-year drought by performing a ritual that summoned a rainstorm.

Sorcery was not restricted to shamans, but was also a common claim for leaders and warrior-heroes. In the pre-Islamic Maranao society depicted in the Darangen epic poem, heroes are born with "twin spirits" (tonong) that grant them superhuman abilities. King Awilawil o Ndaw of the kingdom of Kaibat a Kadaan, for example, has a tonong named Salindagaw Masingir that can take the aspect of typhoons, floods, and pillars of fire; while King Dalondong a Mimbantas of the kingdom of Gindolongan Marogong, has a tonong named Mabokelod, a tonong which takes the form of a giant crocodile.

==== Talismans and potions ====
Shamans can use multiple kinds of items in their work, such as talismans or charms known as agimat or anting-anting, curse deflectors (such as buntot pagi), and sacred oil concoctions, amongst others.

==== Black magic ====
Sorcerers are also believed to have powers that cause harm to other people covertly. Healer-sorcerers who practice this kind of sorcery usually justify it as a form of criminal punishment, as it is a widespread belief that black magic does not work on people who are innocent. Their targets are usually "wrongdoers" like thieves, adulterous spouses, or land grabbers. Sorcery of this type is seen as a kind of "justice", especially for people who cannot (or fail to) legally prosecute a wrongdoer.

There are also "true" sorcerers who are said to have hereditary sorcerous powers. Unlike healers, they do not consider the justice of their actions. These sorcerers are often conflated with aswang, evil vampire-like supernatural beings capable of appearing human (or were originally human).

The negative counterparts of the shamans are collectively called as witches. However, these witches actually include a variety of different kinds of people with differing occupations and cultural connotations depending on the ethnic group they are associated with. They are completely different from the Western notion of what a witch is. Notable examples of witches in a Philippine concept are the mannamay, witches known to the Ibanag people; mangkukulam, witches that use materials from nature and the cursee as a form of curse; and the mambabarang, witches that utilize insects as a form of curse.

== Social status ==
Babaylan were highly respected members of the community, on par with the pre-colonial noble class. In the absence of the datu (head of the community), the babaylan took on the role of interim head of the community. Babaylans were powerful ritual specialists who were believed to have influence over the weather and could make use of various spirits in the natural and spiritual realms. Babaylans were held in high regard since they were believed to possess powers that could block the dark magic of an evil datu or spirit and heal the sick or wounded. Among other powers, the babaylan could ensure a safe pregnancy and child birth. As a spiritual medium, babaylans also lead rituals with offerings to the various divinities or deities. As an expert in divine and herb lore, incantations, concoctions, remedies, antidotes, and a variety of potions made of various roots, leaves, and seeds, the babaylans were also regarded as allies of certain datus in subjugating an enemy. Hence, the babaylans were also known for their specialization in medical and divine combat. According to William Henry Scott, Katalonans could be of either sex, or male transvestites (bayoguin), but were usually women from prominent families who were wealthy in their own right. According to Luciano P. R. Santiago, as remuneration for their services, they received a good part of the offerings of food, wine, clothing, and gold, the quality and quantity of which depended on the social status of the supplicant. Thus, the catalonas held a lucrative as well as prestigious role in society.

Shamans of the many ethnicities in the Philippines always have another role in the community, aside from being spiritualists. Similar to the Shinto kannushi, a shaman could be a merchant, warrior, farmer, fisherfolk, blacksmith, craftsperson, weaver, potter, musician, or even a barber or chef, depending on the preference and skill of the shaman and the need of the community. Some shamans have more than two occupations at a time, especially if a community lacks people with the needed skills to take upon the role of certain jobs. This tradition of having two (or more) jobs has been ingrained in certain cultural societies in the Philippines, and is still practiced today by certain communities that have not been converted into Christianity. Some communities that have been converted into Islam have also preserved this tradition through Muslim imams.

In modern Philippine society, this role has largely been taken over by folk healers, who are now predominantly male, although some are still being falsely accused of being "witches". In areas where people have not been converted into Muslims or Christians, notably ancestral domains of indigenous peoples, shamans and their cultural traits have continued to exist with their respective communities, although these shamans and their practices are being slowly diluted by Abrahamic religions.

== Persecution, decline, and syncretization ==
The Spanish colonization of the Philippines, and the introduction of Catholic Christianity, resulted in the extinction of most native shamanistic practices. Christianity was initially seen by native Filipinos as another type of anito. The Spanish missionaries exploited this misconception in their successful conversion and occupation of most of the islands with minimal military support. Spanish friars were seen as "shamans" whose souls and spirit guides were apparently more powerful than the native ones. They desecrated religious objects, sacred trees, and sacred areas with impunity, earning the awe of the natives. They could also cure various diseases that the native shamans could not.

By the late 16th century, Christian symbols and paraphernalia (like rosaries, crucifixes, and holy water) became fetish objects, and Latin prayers and verses became part of the shaman's repertoire of magical chants and spells. Anito images (taotao) were replaced by Catholic idols and their rituals syncretized: for example, anito-like powers, such as miraculous healing or the ability to possess people, were attributed to the idols. (Note: Examples include the festivals of the Black Nazarene and the Santo Niño de Cebú (McCoy, 1982)) These flourished, as they were tolerated by the Spanish clergy as "white magic". During this period, nature spirits (diwata) were syncretized with the friars themselves, becoming known as engkanto and being described as having European features, along with a propensity for deceiving, seducing, and playing tricks on people.

The previously high status of the babaylan was lost under Spanish colonization. The role of women, and the relative gender egalitarianism of Philippine animistic cultures in general, became more subdued under the patriarchal culture of the Spanish. Most babaylan were stigmatized by the Catholic clergy as "priests of the devil", labeled as witches, satanists, or mentally unstable and harshly persecuted by the Spanish clergy. The Spanish burned down everything they associated with the native people's indigenous religions (including shrines such as the dambana), even forcefully ordering native children to defecate on their own gods' idols, murdering those who disobeyed. Spanish friars often sought out and persecuted female shamans in particular.

Spanish chroniclers also erased indigenous religious texts, claiming that the natives never had any religious writings, such as books. However, scholars agree that such statements reflected a desire by the colonizers to deny the existence of that which they did not approve of. For example, the Spanish chronicler Chirino claimed that the natives had no religious writings, but in the same account said that a native possessed an indigenous poetic book. The book was utilized by the natives to express a "deliberate pact" with what the Spanish called "the devil" which, contextually, was an indigenous god and not a demon. The book was one of many burned by order of the colonizers. The scholar Beyer also spoke of the time when a Spanish priest boasted about burning indigenous religious writings, "more than three hundred scrolls written in the native character". Chinese sources from before the Spanish colonial era maintain the existence of indigenous religious writings from the Philippines. For example, in 1349, the Chinese Wang Ta-yuan recorded that widows of important leaders in Manila spent the rest of their lives poring over indigenous religious texts. Spanish sources note that native writings were written on native reeds and leaves that were turned into a papyrus-like material, while iron points and other locally manufactured pointed objects were used pens. Bamboo was also utilized for writing. The native population had a high level of literacy even prior to Spanish contact, where every native could write in and read the indigenous writing systems.

An account of the conversion of a katalona was provided by a Spanish priest named Pedro Chirino (1604). He wrote that a blind katalona, named Diego Magsanga, along with his wife (who was said to be a skilled midwife), converted to Christianity. After he was baptized, he became a faithful assistant of the friars in expanding Christianity in Silang, Cavite, teaching children and adults the catechism. Chirino also reported that many people followed Magsanga and even the Jesuits could not surpass him when it came to devotion to the teachings of the Church and diligence in teaching his brethren. Magsanga was not a priest; his likely role was that of a hermano. Chirino also mentioned another male katalona who, together with a group of peers he was leading, was convinced by Jesuit priest Francisco Almerique to convert to Christianity. Chirino noted that this katalona wore his hair long (which is unusual for Tagalog men) and braided it to signify his priesthood. Before he was baptized in front of an audience, he cut his hair as a sign that the power of the anito had been broken.

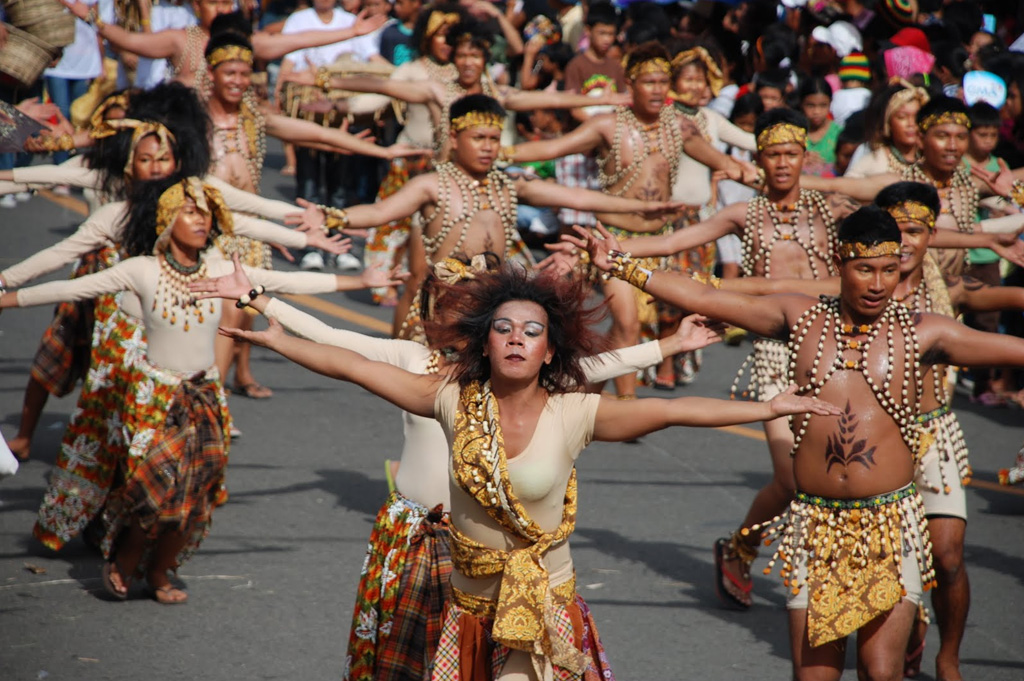
Performers depicting babaylans

Shamans who were assimilated by the church syncretized their roles into mysticism in the Christian context, becoming faith healers and miracle workers. These include the beata movement in the 17th and 18th centuries, the messianic (and usually revolutionary) dios-dios movement of the late 19th century, and the espiritista (or spiritista) movement of the 20th century. However, their methods of worship remained basically the same. The faith healers were still, in essence, mediums, but instead of channeling anito, they instead claimed to channel saints, angels, or the Holy Spirit. Late-20th-century and 21st-century faith healers also frequently use western esoteric and pseudoscientific terminology and practices (like psychic energy and psychic surgery), with little connection to traditional shamanic religions.

Other shamans abandoned the animistic aspects of shamanism and became folk healers (arbularyo), (Note: Derived from Spanish herbolario ("herbalist"). These generalist healers were also known by the Spanish as mediquillos, saludadores, or curanderos (Marco, 2001)) midwives, and practitioners of traditional hilot massage therapy with oils. These modern babaylan are usually male (except midwives). They are sought out by those with minor ailments or illnesses that modern medicine can not diagnose or cure. Like ancient babaylan, modern babaylan distinguish between "spiritual diseases" and "natural diseases"; the latter they will usually refer to a medical doctor.

Similarly, among Muslim Filipinos, shamans, usually male, are now relegated to folk healing and dealing with "indigenous" spirits. All other aspects of religious life of Muslim Filipinos have been taken over by Islamic religious leaders. A direct equivalent of the Christian Filipino "faith healers" and albolaryo are Islamized shamans known as pandita or guru. They follow Islam but also provide traditional healing practices and cultural rituals retained from their shamanistic past. They usually perform minor rites like aqiqah (cutting the hair of the firstborn) and ruqqiya (exorcism). A version of the traditional massage therapy conducted by folk healers also exists, known as agud or agod among the Maranao and Maguindanao people.

Most strongly affected by this religious shift to Abrahamic religions were the feminized male asog shamans. During the 17th to 18th centuries, Spanish administrators in the Philippines burned people convicted of homosexual relations at the stake and confiscated their possessions, in accordance with a decree by the president of the Real Audiencia, Pedro Hurtado Desquibel. Several instances of such punishments were recorded by the Spanish priest Juan Francisco de San Antonio in his Chronicas de la Apostolica Provincia de San Gregorio (1738–1744).

Feminized men were also persecuted harshly in the (then recently) Islamized ethnic groups in Mindanao. In Historia de las Islas de Mindanao, Iolo, y sus adyacentes (1667), the Spanish priest Francisco Combés records that their "unnatural crime" was punished by the Muslim peoples in Mindanao with death by burning or drowning, and that their houses and property were also burned, as they believed that the behavior was contagious.

== Resistance against colonial rule ==
A few followers of native shamanism resisted Spanish rule and conversion, especially in areas difficult to reach for Spanish missionaries, like the highlands of Luzon and the interiors of Mindanao. In Spanish-controlled areas (especially in the Visayas), entire villages would defy the policies of reducciónes (resettlement) and move deeper into the island interiors at the instigation of their babaylan. Shamanistic rituals also continued to be performed secretly in some areas, though these were punished by the Spanish clergy when discovered.

Open revolts led by shamans were common during Spanish rule. Aside from the early revolts in the 17th century, most of these were led by religious leaders who practiced Folk Catholicism rather than true shamanism.

=== 17th century ===
The first recorded armed revolt led by a babaylan was the Tamblot uprising of Bohol in 1621–1622. It was led by a male shaman named Tamblot who saw the spread of Catholicism as a threat. He rallied about two thousand followers in an effort to "return to the old ways", but his rebellion was crushed by the Spanish authorities with the help of converted native auxiliaries.

Tamblot's revolt inspired another rebellion in neighboring Carigara, Leyte, in the same time period. The Bankaw revolt was led by a datu named Bankaw and his son Pagali who was a babaylan. Bankaw's rebellion was notable, as Bankaw was one of the first converts to Catholicism in the Philippines. As a young man, he had formerly welcomed the conquistador Miguel López de Legazpi in 1565 when their expedition first landed on the islands. Like Tamblot, Bankaw and Pagali both wanted a return to the old ways. Bankaw renounced his Catholic faith and built a temple to a diwata. Their rebellion was defeated by the Spanish Governor-general Alonso Fajardo de Entenza. Bankaw was beheaded, while Pagali and eighty-one other babaylan were burned at the stake.

The Tapar rebellion was an uprising in Iloilo, Panay, led by a babaylan named Tapar in 1663. Tapar syncretized native shamanism with Catholic terminology and declared himself "God Almighty" of a new religion. He also emulated the ancient asog by dressing up in women's clothing. He and his followers killed a Spanish priest and burned the town church before escaping to the mountains. Tapar and other leaders of his movement were captured and executed by Spanish and Filipino soldiers.

=== 18th century ===
A religious uprising in 1785 in Ituy (modern Aritao), Nueva Vizcaya, was led by a healer named Lagutao. He claimed that an outbreak of smallpox in northern Luzon was a result of the natives abandoning their ancestral beliefs. It was suppressed by neighboring Christian townsmen led by Dominican friars.

=== 19th century ===
The 19th century saw the rise of the dios-dios "shamans". Dios-dios (literally "god pretender" or "false god", from Spanish dios) were religious leaders so named because of their penchant for identifying themselves with Christian religious figures. They led cult-like religious movements, promising prosperity, supernatural powers, or healing to their followers. Most were mere charlatans selling amulets and magical pieces of paper. Their members were mostly from the illiterate rural poor who had little knowledge of formal Catholic teachings and were living in extreme poverty under colonial rule.

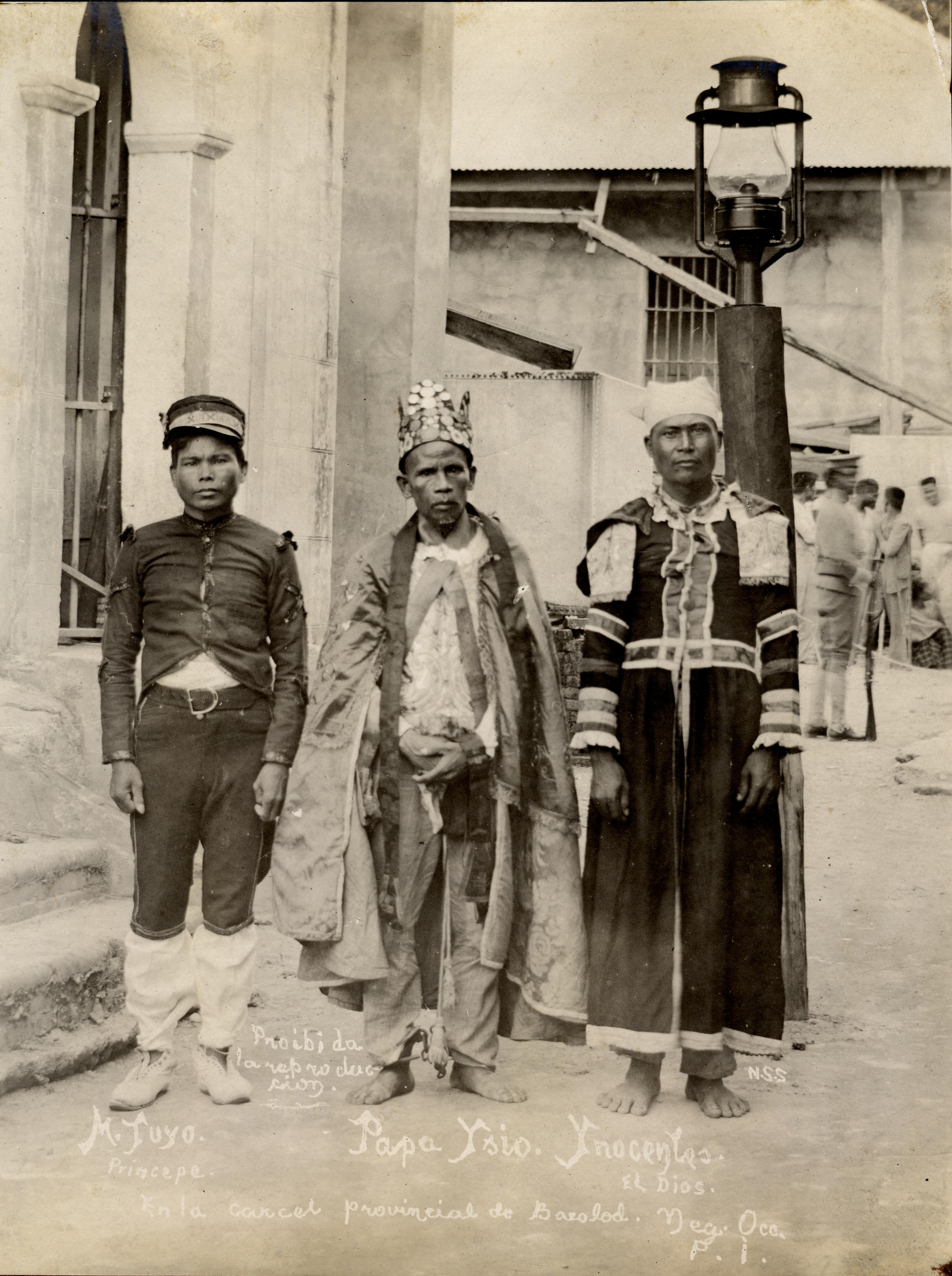
Papa Isio with two babaylanes followers in a prison in Bacolod after his surrender to American authorities in 1907. Note his "Papal vestments" and the woman's dress worn by the man to his left.

There are numerous examples of dios-dios leaders in the 19th century. They include Lungao, a healer from Ilocos, who claimed, in 1811, that he was Jesus Christ; Ignacio Dimas, who led the "Tres Cristos" ("Three Christs") of Libmanan, Nueva Cáceres (modern Camarines Sur), who claimed, in 1865, that they had supernatural powers over diseases; Benedicta, an old woman and a healer who called herself "La Santa de Leyte" ("The Saint of Leyte"), and prophesied, in 1862, that the island of Leyte would sink; Clara Tarrosa, an eighty-year-old babaylan in Tigbauan, Iloilo who, in the late 1880s, proclaimed herself the Virgin Mary and isolated herself and her followers from Spanish rule; Francisco Gonzalez (alias "Francisco Sales" or "Fruto Sales") of Jaro, Leyte who claimed, in 1888, that he was a king sent to save people from another great flood by leading them to a city that would rise from the waves; and many more. These movements were usually suppressed by the Spanish by imprisoning their leaders or exiling them.

The dios-dios movement was initially purely religious, only reacting defensively to Spanish persecution. However, by the 1880s, some dios-dios groups became more violently anti-colonial. The first such group was the one led by Ponciano Elofre, a cabeza de barangay of a sitio of Zamboanguita, Negros Oriental. He took the name "Dios Buhawi" ("Whirlwind God") and proclaimed himself the savior of the people. He declared that they would stop paying taxes to the Spanish government. He formed a community of around two thousand followers (whom the Spanish authorities called the babaylanes) and would regularly attack Spanish-controlled towns. Emulating the ancient asog shamans, he dressed in women's clothing and assumed feminine mannerisms even though he was married to a woman. He claimed supernatural powers much like the ancient dalagangan. He was killed while attacking the town of Siaton in 1887. His wife and relatives attempted to continue the movement, but they were eventually captured and exiled by Spanish authorities. The remnants of the group either descended to banditry or joined other dios-dios movements.

Another dios-dios uprising was led by a shaman named Gregorio Lampinio (better known as "Gregorio Dios", and also known as "Hilario Pablo" or "Papa") in Antique, beginning in 1888. The uprising was formed near Mount Balabago, a sacred pilgrimage site for shamans. Lampinio led a force of around 400 people. They collected contribuciones babaylanes (a revolutionary tax), disseminated anti-colonial ideas, and launched attacks on towns in Antique and Iloilo. The group was eventually suppressed by the Guardia Civil by 1890.

The last significant dios-dios rebellion in the 19th century was led by Dionisio Magbuelas, better known as Papa Isio ("Pope Isio"). He was a former member of the Dios Buhawi group. He organized his own babaylanes group from remnants of Elofre's followers and led an uprising in Negros Occidental in 1896 against Spanish rule. After the Philippines was ceded to the United States at the end of the Spanish–American War, he was initially made "military chief" of La Castellana, Negros Occidental, under the American government. However, he picked up armed resistance again in 1899, during the Philippine–American War. He surrendered on August 6, 1907, to American authorities and was sentenced to death. This was later commuted to life imprisonment and he died in Old Bilibid Prison in 1911.

=== 20th century ===
Concurrent with Papa Isio's rebellion against American rule in Negros Occidental, the dios-dios movement in eastern Visayas turned their attention to the new American colonial government. Calling themselves the Pulajanes ("those who wear red"), they were led by Faustino Ablen ("Papa Faustino") in Leyte and Pablo Bulan ("Papa Pablo"), Antonio Anugar, and Pedro de la Cruz in Samar. Like their predecessors, they claimed supernatural powers and used fetishistic amulets, holy oils, and magic spells in battle. They attacked both American troops and local Filipinos cooperating with the American colonial government. The last Pulajanes leader was killed in 1911.

== See also ==
- Philippine mythology
- Bobohizan
- Gabâ
- Hun and po
- Kahuna
- Mana
- Miko
- Negros Revolution
- Santería
- Tamblot Uprising
- Two-spirit
- Indigenous religious beliefs of the Tagalog people
- Usog
- Pasma
