= Modesto P. Sa-onoy =

- Born: July 4, 1938 (age 88); La Castellana, Negros Occidental, Philippines
- Occupations: Historian, Academic

Academic background
- Education: La Consolacion College Bacolod (BA, MA)

Modesto P. Sa-onoy (born July 4, 1938) is a Filipino historian and journalist specializing in the history of Negros Island in the Philippines.

== Biography ==
He was born in La Castellana, Negros Occidental. He is an alumnus of La Consolacion College in Bacolod, graduating there from high school in 1956, Bachelor of Arts in 1961, Bachelor of Science in Education in 1963 and Master of Arts in Education in 1965.

He has twice been President of the Negros Press Club, first in 1982-1983, second in 1989-1990. He is married to Ma. Verobina Abeto and has two children, Aufred Paul and Angela Rosario. Conferred with Ang Banwahanon Award by the City of Bacolod, its highest recognition, October 19, 2001 Recognized with Most Outstanding Alumni Award by La Consolacion College, Bacolod, March 12, 2006 Conferred by Pope Benedict XVI the knighthood, Pontifical Equestrian Order of Pope St. Sylvester with rank of Commander and Great Zeal - October 25, 2008 Acclaimed Stalwart of the Negros Press Club, October 10, 2009 Recognized by the Rotary Club of Bacolod East with Media Lifetime Award,

== Works ==
- Brief History of the Church in Negros Occidental, (1976)
- Valderrama, (1978)
- The Chinese in Negros, (1980)
- The Dentists of Negros, (1981)
- Negros Occidental History, First Edition, (1992)
- Through the Years: History of La Consolacion, Bacolod, (1993)
- A Glance at Bacolod, (1998)
- Genealogy of the Marañon-Miraflores Family, (2002)
- Occidental Negros History, Second Edition, (2003)
- Genealogy of the Sa-onoy Family, (2004)
- Ordeals of War (Ed.), (2006)
- Parroquia de San Diego: 1776-2006, (2006)
- Church on a Hill: History of Diocese of Bacolod, (2008)
- Against the Rising Sun: Guerrilla War in Negros Island, 1941-1945, Vol I, (2011)
