= Eric Gamalinda =

Filipino poet (born 1956)

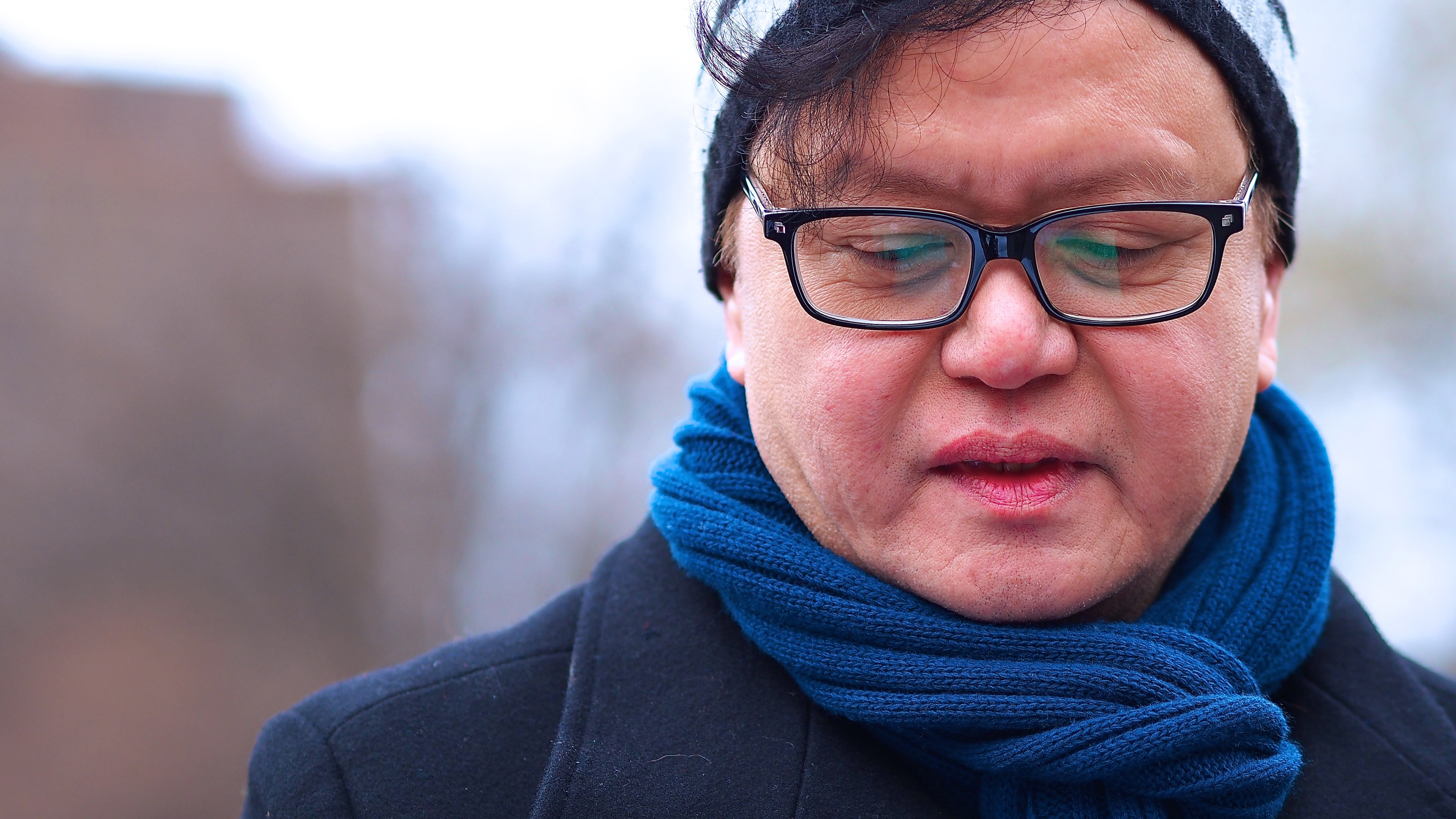
- Eric Gamalinda at a rally in Washington Square, New York in December 2014
- Born: Eric Gamalinda; Manila, Philippines

Mario Eric Gamalinda (born October 14, 1956 in Quezon City, Philippines) is a poet, fiction writer, playwright, and experimental filmmaker from the Philippines.

Recognition for his work includes a New York State Council of the Arts grant for film and media [2014], the Cultural Center of the Philippines Independent Film and Video Awards [2004], the Asian American Literary Award and the Alice James Books New York/New England Selection for Zero Gravity [poems, 2000], the New York Foundation for the Arts [fiction, 1998], the Philippine Centennial Literary Prize for My Sad Republic [novel, 1998], the Philippine National Book Award twice for Planet Waves [novel, 1990] and My Sad Republic [2000], and the Asiaweek Short Story Competition [1985]. He has also won the Philippines’ top literary prize, the Palanca Memorial Awards, several times for poetry, fiction, non-fiction and playwriting. He was a featured poet in The Dodge Festival's Poets Among Us program in 1996. In 2009, his novel, The Descartes Highlands, was shortlisted for the Man Asian Prize. In 2010, his three-act play, Resurrection, was staged off-Broadway at the Clurman Theater on 42nd Street by Diverse City Inc.

He has been in residence at Civitella Ranieri [Italy], Association d’Art de La Napoule [France], Chateau de Lavigny Residence pour Ecrivains [Switzerland], Fundacion Valparaiso [Spain], The Rockefeller Foundation in Bellagio [Italy], Hawthornden Castle International Retreat for Writers [Scotland], and The Corporation of Yaddo, The MacDowell Colony, The Helene Wurlitzer Foundation of New Mexico, The Virginia Center for the Creative Arts, Ledig House International Writers Colony [US]. In 2013 he returned to Fundacion Valparaiso to work on a new novel.

He was a publications director of the Asian American Writers Workshop until 1997, Distinguished Visiting Writer at the University of Hawaii in Manoa in 1999, and visiting scholar at New York University’s Asia Pacific American Studies Program in 2002-2003. He currently teaches at Columbia University’s Center for the Study of Ethnicity and Race.

== Magazine and journal publication ==
His stories have been published in Harper's Magazine and anthologized in Manila Noir [Akashic Books]; Charlie Chan is Dead 2: At Home in the World [Penguin]; The Thirdest World [factory school]; Bold Words: A Century of Asian American Writing [Rutgers University Press]; Juncture: New Experimental Writing [Soft Skull]; In My Life: Encounters with the Beatles [Fromm International]; Balikbayan: Racconti filippini contemporanei [Feltrinelli, Milan]. A new story will soon appear in Manila Noir [Akashic Books].

His poems have been anthologized in Language for a New Century [W.W. Norton]; Structure & Surprise [Teachers & Writers Collaborative]; Stranger at Home [Interpoezia/Numina Press]; Saints of Hysteria [Soft Skull Press]; Poetry Daily [Sourcebooks Inc.]; Sweet Jesus [The Anthology Press]; Returning a Borrowed Tongue [Coffee House Press]; Brown River, White Ocean [Rutgers University Press]; Lo Ultimo de Filipinas: Antologia Poetica [Huerga y Fierro, Madrid].

His essays have been anthologized in Vestiges of War: The Philippine–American War and the Aftermath of an Imperial Dream [New York University Press, 2003] and Pinoy Poetics [Meritage Press, CA, 2004].

== Works ==
=== Novels ===
- —— (1989). Planet Waves. Manila: New Day.
- —— (1990). Confessions of a Volcano. Manila: Anvil Publishers.
- —— (1992). Empire of Memory. Manila: Anvil Publishers.
- —— (2000). My Sad Republic. Diliman: University of the Philippines Press.
- —— (2014). The Descartes Highlands. Brooklyn: Akashic Books.

=== Short fiction collections ===
- —— (1992). Peripheral Vision. Manila: New Day.
- —— (2012). People Are Strange. New York: Black Lawrence Press.

=== Poetry collections ===
- —— (1991). Lyrics from a Dead Language. Manila: Anvil Publishers.
- —— (1999). Zero Gravity. Farmington, Maine: Alice James Books.
- —— (2007). Amigo Warfare. Cincinnati: Cherry Grove Collections.

=== Anthology ===
- Flippin': Filipinos on America [Asian American Writers Workshop, New York, 1996]
