= List of Philippine mythological figures =

The following is a list of gods, goddesses, deities, and many other divine, semi-divine, and important figures from classical Philippine mythology and indigenous Philippine folk religions collectively referred to as diwata, whose expansive stories span from a hundred years ago to presumably thousands of years from modern times.

The list does not include creatures; for these, see list of Philippine mythological creatures.

== Overview ==
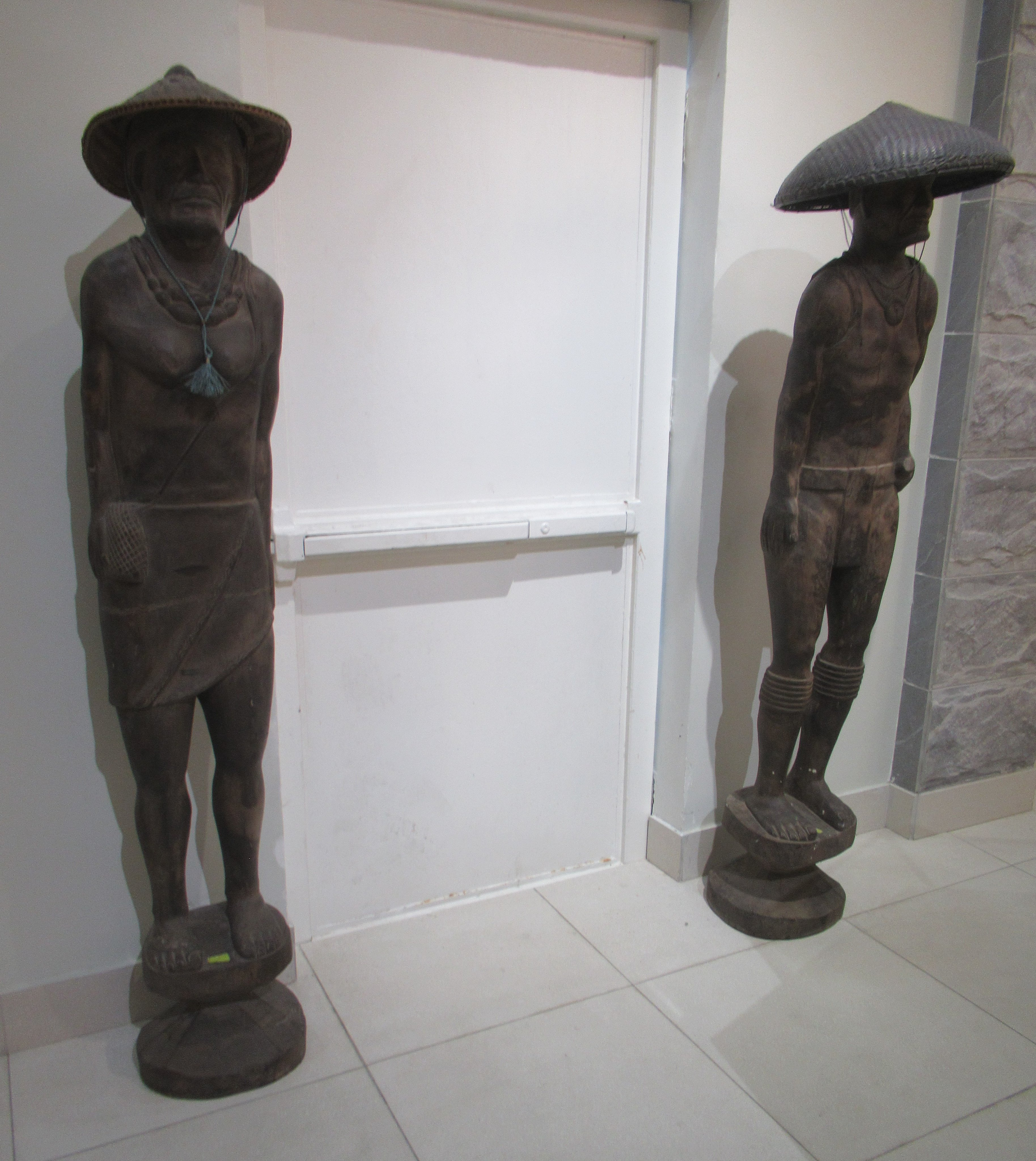
Household deity gate guardians Indigenous Philippine folk religions

The mythological figures, including deities (diwatas), heroes, and other important figures. Each ethnic group has their own distinct pantheon of deities. Some deities of ethnic groups have similar names or associations, but remain distinct from one another. The diversity in these important figures is exhibited in many cases, of which a prime example is the Ifugao pantheon, where in a single pantheon, deities alone are calculated to number at least 1,500. There are over a hundred distinct pantheons in the Philippines.

Some ethnic groups have pantheons ruled by a supreme deity (or deities), while others revere ancestor spirits and/or the spirits of the natural world, where there is a chief deity but consider no deity supreme among their divinities. in the country is anito. The term itself can be further divided into ninuno or anito (ancestral spirits) and diwata (gods, goddesses, and deities), although in many cases, the meaning of the terms differ depending on their ethnic association.

The following figures continue to exist and prevail among the collective memory and culture of Filipinos today, especially among adherents to the native and sacred Filipino religions, despite centuries of persecution beginning with the introduction of non-native Islam and colonial Christianity which sought to abolish all native faiths in the archipelago beginning in the late 14th century, and intensified during the middle of the 16th century to the late 20th century. This contact between native and foreign faiths later accumulated more stories, which also became part of both faiths, with some alterations. Deity, spirit, and hero figures continue to be viewed as important and existing among native faiths and the general Filipino culture. These perceptions of existence towards gods, goddesses, deities, and spirits in the sacred native Filipino religions, are the same as how Christians perceive the existence of their God and the same way Muslims perceive the existence of their Allah. There have been proposals to revitalize the indigenous Philippine folk religions and make them the national religion of the country during the First Philippine Republic, but the proposal did not prosper, as the focus at the time was the war against Spanish and, later, American colonizers.

== Ivatan ==
=== Immortals ===
- Mayo: the supreme being; rituals are offered to Mayo especially during the fishing season
- Mayo: a fisherfolk hero who introduced the yuyus used to catch flying fishes called dibang, which are in turn used to catch the summertime fish arayu
- The Giver: the entity who provides all things; the souls of the upper class travel to the beings's abode in heaven and become stars
- Añitu: refers to the souls of the dead, place spirits, and wandering invisibles not identified nor tied down to any particular locale or thing
- Añitu between Chavidug and Chavayan: place spirit Añitus who were reported to create sounds when the gorge between Chavidug and Chavayan were being created through dynamite explosions; believed to have shifted their residences after the construction of the passage
- Rirryaw Añitu: place spirit Añitus who played music and sang inside a cave in Sabtang, while lighting up fire; believed to have change residences after they were disturbed by a man
- ji Rahet Añitu: a grinning place spirit Añitu who lived in an old tree; a man later cut the tree and found an earthen pot believed to have been owned by the Añitu
- Nuvwan Añitu: good place spirit Añitus who saved a woman from a falling tree; they are offered rituals through the vivyayin
- ji P'Supwan Añitu: good place spirit Añitus who became friends and allies of a mortal woman named Carmen Acido; sometimes taking in the form of dogs, they aided her and guided her in many of her tasks until her death from old age; despite their kindness towards Carmen, most people avoided the farm where they live
- Mayavusay Añitu: place spirit Añitus living in a parcel of land in Mayavusay; sometimes take in the form of piglets, and can return cut vegetation parts into the mother vegetation
- Cairn-dwelling Añitu: place spirit Añitus who lived in cairns and put a curse towards a man who destroyed their home; appearing as humans, the shaman Balaw conversed with them to right the wrong made by the man against their home
- Mayuray Añitu: a wandering Añitu who expanded and was filled with darkness; encountered by a young boy who the spirit did not harm; referred as a kapri, Añitus who walk around and grow as tall as the height for their surroundings
- Dayanak Añitu: a type of very small Añitu with red eyes and gold ornaments; accepting their gold ornaments will cause misfortune

=== Mortals ===
- Benita: a mortal woman who was visited by her deceased husband in the form of an Añitu, which led to the return of three parcels of land to their rightful owner; in another story, she was visited by her deceased goddaughter, which led to proper rituals which appeased her goddaughter's soul
- Maria: a mortal woman who was visited by the silent Añitu of her husband's relative; the spirit was later appeased through prayers
- Juanito: a mortal man who was visited in a dream by his deceased father's Añitu, which led to him relenting to give more share of the family inheritance to his half-sister, Maring
- Wife of Leoncio Cabading: visited by her deceased husband's Añitu, who told her to stop the prayers for it will do nothing as he was killed by a violent landslide; the spirit offered her to join him, to which she rejected
- Carmen Acido: a mortal woman who became friends and allies of the Añitu from ji P'Supwan; she lived to over 80 years old
- Balaw: a medicine man and shaman who communicated and controlled certain Añitus
- Maria Barios: a woman whose back-basket was ridden by a wandering Añitu, who she carried until she arrived at the town center
- Juan Galarion: a man who saw a giant wandering Añitu, as large as the church of Mahataw; he believed it was a kapri
- Tita: a girl who was kidnapped and later returned by wandering Añitus; while being carried by the Añitus, she menstruated, which made the Añitus flee; the site where she landed is known as Ranum ñi Tita

== Isneg (Apayao) ==
=== Immortals ===
- Chief Spirits: may take the form of human beings, former mortals who mix with the living, and reside in bathing places
  - Anlabban: looks after the general welfare of the people; special protector of hunters
  - Bago: the spirit of the forest
  - Sirinan: the spirit of the river
- Landusan: responsible for some cases of extreme poverty; like all evil spirits, Landusan can also be countered by the rare tagarut herb-amulet
- Helpful Harvest Spirits
  - Abad
  - Aglalannawan
  - Anat
  - Binusilan
  - Dawiliyan
  - Dekat
  - Dumingiw
  - Imbanon
  - Gimbanonan
  - Ginalinan
  - Sibo
  - llanit: a group of sky dwellers
- Spirits Who Harm the Harvest
  - Alupundan: causes the reapers’ toes to get sore all over and swell
  - Arurin: deity who sees to it that the harvest is bad if farmers fail to offer to her a share of the harvest
  - Dagdagamiyan: a female spirit who causes sickness in children for playing in places where the harvest is being done
  - Darupaypay: devours the palay stored in the hut before it is transferred to the granary
  - Ginuudan: comes to measure the containers of palay, and causes it to dwindle
  - Sildado: resembles a horse, and kills children who play noisily outside the house
  - Inargay: kills people during harvest time; the inapugan ritual of offered to the deity to appease him not to kill anyone
- Alipugpug: spirit of the little whirlwind from the burned field, who portends a good harvest
- Pilay: spirit of the rice, who resides on the paga, a shelf above the hearth; the pisi ritual is offered to the deity to ensure that children won't get hungry
- Unnamed Man: held the world on his hands; produced a spark using a flint and a steel, causing Sal-it (lightning); in contrast, Addug (thunder) is the water roaring in the sky

=== Mortals ===
- Man Who Caused Birds to Attack: a man who was aided by birds, by giving him seeds that he was tasked to plant and share with other birds; reneged on his promise, resulting to the never-ending attacks of birds on the seeds planted by mankind
- Man Who Hates Flies: a man whose cow was killed by a fly, which resulted into a law that allowed the killing of flies

== Tinguian (Itneg) ==
=== Immortals ===
- The Triad: three most powerful deities, whose ranks differ per Itneg locality; three accounts exist, one is that all three are forms of a single deity, second is that the three are distinct while one of them is supreme, & third is that the three are distinct and each possess the same rank as supreme deities
  - Kadaklan: the supreme deity & most powerful in many accounts; created the sun, moon, stars, and earth; married to the once-mortal Agemem; second in rank in one account; taught the people how to pray, harvest their crops, ward off evil spirits, and overcome bad omens and cure sicknesses
  - Bagatulayan: the supreme deity who directs the activities of the world, ruling over the universe as he watches down on earth; provided the laws in which order is based upon; referred also as the Great Anito
  - Kabuniyan: the supreme deity who is the most loved & revered among the primal deities; depicted as a friendly and loving god with a spear and a head-axe; went down onto earth as ordered by the deity Kadaklan; taught the people agriculture, ritual life, and many others; married the once-mortal Ginnalingan; believed to sometimes walk among mortals as a giant
- Agemem: a mortal who was deified upon marriage with the deity Kadaklan; together, they had two sons
- Ginnalingan: a mortal who was deified upon marriage with the deity Kabuniyan; believed to be born at the present-day village of Makudkura, although multiple villages contest this; along with her husband, she taught the people how to defend themselves from evil spirits
- Ina nga Daga: the mother earth & personification of the earth; supports the village, center of the cosmological view, rivers, spring, fields, hills, mountains, forests, trees, plants, birds, and everything that helps humans in life
- Anito: a term which encompasses both spirits of the natural and spiritual worlds and spirits of the dead
- Gomayen: mother of Mabaca, Binongan, and Adasin
- Mabaca: one of the three founders of the Tinguian's three ancient clans; daughter of Gomayen and the supreme deity
- Binongan: one of the three founders of the Tinguian's three ancient clans; daughter of Gomayen and the supreme deity
- Adasin: one of the three founders of the Tinguian's three ancient clans; daughter of Gomayen and the supreme deity
- Emlang: servant of the supreme deity
- Shrine spirits
  - Apadel (Kalagang): also called Apdel; guardian deity and dweller of the spirit-stones called pinaing
  - Pinpina-ing: spirits who reside in shrines for some communities, while other communities use the term for spirits of the forests
  - Labon: shrine spirits from Dulaw; the term means abundance
  - Gimbangonan: a spirit revered at Mataragan's shrines; one of the names of Kabuniyan's wife
  - Imagtanongan: a helpful male spirit
  - Ibabakudan: a protective female spirit
  - Ibibilian: a female spirit guarding against enemy raids
- Astral deities: good spirits created by the god Kadaklan
  - Apo Init: also called Sinag, the deity of the sun; also known as Init-init, he is married to the mortal Aponibolinayen; during the day, he leaves his house to shine light on the world
  - Apo Bulan: the deity of the moon
  - Apo Bitbitwen: the deity of the stars
- Deities of atmospheric phenomenon
  - Angin: deity of the wind
  - Bayon: deity of the breeze
  - Kidol: also called Kido-ol, deity of thunder
  - Kimat: also called Salit, deity of the sky's lightning
  - Kilawit: deity of the earth's lightning
  - Degges: also called Udan, deity of the rain
  - Other deities presiding over the rainbow, clouds, and so on
- Gaygayoma: the star goddess who lowered a basket from heaven to fetch the mortal Aponitolau, who she married
- Bagbagak: father of Gaygayoma
- Sinang: mother of Gaygayoma
- Takyayen: child of Gaygayoma and Aponitolaul popped out between Gaygayoma's last two fingers after she asked Aponitolau to prick there
- Makaboteng: the god and guardian of deer and wild hogs
- Idadanum: spirits of rivers who sometimes appear as mermaids trying to snatch people away
- Inawen: spirits of the sea
- Ibabantay: spirits of the mountain
- Idatag: spirit of the plains
- Kaiba-an: spirits of the rice fields who are offered deposits in bamboo baskets called atang in the lowlands and sallukong in the uplands
- Sabi-an: lord of the hunting dogs
- Sannadan: lord of wild deer and hogs; also specifically referred as Pitulok in the communities of Bawyan; enjoys hearing the sound of mouth bow musical instrument, called tabankaw, forgetting to protect deer and hogs in the process
- Selday: steals dead peoples' bodies
- Akup: embraces widows in mourning
- Kumaw: expects children to be 'sacrificed' in construction, especially for bridges
- Alan: a shape-shifter whose true appearance is a ten-headed giant who is always present at funeral occasions, trying to snatch away corpses
- Ibuwa: beings of the burial ground who try to steal dead bodies; enemies of mankind who are repelled using iron
- Idadaya: ruler of the upstream regions; has ten grandchildren personifying the watersheds
- Inginlaud: lord of the downstream regions

=== Mortals ===
- Aponibolinayen: mortal spouse of the sun god, Init-init
- Aponitolau: mortal who was fetched by the star goddess Gaygayoma, despite him being already married

== Kalinga ==
=== Immortals ===
- Kabunyan: the supreme deity; also called Kadaklan (the Greatest), who drives bad spirits away, making the soil suitable for good crops
- KiDul: the god of thunder
- KiLat: the god of lightning
- DumaNig: a demon which possesses the moon (Bolan) and causes her to devour her husband the sun (Ageo)
- NamBisayunan: the howl or shriek that is heard during a storm
- Libo-o d Ngatu: the clouds of the skyworld which cause sickness
- Maman: beings derived from a second death of souls in the afterworld; they are perceptible in red light, as on a rainy day near sunset; may cause sickness
- Bungun: the god of the rainbow
- Mamlindao: hunting spirits
- Bulaiyao: live in big rocks, hot springs, and volcanoes; have a fiery appearance which they can turn on or turn off; capture or devour souls
  - Gulilingob ud Tangob: the strongest of all the bulaiyao
- Dumabag: the god of the volcano at Balatok
- Lumawig: the local god of the Mangali-Lubo-Tinglaiyan district
- Angako d Ngato: demons that afflict with sickness
- Angtan: goddesses or demons that depress men, bring worry and bad luck
- Alan: cannibal or ghoul spirits that figure largely in myths and folktales as carrying away or devouring souls and as producing many kinds of transformations in men and in themselves
- Anitu: the souls of the dead
- Pinading: extraordinary souls of the dead that have attained a superior power and existence
- Gittam: a giant who established himself in the realm called Daya after killing many humans; lives in an island out in a big lake
- Python of Gittam: protects the habitat of Gittam; swallowed a boy, who was rescued by a hero by killing the giant python
- Iyu: water creatures who swim in the lakes of Lagud; depicted as a whale, an eel, a dragon, or, in some cases, a python also called Malaga

== Ibanag, Itawis, Malaweg ==
=== Immortals ===
- Makapangwa: the supreme being who is also known as Yafu; a nurturing deity who is also referred as Namaratu (the creator)
- Vulan: the queen of the serene night; in another version, she is also referred as Luna, the moon goddess who fell in love with the god Mar
- Mar: son of the sea god, who was imprisoned by his father for falling in love with the moon goddess Luna
- Sun god: father of Luna; referred also a Bilag
- Sea god: father of the deity Mar
- Aran: Tiny human-like beings that reside in trees, anthills, dark spaces and are neither evil nor good.
- Aggirigira: Invisible beings that cause mischief, diseases and misfortunes
- Anitu: Ancestor Spirits
- Biuag: a deified culture hero who possessed a golden lace amulet
- Malana: a deified culture hero who possessed a golden axe amulet
- Carango/Carangat: spirits or supernatural beings who have never been human

== Gad'dang, Gaddang, Yogad ==
=== Immortals ===
- Nanolay: creator of all things; a culture hero and a beneficent deity; never inflicts pain or punishment on the people; responsible for the origin and development of the world
- Ofag: cousin of Nanolay; personification of evil
- Talanganay: a male god-spirit; enters the body of a healer and gives instructions on how to heal the sick while in a trance
- Menalam: a female goddess-spirit; enters the body of a healer and gives instructions on how to heal the sick while in a trance
- Bunag: god of the earth
- Limat: god of the sea
- Carangat: spirits or supernatural beings who have never been human; they live like humans, but in a spiritual sense, clothing themselves with the 'soul' of clothes, eating the 'soul' of food, and so on; also believed by the Itaves (Itawes) & Yogad, as well as the Ibanag who call them carango, while the Ifugao call them kalangat; they cause various kinds of illness, except stomach illness; they are the owners of the land and thus, humans must never violate their rights; they have four major leaders, namely:
  - Dumadaga: king of the Carangat; referred as 'the Increaser'; married to Siloit and Alucasianan
  - Siloit: called 'the Whizzler' for she makes a whistling noise when she comes upon the invitation of shamans
  - Adayag: referred as 'the Wobbler' due to his peculiar gait; a minister of Dumadaga
  - Alucasianan: a female spirit with narrow loins
- Ghost-Deities: all of the spirits of maingal men and women who have gone into the afterlife, arriving at the downstream region called Dilod; they are the upholders of customs and retain their immense strength even as ghosts; although the Calangat are enemies of most living humans, they are considered friends by the Ghost-Deities, which in turn can benefit the living maingal descendants of Ghost-Deities; some Ghost-Deities include:
  - Aggabau: the leader of all Ghost-Deities and referred as the 'Onlooker-From-Above'; he was the first man, and was called Guiladan when he was still human; he is said to now live in So Lutap na Dulam (a place in the midst of the clouds); invoked only during cases of extreme necessity
  - Dauirauin: the Ghost-Deity who likes to roam around; his abode is on top of the mountain
  - Ambatali: referred as 'the Metamorphic', as he loves to take the appearance of animals or a black or red-skinned human; also referred as Amalibali, meaning the changeling; he is also called Macanuang when under his water buffalo form; he lives in the clouds
  - Carinuan: wife of Aggabau; the brightest, lightest, most transparent & subtle of the Ghost-Deities, comparable to the wind
  - Gatan
  - Lumanindag
- Caralau na Pinatay: souls of the non-maingal deceased
- Biuag: a deified culture hero; ally of Malana
- Malana: a deified culture hero; ally of Biuag

=== Mortals ===
- Magat: a culture hero
- Battalan: a culture hero
- Bayun: a culture hero
- Biuag of Cabagan: a maingal who once traveled to Manila & possessed immense strength
- Lacay Enrique: a maingal of Bagabag who possessed immense strength

== Bontok ==
=== Immortals ===
- Intutungcho (Kabunian): the supreme deity living above; also referred to as Kabunian; father of Lumawig and two other sons
- Lumawig: also referred as the supreme deity and the second son of Kabunian; an epic hero who taught the Bontoc their five core values for an egalitarian society
- First Son of Kabunian
- Third Son of Kabunian
- Chal-chal: the god of the sun whose son's head was cut off by Kabigat; aided the god Lumawig in finding a spouse
- Kabigat: the goddess of the moon who cut of the head of Chal-chal's son; her action is the origin of headhunting
- Son of Chal-chal: his head was cut off by Kabigat; revived by Chal-chal, who bear no ill will against Kabigat
- Ob-Obanan: a deity whose white hair is inhabited by insects, ants, centipedes, and all the vermins that bother mankind; punished a man for his rudeness by giving him a basket filled with all the insects and reptiles in the world
- Chacha’: the god of warriors
- Ked-Yem: the god of blacksmiths who cut off the heads of the two sons of Chacha’ because they were destroying his work; was later challenged by Chacha’, which eventually led into a pechen pact to stop the fighting
- Two Sons of Chacha’: beheaded by Ked-Yem, because they were destroying his work

=== Mortals ===
- Fucan: younger of the two girls met by Lumawig in Lanao; married to Lumawig; later adopted the name Cayapon; died after dancing in a taboo way, which led to death being the norm among mortals
- Two Sons of Cayapon: the two children of Lumawig and Fucan; helped the people of Caneo, who afterwards killed by the two brothers
- Batanga: father of the two girls met by Lumawig in Lanao

== Ifugao ==
=== Immortals ===
- Kabunian: supreme deity and chief among the high ranking deities above the skyworld; also referred to as Mah-nongan, chief god generally referred to as the honorary dead and creator of all things; in specific communities, both the names Mah-nongan and Kabunian (also Afunijon) are understood as the name of one chief deity, while in others, they are used to refer to many deities
- Afunijon: also a general term referred to the deities of heaven, which is also called Afunijon
- Mah-nongan: also a general term for deities who are given animal sacrifices
- Ampual: the god of the fourth skyworld who bestowed animals and plants on the people; controls the transplanting of rice
- Bumingi: in charge of worms, one of the eleven beings importuned to stamp out rice pests
- Liddum: the only deity who inhabits the realm called Kabunian; communicates directly with humans on earth; chief mediator between the people and other gods
- Lumadab: has the power to dry up the rice leaves, one of the eleven beings importuned to stamp out rice pests
- Mamiyo: the stretcher of skeins, one of the twenty-three deities presiding over the art of weaving
- Monlolot: the winder of thread on the spindle, one of the twenty-three deities presiding over the art of weaving
- Puwok: controls the dread typhoons
- Yogyog: a causer of earthquakes; dwells in the underworld
- Alyog: a causer of earthquakes; dwells in the underworld
- Kolyog: the god of earthquakes
- Makalun: spirits that serve the function as messengers of the gods
- Namtogan: the paraplegic god of good fortune whose presence made rice harvests and community livestock bountiful; when the humans he was staying with at Ahin began neglecting the bulul, he left, causing a curse of misfortunes; the people persuaded him to return, where he responded by teaching the people how to create bululs and how to do the rituals for the statues, effectively lifting the curse
- Bulol: household divinities that are the souls of departed ancestors; usually depicted as carved wooden statues stored in the rice granary; the ancestral images guard the crops, make the rice harvest plentiful, and protects the rice from pests and thieves and from being too quickly consumed
- Nabulul: spouse of Bugan; a god who possesses or lives in Bulul figures; guards the rice and make the rice harvest plentiful
- Bugan: spouse of Nabulul; a goddess who possesses or lives in Bulul figures; guards the rice and make the rice harvest plentiful
- Gatui: divinities associated with practical jokes, but have a malevolent side that feast on souls and cause miscarriages
- Tagbayan: divinities associated with death that feast on human souls that are guarded by two headed monsters called kikilan
- Imbayan: also called Lingayan; divinities who guide souls after they die
  - Himpugtan: an Imbayan divinity who can terminate those that displease him
- Munduntug: divinities from the mountains who cause hunters to be lost
- Banig: spirits of the hillsides and caves; among the Mayayao, the Banig take in the form of an animal who does not harm anyone, despite the people being afraid of their manifestation
- Mun-apoh: deified ancestral spirits who are guardians and sources of blessings provided by the living; they are respected, however, their blessings could also be turned into a curse
- Mahipnat: great spirits of sacred places
- Bibao: spirits of ordinary places
- Halupi: divinities of remembrance
- Fili: divinities of property
- Dadungut: divinities who dwell in graveyards and tombs
- Makiubaya: divinities who watch over the gates of the village
- Spirits of sickness
  - Libligayu
  - Hibalot
- Binudbud: spirits that are invoked during feasts to quell the passions of men
- Kolkolibag: spirits who cause difficult labor
- Indu: spirits that make omens
- Hidit: divinities who give punishments to those that break taboos
  - Puok: a kind of Hidit who use winds to destroy the dwellings of miners that break taboos
- Hipag: spirits of war that give soldiers courage on the field of war but are ferocious and cannibalistic
- Llokesin: the god of rats who figures in the myth of the first orange tree
- Bumabakal: the rejected corpse divinity of the skyworld; his dead body resides on top of Mount Dukutan, where his bodily fluids cause boils
- Kabigat: the god who sent a deluge which flooded the earth; married to the goddess Bugan
- Bugan: a goddess married to Kabigat; her children are a son named Wigan and a daughter also named Bugan
- Bugan: daughter of Bugan and Kabigat; stranded on earth after the great deluge, and became one of the two ancestors of mankind
- Wigan: son of Bugan and Kabigat; stranded on earth after the great deluge, and became one of the two ancestors of mankind
- Wigan: the god of good harvest
- Dumagid: a god who lived among the people of Benguet; married a mortal woman named Dugai and had a son named Ovug
- Ovug: son of Dumagid and Dugai; was cut in half by his father, where one of his halves was reanimated in the skyworld, and the other on earth; the voice of the skyworld's Ovug is the source of lightning and sharp thunder, while the voice of the earth's Ovug is the source of low thunder
- Bangan: the god who accompanied Dumagid in claiming Ovug from the earth
- Aninitud chalom: deity of the underworld, whose anger is manifested in a sudden shaking of the earth
- Aninitud angachar: deity of the sky world; causes lightning and thunder when unsatisfied with offerings
- Mapatar: the sun deity of the sky in charge of daylight
- Bulan: the moon deity of the night in charge of nighttime
- Mi’lalabi: the star and constellation deities
- Pinacheng: a group or class of deities usually living in caves, stones, creeks, rocks, and in every place; mislead and hide people
- Fulor: a wood carved into an image of a dead person seated on a death chair; an antique which a spirit in it, who bring sickness, death, and unsuccessful crops when sacrifices are not offered
- Inamah: a wooden plate and a home of spirits; destroying or selling it will put the family in danger

=== Mortals ===
- Dugai: the mortal mother of the split god Ovug; wife of the god Dumagid
- Humidhid: the headman of a village in the upstream region of Daya who carved the first bulul statues from the haunted or supernatural tree named Bongbong
- Unnamed Shaman: prayed to the deities, Nabulul and Bugan, to possess or live in the bulul statues carved by Humidhid
- Wife of Namtogan: a mortal woman who the god Namtogan married when he stayed at the village of Ahin

== Kalanguya (Ikalahan) ==
=== Immortals ===
- Kabunyan: the almighty creator; also referred to as Agmattebew, the spirit who could not be seen; the mabaki ritual is held in the deity's honor during planting, harvesting, birth and death of the people, and other activities for livelihood
- Bugan: a deified ancestor who gave her people more than what was due; when she drowned in a lake, the people made a collective action called tinek to save her, leading to the town of Tinoc to be named as such
- Balitok: the deified leader of the Kalanguya; he was the husband of Bugan
- Nangketey: ancestral spirits who are provided a place to reside in by Kabunyan; given offerings for omens
  - Bibiyaw: spirits of ancestors who died a terrible death; live in caves, big rocks, and big trees, and can cause sickness if not appeased
- Kaapuan (general): ancestors
- Tinmongaw: spirits that can also be called Anito; reside within forests
- Mountain Spirits: called upon during events and local feasts for community protection and bountiful harvests
  - Keleng
  - Ibayoh
  - Baki
- Banig: a ghost or spirit

=== Mortals ===
- Dimmangaw: the ancestor who first discovered salt

== Kankanaey ==
=== Immortals ===
- Lumawig: the supreme deity; creator of the universe and preserver of life
- Bugan: married to Lumawig
- Bangan: the goddess of romance; a daughter of Bugan and Lumawig
- Obban: the goddess of reproduction; a daughter of Bugan and Lumawig
- Kabigat: one of the deities who contact mankind through spirits called anito and their ancestral spirits
- Balitok: one of the deities who contact mankind through spirits called anito and their ancestral spirits
- Wigan: one of the deities who contact mankind through spirits called anito and their ancestral spirits
- Timugan: two brothers who took their sankah (handspades) and kayabang (baskets) and dug a hole into the lower world, Aduongan; interrupted by the deity Masaken; one of the two agreed to marry one of Masaken's daughters, but they both went back to earth when the found that the people of Aduongan were cannibals
- Masaken: ruler of the underworld who interrupted the Timugan brothers

== Ibaloi ==
=== Immortals ===
- Kabunian: the supreme deity and the origin of rice; Kabunian is also the general term for deities
- Moon Deity: the deity who teased Kabunian for not yet having a spouse
- Child of Kabunian: the child of Kabunian with a mortal woman; split in half, where one part became lightning and the other became thunder
- Matono: a brave woman who adventured into the underworld and saw the causes of poor crops and earthquakes; she afterwards reported her studies to the people of the earth; during the kosdëy, the people pray to her to not permit the rice, camotes, and other things to grow down, but to cause them to grow up
- Kabigat (of where the water rises): journeyed into the underworld to retrieve trees which became the forests of the middle world
- Kabigat (of where the water empties): taught Kabigat (of where the water empties) how to safely get trees from the underworld
- Masekën: ruler of the underworld with green eyebrows, red eyes, and a tail
- Kabigat (of the east): a large man in the east who adopted Bangan
- Bangan: son of Otot and adopted by Kabigat; a kind young man who loved both his father and foster-father; shared gold to the world though Kabigat
- Otot: a large man in the west who perished due to an accident, while travelling with his son, Bangan; a tree of gold rose from his burial, where Kabunian fell the tree and all gold on earth scattered from it
- Sun God: the deity who pushed up the skyworld and pushed down the underworld, creating earth, after he was hit by a man's arrow during the war between the peoples of the skyworld and the underworld
- Tinmongao: guardian spirits of the mountains, including Mount Pulag

=== Mortals ===
- Labangan: a man who was got the first grain of rice used by mankind from Kabunian
- Wife of Kabunian: the spouse of Kabunian who bore their child, which was split into two and revived into lightning and thunder
- Two Blind Women: two kind blind beggars in hunger who were driven away by their neighbors; fed by a woman who came from a rock and an old woman; one was given a sack or rice, while the other was given a bottle of water; when they returned home, they decided to replant the rice and distribute it to the people, while the bottle of water gushed out streams which also aided mankind

== Bugkalot (Ilongot) ==
=== Immortals ===
- Delan: deity of the moon, worshiped with the sun and stars; congenial with Elag; during quarrels, Elag sometimes covers Delan's face, causing the different phases of the moon; giver of light and growth
- Elag: deity of the sun, worshiped with the moon and stars; has a magnificent house in the sky realm called Gacay; retreats to his home during nights; giver of light and growth
- Pandac: deity of the stars, worshiped with the sun and moon; giver of light and growth
- Cain: the headhunter creator of mankind; gave customs to the people; lived together with Abel in the sky but separated due to a quarrel
- Abel: prayed to when wishing long lives for children; lived together with Cain in the sky but separated due to a quarrel
- Keat: personification of lightning, depicted as the road of Cain and Abel
- Kidu: personification of thunder, which follows Keat
- Gemang: guardian of wild beasts
- Oden: deity of the rain, worshiped for its life-giving waters
- Tawen: personification of the sky
- Kalao: spirit birds; depicted as red hornbills who guide and protect hunters and their soul
- Be’tang: unpredictable shape-shifting spirit-creatures living in the forests or wilderness called Gongot; youth and softness are their properties, while they can also alter a human's sense of time; they may take the form of a white dog, a large deer, a horse with a hanging tongue, a naked woman, or beings with grotesque shapes, whose attributes range from long arms and legs, small heads, oversized feet, fur bodies, to hairless bodies; they may also enter a person's dreams or paralyze a human
- Ga’ek Spirits: spirits in the Ga’ek magic plant used in relation to hunting and fishing; the naw-naw prayer is given to them

== Ilocano ==
=== Immortals ===
- Buni: the supreme being who commanded Parsua and the primordial giants Angalo and Aran to create numerous things that made it possible for mankind to thrive; a mysterious deity who is beyond perceptual capacities of mortals
- Parsua: the creator deity; intermediary to Buni
- Primordial Giants: tasked by Buni to create things
  - Anglao: also called Angalo; dug the earth and made the mountains, urinated into the holes in the earth and made the rivers and lakes, and put up the sky, the sun, the moon, and arranged the stars at the behest of the supreme god
  - Aran: one of the two primordial giants tasked with the creation of many things
- Apo Daga: the divine personification of the breathing living earth
- Apo Langit: the deity of heaven
- Apo Angin: the deity of wind
- Apo Bulan: the deity of the moon; the god of peace who comforted the grieving Abra
- Apo Init: the deity of the sun; also called Amman, the sun itself is said to be his eye
- Apo Tudo: the deity of the rain
- Apo Baybay: the deity of the sea; the goddess of the ocean whose waters slammed the ediface of salt being built by Ang-ngalo and Asin, causing the sea's water to become salty
- Lung-aw: the god of progress whose presence in one's life provides a good life; invoked for good health, strength, and sanity
- Abra: an old god who controls the weather; married to Makiling, the elder
- Makiling (the elder): the goddess gave birth to Cabuyaran
- Cabuyaran: the goddess of healing; daughter of Abra and Makiling, the elder; she eloped with Anianihan
- Anianihan: the god of harvest who eloped with Cabuyaran He was chosen by Cabuyaran as her spouse, instead of her father's preferences such as Saguday, god of wind, or Revenador, god of thunder and lightning
- Saguday: the god of the wind who is one of the two gods preferred by Abra to be his daughter's spouse
- Revenador: the god of thunder and lightning who is one of the two gods preferred by Abra to his daughter's spouse
- Makiling (the younger): granddaughter of Makiling, the elder; she is guarded by the dog god Lobo in the underworld
- Lobo: a god who was punished to become a large dog guarding the entrance to the underworld
- Unnamed God: the underworld god who punished Lobo
- Dal'lang: the goddess of beauty
- Sipnget: the goddess of darkness who requested Ang-ngalo to build her a mansion
- Asin: ruler of the kingdom of salt, who aided Ang-ngalo in the building of a white mansion
- Apolaki: the name of a deity, which later was used to refer to the supreme deity of Christian converts
- Kaibaan: spirits of undergrowth of the forests
- Mangmangkik: spirits of the trees
- Ansisit: the dwarven spirits
- Batibat: spirits of nightmares
- Di Katataoan: evil spirits
- Pugot: dark-skinned headless spirits

=== Mortals ===
- Lam-ang: an epic hero who journeyed to avenge his father and court Ines Kannoyan; aided by the dog and the rooster, and in some versions, the cat as well
- Namongan: mother of Lam-ang
- Don Juan: father of Lam-ang
- Ines Kannoyan: beautiful maiden who became the lover of Lam-ang; aided the resurrection of Lam-ang
- Horned Presidente: a presidente of a town who wished to have horns to frighten the people under his rule and keep them under his control; his wish backfired as the people perceived him as worse than an animal; he continued to demand to be the ruler despite his people withdrawing their support, which eventually led to his death

== Pangasinan/Pangasinense ==
=== Immortals ===
- Ama-Gaolay: the supreme deity; simply referred as Ama, the ruler of others, and the creator of mankind; sees everything through his aerial abode; father of Agueo and Bulan
- Agueo: the morose and taciturn sun god who is obedient to his father, Ama; lives in a palace of light
- Bulan: the merry and mischievous moon god, whose dim palace was the source of the perpetual light which became the stars; guides the ways of thieves
- Apolaqui: a war god; also called Apolaki, his name was later used to refer to the god of Christian converts
- Anito: spirits who lurk everywhere; capable of inflicting pain and suffering, or of granting rewards
- Gods of the Pistay Dayat: gods who are pacified through the Pistay Dayat ritual, where offerings are given to the spirits of the waters who pacify the gods

=== Mortals ===
- Urduja: a warrior princess who headed a supreme fleet
- Rizal: a culture-hero who, according to tradition, will return to aid his people in their struggle for victory and genuine freedom

== Sambalic (including Sambal, Bolinao, Botolan, and others) ==
=== Immortals ===
- Malayari: also called Apo Namalyari, the supreme deity and creator
- Akasi: the god of health and sickness; sometimes seen at the same level of power as Malayari
- Kayamanan: the goddess of wealth in Sambal mythology; with Kainomayan, she aided a farmer by bringing him good fortune, however, the farmer became greedy; as punishment, she transformed the farmer into a swarm of locusts
- Kainomayan: the goddess of plenty
- Deities in Charge of the Rice Harvest
  - Dumangan: god of good harvest
  - Kalasakas: god of early ripening of rice stalks
  - Kalasokus: god of turning grain yellow and dry
  - Damulag: also called Damolag, god of protecting fruiting rice from the elements
- Manglubar: the god of peaceful living
- Mangalagar: the goddess of good grace
- Anitun Tauo: the goddess of wind and rain who was reduced in rank by Malayari for her conceit
- Apolaqui: personal deity of a priestess

== Aeta (Agta, Ayta) ==
=== Immortals ===
- Great Creator: the god who created all things; used to come down and talk to people before the great flood; rules the earth through Tigbalog, Lueve, Amas, and Binangewan
- Gutugutumakkan: the supreme deity, possibly the name of the Great Creator
- Apu Namalyari: a deity who lives in Mount Pinatubo; also called Apo Pinatubo and Apo na Malyari; also referred as the supreme deity
- Tigbalog: gives life and directs activities
- Lueve: directs production and growth
- Amas: moves to pity, love, unity, and peace of heart
- Binangewan: spirits who bring change, sickness, and death as punishment
- Matusalem: the creator's representatives who act as mediators between the creator and humans since after the great flood
- Algao: the sun god who battled Bacobaco
- Bacobaco: an ancient turtle who burrowed on top of Mount Pinatubo after its battle with Algao; eruptions occur when it resurfaces
- Kedes: god of the hunt
- Pawi: god of the forest
- Sedsed: god of the sea

== Kapampangan ==
=== Immortals ===
- Mangetchay: also called Mangatia; the supreme deity who created life on earth in remembrance of his dead daughter; lives in the sun in other versions, she is the creator and net-weaver of the heavens
- Daughter of Mechetchay: a daughter of Mangetchay whose beauty sparked the great war between the gods, leading to the formation of the earth through stones thrown by the deities; lived on the planet Venus
- Wife of Mangetchay: wife of Mangetchay who gave birth to their daughter whose beauty sparked the great war; lives in the moon
- Suku: also called Sinukwan, a gigantic being who radiated positive traits
- Makiling: a goddess who married Suku
- Malagu: goddess of beauty who married a mortal; daughter of Makiling and Suku
- Mahinhin: goddess of modesty who married a mortal; daughter of Makiling and Suku
- Matimtiman: goddess of charm who married a mortal; daughter of Makiling and Suku
- Aring Sinukûan: sun god of war and death, taught the early inhabitants the industry of metallurgy, wood cutting, rice culture and even waging war; lives in Mount Arayat, and later included a female form; rules over Arayat together with the deity, Mingan
- Mingan: a deity who rules with Sinukuan over Arayat, also called Kalaya and Alaya
- Apolaqui: sun god who battled his sister, Mayari
- Mayari: the moon goddess who battled her brother, Apolaqui
- Lakandánup: serpent goddess who comes during total eclipses; followed by famine; eats a person's shadow, which will result in withering and death; daughter of Áring Sínukuan and Dápu
- Apung Iru (Lord of the River) – was depicted as gigantic cosmic crocodile that supported the earth on its back, and was located under the great World River. If angered, Apung Iru caused the rivers to flood; hence, this is the origin of libad or the water procession during the full moon nearest to the summer solstice, which takes place in the yearly celebration called Bayung Danum (New Water) to appease the deity.
- Dápu: crocodile deity who holds the earth on her back; a nunu or earth goddess, and known as the mother ocean
- Láwû: a giant creature similar to a mixture of a bird, a serpent, and a crocodile who seeks to swallow Aldó and Búlan; the soul of Dápu who does her bidding as Dápu has been weakened when her belly burst; in another, less common, version, Láwû is the ghost of Dápu; while in another, Láwû is the descendant of Dápu, seeking revenge for the deity's mother
- Batálâ : kingfisher deity, known as the father sky; known as Salaksak, he was swallowed by Dápu, where he dissolved and his two souls came out, bursting out of Dápu's belly
- Souls of Batálâ
  - Aldó: the white fiery bird
  - Búlan: the red fiery bird
- Rizal: a culture-hero who will return through resurrection to aid his people in their struggle
- Felipe Salvador: a hero who will someday return to the people to help them in their struggle; based on a historical person

=== Mortals ===
- Piriang: a prideful maiden who would rather marry a demon than a poor man
- Guanchiango: a man who was deceived by a demon, who he released from a jar

== Tagalog ==
=== Ancient Tagalog deities documented by the Spaniards ===
- Arao (Araw = sun) – According to Juan de Plasencia, the ancient Tagalogs worshiped the sun on account of its beauty. When it rains with sunshine and the sky is somewhat red, they say that the anitos get together to give them war. And they are, and with great fear, and neither women nor children allow them to come down from the houses, until it clears and the sky becomes clear. During solar eclipse (limlim), the sun was said to cover its face, no special ceremony is reported unlike in the case of lunar eclipse.
- Alagaca (Alagaka) – The protector of hunters.
- Alpriapo (The priapus) – An idol mentioned by an anonymous contemporary of Plasencia: "They worshiped idols which were called Alpriapo, Lacapati, and Meilupa, but God has, in His goodness, enlightened them with the grace of His divine gospel, and they worship the living God in spirit." The Spanish term Alpriapo "the priapus" is left untranslated. Apparently the Spanish chronicler did not know the Tagalog name of this deity. They could be referring to Dian Masalanta.
- Amanicable (Ama-ni-Kable = father of Kable) – The advocate and protector of hunters. In ancient Tagalog customs, the first son or daughter gave the surname to the parents, e.g. Amani Maliuag, Ynani Malacas, "the father of Maliuag," "the mother of Malacas." Therefore, Amanicable could be the surname of either Paglingñalan or Alagaca or both if they are identical.
- Amansinaya (Amang Sinaya = father of Sinaya) – The advocate of fishermen, who is said to be the inventor of fishing gear. Before casting their nets or fishing lines, the fishermen would first whistle and then pray to Amansinaya saying, "Kasumpa ako, naway diriyan" which meant "I am your sworn friend, let it be there", in reference to the fish. According to San Buenaventura dictionary (1613), the meaning of Amansinaya is "Father of sinaya" (Padre de sinaya). In ancient Tagalog customs, the first son or daughter gave the surname to the parents, e.g. Amani Maliuag, Ynani Malacas, "the father of Maliuag," "the mother of Malacas." The connector "ni" could be replaced by the linker, e.g. <Amang Juan> Amáñg Suwáñ (Mag. 1679:3) "Juan's father". The term sinaya means "the first catch of a fishnet, fishtrap, or a hunting dog". Pasinaya is a term used as an invitation to share a first catch. According to Francisco Colin, fishermen would not make use of the first cast of the net or a new fish-corral, for they thought that they would get no more fish if they did the opposite. Neither must one talk in the fisherman's house of his new nets, or in that of the hunter of dogs recently purchased, until they had made a capture or had some good luck; for if they did not observe that, the virtue was taken from the nets and the cunning from the dogs.
- Badhala Catotobo (Bathala katutubo = fellow native/conborn bathala) – A sort of twin spirit called katutubo "fellow native" was born along with a person, and was in charge of protecting them during all their life. Catholic missionaries will use the term to refer to the guardian angel.
- Balacbac (Balakbák) & Balantáy – The two guardians of Tanguban: the abode of the souls of the dead. Tanguban is divided into two regions: one is Maca or "kasanáan ng tuwa" ("a thousand joys") where the good souls temporarily stays pending resurrection; and the other is the "kasanáan ng hírap" ("a thousand pains") or simply Casanáan (Kasanáan), where the souls of the wicked went, which is said to be inhabited by devils called sitan. In classical Tagalog, the term sánà could either mean "abundance" or "destruction". It is possible that the term sánà "abundance" was borrowed from Arabic jannaţ "garden, paradise"; while the term sánà "destruction" was borrowed from Arabic jahannam "hell". The soul was said to be ferried on a boat by a Charon-like figure to the other shore (ibáyo) of an expanse of water now regarded as a wide river (ílog), now as a lake or a sea (dágat). The other world is probably deemed to be located where the sun was supposed to drown (lunod) every evening, hence tha name for the west kanlunúran > kanlúran.
- Balangao/Balangau (Balangaw = rainbow) – According to Francisco Colin, the ancient Tagalogs attributed to the rainbow its kind of divinity. Colin also states " that the bird Tigmamanuquin derived its interpretation as a divinity from the rainbow." The rainbow was regarded as a divine sign and it is considered blasphemy to point finger at it. The rainbow was believed to be either Bathala's bridge (balaghari) or loincloth (bahaghari). The souls of those who: perished by the sword, were devoured by crocodiles or sharks, and killed by lightning; immediately ascends to Kaluwálhatian (glory) by means of the rainbow (balangaw) In classical Tagalog the proper name for the rainbow is Balangaw, while bahaghari was only a poetic term referring to Balangaw. Other terms for rainbow are balantok and bahagsubay. The rainbow is sometimes referred to as bathala or badhala, a title also attributed to heavenly bodies which predicted events. This deity should not be confused with Varangao (Barangaw) the Visayan god of rainbow, war, and plundering expedition.
- Balátic ("the Crossbow : the Eagle, a constellation of three stars near the celestial equator, called Marineras or Tres Marías in Renaissance Spanish")
- Balo - The anitos that haunts deserted places [otros anitos de los despoblados].
- Bathala mei Capal (Bathala Maykapal = God the Creator) – The transcendent supreme being: the creator and ruler of the universe. Known under several names, titles, and epithets such as: Anatala, Molayare (Mulayari = source/origin of power/being), Dioata (Diwata = divinity/remote/very distant), Meylupa (Maylupa = owner of the earth), etc. He had many agents under him, whom he sent to this world to produce, in behalf of men, what is yielded here. These beings were called anitos (ancestral spirits), and each anito had a special office. Some of them were for the fields, and some for those who journey by sea; some for those who went to war, and some for diseases. The term "bathala" is a title attributed not only to the supreme being but also to personal tutelary anitos (Badhala catotobo), omen birds (Tigmamanuquin), the mountain which is the abode of Tigmamanuquin, comets and other heavenly bodies which the early Tagalog people believed predicted events. For this reason, some Spanish chroniclers had been lost in their account about Bathala Maykapal and promptly asserted that he is an alligator, a crow, a bird called tigmamanukin, a rainbow, etc. In modern context, the term Bathala can be used to refer to the Christian God.
- Bibit – Generally diseases are attributed to a deity called Bibit. A strange belief because the deity is not presented as a malevolent one, but as being sick itself. If someone was sick they would make offerings of food to Bibit because the catalona had first to cure the deity before they were able to act as a physician and for the patient to recover.
- Bingsól – The advocate of ploughmen.
- Bisô (Holeless-Eared) – The police officer of heaven.
- Boking/Bokong – an anito.
- Buan (Buwan = moon) – According to the Spanish chroniclers the ancient Tagalogs revered the moon (Buwan) as a deity, especially when it was new (the first sliver of the moon), at which time they held great rejoicings, adoring it and bidding it welcome, asking it to provide them with a lot of gold; others for a lot of rice; others that it give them a beautiful wife or a noble husband who is well-mannered and rich; others that it bestow on them health and long life; in short, everyone asks for what they most desire because they believe and are convinced it can give it to them abundantly. San Buenaventura dictionary lists a prayer dedicated to the moon that was recited during the new moon: "Buwáñg Panginóon kó, payamánin mó akó" which translates to "Moon, my Lord/Lady, make me rich." When one is on a mission no matter how important, it is well to desist from accomplishing the mission if a lunar eclipse occurs. A ring which appears around the moon is an indication of the demise of some chief. In these cases, the moon is referred to as bathala a title attributed to heavenly bodies which the early Tagalog people believed predicted events. Another name for the moon or the proper name for the anito of the moon is Colalaiyng {N&S 1754: 151-152: Colalaiyng. pc. Asi llamaban á la luna, ó á una doncella en la luna, segun sus consejas.}. The Tagalogs from Laguna called her "Dalágañg nása Buwán" (Maiden in the Moon), in reference to the image formed by the shadow on the moon, which they see as a face (sangmukti) of a young maid (doncella). Ceremonies of her cult were regularly performed at the new moon and the full moon with offerings of roosters made to fly in her direction. She was also referred to as "Dalágañg Binúbúkot" (Cloistered Maiden). In ancient Tagalog society, some virgins were cloistered like nuns or as amongst Muslims, the term used to refer to them were binúkot (SB 1613:279; N&S 1860:266) and kinalî (N&S 1860:266; Pang. 1972:287). The reason for this custom is not explained, but may have been a Muslim one.ColalaiyngKulalaying = Jew's harp
- Bulac-pandan (Búlak Pandán = Flower of Pandan)
- Bulactala (Búlak Tálà = "Flower of Tala" i.e. the planet Venus) – The anito of the planet Venus (tala).
- Capiso Pabalita (Kapiso Pabalítà = News-giving) – The protector of travelers.
- Cirit/Zirit (Sirit = Snake's hiss) – A servant of the anitos.
- Dian Masalanta (Diyan Masalanta = the blind deity; the devastating deity) – The advocate of lovers and of generation (procreation). The meaning of the name Dian Masalanta is not provided, but according to the author Jean-Paul G. Potet (Ancient Beliefs and Customs of the Tagalogs, 2018) the meaning could be "the blind deity" [dian "deity", ma – "adj. prefic" + salanta "blindness"]. Masalanta (devastating) comes from the root word salanta, which in the Noceda and Sanlucar Vocabulario de la lengua Tagala (1754)" and the San Buenaventura dictionary (1613) lists the meaning as "poor, needy, crippled, and blind". Generally, magsalanta and nasalanta, which means "is destroyed/devastated", is used when there is a calamity such as: a typhoon, flood, or earthquake. Therefore, Dian Masalanta could also mean "devastating deity".
- Dingali – A particular type of family-anitos.
- Guinarawan (Ginarawan) – an evil spirit.
- Guinoong Dalaga (Ginúoñg Dalága= lady maiden) – The anito of the crops.
- Guinoong Ganay (Ginúoñg Gánay = lady old maid) – According to Luciano P. R. Santiago, Guinoong Ganay is the advocate of single women that inhabit the Calumpang tree.
- Guinoong Panay (Ginúoñg Panáy = lady "syzygium/tuffy"?) – the anito of kalumpang tree (Sterculia foetida).
- Guinoong Pagsohotan (Ginúoñg Pagsuotán = clothing lady) – The protectress of women in travail.
- Hasangan (Hasanggán) – A terrible anito.
- Húya/Tumanor (Tumanod = warden) – an ill-famed idol that crept under houses. On hearing it, people threw ashes, and struck the floor while saying: "Iri-iri ya, si Húya!" (SB 1613:36) [= "Take that, Huya!"] – his name is apparently assimilated to the (marriage) pancake called madhúyà (marúyà) and the ashes being a parody for flour.
- Ídianale (Í-diyanale = mother of Diyánale) – Lacapati and Ídianale were the patrons of cultivated lands and of husbandry. In ancient Tagalog customs, the first son or daughter gave the surname to the parents, e.g. Amani Maliuag, Ynani Malacas, "the father of Maliuag," "the mother of Malacas." Amá and iná could be respectively reduced to a- and i- and used as prefixes (probably stressed) to the child's name, e.g. Á-Pálad "Palad's father", Í-Pálad "Palad's mother". Therefore, Ídianale is a surname of a female anito.
- Lacambini/Lacandaytan (Lakambini = calm/repose/modest lord; Lakang Daitan = lord of attachment) – The protector of the throat, and the advocate in case of throat ailment. Some author wrongly transcribed his name as Lacambui, and according to them he is the god of the ancient Tagalogs who fed. Isabelo de los Reyes also referred to this anito as Lakan-busog and equates him with the Visayan diwata named Makabosog; and the kibaan of Ilocanos that gives his friend a pot that produces all kinds of food. The Tagalog title "laka" (lakan) come from Java "raka" "lord" found in the Kalasan inscription dated S'ka 700/22 March 779 (Juan Francisco 1971:151) [Potet, T customs, 37]. According to Francisco Colin (1663), the title "Lacan or Gat" is the equivalent to the Spanish "Don", and that the Don (Doña) of women is not Lacan or Gat but "Dayang". This indicate that the gender of this anito is "male". In contemporary Tagalog Dictionaries, the meaning of this term is given as "a muse, a charming beautiful lady".
- La Campinay (Lakampinay) – The Old Midwife. The Tagalog title "laka" (lakan) come from Java "raka" "lord" found in the Kalasan inscription dated S'ka 700/22 March 779 (Juan Francisco 1971:151). According to Francisco Colin (1663), the title "Lacan or Gat" is the equivalent to the Spanish "Don", and that the Don (Doña) of women is not Lacan or Gat but "Dayang". This indicates that La Campinay is a "male midwife", which is not uncommon in southeast Asia.
- Lacan Balingasay (Lakang Balingasay) – Father Juan de Oliver in his Declaracion de la Doctrina Christiana en idioma tagalog (1599). While preaching in Batangas, he mentioned Lakan Balingasay and compared him to Beelzebub: "malaking anito ang pangalang Belzebu, na kun baga dito Lakan Balingasay." Balingasay is a wood derived from Buchanania arborescens, a type of fruit bearing species that is commonly found in Luzon.
- Lacapati (Lakapati, from Sanskrit Locapati = Lord of the world) – The major fertility deity, fittingly represented by an image of a man and a woman joined (androgyne) that signifies the procreative power of heterosexual union. He was the advocate of sowed fields, of husbandry, and of vagrants and waifs. Sacrifices of food and words are made to him by the ancient Tagalogs, asking for water for their fields and for him to give them fish when they go fishing in the sea, saying if they do not do this, they would have no water for their field and much less would they catch any fish when they go fishing. During rituals and offerings—known as maganito—in the fields and during the planting season, farmers would hold a child up in the air while invoking Lakapati and chant "Lakapati, pakanin mo yaring alipin mo; huwag mo gutumin." (Translation: Lakapati, feed this thy slave; let him not hunger). Other authors described him as a hemaphrodite devil who satisfies his carnal appetite with men and women. This could be a misinterpretation of Lacapati's relation to the catalonas (shamans). In Ngaju Dayak religion, the shaman's altered state of consciousness is likened to male/female sexual intercourse: the shaman work in an embodiment transtate that is considered feminine or receptive; the deity, is considered masculine or the dynamic, entering force. Unlike the name "Lacambini" (Lakambini) or Lacan Baliñgasay (Lakang Balingasay), the linker (e.g. m, ng, n) between laka and pati is not used because this name has a different origin: Sanskrit loka-pati = "lord of the world" (an epithet of "Brahman the Creator" and "Vishnu the Preserver"); Sans. loka = location, the earth, field + Sans. pati = lord.
- Lachanbacor (Lakhang Bakod = lacquered fence) – An ithyphallic deity. The anito of the fruits of the earth and protector of swiddens. His image or wooden statue is described as having gold eyes and teeth and a gilded genitalia as long as a rice stalk; its body is completely hollow. When the people needed his help, they hold a banquet and revel in the fields under a canopy that they construct there for this purpose and where they erect a kind of altar. On this altar they place his wooden statue. And those making the sacrifice form a ring and eat and feast. And they have the priests (catalona) place some of the food they are to eat in the mouth of the statue; they also give him some of the beverage they are to drink. And they are convinced that by reciting some superstitious words he will give them the very good and abundant fruits asked of him. He was offered eels when fencing swiddens—because, they said, his were the strongest of all fences, "linalachan niya ang bacor nang bucqir" ("He lacquered the fences of the field"). Lacha (Lakha) means "red lacquer". Some authors say he is the god who cured diseases, for this reason Isabelo de los Reyes compared him with the kibaans of Ilocanos that nests in the plants that serve as fences (living fences) and cured illnesses.
- Laho (from the Asura named Rahu) – The serpent or dragon who was believed to devour the moon and cause lunar eclipse. When the moon is eclipsed, the people of various districts generally go out into the street or into the open fields, with bells, panastanes, etc. They strike them with great force and violence in order that they might thereby protect the moon which they say is being eaten or swallowed by the dragon, tiger, or crocodile. If they wish to say "the eclipse of the moon" it is very common among them to use this locution, saying "Linamon laho bovan" ("Laho is swallowing the moon"). The Spaniards believed that the Tagalogs learned this practice from the Sangley (Chinese).
- Lampinsaca (Lampinsákà = cripple) – The advocate of the lame and the cripple.
- Linğa (Linggá = from Sanskrit "lingam", the phallic symbol of the Hindu god "Shiva the Destroyer") – The anito who was invoked in case of sickness. Like his contemporaries, the Spanish lexicographer who recorded this term did not have the necessary knowledge to identify it. In early Sanskrit medical texts, linga means "symptom, signs" and plays a key role in the diagnosis of a sickness, the disease.
- Macapulao (Makapúlaw = watcher) – The advocate of sailors.
- Macatalubhay (Makatalubháy) – The anito of bananas.
- Mancocotor (Mangkukutud) – The advocate of manunuba (tuba tappers/coconut wine makers) and protector of coconut palm trees. Offering is made to him by the manunubas before climbing a tree, lest they ran the risk of a fall from the trunk.
- Magináong Sungmásandāl (Maginúoñg Sungmásandāl = Lord "the one that keeps close")
- Maguinoong Campongan (Maginúoñg Kampungán = lord supporter) – The anito of harvest and sown fields.
- Mapolon (Mapúlon = Pleiades)
- Quinon sana (Kinunsánà) – The name of the supreme deity among mountaineers (Boxer 2016:66/67). Schol. This is an -in-derivative of *kunsánà, itself a kun- derivative of sánà "abundance". The prefix kun- is also found in wárì "opinion" < kunwárì "fake". The god of the fields and of the jungles to whom sacrifices of food are made by the priests called catalona, beseeching him to do them no harm or injury while they are in their fields or the jungle. They perform this sacrifice and hold this banquet for him in order to keep him satisfied and benevolent. The Tagalogs should have no native word for 'forest' is no less surprising than their lack of terms for 'volcano' and 'lava'. ZORC (1993) is of the opinion that there must have existed native Tagalog terms, and that they disappeared from the language because they were taboo: uttering them would have called the attention of the corresponding wrathful gods.
- Paalolong (Paalúlong = barker) – The advocate of the sick and the dead.
- Paglingñalan (Paglingniyalán) – The advocate of hunters.
- Pagvaagan (Pagwaagán) – the anito of the winds.
- Pilipit (Spiral) – the ancient Tagalogs swear their oaths to a statuette of a deity or monstrous beast, they called Pilipit, that would devour a perjurer. San Buenaventura (1613:369) describes the Pilipit as a devil figure; a ceramic cat apparently made in China. The oath could also be taken on a substitute – a snail bearing the same name, both having a twisted appearance. According to Francisco Colin, when the chiefs of Manila and Tondo swore allegiance to the Catholic sovereigns, in the year one thousand five hundred and seventy-one, they confirmed the peace agreements and the subjection with an oath, asking "the sun to pierce them through the middle, the crocodiles to eat them, and the women not to show them any favor or wish them well, if they broke their word." Sometimes they performed the pasambahan for greater solemnity and confirmation of the oath. That consisted in bringing forward the figure of some monstrous beast asking that they might be broken into pieces by it if they failed in their promise. According to Father Noceda and Blumentritt, the Tagalogs called Pasambahan the place where they took oath before the figure of a very ugly animal.
- Posor-lupa (Púsod-Lúpā = earth navel) – the anito of the fields.
- Sayc (Sayik, from Arabic shaykh = sheikh. This name was wrongly transcribed as Hayc in the English translation of the Boxer Codex.) – The anito of the sea. Seamen before they set sail sponsored a major ceremony (maganito) wherein sacrifices of banquets and food are offered to him, through a catalona, asking him to protect them from tempests and storms when traveling by sea, and to grant them good weather and favorable calm winds.
- Siac Matanda (Siyák Matandâ = old sheikh) – The advocate of merchants and second-hand dealers.
- Siukuy (Siyokoy = from Chinese Mandarin "shuǐguǐ" which means "water ghost") – the anito of the rivers [Era el dios de los ríos de los tágalos antiguos]. In modern Tagalog folklore, siyokoy are sea monsters, an anthropoid whose body is covered in glistening brown or green fish scales and webbet feet; some description also give them long, green tentacles and gill slits; they drown fishermen and consume them for food.
- Tala (the planet Venus)
- Tauong Damo (Tawong Damo) – Wicked anitos or savaged mountain gods believed to be responsible for the abortion. According to Blumentritt, the anitos that inspired so much fear among the Tagalogs, such as those that lived in the forest, seem to be the anitos of the old owners or natives of the regions that was occupied by the immigrant Tagalogs. Linguists such as David Zorc and Robert Blust speculate that the Tagalogs and other Central Philippine ethno-linguistic groups originated in Northeastern Mindanao or the Eastern Visayas.
- The first midwife in the world – An unnamed deity, mentioned in the Boxer Codex (1590), called "the first midwife in the world"; to whom the midwives, when they do their job, prayed to saying: "Oh you, first midwife, whose office I now do by your will, please give me so that through my help this creature may come to light ". They could be referring to Lacampinay, the old midwife.
- Unnamed anito of the house – whose favor they implored whenever an infant was born, and when it was suckled and the breast offered to it.
- Unnamed ferryman of the dead – The ancient Tagalogs believed that when a man died, his soul was obliged to pass a river or lake where there was a boat rowed by an old boatman; and to pay his passage they fastened some money on the arm of the dead man (Aduarte 1640). The unnamed ferryman could be Paalolong, the god of the sick and of the dead.
- Unnamed husband-and-wife deities – In the Pardo inquisition report (1686), the inquisitor found bamboo goblets, pebbles, and skeins of hair, and a one-piece stone statue representing husband-and-wife deities.
- Unnamed serpent deity – The priestesses and her acolytes of the town of Santo Tomas, Laguna de Bay, interrogated by the Dominican inquisitors from the University of Santo Tomas, Manila, answered that, when they performed a ceremony in a cave, used as a temple, a deity would appear to them in the shape of a python (sawa). Usually, it is reported that the spirit—whether that of a deity or an ancestor—took the form of a shadow (aníno) to enter the body of the shaman. The sound of a flute was heard when the spirit was present (Boxer 2016:82/83). In their dreams, the shaman saw these spirits as a black man (itím na laláki) or a wild water buffalo (anwáng). Similarly, a mountain spirit called tigbálang was perceived as a black ghost, hence Anáki'ý ikáw ay tigbálang "You look like a mountain spirit." Said to a person dressed in black attires. The spirit appearing as a python to the congregation is an exception.

=== Tagalog pantheon by F. Landa Jocano ===
- Bathala or Abba – The highest ranking deity and creator of all things. He had three daughters to a mortal wife – Mayari, Hana, and Tala. In classical Tagalog, the term "bathala" is a title attributed not only to the supreme being but also to personal tutelary anitos (Badhala catotobo), omen birds (Tigmamanuquin), the mountain which is the abode of Tigmamanuquin (Tigmamanukin), comets and other heavenly bodies which the early Tagalog people believed predicted events. Abba is the name of the god in the sky worshipped by the people of Limasawa.
- Idianali or Idianale – The goddess of labor and good deeds. Wife of Dumangan, mother of Dumakulem.
- Dumangan – The god of good harvest. Husband of Idianali, father of Dumakulem. Dumangan is the Sambal god of harvest and giver of grain.
- Amanikabli – The husky, ill-tempered ruler of the sea. He is the syncretization of Amanikable (the anito of hunters) and Kablay, a rich, old man in Zambales legend who owned several fishing boats. In this legend, Kablay refused to give alms to a spirit of the sea in the guise of an old beggar man. For his punishment he was transformed into a shark.
- Dumakulem – A strong, agile hunter who became the guardian of created mountains. Son of Idianali and Dumangan. He was derived from Domakolen, the god of the Bagobos who created mountains.
- Anitun Tabu – The fickle-minded goddess of the wind and rain. She was derived from the Sambal deity Anitun Tauo.
- Mayari – The goddess of the moon. Daughter of Bathala to a mortal wife. She was derived from the Kapampangan lunar goddess of the same name. Mayari could also be derived from the Sambal deity Malayari.
- Hana – The goddess of the morning. Daughter of Bathala to a mortal wife. She was derived from Hanan a Visayan hero god who gave the morning dawn.
- Tala – The goddess of the stars. Daughter of Bathala to a mortal wife.
- Ikapati – The goddess of cultivated land. Wife of Mapulon, mother of Anagolay. She was derived from the Sambal goddess of the same name. The Tagalog deity Lacapati was first documented in the Boxer Codex (1590) as possibly male, whose pronoun are he/him. Then as a "figure of man and woman joined together" (androgyne) in Vocabulario de la lengua tagala (1613).
- Mapulon – The god of season. Husband of Ikapati, father of Anagolay.
- Anagolay – The goddess of loss things. Wife of Dumakulem, mother of Apolaki and Dian Masalanta. Possibly derived from either Anagaoley, the supreme god of the ancient Pangasineses; or Amanolay, a god of the Gaddanes.
- Apolaki – The god of the sun and patron of fighters. Son of Dumakulem and Anagolay, brother of Dian Masalanta. Apolaki is the supreme god of the ancient Pangasinenses whom they also referred to as Anagaoley or Amagaoley (Supreme Father). In Kapampangan mythology, he is a son of Bathala and brother of Mayari. The Bolinao manuscript mentions the Sambal priestess Bolindauan in 1684 who has Apolaqui as her patron anito.
- Dian Masalanta – The goddess of lovers. Daughter of Dumakulem and Anagolay, sister of Apolaki.
- Sitan – The chief deity of Kasanaan: the village of grief and affliction. He was assisted by many mortal agents such as: Mangagauay, Manisilat, Mankukulam, Hukluban. Sitan is mentioned by Juan de Plasencia in Customs of the Tagalogs (1589) as "devils" inhabiting the Casanaan (hell).
- Agents of Sitan:
  - Mangagauay – The one responsible for the occurrence of diseases. Mentioned by Juan de Plasencia in "Customs of the Tagalogs" (1589) as a type of witch or class of priest.
  - Manisilat – The goddess of broken homes. Mentioned by Juan de Plasencia in "Customs of the Tagalogs" (1589) as a type of witch or class of priest.
  - Mankukulam – Who often assumes human form and went around the villages, pretending to be a priest-doctor. Then he would wallow in the filth beneath the house of his victim and emit fire. If the fire was extinguished immediately, the victim would die. Mentioned by Juan de Plasencia in "Customs of the Tagalogs" (1589) as a type of witch or class of priest.
  - Hukluban – She had the power to change herself into any form she desired. She could kill anyone by simply raising her hand. However, if she wanted to heal those whom she had made ill by her charms, she could do so without any difficulty. It was also said of her that she could destroy a house by merely saying that she would do so. Mentioned by Juan de Plasencia in "Customs of the Tagalogs" (1589) as a type of witch or class of priest. Among the peasants of the province of Bulacan, Hokloban was a wise old man, almost a magician, who was consulted, and who came to an extremely advanced age, thus being a kind of Methuselah of the Tagalogs. The phrase "matandang Hokloban" (old Hokloban) that applies to the long-lived is still very common.
- Priestly agents of the environmental gods:
  - Silagan – Whose duty was to tempt people and to eat the liver of all those who wear white clothes during mourning and take their souls down to the depth of Kasanaan. Had a sister named Mananangal. Mentioned by Juan de Plasencia in "Customs of the Tagalogs" (1589) as a type of witch or class of priest.
  - Mananangal – Could be seen walking along dark trails and lonely paths without her head, hands or feet, because her work was to frighten people to death. Mentioned by Juan de Plasencia in "Customs of the Tagalogs" (1589) as a type of witch or class of priest.
  - Asuan – Who fly at night, murder men, eat their flesh and drink their blood. He has four brothers: Mangagayuma, Sunat, Pangatahuyan, Bayugin. Mentioned by Juan de Plasencia in "Customs of the Tagalogs" (1589) as a type of witch or class of priest.
  - Mangagayuma – Specialized in charms which, when used by lovers, had the power to infused the heart with love. Mentioned by Juan de Plasencia in "Customs of the Tagalogs" (1589) as a type of witch or class of priest.
  - Sunat – A well-known priest. Brother of Asuan. Mentioned by Juan de Plasencia in "Customs of the Tagalogs" (1589) as a type of witch or class of priest. According to Plasencia, a sonat is a high priest/priestess equivalent of that of a Bishop. In classical Tagalog, sonat also signified circumcision, it alluded to the ritual of circumcision of Filipino girls upon coming of age by the chief priestess. In suppressing the priestesses, the missionaries unwittingly made one of their greatest contributions to the welfare of Filipino women: the abolition of what is now known as "female genital mutilation" which, unfortunately, still survives in other developing countries.
  - Pangatahuyan – a soothsayer. Mentioned by Juan de Plasencia in "Customs of the Tagalogs" (1589) as a type of witch or class of priest.
  - Bayuguin – Whose work was to tempt women into a life of shame (prostitution). Mentioned by Juan de Plasencia in "Customs of the Tagalogs" (1589) as a type of witch or class of priest. Bayoguin (Bayogin) or Bayog are transgender and transvestite priests or shaman of the indigenous religion of the ancient Tagalogs.

=== Anting-anting pantheon ===
- Infinito Dios - The highest god and the oldest being from whom everything emanated. The virtue (Birtud/Galing) residing in and empowering the anting-anting and agimat (amulets and talismans). He is also referred to as Nuno (Ancient One, earth deity), Animasola (Lonely Soul, air deity), Waksim (As water deity), and Atardar (His warrior or protective aspect). He is identified to Bathala Maykapal.
- Infinita Dios - The female aspect of the Divine. She is said to be the first emanation of the Infinito Dios who sprang forth from his mind when he decided to have someone help him in his task of creation. She is also referred to as Maria (which stands for: Maris, Amantisimo, Rexsum, Imperator, Altisima), Gumamela Celis (Flower of Heaven), Rosa Mundi (Flower of the World), and Dios Ina (God the Mother); she is also identified with Inang Pilipinas (Mother Philippines) or Inang Bayan (Motherland) similar to Ibu Pertiwi of Indonesia.
- The first two elders (nuno) who reside in the two corners of the Earth and are the guardians of the Sun and the Moon:
  - UPH MADAC - She is the first spirit of the twenty-four Ancianos, except for guarding the first hour after midnight. She designed the Sun in accordance with the task given to her by the Infinito Dios. She made many designs and presented them to her companions and to the Lord, and they chose and all agreed on the shape or appearance of the sun which gives light to the world from then until now and into the future.
  - ABO NATAC - He is the second spirit, who designed the Moon which gives us light during the night. He did the same, many were also created and these were presented to his companions and to the Infinito Dios, and they agreed on the shape of the moon that is present today.
- The following six spirits do not receive any other office. What they did was just wander out into the world, and be God's watchmen:
  - ELIM – The watchman from 3 a.m. to 3:59 AM.
  - BORIM – The watchman from 4:00 AM to 4:59 AM.
  - MORIM – The watchman from 5:00 AM to 5:59 AM.
  - BICAIRIM – The watchman from 6:00 AM to 6:59 AM.
  - PERSALUTIM - The watchman from 7:00 AM to 7:59 AM.
  - MITIM - The watchman from 8:00 AM to 8:59 AM.
- The Siete Arkanghelis:
  - AMALEY - He is the president and first minister of the archangel warriors. He is San Miguel Arcanghel, on his shoulders rests the fight against the wicked to have security on earth and in heaven. San Miguel is assigned as the watchman from 9:00 AM to 9:59 AM on each day, he is also the watchman on the first day of each week, which is Sunday, so he is the one to call on these days to avoid any disasters or events that do not occur. He is also the spirit messenger and messenger of the Infinito Dios throughout the heavens.
  - ALPACOR – He is the one made secretary by the Siete Arkanghelis of the whole universe, he is San Gabriel who is the recorder of all the hidden wonders in the whole universe and galaxy. San Gabriel is the watchman from 10:00 AM to 10:59 AM of each day, He is also the watchman every Monday, therefore it is good to call him on this day to be saved from all disasters .
  - AMACOR - He is the prince of the angelic justice and also the giver of heavenly grace for which he is also the Butler of the Infinito Dios. This angel is well known by the name San Rafael, he is the watchman at 11:00 AM of each day and of Tuesdays. He is the one to be called on these days for salvation from calamities.
  - APALCO - He is the angel who was made Justicia mayor in heaven. Chief Ruler of heavenly things and recommender to God of the punishment to be inflicted, he is also the giver of wisdom to be used by the soul and earthly body of man. This angel is identified as San Uriel who is assigned to watch at 12 noon and he is also the watchman on Wednesdays, so he must be called on this day to be saved from any disaster.
  - ALCO - This is the spirit that offers or prays to God of any good work of man, he is also the receiver and informer of human needs, regarding God. This angel is San Seatiel who is the watchman on Thursdays and the time of the first hour of the afternoon of each day, so he should be the one to be called on these days:
  - ARACO - This is the spirit who was made the keeper of treasures and graces. He holds the key to giving the riches and glory of God. This angel is San Judiel, the benefactor and giver of God's mercy. He is also the assigned watchman on Fridays, so he should be the one to be called on these days.
  - AZARAGUE - This is the guardian spirit of Heaven and Earth, and he is the helper and protector of all spirits under the Infinito Dios. He is San Baraquiel the watchman at 3 pm of each day and is also assigned as the watchman of every Saturdays, so he is the one to be called on these days. San Baraquiel is the last of the Seven Archangels to be known as the seven warriors of God the Father.
- LUXBEL – He is the youngest of the 16 spirits first created by the Infinito Dios. His name means "Light of Heaven" because he is the closest to God. When God began his creation, he was baptized with the name BECCA, but he disobeyed the Infinito Dios so he renamed him LUXQUER or LUCIFER. The history of Luxbel can be found in a book entitled DIEZ MUNDOS (Ten Planets). In this book you will find various types of illicit wisdom such as hexes (kulam), glamour (malik mata), philters (gayuma) and many more. Anyone is discouraged to have a copy of this book because it is the cause of unforgivable sin to the Lord.
- The following five spirits were not baptized and did not accept the calling. When the Lord Jesus Christ was currently hanging on the cross, they came to be baptized, but it did not happen because at that time our Lord Jesus died. They are:
  - ISTAC - The watchman from 5:00 PM to 5:59 PM.
  - INATAC - The watchman from 6:00 PM to 6:59 PM.
  - ISLALAO - The watchman from 7:00 PM to 7:59 PM.
  - TARTARAO - The watchman from 8:00 PM to 8:59 PM.
  - SARAPAO - The watchman from 9:00 PM to 9:59 PM.
- The last three are the Santisima Trinidad, to whom the Infinito Dios gave authority to create the world and its inhabitants.:
  - MAGUGAB - This spirit presents himself as Dios Ama (God the Father), who some say is the first person of the Santisima Trinidad. But as Dios Ama, he is not the Infinito Dios, but only given him the right and duty to identify himself as God the Father. He was given the design of the world and all its contents such as the various types of flying creatures in the air or those crawling on the ground, especially man. He is the watchman from 9:00 PM to 9:59 PM.
  - MARIAGUB - This spirit is the second person in the Santisima Trinidad, he has the fullness of Dios Anak (God the Son) and the power to fulfill the mysteries wrought by the Lord Jesus Christ. He is the spirit who incarnates in order to save those who receive and believe in him. This spirit is the one who, in every age, enters the body of the people commanded by God, which was then called the "Lamb of God." He is the watchman from 10:00 PM to 10:59 PM.
  - MAGUB - This is the third person of the Santisima Trinidad as the Espiritu Santo (Holy Spirit), he is the one who acts to accomplish the thing that must happen in the present. Through his power the promises of the Infinito Dios to the People are formed and fulfilled. He is watchman from 11:00 PM to midnight or 12: 00MN.

=== Other mythological figures ===
- Bernardo Carpio – The Hispanized avatar of the gigantic underworld crocodile that cause earthquake in pre-colonial Tagalog mythology, and of Palangíyi the mythical King of the Tagalog people. Legend has it that the Tagalogs have a giant king—a messianic figure—named Bernardo Carpio, squeezed between two mountains or two great rocks in the Mountains of Montalban, and who causes earthquakes whenever he tries to free himself. Once the last link on the chains binding him is broken, the enslavement and oppression of his people will be replaced with freedom and happiness. Filipino revolutionary heroes Jose Rizal and Andres Bonifacio are said to have paid homage to the Bernardo Carpio legend – the former by making a pilgrimage to Montalban, and the latter making the caves of Montalban the secret meeting place for the Katipunan movement.
- Maria Makiling – The diwata of Mt. Makiling.
- Palangíyi (from Malay Palángi = rainbow) – The mythical king of the Tagalog people.
- Balitóc (Balitók = gold) – An archetypal witch (manggagaway) of the ancient Tagalogs. Probably the spirit of a famous priestess or a famous witch, perhaps legendary, e.g. Si Balitók ang gumáway sa bátang yarí = It is Balitok who has bewitched the child [SB 1613: 284].
- Primordial Kite – caused the sky and the sea to war, which resulted in the sky to throw boulders at the sea, creating islands; built a nest on an island and left the sky and sea in peace
- Unnamed God – the god of vices mentioned as a rival of Bathala
- Sidapa – god of war who settles disputes among mortals. He also appeared in the Tagalog tale "Why the Cock Crows at Dawn"
- Amansinaya – goddess of fishermen
- Amihan – a primordial deity who intervened when Bathala and Amansinaya were waging a war; a gentle wind deity, daughter of Bathala, who plays during half of the year, as playing together with her brother, Habagat, will be too much for the world to handle
- Habagat – an active wind deity, son of Bathala, who plays during half of the year, as playing together with his sister, Amihan, will be too much for the world to handle
- Sinukan – tasked her lover Bayani to complete a bridge
- Bayani – lover of Sinukan who failed to complete a bridge; engulfed by a stream caused by the wrath of Sinukan
- Ulilangkalulua – a giant snake that could fly; enemy of Bathala, who was killed during their combat
- Galangkalulua – winged god who loves to travel; Bathala's companion who perished due to an illness, where his head was buried in Ulilangkalulua's grave, giving birth to the first coconut tree, which was used by Bathala to create the first humans
- Bighari – the flower-loving goddess of the rainbow; a daughter of Bathala
- Liwayway – the goddess of dawn; a daughter of Bathala
- Tag-ani – the god of harvest; a son of Bathala
- Kidlat – the god of lightning; a son of Bathala
- Hangin – the god of wind; a son of Bathala
- Bulan-hari – one of the deities sent by Bathala to aid the people of Pinak; can command rain to fall; married to Bitu-in
- Bitu-in – one of the deities sent by Bathala to aid the people of Pinak
- Alitaptap – daughter of Bulan-hari and Bitu-in; has a star on her forehead, which was struck by Bulan-hari, resulting to her death; her struck star became the fireflies
- Sawa – a deity who assumed the form of a giant snake when he appeared to a priestess in a cave-temple
- Rajo – a giant who stole the formula for creating wine from the gods; tattled by the night watchman who is the moon; his conflict with the moon became the lunar eclipse
- Unnamed Moon God - the night watchman who tattled on Rajo's theft, leading to an eclipse
- Nuno – the owner of the mountain of Taal, who disallowed human agriculture at Taal's summit
- Hari sa Bukid – a king who disallowed the people from planting at the summit of his kingdom's mountain; unless his people showed their industry and hard work, he remains smoking tobacco in the center of the Earth
- Great Serpent of Pasig – a giant serpent who created the Pasig river after merchants wished to the deity; in exchange for the Pasig's creation, the souls of the merchants would be owned by the serpent
- Golden Calf of Banahaw – an enormous golden calf who serve as guardian of Mount Banahaw
- Doce Pares – the twelve brave young men who embarked on a quest to retrieve the Golden Calf of Banahaw, headed by the culture-hero Rizal; said to return to the people as giants, together with the Golden Calf, to aid their people in war
- Rizal – a culture-hero who led the quest to retrieve the Golden Calf of Banahaw; traditions state that once a world war breaks, he and the Doce Pares will come down from the mountain with the Golden Calf to aid his people in their struggle; another versions states he will aid the people, arriving through a ship
- Pablo Maralit – an epic hero who became the ruler of Lipa; has various powers and amulets
- Catalina – wife of Pablo Maralit
- Balo-na – a wise old woman who foresaw the arrival of the warriors of La-ut that would conquer and ransack the land of Pinak
- Dana – a princess who revered the sun god through dances at the Rock of Bathala; impregnated by the sun god and banished from the kingdom, causing the flowers of the rivers to wither; she was later asked to return and continue her sun worship
- Loku – a ruler from Quiapo who started to believe in a foreign god; when his people were attacked by foreigners, he was defeated as he could not ask the help of the anitos

== Tau-buid Mangyan (Batangan) ==
=== Immortals ===
- Rawtit: The ancient and gigantic matriarch who wields a huge knife, wears a lycra, and has magical power to leap miles in one bound; she brings peace to the forest and all its inhabitants
- Quadruple Deities: the four childless naked deities, composed of two gods who come from the sun and two goddesses who come from the upper part of the river; summoned using the paragayan or diolang plates

== Buhid Mangyan ==
=== Immortals ===
- Sayum-ay and Manggat: the ancestral ancient couple who named all trees, animals, lakes, rocks, and spirits
- Labang: evil spirits which manifests in animal forms whose bites are fatal, as the bite marks on humans can become channels for bad spirits
- Lahi: spirits which are potential allies and protectors against the Labang
  - Afo Daga: owner of the earth; can cast earthquakes, typhoons, and disease outbreaks when mankind defies the moral codes; appeased though the igluhodan ritual
  - Afo Fungsu: owner of mountain peaks
  - Afo Sapa: owner of rivers
- Falad: souls of the dead
- Malawan: spirits that live in the springs in the deep forest
- Taw Gubat: jungle men who live deep in the forest
- Bulaw: those who live in mountain peaks; depicted as shooting stars because they fly from one peak to another and lights its way with a torch made from human bone

=== Mortals ===
- Bulang: a man who got stuck underwater during a torrential rain, resulting to his body become a rock called Bato Bulang; his rock serves as a stopper to a hole beneath it at the Binagaw river, where if it is to be removed, the whole area will be submerged in water

== Hanunoo Mangyan ==
=== Immortals ===
- Mahal na Makaako: the supreme deity who gave life to all human beings merely by gazing at them
- Binayo: owner of a garden where all spirits rest
- Binayi: a sacred female spirit who is the caretaker of the Kalag Paray; married to Balingabong
- Balungabong: spirit who is aided by 12 fierce dogs; erring souls are chased by these dogs and are eventually drowned in a cauldron of boiling water; married to Binayi
- Kalag Paray: rice spirits; appeased to ensure a bountiful harvest
- Labang: evil spirits who can take the form of animals and humans
- Apu Dandum: spirit living in the water
- Apu Daga: spirit living in the soil
- Daniw: spirit residing in the stone cared for by the healers

=== Mortals ===
- Anay and Apog: the only two humans who survived the great flood which killed every other human; lived on top of Mount Naapog
- Inabay: wife of Amalahi; met a ghoul, who she requested betel nuts to chew on, as per custom; later turned into a ghoul due to the ghoul's betel nuts
- Amalahi: husband of Inabay; killed by his wife, who had turned into a ghoul
- Daga-daga: eldest child of Inabay and Amalahi; sister of Palyos; called on the help of the Timawa to escape from her mother, and took care of her child brother in the forest
- Palyos: younger child of Ibanay and Amalahi; brother of Daga-daga; befriended a wild chicken who he became friends with until he became tall; eventually, his friend chicken left the world of the living, leaving on its two wings, which when Palyos planted, sprouted and fruited rice, clothing, beads, and many others, which he and his sister shared with others
- Timawa: the elves who aided the child Daga-daga and her small brother Palyos to escape from their mother, Inabay, who had turned into a ghoul
- Amalahi: a grinning man who tricked the giant Amamangan and his family, which led to their death
- Amamangan: a giant whose entire family were tricked by Amalahi, leading to death
- Daldali: the fast one, who is always in a hurry, which usually results into deplorable things; cousin of Malway-malway
- Malway-malway: the slow one, whose acts are normal and proper; cousin of Daldali
- Monkey and Crocodile: two characters where Monkey always outwits
- Juan Pusong: a trickster character

== Bicolano ==
=== Immortals ===
- Gugurang: the supreme god; causes the pit of Mayon volcano to rumble when he is displeased; cut Mt. Malinao in half with a thunderbolt; the god of good
- Asuang: brother of Gugurang; an evil god who wanted Gugurang's fire, and gathered evil spirits and advisers to cause immortality and crime to reign; vanquished by Gugurang but his influence still lingers
- Assistants of Gugurang
  - Linti: controls lightning
  - Dalodog: controls thunder
- Unnamed Giant: supports the world; movement from his index finger causes a small earthquake, while movement from his third finger causes strong ones; if he moves his whole body, the earth will be destroyed
- Languiton: the god of the sky
- Tubigan: the god of the water
- Dagat: goddess of the sea
- Paros: god of the wind; married to Dagat
- Daga: son of Dagat and Paros; inherited his father'control of the wind; instigated an unsuccessfully rebellion against his grandfather, Languit, and died; his body became the earth
- Adlao: son of Dagat and Paros; the embodiment of the Sun that joined Daga's rebellion and died; his body became the sun; in another myth, he was alive and during a battle, he cut one of Bulan's arm and hit Bulan's eyes, where the arm was flattened and became the earth, while Bulan's tears became the rivers and seas
- Bulan: son of Dagat and Paros; the embodiment of the Moon he joined Daga's rebellion; his body became the moon; in another myth, he was alive and from his cut arm, the earth was established, and from his tears, the rivers and seas were established
- Bitoon: daughter of Dagat and Paros; accidentally killed by Languit during a rage against his grandsons' rebellion; her shattered body became the stars
- Unnamed God: a sun god who fell in love with the mortal, Rosa; refused to light the world until his father consented to their marriage; he afterwards visited Rosa, but forgetting to remove his powers over fire, he accidentally burned Rosa's whole village until nothing but hot springs remained
- Magindang: the god of fishing who leads fishermen in getting a good fish catch through sounds and signs
- Okot: the forest god whose whistle would lead hunters to their prey
- Bakunawa: a serpent that seeks to swallow the moon
- Haliya: the goddess of the moon
- Apolaki: a mountain monster
- Batala: a good god who battled against Kalaon
- Kalaon: an evil god of destruction
- Son of Kalaon: son of Kalaon who defied his evil father's wishes
- Onos: freed the great flood that changed the land's features
- Oryol: a wily serpent who appeared as a beautiful maiden with a seductive voice; admired the hero Handyong's bravery and gallantry, leading her to aid the hero in clearing the region of beasts until peace came into the land

=== Mortals ===
- Baltog: the hero who slew the giant wild boar Tandayag
- Handyong: the hero who cleared the land of beasts with the aid of Oryol; crafted the people's first laws, which created a period for a variety of human inventions
- Bantong: the hero who single-handedly slew the half-man half-beast Rabot
- Dinahong: the first potter; a pygmy who taught the people how to cook and make pottery
- Ginantong: made the first plow, harrow, and other farming tools
- Hablom: the inventor of the first weaving loom and bobbins
- Kimantong: the first person to fashion the rudder called timon, the sail called layag, the plow called arado, the harrow called surod, the ganta and other measures, the roller, the yoke, the bolo, and the hoe
- Sural: the first person to have thought of a syllabary; carved the first writing on a white rock-slab from Libong
- Gapon: polished the rock-slab where the first writing was on
- Takay: a lovely maiden who drowned during the great flood; transformed into the water hyacinth in Lake Bato
- Rosa: a sun god's lover, who perished after the sun god accidentally burned her entire village
- Malinay: a fearless girl who explored the forests and caves filled with spirits; known in the tale of the origin of bananas

== Waray ==
=== Immortals ===
- Makapatag-Malaon: the supreme deity with both male and female aspect; the male aspect is Makapatag, the leveler who is fearful and destructive, while the female aspect is Malaon, the ancient understanding goddess
- Badadum: a guide of the dead; gathers the souls of the newly dead to meet their relatives at the mouth of a river in the lower world
- Hamorawan Lady: the deity of the Hamorawan spring in Borongan, who blesses the waters with healing properties
- Berbinota: the beautiful goddess who rules the island of Biri, whose formations were made during the battle of the gods
- Maka-andog: an epic giant-hero who was friends with the sea spirits and controlled wildlife and fish; first inhabitant and ruler of Samar who lived for five centuries; later immortalized as a deity of fishing
- Rizal: a culture-hero who is prophesied to someday return to aid his people in their struggle
- Igsabod: one of the 10–11 giant siblings of Maka-andog; friends with the sea spirits
- Paula Tomaribo: giant wife and, in some tales, the sibling of Maka-andog; in another tale, she was of Moro origin
- Banogbarigos: brother of Maka-andog; became the first aswang
- Pagsabihon: one who punishes those who speak of him
- Delbora: the one who kaingin farmers offer food; wife of Delalaman
- Sanghid: wove cloth on a gold loom with supernatural speed; has the power to move back the sun
- Mother of Maka-andog: a gigantic being whose head alone is as large as a hill; lived in Mt. Hurao
- Father of Maka-andog: lived in Mt. Hurao in the middle of Samar; more powerful than his sons, including Maka-andog
- Tigalhong: brother of Maka-andog; first inhabitant of Leyte
- Delalaman: a giant who defeated a priest in a challenge; remained faithful to the old faith, and was never baptised, just like Maka-andog and the other ancestors
- Dawisan: one of 9–12 children of Maka-andog who inherited his father's strength and magic
- Yugang: a wife of Maka-andog associated with the gold loom

== Eskaya ==
=== Immortals ===
- Ai Suno: the supreme child deity also called Salvador Suno; later conflated with the Child Jesus due to Christian influence
- Baroko: the bird who aided in the retrieval of the Lingganay nga Ugis (silver bell), which it dropped at Kamayaan river and can only be retrieved by Ai Suno when he returns on land, free his people from bondage and give them their second bodies; if the bell is retrieved by someones else, a great deluge will occur

=== Mortals ===
- Pinay: the founder of the Eskaya language and script; in some sources, Datahan, a historical person who founded an Eskaya school, is said to be a reincarnation of Pinay
- Tumud Babaylan: custodian of a sacred silver bell who was stolen by a Spanish priest named Prayleng Vicente; retrieved the stolen by through the aid of a bird called Baroko, who flew with the bell
- Humabad: a priest-ruler of Opon, known for his treachery of welcoming the foreigner Magellan and conducting a blood compact with him
- Umanad: the epic hero and ruler of Cortes who refused to be baptized and subjugated by Magellan; he allied himself with Lapu-Lapu of Mactan and bravely waged war against Humanad upon his return to Bohol, which ended with Humabad's death and a mortally wounded Umanad
- Daylinda: wife of Umanad who was baptized by Magellan; was afterwards gently cast away by Umanad; committed ritual suicide due to the death of her husband
- Dangko: the ruler of Talibon who refused to be baptized and subjugated by Magellan
- Iriwan: an aide provided by Lapu-lapu to Umanad; became a good friend of Umanad; aided Umanad in his battle against Humabad; sailed Umanad's mortally-wounded body to Cortes through the mystical snaking river Abatan-Waji

== Bisaya ==
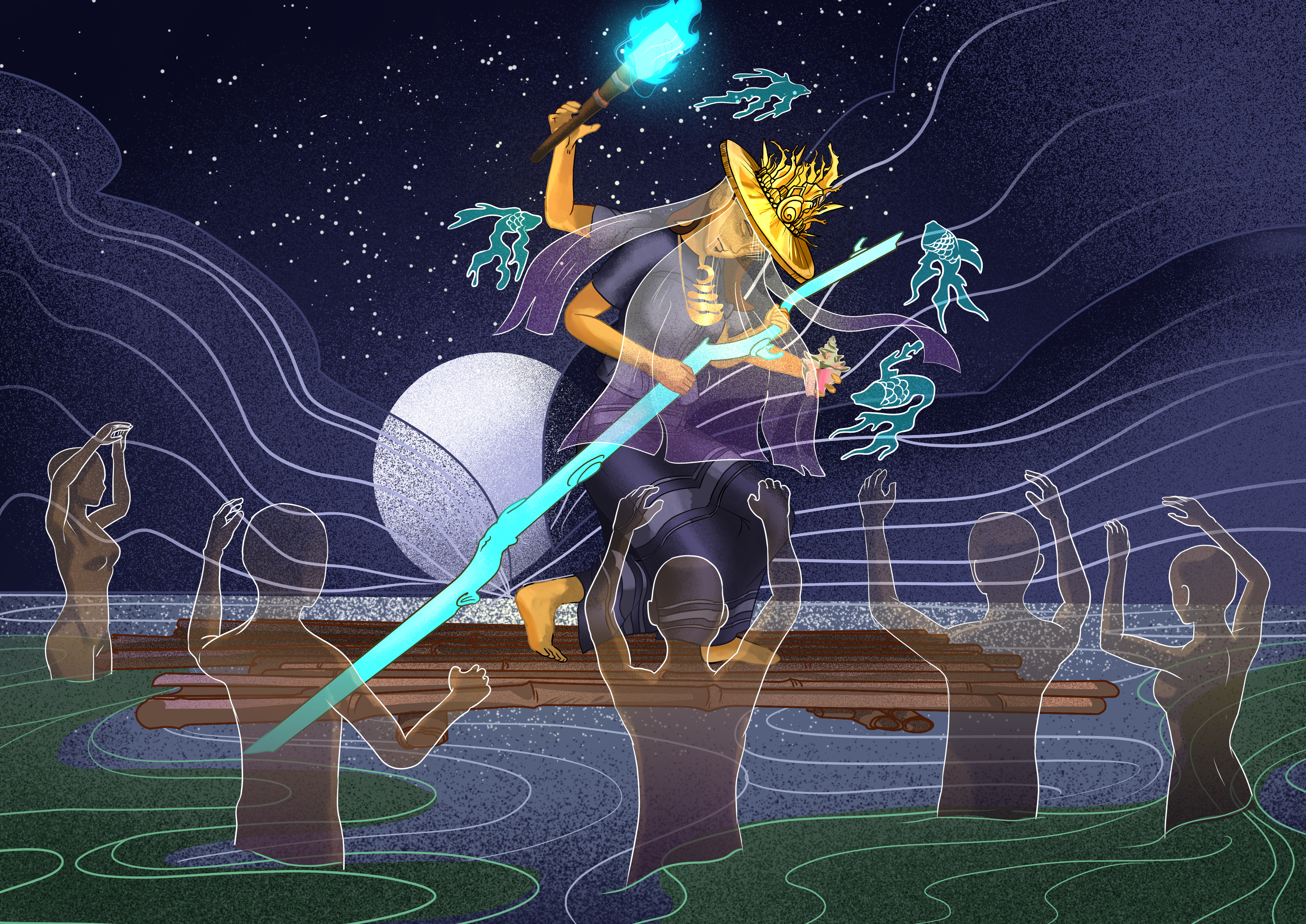
Magwayen

=== Immortals ===
- Kaptan: the supreme god and sky god who fought against Magwayen for eons until Manaul intervened; ruler of the skyworld called Kahilwayan; controls the wind and lightning; in some myths, is married to Maguyaen; also referred as Bathala in one myth; also referred as Abba in one chronicle
- Magwayen: the goddess who rules of the waters as her kingdom; mother of Lidagat; sister of Kaptan
- Messengers of Kaptan
  - Dalagan: the swiftest winged giant, armed with long spears and sharp swords
  - Guidala: the bravest winged giant armed with long spears and sharp swords
  - Sinogo: the handsomest winged giant armed with long spears and sharp swords; best loved by Kaptan but betrayed his master and was imprisoned under the sea
- Maguyaen: the goddess of the winds of the sea
- Magauayan: fought against Kaptan for eons until Manaul intervened
- Manaul: the great bird who dropped great rocks upon the battle of Kaptan and Magauayan, creating islands
- Helpers of Manaul
  - Kanauay
  - Amihan
- Lidagat: the sea married to the wind; daughter of Maguayan
- Lihangin: the wind married to the sea; son of Kaptan
- Licalibutan: the rock-bodied son of Lidagat and Lihangin; inherited the control of the wind from his father; initiated the revolt against one of his grandfathers, Kaptan; killed by Kaptan's rage; his body became the earth
- Liadlao: the gold-bodied son of Lidagat and Lihangin; killed by Kaptan's rage during the great revolt; his body became the sun
- Libulan: the copper-bodied son of Lidagat and Lihangin; killed by Kaptan's rage during the great revolt; his body became the moon
- Lisuga: the silver-bodied son of Lidagat and Lihangin; accidentally killed by Kaptan's rage during her brothers' revolt; her body fragments became the stars
- Adlaw: the sun deity worshiped by the good
- Bulan: the moon deity who gives light to sinners and guides them in the night
- Bakunawa: the serpent deity who can coil around the world; sought to swallow the seven moons, successfully eating the six, where the last is guarded by bamboos
- Divities under Kaptan
  - Makilum-sa-twan: the god of plains and valleys
  - Makilum-sa-bagidan: the god of fire
  - Makilum-sa-tubig: the god of the sea
  - Kasaray-sarayan-sa-silgan: the god of streams
  - Magdan-durunoon: the god of hidden lakes
  - Sarangan-sa-bagtiw: the god of storms
  - Suklang-malaon: the goddess of happy homes
  - Alunsina: the goddess of the sky
  - Abyang: another deity under Kaptan
- Maka-ako: also called Laon; the creator of the universe
- Linok: the god of earthquakes
- Makabosog: a deified chieftain who provides food for the hungry
- Sidapa: the god of death; co-ruler of the middleworld called Kamaritaan, together with Makaptan
- Makaptan: the god of sickness; co-ruler of the middleworld called Kamaritaan, together with Sidapa; he is a brother of Magyan and Sumpoy
- Deities under Sidapa and Makaptan
  - Danapolay: the god who supervises the other deities who answer to Sidapa and Makaptan
  - Tagusirangan
  - Duwindihan
  - Dalongdongan
  - Tagabititlakan-ka-adlaw
  - Suta
  - Agta
  - Tabukuun
- Sappia: the goddess of mercy originating from the island of Bohol who empties the milk from her breasts onto weeds, giving the origin of white rice; when milk ran out, blood came out from her breast, giving the origin of red rice
- Tan Mulong: guardian of a spirit cave where souls may be imprisoned; has a spirit dog with one mammary gland and two genitals
- Pandaque: messenger of Sidapa; sacrifice is offered to the deity so that a soul can be admitted to the skyworld, Kahilwayan, from the lower world, Kasakitan; lives in Kasakitan, despite being a messenger of Sidapa, who lives in the middleworld, Kamaritaan; also referred as Pandagoy
- Magyan: carries the souls of the dead to the lower world, Kasakitan, on his boat called balanday; co-ruler of the lower world Kasakitan, together with Sumpoy; he is a brother of Makaptan and Sumpoy
- Sumpoy: takes the souls from Magyan's balanday and carries them to a place in Kasakitan called Kanitu-nituhan; co-ruler of the lower world Kasakitan, together with Magyan; he is a brother of Magyan and Makaptan
- Sisiburanen: ruler of Kanitu-nituhan, a sub-realm of the lower world, Kasakitan; acts as slaver of the souls of those who cannot and have yet go into the skyworld; feeds the souls to Simuran and Siguinarugan after the souls stay in Kanitu-nituhan for years
- Kuruntang
  - Simuran: one of the two giant guards of the gates of Kanitu-nituhan
  - Siguinarugan: one of the two giant guards of the gates of Kanitu-nituhan; also referred as Siginarugan and Siginarungan
- Other inhabitants of Kasakitan
  - Abyang Durunuun: the goddess of charms
  - Saragnayan: the god of darkness who protected his wife, Nagmalitong Yawa Sinagmaling, from all adversaries in Panay mythologies; his source of immortality was inputted on a wild boar, and upon the killing of the boar, he became mortal and was killed by Buyung Baranugon
  - Pinganun-pinganun: the god of enchanted places
  - Unmagad Palinti
  - Sumpay Pako-Pako
- Gods of War
  - Balangaw: the rainbow
  - Inaginid
  - Makanduk
- Lalahon: the goddess of fire, volcanoes, and the harvest; also referred as Laon
- Santonilyo: a deity who brings rain when its image is immersed at sea; deity of the white men, referring to Spanish colonizers
- Gunung: a deity of volcanoes
- Magbibaya: a deity similar to the god Magbabaya of the Bukidnon
- Lumawig: a deity mentioned in the Aginid
- Linug: a deity of earthquakes
- Cacao: the goddess of Mount Lantoy who sells her products through a golden ship which can flood rivers
- Mangao: husband of Cacao
- Rizal: a culture-hero who is said to return in favor of his people's struggle for genuine freedom; based on a historical person
- Leon Kilat: a hero who is said will return to the people together with Rizal and Bonifacio in Cebu; based on a historical person, Pantaleon Villegas
- Buhawi: also called Kano, a hero who will someday return to aid his people in their struggle in Negros; based on the historical person, Ponciano Elopre
- Divata (general): a term that can be used to refer to any deity, especially an image of a god

=== Mortals ===
- Sicabay: the first woman
- Sicalac: the first man
- Libo: the first child and son of Sicabay and Sicalac; was taken south after the defeat of Pandaguan; became the ancestor of a brown-skinned race
- Saman: the first daughter and second child of Sicabay and Sicalac; was taken south after the defeat of Pandaguan; became the ancestor of a brown-skinned race
- Pandaguan: a younger son of Sicabay and Sicalac; a clever man who invented the fish trap which caught a giant shark; father of Arion; challenged to overpower the gods, and was punished by zapping
- Arion: son of Pandaguan who was taken north after the defeat of Pandaguan; became the ancestor of a white-skinned race
- Son of Saman and Sicalac: was taken east after the defeat of Pandaguan; became the ancestor of a yellow-skinned race
- Lapulapu: a ruler of Mactan who is valorous, strong, and noble, as well as driven and fearless especially in times of armed conflict; in one account, he is also a mangatang (pirate); bested Humabon in politics, trade, and ocean territory in most accounts, while in one account, Humabon managed to overcome Lapulapu; defeated the Spanish forces including Magellan with aid from the forces of nature; a verified historical person
- Humabon: a ruler of Sugbo who is cautious and highly respected, but also brave and courageous especially in times of armed conflict; a verified historical person
- Sri Lumay Bataugong: the legendary founder of Sugbo who was said to have come from Sumatra
- Sri Bantug: a ruler of Sugbo
- Binibini Anduki: sister of Sri Lumay
- Bulakna: wife of Lapulapu; in other epics, Lapulapu instead has three wives and eleven children
- Sawili: son of Lapulapu and Bulakna
- Zula: a ruler that Lapulapu had an enmity with due to both ruler's affection towards Bulakna
- Datu Mangal: father of Lapulapu in most versions of the story and ruler of Mactan before Lapulapu; in other versions, he is Lapulapu's uncle or friend and right-hand man; has supernatural powers, various amulets of whirlpools and oil, and a flying horse
- Matang Mataunas: mother of Lapulapu; in another tale, the mother of Lapulapu is instead named Matang Matana; also called Matang Mantaunas or Bauga
- Malingin: daughter of Datu Mangal and sister of Lapulapu
- Sri Mohammed: paternal grandfather of Lapulapu in one tale
- Sri Lamaraw Dula: brother of Humabon
- Bali-Alho: chief of Bo. Maribago; can break pestles with his bare hands; one of the Mactan chieftains loyally allied to Datu Mangal
- Tindak-Bukid: chief of Bo. Marigondon; can level a mountain with a kick; one of the Mactan chieftains loyally allied to Datu Mangal
- Umindig: chief of Bo. Ibo, a champion wrestler; one of the Mactan chieftains loyally allied to Datu Mangal
- Sagpang-Baha: also called Sampong-Baha; can slap back an onrushing flood; one of the Mactan chieftains loyally allied to Datu Mangal
- Bugto-Pasan: can snap the sturdiest vines with his hands; one of the Mactan chieftains loyally allied to Datu Mangal
- Silyo: a chief who borrowed an amulet from Datu Mangal; he never returned the amulet and was caught by Datu Mangal fleeing; was turned into a stone along with his crew by Datu Mangal through a curse; before turning a stone completely, he also uttered a curse to turn Datu Mangal into stone; another tale tells that Matang Mataunas and Malingin were also turned into stone
- Horned Presidente: a presidente of a town who wanted to continue controlling the people so he wished for horns to frighten them; his wish backfired, with the people withdrawing their support, which later led to his death

== Magahat ==
=== Immortals ===
- Diwat: the god of the forest who owns all lands; the Diwata festival is offered to the deity

== Ati ==
=== Immortals ===
- Magwala: also called Magdili, the supreme spirit
- Abog: chief herdsman of wild pigs and deer; the daga or diwata ritual is offered to invite the herdsmen spirits, headed by Abog
- Assistants of Abog
  - Makalisang
  - Kangil-Iran
- Spirits of the Forest: the first-fruits sacrifices of the hunt are offered to them through bits of meat, which would bring good luck to the people
  - Bakero
  - Tawo-nga-talonon
- Taglugar: also called Tagapuyo; spirits inhabiting certain places

=== Mortals ===
- Polpulan: father of Marikudo, and chief of Panay before the ascension of his son
- Marikudo: the ruler of Panay who welcomed the ten Bornean datus, who settled on the island through discussions with Marikudo and his people; married to Maniuantiuan and recognized by the ten Bornean datus as their ruler
- Maniuantiuan: the beautiful and graceful wife of Marikudo and an excellent negotiator; came from a commoner family

== Ilonggo (Hiligaynon) ==
=== Immortals ===
- Laon: the supreme goddess and creator residing in Mount Kanlaon; governs the harvest, pestilence, and locusts; also referred to as the god Lalaon
- Makaako: the creator and the most powerful god
- Kaptan: god of the earth
- Magyawan: god of the sea
- Manunubo: the good spirit of the sea
- Sidapa: god who lives in the sacred Mount Madia-as; determines the day of a person's death by marking every newborn's lifespan on a very tall tree on Madya-as
- Pandaque: god who is given ritual offerings so that a soul of the deceased will not be taken by the gods responsible for torment in the afterlife
- Gods of Torment
  - Simuran
  - Siginarugan
- Bulalakaw: god who lives in the sacred Mount Madia-as; malevolent deity in the form of a bird with a flaming tail
- Mama Guayen: a god that carries the souls of the dead in a boat to the ends of the earth; also called Maguayen
- Sumpoy: god who guides the soul toward a very high mountain
- Sisiburanen: the god who rules the mountain where Sumpoy drops off the souls of the dead
- Mangalos: the spirits who eat the insides of children; takes away young lives
- Hangin: the spirits of the death wind; takes the life of the elderly
- Sitaho: also called Sibo Malabag; the god of the early migrants from Borneo
- Cabus-Cabus: deified shaman
- Dangse: deified shaman
- Estrella Bangotbanwa: deified shaman from the 19th century
- Gods of War
  - Balangaw: the rainbow
  - Inaginid
  - Makanduk
- Canla and Ona: the couple hidden under a clod of earth thrown down by the god Lalaon as punishment to the people who showed malice towards the couple; said to go forth onto the world only after the people become good and envy in the world disappear
- Hari-sa-Boqued: an emissary of Canla and Ona; Mount Canlaon is said to burst whenever word has been sent from Canla and Ona to Hair-sa-Baqued, asking if the people have become good and envy is no longer in this world; in other versions, he is also a king of a prosperous kingdom, where his followers are humans, but in one case, he also has loyal dwarfs as followers; disallowed the people from planting tobacco near the summit, but was disobeyed, resulting in an eruption

=== Mortals ===
- Polpulan: father of Marikudo, and chief of Panay before the ascension of his son
- Marikudo: the ruler of Panay who welcomed the ten Bornean datus, who settled on the island through discussions with Marikudo and his people; married to Maniuantiuan and recognized by the ten Bornean datus as their ruler
- Maniuantiuan: the beautiful and graceful wife of Marikudo who negotiated with Pinampang; came from a commoner family
- Mambusay: son of Marikudo who first spoke with the ten Bornean datus and hear their plea
- Makatunao: a tyrant ruler whose actions forced the ten Bornean datus to flee to Panay
- Puti: the leader of the ten Bornean datus who fled to Panay; returned to Borneo and fought Makatunao
- Pinampang: wife of Puti who negotiated with Maniusntiuan
- Lumbay: one of the ten Bornean datus
- Bankaya: one of the ten Bornean datus; settled at Aklan
- Sumakuel: one of the ten Bornean datus; settled at Hamtik
- Damangsil: one of the ten Bornean datus
- Dalugdog: one of the ten Bornean datus
- Paiburong: one of the ten Bornean datus; settled at Irong-Irong
- Padohinog: one of the ten Bornean datus
- Dumocsol: one of the ten Bornean datus
- Kalengsusu: one of the ten Bornean datus
- Horned Presidente: a presidente of a town who yearned to have more power to control the people; he wished for horns to frighten his constituents, which instead led to the people withdrawing their support; died while still wanting to keep his power

== Capiznon ==
=== Immortals ===
- Laon: the supreme deity; a fire goddess said to reside in the mountain at the neighboring island of Negros
- Bulalakaw: a bird god who looks like a peacock and can cause illnesses; lives in Mount Madja-as
- Mediators to the Gods
  - Bangutbanwa: ensures good harvests and an orderly universe
  - Mangindalon: intercedes for sick persons; punishes enemies
  - Soliran: one of two performers of the marriage ceremonies
  - Solian: one of two performers of the marriage ceremonies
  - Manunubo: the good spirit of the sea
- Tungkung Langit: the god of the sky who brings famine, drought, storms, and floods
- Lulid-Batang: the god of the earth, responsible for earthquakes and volcanic eruptions
- Linting Habughabug: the god of lightning, whose look kills people and who shouts in anger
- Launsina: the goddess of the sun, moon, stars, and seas, and the most beloved because people seek forgiveness from her
- Burigadang Pada Sinaklang Bulawan: the goddess of greed to whom people pray when they want to get rich
- Saragnayan: the god of darkness who has the power to replace brightness with darkness
- Lubay-lubyuk Hanginun si Mahuyuk-huyukun: the goddess of the evening breeze; cools people, especially during the summer
- Suklang Malayun: the guardian of happy homes
- Maklilum-sa-twan: the god of the plains and valleys.
- Agurang: the good spirit who fought against Asuwang
- Asuwang: the malevolent spirit who fought against Asuwang

== Aklanon ==
=== Immortals ===
- Gamhanan: the supreme deity and giver of life, security, and livelihood; lives with many other gods in Mount Daeogdog, where he gives life and punishes errant mortals; used to have a loyal deer-like pet and messenger called Panigotlo, which bleated as a sign of abundance to mortals or foretells floods and despairs to alert the people
- Bululakaw: lived in the island's sacred mountain called Madya-as
- Laon: a chief goddess
- Mediators to the Gods
  - Bangutbanwa: deity who is prayed to for a good harvests and an orderly universe
  - Mangindalon: intercedes for sick persons and punishes enemies
  - Soliran: performs marriage ceremonies
  - Solian: performs marriage ceremonies
  - Manunubo: the good spirit of the sea

=== Mortals ===
- Damhanan: the hunter who killed Panigotlo, the sacred deer-like pet of Gamhanan
- Daeogdog: a man with violent temper whose name means thunder; married to Mabuot; wanted to force a marriage between his daughter Agahon and a man named Maeopig
- Mabuot: a woman who was kind and gentle, married to Daeogdog; tried to prevent the marriage of Agahon with the hot-tempered Maeopig
- Agahon: daughter of Daeogdog and Mabuot; said to be as lovely as the dawn; was to be married to Maeopig even though she rejected the proposal; killed herself before the marriage; from her burial, grew the mango tree
- Maeopig: suitor of Agahon; had an uncontrollable anger and was chosen by Daeogdog to marry his daughter

== Karay-a ==
=== Immortals ===
- Maka-ako: the supreme deity residing on the uppermost level of the cosmic universe's seven layers
- Alunsina: the mother goddess of the Hinilawod epic heroes; aided in the battle against Saragnayon
- Laonsina: a sky goddess and grandmother of Nagmalitung Yawa
- Unnamed Sky God: a sky god who prevented Balanakon from traveling to Labaw Donggon's territory
- Tagna-an: the creator god and a busalian shaman; the most powerful and versatile of all ma-aram shamans
- Hugna-an: the first man; a ma-aram shaman and child of Tagna-an
- Humihinahon: the first woman; a ma-aram shaman and child of Tagna-an
- Kapapu-an: the pantheon of ancestral spirits from whom the supernatural powers of shamans originated from; their aid enables specific types of shamans to gush water from rocks, leap far distances, create oil shields, become invisible, or pass through solid matter
- Papu Estrella Bangotbanwa: a deified shaman who controlled the forces of nature
- Sidapa: god who establishes a person's lifespan through a very tall tree on Mount Madia-as
- Pandaque: god who allows the souls of the dead to enter Mount Madya-as, the home of the dead, if a proper mag-anito ritual is held
- Simuran: a god who takes the souls to the lower regions
- Siginarugan: a god who takes the souls to the lower regions
- Bangle: carries the non-liquefied soul across the water; the way he carries the soul differs depending on the soul's answers to his questions
- Bagubu: deity of the stream which follows after the crossing with Bangle

=== Mortals ===
- Labaw Donggon: an epic hero who journeyed to many lands
- Gimbitinan: a wife of Labaw Donggon; mother of the hero Asu Mangga
- Anggoy Doronoon: a wife of Labaw Donggon; mother of the hero Buyung Baranugun
- Yawa Sinagmaling: the wife of the lord, Saragnayon; Labaw Donggon fell in love with her, leading to the battle between Labaw Donggon and Saragnayon
- Saragnayon: husband of Yawa Sinagmaling; became a mortal after the wild boar which safeguards his immortality was defeated
- Asu Mangga: hero son of Gimbitinan and Labaw Donggon; fought Saragnayon for the release of his father
- Buyung Baranugun: hero son of Anggoy Doronoon and Labaw Donggon; fought Saragnayon for the release of his father
- Humadapnon: an epic hero; brother of Labaw Donggon and husband of Nagmalitung Yawa; aided by an enchanted tree and three messengers birds in the courting of Nagmaliyung Yawa
- Nagmalitung Yawa: a powerful binukot who rescued her husband by transforming herself into a man named Buyung Sunmasakay; defeated the thousand army in Tarangban; when her mother Matan-ayon was in old age, a ritual was conducted where Nagmalitung Yawa found out about Humadapnon's promiscuity; Matan-ayon's powers were transferred to her, and she ascended into heaven with the aid of her grandmother Laonsina
- Malubay Hanginon: a powerful binukot who captured and imprisoned by Humadapnon; defeated by Nagmalitung Yawa under her male form
- Paglambuhan: a warrior who was keeping the Timpara Alimuon sacred boat in his fortress; defeated by Nagmalitung Yawa, Humadapnon, and Dumalapdap
- Matan-ayon: mother of Nagmalitung Yawa; thinking that Humadapnon has died, makes Nagmalitung Yawa pregnant to compel to her marriage with the revived Paglambuhan; Humadapnon later kills the couple, but is reunited with the revived Nagmalitung Yawa; in the Sugidanon epic, she married the reluctant Labaw Donggon
- Dumalapdap: an epic hero; brother of Labaw Donggon
- Tikim Kadlum: an enchanted dog that rouses the ire of the monster Makabagting
- Datu Paiburong: owner of Tikim Kadlum
- Amburukay: married to Labaw Donggon after she consented her golden pubic hair to be used in Labaw Donggon's kudyapi
- Pahagunon: an underworld being who abducts one of Labaw Donggon's wife, Ayon
- Ayon: abducted by Pahagunon after Labaw Donggon transformed into a sea turtle
- Giant Crab Master: a master who has a giant crab follower, who aids in the abduction of one of Labaw Donggon's wives; his loyal crab can transform into an island with betel-nut trees
- Sanagnayan: a being whose life-force is in an egg in a lion's heart; the sister of Matan-ayon is rescued by Labaw Donggon from Sanagnayan
- Balanakon: prevented by the god of the sky from sailing into Labaw Donggon's territory, resulting in a long-drawn battle
- Polpulan: father of Marikudo, and chief of Panay before the ascension of his son
- Marikudo: the ruler of Panay who welcomed the ten Bornean datus, who settled on the island through discussions with Marikudo and his people; married to Maniuantiuan and recognized by the ten Bornean datus as their ruler
- Maniuantiuan: the beautiful and graceful wife of Marikudo who negotiated with Pinampang; came from a commoner family
- Mambusay: son of Marikudo who first spoke with the ten Bornean datus and hear their plea
- Makatunao: a tyrant ruler whose actions forced the ten Bornean datus to flee to Panay
- Puti: the leader of the ten Bornean datus who fled to Panay; returned to Borneo and fought Makatunao
- Pinampang: wife of Puti who negotiated with Maniusntiuan
- Lumbay: one of the ten Bornean datus
- Bankaya: one of the ten Bornean datus; settled at Aklan
- Sumakuel: one of the ten Bornean datus; settled at Hamtik
- Damangsil: one of the ten Bornean datus
- Dalugdog: one of the ten Bornean datus
- Paiburong: one of the ten Bornean datus; settled at Irong-Irong
- Padohinog: one of the ten Bornean datus
- Dumocsol: one of the ten Bornean datus
- Kalengsusu: one of the ten Bornean datus

== Suludnon (Panay-Bukidnon) ==
=== Immortals ===
- Tungkung Langit: the supreme deity and the most powerful male Diwata; he is of unknown origin, coming from somewhere foreign to the other beings of the Sulod pantheon
- Assistants of Tungkung Langit
  - Bangun Bangun: the deity of universal time who regulates cosmic movements
  - Pahulangkug: the deity who changes the seasons
  - Ribung Linti: the deity of lightning and thunderstorms
  - Sumalongsong: the deity of the rivers and seas
  - Santonil.vo: the deity of good graces
  - Munsad Burulakaw: the deity who has direct power over men; most respected and feared in the upperworld
- Bayi: one of the two primordial giants who appeared out of nowhere and were responsible for the creation of many things; caught the primordial earthworm and gave birth to the wild animals that inhabit the earth
- Laki: one of the two primordial giants who appeared out of nowhere and were responsible for the creation of many things
- Primordial Earthworm: an ancient earthworm who excreted the earth after it was caught by the primordial giantess, Bayi
- The Three Brothers Watching Over the Soul
  - Mangganghaw: keeps track over man's affairs immediately after marriage; keeps track of pregnancy; he is the first to come to the house of a laboring mother, peeping in the houses to see the child being born, which he then reports to Manglaegas
  - Manglaegas: enters the house to look for the child to make sure the infant was born alive, then reports to Patag'aes
  - Patag'aes: awaits until midnight then enters the house to have a conversation with the living infant; if he discovers someone is eavesdropping, he will choke the child to death; their conversation creates the fate of the child, on how long the child wants to live and how the child will eventually die, where the child will always get to choose the answers; once done, Patag'aes takes out his measuring stick, computes the child's life span, and then departs, sealing the child's fate
- Bangla'e: ferries the souls across Lim'awaen, a deep lake in the underworld; asks the soul how many spouses it had on earth, where the soul is ferried and talked to differently, depending on the answer and the gender of the soul; the soul cannot lie to Bangla'e, as he will summon the tuma, a body louse and the incarnation of the soul's conscience
- Unnamed God: another god that asks questions to the soul
- Balagu: guards the bridge of a stream called Himbarawen; asks the same question as Bangla'e to the soul

== Cuyonon and Agutaynen ==
=== Immortals ===
- Diwata ng Kagubatan: goddess of the forest honored on top of Mount Caimana in Cuyo island
- Neguno: the god of the sea that cursed a selfish man by turning him into the first shark

== Pala'wan or Palawano ==
=== Immortals ===
- Empuq: the supreme deity, lord, and owner; the creator of all things in the world; also referred as Ampu, the master who wove the world and created several kinds of humanity, hence, he is also called Nagsalad (the weaver); he is a protective watching presence who lives in his abode Andunawan
- Diwata: benevolent and protective deity who stays in the median space called Lalangaw; the mediator between humans and the supreme deity
- Beljan: the spirits of all beljan (shamans); able to travel to the vertical universe, divided into fourteen different layers, in order to heal the world and to re-establish cosmic balance; also referred to as Balyan
- Lenggam: demon-like beings of the forest who act as the caretakers of poisonous and biting animals such as scorpions and snakes; also called Langgam or Saytan, they can be harmful to humans but also benevolent bringers of inspiration and knowledge
- Ampu at Paray: the master of rice
- Linamin at Barat: the lady-goddess of the monsoon winds
- Linamin at Bulag: the lady-goddess of the dry season
- Upu Kuyaw: the grandfather god of thunder

== Batak ==
=== Immortals ===
- Maguimba: the god in the remotests times, lived among the people, having been summoned by a powerful babaylan (shaman); provided all the necessities of life, as well as all cures for illnesses; has the power to bring the dead back to life
- Diwata: a benevolent god who provides for the needs of women and men, and gives out rewards for good deeds
- Diwata (general): also a term which encompasses all spirits, good and bad
- Angoro: a deity who lives in Basad, a place beyond this world, where the souls find out whether they will enter the heavens called Lampanag, or be cast into the depths of Basad
- Deities of Strength
  - Siabuanan
  - Bankakah
  - Paraen
  - Buengelen
  - Baybayen
- Batungbayanin: spirit of the mountains
- Paglimusan: spirit of the small stones
- Balungbunganin: spirit of the almaciga trees
- Sulingbunganin: spirit of the big rocks
- Esa’: an ancestor whose movements created the landscapes, which he named during a hunting journey with his dogs, who were after wild pigs
- Baybay: the goddess and master of rice who originated from Gunay Gunay, the edge of the universe; married to Ungaw
- Ungaw: the god and master of bees who originated from Gunay Gunay, the edge of the universe; married to Baybay
- Panya’en: mystic entities who control certain wild trees and various animals
- Kiudalan: in charge of forest pigs
- Napantaran: in charge of forest pigs

== Tagbanwa ==
=== Immortals ===
- Mangindusa: also referred as Nagabacaban, the highest-ranking deity who lives in Awan-awan, the region beyond the Langit; the god of the heavens and the punisher of crime; also referred as Magindusa, the deity who gives humans their true souls called the kyaraluwa at birth, through the nose of the baby emerging from the vulva; never descends from Awan awan; he is depicted as sitting and swinging back and forth in a bintayawan
- Bugawasin: wife of Mangindusa
- Dibuwatanin: the messengers of Mangindusa
- Tungkuyanin: deity who sits on the edge of this sky-cover with his feet dangling into the universe; also sits looking down at the earth; if he were to raise his head and look up, he would fall into the nothingness
- Magrakad: a god found at exactly noontime on the other side of the sun; gives the warmth which sustains life and, when the people are ill, carries away sickness
- Bangkay: spirits of the cloud region called Dibuwat; spirits of the people who have been killed by violence, poison, or those who died in giving birth
- Bulalakaw: also called Diwata kat Dibuwat; they fly-travel throughout the cloud regions to help the people
- Polo: the benevolent god of the sea whose help is invoked during times of illness
- Sedumunadoc: the god of the earth, whose favor is sought in order to have a good harvest
- Tabiacoud: the god of the underworld in the deep bowels of the earth
- Diwata Kat Sidpan: a deity who lives in the western region called Sidpan; controls the rains
- Diwata Kat Libatan: a deity who lives in the eastern region called Babatan; controls the rain
- Tumangkuyun: wash and keep clean the trunks of the two sacred cardinal trees in Sidpan and Babatan by using the blood of those who have died in epidemics; the blood he uses causes the colors of the sunrise and sunset
- Amyan: the hot, dry northeast winds
- Diwata katamyan: invoked when the wet period lasts too long and these Amyan hot-dry winds are needed
- Salakap: the spirits of epidemic sickness which arrive on earth through the northwest winds; initially were humans who were forced, thru a discriminatory decree or through their comrade's trick, to consume either the feces or flesh of a dead human, which turned them into Salakap
- Tumungkuyan: leaders of the Salakap who paint tree trunks the support the sky using the blood of the epidemic-dead
- Sumurutun: captain of the outrigger which transports the dead to Kiyabusan
- Fuku: deity of smallpox
- Lumalayag: warriors who challenge and fight the Salakap
- Tandayag: a deity who lives in Kiyabusan; sent by the supreme deity to live with the Salakap in order to prevent them from sailing except during the northeast winds, as per an agreement between the Salakap and the supreme deity
- Taliyakud: chief god of the underworld who tends a fire between two tree trunks; asks the souls of the dead questions, where the soul's louse acts as the conscience that answers the questions truthfully; if the soul is wicked, it is pitched and burned, but if it is good, it passes on to a happier place with abundant food
- Diwata: general term for deities; they created the first man made from earth and gave him the elements of fire, the flint-like stones, iron, and tinder, as well as rice and most importantly, rice-wine, which humans could use to call the deities and the spirits of their dead

== Surigaonon ==
=== Immortals ===
- God of Animals: the deity of animals who allowed the creatures to speak but forbade them from dancing; when a king heard of an island filled with dogs, he ordered a captain to get some of them; the captain ordered the dogs which they did, angering the god of animals who struck their ship with lightning, killing the captain and turning the dogs and ship into an island called Tagbayanga, which now protects the town of Pilar from strong winds and waves
- Mount Diwata Deities: a group of deities (diwata) at the Diwata Mountains, whose privacy was subjugated by the noise created by the hornbills (kalaw); the oldest among them used her wooden staff and tapped in on the ground three times, which made their home flew up and became the island of Camiguin; a crater was left, which became Lake Mainit
- Pikit Octopus: a small octopus at the Pikit river who was raised by the fivider Sario, until grew massive; inflicted illness to anyone who it has stung; when Sario died, the octopus left the river
- Rizal: a culture-hero who in the future, will return to aid his people in their struggle

=== Mortals ===
- Sario: a diviner who raised the giant octopus in the Pikit river

== Mamanwa ==
=== Immortals ===
- Tahaw: supreme deity who is given prayers of supplications and petitions
- True: deity of the forest and herder of hunting animals

== Subanon ==
=== Immortals ===
- Diwata Magbabaya: the supreme deity and creator of heaven and earth; also referred to as Diwata-sa-Langit, who lives in the sky; also referred as Bathala; can turn anyone into stone through his lightning
- Apo Asog: also called Apo Usug; the great ancestor who is the representation of the supreme deity to be with the people during the sacred buklog rituals; intervened to stop a war between the hero Sondayo and a datu (later revealed as a long-lost brother) which ignited during a buklog ritual; also called as Apo Gambabaja, worshipped during nighttime and associated with the black garment which protects against the effects of the eclipse
- Palmot: one of trusted heavenly messenger of the supreme deity; an angel
- Tagma-sa-Dagat: the god of the sea
- Tagma-sa-Yuta: the god of the earth
- Tagma-sa-Manguabungud: the god of the woods
- Tagma-sa-uba: the god of the rivers
- Tagma-sa-langit: the god who protects the sick
- Jobrael: also called Jobraim; son of a human and a supernatural; stayed on earth for a thousand years, and was taken back to heaven by Palmot after he failed to raise the divine kettle provided by the supreme deity

=== Mortals ===
- Son of Jobrael: was to be taken back to heaven seven years after his father, Jobrael, was called back; retained his earthly status due to a seven-year plan initiated by his wife
- Wife of Jobrael's Son: devised the creation of the entire buklog rituals and its instruments, resulting to her husband's permanent residence on earth
- Gomotan Raja: an ancient leader who settled at the banks of Lapuyan river
- Gomotan Sangira: an ancient leader who settled in Megusan
- Palaganding: son of Gomotan Sangira and twin brother of Rainding; a brave and proficient swordsman
- Rainding: son of Gomotan Sangira and twin brother of Palaganding; a brave and proficient swordsman
- Gomeed: son of Gomotan Sangira; a brave and proficient swordsman
- Bulaw: daughter of Gomotan Sangira; a brave and proficient swordswoman
- Rajah Humabon: a Subanon who migrated to Cebu and became a ruler there

== Manuvu ==
=== Immortals ===
- Manama: the supreme deity also referred as Sigalungan, meaning all seeing; created the diwatas to assist him in creation; created the earth from his fingernail scrapings
- Assistants in Manama's creation: all were given katusan (precognition and power); their bodies were life fingernails, smooth and shiny and only their joints have skin
  - Pammaong na Diwata
  - Paong na Katusan
  - Panayangan
  - Tumanud
  - Anitu
- Ogassi: brother of Manama; incorporated abaca strans into the clay that would become humans, causing mankind's mortality

== Bukidnon ==
=== Immortals ===
- Diwata na Magbabaya: simply referred as Magbabaya; the good supreme deity and supreme planner who looks like a man; created the earth and the first eight elements, namely bronze, gold, coins, rock, clouds, rain, iron, and water; using the elements, he also created the sea, sky, moon, and stars; also known as the pure god who wills all things; one of three deities living in the realm called Banting; holds up the serpent deities Intumbangol so they won't fall off the world; also referred to as Bathala
- Dadanhayan ha Sugay: the evil lord from whom permission is asked; depicted as the evil deity with a human body and ten heads that continuously drools sticky saliva, which is the source of all waters; one of the three deities living in the realm called Banting
- Agtayabun: the adviser and peace maker deity with a hawk-like head, wings, and a human body; tempers the heads of Diwata na Magbabaya and Dadanhayan ha Sugay whenever the two argue; one of the three deities living in the realm called Banting, where he holds the other two in a suspending fashion, while maintaining the balanace of Banting; the beating of his wings produce the wind
- Incantus: six of the seven original figures initially created by the three supreme deities; became guardian spirits and divinities when they were finished by Dadanhayan ha Sugay; they are both good and evil, but they take care of nature and will give its fruits if given respect through offerings; if offended, they can send droughts, flood, pestilence, or sickness
  - Talagbugta: look after the soil
  - Ibabagsuk: take care of nature and grow plants
  - Bulalakaw: guards the water and all the creatures living in it
  - Mamelig: watch over the forest
  - Lalawig: watch over the bees and honey
  - Mamahandi: guards over the material wealth that men acquire
- First Human: one of the seven original figures created by the three supreme deities; became the first human when finished by Diwata na Magbabaya; endowed with intelligence, and entrusted with the Haldan ta Paraiso
- Magbabaya (general): general term for the gods of the universe living at the points where the world's concavities meet; usually referred simply to the supreme deity named Diwata na Magbabaya
- Intumbangol: a pair of serpent deities who support the earth from the underworld; one is male, the other female; their movement causes earthquakes, their breathing causes winds, and their panting causes violent storms
- Miyaw-Biyaw: the deity who breathes the makatu (soul) into humans at birth
- Andalapit: leads the soul from the banquet in Kumbirahan into the foot of Mount Balatucan, where the gods of the seas are assembled to judge the soul
- Mangilala: god of temptation that haunts the seventh tier of the underworld; brother of Magbabaya, who he aided in the creation of humans, although when Mangilala breathed into the figures, humans became tempted to evil things
- Assistants of Magbabaya
  - Domalongdong: god of the north wind
  - Ognaaling: god of the south wind
  - Tagaloambung: god of the east wind
  - Magbaya: god of the west wind
- Agents of Magbabaya
  - Tagumbanwa: guardian of the fields
  - Ibabasag: goddess of pregnant women
  - Ipamahandi: goddess of accidents
  - Pamahandi: protector of carabaos and horses
  - Tao-sa-sulup: god of material goods
  - Tigbas: god of good government
  - Busao: god of calamity
  - Talagbusao: bloodthirsty god of war
- Camiguin: a mountain goddess who lived peacefully until the noisy kalaw disturbed her; sank and established Lake Mainit, and rose to sea, moving westward until she became the island of Camiguin
- Python of Pusod Hu Dagat: the gigantic python living at the center of the sea; caused a massive flood when it coiled its body at sea
- Diwata (general): also a term that can be used to refer to the people of heaven

=== Mortals ===
- Agyu: subdued the Intumbangol
- Tuluyan: son of Agyu, who gave him the source of traditional authority called Takalub, composed of the boar-tusk bracelet Baklaw and the black stick Gilling, which gave its owner Kalaki (talent and power) to settle disputes
- Gahemen: a widow who survived the flood caused by the Python of Pusod Hu Dagat
- Teheban: son of Gahemen after the great flood caused by the Python of Pusod Hu Dagat
- Pabulusen: son of Gahemen and Teheban; his people became keepers of power
- A-ayawa-en: son of Gahemen and Teheban; his people became keepers of religious customs
- Tataun-en: son of Gahemen and Teheban; his people often experienced hunger
- Bala-ol: brother of Mampolompon; survived the great drought and became an ancestor of the Bukidnon
- Mampolompon: brother of Bala-ol; survived the great drought and became an ancestor of the Bukidnon
- Tibolon: survived the great drought and became an ancestor of the Bukidnon
- Managdau: survived the great drought and became an ancestor of the Bukidnon

== Higaonon ==
=== Immortals ===
- Halangdong Magbabaya: the supreme deity; simply referred as Magbabaya, the creator of all things
- Diwata: became a friend of the carpenter, David
- Limokan: a pigeon who when cooed at, ensures a bountiful harvest
- Ibabasok: the good spirit of the harvest

=== Mortals ===
- Datu Indulum: formulated the laws of Mt. Sinakungan
- David: a carpenter who gained the ability to design and make houses after he buried a shining stone from the body of a huge spider into his muscles

== Talaandig ==
=== Immortals ===
- Magbabaya: the supreme deity; the sinebugan ritual is offered to the deity for the protection of those who enter the forest
- Dadagunan hu Suguy: deity who guards of the lawn of the house
- Anilaw ha Sumagda: deity who guards the door
- Sinyuda Kahibunan: deity who keeps the hall
- Diwata ha Manilib: deity who records the activity of people inside the house
- Diwata Pinatanlay: deity who guards the house at the ridge of the roof
- Lalawag: deity who safeguards wild pigs
- Mangumanay: deity who safeguards wild chickens
- Mangusal: deity who safeguards the honeybees; the palayag ritual is performed to honor the deity
- Bulalakaw: deity who safeguards the creatures in the rivers; the lalayon ritual is offered to the deity
- Apuhan: spirit guides; known to sanctify sacred forests as a source of spiritual strength and power

== Manobo ==
=== Immortals ===
- Tagbusan: the supreme deity who rules over the destinies of all other gods and mortals
- Dagau: the goddess of creation living at the world's four pillars; established the world according to the version from Argawan and Hibung rivers; when human blood is spilled upon the face of the earth, she makes the great python wrap itself around the pillars, creating earthquakes
- Makalindung: the god of creation who set up the world on iron posts; lives in the center with a python; created the world according to the version from around Talakogan in Agusan valley
- Unnamed deities: in a third version of the creation myth, the world is a giant mushroom and unnamed deities are said to shake its core when angered by humans
- Ibu: the goddess who rulers over the land of the dead, where under her governance, there are no worries or troubles and souls in the underworld continue to eat, work, and marry
- Diwata: a group of divinities that shamans call to for signs of the future
- Umli: divinities who assist mortals with help from the Diwata
- Pamdiya: divinities who have purview over war; initiate war
- Panaiyung: divinities who have purview over madness; force madness upon men
- Agkui: divinities who have purview over sexual excess
- Tagbayaw: the goddess that incites incest and adultery in mortals
- Sugudun: also called Sugujun; the god of hunters and trappers
- Apila: the god of wrestling and sports
- Kakiadan: the goddess of rice
- Taphagan: the goddess of the harvest who guards rice in the granary
- Anit: also called Anitan; the guardian of the thunderbolt
- Inaiyau: the god of storms
- Tagbanua: the god of rain
- Umouiri: the god of clouds
- Libtakan: the god of sunrise, sunset, and good weather
- Yumud: the god of water
- Manduyapit: the god who ferries departed souls across the red river before going to the afterworld
- Datu Ali (Mampuroc): a hero who fought the Spanish and became a deity; his reincarnation, Mampuroc, is a shaman-hero who is said to one day return to the people to aid them in their struggle; based on a historical person

== Mandaya ==
=== Immortals ===
- Magbabaya: the supreme deity
- Tagamaling: the fairy spirit who promotes goodness in individuals
- Diwata: spirits of the skies and earth who are everywhere; diwata who live in the skies are depicted on manaog statues, where offerings and prayers are made to prevent misfortune
- Asuang: malevolent beings who live on top of tall trees, bottoms of streams, dark places, and banyan trees; offerings are given to them if their places of residences is to used by humans
- Bu-sau: spirits who look after the welfare of bagani warriors
- Kalaloa Nang Umay: literally means, 'winnowing basket of the rice', they are the spirits of the harvest who are given offerings during planting and harvesting seasons; the first fruits of all harvest are always offered to them
- Daday: spirits of the dead
- Unnamed Woman: the woman who pressed the earth, creating mountains
- Primordial Eel: a great eel whose back holds the earth; its movements cause earthquakes if crabs and small animals annoy it

== Mansaka ==
=== Immortals ===
- Taganlang: the creator god who has a helper bird named Oribig also called Magbabaya, the creator of mankind
- Oribig: the celestial helper bird of Taganlang; flew to the far corner of the universe under the behest of Taganlang to get soil, which became the materials used by Taganlang to create earth

== Kalagan ==
=== Mortals ===
- Kawlan: an epic hero and baylan (shaman) who defeated the monster Datu Waytiyap; husband of Bodi
- Ibang: father of Kawlan; a gifted baylan (shaman)
- Salma: mother of Kawlan
- Datu Waytiyap: a giant monster who can shapeshift into a human leader; defeated by Kawlan
- Father of Bodi: an old man who rescued Kawland from a monster monkey
- Bodi: wife of Kawlan
- Datu of the East: entered into a pact of equality with the Datu of the West; worked in the morning; allowed the other datu to gain more from harvest season due to the afternoon heat
- Datu of the West: entered into a pact of equality with the Datu of the East; worked in the afternoon; requested to have more share from the harvest due to the afternoon heat

== Bagobo ==
=== Immortals ===
- Pamulak Manobo: supreme deity and creator of the world, including the land, sea, and the first humans; throws water from the sky, causing rain, while his spit are the showers; controls good harvest, rain, wind, life, and death; in some myths, the chief deity is simply referred as the male deity, Diwata
- Melu: another name of the supreme deity, who created humans, aided by his brother Fun Tao Tana
- Manama: another name of the supreme deity who created the world and human beings
- Fun Tao Tana: aided Melu in the creation of humans; put on the noses of humans upside down, which Melu corrected
- Tuglay (Toglai): one of two primordial powers, where he represents the 'fire' sky and the upperworld; taught people the concepts of sex, fertility, and intercourse; one of the two ancestors of mankind
- Tuglibong (Toglibon): one of two primordial powers, where she represents the earth and the underworld; she ordered Tuglay to go up, as the heat of the sky was not conducive for her people; she also represents the waning moon; together with Mandarangan, they represent totality; one of the two ancestors of mankind
- Mebuyan: the virgin underworld goddess who governs Banua Mebuyan, a special place reserved for children who died at their mother's breast; she nourishes the souls of dead infants, until they no longer need nursing; she is the daughter of Tuglibong & sibling of Lumabat, ruling over the earth as granted by her mother; she is the goddess of both life and death as she introduced the concept of death and made rice droppings its symbol, while depicting human lives as fruits of a tree in her hand; her action made the underworld one of two paths to the afterworld
- Lumabat (Lumabet): initiated the path to the sky, which made all humans mortal and he encourages the people to embrace death; guided his people into the sky, where they became immortals; she is the son of Tuglibong & sibling of Mebuyan; his action made the skyworld one of two paths to the afterworld
- Mandarangan: spirit of the sky and heat; also associated with smoke and fire; he is the chief of the 'mandarangan' gods named after him; he is good-hearted but can be wrathful if deceived or disappointed; his main festival is the Ginem or Kawayan; he also represents the waxing moon; together with Tuglibong, they represent totality; patron god of warriors married to Darago; resides at Mount Apo's summit; human sacrifices to him are rewarded with health, valor in war, and success in the pursuit of wealth he is also worshiped as 'Mandalangan' by the neighboring Kulaman people
- Darago: god of warriors married to Mandarangan; the goddess of women
- Mandarangan (general): war gods named after their chief, Mandarangan, god of the sky, heat, and warriors; inspired warriors to be imbued with their personal war spirit, as each warrior has a personal Mandarangan as their protector
- Buso: god of night and darkness; chief of an evil race called buso; he is ugly, dull, and sinister and is associated with chaos and lonely or uninhabited places; he is the patron of witches; he also represents the dark moon; together with Malaki, they represent totality
- Assistants of Pamulak Manobo
  - Tigyama: the god of protection; visited Lumabet, which resulted in the hero's journey
  - Malaki t’Olug Waig: also called Malaki t’ohu A’wig, the hero who destroyed sickness the god who opposes Buso; he is associated with light, mountains, depths, water, and fire; he is the chief of a good race called malaki; this god and his subjects are allies of mankind; he also taught mankind piety, obedience, the ways of life, and religion; he is also the patron of healers of shamans; he also represents the full moon; together with Buso, they represent totality
  - Tarabumo: deity for whom the rice ceremony is held
  - Panayaga: the god of brass casters
  - Abog: the god of hunters
  - Tonamaling: a deity who may be benevolent or malevolent
- Lumbat: a divinity of the skyworld who became a diwata when the chief deity cut out his intestines; eventually became the greatest of all Diwata
- Diwata (general): a class of deities; also a name associated with the chief deity
  - Salamiwan
  - Ubnuling
  - Tiun
  - Biat’odan
  - Biakapusad-an-Langit
  - Kadeyuna
  - Makali Lunson
  - Tolus ka balakat: the dweller of the ritual hanger
- Unnamed Gods: gods whose fire create smoke that becomes the white clouds, while the sun creates yellow clouds that make the colors of the rainbow
- Bia: sister of Malaki; the virgins who light up the candles of festivals and rituals depict the movements of Bia herself
- Apuy: spirit of the fire
- Unnamed Divinities: each realm in the skyrealms are ruled by a lesser divinity
- Taragomi: the god of crops
- Tolus ka Gomanan: the god of smiths
- Bait Pandi: the goddess of weavers who taught women weaving
- Sky Goddess: the sky herself; debated with Lumabet (Lumabat), until an agreement was reached, so that Lumabet and his people may enter the sky, except for the last man
- Father of Lumabet: was cut into many pieces many times under the order of Lumabet (Lumabat), until he became a small child
- Tagalion: son of Lumabet and searched for his father in Lumabet's abode underground; aided by white bees in finding his father in the sky
- Eels of Mount Apo: two giant eels, where one went east and arrived at sea, begetting all the eels of the world; the other went west, and remained on land until it died and became the western foothills of Mount Apo
- Limocan: a venerated omen bird, who warned a chief about the dangers during the rescue of the chief's kidnapped daughter

=== Mortals ===
- Lakivot: a giant civet who pursued the flowers of gold guarded by the one-eyed ogassi and witches called busaw; turned into a young man after his eyebrows were shaved
- Girl Companion of Lakivot: requested Lakivot to bring the flowers of gold, which later resulted into their marriage

== Blaan ==
=== Immortals ===
- Melu: the creator deity whose teeth are pure gold and whose skin is pure white; created humans with the god Tau Tana
- Dwata: the god of goodness; some sources say that the deity is older than Mele, although some say otherwise
- Mele: the god of evil; some sources say that the deity is oldern than Dwata, although some say otherwise
- Tau Tana: created humans with the god Melu amidst a great argument; put people's noses upside down, a mistake corrected by Melu; also called Tau Dalom Tana
- Tasu Weh: creator of humans in another myth, where humans had male sexual organs on one knee, and female sexual organs on the other
- Fiu Weh: the god who created modern humans by separating the sexual organs; also called Fiuwe
- Sawe: goddess who joined Melu to live in the world
- Diwata: goddess who joined Fiuwe to live in the sky
- Baswit: a primordial bird who lived on the first island as small as a hat called Salnaon; by the order of the gods, it brought earth, a fruit of rattan, and fruits of trees to Melu, who used the materials to create the world
- Fon Kayoo: spirit of the trees
- Fon Eel: spirit of water
- Fon Batoo: spirit of rocks and stones
- Tau Dalom Tala: spirit who lives in the underworld
- Loos Klagan: the most feared deity, uttering his name is considered a curse

=== Mortals ===
- Adnato: the first man
- Adwani: the first woman
- Tapi: child of Adnato and Adwani
- Lakarol: child of Adnato and Adwani
- Descendants of Tapi and Lakarol
  - Sinudal
  - Moay
  - Limbay
  - Madinda
  - Sinnamoway
  - Kamansa
  - Gilay
  - Gomayau
  - Salau
  - Slayen
  - Baen
  - Kanial
  - Latara

== T'boli ==
=== Immortals ===
- Bulon La Mogoaw: one of the two supreme deities; married to Kadaw La Sambad; lives in the seventh layer of the universe
- Kadaw La Sambad: one of the two supreme deities; married to Bulon La Mogoaw; lives in the seventh layer of the universe
- Cumucul: son of the supreme deities; has a cohort of fire, a sword and shield; married to Boi’Kafil
- Boi’Kafil: daughter of the supreme deities; married to Cumucul
- Bong Libun: daughter of the supreme deities; married to S’fedat; could not bear children
- S’fedat: son of the supreme deities; married to Bong Libun; could not bear children; asked Bong Libun to instead kill him, where his body became the land on which plants spout from
- D’wata: son of the supreme deities; married to both Sedek We and Hyu We; placed the land-body of S’fedat onto the sea
- Sedek We: daughter of the supreme deities; married to D’wata
- Hyu We: daughter of the supreme deities; married to D’wata
- Blotik: son of the supreme deities; married to S’lel
- S’lel: daughter of the supreme deities; married to Blotik
- B’lomi: daughter of the supreme deities; married to Mule
- Mule: son of the supreme deities; married to B’lomi
- Loos K’lagan: son of the supreme deities; married both La Fun and Datu B’noling
- La Fun: daughter of the supreme deities; married to Loos K’lagan
- Datu B’noling: daughter of the supreme deities; married to Loos K’lagan
- Children of D’wata and Hyu We
  - L’tik
  - B’langa
  - Temo Lus
  - T’dolok
  - Ginton
  - L’mugot M’ngay
  - Fun Bulol: the owner of wild animals
- Children of D’wata and Sedek We
  - Kayung
  - Slew
  - S’mbleng
  - Nagwawang
  - Nga Hule
  - S’ntan
- Fu: spirits that inhabit and own the natural environment
  - Fu El: the spirit of water
  - Fu El Melel: the spirit of the river
- D’wata (general): the general term for the gods; guard lives and determine fate and destiny
- Fu Dalu: the goddess of the abaca; speak and guide weavers on how to create patterns and designs, which are remembered in dreams
- Muhen: a bird god of fate whose song when heard is thought to presage misfortune; any undertaking is immediately abandoned or postponed when one hears the Muhen sing
- Glinton: the god of metalwork

== Teduray (Tiruray) ==
=== Immortals ===
- Tulus: referred as the Great Spirit, who was neither male nor female and created all things, including the forest, those that we see (such as humans), and those that we can't see (such as spirits) from mud; created and re-created humans four times, first due to the non-existence of humans, second due to birthing issues, the third due to Lageay Lengkuos's initiation of the ascending of mankind into the Great Spirit's realm which resulted into the absence of humans on earth, and the last due to another initiation of mankind's ascending to the sky world which made the same effect as the third; another name for Meketefu, but also a general term used to apply to the highest deity in each of the layers of the upper regions
- Minaden: creator of mankind, which was made from mud; creator of the earth put at the middle of daylight; provided mankind with their clothes and languages; her house welcomes living women who managed to arrive in the upper most level of the upper worlds
- Meketefu: the unapproachable brother of Minaden; also called Tulus, he corrected the sexual organs and noses of mankind; gave one group of people the monkey clothing which can turn anyone into monkeys, while gave another group bows and arrows
- Monkey Leader: also called Little Monkey, he is a culture hero who went to Tulus to intercede for his people, which resulted in his group to ascend the upper regions; two non-believer of his group were left on earth, but he returned to give them earth and a piece of iron which extended from earth to sky, which became the source of all iron
- Biaku: the magic bird who furnished the clothes and beads initiated by Minaden; when a neighboring people attacked the Teduray to take wealth, Biaku fled
- Metiatil: married to the hero Lageay Lengkuos; also referred to as Metiyatil Kenogan
- Lageay Lengkuos: the greatest of heroes and a shaman (beliyan) who made the earth and forests; the only one who could pass the magnet stone in the straight between the big and little oceans; inverted the directions where east became west, inverted the path of the sun, and made the water into land and land into water; also known as Lagey Lengkuwos, was impressed by the beauty of the region where the Great Spirit lives, and decided to take up his people there to live with the Great Spirit, leaving earth without humans
- Matelegu Ferendam: son of Lageay Lengkuos and Metiatil, although in some tales, he was instead birthed by Metiatil's necklace, Tafay Lalawan, instead
- Lageay Seboten: a poor breechcloth-wearing culture hero who carried a basket of camote and followed by his pregnant wife; made a sacred pilgrimage to Tulus, and awaits the arrival of a Teduray who would lead his people
- Mo-Sugala: father of Legeay Seboten who did not follow his son; loved to hunt with his dogs, and became a man-eater living in a cave
- Saitan: evil spirits brought by foreign priests
- Guru: leader of the Bolbol, a group of humans who can change into birds or whose spirits can fly at night to hunt humans
- Damangias: a spirit who would test righteous people by playing tricks on them
- Male Beliyan (Shamans)
  - Endilayag Belalà
  - Endilayag Kerakam
  - Lagey Bidek Keroon
  - Lagey Fegefaden
  - Lagey Lindib Lugatu
  - Lagey Titay Beliyan
  - Omolegu Ferendam
- Female Beliyan (Shamans)
  - Kenogon Enggulon
  - Bonggo Solò Delemon
  - Kenogon Sembuyaya
  - Kenogon Dayafan
  - Bonggo Matir Atir
  - Kenogon Enggerayur
- Segoyong: guardians of the classes of natural phenomena; punishes humans to do not show respect and steal their wards; many of them specialize in a class, which can be water, trees, grasses, caves behind waterfalls, land caves, snakes, fire, nunuk trees, deer, and pigs; there were also Segoyang of bamboo, rice, and rattan; caretakers of various aspects of nature
  - Segoyong of Land Caves: take the form of a feared snake known a humanity's grandparent; cannot be killed for he is the twin of the first people who was banished for playfully roughly with his sibling
  - Segoyong of Pigs: takes its share of butterflies in the forest; feared during night hunts
  - Segoyong of Deer: can change humans into deer and man-eaters; feared during night hunts
  - Segoyong of Sickness: sends sickness to humans because in the early years, humans were not nice to him; talking about him is forbidden and if one should refer to him, a special sign of surrender is conducted
- Woman at Bonggo: the woman at Bonggo who gathers the spirits at the land of the dead in the sky; keeps the spirit of the body
- Woman beyond Bonggo: the woman beyond Bonggo who keeps the spirit of the umbilical cord
- Brother of Tulus: lives in the highest abode in the land of the dead, where those who died in battle reside
- Maginalao: beings of the upper regions who can aid someone to go up in the upper worlds without dying, where usually a female aids a person first, followed by her brother; they sometimes come to earth to aid the poor and the suffering
- Giant of Chasms: the first one to guard the chasms between the layers of the upper regions; a man-eating giant
- Spirit of Lightning and Thunder: advises humans about good and bad, to not tease animals, and to respect elders and ancestors
- Spirit Who Turns Earth into Water: advises humans about good and bad, to not tease animals, and to respect elders and ancestors
- One Who Forces the Truth
- One of Oratory
- Settlers of the Mountains: each of the eight layers of the upper regions have eight spirits referred as Settlers of the Mountains; they are four men and four women who are appealed to for pity in order to get to the highest ranking spirit in a layer
- Spirit of the Stars: a spirit higher in rank than the Settlers of the Mountains
- Spirit of the Umbilical Cord: the woman beside the deity Meketefu (Tulus); hardest to get pity from as the people were once unkind to her
- Malang Batunan: a giant who had a huge house; keep the souls of any false shamans from passing through the region of the Great Spirit
- Major constellation deities: six constellations asked by the hero Lagey Lingkuwus to remain in the sky to aid in the people's farming
  - Fegeferafad: the leader of the constellations; actual name is Keluguy, the fatherly figure for the cousins Kufukufu, Baka, and Seretar; shaped like a human, the deity has a headcloth and chicken wings on his head, symbolizing courage
  - Kufukufu: one of the three cousins who view both Fegeferafad and Singkad as their fatherly figures
  - Baka: one of the three cousins who view both Fegeferafad and Singkad as their fatherly figures
  - Seretar: one of the three cousins who view both Fegeferafad and Singkad as their fatherly figures
  - Singkad: spouse of Kenogon; another fatherly figure for the cousins Kufukufu, Baka, and Seretar
  - Kenogon: spouse of Singkad; has a comb, which is always near Singkad
- Diwata: a great eight-headed fish

=== Mortals ===
- Flood Couple: after the great flood, a Teduray boy and Dulungan girl survived and married; their offspring who took after their father became the Teduray, while those who took after their mother became the Dulungan, who were later absorbed by the Manobo
- Mamalu: an ancestor of the Teduray; the elder sibling who went into the mountains to remain with the native faith; brother of Tambunaoway, ancestor of the Maguindanao
- Tambunaoway: an ancestor of the Maguindanao; the younger sibling who went remained in the lowlands and welcomed a foreign faith; brother of Mamalu, ancestor of the Teduray
- First Humans: the first couple's child died and from the infant's body, sprouted various plants and lime
- Pounding Woman: a woman who was pounding rice one day that she hit the sky with her pestle, which shamed the sky, causing it to go higher
- Alagasi: giant humans from western lands who eat smaller humans
- Tigangan: giants who take corpses, and transform these corpse into whatever they want to eat
- Siring: dwarfs of the nunuk trees

== Maguindanao ==
=== Immortals ===
- Tohan: the supreme deity who is far way, and so lesser divinities and spirits hear people's prayers instead; was also later called as Allah by Muslim converts
- Dewa: a goddess; statues are called diwata
- Malaykat: each person is protected by these angelic beings from illness; they also guide people in work, making humans active, diligent, and good; they do not talk nor borrow a voice from humans, and they don't treat sick persons
- Tunung: spirits who live in the sky, water, mountain, or trees; listens to prayers and can converse with humans by borrowing the voice of a medium; protects humans from sickness and crops from pests
- Cotabato Healer Monkey: a monkey who lived near a pond outside Cotabato city; it heals those who touch it and those who give it enough offerings
- Patakoda: a giant stallion whose presence at the Pulangi river is an omen for an unfortunate event
- Datu na Gyadsal: the chief adversary, who was also later called as Satan by Muslim converts; also called as Iblis by Muslim converts; offering are given to this spirit to appease and prevent it from performing calamities
- Saitan: possessing spirits
- Spirit of the Rainbow: a spirit who may cut the finger of those who use their index finger to point at the rainbow
- Jinn: a group of celestial beings
- Bantugen: an epic hero-god and the god of forefathers who the masses look up to and trust
- Leping: the twin-spirit of an infant
- Apo: ancestral spirits who take the role of intermediaries who overcome evil spirits
- Pagari: also called Inikadowa, the twin-spirit who is sometimes in the form of a crocodile; if a person is possessed by them, the person will attain the gift of healing
- Mela: a golden bird who was give life by the gabi water; ridden by the son of Nabi Bakar, picking up one of the golden fish of the lake; can disguise itself as a girl

=== Mortals ===
- Tarabusao: a half-man, half-horse giant monster who rules Mindanao and feasted on male human flesh, which caused many to escape into the island of Mantapuli; beheaded by Skander
- Skander: the ruler of Mantapuli and an epic hero who went on a quest to slay the monster Tarabusao
- Bai Labi Mapanda: the fairest lady of Mantapuli who is married to Skander
- Kalanganan Kapre: a good giant who provided the people of Kalanganan I with security, guarding them against bad elements; eventually left Kalanganan when his home near the Pulangi river was cut down due to a surge in human population
- Rajah Indarapatra: brother of Rajah Solayman; gave his ring and sword called Jurul Pakal to his brother, who went on a quest to defeat the monsters in Maguindanao; also planted a tree which would only die if Rajah Solayman dies; searched for his brother, who he revived using heaven-sent waters at Mount Gurayn; he afterwards went into his own quest, where he slayed a seven-headed monster; he eventually returned to Mantapoli
- Rajah Solayman: brother of Rajah Indarapatra; went on a quest to defeat various monsters; slayed Kurita, Tarabusar, and Pah, but died when Pah's weight crushed him; revived when Rajah Indarapatra poured heaven-sent waters onto his bones, where afterwards, Rajah Solayman returned to Mantapoli
- Kurita: an amphibious animal with several limbs and lived on land and sea; haunts Mount Kabalalan, and slayed by Rajah Solayman; sometimes depicted as an octopus
- Tarabusar: a humongous human-like creature who lived in Mount Matutum; slayed by Rajah Solayman
- Pah: a bird of prey as big as a house and whose wings caused darkness on the ground; lives in Mount Bita and slayed by Rajah Solayman at Mount Gurayn
- Monster of Mount Gurayn: a seven-headed monster at Mount Gurayn, who was slayed by Rajah Indarapatra
- Wife of Rajah Indarapatra: daughter of a local ruler who hid in a cave due to the number of monsters in Maguindanao; married to Rajah Indarapatra and gave birth to their children; they were entrusted to her father, the local ruler, after Rajah Indarapatra returned to Mantapoli
- Tambunaoway: an ancestor of the Maguindanao; the younger sibling who went remained in the lowlands and welcomed a foreign faith; brother of Mamalu, ancestor of the Teduray
- Mamalu: an ancestor of the Teduray; the elder sibling who went into the mountains to remain with the native faith; brother of Tambunaoway, ancestor of the Maguindanao

== Maranao ==
=== Immortals ===
- Tohan: the supreme deity who is perfect, having no defect; can cause and stop earthquakes and pestilence; later also called as Allah by Muslim converts
- Sun Deity: divine being depicted in an anthropomorphic form as a flaming young man; angels serve as his charioteers
- Moon Deity: divine being depicted in an anthropomorphic form as a beautiful young woman; angels serve as her charioteers
- Jinn: beings who live in the atmosphere which serves as a buffer zone between the skyworld and the earth, called Oraonan a Lantoy, known for possessing a garden of flowers and vegetables
- Walain sa Letingan: the princess-goddess living in a skyworld region called Magoyeda a Selegen
- Papanok sa Aras: children who died prematurely and were transformed into birds of paradise living in the skyworld region called Sorga
- Houris: heavenly maidens blessed with eternal beauty and perpetual virginity
- Lumpong: a large animal who carries the earth; accompanied by a small shrimp that sometimes claws on the earth-holder from time to time, causing the phenomena of earthquakes
- Sakar: a monster in the underworld where disrespectful children are trapped in its belly
- Walain Katolosan: the goddess who owns the amulet Sikag a Makaombaw
- Tonong: divine spirits who often aid heroes; often lives in nonok trees, seas, lakes, and the sky realm
  - Apo: benign tornado and waterspout spirits; a classification of tonong; they are the ancestral spirits tasked to kill or drive away evil spirits
  - Sakit: maligant harmful spirits responsible for diseases; a classification of tonong
  - Saitan: malignant possessing spirits; a classification of tonong
  - Inikadowa: the benign spirit double or guardian of a person, who is with the person when the baby is born; a classification of tonong; the placenta is their manifestation
  - Tolos: a class of tonong who inhabit the sky realms; prayed to, especially in times of battle and protection for quests; referred to as gods
- Pinatola’ a Tonong: the ancestor of all unseen benevolent spirits; a tonong who takes the form of a gigantic crocodile at sea, a garuda in air, and a giant on land; a guardian spirit of Diwata Ndaw Gibon
- Pinatoli i Kilid: a tonong who takes the form of a gigantic crocodile; the guardian spirit of the king of Bemberan, Diwata Ndaw Gibon; clashed with Ladalad a Madali, grandson of Gibon; later gave valuable information to Madali; during the battle of Madali and Pirimbingan, Madali was aided by Pinatoli i Kilid against Pirimbingan's spirit guardian, Magolaing sa Ragat
- Magolaing sa Ragat: a tonong of the enchantress Walain Pirimbangan; took the form of a gigantic crocodile
- Sikag a Makaombaw: the intelligent and independent tonong (spirit) living within the Sikag a Makaombaw amulet, regarded as the most powerful amulet of all due to its ability to grant its wielder authority over all tonong
- Salindagaw Masingir: a tonong of the hero Awilawil o Ndaw; acts as the guardian-spirit of the kingdom of Kaibat a Kadaan
- Walain sa Lekepen: a goddess courted by the hero Bantogen
- Diwata ko sa Magaw: spirit of destruction; a tolos or deity
- Mino’aw a Minepen: powerful spirit of the sky; a tolos or deity
- Naga: dragons who repel evil spirits; a specific huge Naga is said to encircle the world
- Sarimanok: sacred omen birds
- Arimaonga: a giant lion who causes lunar eclipses
- Gabriel: an angel who reported to the supreme deity the overpopulation of the kingdom of Mantapoli, which resulted in its transfer and the creation of Lake Lanao
- Malakal Maut: the angel of death; takes the souls of someone after three to seven days from the falling of the person's leaf from the sacred Sadiarathul Montaha tree in the realm called Sorga. Appears either a handsome prince or a grotesque monster, depending if the soul he is getting came from a sinner or a virtuous person. Punishes the souls of sinners until final judgment, while lifting up the souls of the good into heaven
- Tonong of Lake Lanao: there are many tonong of Lake Lanao, who are invoked during certain rituals such as the kashawing rice ritual
  - Taraka
  - Babowa
  - Mipesandalan of Masiu
- Pagali: supernatural crocodiles

=== Mortals ===
- Aya Diwata Mokom sa Kaadiong a Lopa: father of the three rulers of the three kingdoms from the Darangen; a half-tonong and a half-human
- Daromoyod an Olan: mother of the three rulers of the three kingdoms from the Darangen; a half-jinn and a half-human
- Rulers of the Three Main Kingdoms from the Darangen: all three are siblings
  - Diwata Ndaw Gibon: a semi-divine hero who ruled the kingdom of Iliyan a Bembaran, which was a favord abode of the tonong; had two sons with his head-wife Aya Panganay Bai, and a total of five daughters from five other wives
  - Awilawil o Ndaw: a semi-divine hero who ruled the kingdom of Kaibat a Kadaan
  - Dalondong a Mimbantas: a semi-divine hero ruled the kingdom of Gindolongan Marogong, which possessed the enchanted river Pagayawan that refuses to flow without the presence of thunder
- Aya Panganay Bai: married to Diwata Ndaw Gibon, who she has two sons; came from a place known as Minango’aw a Ronong
- Tominaman sa Rogong: firstborn son of Diwata Ndaw Gibon and Aya Panganay Bai; succeeded his father as ruler of Iliyan a Bembaran
- Magondaya’ Boisan: secondborn son Diwata Ndaw Gibon and Aya Panganay Bai; expanded the kingdom of Bembaran together with his brother-king, Tominaman sa Rogong
- Pasandalan a Rogong: son of Tominaman sa Rogong
- Bantogen: son of Tominaman sa Rogong; he courted the goddess Walain sa Lekepen, and was assumed missing by his people, leading to a search journey; returned with Madali to their kingdom
- Ladalad a Madali: son of Magondaya’ Boisan; went into a journey to rescue his cousin Bantugen, and all those who first came to find Bantugen; can become invisible with the aided of his guardian spirits; aided by his grandfather's guardian spirit Pinatoli i Kilid who clashed with the Walain Pirimbangan's guardian spirit; shapeshifted into a woman to take the amulet of the goddess Walain Katolosan, foiling the plan of Pirimbangan
- Walain Pirimbangan: an enchantress from Danalima’ a Rogong who imprisoned Bantugen and all the leaders of Bembaran who rescued him; aided by her guardian spirit, Magolaing sa Ragat
- Maharadia Lawana: a man with eight heads who was banished for his bad mouth; tried to kill himself, but survived upon the intervention of the angel Gabriel
- Kapmadali: a hero who battled Pinatola’ a Tonong
- Pilandok: a cunning man who tricked various people from a blind man to a kingdom's ruler
- Rajah Indarapatra: ancestor of both tonong and the Maranao; a child of heaven who chose to be reincarnated as a mortal son of the ruler Nabi Bakaramat; brother of Rajah Solaiman; before Rajah Solaiman went into a journey, Rajah Indarapatra planted a kilala sapling whose vitality is interpreted as Rajah Solaiman's life; when the plant died, Rajah Solaiman avenged his brother's death and slayed Omakaan without cutting the monster
- Rajah Solaiman: went into a journey to slay Omakaan, but was killed by Omakaan
- Laughing Woman: a woman who told Rajah Indarapatra what not to do to kill Omakaan
- Omakaan: a man-eating monster who multiplies when cut into pieces
- Kalalanagan: also called Princess Condor; all her previous husbands except Inodang died because she is the source of mosquitoes, which come from her nose
- Inodang: the last husband of Kalalanagan; burned Kalalanagan to prevent more deaths, but some of Kalalanagan's mosquitoes escaped, which means Kalalanagan still lives
- Turtle and Snake: friends who went into a race, where the patient turtle won
- Lapindig: husband of Orak and Odang; upon finding his wives' death, he tightened his waist to stave off hunger and became the wasp
- Orak: wife of Lapindig, killed herself after Odang's death
- Odang: wife of Lapindig, accidentally died due to a quarrel with Orak about cooking and transporting food for Lapindig
- Semsem sa Alongan: a magician; husband of Anak
- Anak: wife of Semsem sa Alongan and youngest daughter of Sultan sa Agamaniyog; died due to a plan of Potre Bunso, where Anak was grounded by stone doors due to her failure to ask permission from Ring of Fire, Sharp and Pointed Metals, and Flowing River; her long hair became the leaves of the sapinit
- Potre Bunso: jealous sister of Anak's good fortune
- Tingting a Bulawan: sister of Anak

== Yakan ==
=== Immortals ===
- Baira: the great female ancestor who defined each community's unrestricted and nonlineal descent
- Saytan: various spirits in heaven and in the natural environment
- Malikidjabania: angels and spirits that have certain ownership and rights over children born either during the month of Sappal or any Saturday of the year; has serpent forms, and can be spoken with using a ritual with the aim of releasing their hold on a child

== Tausug ==
=== Immortals ===
- Supreme Couple: the supreme deities whose marriage caused rain to exist, imparting life to the soil where plants eventually grew
  - Indira Suga: the supreme sun goddess
  - Jamiyun Kulisa: the supreme thunderbolt god
- Tuan Masha’ika: son of Indira Suga and Jamiyun Kulisa; he came out from a stalk of bamboo and is hailed as the people's prophet
- Indra: deity of the sky
- Agni: deity of fire
- Vayu: deity of the wind
- Surya: deity of the sun
- Biraddali: angelic beings with the shining beauty of the rainbow; they can take away their wings to bath in springs
- Saitan: spirits who are given offerings during the cultivation of rice and other occasions; can bring misfortune, and thus are warded off from housing sites
- Sumayang Galura: the largest and greatest of all birds; wanted to overthrow a monarch, but was defeated by Bulantuk
- Bulantuk: the smallest of all birds; a hero who defeated Sumayang Galura, saving Sumayang Galura from death in the process
- Munkal: the being who takes the dead to the afterlife, where the right path leads to heaven and the left path leads to hell

=== Mortals ===
- Sipad the Older: an ancestor of Sulu's rulers
- Sipad the Younger: the ruler who met Tuan Masha’ika
- Iddha: daughter of Sipad the Younger; married Tuan Masha’ika
- Orangkaya Su’il: a ruler who had good relations with the ruler of Manila
- Bakakka: the kingfisher
- Bugguk: the heron who was awarded the seashore
- Bubulantuk: the woodpecker who was awarded a red cap
- Tihilaw: the oriole who was awarded a yellow dress
- Sambulaan: the hawk

== Sama-Bajau ==
=== Immortals ===
- Dayang Dayang Mangilai: the goddess of the forest and one of the two supreme deities; married to Umboh Tuhan
- Umboh Tuhan: also called Umboh Dilaut, the god of the sea and one of the two supreme deities; married to Dayang Dayang Mangilai; creator deity who made humans equal with animals and plants; also simply called as Tuhan
- Primordial Stingray: the gigantic ancient stingray which towed the Sama-Bajau to land
- Naga: a gigantic dragon suspended in the sky; shoots pillars of fire from its eyes and excretes poison from its forked tongue; prophesied to descend on earth again to devour the wicked
- Umboh: the mediator between Tuhan and the people
- Umboh (general): a term sometimes used to encompass Umboh, Saitan, and Jinn spirits
  - Umboh (general): ancestral spirits
  - Saitan: nature spirits
  - Jinn: familiar spirits
- Umboh Baliyu: spirits of wind and storms
- Umboh Payi: also called Umboh Gandum, the spirits of the first rice harvest
- Umboh Summut: totem of ants
- Umboh Kamun: totem of mantis shrimp
- Sumangâ: spirit of sea vessels; the guardian who deflects attacks
- Bansa: ancestral ghosts
- Tuan Laut: the principal spirit of trees where offerings for the Bansa are placed
- Burak: a being with a human face and a deer-sized body of a horse; its sweats drop like mother-of-pearls, its saddle is ornamented by rubies, and its eyes shine like the sun
- Kasagan: unseen spirits
- Omboh Adam: later associated as the highest male spirit of dead ancestors due to Muslim influences; messenger of the supreme deity
- Awa: later associated as the highest female spirit of dead ancestors dye to Muslim influences
- Niyawa: spirits
- Munkal: the being who takes the dead to the afterlife, where the right path leads to heaven and the left path leads to hell
- Bakunawa: a snake that swallows the moon during eclipses in Abaknon beliefs

=== Mortals ===
- Abak: the king of a people who inhabited Balabac; led his people's migration to Capul island, where their descendants now reside
- Bakakka: the kingfisher
- Bugguk: the heron who was awarded the seashore
- Bubulantuk: the woodpecker who was awarded a red cap
- Tihilaw: the oriole who was awarded a yellow dress
- Sambulaan: the hawk
