= Advocates of Science and Technology for the People =

Non-governmental organization based in the Philippines

Agham - Advocates of Science & Technology for the People
- Samahan ng Nagtataguyod ng Agham at Teknolohiya Para sa Sambayanan
- Formation: 24 July 1999
- Founder: Aloysius Baes; Giovanni Tapang
- Founded at: Diliman, Quezon City, Philippines
- Type: Non-governmental organization
- Purpose: Citizen science Environmentalism; Food security
- Headquarters: Quezon City, Philippines
- Methods: Environmental impact assessment
- Secretary General: Feny Cosico
- Chairman: Giovanni Tapang, PhD
- Affiliations: Makabayan; Bayan Muna; ILPS; IPCM
- Website: agham.org

Advocates of Science and Technology for the People (Filipino: Samahan ng Nagtataguyod ng Agham at Teknolohiya Para sa Sambayanan), or simply Agham (lit. 'Science'), is a non-governmental science advocacy organization based in the Philippines. Founded in 1999 by professors and students of the University of the Philippines Diliman, the group focuses its campaigns and community service in the areas of food security, public utilities, environment, national industrialization, science education, and the welfare of scientists in the country.

The group is notable for its promotion of citizen science and is very vocal regarding many issues confronting the country. Agham regularly conducts fact finding missions of environmental disasters in cooperation with sectoral organizations, particularly peasants’ and workers’ groups.

Agham is affiliated with the Bagong Alyansang Makabayan (BAYAN), a coalition of progressive organizations and openly supports Bayan Muna Partylist of the Makabayan bloc in the Philippine Congress. Agham should not be confused with AGHAM Partylist, a political party founded in 2005 of which the former has no affiliation with.

== History ==
Agham was founded on July 24, 1999, by Dr. Aloysius Baes, an environmental chemist and Martial Law activist and Dr. Giovanni Tapang, a physicist. Dr. Baes greatly influenced the formulation of the five concerns that the organization would focus on: environment, public utilities, food security and self-sufficiency, scientific and mass culture and national industrialization. In addition, Agham would strive to promote the welfare of Filipino scientists.

== Notable campaigns ==
Justice for Leonard Co Movement

Agham is a convener of the Justice for Leonard Co Movement (JLM). Leonard Co, a Filipino botanist was shot to death in November 2010, along with two others by soldiers of the Philippine Army whilst doing a study on the flora of Kananga, Leyte. Co was considered as the foremost authority in ethnobotany in the Philippines. Agham together with 14 other organizations conducted a fact-finding mission, which resulted in the formation of a coalition consisting of Co's family, friends, and supporters as well as concerned civil-society groups.

In a resolution dated December 20, 2012, the Department of Justice (DOJ) recommended the filing of reckless imprudence resulting in homicide against the accused soldiers, instead of the murder charge recommended by the Commission on Human Rights (CHR). Agham and JLM have accused the DOJ of downgrading the case. In 2013 the family of Leonard Co filed for a review of the DOJ recommendation as well as a change of venue to the Supreme Court.

== Field investigations ==
Padcal Mining Spill

In August 2012, amid strong rains, the Tailings Pond 3 (TP3) of Philex Mining Corporation (PMC) in Itogon, Benguet, collapsed, spilling mine tailings into the surroundings. Four other spills occurred up until the following month, spilling some 20.6 million metric tons of sediments into nearby water channels. The Department of Environment and Natural Resources (DENR) deemed the breach as the biggest mining disaster the country has seen in terms of volume.

An environmental investigative mission (EIM) was conducted by Agham along with other concerned groups in October of the same year. The investigation concluded that the nearby Balog River was biologically dead. The organizations involved in the EIM eventually brought the issue to the Senate.

== International relations ==
Agham is a member of the International League of Peoples' Struggle (ILPS). In 2001 its co-founded Study Commission 13 of the ILPS on science, technology and the environment. In 2009 AGHAM was a co-organizer of the People's Action on Climate Change, an international campaign initiative on climate change.

Agham is also the co-founder of the International Alliance Against Agrochemical Transnational Corporations (IAAATNCs) and the Climate Change Learning Initiative Mobilizing Action for Transforming Environments in Asia Pacific (CLIMATE Asia Pacific), a network of NGOs engaged in climate change and education for sustainable development.

In 2015 Agham was among the organizers of the International People's Conference on Mining (IPCM), a gathering of people's organizations, support groups, community leaders, environmental defenders, human rights activists, Church workers, students, peoples' lawyers and scientists, and other individuals and groups opposed to large-scale mining.

In May 2015, Agham was elected as the Focal Point of the Science and Technology Constituency of the Asia Pacific Regional CSO Engagement Mechanism (APRCEM). APRCEM is a platform where civil society organizations can coordinate with governments at the regional and global levels. APRCEM was set-up under the auspices of the United Nations Economic and Social Commission for Asia and the Pacific (UNESCAP).

Agham is also a member of international networks such as the Pesticide Action Network and Water for the People Network.
