= Philippine High School for the Arts =

Public high school in Laguna, Philippines

- Mataas na Paaralan ng Pilipinas para sa mga Sining

- National Arts Center

Location
- Los Baños, Laguna; Philippines; 14°09′14″N 121°12′58″E

Information
- Type: Public arts high school
- Established: June 11, 1977 (Enacting Legislation in 1978)
- Campus Director: Josue Greg M. Zuniega
- Grades: 7 to 12
- Gender: Co-ed
- Enrollment: 200–210
- Campus: National Arts Center; Mount Makiling
- Colors: Blue, Red and Yellow
- Budget: ₱114.75 million (2021)
- Affiliations: Department of Education; National Commission for Culture and the Arts; Cultural Center of the Philippines
- Website: www.phsa.edu.ph

The Philippine High School for the Arts (PHSA; Filipino: Mataas na Paaralan ng Pilipinas para sa mga Sining) is a specialized public high school in the Philippines that offers arts-focused education. It was established in 1978 by virtue of Presidential Decree No. 1287. The school is an attached agency of the Department of Education and coordinates with the Cultural Center of the Philippines on the implementation of its arts program. In addition to the basic education curriculum prescribed by the government, it offers various specializations in the field of arts. Admission to the school is highly competitive. At any given time, it has a student population of 130–145. Students accepted into the PHSA receive full scholarships and living assistance. Its campus is located in the National Arts Center on Mount Makiling, Los Baños, Laguna.

== Academics and student life ==
Every year, the school opens its application process through the Annual Nationwide Search for Young Arts Scholars (ANSYAS). Applicants must be graduating Filipino elementary school students not more than 14 years old with outstanding abilities in the arts. Once accepted, students undergo basic education classes in the morning and specialized instruction in the afternoon. There are currently five fields of specialization that the school offers:

- Creative Writing
- Dance (Folk and Ballet)
- Music
- Theater Arts
- Visual Arts

It is estimated that the government spends around Ph₱ 500,000.00 (US$11,000 in 2012) per student in his or her stay in the school. Upon graduation, scholars pursuing higher education are obligated to enroll in an arts course. Similar to other specialized schools, graduating batches have names. The first batch that graduated in 1979 was named in honor of National Artist Guillermo Tolentino.

== Controversy ==
Due to numerous sexual abuse allegations, DepEd insisted and requested help from the NBI to investigate the school immediately in accordance with the letter sent by Vice President and Secretary of Education Sara Duterte on July 11, 2022.

At the end of the investigation, the NBI identified three suspects: a senior student, a teacher, and a male dormitory parent. The school administration also responded to the issue saying that they will ensure that this will not happen again and promised to provide a good learning environment for their students.

== Notable alumni ==
- Rowena Arrieta, concert pianist
- Leila Florentino, lead singer, performer in the Broadway-run Miss Saigon.
- Grace S. Nono, singer, ethnomusicologist, and cultural activist
- Diwa de Leon, film composer, musician & YouTube artist
- Shamaine Centenera, actress for stage, film, and television
- Cherrie Pinpin, PH first Female Paralympic Sailor & Para World Sailing Champion
- Elijah Canlas - Actor, Gawad Pasado 2020 Best Supporting Actor (Edward), 17th Asian Film Festival 2020 Best Actor (Kalel, 15), 43rd Gawad Urian Best Actor (Kalel, 15), 68th FAMAS Award Best Actor (Kalel, 15)
- Tommy Alejandrino - Actor, 18th Cinemalaya Independent Film Festival Best Actor (The Baseball Player)
- Nina Ricci Alagao, beauty queen, visual artist
- Kerima Lorena Tariman, poet, activist
