= Immaculate Conception Parish Church (Los Baños) =

Roman Catholic church in Laguna, Philippines

Los Baños Church
- Immaculate Conception Parish Church
- Simbahan ng Parokya ng Immaculada Concepcion (Filipino); Ecclesia Parœcialis de Conceptio Immaculata Beata Virgo Maria, v.d. 'Aguas Santas' in urbs Los Baños (Latin)
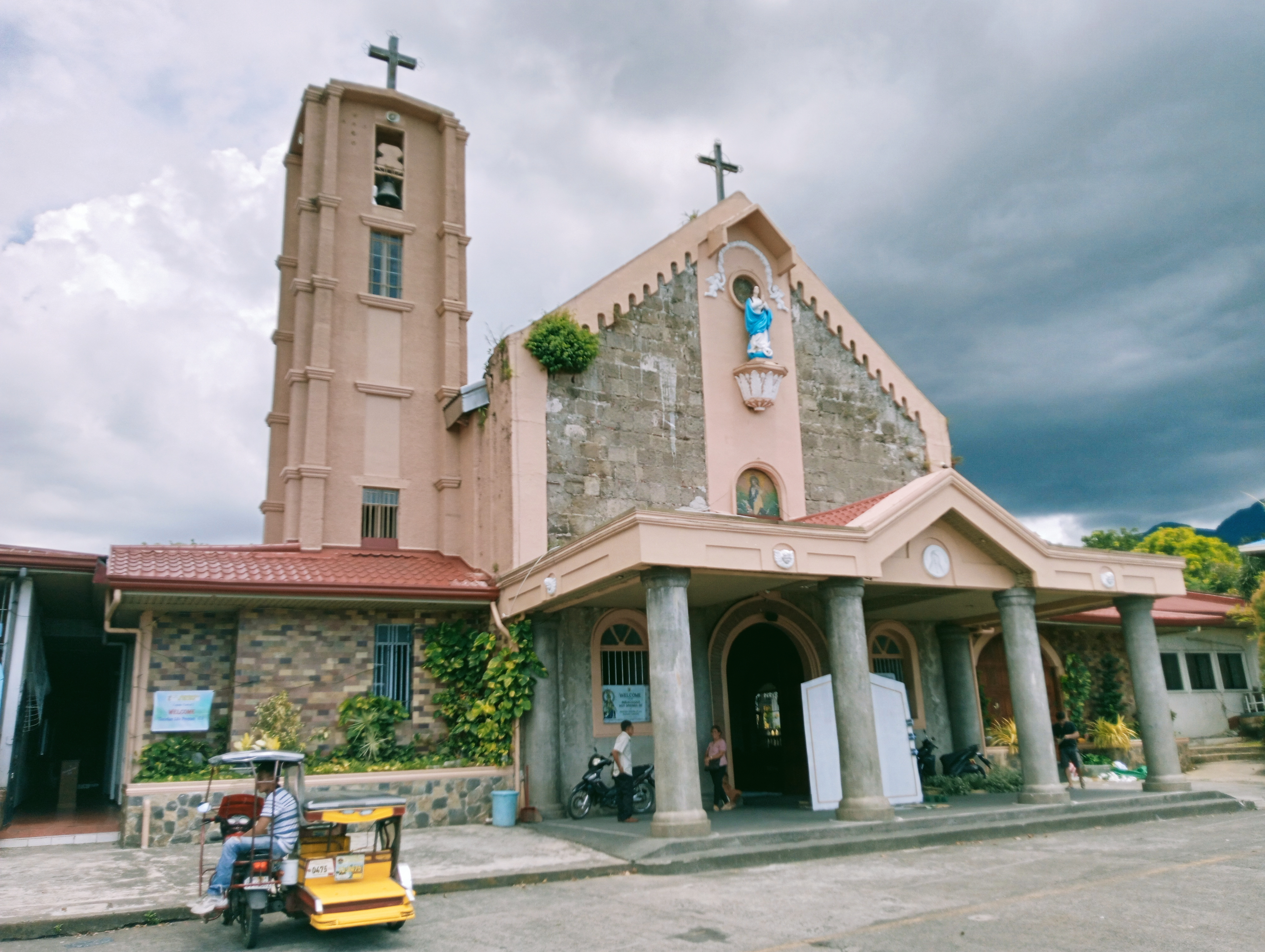
- Church facade in 2023

- Location in Laguna Location in Luzon Location in the Philippines
- 14°10′43″N 121°13′19″E
- Location: Poblacion, Los Baños, Laguna
- Country: Philippines
- Denomination: Roman Catholic

History
- Status: Parish church
- Founded: 1613
- Founder: San Pedro Bautista
- Dedication: Nuestra Señora de Aguas Santas

Architecture
- Functional status: Active
- Architectural type: Church building
- Style: Baroque
- Groundbreaking: 1727
- Completed: 1790

Specifications
- Materials: Sand, gravel, cement, wood, and bricks

Administration
- Province: Manila
- Metropolis: Manila
- Archdiocese: Manila
- Diocese: San Pablo
- Deanery: Immaculate Conception

Clergy
- Priest: Jose D. Barrion

Immaculate Conception Parish Church is the oldest Roman Catholic church in the municipality of Los Baños, Laguna, Philippines. Its titular is Nuestra Señora de Aguas Santas (Our Lady of Holy Waters) and its feast is celebrated every December 8. The church is under the jurisdiction of the Diocese of San Pablo.

== History ==
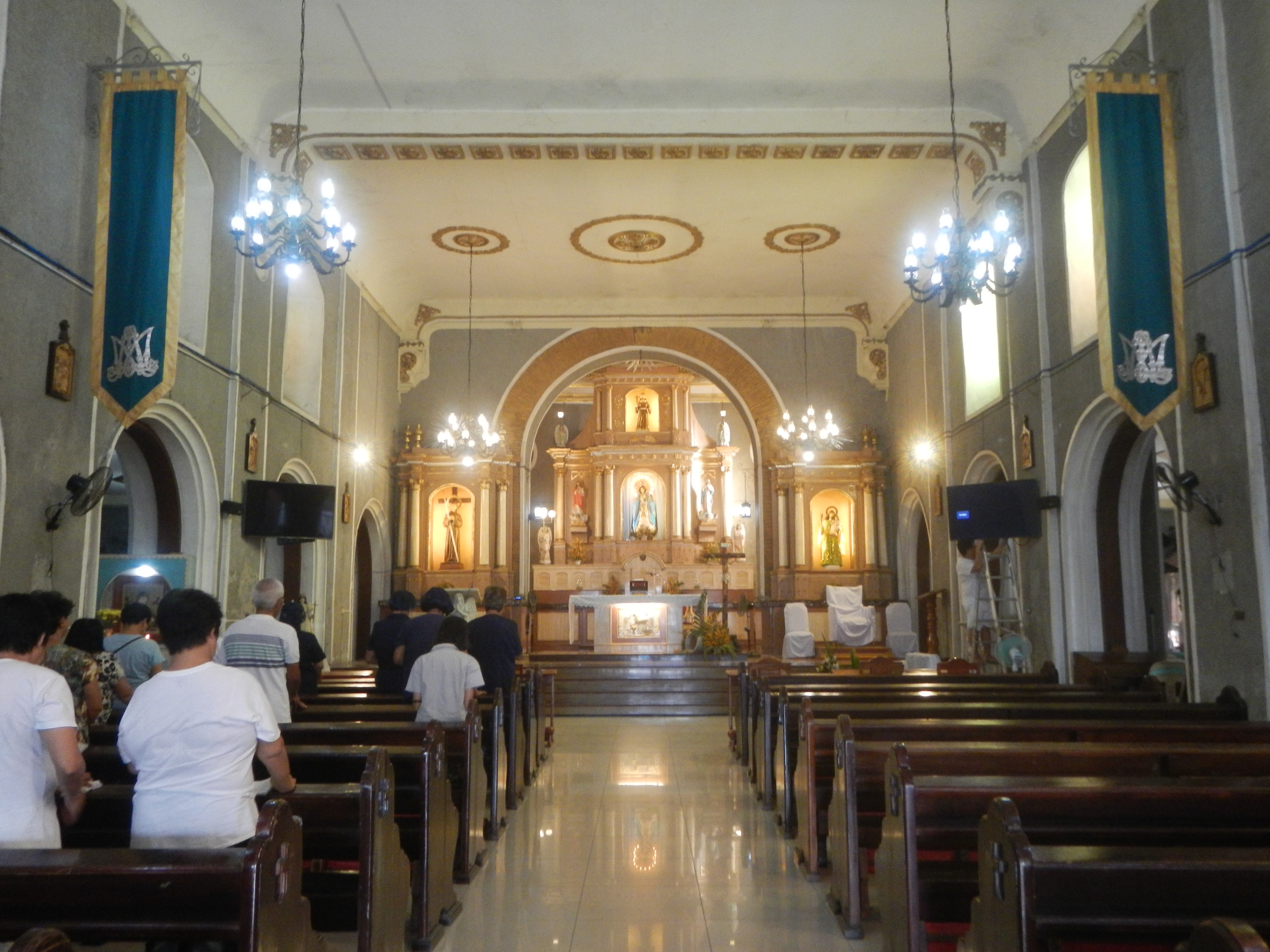
Church interior in 2019

The town of Los Baños started as a visita of Bay under the Augustinian order with San Nicolas de Tolentino as the titular saint. In 1590, Franciscans replaced the Augustinians in their missions with Pedro Bautista y Blasquez, later canonized as San Pedro Bautista. He discovered numerous hot springs in the area which locals called Maynit. He created a public bath he called the Los Baños. After twenty years, the Franciscans established a temporary convent to administer the hot springs that were popular for healing illnesses. A small hospital chapel was built in 1613 in the absence of a church until 1727 dedicated to 'La Purisima Concepcion', with the title Aguas Santas. It was brought down by fire in 1727. A temporary chapel was built out of nipa and cane which was later destroyed again by fire. A big stone church was built in 1790 by Rev. Fr. Domingo Mateo in its present site. The belfry, sacristy and tile roofing were supervised by Rev. Fr. Manuel Amat in 1851 and the convent in 1852. The convent and bell tower were destroyed during the 1863 earthquake but repairs were made during the administration of Rev. Fr. Manuel Rodriguez and Rev. Fr. Gilberto Martin in 1880. It was also used in World War II by the Japanese occupying forces as a garrison and headquarters.

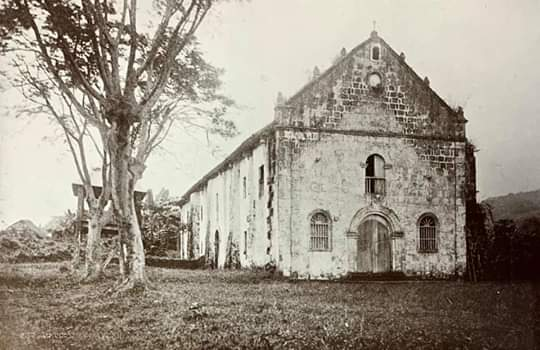
Iglesia Parroqual de Nuestra Señora de Aguas Santas

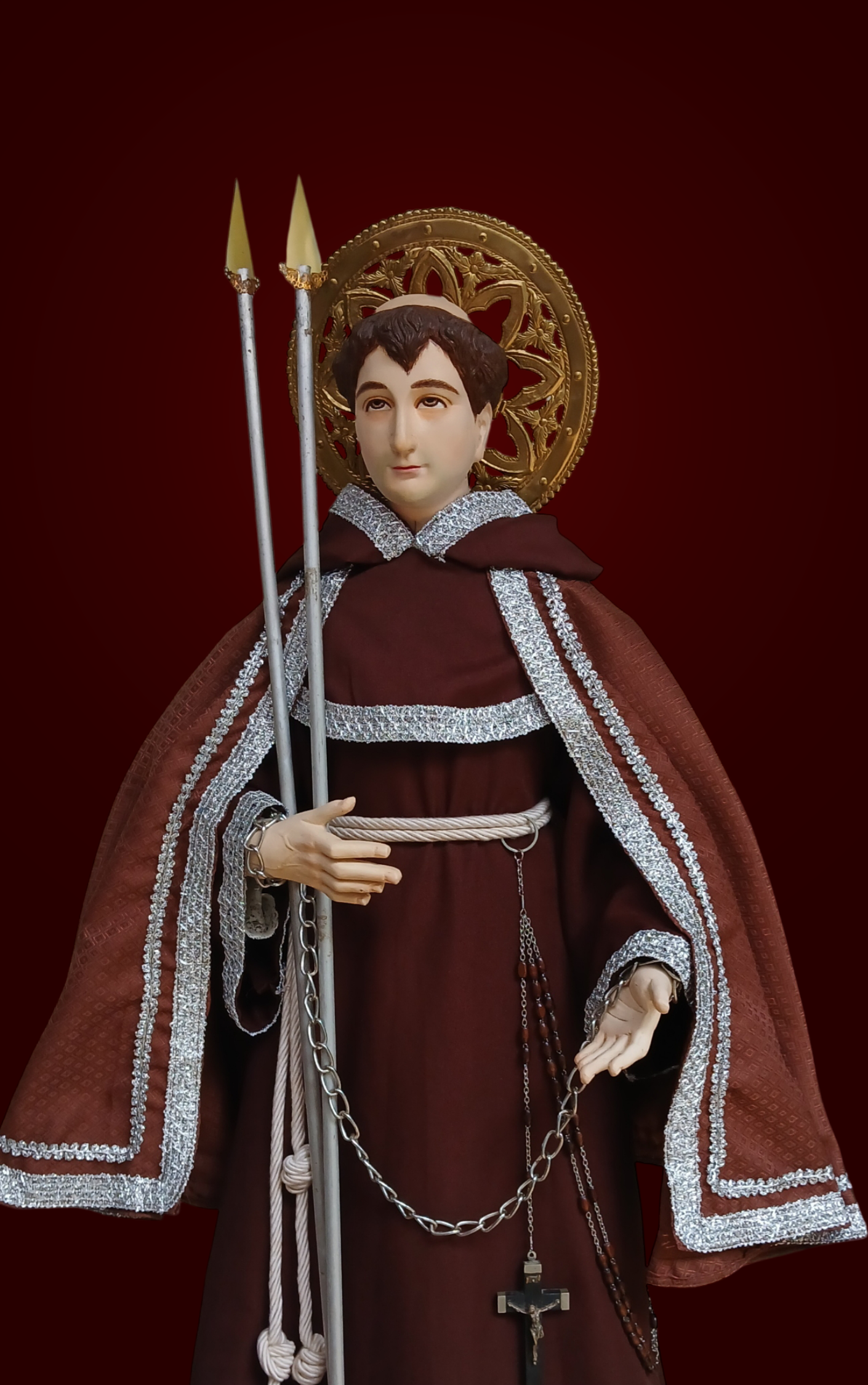
San Pedro Bautista y Blasquez

== Devotion to Nuestra Señora de Aguas Santas ==
The local image of the Virgin Mary under the title of Nuestra Señora de Aguas Santas (Our Lady of the Holy Waters). The image of Virgen de Aguas Santas was said to be miraculous. Some of the miracles includes the wetting of the Virgin’s robes up to the shoulders, amorseco growing from the hems of her garments and mysterious footprints all over the church leading to her altar.

Sometime in 1800, a fisherman who was about to alight from his boat found an image of the Blessed Virgin Mary as the Immaculate Conception on the shoreline of Laguna de Bay. Thinking that she was the one venerated on the parish, he took it and brought into the church. Upon reaching the place, he was taken aback by surprise for he saw the other image on the altar. And when he tried to lift the statue that he brought along, he discover that he could no longer carry it alone. It is now called the "Batang Birhen", "Birhen sa Genesis" and the Processional image (Callejera) of Nuestra Señora de Aguas Santas.

During the Japanese occupation, she appeared to a Japanese soldier during WWII and pleaded with him not to burn down her house (the church). She introduced herself as "Maria San." After the war, the said Japanese soldier returned and asked that he wanted to see "Maria San." It was just after the town fiesta, and the Blessed Virgin was resting in the sacristy after the procession. The Japanese man asked the church caretakers, Aling Naring and Aling Auring Baes, where his "Maria San" was, speaking in Japanese. So they called the parish priest to speak with the Japanese man. When the priest pointed to the image of the 'Batang Birhen' or the Callejera (processional image) of the Virgen of Agua Santa, the Japanese said that was not the one he was referring to. The priest then accompanied the Japanese man to the sacristy where the original image is placed and when he saw her, he prostrated himself before the miraculous image of Nuestra Señora de Aguas Santas and begged for forgiveness. It turned out that the Japanese man had learned the Filipino language and confessed to the people in the church that he was the Japanese soldier who once attempted to burn down the church during the time of war.

Due to the popular devotion to the Virgin and miracles attributed to her, the church is currently petitioning to become a diocesan shrine.

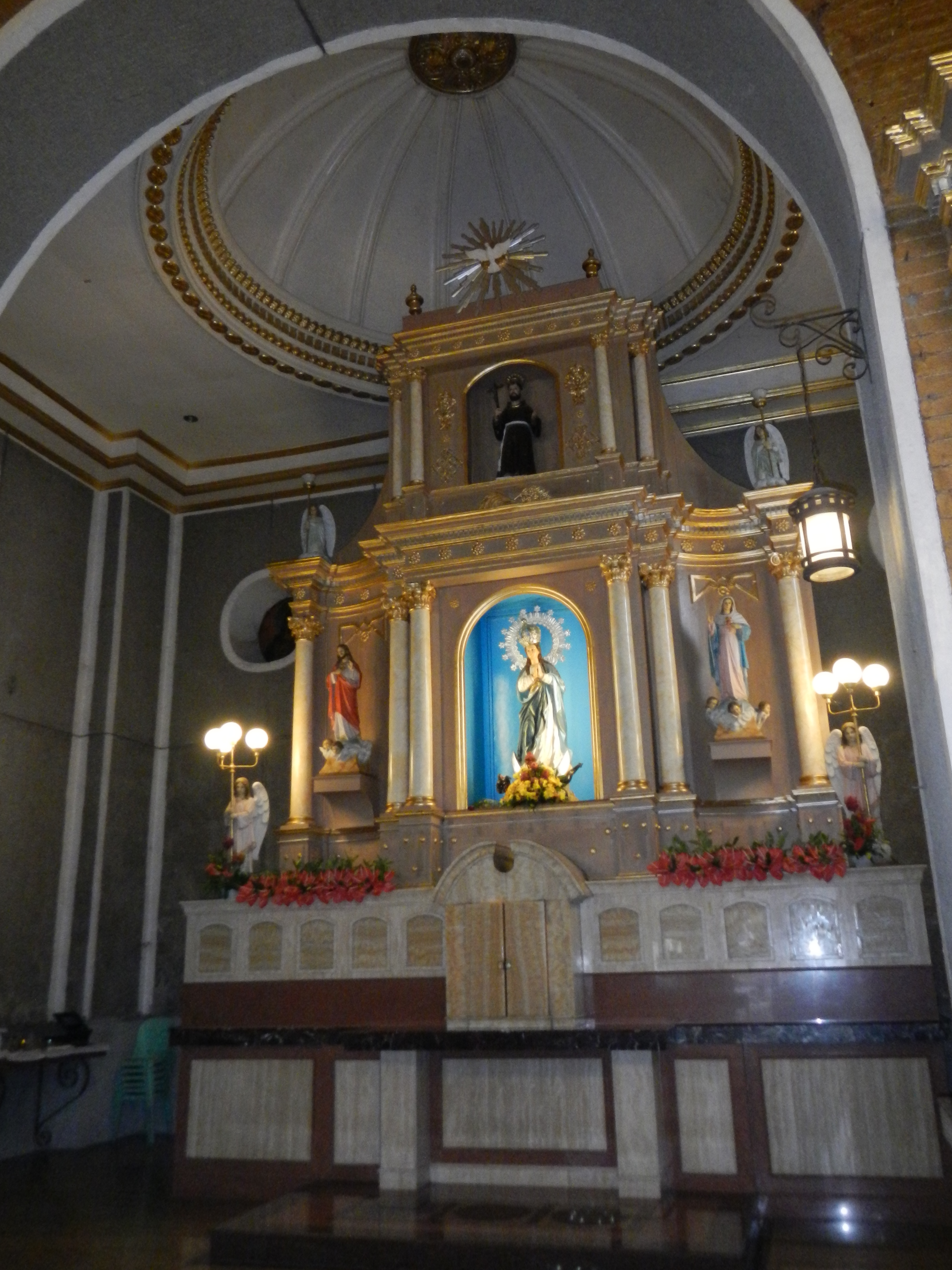
Retablo mayor with Nuestra Señora de Aguas Santas in the central niche

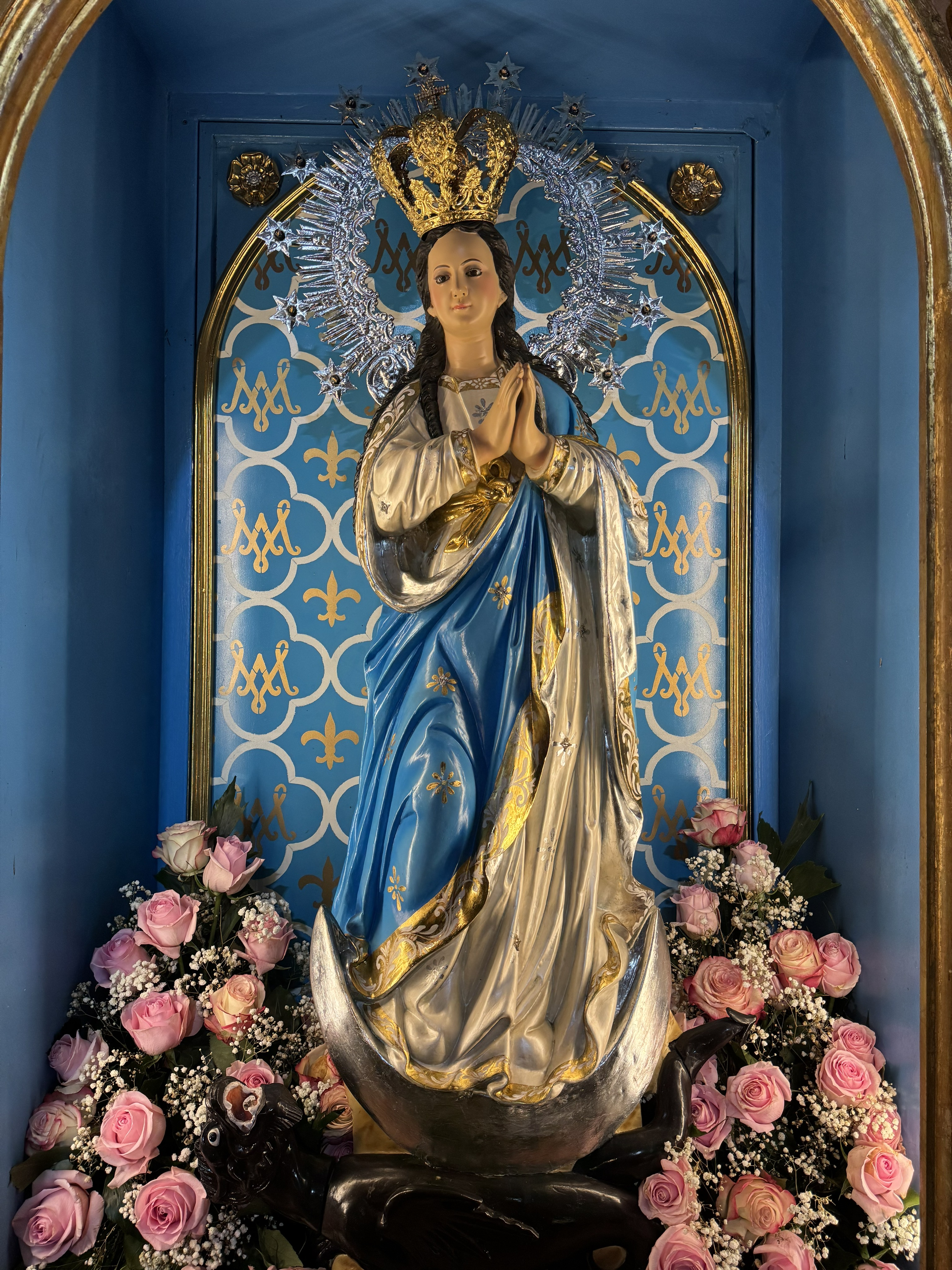
The Original Image (Matandang Birhen) of Nuestra Señora de Aguas Santas

== Bibliography ==
- Huerta, Felix de (1865). Estado geográfico, topográfico, estadístico, histórico-religioso. Binondo: Imprenta de M. Sanchez y Ca.
- Historical Markers: Regions I-IV and CAR. Manila: National Historical Institute (Philippines). 1993. p. 63. ISBN 9715380611.
