= National Arts Center =

Arts center in Laguna, Philippines

- Location within Laguna Location within Luzon Location within Philippines
- Address: Los Baños, Laguna; Philippines
- Coordinates: 14°09′47″N 121°12′57″E
- Operator: Philippine High School for the Arts; Cultural Center of the Philippines
- Capacity: 1,000

Construction
- Opened: 1976; 50 years ago

The National Arts Center is a building complex situated in Mount Makiling, Los Baños, Laguna, the Philippines. The establishment was inaugurated in 1976. Its theater is the Tanghalang Maria Makiling or the NAC Center, which has an audience capacity of 1,000 people.

The complex occupies a total area of 13.5 hectares (33 acres) at the Makiling Forest Reservation. Most of its facilities are operated by the Philippine High School for the Arts except the Pugad Adarna, which is run by the Cultural Center of the Philippines.

Venues aside from the theater include the Pugad Aliguyon or the Marvilla Cottages, the Pugad Adarna or Executive House, a two-story clubhouse called the Bulwagang Sarimanok, and St. Marc's Chapel which is also used for weddings. The chapel's monumental cross was designed by Leandro Locsin and features a negative space outline of the crucified Jesus Christ.
