= Los Baños, Laguna =

Municipality in Laguna, Philippines

Los Baños
- Municipality
- Municipality of Los Baños
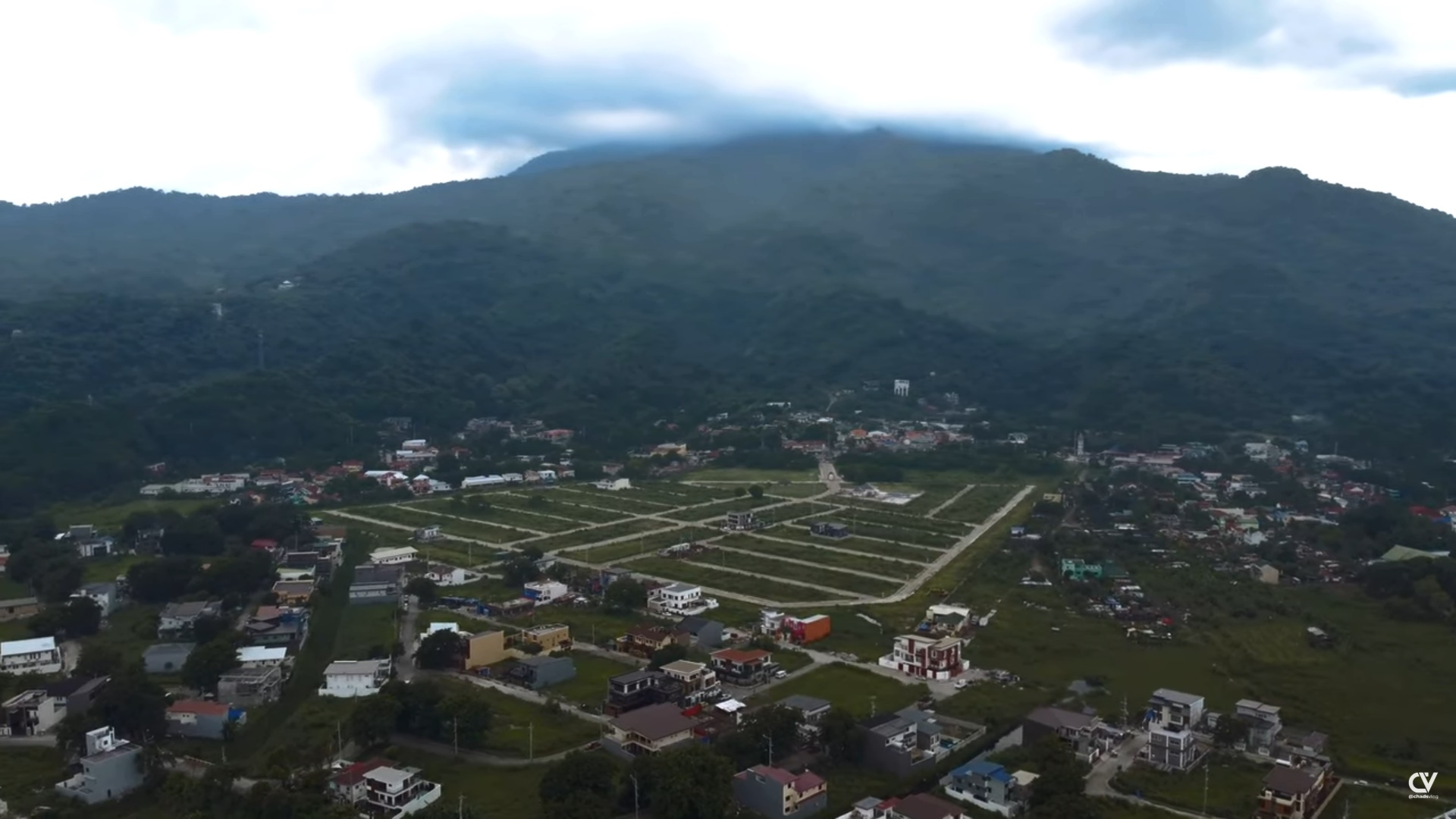
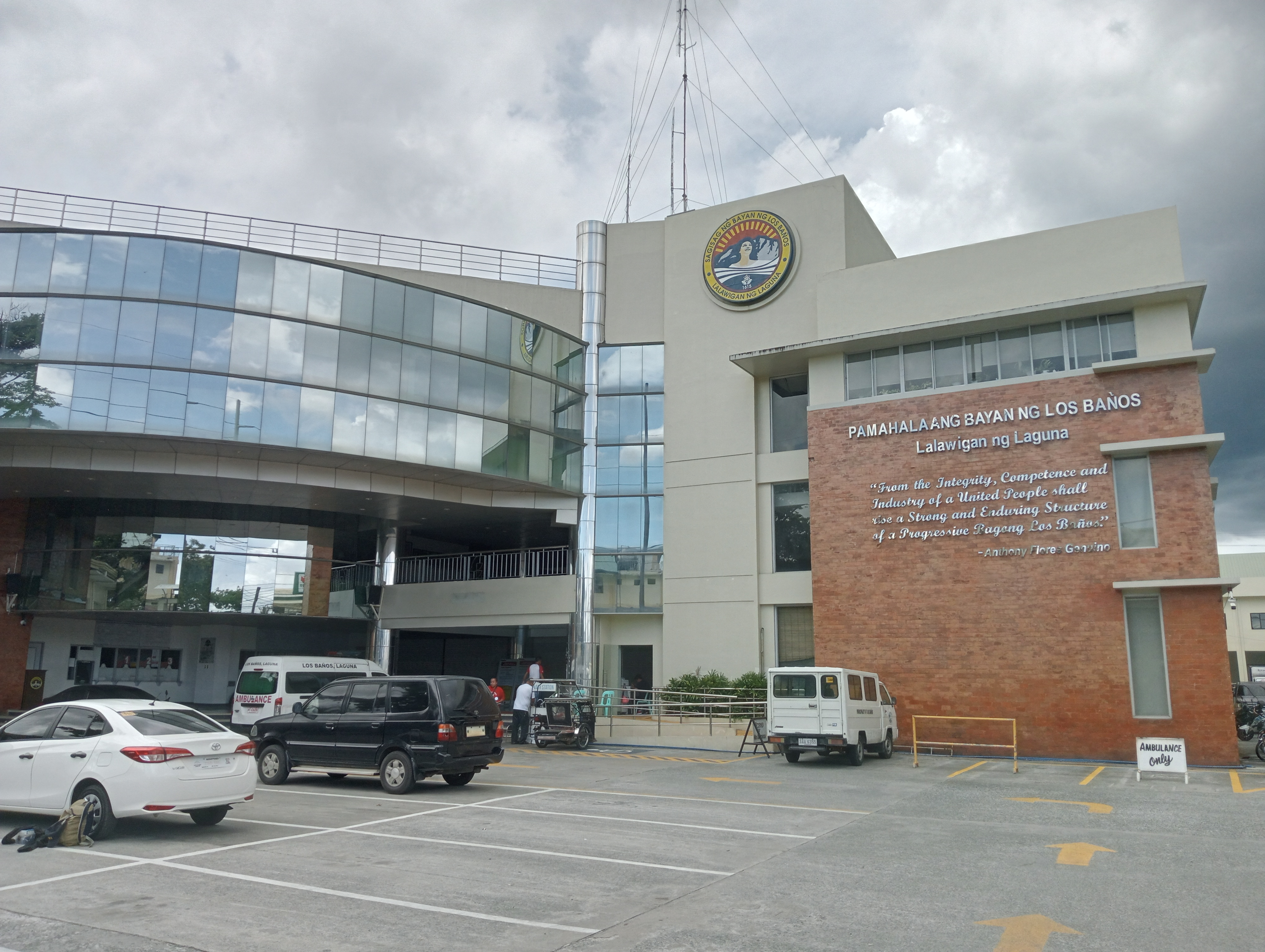
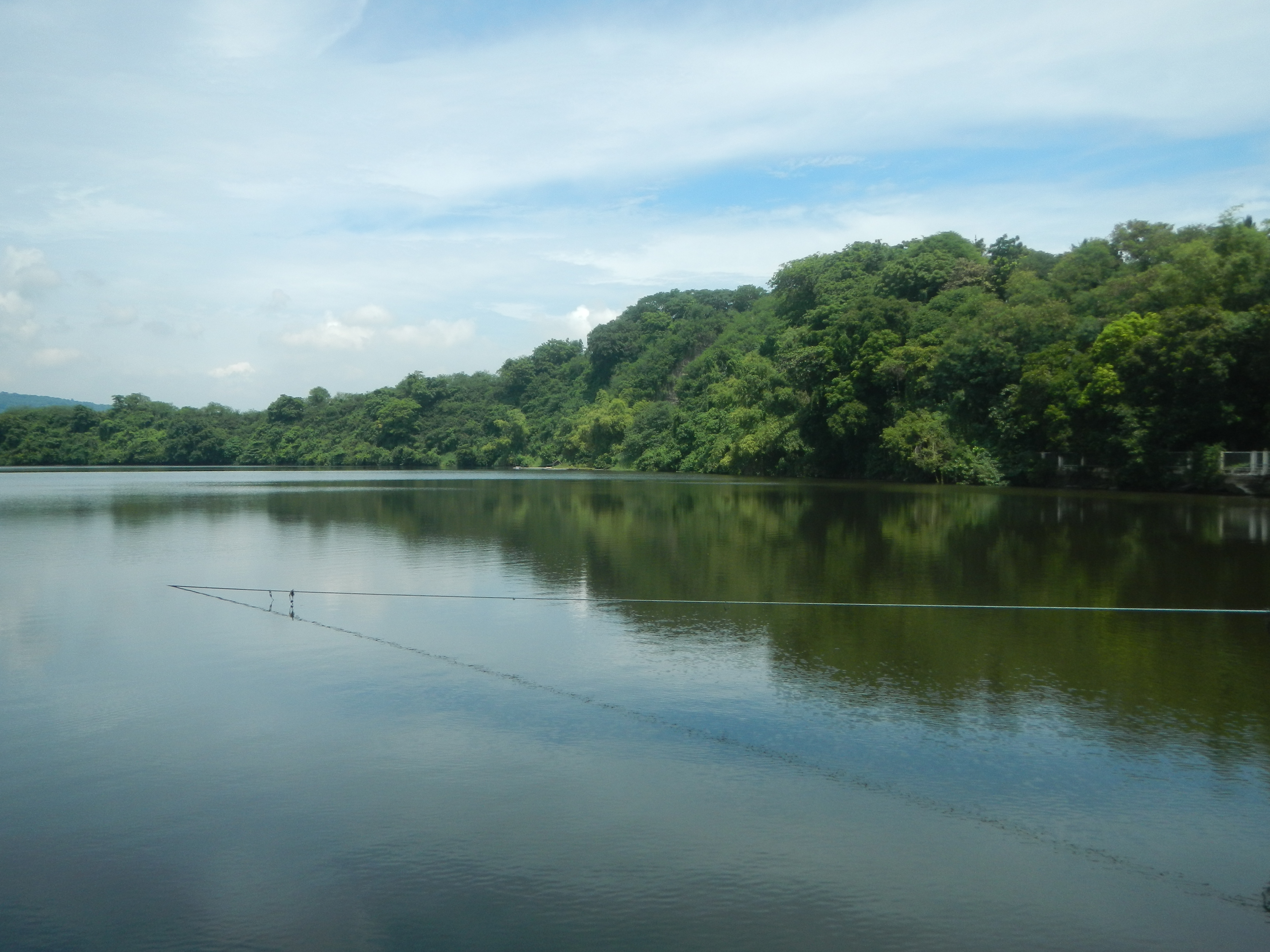
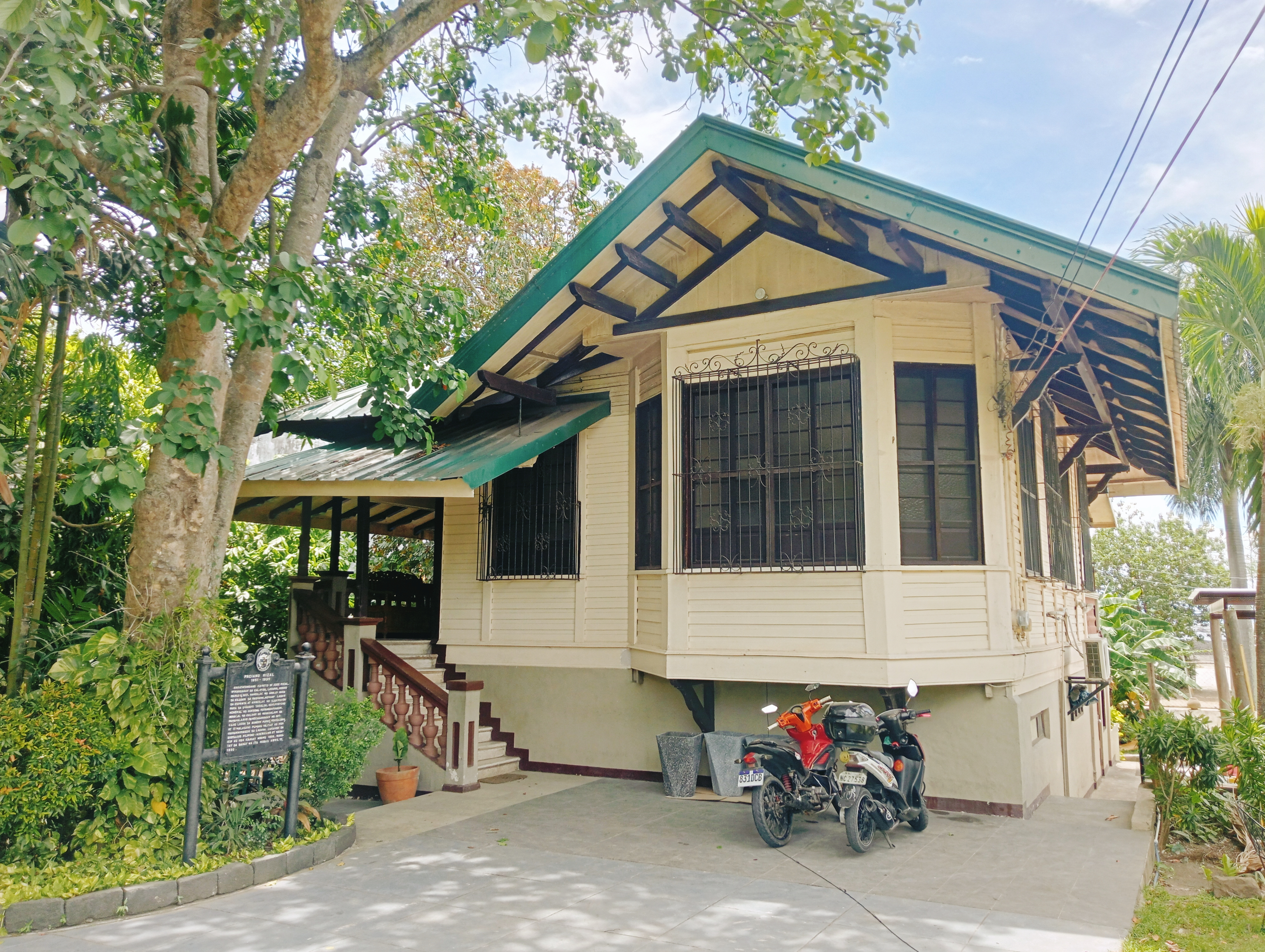
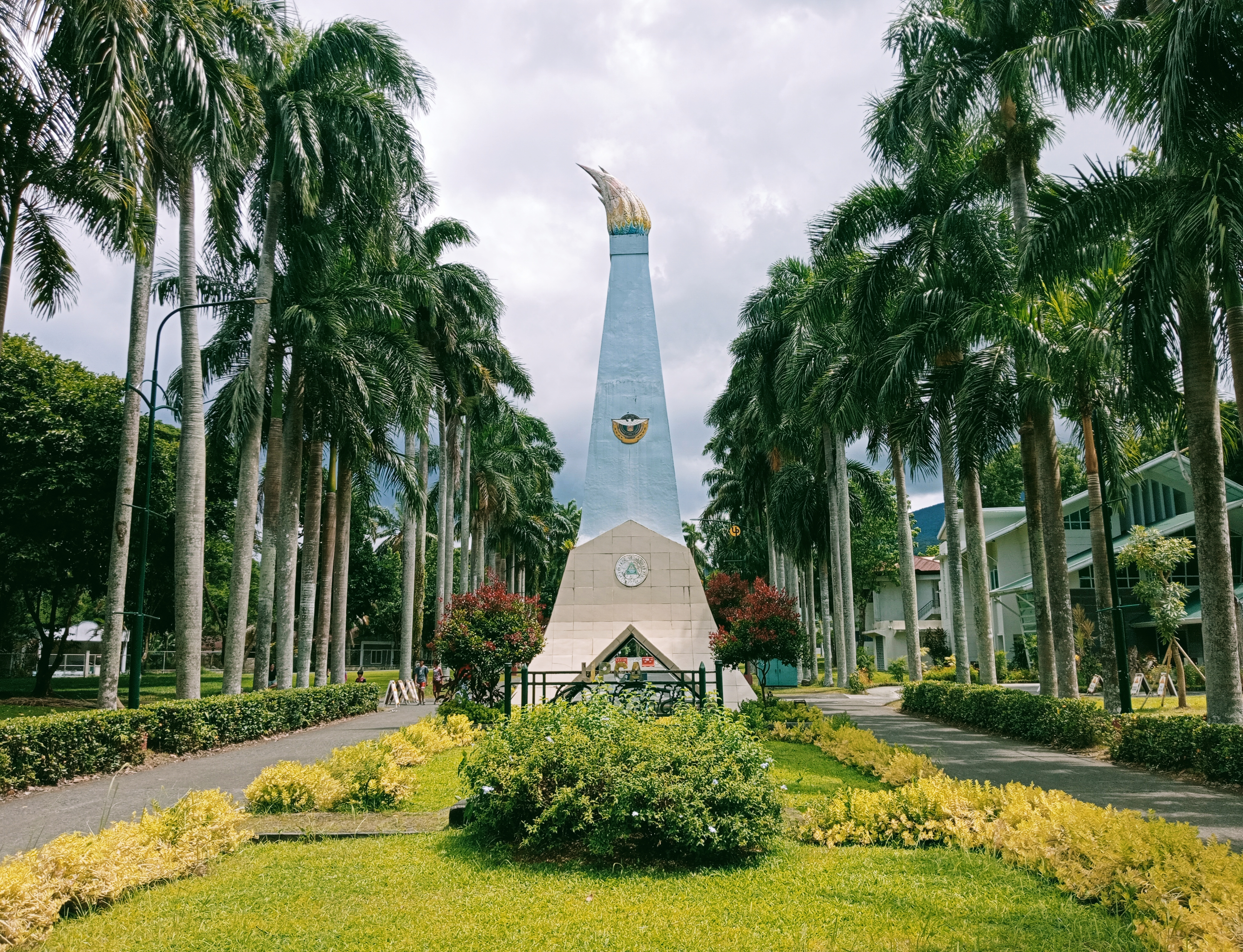
- From top, left to right: Mount Makiling, Los Baños Municipal Hall, Tadlac lake, Paciano Rizal Shrine, and UPLB Academic Heritage Monument

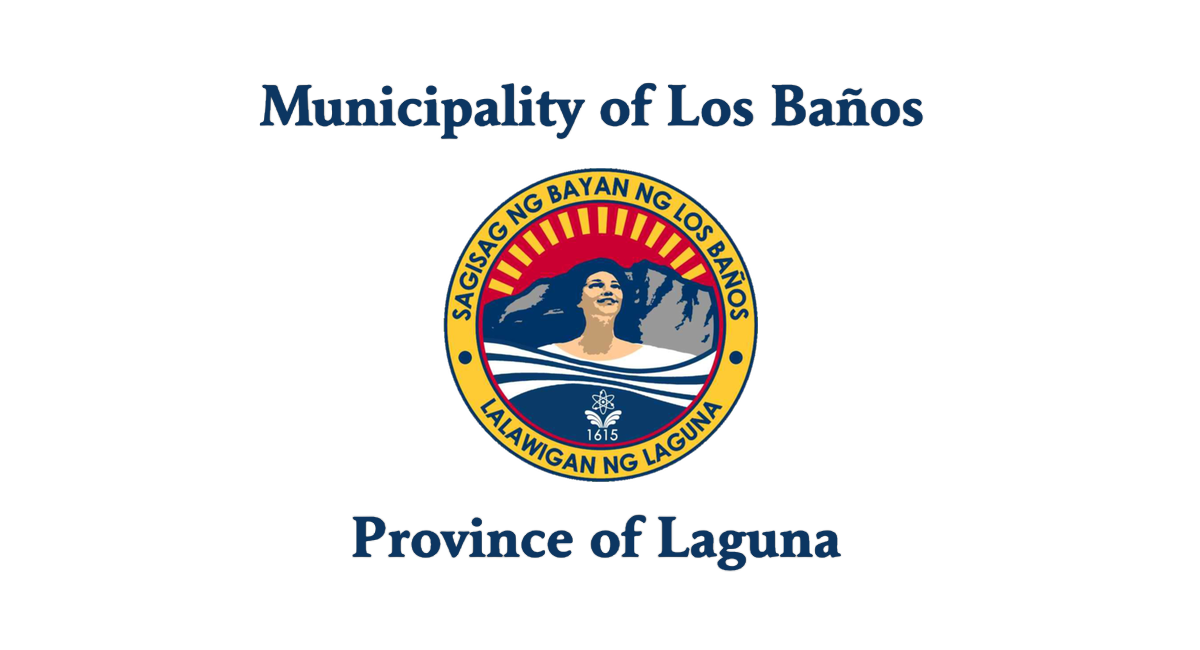
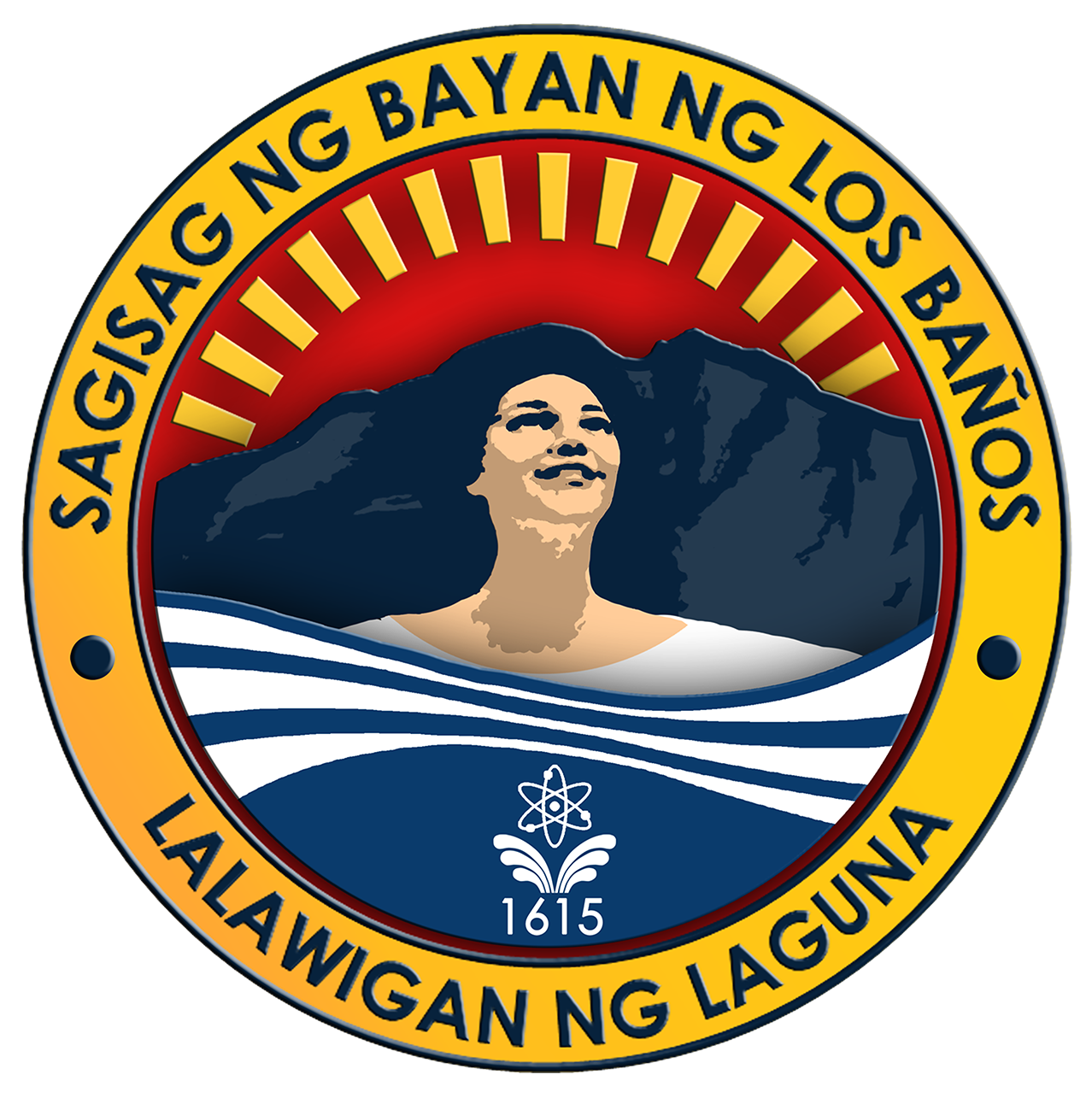
- Flag Seal
- Etymology: lit: The Baths or The Bathing Place
- Nickname: Special Science and Nature City
- Map of Laguna with Los Baños highlighted
- Interactive map of Los Baños
- Location within the Philippines
- Coordinates: 14°10′N 121°13′E
- Country: Philippines
- Region: Calabarzon
- Province: Laguna
- District: 2nd district
- Formal Establishment: 1640
- Barangays: 14 (see Barangays)

Government
  - Type: Sangguniang Bayan
  - Mayor: Neil Andrew N. Nocon
  - Vice Mayor: Marlo Pj A. Alipon Jr.
  - Representative: Ramil L. Hernandez
  - Municipal Council: Members: Miko C. Pelegrina; Aldous Amiel B. Perez; Muriel Laisa B. Dizon; Leren Mae M. Bautista; Bebedicto S. Alborida; Rand Edouard R. De Jesus; Myla E. Alinsunurin; Jay G. Rolusta
  - Electorate: 73,968 voters (2025)

Area
  - Total: 54.22 km^{2} (20.93 sq mi)
- Elevation: 118 m (387 ft)
- Highest elevation: 1,095 m (3,593 ft)
- Lowest elevation: 2 m (6.6 ft)

Population (2024 census)
  - Total: 117,030
  - Density: 2,158/km^{2} (5,590/sq mi)
  - Households: 32,017
- Demonym: Los Bañense

Economy
  - Income class: 1st municipal income class
  - Poverty incidence: 6.19% (2023)
  - Revenue: ₱ 476.8 million (2024)
  - Assets: ₱ 1,546 million (2024)
  - Expenditure: ₱ 471.3 million (2024)
  - Liabilities: ₱ 535.7 million (2024)

Service provider
  - Electricity: Manila Electric Company (Meralco)
- Time zone: UTC+8 (PST)
- ZIP code: 4030, 4031
- PSGC: 0403411000
- IDD : area code: +63 (0)49
- Native languages: Tagalog
- Website: losbanos.gov.ph

Los Baños (IPA: [lɔs bɐˈɲɔs]), officially the Municipality of Los Baños (Tagalog: Bayan ng Los Baños), colloquially 'Elbi' or simply LB, is a municipality in the province of Laguna, Philippines. According to the 2024 census, it has a population of 117,030 people.

It was declared as the Special Science and Nature City of the Philippines through Presidential Proclamation No. 349. The proclamation, however, does not convert the municipality to a city or give it corporate powers that are accorded to other cities due to Los Baños being a suburb of neighboring Calamba.

== Etymology ==
Los Baños is derived from Spanish for "the baths", also referring to the hot springs. It was named as such in 1589 when Fr. Pedro Bautista built public baths in the present-day town.

== History ==
=== Spanish colonial era ===
Los Baños started as a settlement, a barrio of Bay called Mainit, the Tagalog term for "hot", alluding to the thermal springs at the foot of Mount Makiling. By 1589, through a Franciscan friar, it became popularly called by its present name, Los Baños.

In 1595, a temporary building made of bamboo and cogon was built to serve as shelter for the patients who journeyed to Mainit to seek cures for their ailments. It was on September 17, 1615, when the friars administered Los Baños as a separate town from Bay.

In 1671, more permanent structures like churches and hospitals were built only to be destroyed by a fire in 1727. The structures were re-erected at a slow rate. The church which now stands in the municipal center of Los Baños dates back to 1851. The Spanish Governor's palace was built in 1879 but was only completed in 1892.

=== American invasion era ===
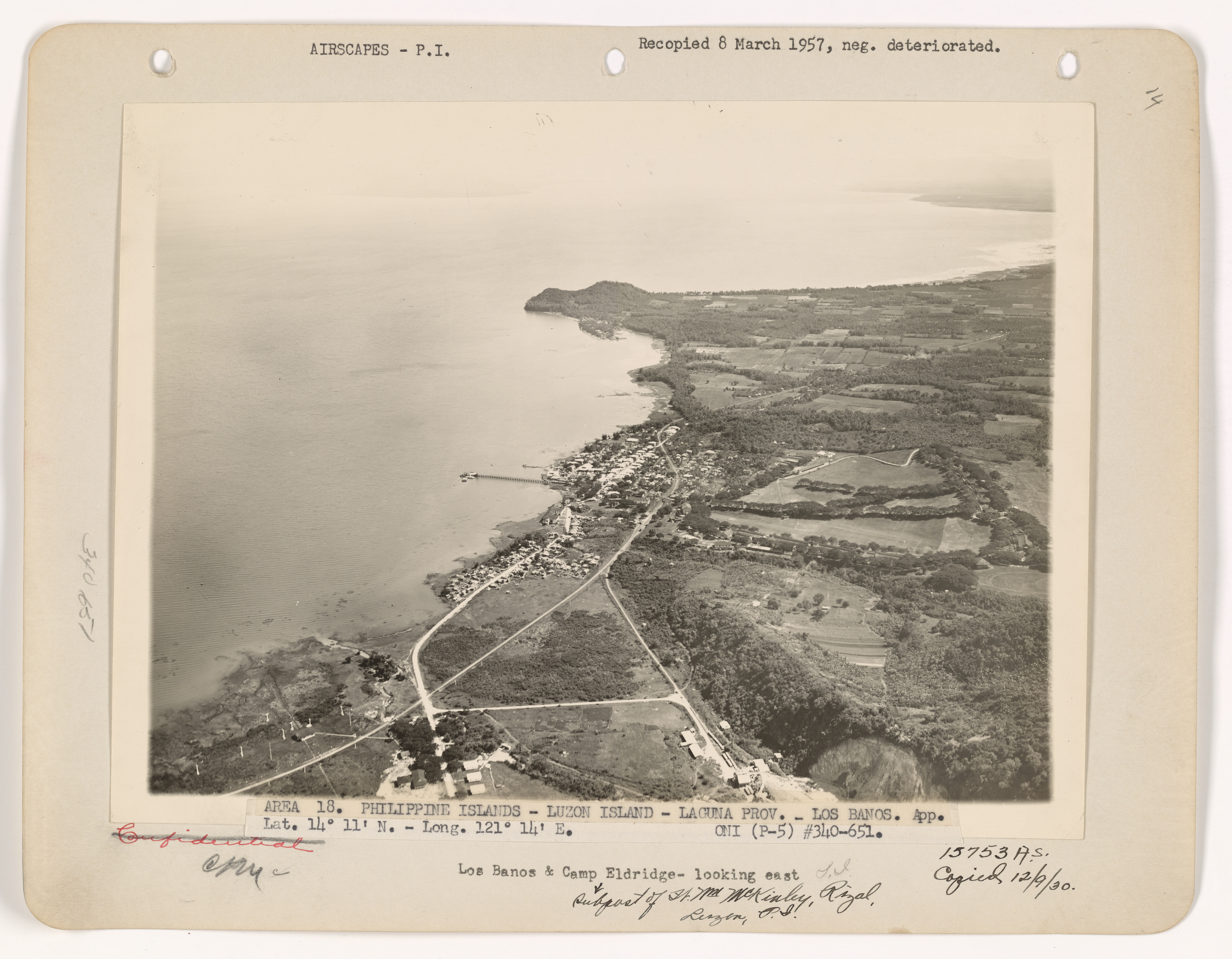
Aerial view of Los Baños, circa 1930s

In 1909, the University of the Philippines College of Agriculture (UPCA) was established.

The UPCA became a Japanese prisoner of war camp for nationals of the Allied countries, a target of Kempetai punitive measures, and the headquarters of a secret organization of guerrillas. On February 23, 1945, US forces of the First Battalion, 511th Parachute Infantry Regiment of the Eleventh Airborne Division led a combined amphibious and airborne raid against the prison camp, rescuing over 2,000 Allied nationals. They killed the 250-man Japanese garrison. In order to force the prisoners to leave behind their belongings and speed up the evacuation before the Japanese could send reinforcements, US forces and Filipino guerrillas burned the camp. Only Baker Hall, the university gymnasium until 2010, remained intact. General Yamashita, the most famous World War 2 General of the Japanese, was tried and executed for war crimes in Los Baños, Laguna.

=== Philippine independence ===
In 1959, the 10th World Scout Jamboree was held in Los Baños, with the theme "Building Tomorrow Today" with an attendance of 12,203 Scouts.

The International Rice Research Institute (IRRI) was established in 1960 during the administration of President Carlos P. Garcia, and soon after President Diosdado Macapagal had started his term, IRRI had begun work on the development of the new “Miracle Rice” (IR8) variety, which would later increase Philippine rice production significantly.

==== Martial law era (1965-1986) ====
The social unrest which arose when Ferdinand Marcos' debt-driven campaign spending led to the 1969 Philippine balance of payments crisis spread beyond the capital and also triggered protests by students in UP Los Baños, most prominently in the form of a 13-day strike which saw barricades established at the UPLB Gate and Los Baños Highway Junction areas. This unrest coincided with another issue, which was the call for the UP College of Agriculture to become independent from the University of the Philippines in Diliman.

When martial law was declared in September 1972, Marcos cracked down on any form of criticism or activism, leading to the arrest of many of Los Baños residents. Among those who experienced arrest and torture during martial law were the UPLB Institute of Chemistry's Dr. Aloysius Baes, while among those who became desaparecidos were Tish Ladlad, Cristina Catalla, Gerardo "Gerry" Faustino, Rizalina Ilagan, UPLB Professor Jessica Sales, and PCARRD artist-illustrator Manny Ontong. Among those confirmed to have been martyred for their beliefs was Manuel Bautista, the student leader who had spearheaded the establishment of UPLB's Textbook Exchange and Rental Center (TERC).

In 1979, the evolution and development of academic excellence in Los Baños moved the people of Los Baños to request president Marcos to declare the municipality as "A Special University Zone", granted on June 15, 1982, by virtue of letter of instruction No. 883.

Los Baños was further declared as an "Agriculture, Forestry, and Life Sciences Community" on March 17, 1982, by virtue of Executive Order No. 784 (Section 23).

==== Post-EDSA revolution era ====
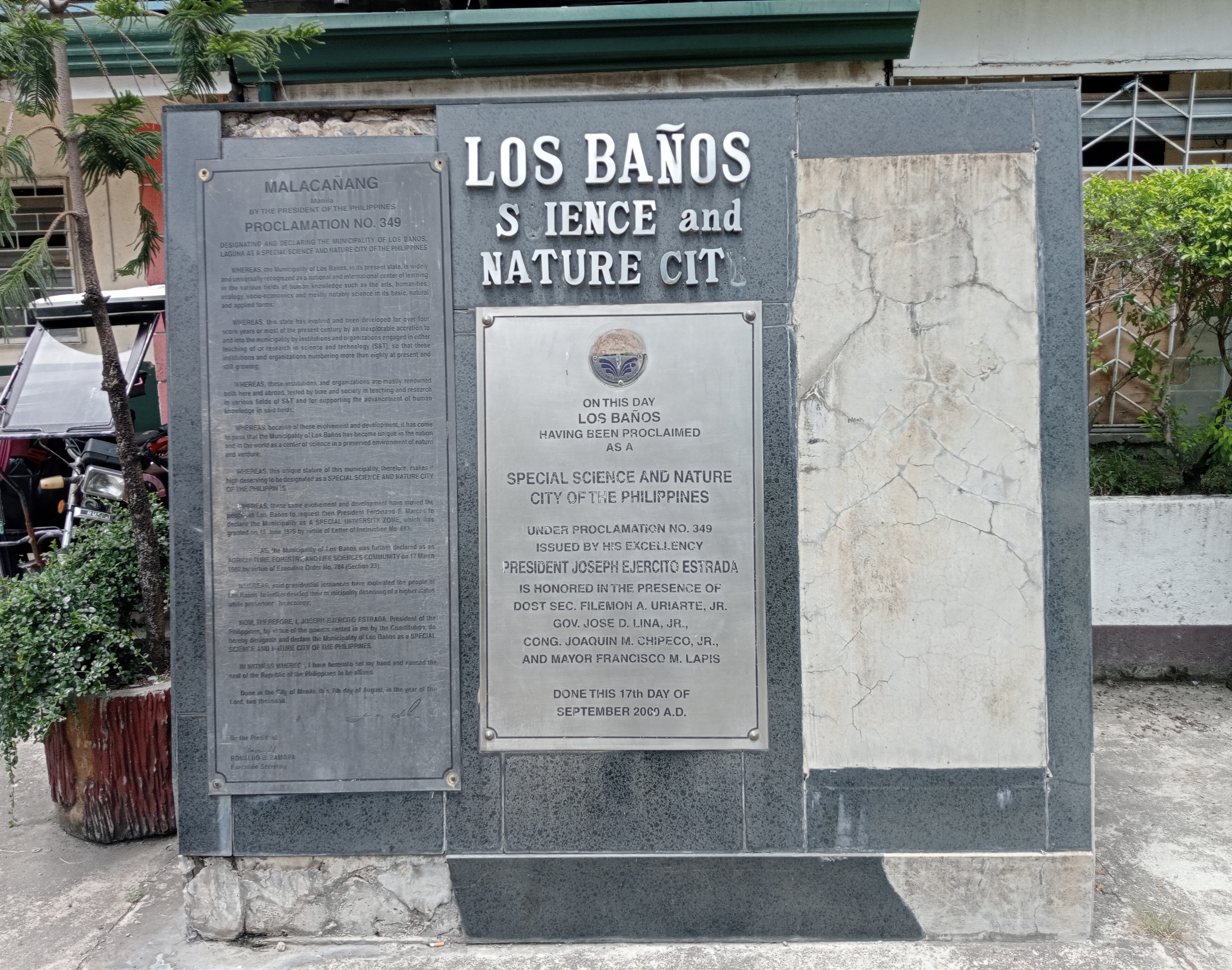
Special Science and Nature City Marker

On August 7, 2000, Los Baños was declared a Special Science and Nature City of the Philippines by virtue of Presidential Proclamation No. 349. It was signed by then-President Joseph Estrada. The Proclamation is in recognition of the town's important contribution in country. The municipality has remained as the country's hub of science and nature with the presence of national and international research institutions collaborating towards the advancement of science research.

=== 21st century ===
The 6th Flora Malesiana, a triennial gathering of people with botanical expertise regarding "Malesia", was held from September 20 to 24, 2004. It provided a forum for Flora Malesiana members and encouraged publications on Malesian plants.

During the 2005 Southeast Asian Games, Los Baños played host to the aquatics events, with the newly built Trace Aquatic Center at Trace College serving as the venue.

The headquarters of the Association of Southeast Asian Nations (ASEAN) Center for Biodiversity was opened on August 8, 2006. It leased office spaces until late 2010s from the DENR-Ecosystems Research and Development Bureau (ERDB), located at the College of Forestry, University of the Philippines Los Baños (UPLB) until it moved to its newly built own buildings at a parcel of land near the University Health Service (UHS/'Infirmary') towards the late 2010s/early 2020s, which coincided with a foundation anniversary celebrations of the organization. The Philippines assumed the Chairmanship of ASEAN in 2006 and played host to the 12th ASEAN and East Asia Summits (held in Metro Cebu, January 2007).

In January 2007, the 5th ASEAN Inter-Club Age-Group Swimming Championships was held in the Trace Aqua Sports Center.

Los Baños also plays host to the UAAP, as the Trace Aquatics Center has served as the venue for the league's swimming competitions since UAAP Season 70 until UAAP Season 76.

Currently, Los Baños is probably the densest habitat of academicians in South East Asia. Although it is a small town, it has contributed widely through scientific achievements and contributions locally and worldwide particularly on agriculture.

On December 3, 2020, firing from outside the perimeter walls, its incumbent mayor Caesar P. Perez was assassinated inside the municipal office premises by an armed assailant, with a former opposition councilor suspected to be the mastermind.

== Geography ==
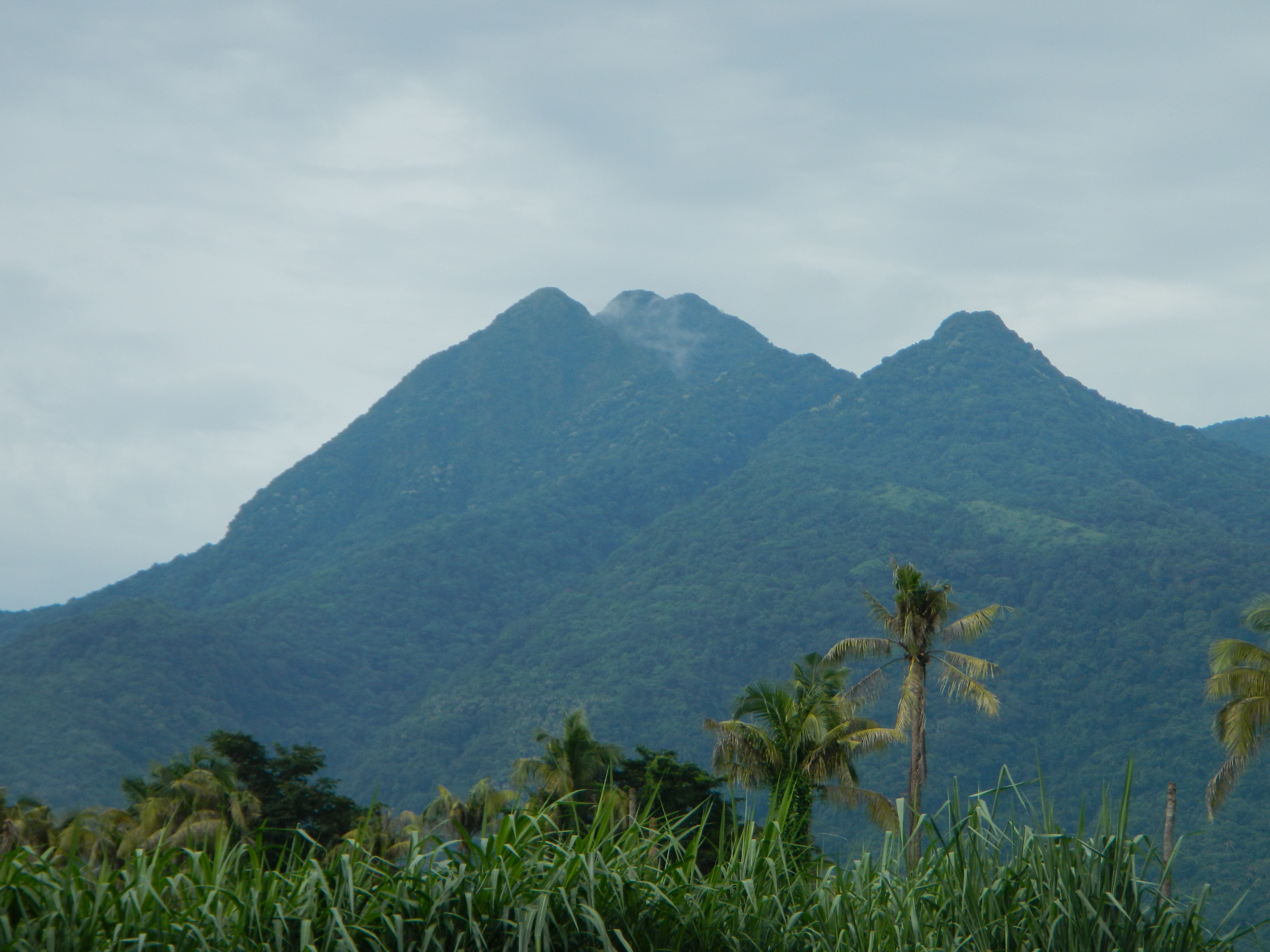
Mount Makiling, previously declared as the first national park of the Philippines is now administered by the University of the Philippines Los Baños

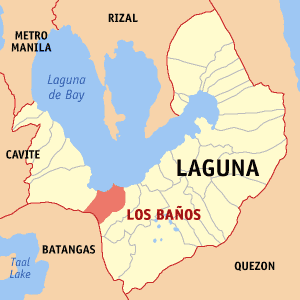
PNG version of Los Baños map in 2004

Los Baños is nestled between two of Southern Luzon's most dominant geographical features – Mount Makiling to the south and south-west and Laguna de Bay to the north. In fact, Laguna de Bay's southernmost tip is at Barangay Bambang, and Barangay Bagong Silang is already halfway up Mount Makiling. Both the mountain and the lake are volcanic features – Makiling being a potentially active volcano whose geothermal activities gave birth to the hot springs after which the town was named, and Laguna de Bay being the filled-in caldera of a massive prehistoric volcano.

Another notable geological feature is Tadlac Lake, a maar lake whose almost perfectly round shape and uncharted waters have led some locals to call it "the enchanted lake". Others call it "alligator lake", a reminder that it served as the last bastion of Laguna de Bay's once-plentiful crocodile population, which has since been wiped out and is now just another legendary part of Philippine history.

It has a total land area of 56.5 square kilometers (21.8 sq mi) and is bordered on the south and south-west by Mount Makiling and Santo Tomas in Batangas, on the north by Laguna de Bay, on the north-west by Calamba and on the east by the town of Bay. The town is located 63 kilometers (39 mi) southeast of Manila and is easily accessible via the South Luzon Expressway along with Manila South Road and Calamba–Pagsanjan Road.

The municipality lies on the northern slopes of the long dormant volcano Mount Makiling and is known among tourists for its hot spring resorts.

=== Rivers ===
The town of Los Baños is crossed by five rivers or creeks:

- The Dampalit river, which is named after an edible herb, dampalit (Sesuvium portulacastrum), which often grows near river shores, originates on the north face of Mt. Makiling east of the Philippine High School for the Arts, and feeds into Laguna lake at the boundary of Barangays Lalakay and Bambang.
- The Saran creek, whose headwaters begin somewhere near the municipal dumpsite, flows through Barangay Anos near the municipal cemetery, and feeds into the lake at Barangay Malinta.
- The Pele creek, named after the pili tree (Canarium ovatum), flows through the west side of Barangay Batong Malake and has its mouth at the boundary of Barangays Malinta and Mayondon.
- The Molawin River, most familiar to UPLB students because it flows through the UPLB campus and the Makiling Botanic Gardens, is named after the Molave tree (Vitex parviflora).
- The Maitim river, whose name means "black", flows through the easternmost portions of Los Baños, marking the town's boundary with its neighboring town of Bay. The Molawin and Maitim rivers merge just a few meters before feeding into Laguna de Bay at the shore of Barangay Maahas.

=== Climate ===
Los Baños has a tropical monsoon climate (Köppen climate classification Am).

Climate data for Los Baños, Laguna
Month	Jan	Feb	Mar	Apr	May	Jun	Jul	Aug	Sep	Oct	Nov	Dec	Year
Mean daily maximum °C (°F)	26.8 (80.2)	27.7 (81.9)	29.3 (84.7)	31.3 (88.3)	31.2 (88.2)	29.9 (85.8)	28.9 (84.0)	28.8 (83.8)	28.8 (83.8)	28.7 (83.7)	28.2 (82.8)	27.2 (81.0)	28.9 (84.0)
Daily mean °C (°F)	24.1 (75.4)	24.5 (76.1)	25.6 (78.1)	27.2 (81.0)	27.5 (81.5)	26.7 (80.1)	26.0 (78.8)	25.9 (78.6)	25.8 (78.4)	25.8 (78.4)	25.5 (77.9)	24.7 (76.5)	25.8 (78.4)
Mean daily minimum °C (°F)	22.3 (72.1)	22.3 (72.1)	23.1 (73.6)	24.3 (75.7)	24.9 (76.8)	24.5 (76.1)	24.1 (75.4)	24.1 (75.4)	23.9 (75.0)	23.8 (74.8)	23.7 (74.7)	23.2 (73.8)	23.7 (74.6)
Average precipitation mm (inches)	49 (1.9)	34 (1.3)	40 (1.6)	45 (1.8)	181 (7.1)	259 (10.2)	386 (15.2)	312 (12.3)	332 (13.1)	193 (7.6)	108 (4.3)	143 (5.6)	2,082 (82)
Average rainy days	5	4	5	6	15	19	21	21	20	16	10	10	152
Average relative humidity (%)	80	79	77	75	79	85	87	88	88	86	84	83	83
Source: Climate-data.org

=== Barangays ===
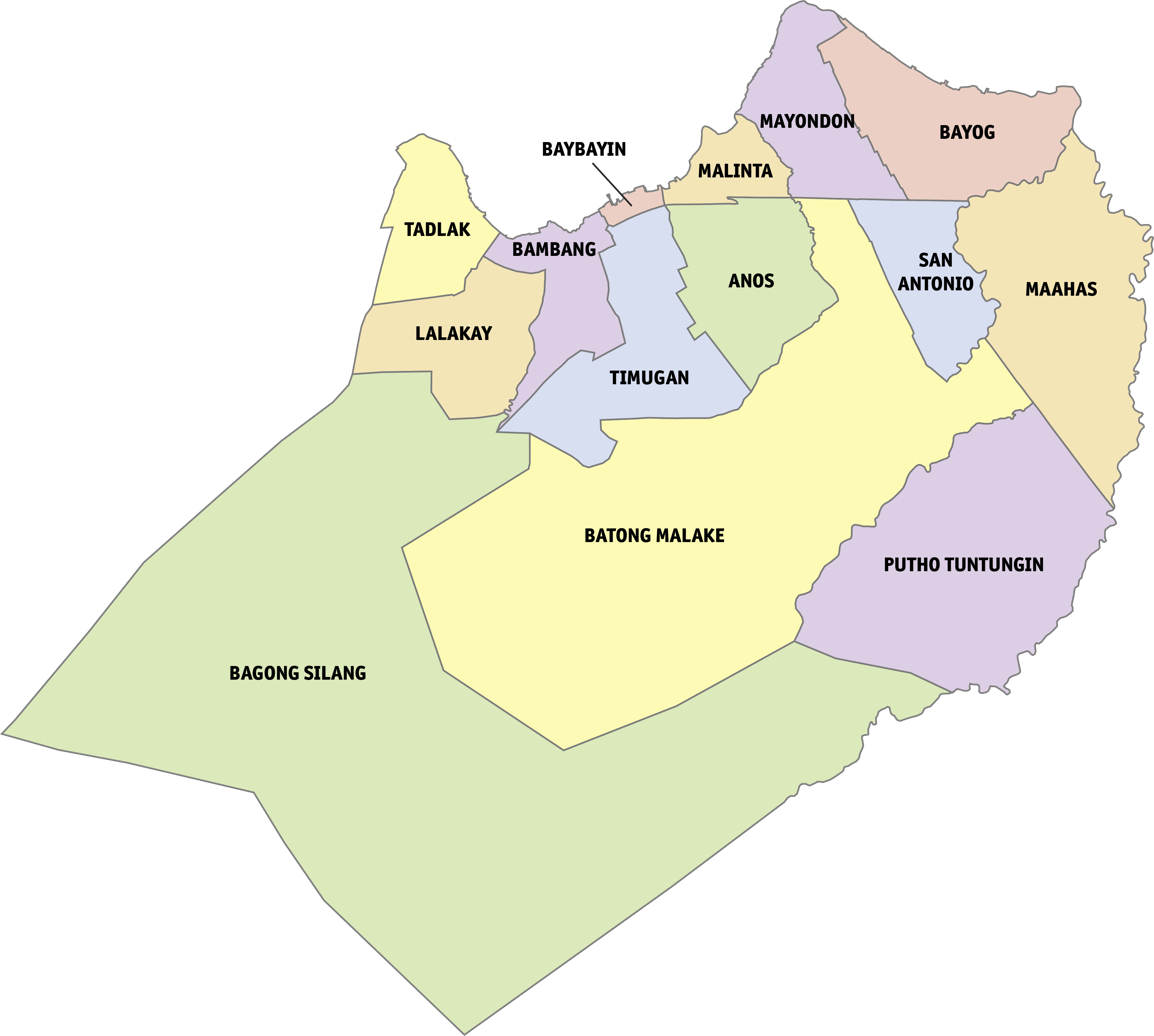
Political map of Los Baños

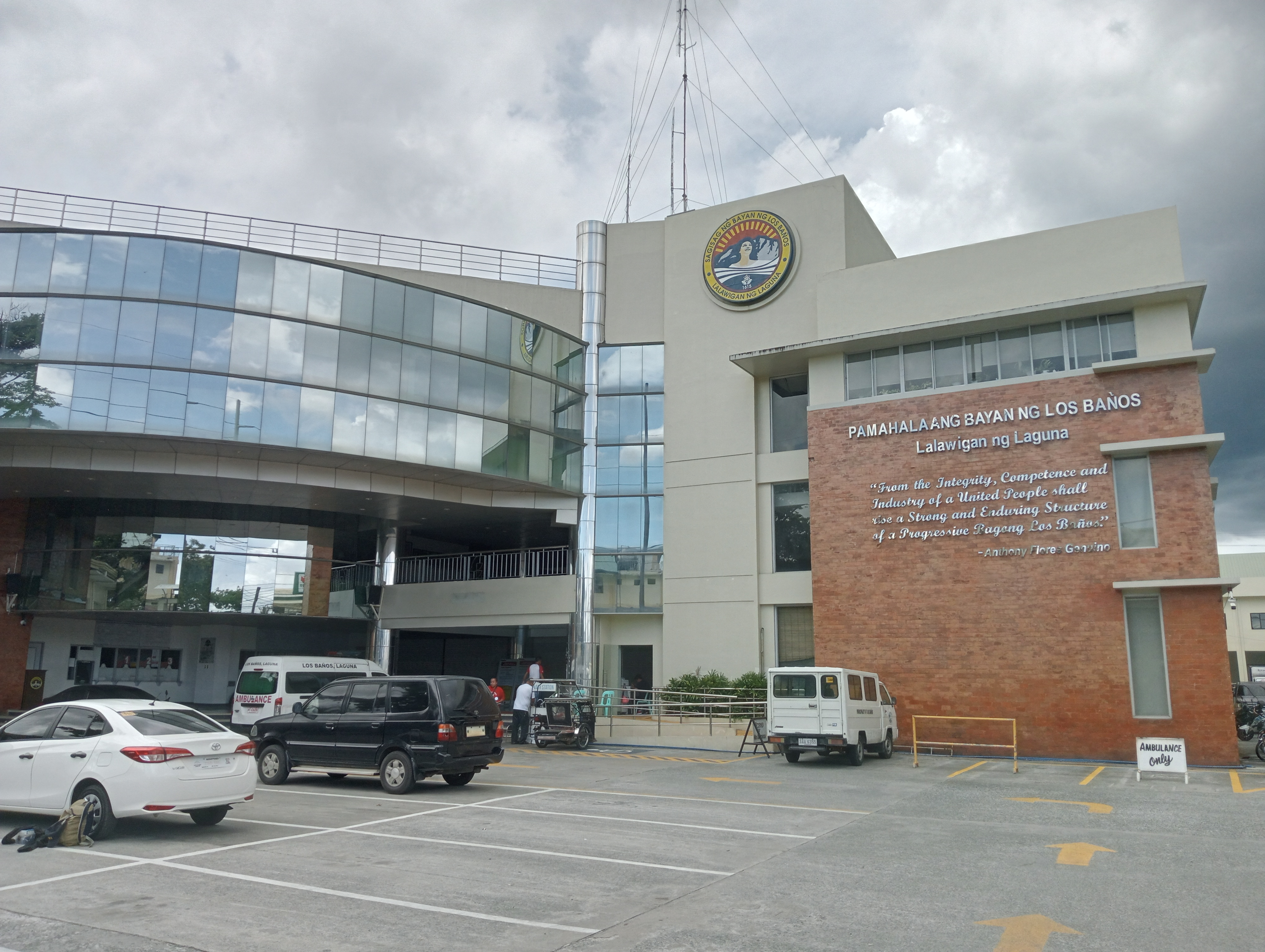
Los Baños Town Hall

Los Baños is politically subdivided into 14 barangays, as indicated below and in the image herein. Each barangay consists of puroks and some have sitios.

- Anos
- Bagong Silang
- Bambang
- Batong Malake
- Baybayin
- Bayog
- Lalakay
- Maahas
- Malinta
- Mayondon
- Putho-Tuntungin
- San Antonio
- Tadlac
- Timugan

== Demographics ==
Population census of Los Baños
Year	Pop.	±% p.a.
1903	3,352	—
1918	6,337	+4.34%
1939	9,612	+2.00%
1948	10,954	+1.46%
1960	21,519	+5.79%
1970	32,167	+4.10%
1975	38,351	+3.59%
1980	49,555	+5.26%
1990	66,211	+2.94%
1995	71,683	+1.50%
2000	82,027	+2.93%
2007	98,631	+2.58%
2010	101,884	+1.19%
2015	112,008	+1.82%
2020	115,353	+0.62%
2024	117,030	+0.35%
Source: Philippine Statistics Authority

In the 2024 census, the population of Los Baños was 117,030 people, with a density of 2,200 inhabitants per square kilometer or 5,700 inhabitants per square mile.

== Government ==
=== Local government ===
Like other LGUs in the Philippines (perhaps with the exception of the BARMM), the town holds election every three years, which will cover from Mayor, Vice Mayor, and up to the councilors.

Los Baños Municipal officials (2025–2028)
Name	Party
House of Representatives
Ramil Hernandez	Lakas
Mayor
Neil Andrew N. Nocon	Lakas
Vice Mayor
Marlo PJ A. Alipon	Independent
Councilors
Miko C. Pelegrina	Independent
Aldous Amiel B. Perez	Independent
Muriel Laisa B. Dizon	Bigkis
Leren Mae M. Bautista	Bigkis
Benedicto S. Alborida	Independent
Rand Eduoard R. de Jesus	Bigkis
Jay G. Rolusta	Independent
Ex Officio City Council Members
ABC President	Ferdinand P. Vargas (Maahas)
SK President	Samantha Nicole A. Banasihan-Ortega (Anos)

== Economy ==
Poverty incidence of Los Baños (%)

Source: Philippine Statistics Authority

== Tourism ==
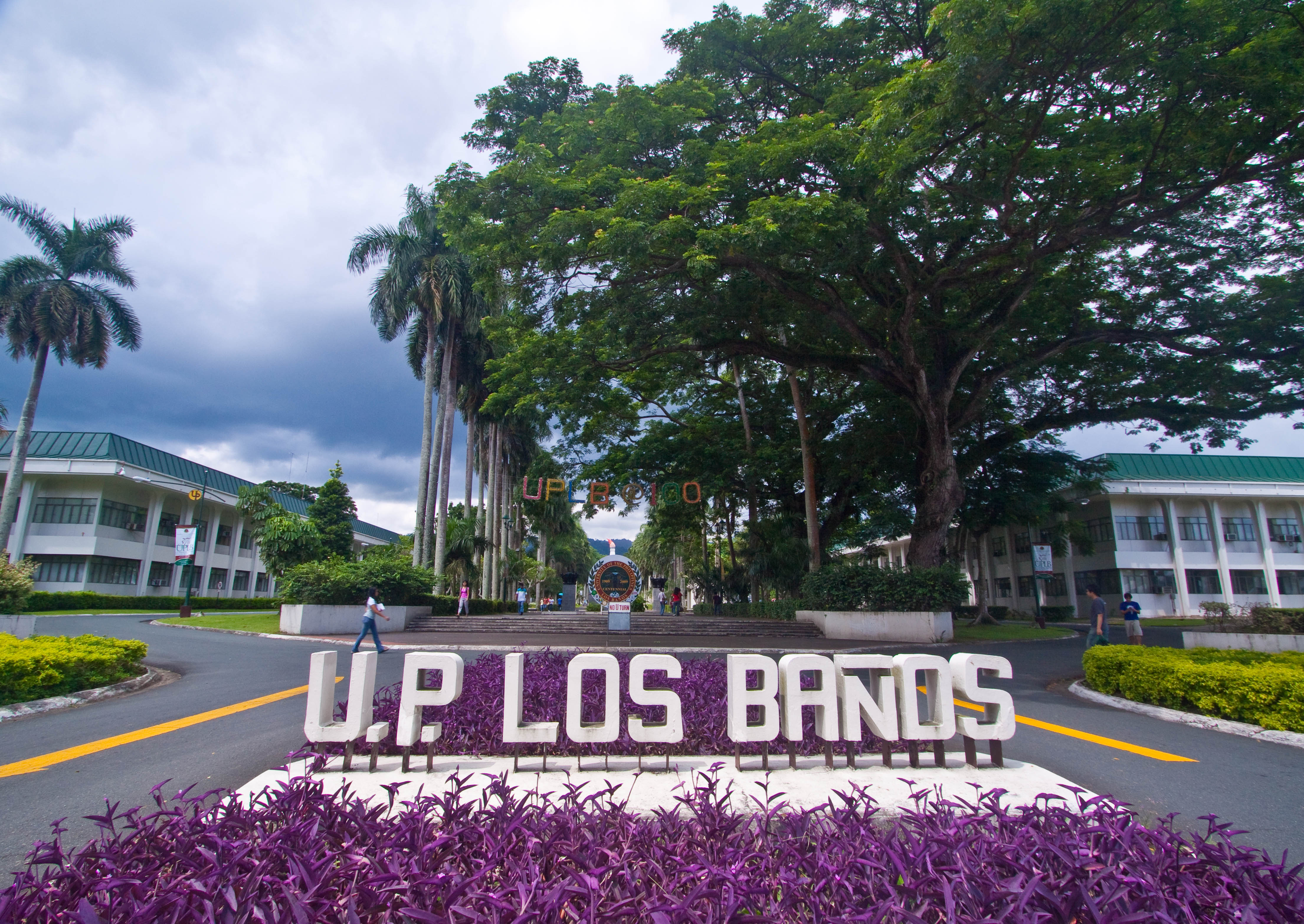
Old vestibule of University of the Philippines Los Baños

Los Baños's hot spring resorts (along with those in the preceding city of Calamba starting at Barangay Pansol) are frequent weekend or summer getaways for residents of the vast metropolis and tourists from primarily the National Capital Region (Metro Manila area) due to the town's proximity to Metro Manila and other places in the Philippines, and abroad. The town is also home to several native delicacies stores like the town's famous buko pie (coconut meat pie) as well as a home-grown brand of chocolate cake. It was also Laguna's richest municipality in terms of assets amounting to ₱652.95 million in 2017.

- University of the Philippines Los Baños and other places of interest within its administered area
  - Mount Makiling
    - Makiling Botanic Gardens
    - ASEAN Center for Biodiversity
    - UPLB Museum of Natural History
    - Flatrocks – creek usually frequented by hikers
    - Mudspring – Presumed volcanic crater of Mt. Makiling
    - Peak 2 – Highest peak of Mt. Makiling
    - Pook ni Maria Makiling, an eco-tourism site adjacent to the Jamboree Site, National Arts Center, and U.P. Los Baños
    - Boy Scouts of the Philippines and Jamboree Site – a campsite at the foot of Mount Makiling adjacent to U.P. Los Baños, which is being managed by the Boy Scouts of the Philippines and the site of the 10th World Scout Jamboree in 1959, the 1st and 12th Asia Pacific Jamboree in 1973 and 1991, and the 1st ASEAN Jamboree in 1993.
    - National Arts Center – a patch of land at the foot of Mount Makiling adjacent to U.P. Los Baños, which is being managed by the Cultural Center of the Philippines and the site of the Philippine High School for the Arts, a special school for young artist scholars.
  - International Rice Research Institute
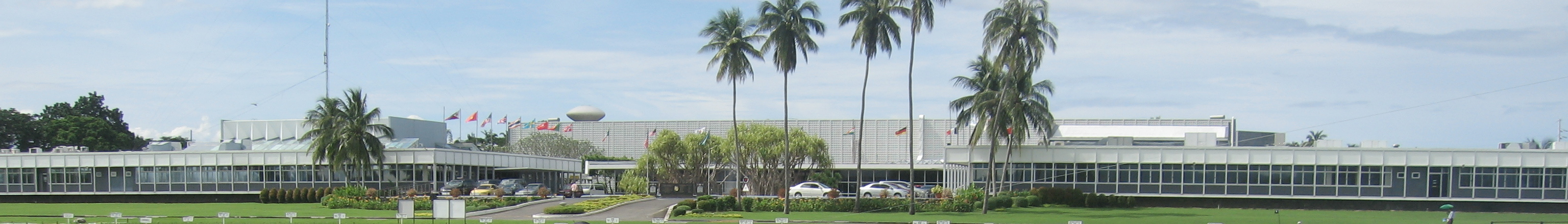
    International Rice Research Institute
  - Philippine Rice Research Institute
  - Dairy Training & Research Institute
  - Philippine Carabao Center at UPLB (PCC at UPLB) – conducts R&D in water buffalo; implements other programs related to water buffalo development; one of the 13 regional centers of PCC (see the link below)
  - Agricultural and Life Sciences Complex
    - National Institute of Molecular Biology and Biotechnology (NIMBB/BIOTECH) – UPLB
    - Institute of Plant Breeding
    - APEC Center for Technology Exchange and Training for Small and Medium Enterprises (ACTETSME)
    - National Crop Protection Center (NCPC)
    - College of Agriculture AgriPark
  - Baker Hall (also known as Los Baños Internment Camp during World War II)
- University of the Philippines Open University
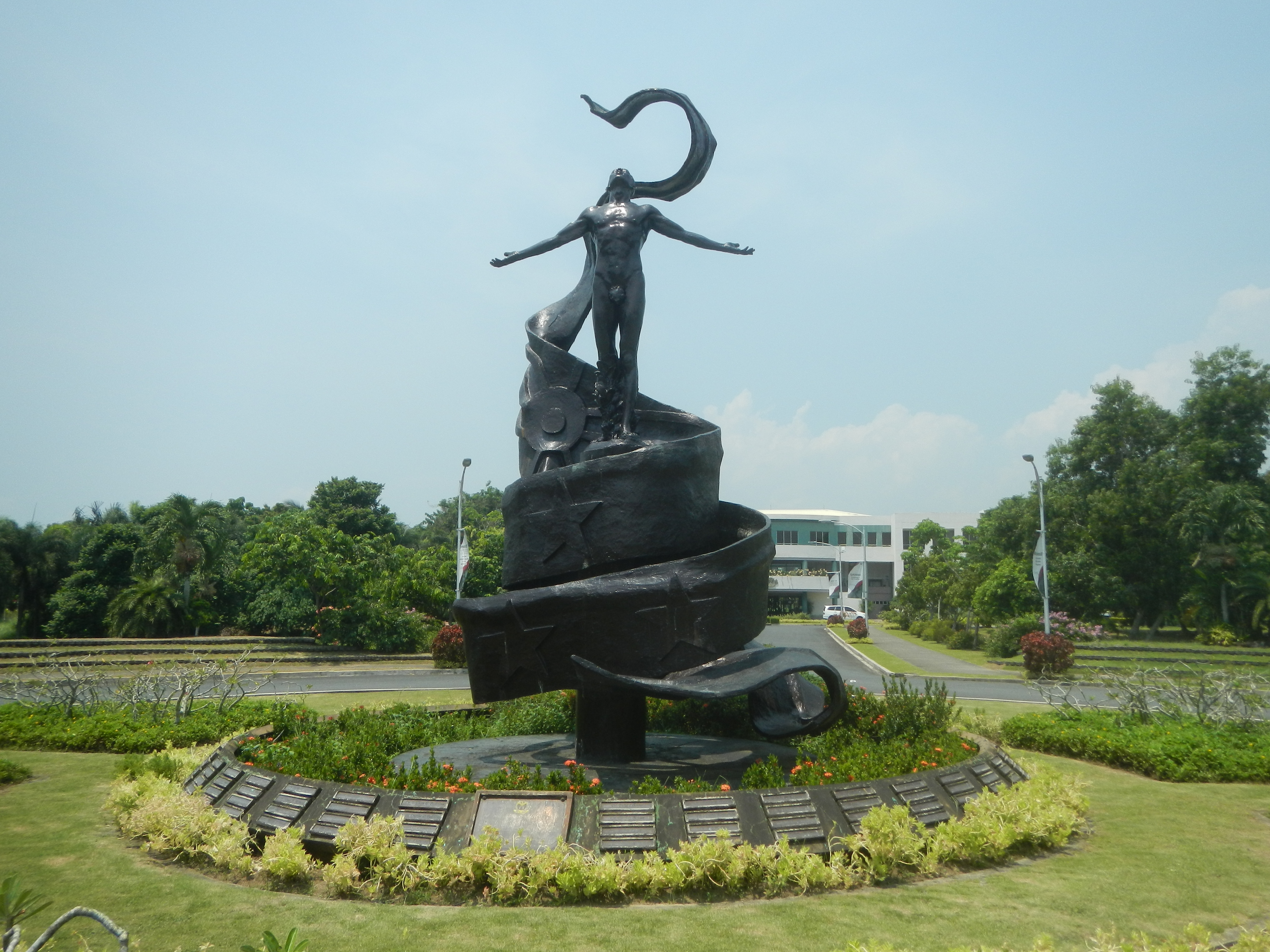
  University of the Philippines Open University (UPOU)
- Philippine Council for Agriculture, Aquatic, and Natural Resources Research and Development (PCAARRD)
- Department of Science and Technology Regional Office for Region IV (DOST IV)
- Magnetic Hill
- Dampalit Falls
- Immaculate Conception Parish – a centuries-old church at the town proper (Poblacion/Bayan)
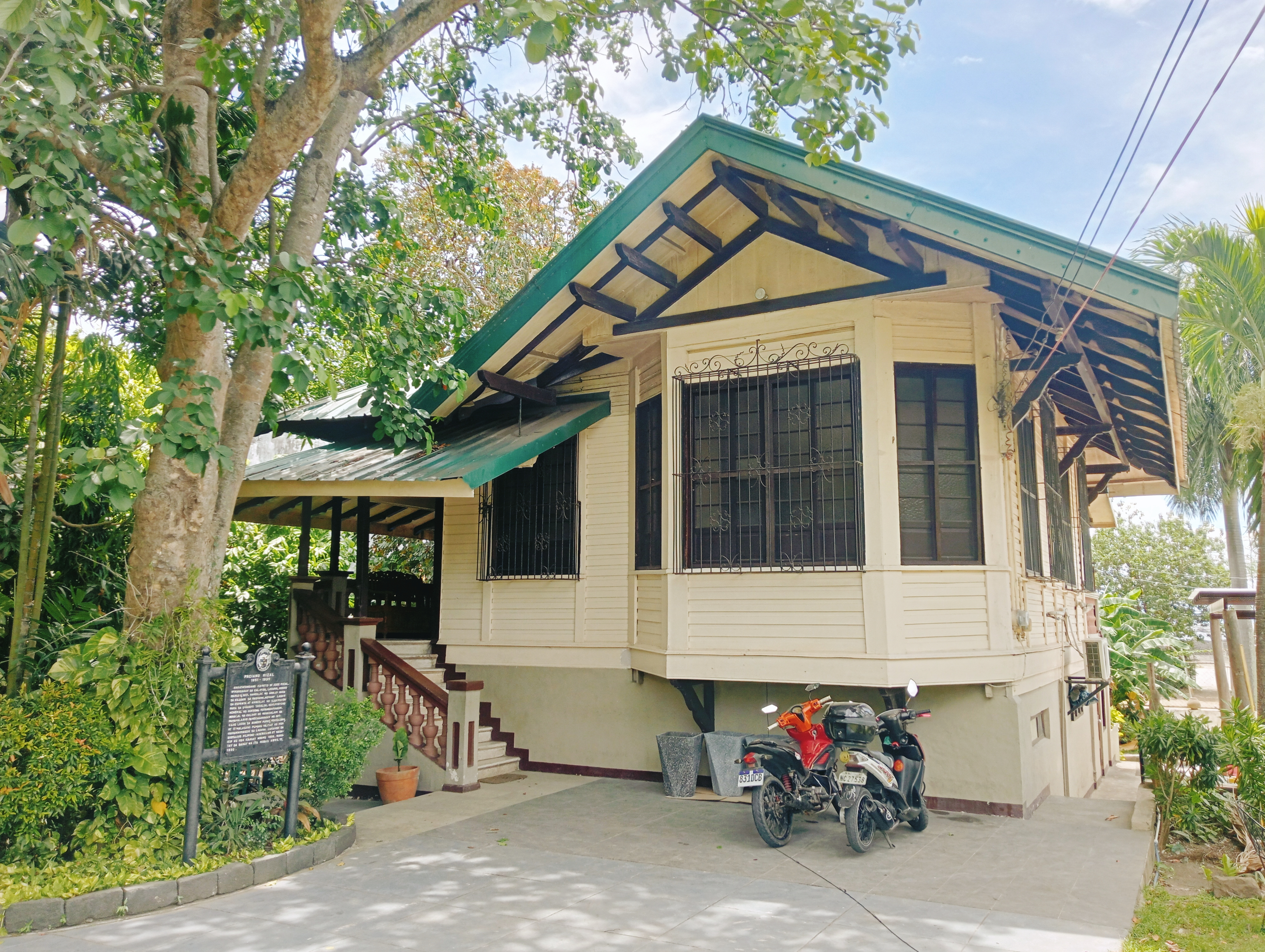
- Paciano Rizal Shrine
  Paciano Rizal Shrine – house of Paciano Rizal, brother of National Hero Jose Rizal
- Paciano Rizal Park – park dedicated to Paciano Rizal, brother of National Hero Jose Rizal
- Trace Aqua Sports Complex and Museum – aquatic sports venue for the 2005 SEA Games and Philippine Olympic Festival
- Yamashita Shrine – execution site of Gen. Homma and Gen. Yamashita

== Education ==
The Los Baños Schools District Office governs all educational institutions within the municipality. It oversees the management and operations of all private and public, from primary to secondary schools.

There are 16 daycare schools in Los Baños, managed by DSWD and local government.

=== Primary and elementary schools ===
- Bagong Silang Elementary School
- Bayog Elementary School
- Bernaldo N. Calara Elementary School
- Christian School International
- Hasik Bagong Buhay Christian School
- Joy in Learning School
- Lalakay Elementary School
- Liceo de Los Baños
- Liceo de Los Baños
- Lopez Elementary School
- Los Baños Central Elementary School
- Los Baños Faith Christian School
- Malinta Elementary School
- Maquiling School
- Maranatha Elementary School
- Mayondon Elementary School
- Morning Star Montessori School Inc.
- Saint Anthony School-LB
- San Antonio Elementary School
- South Hill School
- Tadlac Elementary School
- The Learning Place International
- Tuntungin Elementary School

=== Secondary schools ===
- Los Baños National High School
- Los Baños National High School – Poblacion
- Tuntungin-Putho Integrated National High School

=== Higher educational institutions ===
University of the Philippines Los Baños main library

Los Baños also hosts two constituent universities of the University of the Philippines System: the University of the Philippines Los Baños and University of the Philippines Open University, along with other foreign and local and international research centers, such as the International Rice Research Institute, the ASEAN Center for Biodiversity, the Philippine Rice Research Institute, Philippine Carabao Center, and the Southeast Asian Ministers of Education Organization-Southeast Asian Regional Center for Graduate Study and Research in Agriculture(SEAMEO-SEARCA) at UPLB making the town a temporary home for tens of thousands of both local and foreign undergraduate and graduate students, researchers and support staff.

- Colegio De Los Baños
- Laguna State Polytechnic University
- Trace College
- University of the Philippines Los Baños
- University of the Philippines Open University

== Notable people ==
- Paciano Rizal – military general and revolutionary; older brother of José Rizal
- Rizalina Ilagan – anti-martial law activist that was abducted by state security agents and disappeared with nine other activists in what is believed to be the single biggest case of involuntary disappearance during Ferdinand Marcos' martial law in the Philippines that later came to be known as the Southern Tagalog 10.
- Tony Mabesa – National Artist of the Philippines for Theater.
- Ricardo Lantican – National Scientist of the Philippines for Plant Breeding
- Bienvenido O. Juliano – National Scientist of the Philippines for Biochemistry
- Aloysius Baes – environmental chemist, environmental and pro-democracy activist, educator, and musician.
- Rogel Mari Sese – Filipino astrophysicist who is known for being a proponent of space science in the Philippines.
- Jonas Baes – composer
- Bonifacio Ilagan – writer, filmmaker, journalist, and activist.
- Caesar Perez – 12th Vice Governor of Laguna and former Los Baños Mayor
- Cielito Habito – economist, professor, and former NEDA Director-General
- Emerlinda R. Roman – educator, university administrator, and 19th President of the University of the Philippines
- Benjamin Madrigal Jr. – 51st Chief of Staff of the Armed Forces of the Philippines
- Bryan Gahol – former Filipino professional basketball player in the Philippine Basketball Association.

== Sister cities ==
- Davis, California, United States
