= UAAP Season 76 swimming championships =

The swimming championships of Season 76 of the University Athletic Association of the Philippines were held at the Trace Aquatic Center, Los Baños, Laguna with the University of the Philippines (UP) as event host, from September 19 to 22, 2013. Ateneo de Manila University was the defending men's and boys division champions. The reigning women's and girls titlists were UP and University of the East (UE), respectively.

At the end of the four-day competition, UP clinched a double championship in the seniors division: the 17th title in the men's and a five-peat for the women's. Ateneo won their ninth straight UAAP crown, while UE achieved a three-peat plum. Further, there was a total of 34 new UAAP records that were established: 7 in the men's division, 12 in women's, 10 in boys', and 5 in girls'.

== Point System ==
Ranking is determined by a point system, similar to that of the overall championship. The points given are based on the swimmer's/team's finish in the finals of an event, which include only the top eight finishers from the preliminaries. The gold medalist(s) receive 15 points, silver gets 12, bronze has 10. The following points are given in order of subsequent finish: 8, 6, 4, 2, and 1.

Pos.	Pts.
1st	15
2nd	12
3rd	10
4th	8
5th	6
6th	4
7th	2
8th	1

== Medal table and rankings ==
=== Men's tournament ===
==== Team standings ====
Rank	Team	Medals				Points
Rank	Team	1st place, gold medalist(s)	2nd place, silver medalist(s)	3rd place, bronze medalist(s)	**Total**	Points
1st place, gold medalist(s)	UP	9	5	8	22	**452**
2nd place, silver medalist(s)	La Salle	6	6	5	17	**301**
3rd place, bronze medalist(s)	Ateneo	6	6	6	18	**283**
4	UST	1	5	3	9	**175**
5	UE	0	0	0	0	**18**
6	**Adamson**	0	0	0	0	**0**

Season host in **boldface**.

=== Women's tournament ===
==== Team standings ====
Rank	Team	Medals				Points
Rank	Team	1st place, gold medalist(s)	2nd place, silver medalist(s)	3rd place, bronze medalist(s)	**Total**	Points
1st place, gold medalist(s)	UP	13	14	6	33	**587**
2nd place, silver medalist(s)	Ateneo	8	6	5	19	**387**
3rd place, bronze medalist(s)	La Salle	0	1	8	9	**115**
4	UE	0	0	0	0	**2**
5	**Adamson**	0	0	0	0	**0**
—	UST	Withdrew				

Season host in **boldface**.

=== Boys' tournament ===
==== Team standings ====
Rank	Team	Medals				Points
Rank	Team	1st place, gold medalist(s)	2nd place, silver medalist(s)	3rd place, bronze medalist(s)	**Total**	Points
1st place, gold medalist(s)	UST	15	9	7	31	**567**
2nd place, silver medalist(s)	UST	-	-	-	-	**239**
3rd place, bronze medalist(s)	UST	-	-	-	-	**204**
4	UE	-	-	-	-	**138**
5	UP	-	-	-	-	**93**

=== Girls' tournament ===
==== Team standings ====
Rank	Team	Medals				Points
Rank	Team	1st place, gold medalist(s)	2nd place, silver medalist(s)	3rd place, bronze medalist(s)	**Total**	Points
1st place, gold medalist(s)	UE	-	-	-	-	**403**
2nd place, silver medalist(s)	UST	-	-	-	-	**371**
3rd place, bronze medalist(s)	DLSZ	-	-	-	-	**197**
4	UPIS	-	-	-	-	**173**

== Medal winners ==
=== Men's division ===
Event	Gold	Silver	Bronze
200 m medley relay	Ateneo de Manila University	University of Santo Tomas	De La Salle University
100 m freestyle	NGUI Axel Toni Steven	WALKER Charles William	CASTELO Gabriel Lorenzo
