= Grace Nono =

Filipino musician (born 1965)

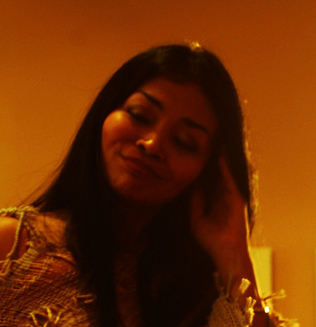
- Born: Grace S. Nono; May 6, 1965 (age 61); Butuan, Philippines
- Education: University of the Philippines Baguio (Note: Bachelor's degree awarded by the University of the Philippines Diliman, as UP Baguio was then an extension college of the former) (BA); University of the Philippines Diliman (MA); Yale University (MA); New York University (PhD)
- Musical career
- Genres: World, OPM, folk
- Occupations: Singer; ethnomusicologist; scholar of Philippine shamanism; cultural worker
- Website: gracenono.com

Grace Nono is a Filipino singer, known for her musical style based on traditional Filipino rhythms. She is also an ethnomusicologist, scholar of Philippine shamanism, and cultural worker.

== Early life and education ==
Grace Nono was born on May 6, 1965, in Butuan, Agusan, Caraga region, northeastern Mindanao, southern Philippines, years before Agusan was divided into two independent provinces. She was raised in the historic town of Bunawan, now a part of Agusan del Sur. Her mother, Ramona R. Sacote, originally from Camiguin island, was an English and mathematics teacher, writer, and school administrator during the foundational years of what is now the Agusan Del Sur State College of Agriculture and Technology. Her father, Igmedio A. Nono, originally from Nueva Ecija, was a farmer leader who promoted land reform, established cooperatives, and advocated organic farming long before it was widespread.

Grace attended the East Bunawan Central School where she graduated at the top of her class in 1976. After a year at the Agusan National High School, she moved to the Philippine High School for the Arts where she majored in Theatre Arts, finishing in 1981. Grace went on to complete a bachelor's degree in Humanities in 1986 from the UP College Baguio, then an extension campus of the University of the Philippines Diliman. She proceeded to do a master's degree in Area Studies focusing on the Philippines in 2004 from UP Diliman in Quezon City. In 2009, Grace began her doctoral studies in Ethnomusicology at New York University, graduating in 2014. Grace received a second master's degree in Religious and Gender Studies in 2019 from Yale University. She has been a fellow of the Asian Cultural Council in New York in 2008 and in 2017–19, the UCLA Asia Pacific Performance Exchange in Los Angeles in 2006, the Asia-Pacific Cultural Center for UNESCO in Kyoto in 2009, the Asian Institute of Management's Managing the Arts Program in Makati in 2003, and the Global Research Initiative in Florence in 2013. From 2015 to 2016, Grace was awarded a post-doctoral position at the Harvard Divinity School’s Women’s Studies in Religion Program, with residency at the Center for the Study of World Religions in Cambridge.

== Performance work ==
Grace is known for her music performances that draw from Philippine sung oral traditions. She has performed in over sixty cities and venues in over twenty countries in Asia, Europe, and North America. These performances have included solo concerts at the Cultural Center of the Philippines in Manila (1995, 2017), the Metropolitan Museum of Manila (1995), the House of the World's Cultures in Berlin (2005), the Circulo de Bellas Artes in Madrid (2006), Mercat de les Flors in Barcelona (2006), the Asia Society in New York (2013, 2015), the Renee Weiler Hall in New York (2012), the Irish Arts Center and Symphony Space in New York (2010, 2011, 2012, 2013, 2014), the Soul Force Sacred Music Festival in Pasadena (2019), the World Exposition on Nature's Wisdom in Nagoya (2005), the WOMAD-Minato Mirai in Yokohama (1996), the National Museum in Singapore (2009), the Singapore Arts Festival (2003), the Hong Kong Festival for the Arts (1998), the Rainforest World Music Festival in Kuching (2018), Asia Society Hong Kong (2013); collaborations with the Asian Fantasy Orchestra in New Delhi, Bombay, Tokyo, Nagoya, Osaka, Miyazaki (1998), Bangkok, Vientiane, Yangon, Hanoi and Ho Chi Minh City (2003), and with the Gathering of Drummers in Prague and Bratislava (2009); various artists concerts at the Lincoln Center La Casita Festival in New York (2009), the Music Village Festival in London (2002), the World Music Festival in Penang (2012); guest performances and presentations in Monte Carlo (2006), Paris (2002, 2006), Ithaca (2006), Boston (2014, 2016), Toronto (2014), Vancouver (2014, 2016), Huairou (1995), Nanning (2006), Shanghai (2008), Kaohsiung (2005), Seoul, Jaraseom (2008), Jakarta, Honolulu (2006, 2016), Los Angeles (2006), San Francisco (2008), San Diego (2002), Chicago (2002), Ann Arbor (2016), Bloomington (2016), Richmond (2016), Blairstown (2014), Fairfield (2014), Quezon City, Cebu, Iloilo, Roxas, Bikol, Baguio, Sagada, Butuan, Davao, Cagayan de Oro, General Santos, Zambales, Cagayan Valley, Palawan and Mindoro.

== Music biography ==
Grace began singing for audiences at the age of three when her mother often showed her off to her colleagues. At age six Grace enrolled in the East Bunawan Central School and performed Western popular tunes during school programs. At the Agusan National High School, she joined a choir that specialized in Euro-American avant garde-styled arrangements of local folk songs. When she moved to the Philippine High School for the Arts, she played guitar for the school rondalla ensemble that specialized in Spanish-influenced lowland Christian music. At the University of the Philippines-Baguio, she sang in a band called Montanosa that specialized in protest songs in the manner of American 60s folk music. Upon her college graduation from the University of the Philippines-Diliman, she joined a band that played American jazz standards. Then, as a member of the Baguio Arts Guild she fronted a punk-rock group called The Blank that performed American and British underground music. The Blank gained a sizable following in the northern city of Baguio and in the Philippines’ capital, Manila. Almost famous playing for enthusiastic crowds but confused with her musical direction, Grace decided to quit singing. "I realized … that there was a yawning divide between my reality and the mission that one teacher at the Philippine High School for the Arts had stated for me: 'to search for the Filipino cultural identity,'" she wrote in The Shared Voice.

Shortly thereafter, Grace met oral traditional singers in the mountains that connected her home province of Agusan with the provinces of Davao and Bukidnon. She noted in a lecture: "I could not believe my ears when I first heard their voices. I could not locate them in music I was taught in school patterned after colonial models." At that point, Grace began the process of "finding her voice" that she associated with voice decolonization.

In the 1990s, Grace became one of the pillars of what was then called the “Philippine alternative music scene,” a loose movement that was picked up by the major record labels. With the help of her friends Noni Buencamino, Alex Cruz, Boy Yunchengco and Dodong Viray, and in collaboration with Bob Aves, composer, arranger, record producer and musical director, Grace released several multi-awarded and high-profile solo recordings that fused popular and traditional music styles: Tao Music (Record Plant 1992, BMG Pilipinas 1993), Opo (BMG Pilipinas 1995), and Isang Buhay (BMG Pilipinas 1998).

When the major record labels withdrew their support for music that did not comply with commercial trends, Grace was expected to shift to a more market driven sound in order to survive the music business. She, however, remained steadfast in her musical vision. Without corporate support, she independently co-produced other award-winning solo albums: Hulagpos: Women’s Music and Poetry (with prominent women poets Marra Pl. Lanot, Elynia Mabanglo, Luisa Igloria, among others, Arugaan ng Kalakasan 1999), Diwa (Tao Music 2008), and Dalit (Tao Music 2009). Grace also went deeper in her study of oral traditional musics, learning the performance of a few traditional chants from elderly singers in different parts of the Philippines. After the name of her daughter, Tao, Grace also co-established the independent record label Tao Music that released recordings of Philippine traditional music: Maguindanao Kulintang featuring Aga Mayo Butocan (1995), Pakaradia-an: Maranao Epic Chants and Instrumental Music featuring Sindao Banisil (1996), Marino: Hanunuo Mangyan Music and Chanted Poetry featuring Ulyaw Bat-ang, et al. (1998), Tudbulul Lunay Mogul: T’boli Hero of Lunay, the Place of Gongs and Music featuring Mendung Sabal (2002), and Kahimunan: Cultural Music of the Manobo, Higaonon and Banwaon of Agusan del Sur featuring Datu Yadup Salvador Placido, et al. (2002).

== Scholarship ==
Grace's training prepared her for both music performance and academic work. Following years of ethnographic engagements and graduate/post graduate studies, she has written at the intersections of Ethnomusicology, Indigenous Religious Studies, and Women's and Gender Studies. She has published two award-winning books in the Philippines - Song of the Babaylan: Living Voices, Medicines, Spiritualities of Philippine Ritualist-Oralist-Healers (Institute of Spirituality in Asia, 2013), edited by Carolina S. Malay, winner of the 2014 Gintong Aklat Book Award for Arts and Culture, and the 2014 Jaime Cardinal Sin Catholic Book Award for Spirituality, and The Shared Voice: Chanted and Spoken Narratives from the Philippines (Pasig: ANVIL Publishing and Fundacion Santiago, 2008), edited by Carolina S. Malay, winner of the 2009 National Book Award for Arts. She has also contributed articles to edited collections, namely: "Listen to Voices: The Tao Foundation Experience," in Intangible Cultural Heritage- NGOs’ Strategy in Achieving Sustainable Development: The Relationship between Safeguarding Intangible Cultural Heritage and Education (Korea: International Information and Networking Centre for Intangible Cultural Heritage in the Asia Pacific Region under the Auspices of UNESCO, 2018), "Locating the Babaylan: Philippine Shamans and Discourses of Religion, Spirituality, Medicine and Healing," in Spirituality and Health (Quezon City: Institute of Spirituality in Asia, 2017), "Audible Travels: Oral/Aural Traditional Performances and the Transnational Spread of a Philippine Indigenous Religion," in Back from the Crocodile’s Belly: Philippine Babaylan Studies and the Struggle for Indigenous Memory (California: Center for Babaylan Studies, 2013).

As speaker, Grace has delivered public, conference, and class lecture-performances about voice and decolonization, Philippine oral traditions, Philippine ritualists (shamans), and the intersections of ecology, sound, medicine, and spirituality. In the last decade and a half she has spoken at the University of Michigan (2016), Indiana University (2016), Brandeis University (2016), Harvard Center for the Study of World Religions (2016), Harvard Divinity School (2015), the Harvard Humanities Center (2014, 2016), the Harvard Memorial Church(2015), Boston College (2015), Berklee College of Music (2014), New York University (2014), Columbia University (2016), Cornell University (2006), University of Virginia (2008, 2016), Institute of American Indian Arts (2008), University of California-Los Angeles (2008, 2013), Los Angeles Public Library (2013), California State University-Fullerton (2013), Sonoma State University (2010), University of British Columbia (2014), St. John’s Cathedral-Toronto (2014), Sol Collective in Sacramento (2019), University of Hawaiʻi at Mānoa (2006, 2016),Hong Kong University (2008), the Asia-Pacific Cultural Center for UNESCO in Japan (2009), the Exposition on Nature’s Wisdom-Japan (2005), the ASEAN-Korea Conference (2005), the ASEAN Peoples Assembly Conference (2005), the University of the Philippines (2004, 2005, 2012), Ateneo de Manila University (2004), Miriam College (2005), De la Salle University (2009), Far Eastern University (2013), Lyceum of the Philippines University (2013), St. Scholastica’s College (2005), University of Santo Tomas (2003), Institute of Spirituality in Asia (2009, 2016), and the Agusan del Sur State College of Agriculture and Technology (2011).

As a teacher, Grace has taught courses on Music and Culture, and Philippine Traditional Arts at the University of the Philippines-Diliman; Local and Oral History at Miriam College; and Women and Shamanisms at the Harvard Divinity School.

== Cultural work ==
In addition to her work as artist and scholar, Grace is a devoted volunteer worker for Philippine cultural revitalization. She, together with friends in education, arts, and grassroots cultural work established the Tao Foundation for Culture and Arts in 1994. The Tao Foundation has published educational materials on Philippine traditional musics; organized school tours for Cultural Masters; mounted training programs for traditional performing arts, healing arts, and arts and crafts; and sponsored the schooling of selected indigenous scholars. In mid-2017, the Tao Foundation began to operate the Agusan del Sur- School of Living Traditions, a non-formal, community-based learning space where Cultural Masters transmit the knowledges and practices of indigenous languages, chants, dances, instruments-making and performance, traditional housebuilding, embroidery, grass weaving, pottery, traditional medicine, environmental regeneration, indigenous models of gender balance, inter-faith dialogue, leadership, and peace-building to the younger generations.

In its over twenty years of existence, the Tao Foundation has collaborated with local, national and transnational groups (1994–present) and has received support from the National Commission for Culture and Arts (2000, 2007, 2015, 2016), the Cultural Center of the Philippines (2005), Give2Asia (2014, 2015), Sanctuary Fund (2014, 2015), Toyota Foundation (2004), UNESCO (2006), Advocates of Philippine Fair Trade (2006, 2007), and the Australia-Philippines Community Cooperation Program (2007), and the province of Agusan del Sur (2007).

In addition to her work with the Tao Foundation, Grace—between 2014 and 2015—also headed the Artists Welfare Project, Inc., a national non-profit corporation established to contribute to Philippine artists’ wellbeing by 1) tapping into government agencies that provide welfare benefits to Filipino citizens; and by 2) pushing for legislation that will provide long-term solutions to Filipino artists’ vulnerable conditions.

== Awards ==
Grace has been recognized for her musical, scholarly, and cultural leadership work. She has received over forty-five awards, including:

Gintong Aklat Book Awards

Year	Work	Award
2014	Song of the Babaylan: Living Voices, Medicines, Spiritualities of Philippine Ritualist-Oralist-Healers	Best Book in Arts and Culture

Jaime Cardinal Sin Catholic Book Awards

Year	Work	Award
2014	Song of the Babaylan: Living Voices, Medicines, Spiritualities of Philippine Ritualist-Oralist-Healers	Best Book in Spirituality

National Book Awards

Year	Work	Award
2009	The Shared Voice: Chanted and Spoken Narratives from the Philippines	Best Book in Arts

University of the Philippines Alumni Association

Year	Awardee	Award
2011	Grace Nono	Distinguished University of the Philippines Alumni Award (Ethnic Music)

TOWNS Foundation

Year	Awardee	Award
2001	Grace Nono	The Outstanding Women in the Nation’s Service or TOWNS Award (Music and Performing Arts)

TOYM Foundation

Year	Awardee	Award
1994	Grace Nono	Ten Outstanding Young Men or TOYM Award (Arts)

National Press Club

Year	Awardee	Award
2003	Grace Nono	Best Ethnic Singer Award

Catholic Mass Media Awards

Year	Work	Award
2002	Diwa	Album of the Year Award
1996	Opo	Album of the Year Award
1994	Salidumay	Best Folk Recording Award

Katha Awards

Year	Work	Award
1999	Hulagpos: Women’s Poetry and Music	Best World Music Album Award
1999	Ambahan ni Lucia	Best Performance of a World Music Song based on Traditional Material Award
1999	Ambahan ni Lucia	Best World Music Song based on Traditional Material Award
1999	Dalit ng Paslit	Best Contemporary Blues Vocal Performance Award
1999	Dalit ng Paslit	Best Contemporary Blues Song Award
1998	Isang Buhay	Best World Music Album Award
1998	Isang Buhay	Best Record Producer Award
1998	Isang Buhay	Best Engineered Album Award
1998	Ader	Best Vocal Arrangement Award
1998	Anungan	Best World Music Song Award
1998	Anungan	Best World Music Vocal Performance Award
1998	Anungan	Best Instrumental Arrangement Accompanying Vocals Award
1998	Manama	Best Jazz Vocal Performance Award
1998	Pakaradia-an	Best Indigenous Music Album Award
1997	Iduyan Mo	Best Instrumental Arrangement Accompanying Vocals Award
1996	Opo	Album of the Year Award
1996	Opo	Best World Music Album Award
1996	Opo	Best Record Producer Award
1996	Kawayan and Yayeyan	Best Instrumental Arrangement Accompanying Vocals Award
1996	Alay	Best Folk Song Award
1996	Alay	Best Folk Vocal Performance Award
1996	Batang Lansangan and Pinoy ang Dating	Best Engineered Recording Award
1996	Bayani Ka	Best World Music Vocal Performance Award

Awit Awards

Year	Work	Award
1996	Dandansoy	Best Traditional Recording Award
1996	Opo	Best Album Design Award
1994	Grace Nono	Best New Female Artist Award
1994	Salidumay	Best Folk-Pop Recording Award

Filipino Music Video Awards

Year	Work	Award
1998	Anungan	Best Alternative Music Video
1998	Anungan	Best Video Cinematography

Women of Distinction Awards

Year	Awardee	Award
1996	Grace Nono	Women of Distinction Award (Arts and Contemporary Music)

Outstanding Cuyapeno Awards

Year	Awardee	Award
2002	Grace Nono	Outstanding Cuyapeno Award (Arts and Music)

Philippine Jaycees

Year	Awardee	Award
2001	Grace Nono	Bayaning Makabayan Achievers Award (Arts and Contemporary Music)
1999	Grace Nono	Outstanding Young Professional Award (Arts and Music)

Mabuhay Filipino Achievers Council

Year	Awardee	Award
2000	Grace Nono	Mabuhay Filipino Achievers Award (Music)
