= Jonas Baes =

Filipino composer

- Born: 1961 (age 63–64); Los Baños, Laguna
- Genres: Experimental
- Occupation: Composer

Jonas Baes (born 1961 in Los Baños, Laguna) is a Filipino composer. He enrolled in the University of the Philippines College of Music in 1977 as a student of Ramon P. Santos, and encountered the musical compositions of José Maceda, attended several seminar-workshops of visiting lecturers, and did research on the music of the Iraya-Mangyan people of Mindoro, which became the inspiration for his compositions. From 1992 to 1994, he studied with Mathias Spahlinger in Freiburg, Germany. Baes is known for writing music utilizing "unorthodox" musical instruments like bean-pod rattles, leaves, iron-nail chimes, as well as various Asian instruments such as bamboo scrapers, bamboo flutes, and vocal music using Asian vocal techniques. His early works in the 1980s were influenced by Maceda in the use of large numbers of performers, while in the 1990s he experimented with various methods by which the audience becomes integral in the performance. At the beginning of the new century, Baes experiments with notions of structure-agency integration [after Anthony Giddens] and simulacrum [after Jean Baudrillard]. It is typical for social theory to influence the work of Baes who has made a mark on contemporary music and cultural politics in the Asian region. Baes is also active as an ethnomusicologist and writer.

== Compositions ==
Some of Jonas Baes' musical compositions include:

BANWA [imagined community, after Benedict Anderson] for four bamboo scrapers, "bamui" trail caller, "sarunai" oboe, "khaen" mouth organ, and about a hundred iron nail chimes distributed among the audience [1997/2001]

WALA [nothingness] for seven or hundreds of men's voices [1997/2001]

DALUY [flow] interval music for five animator-percussionists and about a hundred bird whistles distributed among the audience [1994]

IBO-IBON [birdwoman] for dancer wearing small bells, two large wind chimes passed around the audience, four animator-callers, and iron nail chimes played by the audience [1996]

SALAYSAY [narratives/ inspired by Jean Baudrillard] for solo voice, three percussionists, and pairs of pebbles distributed among the audience

PATANGIS-BUWAYA [and the crocodile weeps] for four sub-contrabass recorders or any blown instruments [2003]

PANTAWAG [music for calling people] for 15 bamboo scrapers, 15 palm leaves, and 20 muffled "forest" voices [1981]

BASBASAN [blessing] for 20 bean-pod rattles and 20 muffled men's voices [1983]
