= Aloysius Baes =

Filipino chemist, environmentalist and activist

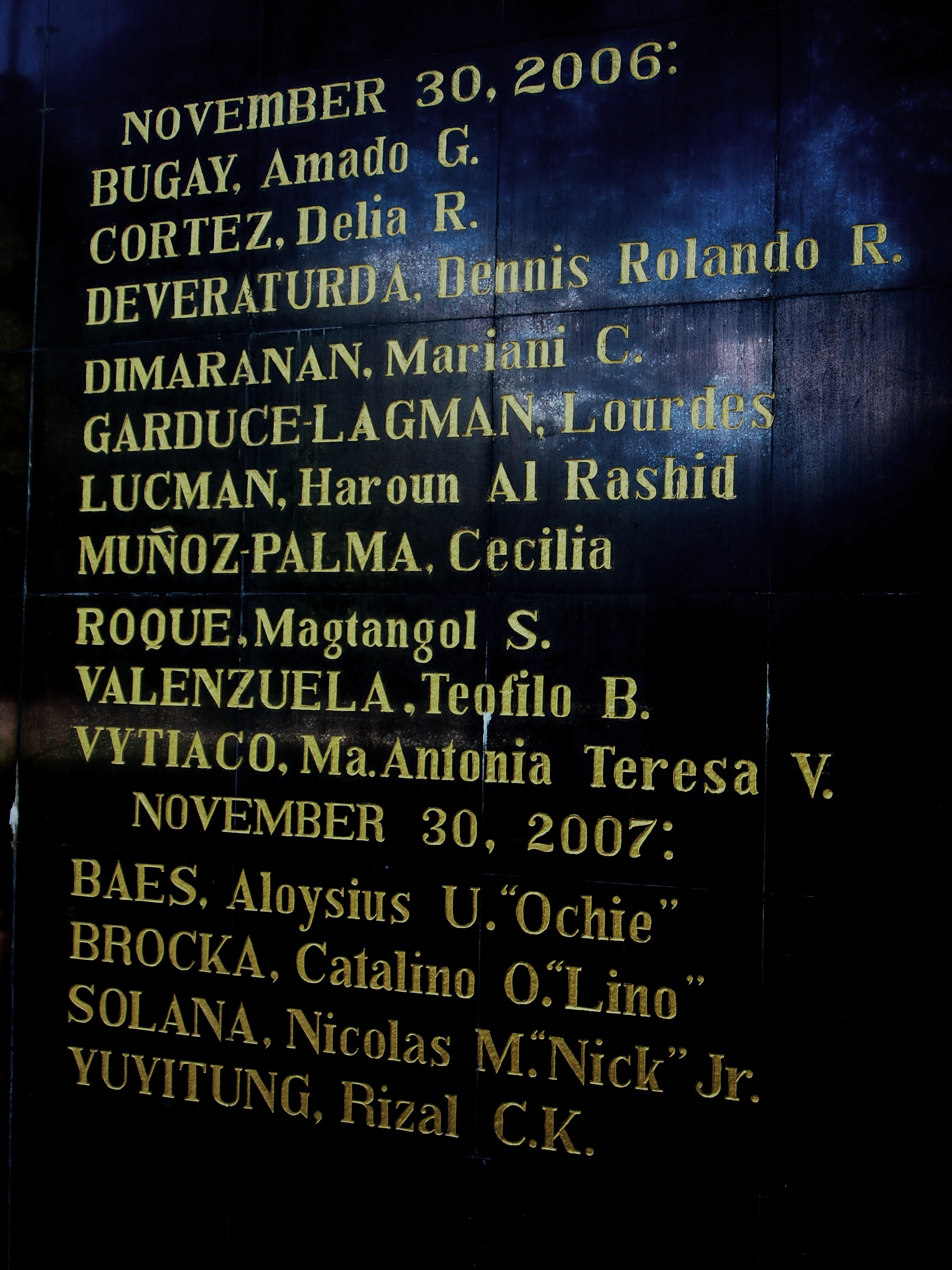
- Detail of the Wall of Remembrance at the Bantayog ng mga Bayani, photographed on 15 November 2018, showing names from the 2007 batch of Bantayog honorees, including that of Aloysius Baes
- Born: Aloysius Ureta Baes; July 28, 1948; Los Baños, Laguna, Philippines
- Died: December 21, 2006 (aged 58); Quezon City, Philippines
- Education: University of the Philippines Los Baños (BS)
- Awards: Honored at the Bantayog ng mga Bayani wall of remembrance

Aloysius “Ochie” Ureta Baes (July 28, 1948 – December 21, 2006) was a Filipino chemist, environmentalist, pro-democracy activist, educator and musician.

Late in his career, Baes was best known for his environmental activism, playing key roles in exposing the role of mining and logging companies in the 1991 Ormoc tragedy, the Marcopper mining disaster, the Rapu-rapu mining disaster, and in the campaign to hold the US military responsible for the toxic wastes left behind after the closure of Subic Naval Base and Clark Air Base. He was also a key figure in the founding of Advocates of Science and Technology for the People (Agham) and of the Center for Environmental Concerns-Philippines (CEC-Phil).

Before all that, however, he was better known for his role in the resistance against the dictatorship of Ferdinand Marcos, for which his name is inscribed at the Bantayog ng mga Bayani, which honors the martyrs and heroes who fought the dictatorship. He is similarly honored at "Hagdan ng Malayang Kamalayan" memorial steps at his alma mater - the University of the Philippines Los Baños.

The protest songs he wrote while incarcerated under Martial Law became popular and influential, eventually being considered among the 'top hits of martial law' sung by detainees in political prisons throughout the Philippines.

== See also ==
- University of the Philippines Los Baños
