= UPLB Museum of Natural History =

University museum in Laguna, Philippines

- "UPLB Museum" or "MNH"
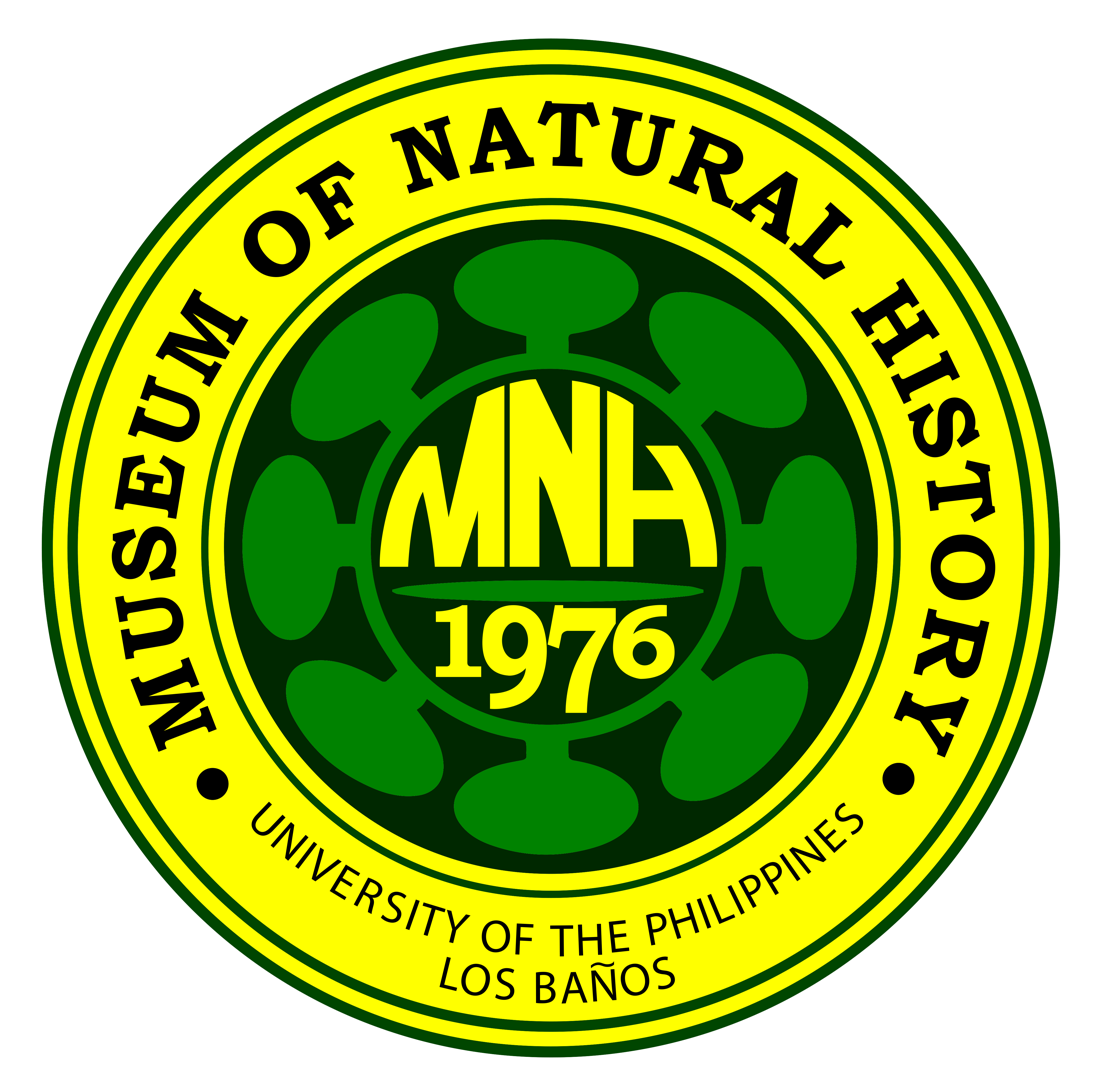
- The UPLB Museum of Natural History logo depicts eight green leaves, which represent the eight sections of the museum.

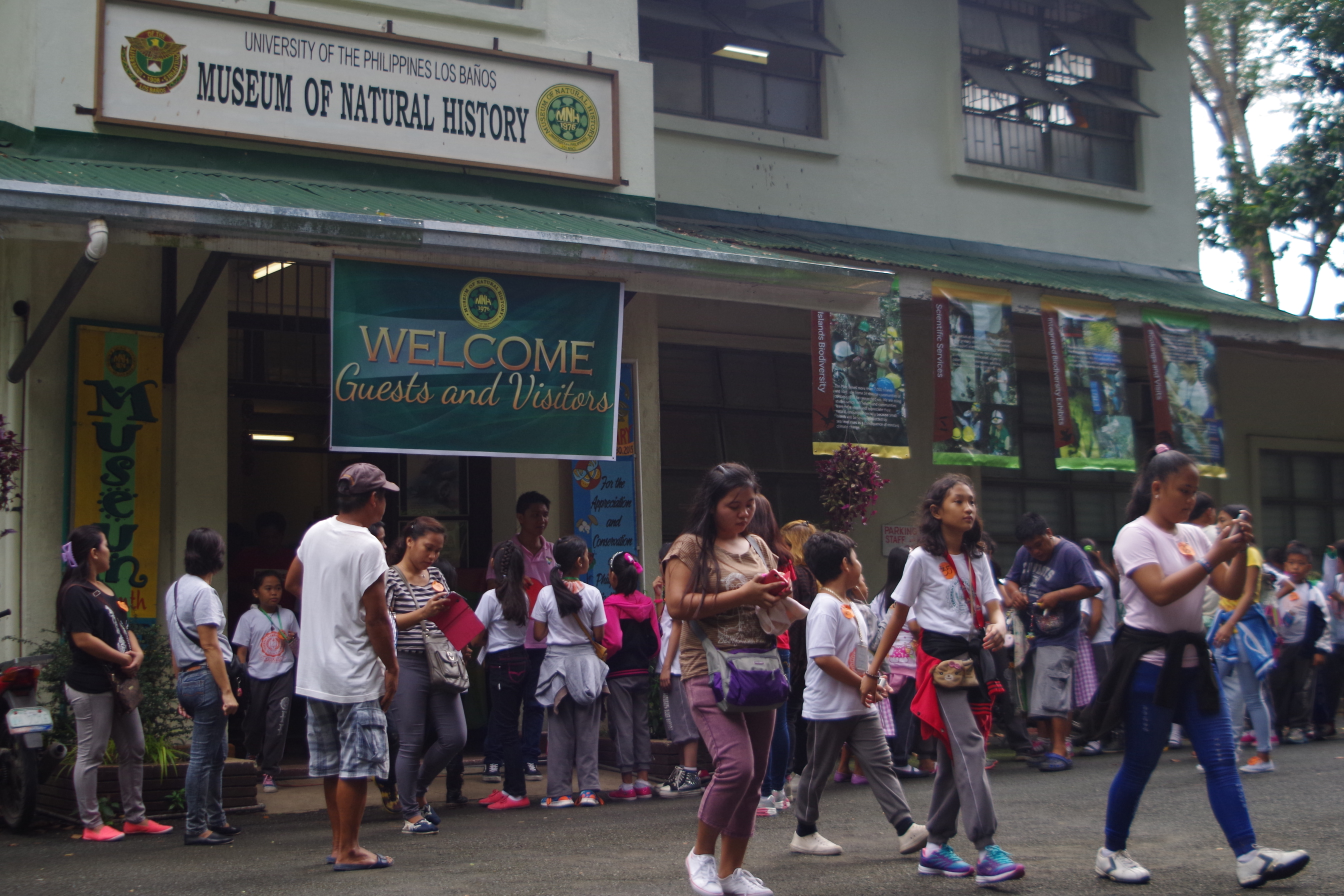
- The front of the UPLB Museum of Natural History, with visiting school students.
- Established: September 30, 1976
- Location: University of the Philippines Los Baños
- Coordinates: 14°9′21.66″N 121°14′10.59″E
- Type: Natural history museum
- Accreditation: Southern Luzon Association of Museums
- Key holdings: DS Rabor Wildlife Collection, LA Corpuz-Raros Acarological Collection
- Collections: Preserved biological specimens in skins and fluid
- Collection size: >600,000 specimens
- Visitors: Average of 25,000 yearly
- Director: Dr. Marian P. De Leon
- Owner: Government of the Philippines
- Employees: 17
- Public transit access: Jeepneys only from UPLB lower campus
- Parking: On site (no charge)
- Website: mnh.uplb.edu.ph

The UPLB Museum of Natural History (also known as MNH) is a natural science and natural history museum within the University of the Philippines Los Baños (UPLB) campus. It serves as a center for documentation, research, and information of flora and fauna of the Philippines. The museum is one of the research and extension units of the UPLB and its role parallels that of a library for written records.

== History ==
The museum was established through the approval of the University of the Philippines Board of Regents during its 877th meeting in 1976. According to the announcement published at the time, it was to be "organized out of the staff and physical resources of the existing museum and herbaria at UPLB, including the hortorium and culture collections of separate departments in the Colleges of Agriculture, Forestry, and Sciences and Humanities."

Its founding director was the late Professor Juan V. Pancho, a plant taxonomist of national and international acclaim and an indefatigable mentor to a select group of Filipino and foreign plant taxonomists.

During World War II, the then UP College of Agriculture and the insect collections of Dr. Charles Fuller Baker (the second Dean of the College), Dr. Leopoldo Uichanco (The Father of Entomology in the Philippines and Pioneer of Insect Ecology) and many other entomologists were burned and destroyed.

=== Early deans' study of Mount Makiling ===
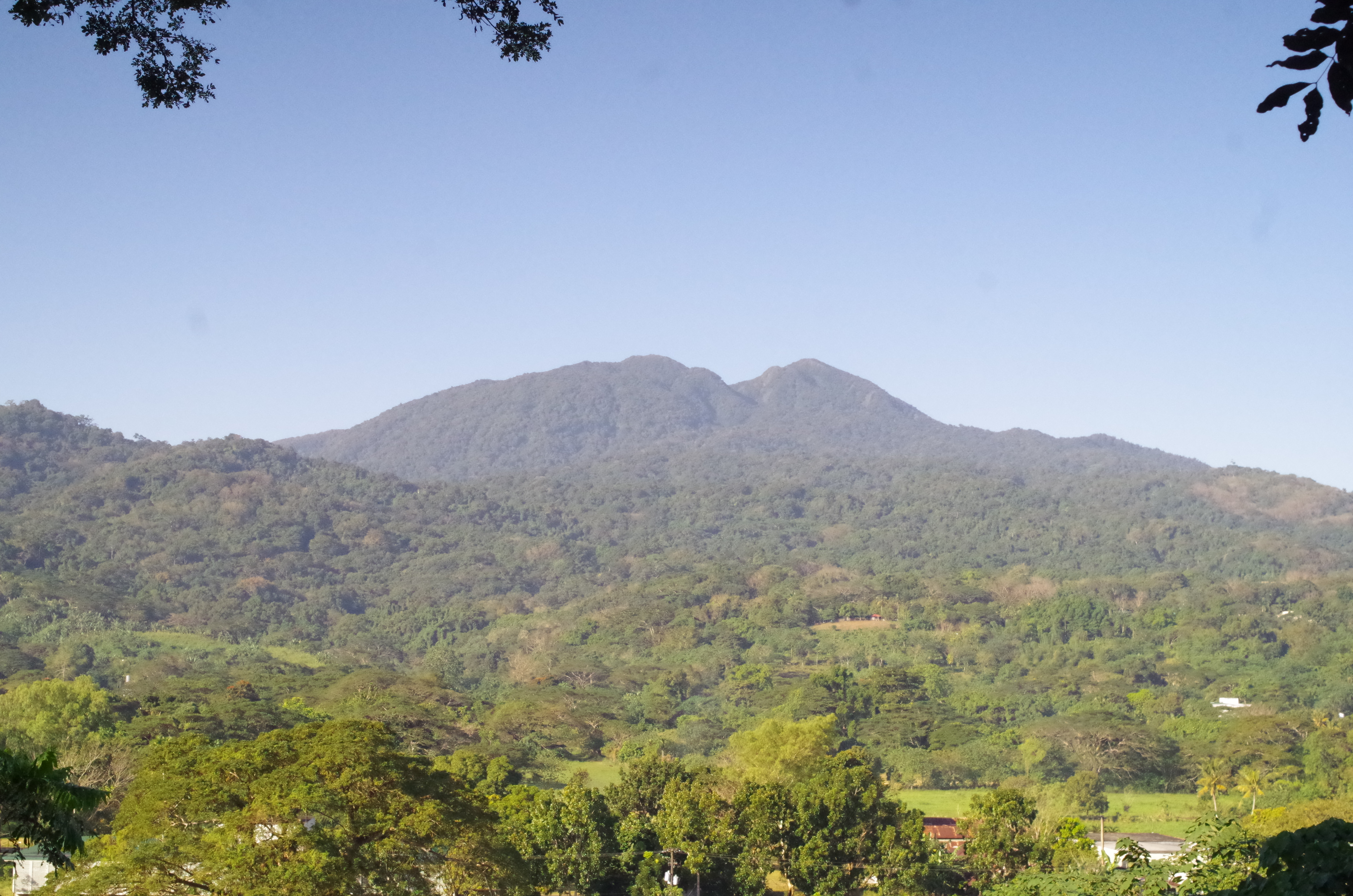
Mount Makiling's peaks as seen from Sison's Hill inside the UP Los Banos campus

The two American deans, Copeland and Baker, studied the vegetation of Mount Makiling, which is the best scientifically studied mountain of the country, with materials dating back to the time of the Malaspina Expedition in 1789.

== Sections ==
The museum has more than 600,000 specimens distributed to the following sections: Botanical Herbarium, Entomological Museum, Forestry Herbarium and Wood Collection, Mycological Herbarium, Hortorium, Microbial and Algal Culture Collections, Zoological and Wildlife Museum, and the Integrated Biodiversity Exhibit.

=== Botanical Herbarium ===
The Botanical Herbarium (Herbarium Code: CAHUP, College of Agriculture Herbarium UP) houses approximately 70,000 specimens representing about 12,000 plant species. The collection is composed of bryophyte, pteridophyte, and spermatophyte specimens collected from across the Philippines, many of which are from Mt. Makiling in Luzon Island.

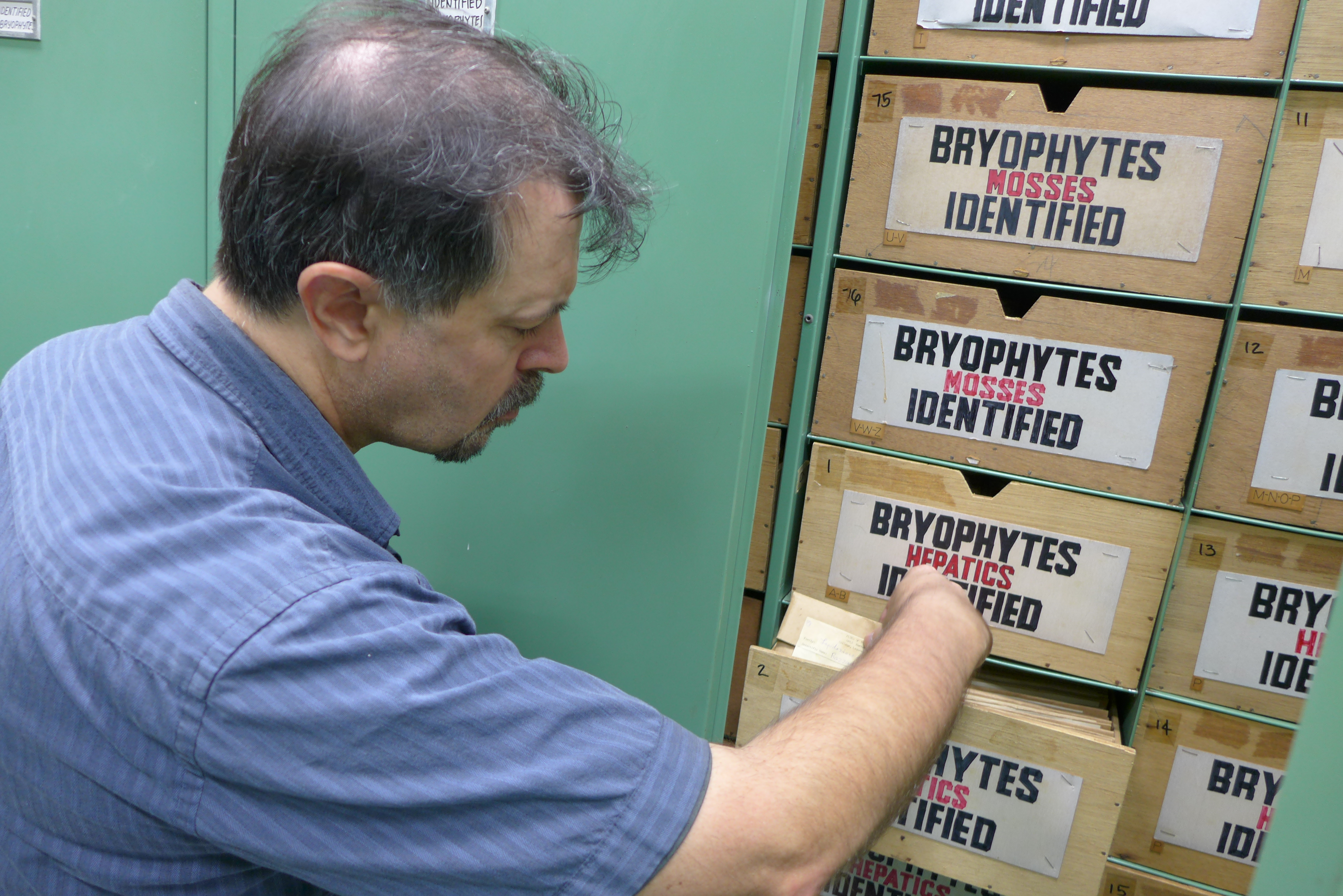
The UPLB Museum of Natural History has a large collection of bryophytes.

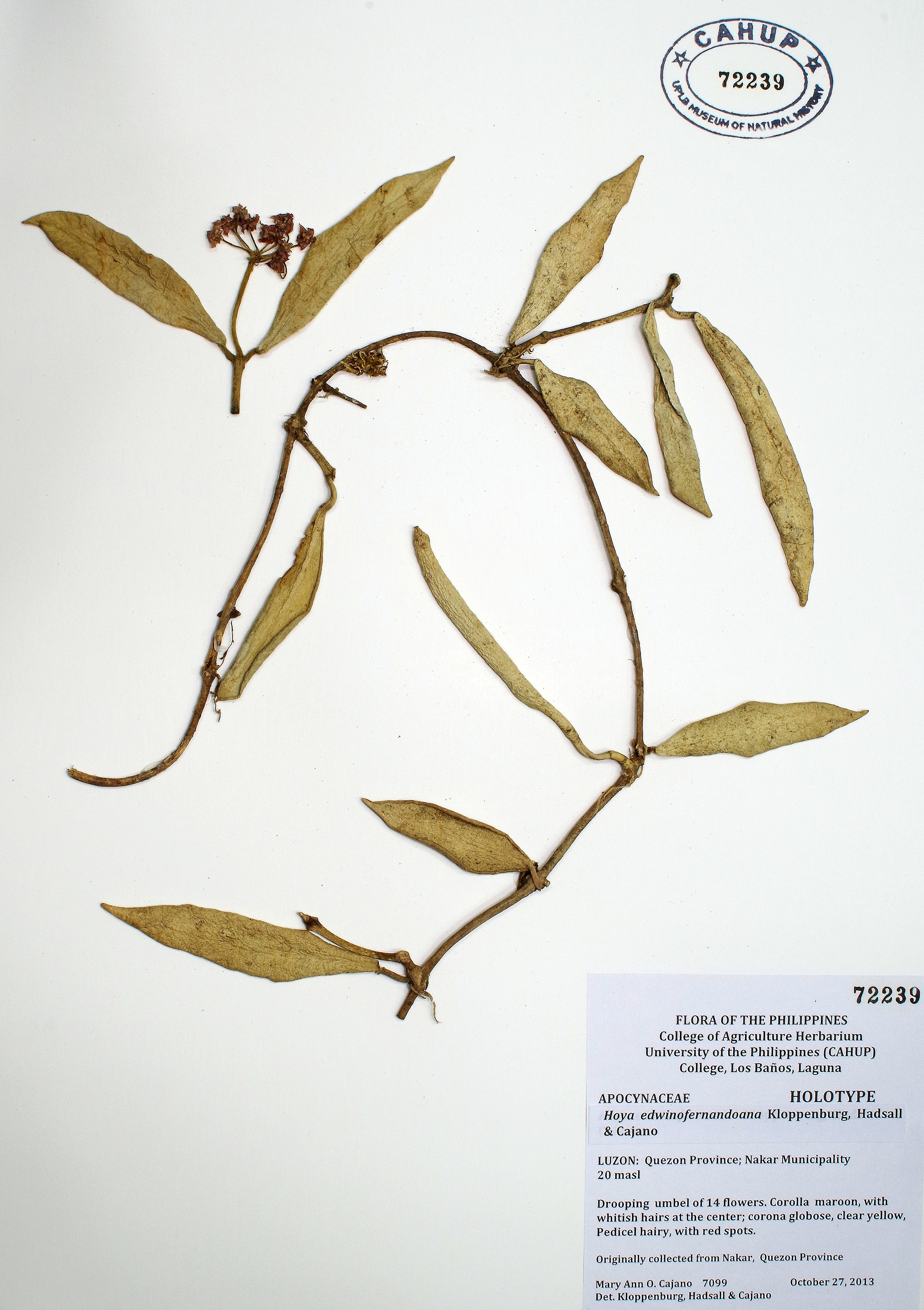
The holotype specimen of Hoya edwinofernandoi, named after Dr. Edwino S. Fernando, an eminent plant taxonomist and an UPLB MNH curator.

The Institute of Biological Sciences' small Room C329 is a treasure trove which houses 74,454 century old plants showcasing Philippine biodiversity, as second-largest collection of herbarium.

=== Entomological Museum ===
The Entomological Museum is the largest entomological (insect) collection in the Philippines with close to half a million specimens of insects, acari and aranea.

The collection is composed of pinned, slide-mounted, and alcohol-preserved insects and arthropod specimens and continuously grows with the help of collection expeditions, biodiversity studies, and student submissions.

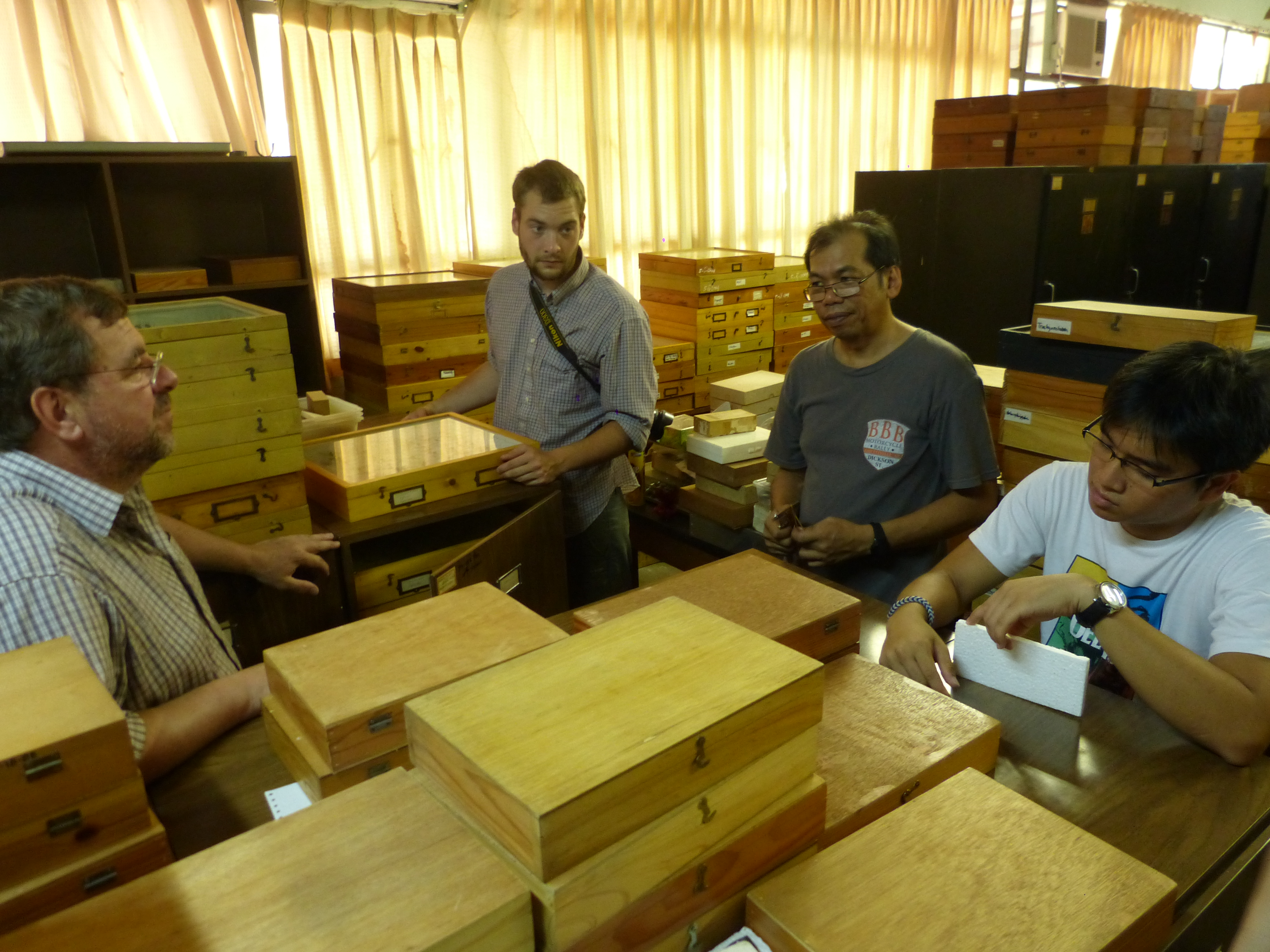
Foreign scientists visit the UPLB MNH Entomological Museum, one of the biggest reference collections in the Philippines.

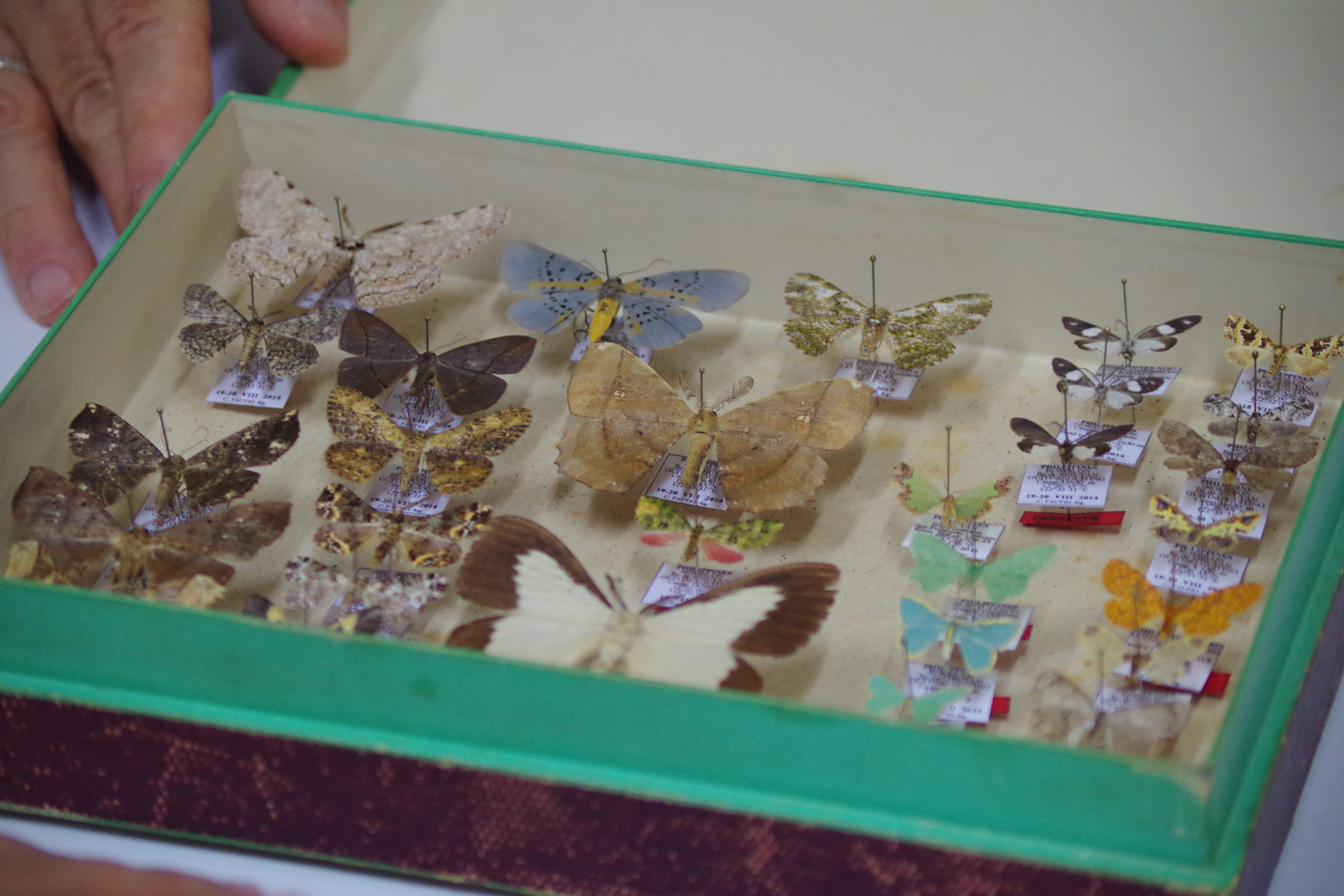
A collection of moths that needed to be identified and verified by the Museum's moth expert.

=== Forest Herbarium and Wood Collection ===
The Forestry Herbarium and Wood Collection, formally recognized as the LBC or Los Banos Collection in the Index Herbariorum has around 15,000 specimens of forest plants, including palms, and a modest wood collection. From 2001-2010, the LBC received 5 holotypes of new taxa of Philippine seed plants.

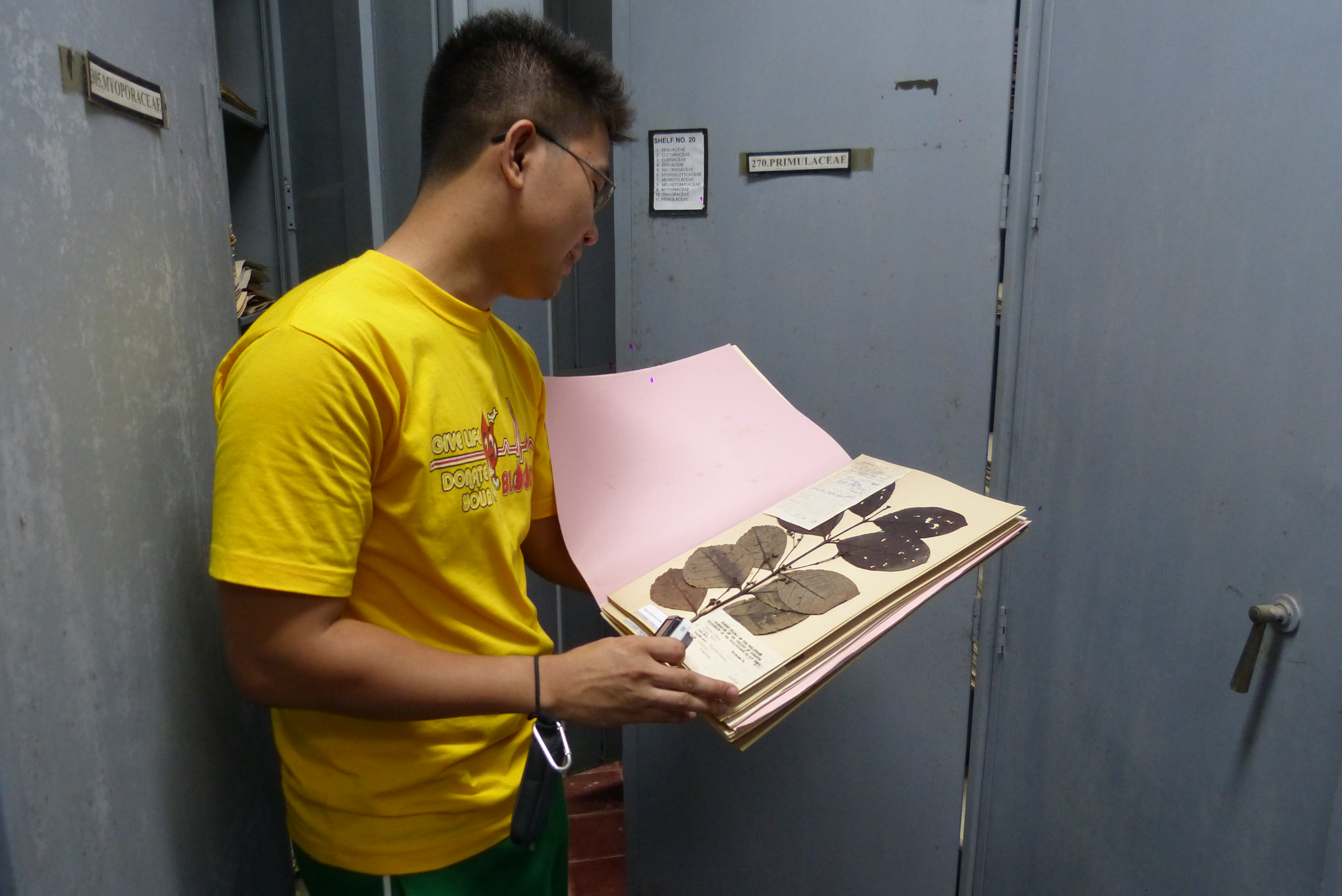
The Forestry Herbarium and Wood Collection of the UPLB Museum of Natural History mostly contains forest plants.

=== Mycological Herbarium ===
The Mycological Herbarium, with a fungal collection of around 13,000 specimens, traces its roots to the Dr. Gerardo O. Ocfemia (considered as the Father of Philippine Plant Pathology) Memorial Herbarium which was established in the 1960s from extensive fungal collections in the Philippines by iconoclast mycologist Dr. Don R. Reynolds and his students. The herbarium was formally recognized in 1966 and became included in the Index Herbariorum in 1968 as CALP (College of Agriculture, Laguna, Philippines).

Similar to the Entomological Museum, the collections of the Mycological Herbarium could have been bigger if not for the complete destruction of the Baker Fungus Collection during the Japanese and American invasions of World War II.

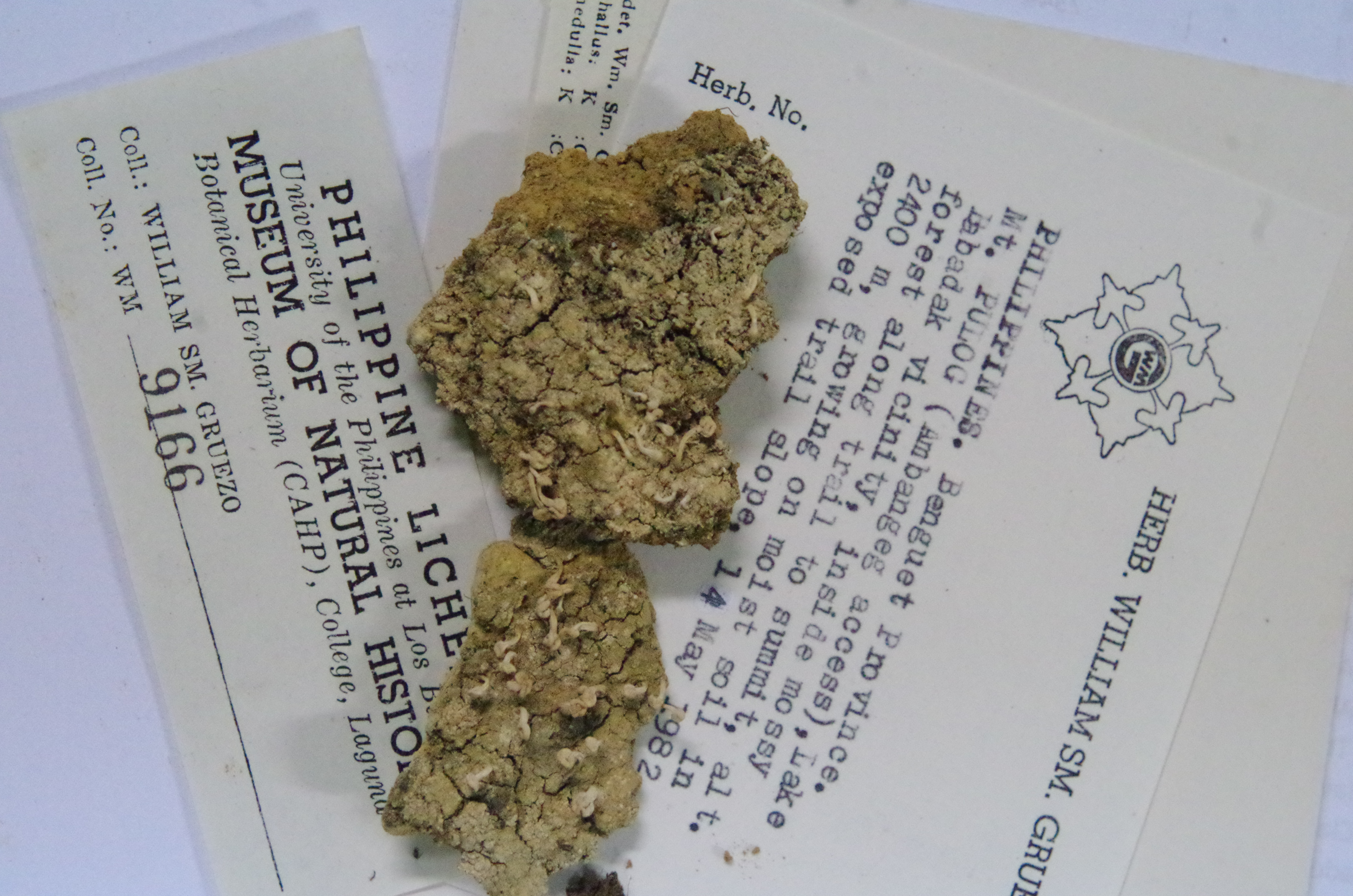
A specimen of lichen collected in 1982 by a curator of the UPLB Museum of Natural History Mycological Herbarium.

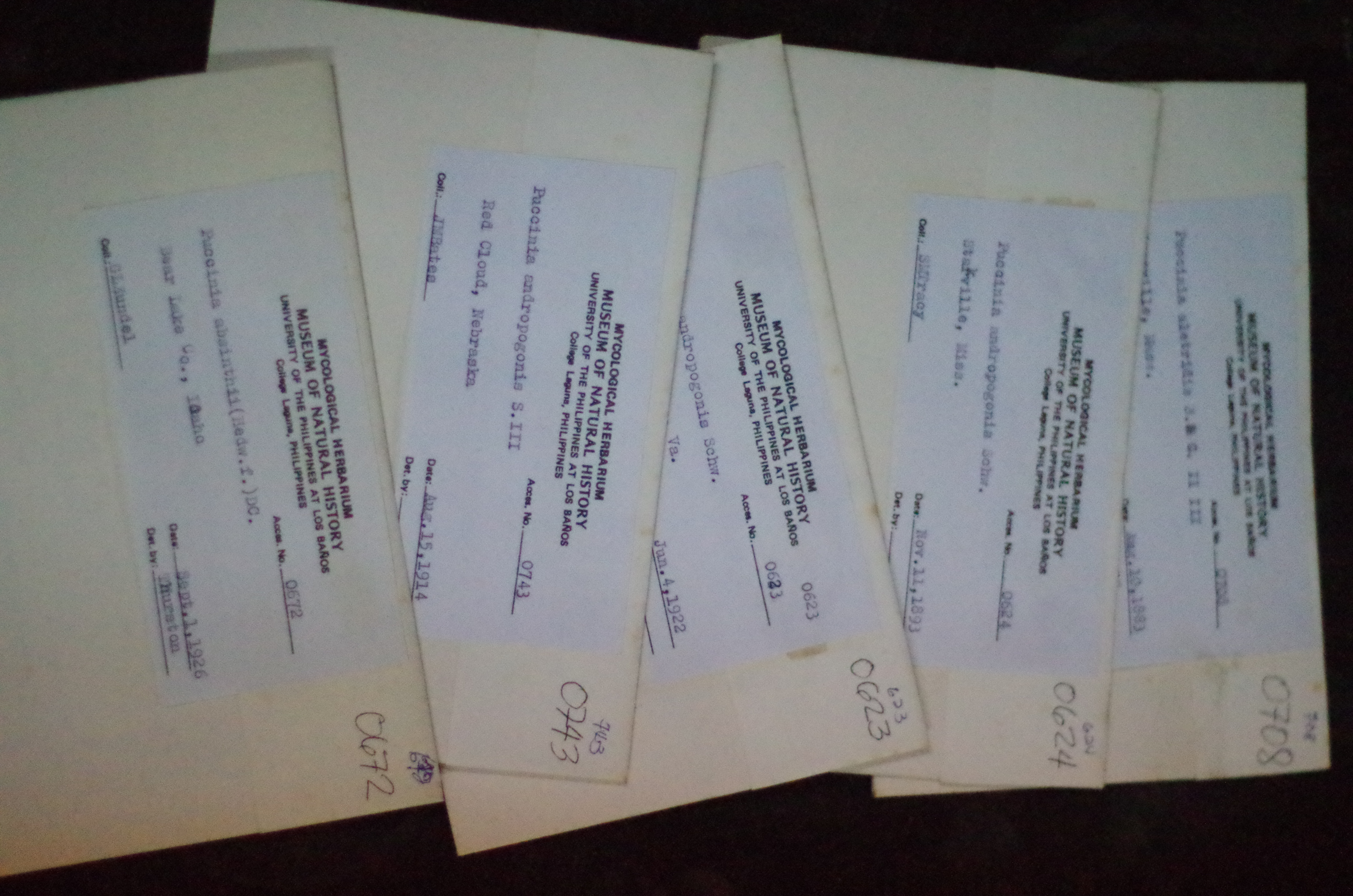
Some of the oldest specimens of the Mycological Herbarium of the UPLB Museum of Natural History.

=== Hortorium ===
The Hortorium is an in-situ collection of around 400 living plants, mostly of food, medicinal, tonic and ornamental value, and maintained and cared for in a small portion of land adjacent the Molawin River that traverses the UPLB campus. The Hortorium also serves as a laboratory area for some university courses focused on ecology, hydrology, and environmental science. Despite being a disturbed freshwater ecosystem, the Hortorium still harbors new and unique organisms such a minute cockroach, several species of predatory mites, and a "pirate" ant.

In 2015, the first ex-situ conservation project for native Philippine amphibians, Project Palaka, was established within the Hortorium and focused on amphibians from within Mt. Makiling forest preserve.

=== Microbial and Algal Culture Collections ===
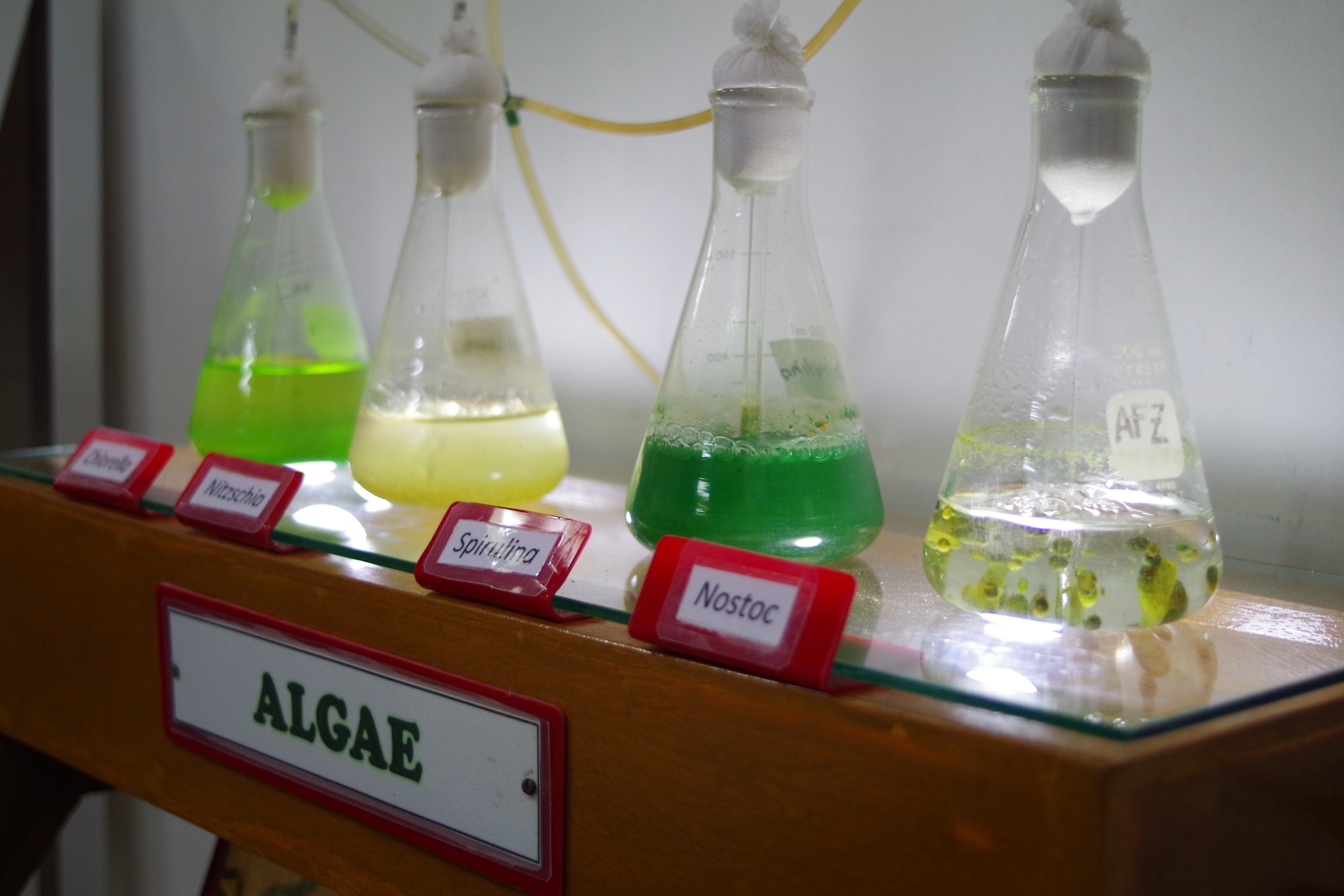
A simple set-up displaying freshwater algae at the UPLB Museum of Natural History exhibit area

The Microbial Culture Collection (MCC) of the museum is composed of more than 4,000 strains of bacteria, yeasts, mold species and other cultures. In 1984, it became the first Philippine microbial collection included (WDCM #39) in the World Federation for Culture Collections (WFCC). The most notable research contribution of the MCC in the biodiversity of Mt. Makiling is the discovery of Caldivirga maquilingensis in 1999 and Caldisphaera lagunensis in 2003 from Mudsprings (an acidic hot spring) in Mt. Makiling. The culture collection is currently an affiliate of the Philippine National Collection of Microorganisms and an active member of the Philippine Network of Microbial Culture Collections.

The Algal Culture Collection holds 86 strains.

=== Zoological and Wildlife Museum ===
The Zoological and Wildlife Museum consists of around 20,000 specimens of mollusks, fish, amphibians, reptiles, mammals and other wildlife, half of which is represented by the monumental collections of Dioscoro S. Rabor, the Father of Philippine Wildlife conservation. Dr. Rabor led more than 50 biodiversity field expeditions in his 20 years of research, collecting more than 60,000 specimens which was deposited in major Philippines museum and the US. More than 10,000 bird and 4,300 mammal specimens have been deposited at the UPLB Museum of Natural History which have become material for taxonomic and ecological studies, historical DNA sequencing, and phylogenetic analyses.

=== Integrated Biodiversity Exhibit ===
The Integrated Biodiversity Exhibit is a 1,500 square meter area of displays featuring collected specimens that have been prepared for public exhibition and appreciation. It features specimens distributed to several dioramas depicting marine, forest, and cave ecosystems.

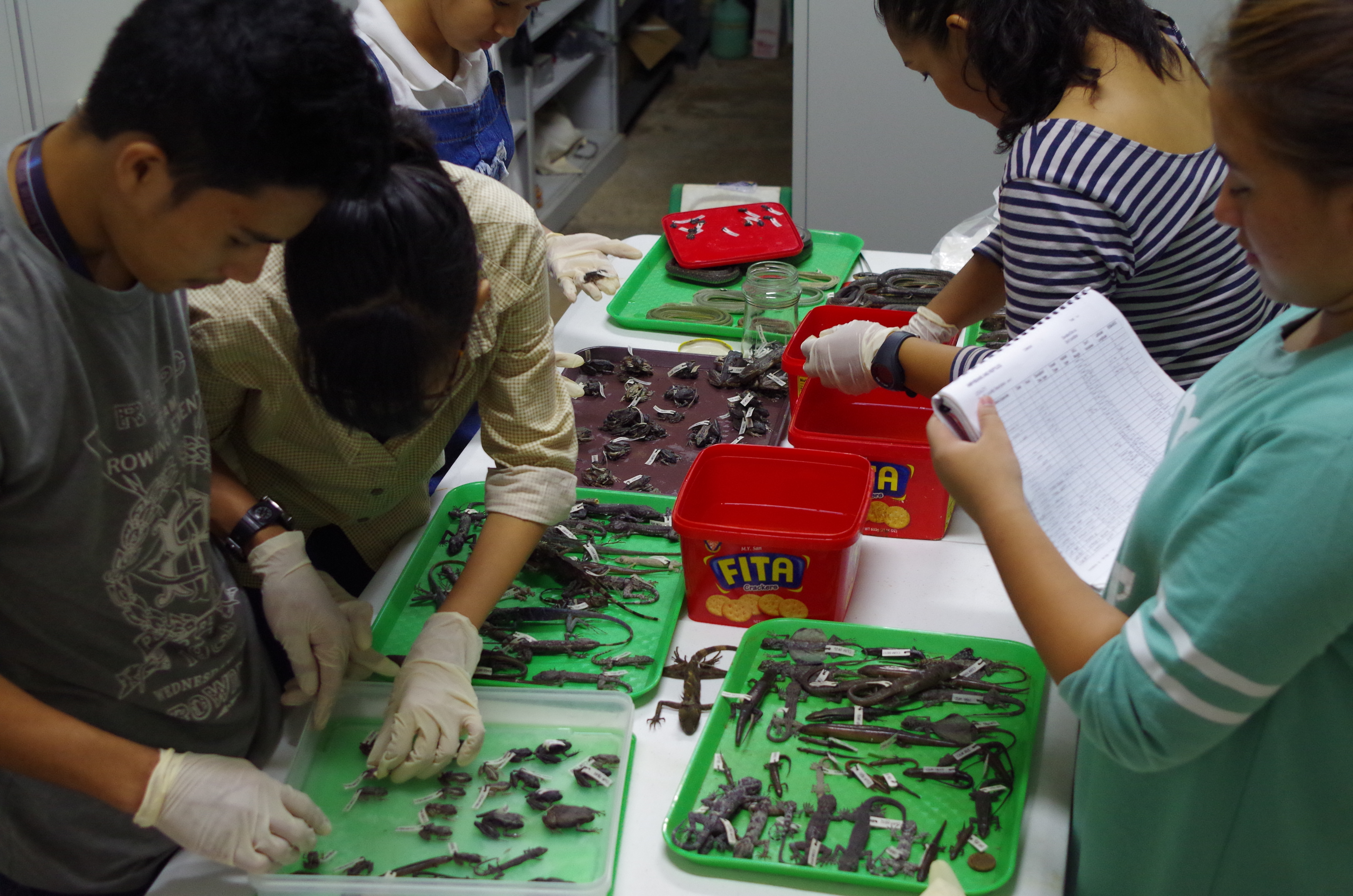
High-school students reviewing a herpetofauna collection at the UPLB Museum of Natural History.

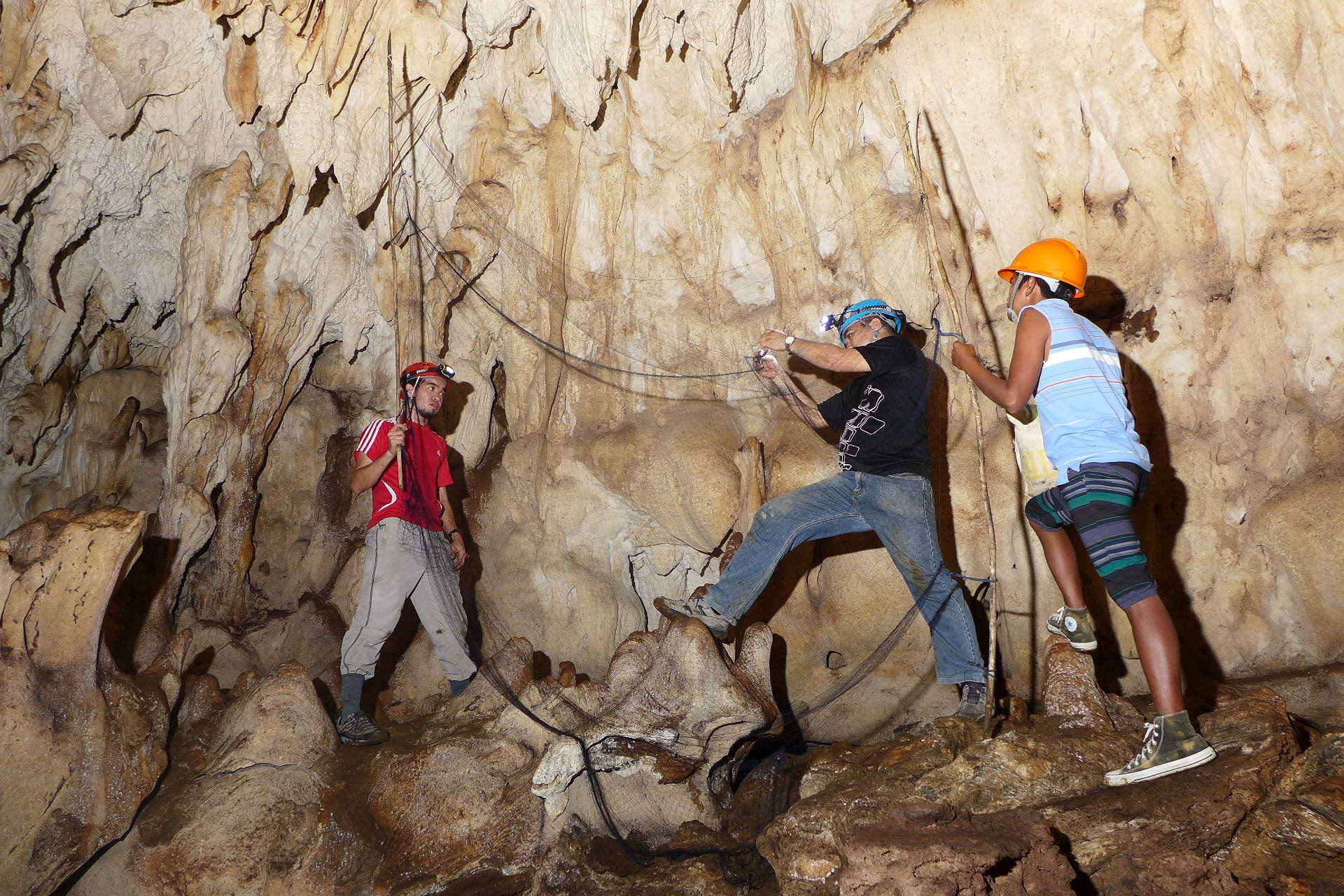
Museum researchers on fieldwork in Northern Luzon, Philippines to collect bats.

== New species discoveries ==
For a small organization, the museum is a productive research organization in terms of discoveries and new descriptions of species. Below are some species of organisms which have been directly described by curators and staff, or in which they were a significant part of, and/or those which have been named in honor of them.

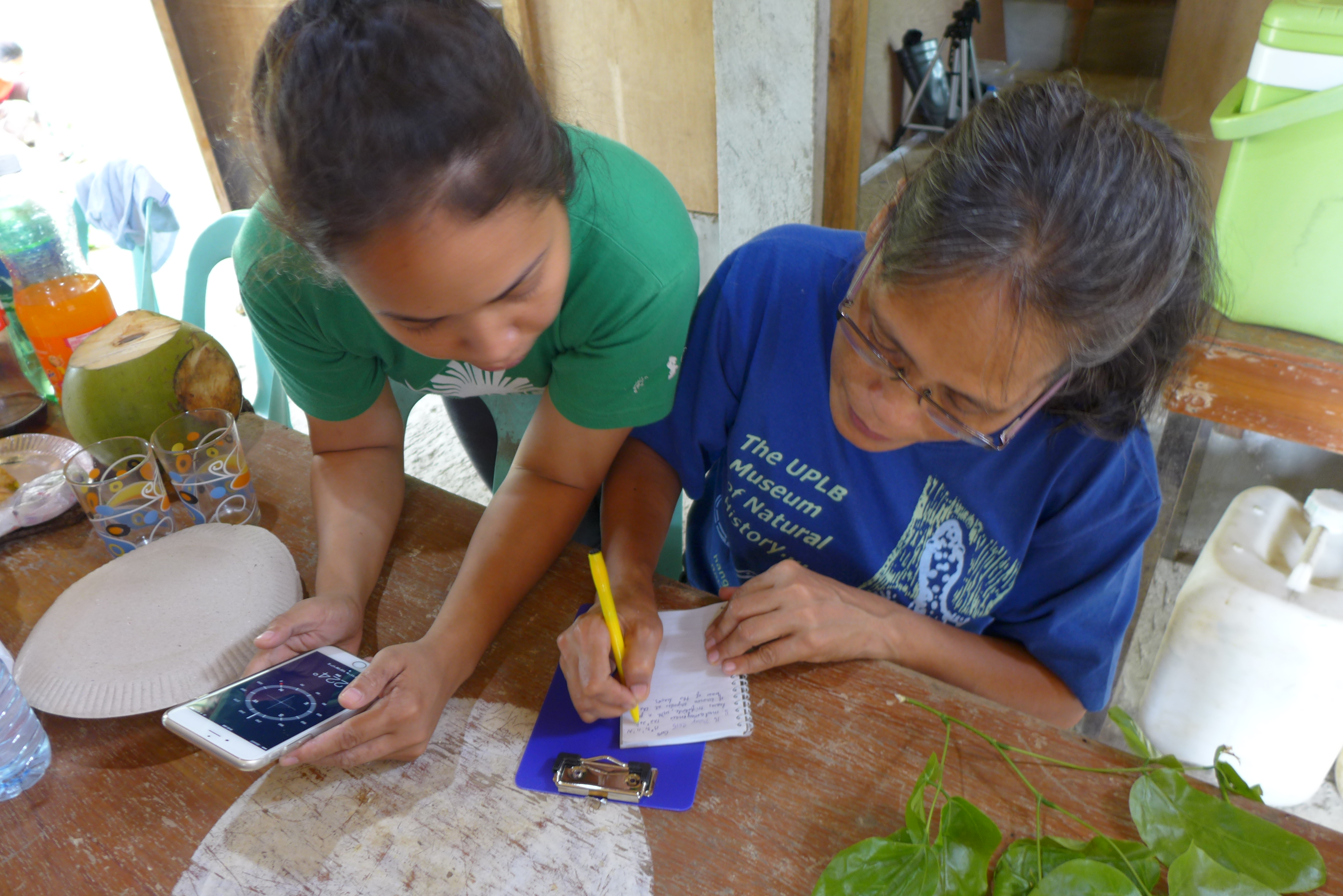
UPLB Museum of Natural History botanists conduct their preliminary descriptions of the eventual new jade vine, Strongylodon juangonzalezii.

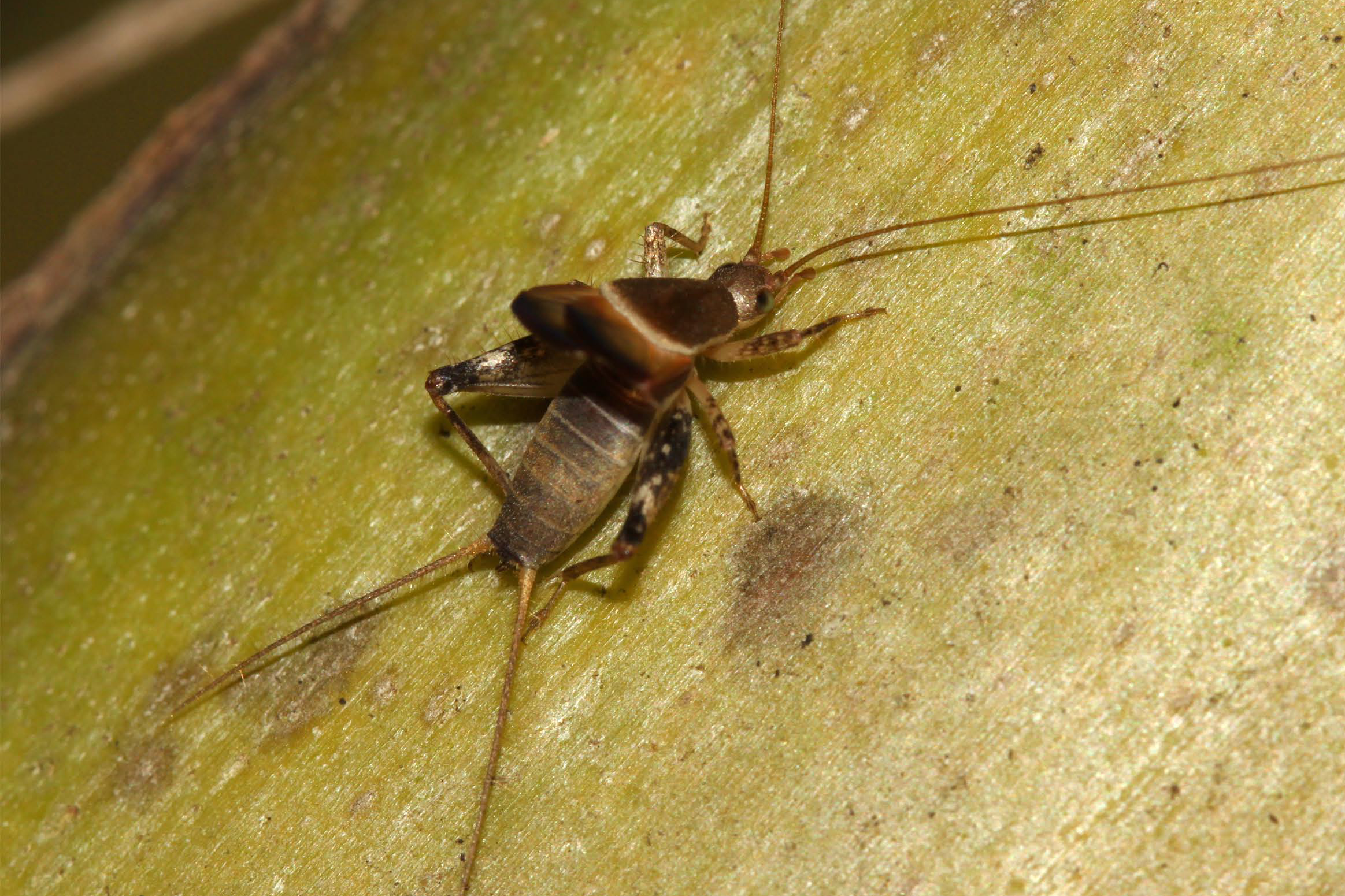
The live specimen of Ornebius alvarezi, named after the Museum's late field biologist James DV. Alvarez

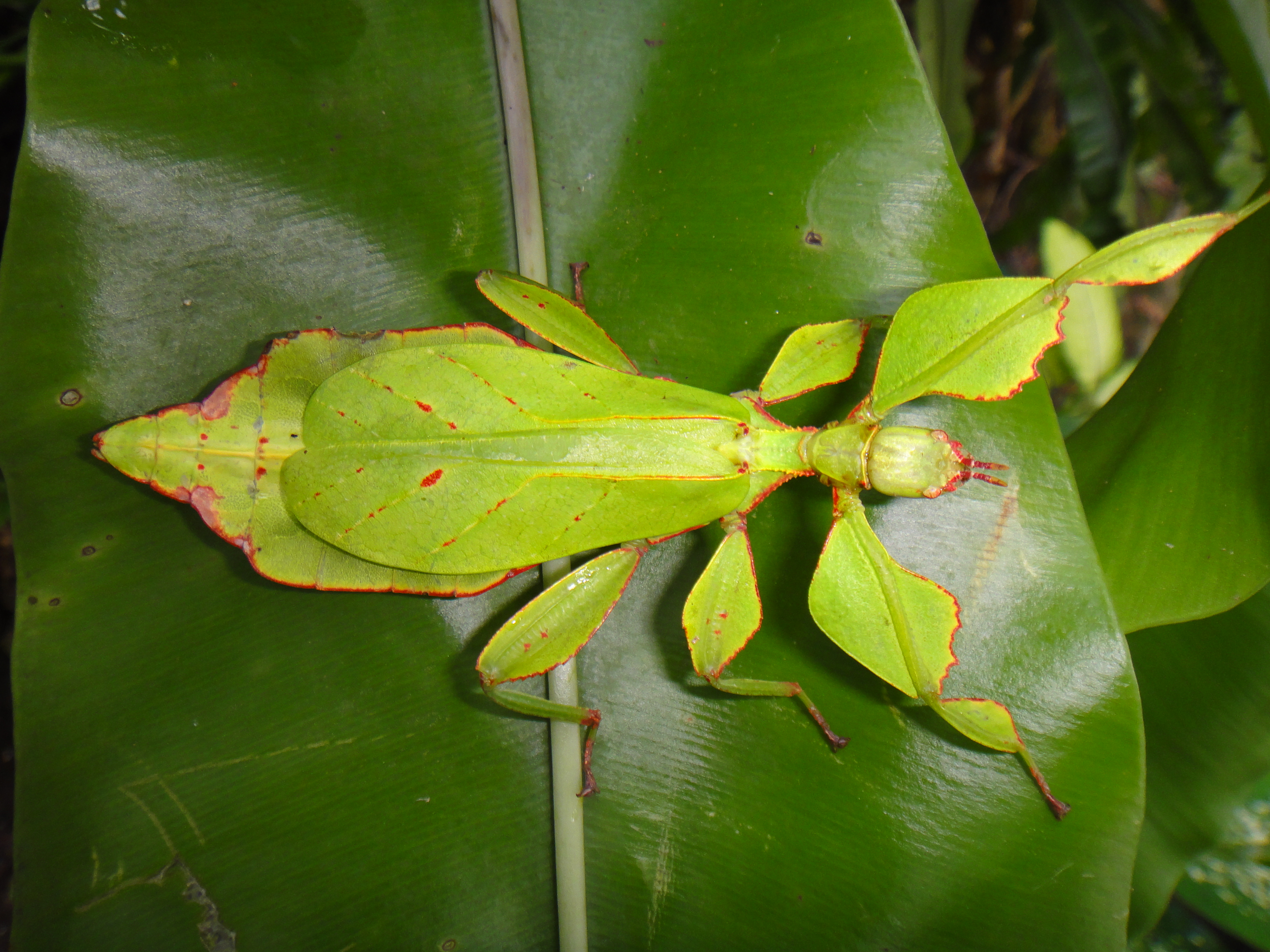
Live specimen of leaf insect Phyllium bonifacioi named by the museum's entomologists after Philippine revolution hero, Gat. Andres Bonifacio

Recent species discovered/co-discovered or described/co-described by UPLB MNH curators and staff, 2015 to present
Species	Description	Year
Mammals
Rhynchomys labo and Rhynchomys mingan	Shrew-like rats	2019
Herpetofauna		
Limnonectes beloncioi	Mindoro Fanged Frog	2021
Pseudogekko hungkag	Philippine False Gecko	2020
Arthropods
Alloscopus arborealis sp. nov	Tree crickets	2024
Xeniaria bicornis	Earwig	2024
Conchaspis angraeci Cockerell	Angraecum scale insect	2023
Dorylaea regina comb. nov	Cockroach	2023
Eubulides manobo sp. nov	Philippine stick insect	2023
Parajapyx giecuevasae sp. nov.	Two-pronged bristletail	2023
Nazgultaure gen. nov., Hobbitoblatta gen. nov., and Hobbitoblatta lambioae sp. nov	Cockroach	2023
Nocticola pheromosa sp. nov.	Cockroach	2023
Stenobrimus pilipinus	Philippine spiny stick insect	2023
Dactyloscirus sumatranus and Dactyloscirus ladangjagung	Cunaxid mites	2022
Flagellozetes (Cosmogalumna) sibuyanesis sp. nov.	Galumnid mites	2022
Flagellozetes (Cosmogalumna) naredoi sp. nov.	Galumnid mites	2022
Galumna (Neogalumna) eusebioi sp. nov.	Oribatid mite	2022
Trachyoribates insularis sp. nov.	Oribatid mite	2022
Pomacea concepcioni sp. nov.	Carpet moth	2022
Bundoksia sibuyania sp. nov.	Blattid cockroach	2021
Bundoksia rufocercata comb. nov.	Blattid cockroach	2021
Falcerminthus gen. nov., and Fadinthus gen. nov.	Lebinthini crickets	2021
Metapocyrtus (Artapocyrtus) gapudi	Pachyrhynchini weevil	2021
Metapocyrtus (Artapocyrtus) villalobosae	Pachyrhynchini weevil	2021
Pheidole aglae	Big-headed ants	2021
Metapocyrtus bronsi	Pachyrhynchini weevil	2020
Vombisidris freyae	Nocturnal arboreal ant	2020
Lebinthus baletei, L. boracay, L. hamus, L. magayon, L. palaceus and L. parvus	Eneopterinae cricket	2020
Rhicnogryllus paetensis	Sword-tailed cricket	2020
Mnesibulus laguna	Cricket	2020
Neophisis (Indophisis) montealegrei	Katytid	2020
Lepidemathis cavinti, L. dogmai, and L. lipa	Pluridentate jumping spider	2020
Chalybion clarebaltazarae and Chalybion stephenreyesi	Thread-waisted wasps	2020
Cladonotella spinulosa	Pygmy grasshopper	2019
Ornebius alvarezi and Ornebius bioculatus	Scaly crickets	2019
Paranisitra flavofacia	Mute cricket	2019
Endodrelanva siargaoensis	Bark cricket	2019
Trigonidium solis	Sword-tailed cricket	2019
Masteria urdujae	Miniature masteriine tarantula	2019
Myrmicaria buenaventei, M. chapmani, and M. transversa	Myrmicaria ants	2018
Tetheamyrma bidentata	Crematogastrine ant	2018
Anthracites furvuseques, Axylus mabinii, New variant in Axylus c.f. philippinus, Salomona lumadae	Spine-headed katydids	2018
Odontomachus ferminae	Odontomachus ant of the infandus species-group	2018
Aposthonia merdelynae	Webspinner	2018
Virgilia cocovora and Virgilia imuganensis	Fulgoroid plant-hoppers	2018
Albinospila variifrons, A. juancarlosi, Comostola stueningi, and C. romblonensis	Geometrid moths	2017
Neoribates isabelaensis	Sexually dimorphic oribatid species	2017
Pyrops polillensis group	Fulgoroid lanternfly	2017
Neobonzia ermilovi, Neoscirula klompeni, Neoscirula lagunaensis and Neoscirula lambatina	Predatory mites	2017
Eurhynchoribates (Orinchobates) samarensis and Eurhynchoribates (Eurhynchoribates) misamisensis	Oribatid mites	2017
Gapudipentax guiting	Latindiine cockroach	2017
Decoralampra fulgencioi and Cyrtonotula maquilingensis	Brachypterous cockroach	2017
Eurhynchoribates (Eurhynchoribates) nuevavizcayaensis and Suctobelbila trifasciata	Oribatid mites	2017
Malaconothrus pseudoadilatatus	Oribatid mite	2017
Pergalumna (Pergalumna) capualensis, Setogalumna minisetosa and Trichogalumna interlamellaris	Poronotic oribatid mites	2016
Anaplecta anncajanoae	First recorded subfamily and genus of cockroach in the Philippines	2016
Tagaloblatta kasaysayan	Ectobiid cockroach	2016
Ceropupa adams	Derbid planthoppers	2016
Lanceacheyla filipina	Cave-inhabiting predatory mite	2016
Harpegnathos honestoi and Harpegnathos alperti	Ponerine ants (4th and 5th worker-based ants)	2016
Romblonella longinoi	Myrmicine ants	2016
Nocticola gonzalezi	Cave troglobiont cockroach	2015
Lebinthus polillensis and Paranisitra septentria	Eneopterinae crickets	2015
Comperiella calauanica	Encyrtid endoparasitoid of coconut scale insect	2015
Lebinthus estrellae and Paranisitra leytensis	Eneopterinae crickets	2015
Mirogalumna leytensis and Pergalumna panayensis	Galumnid oribatid mites	2015
Dometorina sanpabloensis and Hydrozetes mindanaoensis	Oribatid mites	2015
Malaconothrus agusanensis	Oribatid mites	2015
Loxopsis waray	Cone-headed stick insect	2015
Aretridis buenaventei and Aretridis clousei	Ants	2015
Neoribates (Pseudoneoribates) kontschani and Neoribates (Pseudoneoribates) negrosensis	Oribatid mites (Parakalummidae)	2015
Romblonella coryae	Myrmicine ant	2015
Psithyristria ridibunda	"Laughing" cicada	2015
Phlogiellus kwebaburdeos	Mygalomorph spider	2015
Phyllium bonifacioi	Leaf insect	2015
Prolochus junlitjri and Chrysso makiling	Orb-weaver spider and Comb-footed spider	2015
Plants
Rafflesia banaoana	Southeast asian rafflesia	2023
Helicia danlagunzadii	Salimai	2023
Medinilla simplicymosa and M. ultramaficola	Medinilla	2020
Scaevola subalpina	Goodeniaceae	2020
Rafflesia consueloae	Endophytic and holoparasitic plant	2016
Strongylodon juangonzalezii	Plagiotropic dense racemose inflorescences (Liana)	2015
Hoya lambioae	Epiphytic wax plant (Hoyas)	2015
Hoya litii	Epiphytic wax plant (Hoyas)	2015
Hoya leticiae	Epiphytic wax plant (Hoyas)	2015
Hoya edwinofernandoi	Epiphytic wax plant (Hoyas)	2015
Hoya williamoliveriana	Epiphytic wax plant (Hoyas)	2015
Sarcostemma malampayae	Perennial flowering shrub with trailing vines and lianas	2015
Hoya marananiae	Epiphytic wax plant (Hoyas)	2015
Hoya espaldoniana	Epiphytic wax plant (Hoyas)	2015

More species listed in UPLB Museum of Natural History website.

== Public service activities ==
As a public service institution dedicated to biodiversity conservation education, the museum regularly holds exhibits, special tours, seminars, training programs, and provide technical assistance to local government units, other organizations and communities.

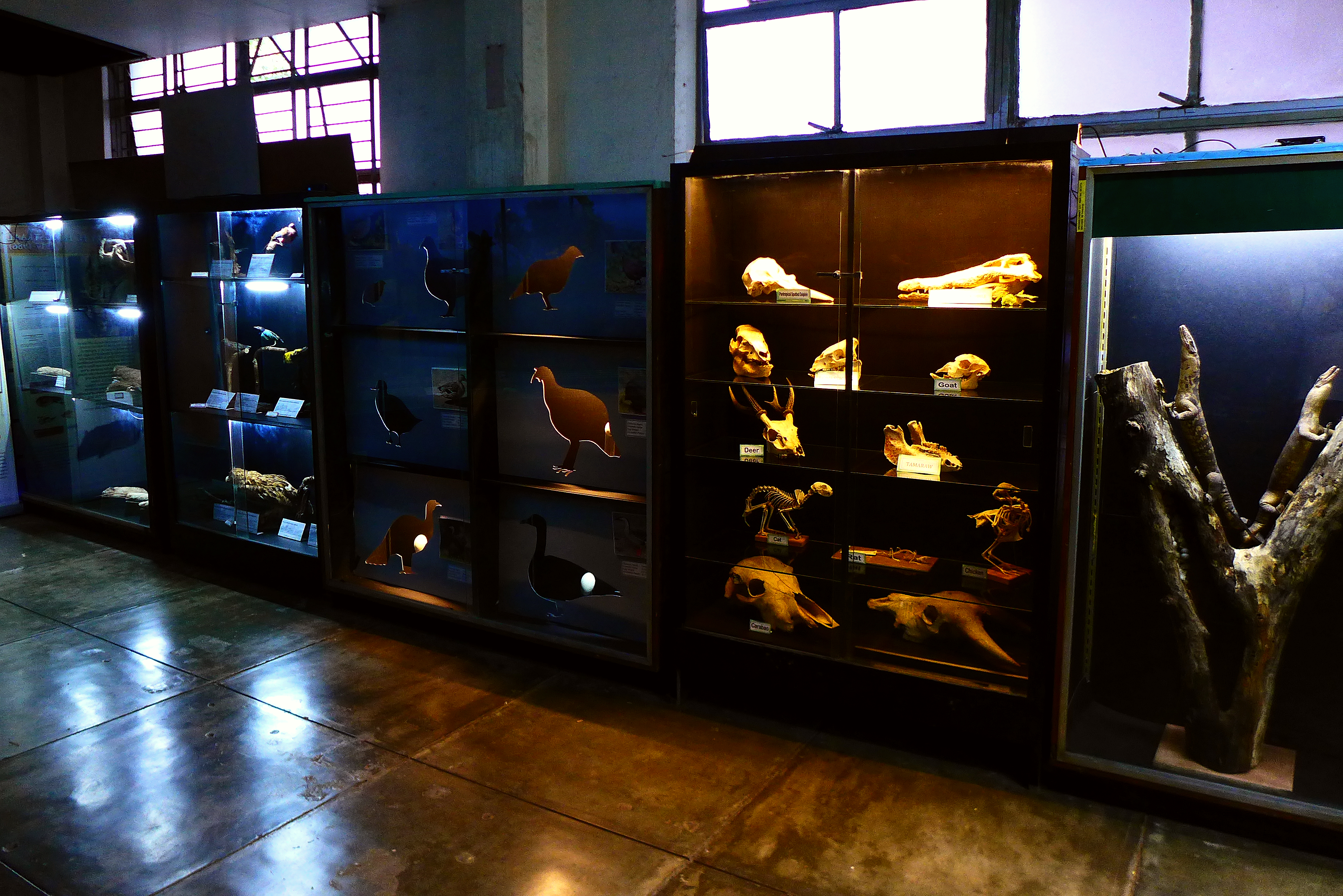
Display of specimens of birds, mammals, reptiles in one area of the Museum exhibit halls

For scientists and researchers, the museum is able to provide services such as scientific name verification, biological specimen identification, and provision of microbial cultures.

The museum publishes its own peer-reviewed journal, Laksambuhay: The UPLB Journal of Natural History.

Aside from hosting its own scientific gathering, i.e. CLADES 2017, to gather stakeholders of the Philippine natural history collections system and enhance the overall appreciation of natural history collections for increased networking and collaboration, the Museum also collaborates with other scientific organizations and societies in the holding of meetings and conferences, e.g. 25th SEAZA Conference (2018) and the 11th ANRRC International Meeting Philippines (2019) which highlighted the roles of biological resource centers, that includes museums, in the conservation, preservation, and utilization of animal, plant and microbial resources.

== Organization and administration ==
The museum is headed by a director which is appointed by the UPLB Chancellor for a term of three (3 years), renewable for at least two (2) terms. The director is selected by the Chancellor traditionally from the set of eligible faculty nominees. Coordinators of major functions (Research, Extension, Collections Management, Linkages and Academic Programs) assist the director in administering improvements and execution of the mandates and functions of the Museum.

Museum Directors, 1976 to the present
Name	Tenure of Office
Dr. Marian P. De Leon	March 15, 2021 to present
Dr. Juan Carlos T. Gonzalez	February 16, 2015 – March 14, 2021
Dr. Ireneo L. Lit, Jr.	March 1, 2006 – February 15, 2015
Dr. Stephen G. Reyes	February 16, 2006 – February 28, 2006
Dr. Lourdes B. Cardenas	October 15, 2001 – February 15, 2006
Dr. Augusto C. Sumalde	May 1, 1995 – October 14, 2001
Dr. William SM. Gruezo	May 1, 1992 – April 30, 1995
Dr. Venus Christina J. Calilung	September 1, 1985 – April 30, 1992
Dr. Edwino S. Fernando	April 1 - December 31, 1983 in acting capacity
Dr. Victor P. Gapud	April 25, 1982 – August 31, 1985
Dr. Irineo J. Dogma, Jr.	April 25, 1980 – April 24, 1982
Prof. Juan V. Pancho	September 30, 1976 – April 24, 1980

== Museum curators ==
There are 29 UPLB regular faculty, Professors Emeriti and researchers recently appointed by the UPLB Chancellor to serve as Museum Curators based on their field of expertise. The museum curator's specialization and projects in their own respected academic and research field hold significant contributions to the raising worldwide status and recognition of the museum.

At present, there are four (4) curators for the Botanical Herbarium and Hortorium, seven (7) for the Entomological Museum curators, three (3) for the Microbial and Algal Culture Collections, three (3) for the Forestry Herbarium and Wood collection, two (2) for the Mycological Herbarium, 10 for the Zoological and Wildlife Collections and one curator for the Special Collections.

Museum Curators for appointment from January 1 to December 31, 2023
Name	Education	Position	Curator For	Unit	College
Botanical Herbarium and Hortorium
Annalee S. Hadsall	MS Botany	Assistant Professor 7	Orchids and epiphytes	Institute of Biological Sciences	College of Arts and Sciences
Ivy Amor F. Lambio	Ph.D. in Botany	Assistant Professor 5	Mosses	Institute of Biological Sciences	College of Arts and Sciences
Zhereeleen M. Adorador	MS Forestry	Assistant Professor 7	Orchids	Institute of Biological Sciences	College of Arts and Sciences
Jiro T. Adorador	MS Forestry	Assistant Professor 3	Forest palms	Institute of Biological Sciences	College of Arts and Sciences
Entomological Museum
Jessamyn D. Recuenco-Adorada	Ph.D. in Entomology (Insect Systematics)	Assistant Professor 7	Coccinellidae, lady beetles	Institute of Weed Science, Entomology and Plant Pathology	College of Agriculture and Food Science
Venus J. Calilung	Ph.D. in Systematic Entomology	Professor Emeritus	Aphids	Institute of Weed Science, Entomology and Plant Pathology	College of Agriculture and Food Science
Aimee Lynn A. Barrion-Dupo	Ph.D. in Entomology	Professor 12	Moths and spiders	Institute of Biological Sciences	College of Arts and Sciences
Ireneo L. Lit, Jr.	Ph.D. by Research in Systematic Entomology	Professor 8	Mealy bugs and scale insects (Coccoidea) and other terrestrial arthropods	Institute of Biological Sciences	College of Arts and Sciences
Leonila A. Corpuz-Raros	Ph.D. in Entomology	Professor Emeritus	Acari, mites, soil arthropods	Institute of Weed Science, Entomology and Plant Pathology	College of Agriculture and Food Science
Sheryl A. Yap	Ph.D. in Forestry (Forest Entomology)	Assistant Professor 6	Weevils and hoppers	Institute of Weed Science, Entomology and Plant Pathology	College of Agriculture and Food Science
Juancho B. Balatibat	MS Entomology	Assistant Professor 6	Forest insects	Department of Forest Biological Sciences	College of Forestry and Natural Resources
Marnelli S. Alviola	MS Forestry	University Research Associate I - EBD	Collembola	Institute of Biological Sciences	College of Arts and Sciences
Jade Aster T. Badon	PhD Entomology and Nematology	Assistant Professor 6	Butterfly	Institute of Biological Sciences	College of Arts and Sciences
Microbial and Algal Culture Collections
Marian De Leon	Ph.D. in Engineering (Material and Life Science)	University Researcher I	Cave microbes	UPLB Museum of Natural History	Office of the Vice-Chancellor for Research and Extension
Milagrosa R. Martinez-Goss	Ph.D. in Botany (Phycology)	Professor Emeritus	Algae and diatoms	Institute of Biological Sciences	College of Arts and Sciences
Noel Sabino	Ph.D. in Environmental Science	Assistant Professor 7	Bacteria, yeast and molds	Institute of Biological Sciences	College of Arts and Sciences
Forestry Herbarium and Wood Collections
Pastor L. Malabrigo, Jr.	MS Forestry	Associate Professor 7	Trees	Department of Forest Biological Sciences	College of Forestry and Natural Resources
Rosalie C. Mendoza	PhD in Forestry	Associate Professor 5	Wood and forest by-products	Department of Forest Products and Paper Science	College of Forestry and Natural Resources|-
Manuel L. Castillo	Ph.D. in Forestry (Forest Taxonomy-Floristics)	Professor 4	Native forest trees	Department of Forest Biological Sciences	College of Forestry and Natural Resources
Mycological Herbarium
Jennifer M. Niem	Ph.D. in Plant Pathology	University Researcher I	Fungi	UPLB Museum of Natural History/Institute of Weed Science, Entomology and Plant Pathology	College of Forestry and Natural Resources
Julie Aiza L. Mandap	MS in Plant Pathology	Assistant Professor	Fungi	Institute of Weed Science, Entomology and Plant Pathology	College of Forestry and Natural Resources
Zoological and Wildlife Collections
Leticia Afuang	Ph.D. in Environmental Science	Professor 2	Amphibians and reptiles	Institute of Biological Sciences	College of Arts and Sciences
Phillip A. Alviola	MS Wildlife Studies	Associate Professor 2	Small mammals and other wildlife	Institute of Biological Sciences	College of Arts and Sciences
Ma. Vivian DC. Camacho	Ph.D. in Marine Science	Assistant Professor 6	Freshwater and marine fishes	Institute of Biological Sciences	College of Arts and Sciences
Emmanuel Ryan C. de Chavez	Ph.D. in Life Sciences	Assistant Professor 5	Mollusks	Institute of Biological Sciences	College of Arts and Sciences
Anna Pauline O. de Guia	Ph.D. in Environmental Resources	Professor 2	Small mammals	Institute of Biological Sciences	College of Arts and Sciences
Juan Carlos T. Gonzalez	DPhil Zoology	Professor 4	Birds	Institute of Biological Sciences	College of Arts and Sciences
Victor S. Ticzon	Ph.D. in Marine Science	Associate Professor 1	Corals, fish	Institute of Biological Sciences	College of Arts and Sciences
Andres Tomas L. Dans	MS Zoology	Assistant Professor 3	Mammals	Department of Forest Biological Sciences	College of Forestry and Natural Resources
Joseph S. Masangkay	Doctor of Agriculture	Professor Emeritus	Wildlife diseases	Department of Veterinary Paraclinical Sciences	College of Arts and Sciences
Wilfredo Y. Licuanan	PhD in Biology	Professor	Corals	Biology Department	De La Salle University
Special Collections
Decibel V. Faustino-Eslava	Ph.D. in Geology	Associate Professor 6	Special collections, geology	School of Environmental Science and Management	School of Environmental Science and Management

== Outstanding achievements ==
The UPLB Museum of Natural History is a multi-awarded organization with well-recognized staff and curators. Its most active personnel and experts not only contribute to the expansion of the collections but also lend credence to the experience and capability of the museum in terms of natural history research and studies; taxonomy and systematics; biodiversity conservation and education.

Recognition received by the UPLB Museum of Natural History since 2011
Name		Award	Year
Dr. Ireneo L. Lit, Jr	Curator	Pest Management Council of the Philippines, Inc. Award for Instruction	2024
Cristian C. Lucañas	Curator	Philippine Association of Entomologists, Inc. Stephen G. Reyes Memorial Award for Systematics	2024
Dr. Aimee Lynn B. Dupo	Curator	Pest Management Council of the Philippines Outstanding Entomologist for Instruction	2023
Dr. Juan Carlos T. Gonzalez	Curator	UPAA Distinguished Alumni Award in Science and Technology	2023
Dr. Milagros R. Martinez-Goss	Curator	UPAA Distinguished Alumni Award in Science and Technology	2023
Asst. Prof. Zhereeleen M. Adorador	Curator	UP Professorial Chair Award for Outstanding Teaching and Research	2023
Dr. Noel G. Sabino	Curator	UP Professorial Chair Award for Outstanding Teaching and Research	2023
Dr. Victor S. Ticzon	Curator	UP Professorial Chair Award for Outstanding Teaching and Research	2023
Assoc. Prof. Annalee S. Hadsall	Curator	UP Professorial Chair Award for Outstanding Research and Public Service	2023
Dr. Ireneo L. Lit, Jr.	Curator	UPLB Outstanding Teacher Award in the Biological Sciences	2020
Dr. David Emmanuel M. General	REPS	UPLB Outstanding Researcher Award (Junior/Biological Sciences category)	2020
Dr. Decibel V. Faustino-Eslava	Curator	NRCP Achievement Award	2020
Dr. Aimee Lynn B. Dupo	Curator	Outstanding ASEAN Science Diplomat	2020
Dr. Juan Carlos T. Gonzalez	Director, curator	UPLB Outstanding Alumni for Biodiversity Conservation Education of Philippine Wildlife	2019
Dr. Ma. Vivian DC. Camacho	Curator	Philippine Agriculture and Resource Research Foundation, Inc. Research & Development Award	2018
Prof. Phillip A. Alviola	Curator	Asian Scientist 100 laureate	2018
Dr. Aimee Lynn B. Dupo	Curator	Faces of a Teacher Award	2017
James DV. Alvarez	REPS	UPLB Outstanding Researcher Award (Junior/Biological Sciences category)	2017
Florante A. Cruz	REPS	UPLB Outstanding Extension Personnel Award	2016
Dr. Aimee Lynn B. Dupo	Curator	National Academy of Science and Technology Philippines Outstanding Young Scientist Award	2015
Dr. Sheryl A. Yap	Curator	UPLB Outstanding Junior Researcher Award (Faculty/Natural Sciences category)	2015
Dr. Ivy Amor F. Lambio	Curator	UPLB Outstanding Teacher Award (Senior Faculty/Biological Sciences category)	2015
Mario M. Navasero	Curator	UPLB Outstanding Senior Researcher (REPS/Natural Sciences category)	2015
Eduardo G. Eres	Administrative Staff	UPLB Outstanding Administrative Personnel Award	2015
Ariel R. Larona	Administrative Staff	Civil Service Commission Pag-asa Award	2014
Ariel R. Larona	Administrative Staff	UPLB Outstanding Administrative Personnel Award	2014
Dr. William SM. Gruezo	Curator	UP Alumni Association Distinguished Alumni Award for in Environmental Conservation and Sustainable Development	2014
Dr. Aimee Lynn B. Dupo	Curator	UPLB Outstanding Junior Scientist Award	2013
Dr. Ireneo L. Lit, Jr.	Curator	UPLB Outstanding Senior Scientist Award	2013
Edison A. Cosico	Administrative Staff	UPLB Outstanding Administrative Personnel Award	2013
Dr. Leticia A. Afuang	Curator	UPLB Outstanding Extensionist Award	2012
Rafael D. Tandang	Administrative Staff	UPLB Outstanding Administrative Personnel Award	2012
UPLB Museum of Natural History	All curators and staff	UPLB Outstanding Extension Program Award	2011
Dr. Juan Carlos T. Gonzalez	Curator	National Academy of Science and Technology Philippines Outstanding Young Scientist Award	2011
