= Afuang =

Afuang is a surname. Notable people with the surname include:

- Abner Afuang (born 1944), Filipino politician and police officer
- Leticia E. Afuang, Filipina biologist and wildlife conservationist
