= Adelina Barrion =

Filipino entomologist and geneticist

Adelina Adato Barrion
- Born: September 9, 1951
- Died: July 10, 2010 (aged 58)

Academic background
- Education: UPLB College of Agriculture

Academic work
- Discipline: Entomologist; Geneticist
- Institutions: UPLB College of Arts and Sciences; UPLB Museum of Natural History
- Main interests: Philippine spiders

Adelina Adato Barrion (September 9, 1951 – July 10, 2010) was a Filipino entomologist and geneticist whose extensive contribution to the study of Philippine spiders earned her the moniker "Asia's Spider Woman," although she also contributed significantly to the study of other species, and to the study of genetics in general.

She also headed the Genetics and Molecular Biology Division of the Institute of Biological Sciences, at the University of the Philippines Los Baños' College of Arts and Sciences, and served as the curator of the UPLB Museum of Natural History.

== Education ==
Barrion graduated from her bachelor's degree in Entomology at the UPLB College of Agriculture in 1974, and earned her Master's and Doctorate degrees in Genetics (Entomology) in 1978 and 1985, respectively.

== Awards ==
Honors awarded to Barrion over the years include:

- Uichanco Award for Outstanding Entomologist (Philippine Association of Entomologists) - May 23, 1997
- NAST Outstanding Research Paper (Department of Science and Technology - National Academy of Science and Technology, DOST-NAST) - July 17, 1996
- Outstanding Teacher in Biological Sciences (University of the Philippines) - March 3, 1994
- CAS Outstanding Alumnus (UPLB Alumni Association) - 1992
- Outstanding Model Lady Educator and Public Servant of the Year (Media Exponent of the Philippine Unity and Progress, Inc.) - November 15, 1992
- SEARCA Professional Chair Holder in Genetics (Southeast Asian Ministers of Education Organization-Southeast Asian Regional Center for Graduate Study and Research in Agriculture)- January 1990 – December 1991
- Outstanding Young Scientist Award (NAST-DOST) -July 11, 1990
- Outstanding Biologist (Philobioscientia) - February 22, 1990
- Best Paper Award in Entomology (Pest Control Council of the Philippines) - May 12, 1989
- Outstanding Researcher (UPLB College of Arts and Sciences) - November 23, 1988
- Outstanding Researcher (UPLB Institute of Biological Sciences) - November 13, 1988
- Golden Leadership Award (Humanitarian Center of the Philippines) - December 13, 1987
- Luisito Cuy Memorial Award (Luisito S. Cuy Foundation) - 1987
- Kalayaan Award (International Public Assistance Civic Organization) - 1987
- Best Paper Award, Entomology (Pest Control Council of the Philippines) - 1985
- IRRI Fellowship (International Rice Research Institute) - 1981–1985
- IPB Fellowship (UPLB College of Agriculture) - 1969–1978
- UP Undergraduate Fellowship (University of the Philippines Los Banos) - 1969–1974
