= University of the Philippines Los Baños College of Arts and Sciences =

Coordinates: 14°09′56.50″N 121°14′28.27″E

College of Arts and Sciences at University of the Philippines Los Baños
- "Kolehiyo ng mga Agham at mga Sining sa Unibersidad ng Pilipinas Los Baños"
- Type: State, Non-sectarian
- Established: December 21, 1972 (53 years and 316 days)
- Dean: Chrysline Margus N. Piñol, PhD
- Location: Los Baños, Laguna, Philippines
- Hymn: "Sulong C.A.S." ("Onward, C.A.S.")
- Newspaper: CAS Accents
- Website: cas.uplb.edu.ph

The College of Arts and Sciences (CAS) is one of the eleven degree-granting units of the University of the Philippines Los Baños. It is the largest college in University of the Philippines System which offers most of the general education subjects required of UPLB students, as well as the highest number of degree programs in the University. The Philippines' Commission on Higher Education has recognized CAS as a Center of Excellence in Biology, Chemistry, Information Technology and Mathematics, as well as a Center of Development in Physics and Statistics.

== History ==
The Dean Edelwina C. Legaspi Hall (formerly the Humanities Building), behind the Oblation. It houses the administration offices and classrooms of CAS.

The College of Science and Humanities was founded in 1972. The Board appointed Edelwina C. Legaspi as the first dean of the new college, and a month later, Dolores A. Ramirez as secretary.

The College's first seven departments were Humanities, Chemistry, Mathematics, Statistics and Physics, Botany, Zoology, Life Sciences and Social Sciences

It was renamed College of Arts and Sciences in 1977.

== Institutes/Departments ==
There are six institutes in CAS:

- Institute of Biological Sciences (IBS) – Established on March 23, 1983, it offers a Bachelor of Science degree in Biology with specializations in cell and molecular biology, ecology, genetics, microbiology, plant biology, systematics, wildlife biology, and zoology. It also offers 12 graduate degrees: six master's degree, three doctor of philosophy, and three doctor of philosophy by research. Students are admitted to the institute through the University of the Philippines College Admission Test. The institute is composed of five divisions namely on animal biology, environmental biology, genetics and molecular biology, microbiology, and plant biology. In 2014, the undergraduate degree program in Biology of the institute received its certification and accreditation under the ASEAN University Network-Quality Assurance System. Researchers from the institute discovered new species of spiders from Mount Makiling. Other facilities that support the institute are the Limnological Station, UPLB Museum of National History, University of the Philippines Open University, National Institute of Molecular Biology and Biotechnology, National Crop Protection Center, Institute of Plant Breeding, and International Rice Research Institute.
- Institute of Chemistry (IC)
- Institute of Computer Science (ICS)
- Institute of Mathematical Sciences (IMS)
- Institute of Physics (IoP)
- Institute of Statistics (IS)

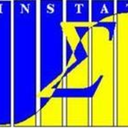
Institute of Statistics, an institute under UPLB CAS

- Department of Humanities (DH)
- Department of Social Sciences (DSS)
- Department of Human Kinetics (DHK)
- UP Rural High School (UPRHS)

== Undergraduate Degree Programs ==
Degree Program	Major Fields / Specializations	Duration
BS Agricultural Chemistry (joint program with the College of Agriculture and Food Science)	Specializations: Food Science; Animal Science; Soil Science; Crop Protection (Entomology/Plant Pathology/Weed Science); Plant Physiology; Agricultural Biotechnology	5 years
BA Communication Arts	Speech Communication; Writing; Theater Arts	4 years
BA Philosophy	Students should take specialization courses from disciplines other than philosophy.	4 years
BA Sociology	No specialization, but students must select electives under one social science discipline: Anthropology, History, Political Science, and Psychology.	4 years
BS Applied Mathematics	Majors: Actuarial Science, Operations Research, Biomathematics	4 years
BS Applied Physics	Specializations: Instrumentation Physics; Experimental Physics; Computational Physics	4 years
BS Biology	Major fields: Cell and Molecular Biology; Ecology; Genetics; Microbiology; Plant Biology; Systematics; Wildlife Biology; Zoology	4 years
BS Chemistry	(single track)	4 years
BS Computer Science	(single track)	4 years
BS Mathematics	(single track)	4 years
BS Mathematics and Science Teaching	Major fields: Physics, Chemistry, Biology, Mathematics	4 years
BS Statistics	(single track)	4 years
B Sports Science		4 years
AA Sports Studies	(single track)	2 years

== Organizations ==
The college is host to a number of student organizations.

- The UPLB Actuarial Science Society (UPLB ActSS)
- The U.P. Alliance of Students Unified for Sociology (UP ASUS)
- The UPLB Astrum Scientis Sorority
- The UP Cell Biological Society (UP CELLS)
- The UPLB Chemical Kinetics Society (UPLB CHEMO)
- The UPLB Chemical Society (UPLB CHEMSOC)
- The UPLB Computer Science Society, (UPLB COSS)
- The UP League of Agricultural Chemistry Students (UP LACS)
- The UPLB Mathematical Sciences Society (UPLB MASS)
- The UPLB Microbiological Society (UPLB MICROSOC)
- The UP SOCIUS
- The UPLB Statistical Society (UPLB STATS)
- The UPLB Sociology Society (UPLB SocioSoc)

== Notable Faculty and Alumni ==
- Arlene Arcillas (BA Biology) – Mayor of Santa Rosa, Laguna.
- Ariella Arida (BS Chemistry) – Miss Universe 2013 3rd runner-up and Binibining Pilipinas 2013 winner
- Patrick Azanza (BA Sociology) – Governor of Catanduanes (2025–present); President, Catanduanes State University (2021–2025).
- Adelina Barrion (Faculty, Institute of Biological Sciences) – entomologist and geneticist whose extensive contribution to the study of Philippine spiders earned her the moniker "Asia's Spider Woman.
- Teodoro Casiño (BA Sociology) -activist and former member of the House of Representatives of the Philippines
- Mario Dumaual (BA Communication Arts) -ABS CBN Reporter and Producer
- Jiggy Manicad (BA Communication Arts) -journalist and former senatorial candidate
- Cristina Padolina (Faculty, Institute of Chemistry) – Professor Emeritus of Chemistry and 7th President of the Centro Escolar University
- Sue Prado (BA Communication Arts) – film, television, and theatrical actress
- Dolores Ramirez (Faculty, Institute of Biological Sciences) – National Scientist of the Philippines for Biochemical genetics & cytogenetics
- Jessica Sales (Instructor, Department of Social Sciences) – Political Science professor and community organizer who disappeared during martial law under the dictatorship of Ferdinand Marcos. She was a founder of the university chapter of the Student Christian Movement of the Philippines at the University of the Philippines Los Baños.
- Sabrina (BA Communication Arts) -Bossa nova singer
- Rogel Mari Sese (BS Applied Physics) – astrophysicist who is known for being a proponent of space science in the Philippines.
