= Molawin River =

River in Laguna, Philippines

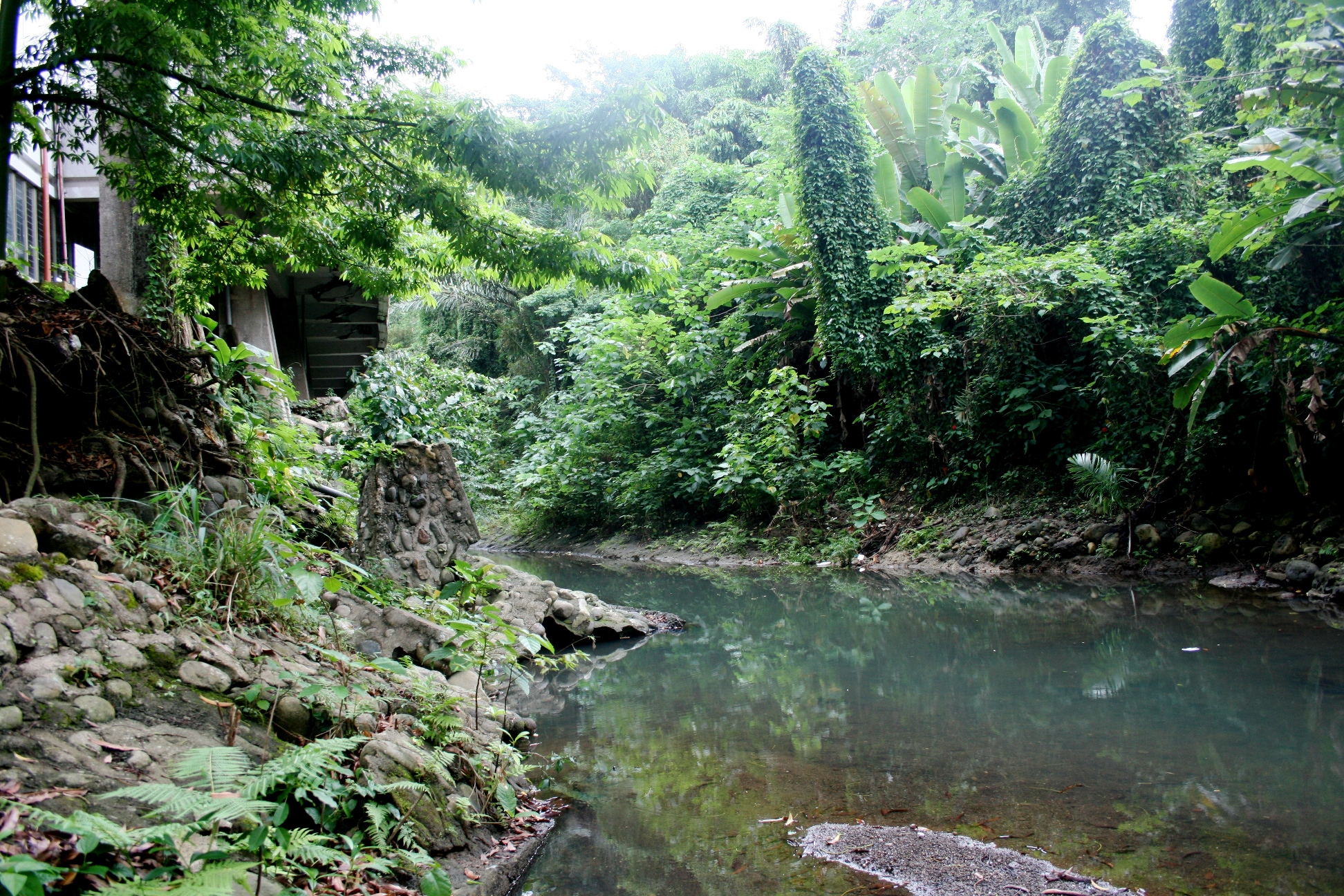
- The banks of the Molawin Creek, viewed from inside the UPLB campus, behind the Student Union building.

Location
- Country: Philippines
- Region: Laguna, Philippines

Physical characteristics
- Source: Mount Makiling
  - elevation: 1,020 m (3,350 ft)
- Mouth
  - location: Los Baños, Laguna
  - coordinates: 14°11′15″N 121°15′34″E
  - elevation: 20 m (66 ft)
- Length: 8.970 km (5.574 mi)
- Basin size: 9.218 km^{2} (3.559 sq mi)(Mount Makiling)
- Discharge
  - location: Laguna de Bay

The Molawin River, also referred to as the Molawin Creek, is one of the many low volume flowing rocky streams crisscrossing the campus of the University of the Philippines Los Baños and some areas of the town of Los Baños. Molawin Creek crosses the whole of the UPLB campus and essentially cuts it in half making it necessary to construct several bridges throughout the university's history to improve the campus' integrity and general accessibility. Volume of flow depends on the average rainfall of the season and develops into a raging river during typhoons or heavy rainfall. It is a minor tributary of Laguna Lake, one among many small creeks that empty into Laguna de Bay. The origins of Molawin Creek and the other creeks in Los Baños have not been pinpointed but are generally accepted to have their origins high up in Mount Makiling. The name Molawin is a local variation of the name of the Molave tree (Vitex parviflora).

== Conservation ==
Water quality monitoring conducted by the University of the Philippines Los Baños in 1996 revealed increasing concentrations of biochemical oxygen demand, conductivity, total dissolved solids (TDS), hardness, TOC, alkalinity, total and dissolved phosphates and nitrates from upstream (Mudspring) to downstream (Kabaritan). The study noticed that nutrients (phosphates and nitrogen fractions) were generally high near the Los Baños garbage dump. The presence of these nutrients leads to eutrophication. That area of the river also exhibited the highest biochemical oxygen demand, indicating high biodegradable organic matter content. Since decaying garbage and domestic wastes from the residents around the area were thrown here, the study, suggested that leachates could have led to these problems.

The Los Baños garbage dump has since been improved and converted into the Los Baños Eco-Waste Management Center, although some controversy regarding the status of the leachate situation have since been raised again.

As in the other tributaries to Laguna de Bay, the Molawin was noted to have low Dissolved Oxygen because of the presence of decaying organic matter, which uses up oxygen.

== Historical significance ==
This creek is historic in the sense that it flows through the campus of UPLB. Thus, by its mere presence, it has shaped the campus' history. UPLB's Senior's Garden, Palma Bridge, Student Union Building, and the Dalambanga statue are also built on its banks, while the main library is on a top of a hill just overlooking Molawin.

On its banks stands Baker Hall, the oldest building on the campus, which was used by the Japanese during world war two as the Los Baños Internment Camp, holding civilian prisoners of war. The battle to liberate it is now known as the Raid at Los Baños.

Palma Bridge crossing the Molawin River

== Superstitions ==
At least in the UPLB campus, many legends have come to surround Molawin, or rather Palma bridge is often said to be haunted by a priest who was a prisoner of war, beheaded by the Japanese. Nearby, the Dalambanga statue of a woman carrying a clay pot is known for moving - her pot carried in different ways every time one looks at her. Another bridge, near the library, is often referred to by students and alumni as "the never ending bridge," because if one were to cross it at the stroke of midnight, one would never reach the end of it and just keep walking until he or she decides to turn their shirt upside down. Another bridge, further up, near the LGU Training Center, has been the site of numerous accidents attributed to the appearance of ghosts.

== See also ==
- Laguna de Bay
- Mount Makiling
- Laguna Lake Development Authority
- University of the Philippines Los Baños
- UPLB Limnological Research Station
