= Leticia E. Afuang =

Filipina biologist and wildlife conservationist

Leticia Espiritu Afuang
- Education: University of the Philippines Los Baños (PhD Environmental Science); University of the Philippines Los Baños (MS Zoology); University of the Philippines Diliman (BS Zoology)
- Known for: Conserving and Investigating the Distribution of Herpetofauna Across the Philippines
- Scientific career
- Fields: Herpetology, Conservation, Ecology, Biodiversity
- Workplaces: University of the Philippines Los Baños, UPLB Museum of Natural History, Central Luzon State University

Leticia "Letty" E. Afuang is a Filipina biologist and wildlife conservationist currently working as a professor under the Animal Biology Division of the Institute of Biological Sciences (IBS) at the University of the Philippines Los Baños (UPLB), located in the Philippine province of Laguna. She is also one of the main curators for the Zoological and Wildlife Collection at the UPLB Museum of Natural History. While known as the "Snake Lady," her research as a herpetologist also focuses on other reptiles, amphibians and a wide array of herpetofauna across the Philippine islands. As an advocate for environmental sustainability, she has founded multiple organizations such as the Mindoro Biodiversity Conservation Foundation and the Biodiversity Conservation Society of the Philippines.

== Early life and education ==
Having grown up on a farm in the province of Isabela, Afuang was fond of animals from a young age. While attending La Salette High School, Afuang's interest in animals, especially amphibians, began to further develop in biology class. She frequently preserved lizard, worm and insect specimens to study after class.

While completing her bachelor's degree in zoology in 1979 from the University of the Philippines Diliman, she gradually shifted her focus to invertebrates. Continuing her interests in biodiversity, she received her master's degree in zoology in 1985 from the University of the Philippines Los Baños. Afuang initially attempted to apply to UP Diliman for her master's degree, but was late during the admissions cycle and was accepted into UP Los Baños instead. She then came to appreciate UP Los Baños and the provincial environment presented there. From the same university, Afuang earned her PhD in environmental science 18 years later, in 2003. By then, she was an expert in planning, developing and managing protected areas with regards to wildlife biology and herpetology.

== Career ==
=== Teaching ===
Shortly after earning her BS in zoology, Afuang began her temporary teaching career at Central Luzon State University (CLSU) located in the province of Nueva Ecija. After teaching for only one semester, she was granted a scholarship to pursue graduate school. After earning her MS in zoology, she would often bring her CLSU students to UPLB for summer trainings in wildlife sciences. In 1989, Afuang was elected to serve as the chairperson of the Department of Biological Sciences at CLSU. After two years, she resigned from CLSU and began teaching continued her career as faculty member, researcher and extensionist at UPLB. Since 1992, she has collaborated with the regional office of the Philippine Department of Education (DepEd) and various non-governmental organizations to instruct Teacher's Training about the conservation of biodiversity and environmental sustainability. Currently, she juggles being a biology professor at UPLB, museum curator for UPLB Museum of Natural History, research scientist and environmental activist.

=== Affiliated organizations ===
Continuing to advocate for sustainability, she became one of the founding members of the Mindoro Biodiversity Conservation Foundation (MBCF), Biodiversity Conservation Society of the Philippines (BCSP, but formally known as the Wildlife Conservation Society of the Philippines), Polillo Island Biodiversity Conservation Foundation, and Herpwatch Philippines. Afuang has previously served as founding president, but is now the vice president of MBCF. From 2001 to 2002, she was also the project manager of the National Biodiversity Conservation Priority Setting Program. This program has provided the foundation for a variety of conservation funding initiatives. Currently, she is the chairperson of the Program Management Committee on MS in Wildlife Studies and the vice chair of the Reptiles and Amphibians Technical Working Group subcommittee for the Philippine Red List of Threatened Committee for Wild Fauna as appointed by the Biodiversity Management Bureau (BMB) of the Department of Environment and Natural Resources. Afuang is also a member of the International Union for Conservation of Nature (IUCN) Species specialist group for the Philippine amphibians and reptiles.

== Research and publications ==
Afuang's interest in snakes and other herpetofauna heavily influenced her fieldwork as a researcher. Afuang began most of her research during her PhD years, which included identifying, classifying and assessing herpetofauna distributions on Mindoro Island. She later investigated a variety of amphibians and reptiles with regards to updating threatened species lists and taxonomy. Her field work spans across the Philippine landscape including Marinduque Island, Luzon Island, Calayan Island, Balesin Island, Pantabangan-Carranglan Watershed, Calamianes Islands-Busuanga, and the Caraballo Mountain Range.

== Selected publications and articles ==
- DG Tabaranza, L Afuang, KL Cielo, JJ Garcia, E Gatumbato, JC Gonzalez, J Retulin, and EH Tan. 2021. "Status and distribution of Philippine Teak (Tectona philippinensis) on Ilin and Ambulong Islands, San Jose, Occidental Mindoro". Philippine Journal of Science Vol. 150 No. S1.
- Afuang, LE., Cielo K.L., Castro N.D.G. 2021. Mindoro Treasures (Teaching Reference for Environment Awareness and Sustainable Resources): An Environmental Sourcebook. Southeast Asian Regional Center for Graduate Study and Research in Agriculture (SEARCA) and Mindoro Biodiversity Conservation Foundation (MBCFI).
- Pitogo, Kier Mitchel E.; Saavedra, Aljohn Jay L.; Aurellado, Maria Eleanor B.; de Guia, Anna Pauline O.; Afuang, Leticia E. (2021-09-24). "Functional traits and environment drive montane amphibian distribution in the southern Philippines". Biodiversity and Conservation. 30 (14): 4177–4197. doi:10.1007/s10531-021-02299-0. ISSN 0960-3115
- Gojo Cruz, Paul Henric; Afuang, Leticia; Gonzalez, Juan Carlos; Gruezo, William (2019-02-14). "Distribution and diversity patterns of herpetofauna in the Pantabangan-Carranglan Watershed, Nueva Ecija, Caraballo Mountain Range, Philippines". Biodiversity Data Journal. 7. doi:10.3897/bdj.7.e31638. ISSN 1314-2828.
- Lastica-Ternura, E.A., L.E. Afuang, J.B. Balatibat, J.S. Masangkay. 2018. "Ecological implications of domestic cat ranges on the Calayan Rail in the forest sanctuary of Calayan Island". SYLVATROP: The Technical Journal of Philippine Ecosystems and Natural Resources. 2018. V28(1):17-30.
- Tabaranza, Don Geoff E., Emmanuel Schütz, Juan Carlos T. Gonzalez, Leticia E. Afuang. 2018. "Mindoro Warty Pig (Sus oliveri)" Groves, 1997, Chapter 16 pp 162–169 in Mario Melleti and Eril Meijaard. 2018. Ecology, Evolution and Management of Wild Pigs and Peccaries. Implications for Conservation. Cambridge University Press.
- Gojo Cruz, Paul Henric P., Afuang, Leticia, Gonzalez, Juan Carlos T., Tabaranza, Geoff E., Alejado, Michelle D., Cajano, Mary Ann O., and Afuang, Danielle Lois E. 2016. "Diversity and Distribution Of Herpetofauna of Balesin Island, Polillo, Quezon, Philippines". Sylvatrop. The Technical Journal of Philippine Ecosystems and Natural Resources. Vol 26 Nos. 1 & 2, Jan–Dec 2016, pp 20–37.
- Diesmos, Arvin C., Jessa L. Watters, Nicholas A. Huron, Drew R. Davis, Angel C. Alcala, Ronald I. Crombie, Leticia E. Afuang, Genevieve Gee-Das, Rogelio V. Sison, Marites B. Sanguila, Michelle L. Penrod, Marie J. Labonte, Conner S. Davey, E. Austin Leone, Mae L. Diesmos, Emerson Y. Sy, Luke J. Welton, Rafe M. Brown and Cameron D. Siler. 2015. "Amphibians of the Philippines, Part 1: Checklist of the Species". Proceedings of the California Academy of Sciences Series 4, Volume 62, Part 3, No. 20, pp 457–539, 44 figs.
- Phillip A. Alviola, Joseph Paolo A. Macasaet, Leticia E. Afuang, Edison A.Cosico, Eduardo G. Eres 2. 2015. "Cave-Dwelling Bats of Marinduque Island, Philippines". Museum Publication of Natural History. Vol. 4: 1–17.
- Lacaste, AV, L E. Afuang, and JCT. Gonzalez. 2015. "Comparison of Herpetofaunal Diversity Among Four Major Islands of Batanes Province, Northern Philippines". Journal of Nature Studies 14 (1): 36-46 ISSN: 1655–3179
- Monika Böhm 1* et al., 2013 "The Conservation Status of the World's Reptiles". Biological Conservation 157 (2013) 372–385.
- Pagaduan D.C. and L. E. Afuang. 2012. "Understorey bird species diversity along elevational gradients on the northeastern slope of Mt. Makiling, Luzon, Philippines" Asia Life Sciences: The Asian International Journal of Life Sciences 21(2): pp. 565–586, 2012.

== Legacy ==
=== Awards and recognition ===
Afuang was granted the Outstanding Extensionist Award for her duty as a diligent and hardworking professor/curator at UPLB in 2012. She was then featured under the UPLB Outstanding Personnel list on the UPLB Office of Alumni Relations Website. On the same year, she was also recognized as Outstanding Alumnus by the School of Environmental Science and Management (SESAM).

Afuang was also the co-author of several editions of Sourcebooks, such as the "Mindoro Treasures", which serves as a teaching guide for environmental awareness. "Mindoro Treasures" has won two awards including the Quill Award in 2019 and an Asia-Pacific Stevie Award for innovation in the non-profit/NGO category in 2020.

The organizations that Afuang co-founded (MBCFI and BCSP) have also been recognized. Notable MBCFI awards include the Silver Anvil Award from the Public Relations Society of the Philippines in 2017, and a Certificate of Recognition from the Department of Education - Calapan Division. In addition, BCSP has been hosting the annual Philippine Biodiversity Symposium since 1992. During these symposiums, local and international wildlife biologists discuss recent research developments about Philippine biodiversity conservation efforts.

=== Popular media ===
Afuang also features as a co-host on the YouTube channel "Kwentong Likas Yaman Clips". Her episodes are titled "Kwentong Likas Yaman nina Doc JD at Doc Letty", and she and her co-host features guests who discuss various environmental issues, personal stories, ongoing conservation efforts and other relevant issues on environment ethics and values. Additionally, she is a frequent scientific guest on popular Philippine TV shows such as "Born to be Wild", "Kapuso Mo Jessica Sojo", "Brigada Syete", and other radio shows.

=== Retirement ===
With retirement in the near future, one of Afuang's greatest achievements during her career was increasing students' interests in herpetology and drawing more attention to environmental issues. The course and research in Herpetology at UPLB, after being inactive for 3 years, was revived by Afuang herself. By inviting distinguished guest lecturers such as Angel Alcala and other faculty to co-teach, Afuang gradually reignited the curiosity for herpetology. Despite being accidentally envenomated by a viper during fieldwork in 2002, she still focuses on herps and snakes in her works. In addition to promoting wildlife education, her focus in identifying priority areas for conservation in the Philippines has been foundational to the Philippine ecosystem.
