= University of the Philippines Los Baños Limnological Research Station =

University of the Philippines, Los Baños Limnological Research Station
- Established: August 17, 1928
- Location: (Philippines) Los Baños, Laguna, Philippines

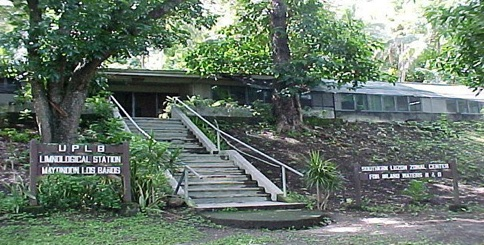
The UPLB Limnological Research Station

The UPLB Limnological Research Station traces its root from the Department of Entomology, of the then UP College of Agriculture. Since its conception, the station contributed immensely to the understanding of the bounties of Laguna de Bay and helped establish the duck farming industry on Los Baňos foreshores and pioneered in aquarium fish production in the country. It serves as the base for studies on limnology and biology of aquatic organisms aimed at developing strategies for the optimum utilization and sustained production of aquatic resources; developing, adapting or improving conventional technologies used to increase fish production; and promoting environment friendly approaches for effective water management.

== History ==
=== Pre-War ===
The idea of institutionalizing a Limnological Station began as a result of collaboration between Dr. Leopoldo B. Uichanco, professor and head of the Department of Entomology of the then UP College of Agriculture and Albert William Herre, then Chief of Fisheries Division, Bureau of Science, Department of Agriculture and Natural Resources on ‘Dolong’, a species of goby that can be found in Laguna de Bay (Ref: Letter of Albert W. Herre to Dr. L.B. Uichangco dated January 19, 1926, UPLB LRS archive # 1). On August 17, 1928, the UP College of Agriculture Limnological Research and Aquatic Resources Management Center was established with Proclamation No. 176 signed by Governor General Henry L. Stimson (Gov. Gen from Dec. 27, 1927 to February 23, 1929) as its backbone and maintained as a facility under the Department of Entomology.

Under Dr. L.B. Uichangco’s diligent efforts, more researches on aquatic animals and more courses in Zoology were instituted. Dr. Deogracias V. Villadolid, upon his return after getting his Ph.D. in Aquatic Biology from Stanford University in 1927, Zoology was no longer a mere background to entomology. Dr. Villadolid, who became head of the station more than any other, was responsible for the enhanced development of fisheries in the Philippines. Dr. Villadolid together with Messrs. Andres M. Mane and F. Alonte eventually left the department in 1934 and transferred to the Bureau of Fisheries now known as the Bureau of Fisheries and Aquatic Resources (BFAR) and served as its director, and later became an aquatic biologist of the Fish and Game Administration (Gabriel, 1979), operations of the station naturally ceased.

Since then, work has not been resumed primarily due to lack of funds and low priority assigned to the activity in addition to the onset of World War II in 1941.

=== World War II ===
World War II brought the Department back to almost where it was in 1909. Cendana (1959) narrated that during the Japanese occupation, it was impossible to do any kind of research work. But instruction went on throughout the war years, although only two courses, Zoology 1 and Entomology 1, could be offered. During the end of war, retreating Japanese soldiers burned the Entomology Building on February 23, 1945. With it was burned everything that took the Department 32 years to accumulate including extensive insect and zoological collections, irreplaceable biological notes, valuable books and all the equipment.

=== Post-War ===
The UP College of Agriculture was re-opened in June 1945, with Dean L.B. Uichanco as the concurrent head of the Department of Entomology. Upon the establishment of the College of Arts and Humanities (renamed on October 28, 1977 College of Arts and Sciences) on December 21, 1972, Zoology became one of its seven initial departments. When the programs in Hydrozoology and Wildlife Zoology were instituted, the need to reactivate and bring the Station back to its real potentials consequently started. In 1975, an ad hoc committee for the reactivation of the Station was formed with Dr. Cesar P. Madamba of the Department of Zoology, CAS as Chairman. Members of the committee were Dr. W.P. David, Dr. B.L. Cariaso, Dr. B.P. Gabriel, Dr. V.J. Calilung and Dr. C.R. Barril. They initiated plans and activities for the research station at the University level. After the construction of the new Station, an ad hoc committee was formed to conceptualize research plans and other developments regarding aquatic resources management, also with Dr. Madamba as Chairman with the original five members of the reactivation committee and Mr. Batoon from ACCI as an addition. The Station was renamed UPLB Limnological Research Station.

At the time it was reserved, the Station ground directly bordered Laguna de Bay. However, there has been built up - as a result in part of the accumulation of sand and shell by constant wave action and in part of the recession of the lake's water - a foreshore accretion between the original reservation and the Lake. Since the Station's research activities in the waters of the Lake cannot very well be carried out without direct access to it, the Station's premises were extended, as the waters of the Lake receded, to this accretion area. Aware of the need for a Freshwater Research Center, then Philippine President Ferdinand E. Marcos proclaimed the Reservation Area under Proclamation No. 1678, thereby amending Proclamation No. 176, signed at UPLB on October 10, 1977 making the Station's total land area at 4.077 hectares.

=== Present ===
The UPLB Limnological Research Station (popularly called Limno Station or just Limno) is being managed by the Animal Biology Division, Institute of Biological Sciences, College of Arts and Sciences. The Station has a total land area of 4.78 ha. situated at the foreshore of Laguna de Bay in Barangay Mayondon, Los Baňos Laguna.

On January 28, 1994, the Station was identified and established as the National Center for Inland Waters Research and Development by the Philippine Council for Aquatic and Marine Research and Development-Department of Science and Technology (PCAMRD-DOST). The Station is also the seat of PCAMRD-DOST's Southern Luzon Zonal Center for Aquatic and Marine R&D (Zonal Center 2).

The UPLB Limnological Research Station once again plays an important role in the fisheries sector through the leadership of their Station Manager, Dr. Pablo P. Ocampo, paving the way towards achieving its goals to: (1) develop optimum utilization and sustained production of aquatic resources; (2) conduct limnological studies; (3) conduct training and extension activities on different aspects of aquarium fish production; (4) develop culture technique for live feeds; (5) develop new aquarium varieties from indigenous fish species; and, (6) conduct captive breeding on some selected endemic/endangered freshwater fish species.

== Goals ==
- Develop optimum utilization and sustained production of aquatic resources
- Conduct limnological studies
- Conduct captive breeding studies on some endemic/endangered fish species
- Conduct training and extension activities on different aspects of aquarium fish production
- Develop culture techniques for live feeds
- Develop new aquarium varieties from indigenous fish species

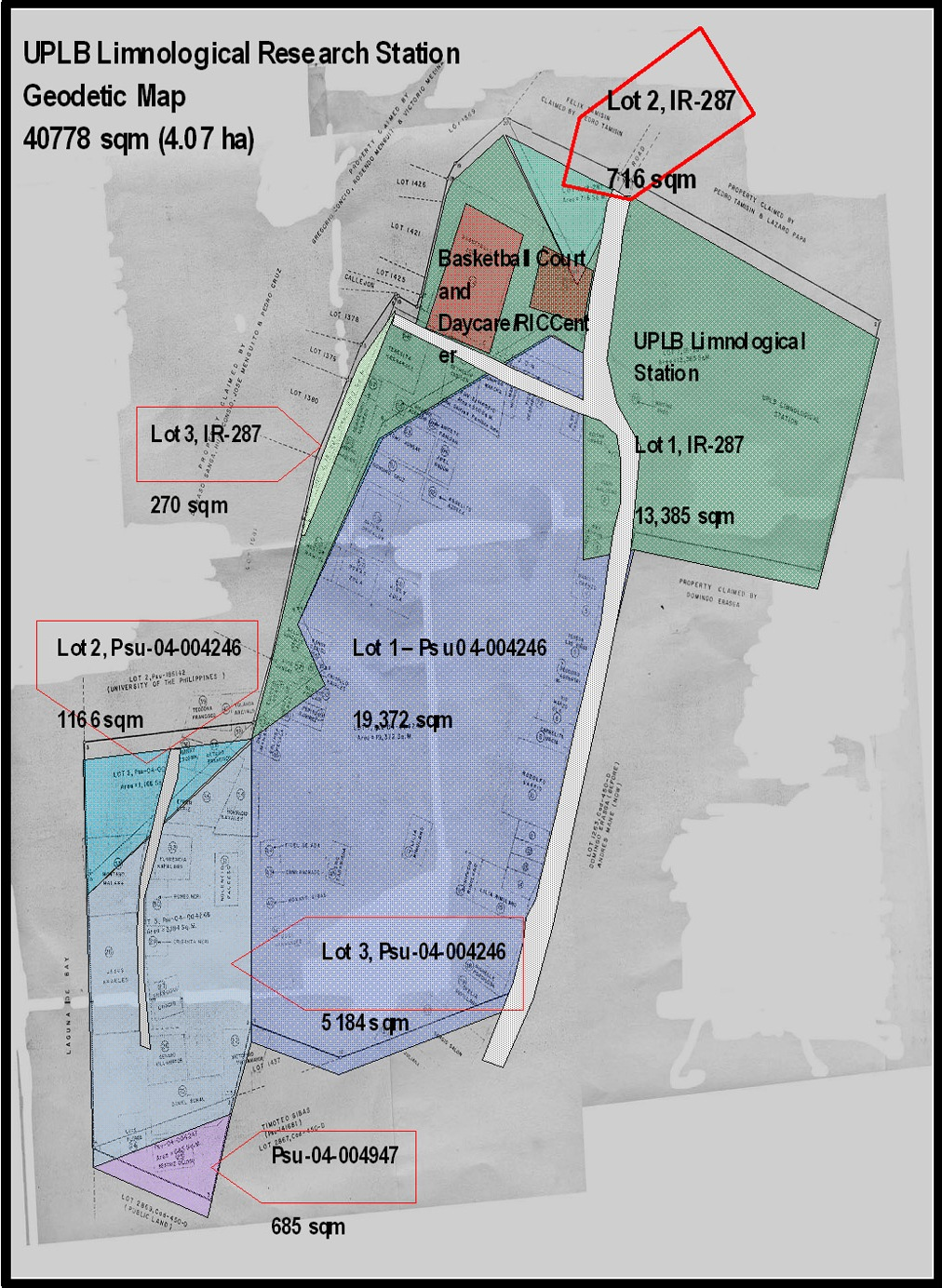
Total Land Area of UPLB Limnological Research Station located in Mayondon, Los Baños, Laguna

== Research Fields ==
- Limnological studies
- Endemic/endangered fish propagation
- Aquarium fish culture
- Aquatic plant culture
- Fish parasites and diseases

== Extension Activities ==
TECHNICAL ASSISTANCE

- Cooperators in aquarium fish production project
- Researchers from different institution and government agencies
- Fisherfolk organizations and interested private individuals
- Student researchers

CONDUCT TRAININGS

- Aquarium fish production
- Limnological techniques

== Facilities ==
Hatchery
Incubators
Fry-rearing tanks
Grow-out ponds
Library
Conference/Training Room
Three equipped Research Laboratories

=== Ornamental Fish Laboratory ===
- Angel Fish Breeding
- Fighting Fish Breeding

=== Captive Breeding Laboratory ===
- Leiopotherapon plumbeus (Ayungin) Breeding
- Glossogobius celebius (Rock Goby) Breeding

=== Biology Laboratory ===
- Live Native and Endemic Diminutive Freshwater Fish Collection
- Ichthyological (Pisces) Reference Collection

== Fish Ark Philippines ==
Program Leader: Dr. Pablo P. Ocampo

Fish Ark Philippines: Direction for the Conservation of Native and Endemic Philippine Freshwater Fishes, a program funded by the Department of Science and Technology (DOST) through the Philippine Council for Aquatic and Marine Research and Development (PCAMRD), with an overall objectives in line with the Philippine Strategy for Biological Conservation, the National Biodiversity Strategy and Action Plan and the Provisions No. 24 of Republic Act 9147 (otherwise known as the Philippine Conservation and Protection Act). The program will also address gaps in our knowledge of the species richness of freshwater aquatic fauna and inland ecosystems, particularly from inland waters.

The main goals of the program are the following: (1) to develop an equip aqua laboratory where threatened and endangered native or endemic freshwater fishes can be provided with safe refuge until such time that adequate and protected natural habitat can be established; (2) to establish a self-sustaining captive breeding program and produce adequate breeding stock as backup populations, and attempt to develop techniques to prepare animals for re-introduction; (3) to document the status of different freshwater species in the wild, and set priorities for species to be conserved or re-introduced; and, (4) to develop information delivery systems that would underscore conservation education and public awareness that can create local support necessary in sustaining re-introduction efforts.

The program has four component projects:

- Component Project I: Survey of Diminutive Freshwater Fishes Indigenous to Isolated Crater Lakes, Mountain Streams and Cataracts in Southern Luzon, Philippines

(Project Leader: Dr. Vachel Gay V. Paller)

- Component Project II: Captive Breeding of the Native and Endemic Diminutive Freshwater Fishes

(Project Leader: Dr. Pablo P. Ocampo)

- Component Project III: Biochemical and Cytogenetic Profile of Selected Native and Endemic Philippine Freshwater Fishes

(Project Leader: Dr. Roberto C. Reyes)

- Component Project IV: Isolation and Characterization of Microsatellites in Selected Native and Endemic Philippine Freshwater Fishes

(Project Leader: Dr. Maria Genaleen Q. Diaz)
