= Indigenous Philippine shrines and sacred grounds =

Holy places in Philippine folk religions

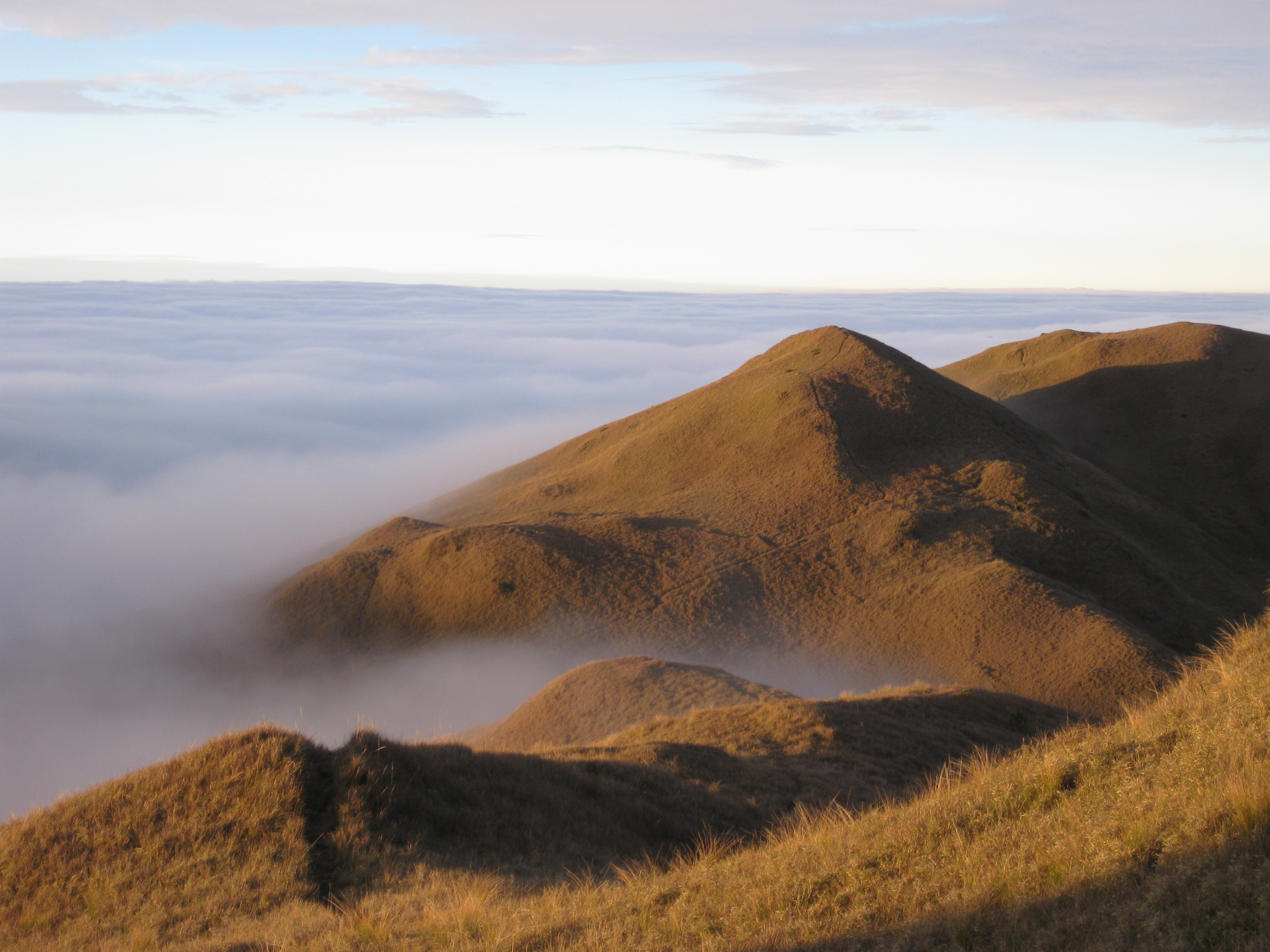
Mount Pulag is the home of the tinmongao spirits and the sacred resting ground of the souls of the Ibaloi people and other ethnic peoples in the area.

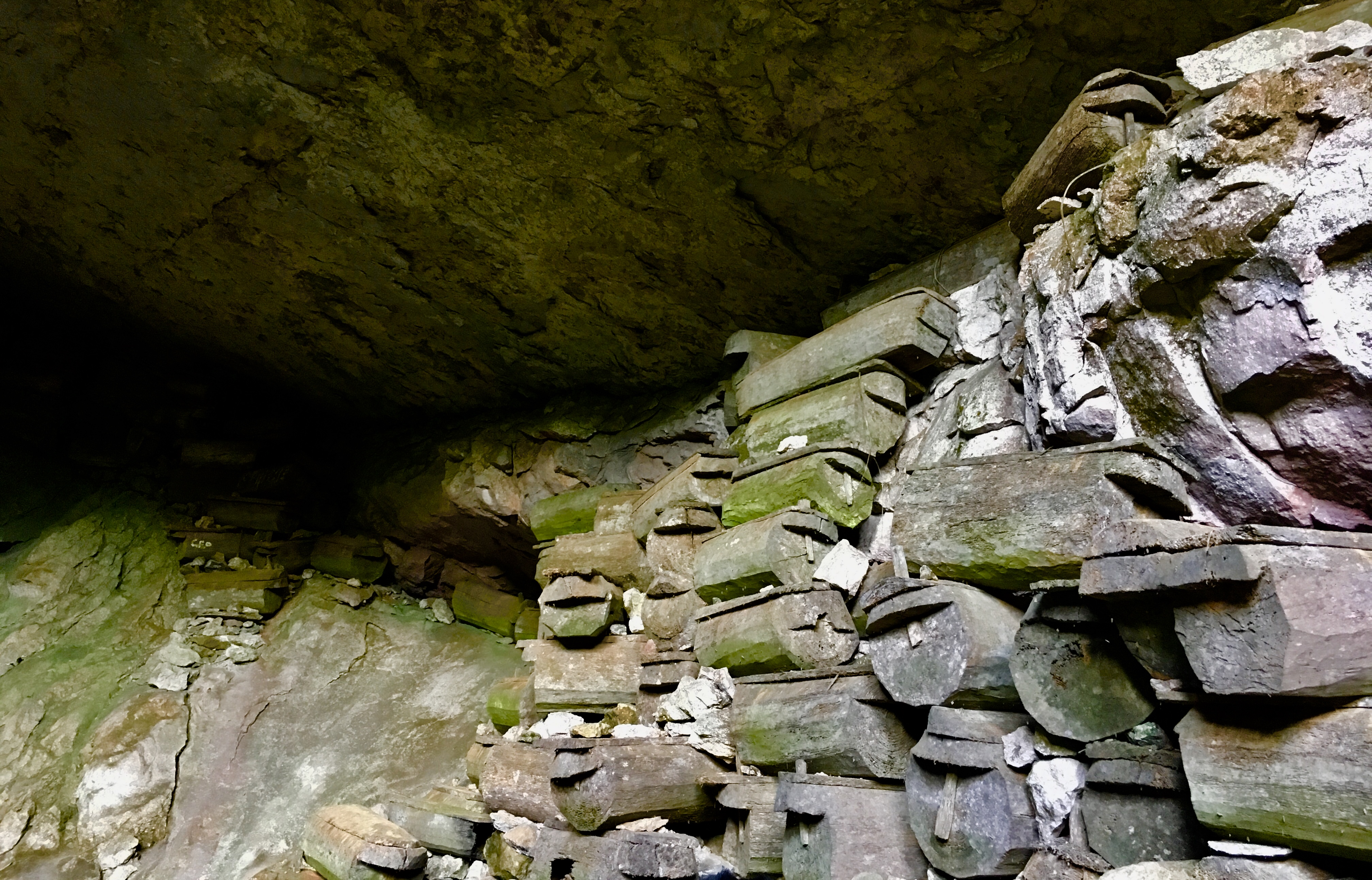
A Kankanaey burial cave in Sagada with coffins stacked-up to form a sky burial within a cave.

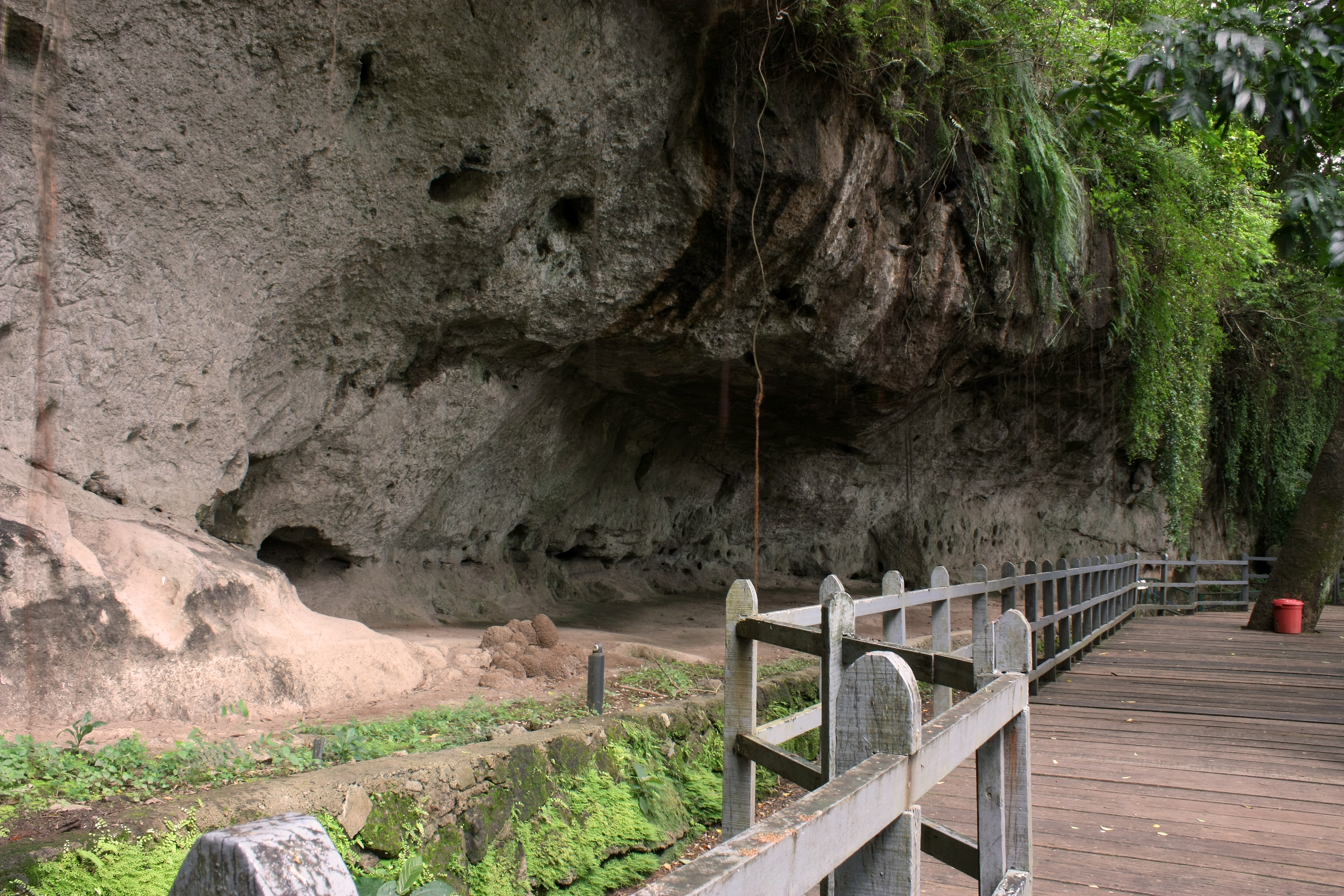
The rock wall where the Angono Petroglyphs can be found. The site is considered as a dambana due to the presence of ancient figures drawn on the rock walls for healing purposes. It was rediscovered only in 1965.

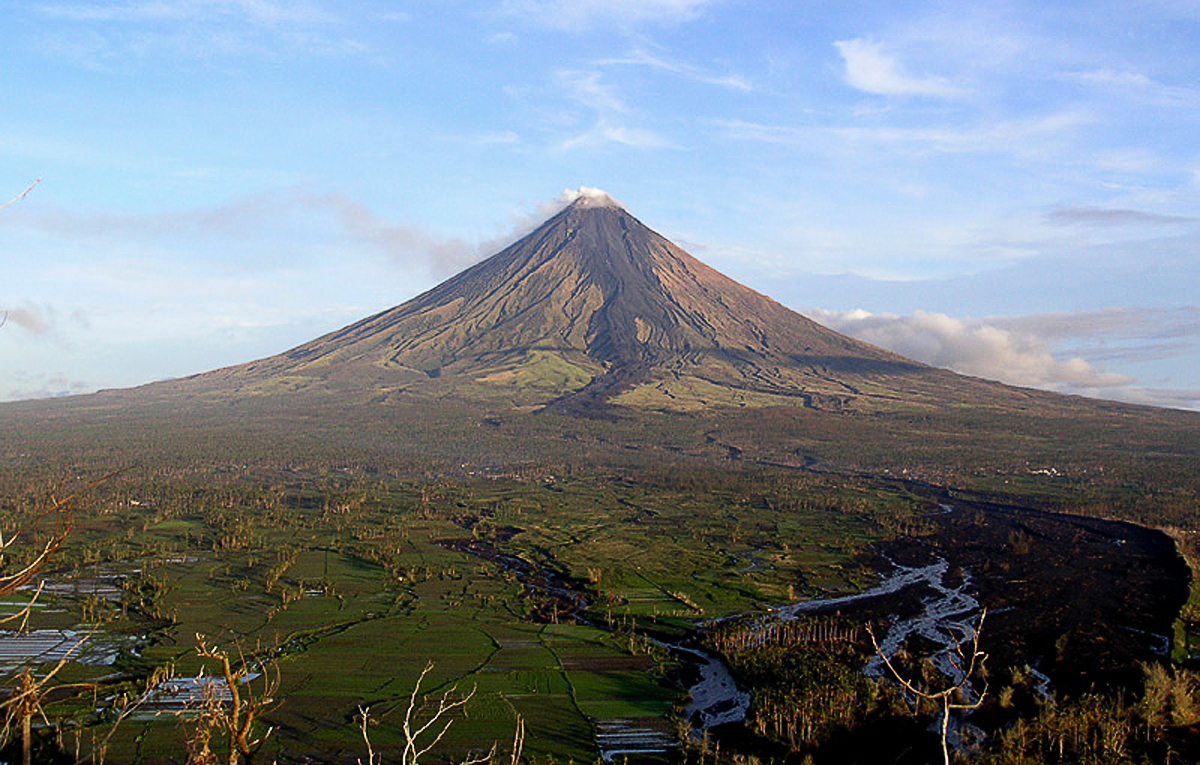
Mayon is a sacred volcano among the Bicolano people. It is the home of their supreme deity, Gugurang.

Indigenous Philippine shrines and sacred grounds are places regarded as holy within the indigenous Philippine folk religions. These places usually serve as grounds for communication with the spirit world, especially to the deities and ancestral spirits. In some cases, they also function as safeguards for the caskets of ancestors, as well as statues or other objects depicting divine entities.

== Overview ==
Ancient Filipinos and Filipinos who continue to adhere to the indigenous Philippine folk religions generally do not have so-called "temples" of worship under the context known to foreign cultures. However, they do have sacred shrines, which are also called as spirit houses. They can range in size from small roofed platforms, to structures similar to a small house (but with no walls), to shrines that look similar to pagodas, especially in the south where early mosques were also modeled in the same way. These shrines were known in various indigenous terms, which depend on the ethnic group association. (Note: Known as magdantang in Visayan and ulango or simbahan in Tagalog. Among the Itneg, shrines are known tangpap, pangkew, or alalot (for various small roofed altars); and balaua or kalangan (for larger structures). In Mindanao, shrines are known among the Subanen as maligai; among the Teduray as tenin (only entered by shamans); and among the Bagobo as buis (for those built near roads and villages) and parabunnian (for those built near rice fields).(Kroeber, 1918)) They can also be used as places to store taotao and caskets of ancestors. Among Bicolanos, taotao were also kept inside sacred caves called moog.

During certain ceremonies, anito are venerated through temporary altars near sacred places. These were called latangan or lantayan in Visayan and dambana or lambana in Tagalog. (Note: Also saloko or palaan (Itneg); sakolong (Bontoc); salagnat (Bicolano); sirayangsang (Tagbanwa); ranga (Teduray); and tambara, tigyama, or balekat (Bagobo) The term lambana was later syncretized with fairies, commonly depicted as tiny winged beings in many illustrations a homonym for the alternate term dambana has come to mean "shrine" or "chapel" in modern Tagalog) These bamboo or rattan altars are identical in basic construction throughout most of the Philippines. They were either small roof-less platforms or standing poles split at the tip (similar to a tiki torch). They held halved coconut shells, metal plates, or martaban jars as receptacles for offerings. Taotao may sometimes also be placed on these platforms.

Other types of sacred places or objects of worship of diwata include the material manifestation of their realms. The most widely venerated were balete trees (also called nonok, nunuk, nonoc, etc.) and anthills or termite mounds (punso). Other examples include mountains, waterfalls, tree groves, reefs, and caves.

=== Terminology ===
Each ethnic group in the Philippines has their own terms concerning their shrines and sacred grounds, which are diverse in number.

- Itneg: tangpap, pangkew, alalot, balaua, kalangan, saloko, palaan
- Bontok: sakolong
- Tagalog: dambana, lambana, simbahan, ulango
- Bicolano: moog, salagnat
- Tagbanwa: sirayangsang
- Bisaya: magdantang
- Visayan (general): latangan, lantayan
- Subanen maligai
- Teduray: tenin, ranga
- Bagobo: buis, parabunnian, tambara, tigyama, balekat
- Tausūg: langgal

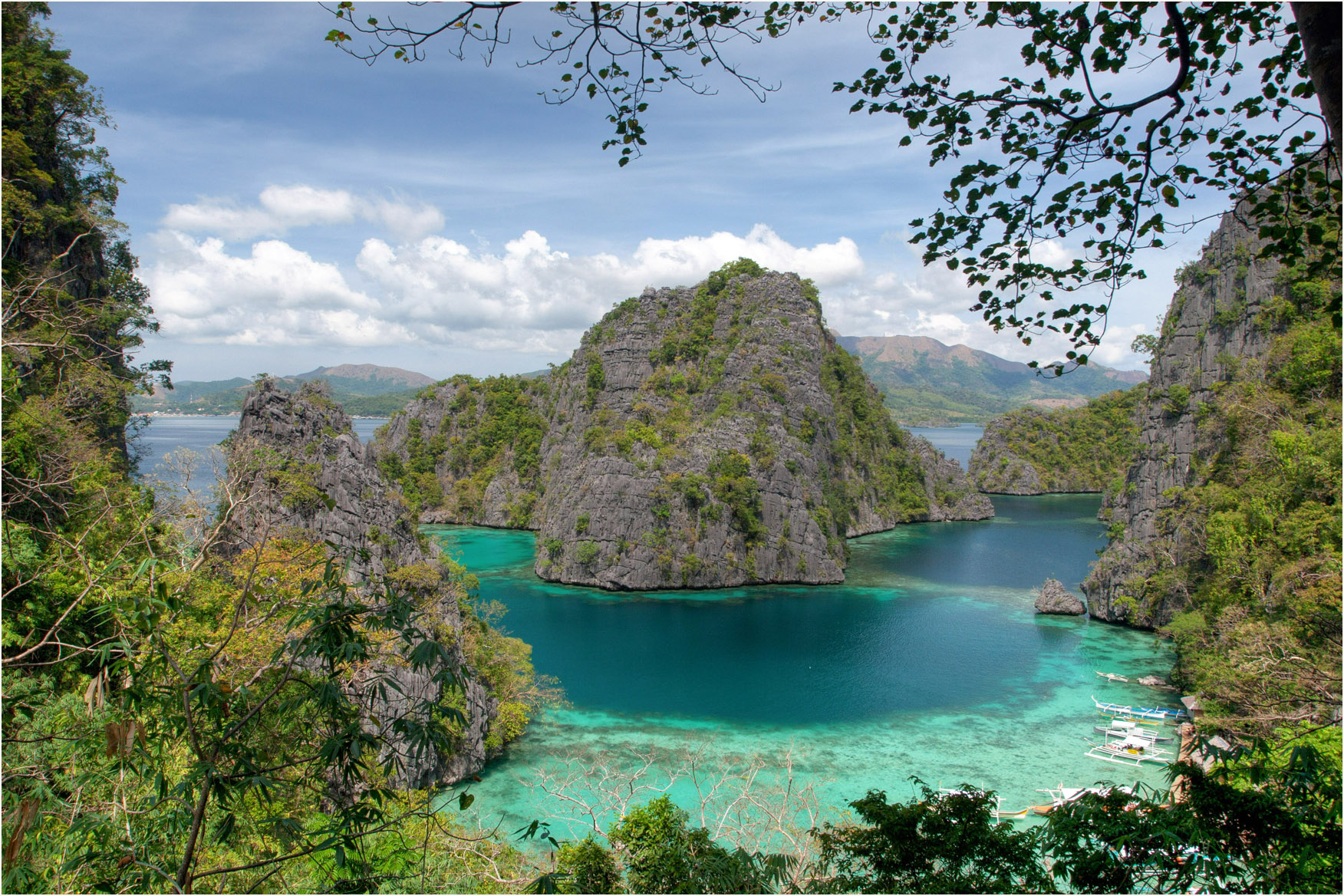
The lakes of Coron are the sacred home of an octopus deity revered by the Tagbanwa.

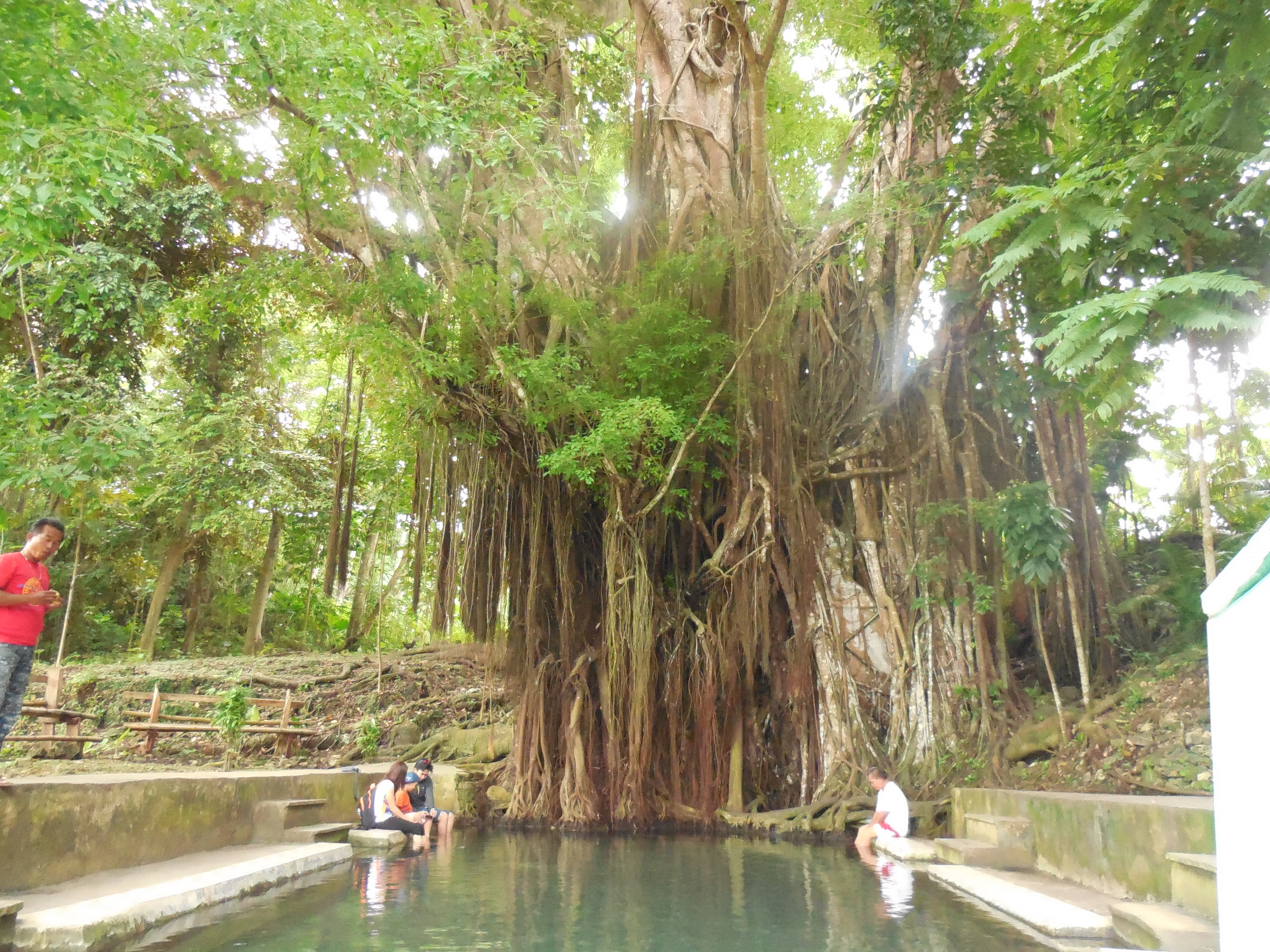
A 400-year-old balete tree in Lazi, Siquijor. The tree is a shrine home of a local deity among the Bisaya people.

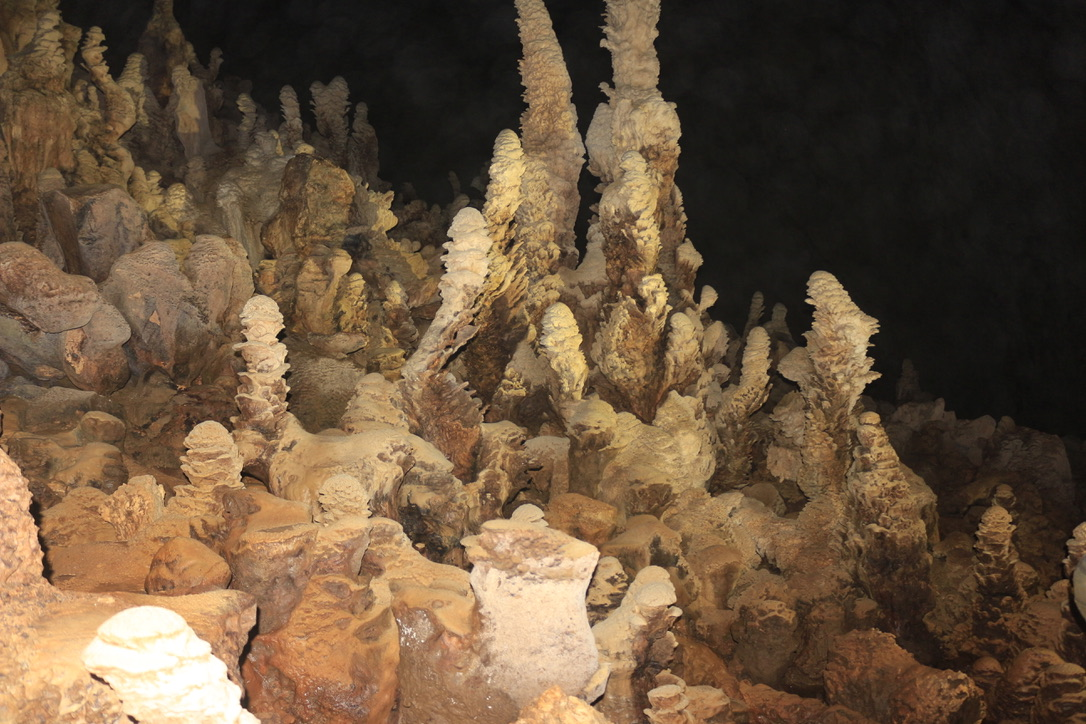
The Langun-Gobingob Cave System within the interior of Samar is a sacred abode for the Waray people.

== Man-made sacred grounds ==
The shrine can be a sacred structure built with different materials, depending on the locality, but the usual shrine structure is made from indigenous wood with nipa roofs. No metal nails are used in its construction. The wood pieces are shaped in a way that each block would stick tightly to each other. At the same time, the wood bonds are strengthened by rattan strips. Majority of these man-made shrine structures (along with the materials assigned to shrine traditions such as statues home to anitos, statues reserved for burial practices in the future, and documents with indigenous writings and calligraphy) were unfortunately destroyed by the Spanish in the 16th century, while transforming the land where the shrine structures were built upon into Catholic cemeteries or locations for Roman Catholic churches. The Relacion de las Yslas Filipinas of 1582 recorded the existence of ancient sacred structures that contained "one hundred or two hundred [idol statues]", which the Spanish all burned down and destroyed. These idols were the statues of departed loved ones, which the natives used to contact the spirits of their deceased ancestor or friend and the deities. Additionally, Amoroso and Abinales (2005) wrote that the Spaniards also ordered native children by force to 'defecate' on the native people's idol statues, in a bid to further mock the natives and their indigenous religions. The purge against shrine structures and all things related to the indigenous Philippine folk religions were continued by the Spanish until the 19th century, leaving no shrine structures left throughout areas subjugated by the Spanish Crown.

== Natural sacred grounds ==
In addition, not all shrines are house structures. Some shrines may be traditional non-Western cemeteries (libingan), ancient ruins or old places (sinaunang pook), rivers (ilog), mountains (bundok), mounds (burol), seas (karagatan), caves (yungib), lakes (lawa), forests (gubat) giant trees (malalaking puno) such as balete (one of the three most sacred trees for the Tagalogs, the other two being kawayan or bamboo and buko or coconut tree), and other places known to the natural and spiritual world, except for swamps, which are called buhay na tubig (living waters) and are considered as sacred but dangerous to the Tagalog people in pre-colonial times due to the presence of life-threatening supernatural beings. The presence of these natural shrines is one of the primary reasons why indigenous belief systems continued to exist despite the Spanish-imposed all-out destruction of shrine structures. Due to colonization, majority of the indigenous shrine practices have been lost, fragmented severely, or absorbed into Christian practices, such as the case in pilgrim devotion practices in Mount Makiling, which has Catholic and indigenous practices involved. The unaltered shrine practices of the Filipino ethnic groups are similar to shrine practices in Asia, such as the shrine practices in Japan, Bali, and India.

== Notable sacred places ==
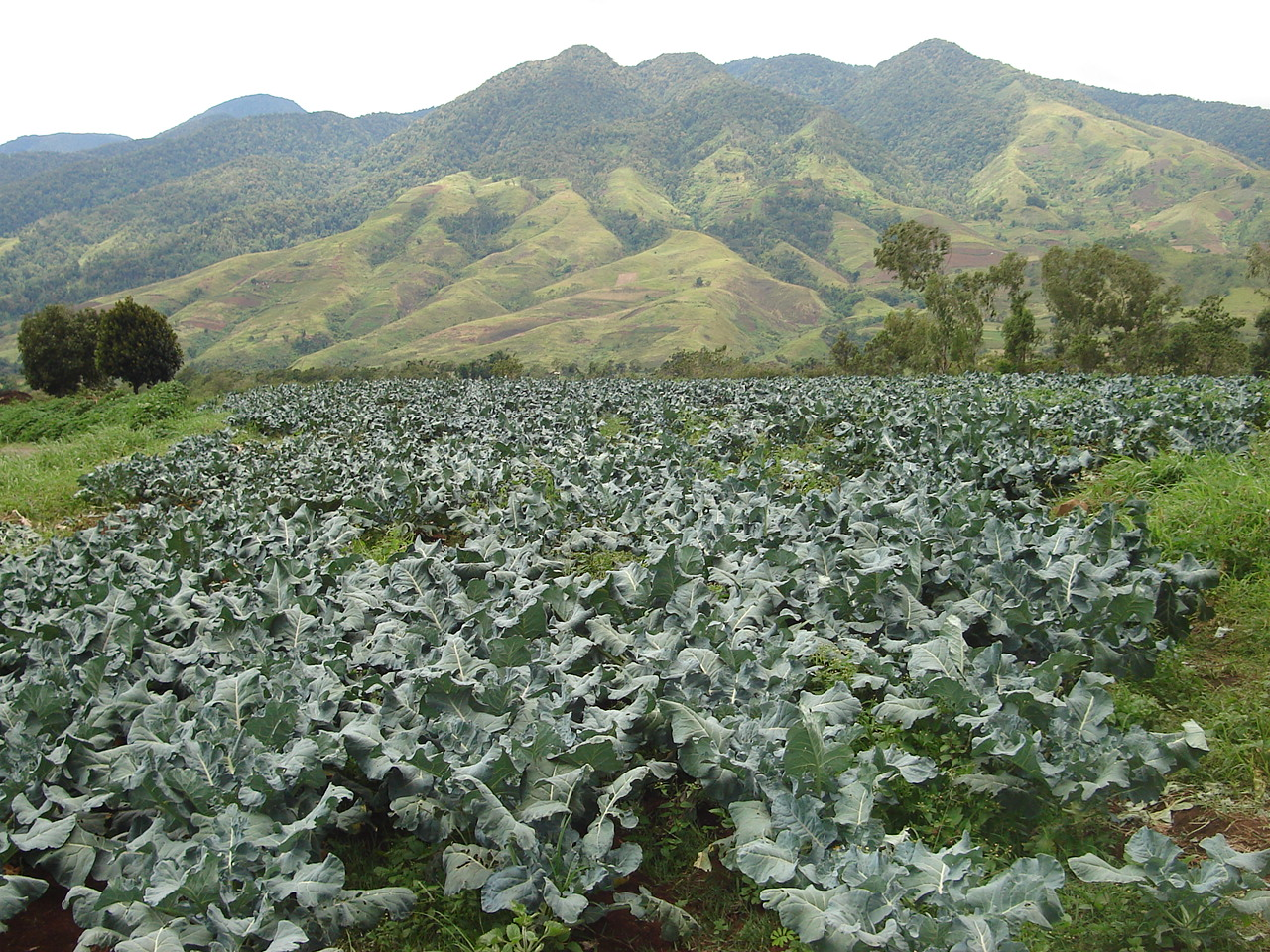
Mount Kalatungan is the home of a sacred Igmale’ng’en forest regarded highly by the people of the area, especially the Talaandig.

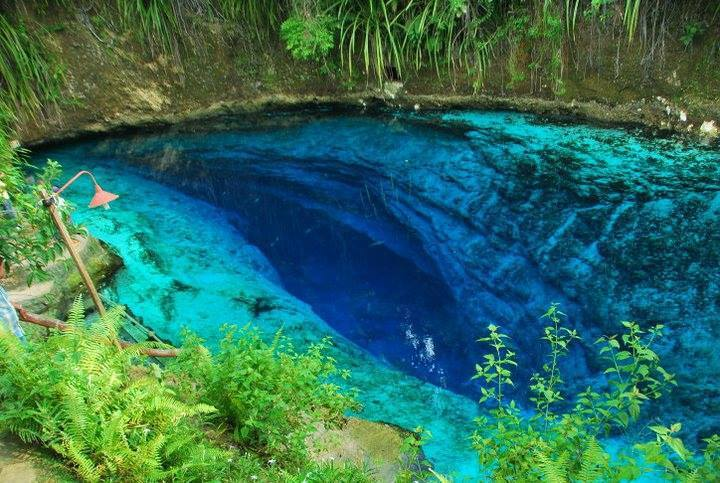
The Hinatuan Enchanted River is protected by supernatural beings who cast enchanted protection on certain fishes according to the beliefs of the Surigaonon people.

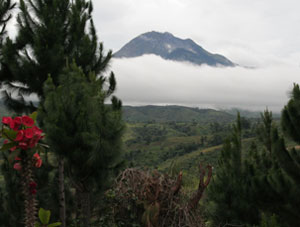
Mount Apo is a sacred mountain for various ethnic groups such as the Bagobo, Manobo, and Kalagan, and other groups surrounding the holy grounds.

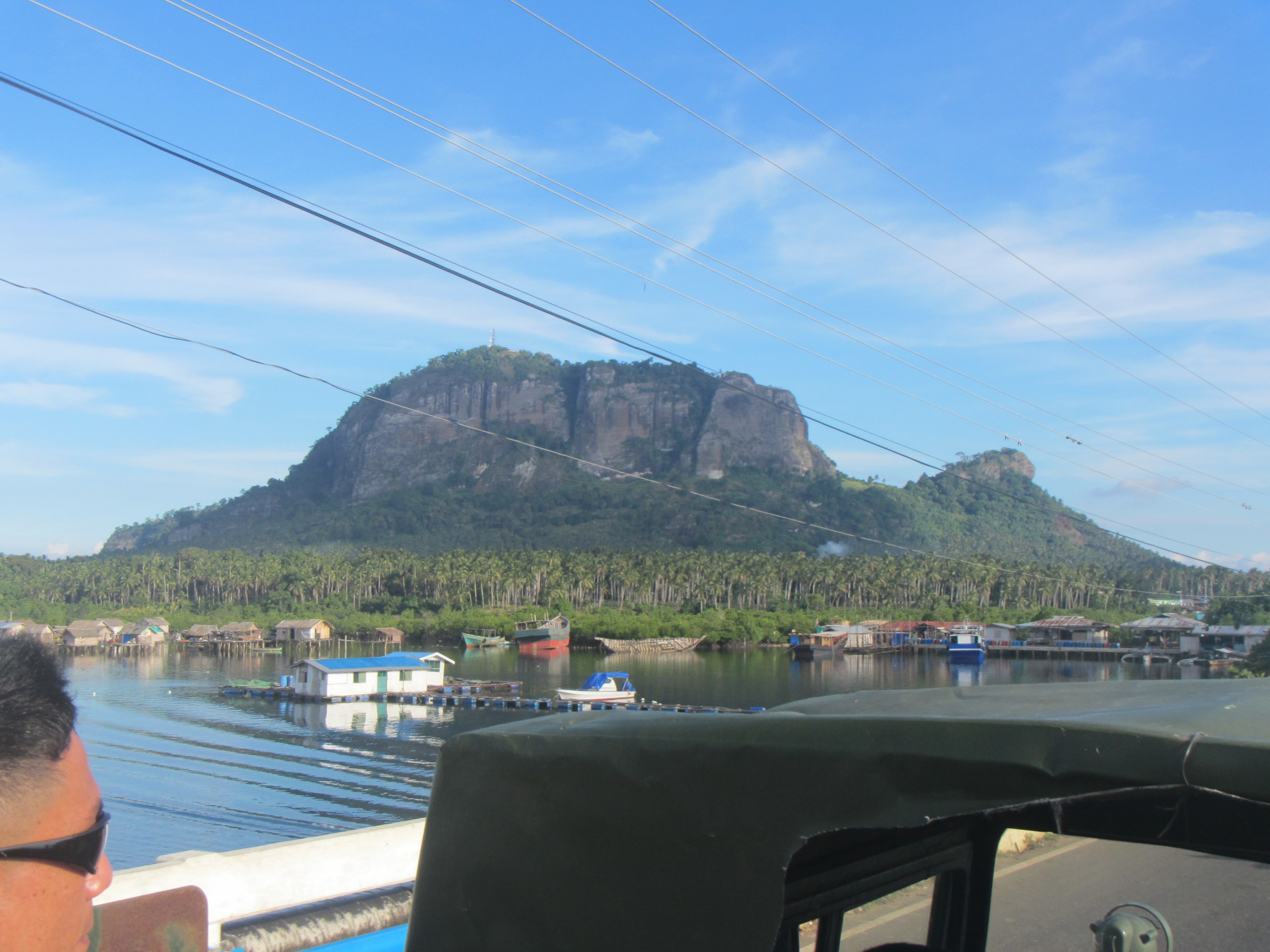
Bud Bongao is a sacred mountain protected by spirits from the indigenous religion of the Sama-Bajau.

Most of the remaining sacred places are natural, and not man-made, as majority of the man-made shrines were completely destroyed by the Spanish during a 300-year Catholic-colonial period from the 16th century to the 19th century. However, remnants of man-made shrines have been rediscovered since the middle of the 20th century, such as the Angono Petroglyphs in Rizal which was rediscovered in 1965 and the Limestone tombs of Kamhantik in Quezon province which was rediscovered in 2011. Prominent natural shrines or sacred grounds vary, but the most notable are the mountains and volcanoes. Additionally, mythological shrines and sacred places also abound within the diverse concepts known in the indigenous Philippine folk religions.

Some examples of the many traditional sacred places today are as follow:

- Mount Canatuan – a sacred mountain in Siocon, Zamboanga del Norte for the Subanen people, who believe that the mountain is the home of a variety of well-respected nature spirits; the divine mountain was destroyed by a mining company, and a huge mass of it has been transformed into the Canatuan mine, despite indigenous protests
- Pulangi River – a sacred river in central Mindanao since ancient times; various myths are associated with the river such as the appearance of the Patakoda, and the routes taken by the Maguindanaon epic heroes Indarapatra and Sulayman
- Mayon Volcano – home of the supreme deity of the Bicolano people, Gugurang; repository of the sacred fire of Ibalon; it is said to erupt, rumble, or spout lava or ash whenever the people committed heinous crimes, signaling the people to repent and undo evil things
- Angono Petroglyphs – limestone wall traditionally used for healing purposes by the Tagalog people, who drew infant figures on the wall to "pass-on" a child's sickness onto it
- Mount Pinatubo – home of the powerful Kapampangan moon god, Apûng Malyari, who also rules over the eight sacred rivers; in contrast, the neighboring Mount Arayat is the home of the powerful sun god of war and death, Aring Sinukûan, who taught the early Kapampangans the industry of metallurgy, woodcutting, rice culture and waging wars.
- Mount Pulag – the tallest mountain in Luzon island and is home to the tinmongao spirits; believed to be the sacred resting ground of the souls of the Ibaloi people and other ethnic peoples
- Bud Bongao – a sacred mountain for the Sama-Bajau and Tausug peoples; guarded by spirits and monkeys in Tawi-tawi
- Mount Apo – the tallest and largest mountain in the Philippines and an expansive sacred mountain for the Manobos, Bagobo, Ubos, Atas, Kalagan and Tagacaolo peoples; the mountain is often referred as "grandfather" or "elder"; some ethnic peoples there offer sacrifices to the deity, Mandarangan, for good health and victories in war; in Bagobo beliefs, it is said that two gigantic eels used to live in the mountain's rivers, one went east, lived, and became the ancestor of eels in the sea, while the other one went west inland, eventually dying and becoming the western foot ridges of Mount Apo; the Bagabo also believe that Apo Sandawa, god of blacksmiths, lives in Mount Apo with the deity of the forge, Tolus Ka Gomanan, who is venerated in a ritual called Gomek-gomanan
- Mount Madia-as – home to the Hiligaynon and Karay-a death god, Sidapa, who measures mortal lives through an ancient tree; later stories say that the comely moon god, Bulan, eventually lived with the robust and handsome Sidapa in his mountain home after a complex courtship and rescue story, which led to their divine marriage
- Hinatuan Enchanted River – a sacred river believed to be protected by supernatural beings; the Surigaonon people believe that certain fishes in the river cannot be caught due to enchanted protection
- Kanlaon – a sacred volcano in Negros Island surrounded by a variety of myths; a story states that its vicinity was home to a nation ruled by Laon; it was also formerly home to a dragon-like monster which was slayed by the lovers, Kan, a youthful hero, and Laon, a king or datu in Negros; later stories say that the supreme goddess of the Hiligaynon people, Kanlaon, now lives in the volcano
- Agusan Marsh – an expansive sacred marsh believed to be the home of numerous celestial spirits; Lumads perform the panagtawag rituals so that a visitor would not be harmed in the marsh
- Biri – a sacred island with striking rock formations; the Waray people believe that Biri is the home of the goddess, Berbinota, who was initially a beautiful mortal woman who ruled the area's vicinity; stories say that enchanted beings kidnapped the mortal Berbinota in an attempt to make her their ruler, which eventually led to her enthronement as a goddess
- Mount Caimana – a sacred mountain for the Cuyunon people and is said to be the home of their supreme deity, Diwata ng Kagubatan; the Cuyunon used to perform a complex ritual for the deity on top of the mountain during her feast day prior to Spanish colonization
- Mount Iraya – a sacred mountain for the Ivatan people; there are two contrasting tales regarding the mountain, the first tale states that the mountain is a mother goddess (although Iraya was initially depicted as an androgynous deity prior to colonization) overlooking her children (the Ivatans) for their protection, while the second tale states that if a ring of clouds appear on top of the mountain, Iraya is notifying the people for preparation due to an inevitable death of an elder, usually due to natural causes
- Kalipung-awan – a sacred fishing ground for the people of Catanduanes and northeast Camarines Sur since ancient times; the indigenous name means "loneliness from an isolated place", referring to the feeling of fishermen who catch marine life in the area for days without their families; national culture refers to the place as Benham or Philippine Rise
- Langun-Gobingob Caves – a sacred cave system in Samar believed to be the home of ancient spirits and the resting ground of Waray people's souls; it is the second largest cave system in Asia
- Siquijor – the entire island province of Siquijor has been a sacred ground since ancient times due to its associated mystic traditions and sites; legend tells that the island rose from the sea after a strong earthquake
- Mount Kechangon – a sacred mountain in Lubuagan, Kalinga, which is the abode of the tinakchi, a race of mysterious and highly respected mountain-dwelling nature beings known as the "people who can't be seen"; some accounts tell that the tinakchi can use teleportation and invisibility, usually to safeguard nature and its wildlife
- Mount Pandadagsaan – a sacred mountain for many ethnic groups such as the Mandaya people in New Bataan, Compostela Valley; protected by a variety of nature deities; people who disturb the area or go there without divine permission are said to lose their way and succumb to the mountains.
- Romblon – the islands of Romblon is home to multiple sacred caves used by the ancestors of the ethnic Asi, Onhan, and Romblomanon peoples; the most notable of which is Ipot Cave on the island of Banton, where the oldest warp ikat textile in Southeast Asia was found
- Kamhantik – a sacred site in Quezon province filled with unique limestone coffins made between 890–1030 AD; locals believe that the limestone tombs and associated objects were made by forest deities; the site was looted by the Americans before proper archaeological research was conducted
- Sabuluag – islands east of Iloilo that are known for its sacred caves, remains of ancient ancestors, and enchanted and unseen beings lurking throughout the islands; created by the primordial giants Ilohaylo and Necrosamo in Hiligaynon mythology; during Spanish colonization, huge human bones were found on Bakwitan cave, which led to the island groups' name change into "Islas de Gigantes"
- Mount Makiling – a sacred mountain in southern Luzon, believed to be the abode of Makiling, a goddess sent by Tagalog supreme deity Bathala to aid mankind in the area; the mountain is highly associated with the gifts of nature; due to its importance, various religious sects have made the mountain an annual pilgrimage site
- Mount Mantalingajan – a sacred mountain revered by the local ethnic groups as the "mountain of the gods" in southern Palawan; an ancient race known as Tau't Daram (People of the Night) is believed to have lived in the mountain's forest canopies, told by the people's chants which refer to the race as "the shadows"
- Mount Lantoy – a sacred mountain in southern Cebu, believed to be the abode of the goddess Cacao, who lives in a cave and maintains a plantation-of-sort within the mountain; the goddess is said to sell her produce by sailing her golden ship from a nearby river onto the sea
- Ticao – an island in east Masbate, which is home to thousands of artifacts, including ancient human teeth, burial jars, ceramics, accessories, ancient stone inscriptions, cave petrographs, and cave petrogylphs; the island's cultural landscapes, notably its caves, are believed to be the home of a variety of nature spirits of the land, while its waters are filled with manta rays and sea spirits
- Punta Flechas – a sacred landmass at the end of Zamboanga del Sur; the Iranun people believed that the site is the home of spirits who beat the waves, making it harder to sail; arrows are shot onto the rocks of the area as offerings to the spirits; during the colonization era, the Spanish plucked roughly 4,000 arrows at the site and renamed the area as San Agustin's cape, fueling outrage from the Iranun

== Desecration of sacred sites ==
Majority of the sacred shrines and grounds under the indigenous Philippine folk religions have historically been desecrated by those belonging to Abrahamic faiths, namely, Christianity and Islam, and by the efforts of colonization and religious missionaries, as well as their followers.

Various indigenous sacred sites, including shrines and mountain sites, were desecrated by early Muslim missionaries and converts in the Sulu archipelago and western Mindanao. When the Spanish colonized the archipelago, majority of the indigenous sacred sites from Luzon, Visayas, and Mindanao were either desecrated or destroyed. Crosses were disrespectfully put up in sacred areas while sacred objects were removed and destroyed, while the colonizers burned down the sacred sites of the locals. Many sacred mountains, lakes, and islands were renamed by the colonizers, and some, such as the case of Mount San Cristobal, was demonized heavily, despite these areas having sacred origins.

In the modern age, desecrating of sacred sites in the indigenous Philippine folk religions continue to occur. Some include the setting up of Christian crosses on sacred mountains, such as in Mount Kabunian in Bakun, the illegal logging such as in the case of Mount Data in Benguet, destructive mining of sacred mountains such as the current activities conducted by mining firms, and the renaming of indigenous sites from their original local names into an English or Spanish name, some have been renamed to falsely refer to them as demonic.

== Restoration of indigenous shrines and sacred grounds ==
Today's practices are notably influenced by modernity, due to an array of inevitable religious dynamisms. Although no expansive shrine structures have yet to be built, natural shrines such as Mount Makiling, Mayon Volcano, Pinatubo Volcano, Mount Pulag, Kanlaon Volcano, Mount Madja-as, Mount Apo, and many others are thoroughly used to preserve the ancient religions. Home altars continue to be one of the abodes of specific sacred objects depicting or attributed to the deities and ancestral spirits.

== See also ==
- Diwata
- Animism
- Bathala
- Indigenous religious beliefs of the Philippines
- Indigenous religious beliefs of the Tagalog people
- Philippine mythology
- Philippine Registry of Cultural Property
- Religion in pre-colonial Philippines
- Sacred groves
- Sacred trees
- Dap-ay
