= Calbiga =

Municipality in Samar, Philippines

- Municipality
- Municipality of Calbiga
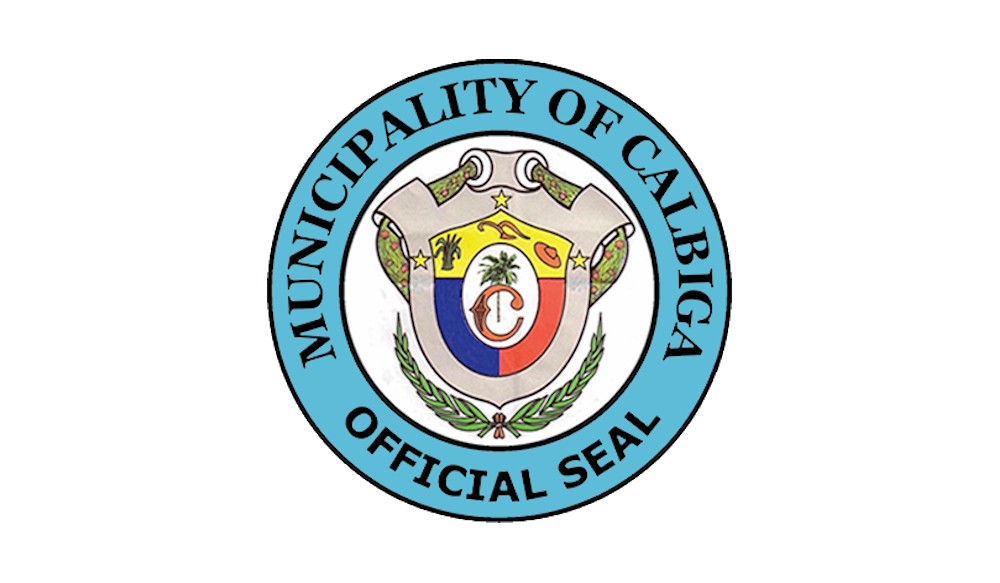
- Flag
- Etymology: Calviva
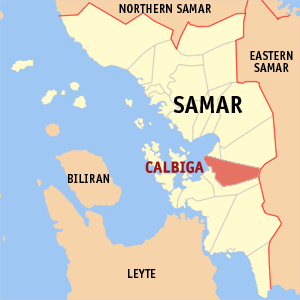
- Map of Samar with Calbiga highlighted
- Interactive map of Calbiga
- Location within the Philippines
- Coordinates: 11°38′N 125°01′E
- Country: Philippines
- Region: Eastern Visayas
- Province: Samar
- District: 2nd district
- Barangays: 41 (see Barangays)

Government
  - Type: Sangguniang Bayan
  - Mayor: Melchor F. Nacario
  - Vice Mayor: Eva L. Castillo
  - Representative: Reynolds Michael Tan
  - Councilors: List: • Gilda J. Marino; • Ma. Magina L. Ocenar; • Mary Ann B. Yadao; • Andrew C. Abelido; • Raymond D. Bordo; • Miguel C. Cabornay; • Red L. Nacario; • Rizalito J. Tan; DILG Masterlist of Officials
  - Electorate: 18,174 voters (2025)

Area
  - Total: 283.70 km^{2} (109.54 sq mi)
- Elevation: 56 m (184 ft)
- Highest elevation: 340 m (1,120 ft)
- Lowest elevation: 0 m (0 ft)

Population (2024 census)
  - Total: 23,309
  - Density: 82.161/km^{2} (212.80/sq mi)
  - Households: 5,589

Economy
  - Income class: 2nd municipal income class
  - Poverty incidence: 29.5% (2023)
  - Revenue: ₱ 18.3 million (2024)
  - Assets: ₱ 50.12 million (2024)
  - Expenditure: ₱ 20.1 million (2024)
  - Liabilities: ₱ 15.54 million (2024)

Service provider
  - Electricity: Samar 2 Electric Cooperative (SAMELCO 2)
- Time zone: UTC+8 (PST)
- ZIP code: 6715
- PSGC: 0806004000
- IDD : area code: +63 (0)55
- Native languages: Waray; Tagalog

Calbiga, officially the Municipality of Calbiga (Waray: Bungto han Calbiga; Tagalog: Bayan ng Calbiga), is a municipality in the province of Samar, Philippines. According to the 2024 census, it has a population of 23,309 people.

The town is famous for the Langun-Gobingob Caves which is the largest cave system in the Philippines, reputed to be the second largest in Asia and the world's third largest karst formation.

== History ==
In 1649, Calbiga was an annex or visita of Catbalogan; later in 1768, Calbiga was transferred to the jurisdiction of Umauas. All through Jesuit times, Calbiga remained a visita until 1772, when it had its first residential pastor, the Franciscan Fray Miguel Rico (de Jesus), O.F.M.. Calbiga was constituted as a separate unit under the advocacy of the Anunciacion.

In 1803, Fray Juan Caballero de Brozas, O.F.M. built a wooden church but in 1808, a typhoon destroyed this church and was rebuilt by the same Fray Brozas. By 1840, Brozas's second church was in bad state.

In 1853, Fray Francisco Moreno de Montalbanejo. O.F.M. had gathered enough material for a stone church. However, Redondo (1884, 217) that the church was wood roofed with thatch.

The Jesuits left no permanent architectural imprint in the town.

The present barrio "Binongto-an (meaning, "once a town) was the original Calbiga settlement. Legend - as recorded by Atty. Singzon - has it that the people of Calbiga originated from two brothers, Calpis and Bituan. Bituan established a village near the mouth of the river while Calpis stayed upstream the exact location of the town today. The descendants of Bituan later abandoned the coastal village to join the descendants of Calpis.

The territory now comprising Pinabacdao was once part of Calbiga, since its annexation in 1903 while the still-undivided Samar was reorganized, until its reorganization as a separate municipality in July 1946.

== Geography ==
=== Barangays ===
Calbiga is politically subdivided into 41 barangays. Each barangay consists of puroks and some have sitios.

- Antol
- Bacyaran
- Beri
- Barobaybay
- Binanggaran
- Borong
- Bulao
- Buluan
- Caamlongan
- Calayaan
- Calingonan
- Canbagtic
- Canticum
- Daligan
- Guimbanga
- Hindang
- Hubasan
- Literon
- Lubang
- Mahangcao
- Macaalan
- Malabal
- Minata
- Otoc
- Panayuran
- Pasigay
- Patong
- Barangay 1 (Poblacion)
- Barangay 2 (Poblacion)
- Barangay 3 (Poblacion)
- Barangay 4 (Poblacion)
- Barangay 5 (Poblacion)
- Barangay 6 (Poblacion)
- Barangay 7 (Poblacion)
- Polangi
- Rawis
- San Ignacio
- San Mauricio
- Sinalangtan
- Timbangan
- Tinago

=== Climate ===
Climate data for Calbiga, Samar
Month	Jan	Feb	Mar	Apr	May	Jun	Jul	Aug	Sep	Oct	Nov	Dec	Year
Mean daily maximum °C (°F)	27 (81)	28 (82)	28 (82)	30 (86)	30 (86)	30 (86)	29 (84)	29 (84)	29 (84)	29 (84)	28 (82)	28 (82)	29 (84)
Mean daily minimum °C (°F)	22 (72)	22 (72)	22 (72)	23 (73)	24 (75)	24 (75)	24 (75)	24 (75)	24 (75)	24 (75)	23 (73)	23 (73)	23 (74)
Average precipitation mm (inches)	114 (4.5)	81 (3.2)	94 (3.7)	81 (3.2)	119 (4.7)	192 (7.6)	186 (7.3)	158 (6.2)	167 (6.6)	185 (7.3)	202 (8.0)	176 (6.9)	1,755 (69.2)
Average rainy days	18.6	14.7	16.8	17.8	22.3	25.9	27.5	26.2	26.6	27.0	24.6	22.3	270.3
Source: Meteoblue (Use with caution: this is modeled/calculated data, not measured locally.)

== Demographics ==
Population census of Calbiga
Year	Pop.	±% p.a.
1903	5,399	—
1918	10,153	+4.30%
1939	14,071	+1.57%
1948	15,591	+1.15%
1960	12,868	−1.59%
1970	16,364	+2.43%
1975	14,697	−2.13%
1980	14,201	−0.68%
1990	17,116	+1.88%
1995	18,070	+1.02%
2000	18,890	+0.96%
2007	20,309	+1.00%
2010	21,434	+1.98%
2015	22,982	+1.34%
2020	23,310	+0.30%
2024	23,309	−0.00%
Source: Philippine Statistics Authority

== Economy ==
Poverty incidence of Calbiga (%)

Source: Philippine Statistics Authority

== Tourism ==
Langun-Gobingob Caves (Barangay Panayuran): The largest cave system in the Philippines, reputed to be the second largest in Asia and the world's third largest karst formation, is 7 km. long with an area of 900 square km. The area is composed of at least 12 interconnected caves. Locals believe that the caves are home to ancient primordial spirits and the spirits of Waray ancestors, making the caves one of the most sacred zones in Samar.

Lulugayan Falls and Rapids (Barangay Literon): Hundreds of waterfalls cascade down the 14-kilometer rapids from the source at Lake Kalidongan to the Calbiga River. The most majestic and panoramic is the Lulugayan Falls at Barangay Literon Correche. Approximately fifty meters wide, Lulugayan Falls has been dubbed by tourists as a Mini Niagara.

Kalidongan Lake (Barangay Caamlongan): The eternal spring—the mythical crater-like lake, 90–100 meters in diameter, lined with clean white limestone. Its clear, fresh water endlessly flows down the rapids, onto the Calbiga River and Maqueda Bay.

Maqueda Bay and Mangrove Forests: The richest spawning grounds in Eastern Visayas for Fish and crustaceans and one of the pillars of the island's economy.

Calbiga River: The river is the town's thriving lifeline. Small bancas daily go upstream and loaded with native merchandise. It serves 17 barangays as transport byway and water source.

Kanyawa Caves (Barangay Caamlongan): A little farther to the east is another huge caves system recently explored by French and Italian spelunkers. The caves system consists of fifteen galleries of distinctive features and underground rivers, and numerous stalactites and stalagmites.

Children's Play Area and Nature Park (Barangay Bacyaran): The first phase of the Calbiga Nature Park will also include a Visitor Center, Multi-purpose Pavilion, Amphitheater, Boardwalk and many more.

== Culture ==
=== The Calbiga Fiesta ===
The Evangelization of Calbiga When the Jesuits established missions in the island of Samar in 1696, Calbiga was served as a visita by the Jesuit resident mission in Umauas. In 1768, the Franciscans took over the administration of Samar and. Soon after, in 1771, Calbiga was established as a parish appointing Fray Miguel Rico (de Jesus), O.F.M. as the first cura paroco. For lack of missionaries. Umauas was joined to Calbiga until separated by a decree on March 12, 1863, giving Umauas its present name, Villa-Real.

The Original Patrona Calbiga was then under the patronage of Nuestra Señora de los Angeles (Our Lady, Queen of the Angels) and the town's special feast day was celebrated on August 2 even at the original settlement, Binongtoan, at the mouth of the Calbiga River. The transfer of the seacoast villagers to the upper part of the river, based on legend, was related to the miracles of the Virgin. Here's a Portion of the report submitted to the Historical Commission by the Alcalde Mayor Perfecto Hacbang in 1938: “We also have a sample of unexplained happenings as follows: at the time when the town was still in the place of Binongto-an, the patron saint, then Nuestra Señora de los Angeles, would disappear from its site and was always found afterwards in the place where the town is located today. It was one of the main reasons why the people moved to this town.” This story was corroborated by historian-writer Atty. Filomeno Singzon in his article La Historia de la Virgen de la Anuncacion. The original wooden image of Nuestra Señora de los Angeles had a special niche beside the altar even after the antique church was demolished and replaced by concrete structure in the mid-Sixties, but during the finishing touches of its interiors, the “miraculous” image, together with some precious relics, the other santos, the silver candelabra, the other intricate wood carvings and the other “antiques” disappeared, never to be seen again.

From Nuestra Señora de los Angeles to Nuestra Señora de la Anuncacion When Fray Juan Caballero de Brozas, O.F.M. built a strong wooden church in 1803, he dedicated it to Nuestra Senora de la Anuncacion (Our Lady of the Annunciation) whose feast day falls on March 25. But the Calbiganons continued to venerate the image of Nuestra Señora de los Angeles until it was replaced by a new image of a kneeling virgin with the Archangel Gabriel, during the hermanidad of Señora Mamerta Quimbo Abellar de Singzon sometime after the church was built and dedicated to Nuestra Señora de la Anuncacion in 1803.

== Education ==
- Calbiga Western Samar College
- Calbiga National High School
- Calbiga Central Elementary School
- there are also other complete elementary and primary schools in some barangays.

== Notable personalities ==
- Esteban Singson – Philippine senator from the 9th District (1916 – 1922)
