= Maria Makiling =

Spirit in Philippine mythology

- Protector of Mt. Makiling
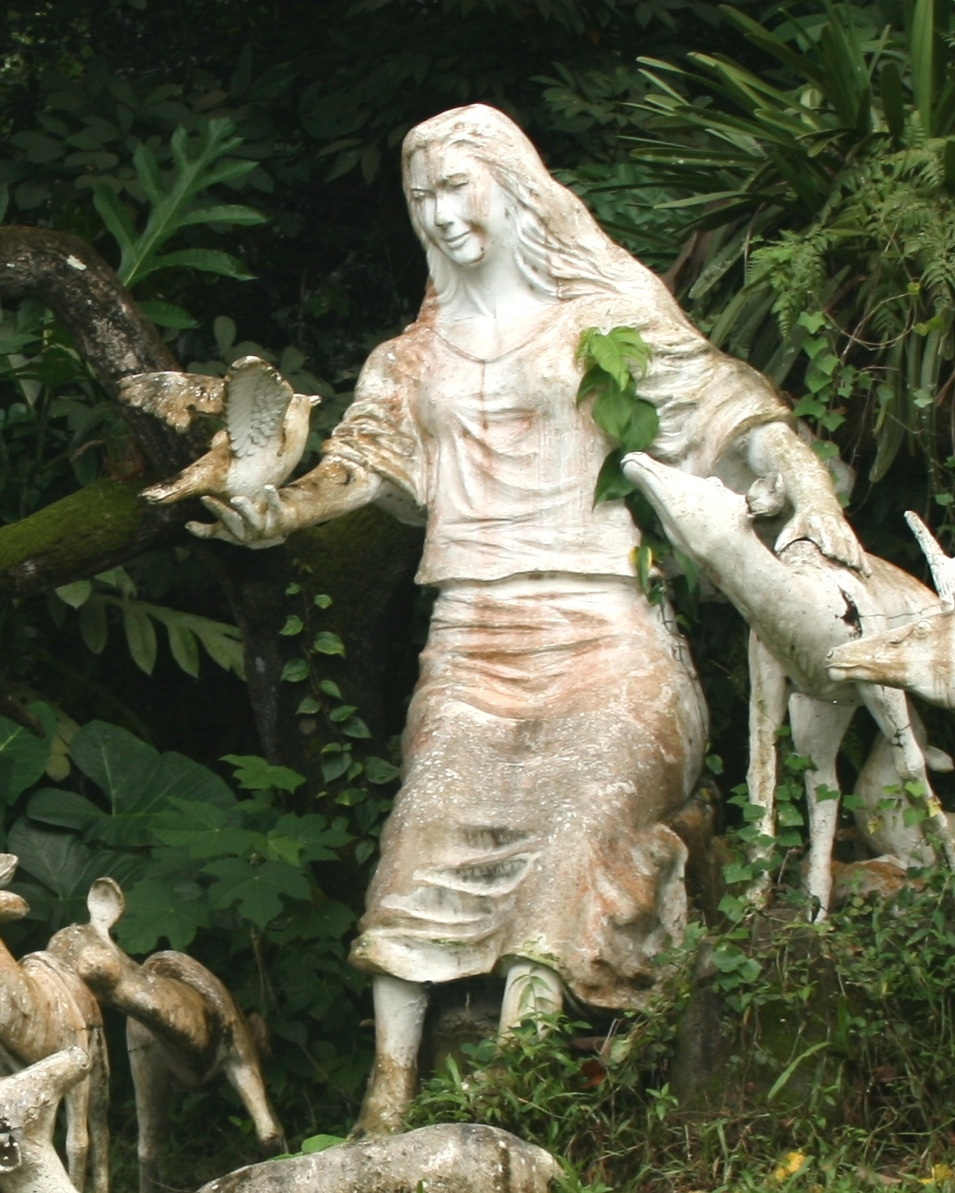
- Statue of Maria Makiling at the University of the Philippines Los Baños
- Gender: Female
- Region: Philippines

María Makiling, more properly Mariang Makiling, is a diwata in Philippine mythology, associated with Mount Makiling in Laguna, Philippines. She is the most widely known diwatà (deity) or lambana (fairy) in Philippine mythology and was venerated in pre-colonial Philippines as the goddess Dayang Masalanta or Dian Masalanta, invoked to stop deluges, storms, and earthquakes.

Maria Makiling is the guardian spirit of the mountain, responsible for protecting its bounty and thus is also a benefactor for the townspeople who depend on the mountain's resources. In addition to being a guardian of the mountain, some legends also identify Laguna de Bay—and the fish caught from it—as part of her domain. She was sent by Bathalà to aid the people of the area in their everyday life.

Mount Makiling resembles the profile of a woman, said to be María herself. This phenomenon is described as true from several different perspectives, so there is no single location associated with this claim. The mountain's various peaks are said to be María's face and two breasts, respectively, and her hair cascades downwards a gentle slope away from her body.

María Makiling is a prominent example of the mountain goddesses motif across Philippine mythology, others being María Sinukuan of Pampanga's Mount Arayat and María Cacao on Cebu's Mount Lantoy.

== Etymology ==
Legends do not clarify whether this spirit was named after the mountain or the mountain was named after her. The evolution of the name, however, presents some clues.

=== "Maria" or "Dayang": "the lady" ===
The name "Mariang Makiling" is the Spanish-Tagalog contraction of "Maria ng Makiling" (Maria of Makiling), or else a Spanish-Tagalog formulation where "Makiling" is an adjective to "Maria" (i.e. Maria who is Makiling). The term is a Hispanicized evolution of an alternate name for the Diwata, "Dayang Makiling"-"dayang" being an Austronesian word meaning "princess" or "noble lady". Prior to the conversion of the natives to Christianity, Maria Makiling was already known as Makiling, an anito sent by Bathala in Mount Makiling to aid mankind in their daily tasks. The "Maria" was added by the Spanish in a bid to rebrand her as Catholic, after the Virgin Mary.

Professor Grace Odal of the University of the Philippines believes there is a significant link between Maria Makiling and the mythical woman (Ba'i) for whom the town of Bay and the lake of Laguna de Bay are named. When the lady of the lake also became associated with the nearby mountain, the common description of her became that of the "lady of the mountain".

=== Makiling: "crooked" or "bent" ===
As for the word "Makiling", it has been noted that the mountain rises from Laguna de Bay "to a rugged top and breaks into irregular hills southward, thus 'leaning' or 'uneven.'" The Tagalog word for "leaning" or "uneven" is "makiling". This corresponds with the common belief that the profile of the mountain resembles that of a reclining woman, from certain angles.

A less often mentioned possible origin for the name of the mountain is that the name describes the mountain as having plenty of the bamboo variety known as "kawayang kiling" (Bambusa vulgaris schrad). By this etymology, the mountain would have been named after the bamboo and the lady named after the mountain.

== Appearance ==
Descriptions of Maria Makiling are fairly consistent. She is a breathtakingly beautiful young woman who never ages. Lanuza describes her as having "light olive skin, long shining black hair, and twinkling eyes."

It is said that the abundance and serenity of the enchanted mountain complements Maria's own persona.

She is also closely associated with the white mist that often surrounds the mountain. While in just a few stories either her skin or hair is white, in most tales, it is her radiant clothing which makes people who have seen her think that perhaps they just saw a wisp of cloud through the trees and mistook it for Maria.

== Home on the mountain ==
Unlike Maria Sinukuan and Maria Cacao who live in caves in their respective mountains, Makiling is often described as living in a humble hut.

In some stories, this hut is situated in the village, among the people, where Maria Makiling lived before she fled to the mountains after having been offended for some reason.

In other stories, the hut is up in the mountain and can only be found if one is allowed by Maria to find it.

== Legends of Maria Makiling ==
Because stories about Maria Makiling were part of oral tradition long before they were documented, there are numerous versions of the Maria Makiling legend.

=== Superstitions about Maria Makiling ===
One superstition is that every so often, men would disappear into the forests of the mountain. It is said that Makiling has fallen in love with that particular man and has taken him to her house to be her husband, to spend his days in matrimonial bliss. Another superstition says that one can go into the forests and pick and eat any fruits one might like, but never carry any of them home. In doing so, one runs the risk of angering Maria Makiling. One would get lost and be beset by insect stings and thorn pricks. The only solution is to throw away the fruit and then to reverse one's clothing as evidence to Maria that one is no longer carrying any of her fruit.

=== Turning ginger into gold ===
Perhaps the most common of the longer stories concerning the diwata is how she turns ginger into gold to help humans. In these stories, María’s abode was still known to nearby villagers with whom she regularly interacted. The villager in centre of such narratives is often either a mother seeking a cure for her ill child, or a husband seeking a cure for his wife.

The wise Maria recognizes the symptoms as signs not of disease, but of starvation brought about by extreme poverty. She gives the villager in question some ginger, which is magically found to be gold back in the village.

In versions where the villager is a man returning to his ill wife, he unwisely discards some of the magical ginger because it had become too heavy to carry.

Some versions have the humans love her all the more for her act of kindness. In other tellings, greedy villagers break into María's garden to see if her other plants are also gold. Distressed by this greed, María distances herself from the people by moving higher up the mountain, her pristine white garments indistinguishable from the clouds and mists which would wreathe the summit.

=== Spurned lover ===
In many other stories, Makiling is characterized as a spurned lover.

In one story, she fell in love with a hunter who had wandered into her kingdom. Soon the two became lovers, with the hunter coming up the mountain every day. They promised to love each other forever. When Maria discovered that he had met, fell in love with, and married a mortal woman, she was deeply hurt. Realizing that she could not trust townspeople because she was so different from them, and that they were just using her, she became angry and refused to give fruits to the trees, let animals and birds roam the forests for hunters to catch, and let fish abound in the lake. People seldom saw her, and those times when she could be seen were often only during pale moonlit nights.

In another version of the story, told by the Philippines' National Hero, Jose Rizal, Maria falls in love with a farmer, whom she then watches over. This leads the townspeople say he is endowed with a charm, or mutya, as it is called, that protected him from harm. The young man was good at heart and simple in spirit, but also quiet and secretive. In particular, he would not say much of his frequent visits into the wood of Maria Makiling. But then war came to the land, and army officers came recruiting unmarried young men. The man entered an arranged marriage so that he could stay safely in the village. A few days before his marriage, he visits Maria one last time. "I hope that you were devoted to me," she said sadly, "but you need an earthly love, and you do not have enough faith in me besides. I could have protected you and your family." After saying this, she disappeared. Maria Makiling was never seen by the peasants again, nor was her humble hut ever rediscovered.

=== The three suitors ===
Michelle Lanuza tells another version of the story, set during the later part of the Spanish occupation:

Maria was sought for and wooed by many suitors, three of whom were the Captain Lara, a Spanish soldier; Joselito, a Spanish mestizo studying in Manila; and Juan who was but a common farmer. Despite his lowly status, Juan was chosen by Maria Makiling.

Spurned, Joselito and Captain Lara conspired to frame Juan for setting fire to the cuartel of the Spanish. Juan was shot as the enemy of the Spaniards. Before he died, he cried Maria's name out loud.

The diwata quickly came down from her mountain while Captain Lara and Joselito fled to Manila in fear of Maria's wrath. When she learned what happened, she cursed the two, along with all other men who cannot accept failure in love.

Soon, the curse took effect. Joselito suddenly contracted an incurable illness. The revolutionary Filipinos killed Captain Lara.

"From then on," Lanuza concludes, "Maria never let herself be seen by the people again. Every time somebody gets lost on the mountain, they remember the curse of the diwata. Yet they also remember the great love of Maria Makiling."

=== War between Tagalogs and Kapampangans ===
Kapampangan mythology, however, has a lesser view of Dayang Makiling. Legend has it that Apung Suku, a prominent Kapampangan leader, heard reports of strange taga-ilog (river dwellers) trespassing and violating Kapampangan lands. These strange people cut down trees planted and harvested by the industrious Kapampangans. Apung Suku went to the trespassers and told them to flee. The trespassers threatened that they would return with an army led by their Dayang Makiling.

This threat passed when a navy of fast boats sped through the Pampanga River, and the taga-ilog ravaged the land. Apung Suku led men to dam the Pampanga River, reversing the flow and trapping the invaders. Dayang Makiling accepted that her army had lost, then surrendered. Henceforth, Apung Suku was known as Ápûng Sínukuan (literally "to whom one submits" in Pampangan), preserving the memory that the taga-ilog dayang surrendered to him.

In some versions of the legend, the dayang Makiling submitted herself to union with Ápûng Sínukuan. This reversed the historical Tagalog matriarchy, for now their dayang submitted to a Kapampangan chieftain with patriarchal trappings. Their three daughters all married mortal men, from where the Kapampangan people sprang forth.

== Modern sightings ==
Mount Makiling still abounds with superstitions and stories concerning Makiling. When people get lost on the mountain, the disappearances are still attributed to the diwata or to spirits who follow her.

A common story is that of a group of hikers who leave their camp dirty with human waste and empty cans and bottles. Searching for water, the hikers find themselves befuddled, coming back to the same place over and over again. Only after they cleaned their camp did they manage to find water.

In the University of the Philippines Los Baños, a university that sits on the foot of Mount Makiling, students still tell stories of a woman in white who is sighted walking down the long uphill road heading to the Upper (College of Forestry) Campus. Sometimes, the woman appears to be trying to hitch a ride down the mountain. Invariably, the observers are said to be frightened and just ignore the woman, believing her to be Maria Makiling.

The unusual weather patterns on the mountain area are also often attributed to Maria Makiling. Often this means sudden rains whenever particularly noisy events are held in the areas near the mountain. Locals say that the diwata does not approve of the event. Acclaimed stage and screen actor and director Behn Cervantes relates a reverse version of this legend, during the launching program for the UP Alumni Association's Maria Makiling Foundation, an advocacy group formed for the protection and conservation of Mount Makiling:

During our launch, we had a hair-raising experience. When the remarkable Dulce (singer) reached the climax of her song of praise to Nature, she raised her arms as though in veneration of Maria Makiling. As if on cue, golden leaves from surrounding trees showered the audience like petals from the heavens. The astounded crowd gasped and aahhed in unison. Los Baños' Dr. Portia Lapitan whispered to me, "The diwata approves."

== In art and popular culture ==
Maria Makiling is a common theme among Filipino artists, ranging from painters and sculptors to graphic novelists.

- One prominent depiction of Maria Makiling can be found on the Seal of the Municipality of Los Baños, Laguna. It depicts Maria makiling in the foreground with the mountain in the background and water (representing Laguna de Bay) at her feet.
- A statue of Maria Makiling was once put up in front of UPLB's main library. It depicts the diwata surrounded by various creatures of the forest, most noticeably a doe and some birds. The statue has since been replaced by that of the "Philippine Pegasus" or "Pegaraw". The original statue was moved to the road leading up to UPLB's College of Forestry, near the University Health Service.
- Another statue of Maria Makiling was once put up at the boundary of Los Baños and Calamba, on the boundary marker that identifies Los Baños as a "Special Science and Nature City". The statue has since been removed. That specific statue had been criticized by some members of Los Baños' religious sector because they said it glorified a territorial spirit. No official remark has been made, however, as to whether this complaint had anything to do with the removal of the statue.
- The most recently unveiled statue of Maria Makiling stands in UPLB's Alumni Plaza, sculpted by Filipino artist JunYee.
- Mariang Banga statue, UP Los Baños
  At least three other statues in the UPLB campus are associated with Makiling, although not explicitly stated to be statues of the goddess herself. The oldest is the reconstructed pre-war statue referred to as "Dalambanga" (literally meaning jar bearer) near the Molawin River, depicting a woman (sometimes interpreted as Makiling herself, and sometimes called "Maria Dalambanga") carrying a jar — a reference to the legend of how Calamba, Laguna got its name. Another is the "Mother Nature" statue that serves as the facade of the Ecosystems Research and Development Bureau in the upper campus. The other is Maria Pureza Escaño's 8-Foot Fiberglass Resin Sculpture "The Rose of Marya: Service through Excellence" intended as a "tribute to the women of UPLB who excel and serve."
- In Arnold Arre's graphic novel, Ang Mundo ni Andong Agimat, Maria Makiling is in love with a Katipunero (revolutionary). When her lover is killed by Zolgo, she loses her memory due to trauma. She wanders down to the city, with no clue on who she is. The graphic novel chronicles the efforts of the protagonists to find Maria and restore her memory.
- To celebrate the launching of the UPAA Maria Makiling Foundation, an advocacy group formed by the UP Alumni Association to promote conservation efforts of the mountain, the Foundation held the Mariang Makiling Ecological-Cultural Festival. A highlight of that event was what UPLB Chancellor Velasco described as a relauching of the image of Maria Makiling—modelled at the event by television star and singer Karylle. Says Renowned theater director and UPAA Board Public Relations Director Behn Cervantes: Karylle was chosen by the organizers for her graceful demeanor and sweet image, her expressive eyes, and her luxuriant wavy hair that typifies long-held descriptions of Maria Makiling.
- Maria Makiling features significantly in Karen Francisco's novel "Naermyth", a fantasy adventure novel set in a post-apocalyptic Philippines, where creatures of lore, folktales and the once-mythical waged a war that led to the human race's downfall. In the novel, the diwata are neutral in the war between men and naermyth, and Makiling is a major figure among them.
- The character "Salome" (played by Mara Lopez) in Vim Yapan's 2013 film "Debosyon" incorporates the legend of Mariang Makiling, along with other prominent diwata from Philippine myths, such as Mariang Sinukuan, linking them to the legends of Daragang Magayon and to the mythos of the Virgin of Peñafrancia. At one point in the script the character acknowledges herself as the personification of the mythical beings, Makiling named among them, throughout the Philippine archipelago.
- A fictionalized version of Makiling was portrayed in the 2018 television series Bagani by Maricar Reyes-Poon.
- Makiling is a 2024 Philippine television drama thriller series broadcast by GMA Network. series dedicated to the goddess, Makiling, Miss Universe Philippines 2020 Rabiya Mateo portrays Maria Makiling, the story is set in the Modern Times where Maria Makiling uses her supernatural powers to help those people suffering injustice at the hands of oppressors. She helps Elle Villanueva, playing the role of Amira, a girl whose family is a Faith Healer. She was being bullied from her Schooling years up until her adulthood. Myrtle Sarrosa plays Amira's bully, Portia
- Mga Kwentong Epik ni Maria Makiling the animated Filipino series in Netflix released on September 16, 2022. The six-episode series follows a young woman who discovers she is the goddess Maria Makiling, with Ryza Cenon voicing the lead character.

== See also ==
- Diwata
- Anito
- Fairy
- Kanlaon
- Mayon
- Mount Apo
- Pele (deity)
- Guayota
- List of Philippine mythological figures
