= Mount Makiling =

Inactive volcano in the Philippines

- Maquiling
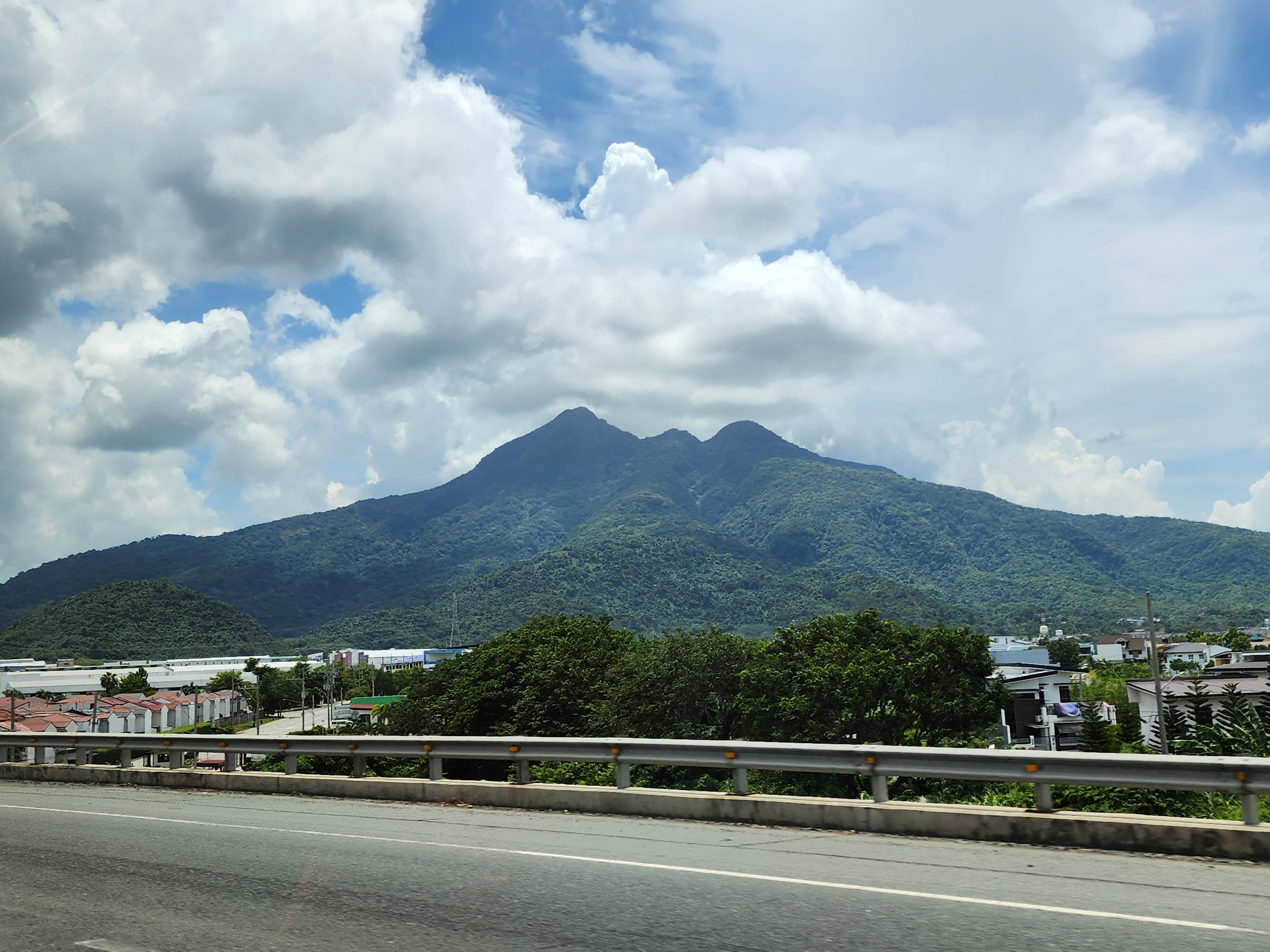
- Mount Makiling as seen from the South Luzon Expressway in Santo Tomas, Batangas

Highest point
- Elevation: 1,090 m (3,580 ft)
- Prominence: 968 m (3,176 ft)
- Listing: List of inactive volcanoes in the Philippines
- Coordinates: 14°08′N 121°12′E

Geography
- Location within Luzon Location within Philippines
- Country: Philippines
- Region: Calabarzon
- Province: Batangas; Laguna
- City/municipality: Bay; Calamba; Los Baños; Santo Tomas

Geology
- Mountain type: Stratovolcano
- Volcanic zone: Laguna Volcanic Field
- Last eruption: Holocene

Climbing
- Easiest route: from U.P. Los Baños

Mount Makiling (also spelled Maquiling) is an inactive stratovolcano located in the provinces of Laguna and Batangas on the island of Luzon in the Philippines. The mountain rises to an elevation of 1,090 meters (3,580 ft) above mean sea level and is the highest feature of the Laguna Volcanic Field. It is listed as a Stratovolcano of both the Laguna Volcanic Field and the separate Taal caldera by the Global Volcanism Program. The volcano has no recorded historic eruption but volcanism is still evident through geothermal features like mud spring and hot springs. South of the mountain is the Makiling–Banahaw Geothermal Plant. The Philippine Institute of Volcanology and Seismology (PHIVOLCS) classifies the volcano as "Inactive".

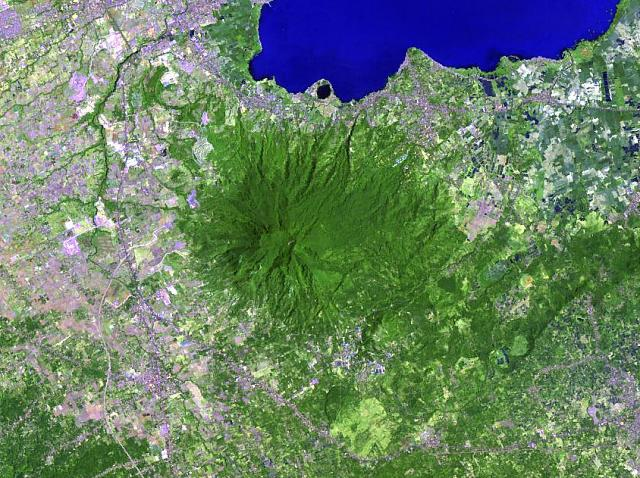
Satellite view of Mount Makiling

Mount Makiling is a state-owned forest reserve administered by the University of the Philippines Los Baños. Prior to its transfer to the university, the mountain was the first national park of the Philippines. Mount Makiling National Park was established on February 23, 1933, by Proclamation No. 552. However, it was decommissioned as a national park on June 20, 1963, by Republic Act No. 3523 when it was transferred to the university for use in forestry education and information.

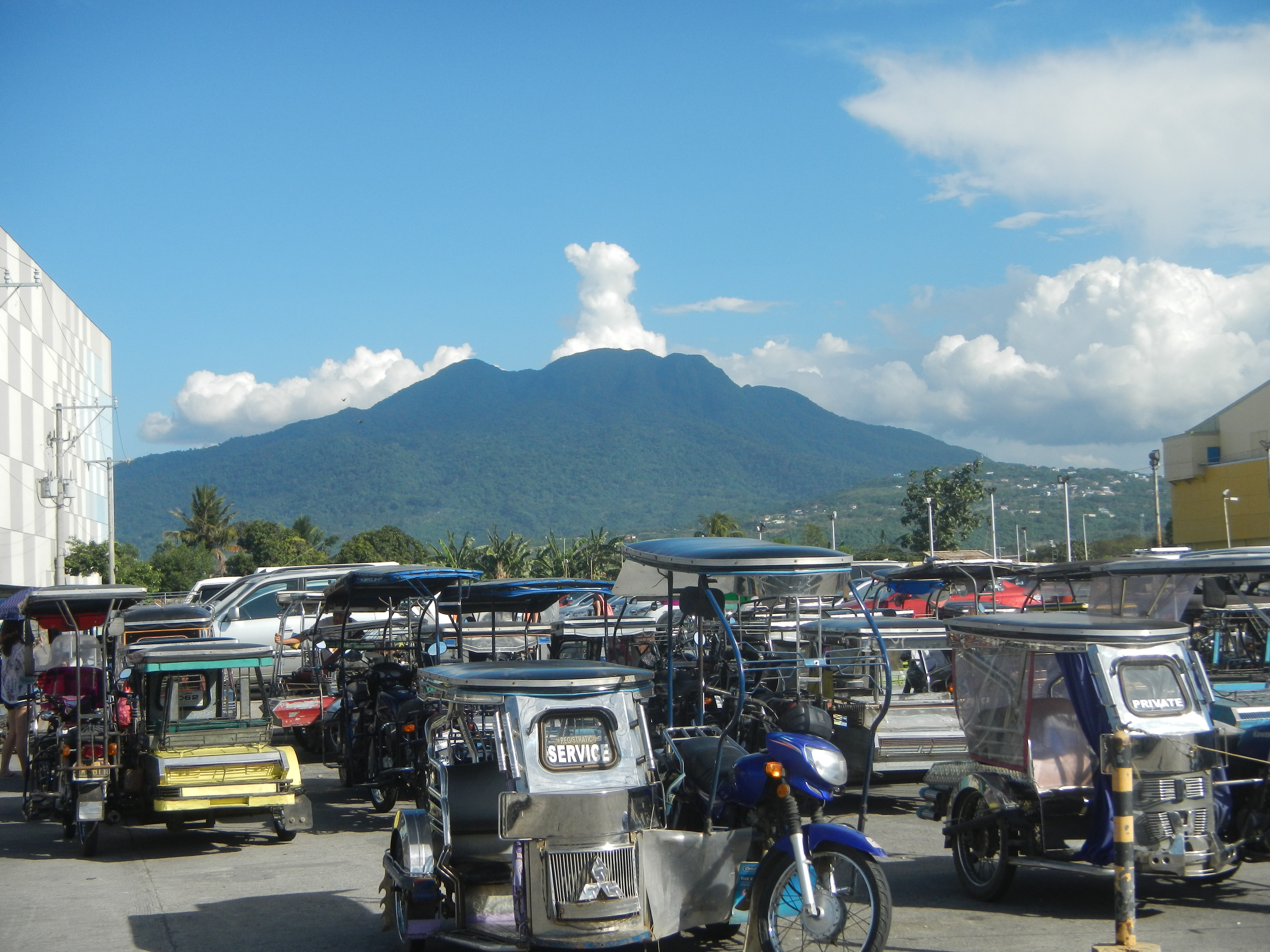
Mount Makiling as seen from Real, Calamba

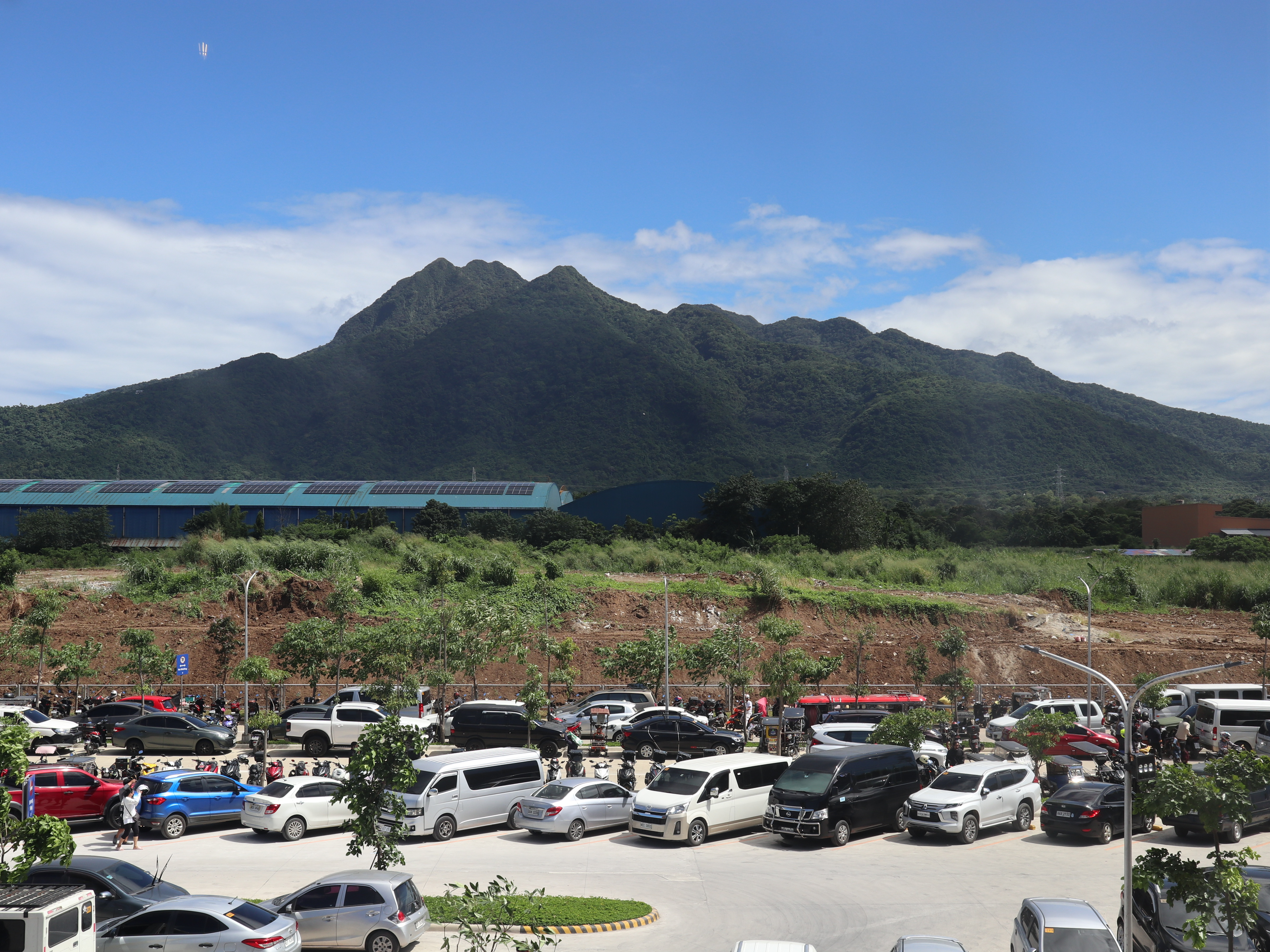
Mount Makiling's south face as seen from Santo Tomas, Batangas

The mountain is sacred to many pilgrims and is widely believed to be the home of the diwata named Maria Makiling. It is one of the most known bundok dambana in Calabarzon. It was declared as an ASEAN Heritage Park in 2013, with the title of "Mount Makiling Forest Reserve".

== Mythology and Legend ==
Maria Makiling was the protector and guardian of Mount Makiling. Thus, modern sightings of her were even reported. Maria Makiling is a common subject among Filipino artists, ranging from painters and sculptors to graphic novelists. Prior to the conversion of the natives to Christianity, Maria Makiling was already known as Makiling, a diwata sent by Bathala in Mount Makiling to aid mankind in their daily tasks. The 'Maria' was added by the Spanish in a bid to 'rebrand' her as Catholic and to further subjugate the natives into Spanish imperialism.

The contour of the mountain is said to be that of her in a reclining position. In some accounts, Maria Makiling, while serving as a diwata of Bathala in Mount Makiling, was heartbroken by a mortal man, and thus chose to remain hidden from mortal view thereafter.

== History ==
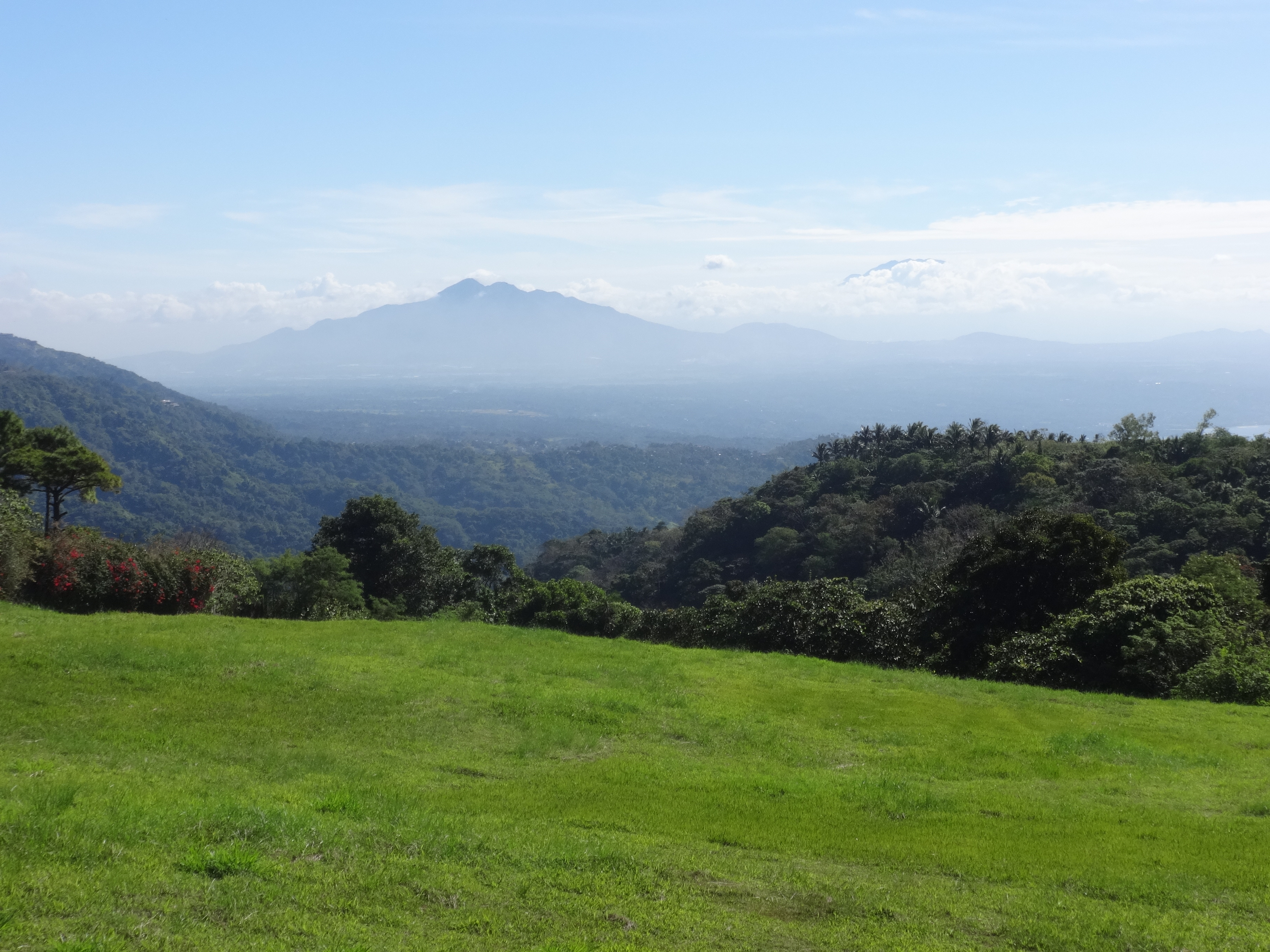
Mount Makiling (left-center) as viewed from Tagaytay

The following are the proclamations, Republic Acts, and Executive Orders relevant to the Makiling Forest Reserve (MFR):

- Proclamation No. 106 (1910) – Makiling Forest Reserve was established with specific boundaries and placed under the Bureau of Forestry by Governor General William Cameron Forbes to regulate the use of public forest and forest reserves in the Philippines; Makiling Forest Reserve was set aside for the purpose of establishing a forest school and for silvicultural studies.
- Proclamation No. 60 (1920) – The reserved was renamed Makiling National Botanic Gardens and placed under the Bureau of Forestry by Proclamation No. 60 issued by Governor-General Francis Burton Harrison primary for scientific studies on plants and animals.
- Proclamation No. 552 (1933) – The reserved was renamed the Makiling National Park under the Bureau of Forestry issued by Governor-General Theodore Roosevelt Jr. to serve as game refuge and for other purposes for the benefit and enjoyment of the people.
- Proclamation No. 214 (1937) – Calamba Estate block was added to the Park for forest purposes issued by President Manuel L. Quezon.
- Republic Act (RA) 826 (1952) – Transfer of the administration of the Makiling National Park from the Bureau of Forestry to the Commission of Parks and Wildlife in order to promote effectual planning, development, maintenance and conservation of all national parks, monuments and wildlife in the country.
- Proclamation No. 692 (1960) – Administration of the Makiling National Park was transferred from the Commission of Parks and Wildlife to the University of the Philippines (UP) issued by President Carlos P. Garcia for forestry education and research purposes of the College of Forestry, subject to the condition that said land will be conserved and preserved as a national park.
- Republic Act (RA) 3523 (1963) – The Makiling National park was disestablished and then ceded, transferred and conveyed to UP issued by Pres. Diosdado Macapagal to serve as the land resource for carrying out a program of public education and information in forestry, with end goal of promoting general public appreciation of forest values.
- Executive Order (EO) 224 (1987) – Complete jurisdiction, control and regulation of watershed areas including the Makiling Forest Reserve was given to the National Power Corporation (NPC) issued by President Corazon Aquino in support of the country's major program of energy development.
- Republic Act (RA) 6967 (1990) – Administration of the Makiling Forest Reserve was finally transferred to UPLB by President Corazon C. Aquino primarily as a training laboratory for the advancement of scientific and technical knowledge on the preservation, conservation and development of forest, flora and fauna and natural resources.
- Executive Order 121 (1994) – created a Presidential Commission on Laguna Lake and Mt. Makiling Development to address urgent problems affecting the resources and to formulate a master plan for the development of the lake and the reserve which are seen as integrated ecosystems.

== Places of interest ==
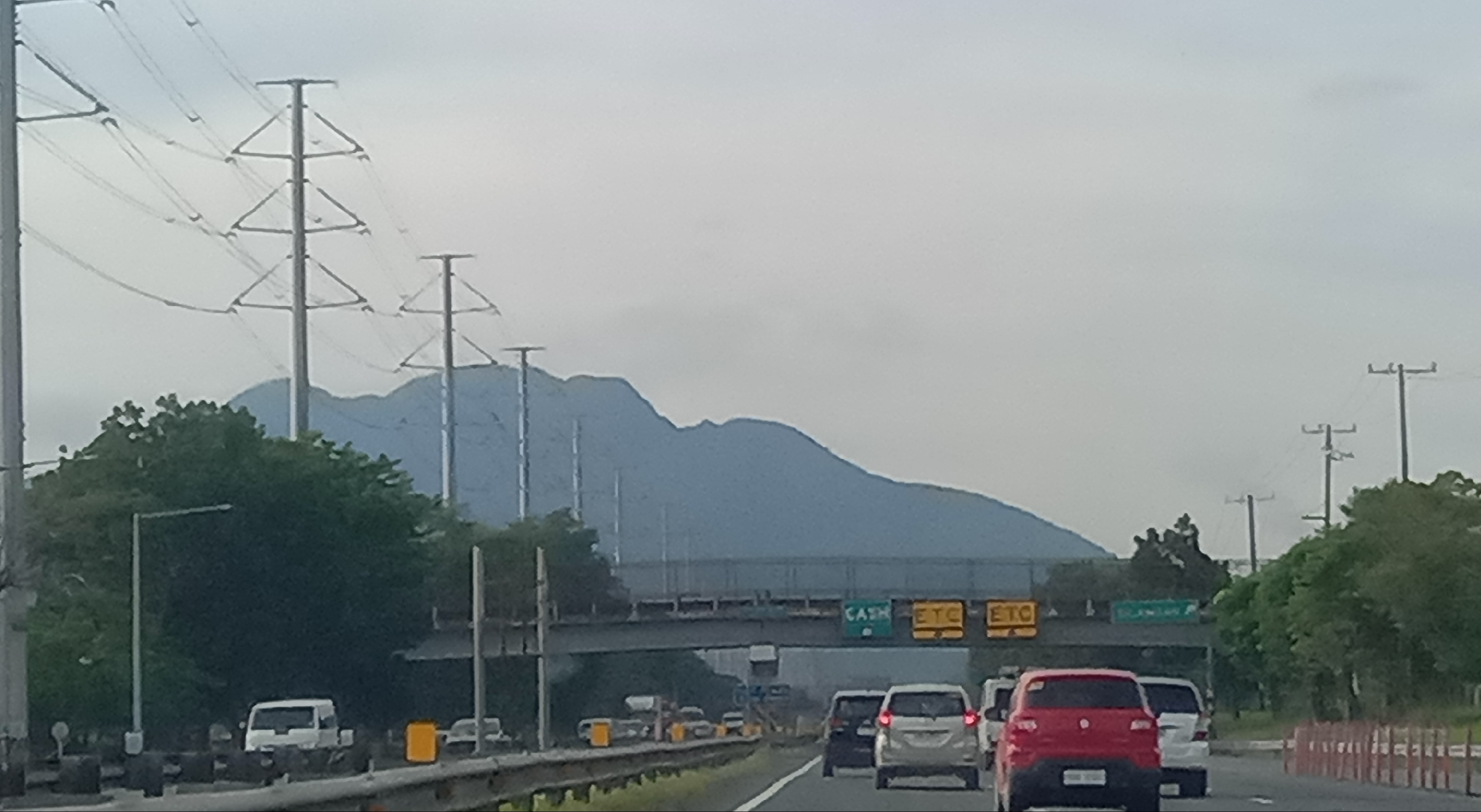
Mount Makiling's north face as seen heading south towards South Luzon Expressway's Calamba Exit

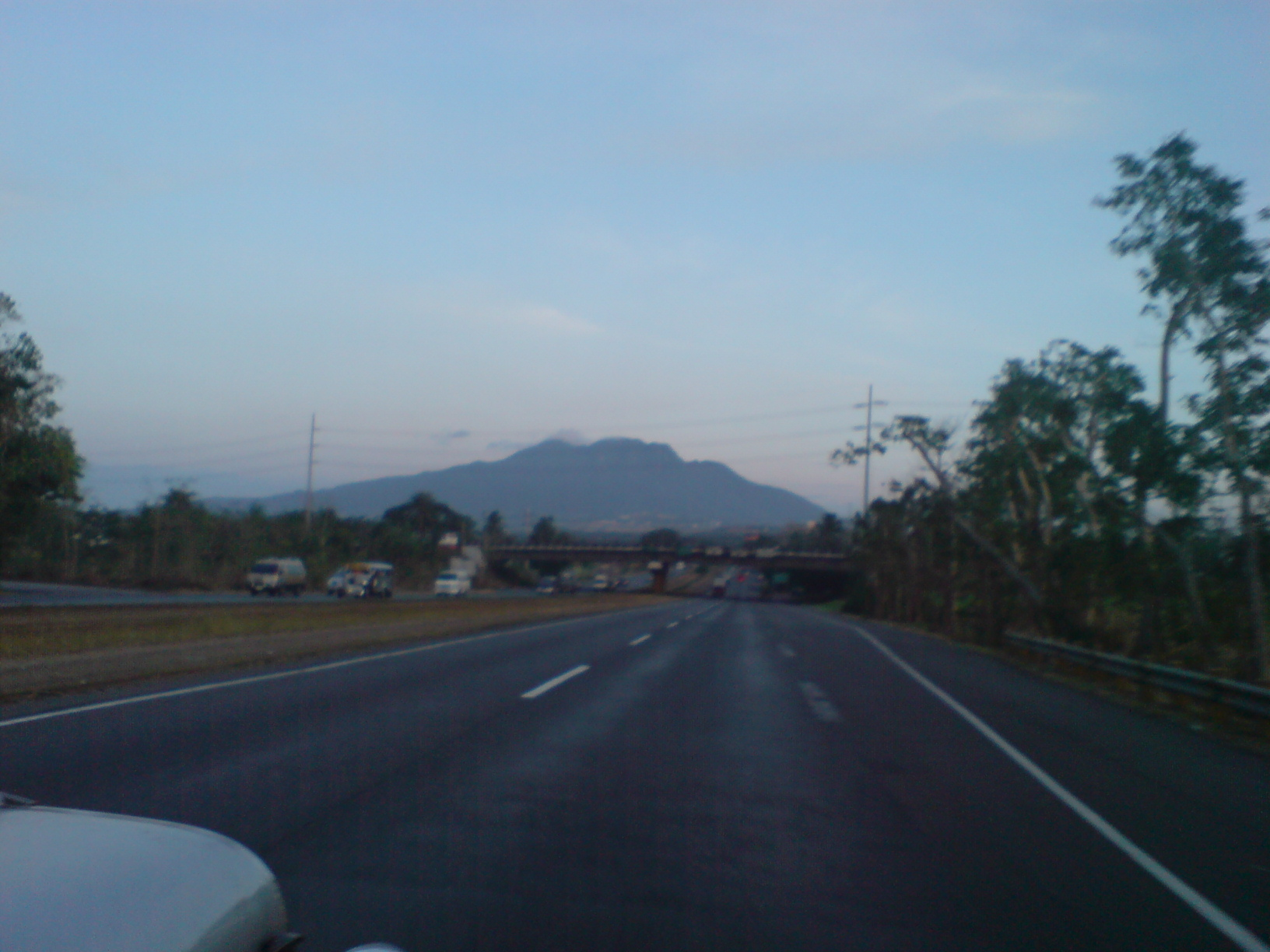
Mount Makiling's north face as also seen heading south towards South Luzon Expressway's Calamba exit in 2007, prior to the completion of its rehabilitation work

- Makiling National Scout Reservation, a campsite at the foot of Mount Makiling adjacent to U.P. Los Baños, which is being managed by the Boy Scouts of the Philippines this is the site of the 10th World Scout Jamboree in 1959 and 26th Asia-Pacific Regional Jamboree in 2009 and 2010.
- Mud Springs, a place which was known as Natugnos, is widely accepted albeit erroneously as the volcanic crater of Mount Makiling
- National Arts Center, a patch of land at the foot of Mount Makiling adjacent to U.P. Los Baños, which is being managed by the Cultural Center of the Philippines and the site of the Philippine High School for the Arts, a special school for young artist scholars
- Pook ni Maria Makiling, now closed, was an eco-tourism site adjacent to the Jamboree Site, National Arts Center and U.P. Los Baños
- University of the Philippines, Los Baños

== Geographical features ==
=== Subwatersheds ===
- Molawin-Dampalit
- Cambantoc
- Greater Sipit
- Tigbi

=== Rivers and creeks ===
- Munting River — Santo Tomas
- Siam-Siam Creek — Calamba
- Sipit Creek — Calamba
- Pansipit Creek — Calamba
- Pansol Creek — Calamba
- Dampalit River — Los Baños
- Saran Creek — Los Baños
- Pili Creek — Los Baños
- Molawin Creek — Los Baños
- Maitim River — Bay
- Calo River — Bay

=== Maars ===
- Alligator Lake, Los Baños 14°10′57″N 121°12′23″E

=== Cones ===
Named as hills

- La Mesa Hill, Calamba 14°8′56.7″N 121°9′50.5″E
- Mayondon Hill, Los Baños 14°11′44.9″N 121°14′16.9″E
- Sison Hill, Los Baños

Named as mountains

- Mount Bijiang, Calamba 14°9′41.5″N 121°9′58.4″E
- Mount Camotes, Calamba 14°9′43.6″N 121°9′8.2″E
- Mount Masaia, Calamba 14°9′12.0″N 121°9′21.4″E
- Mount Cabulugan, Bay 14°7′6.2″N 121°12′50″E
- Mount Buboy, Calauan 14°05′47.0″N 121°14′36.9″E
- Mount Bulalo, Calauan 14°6′4.5″N 121°13′34.5″E
- Mount Tamlong, Calauan 14°4′55.7″N 121°14′26.7″E
- Mount Olila, Alaminos 14°04′40.2″N 121°12′52.1″E

== Hiking activity ==
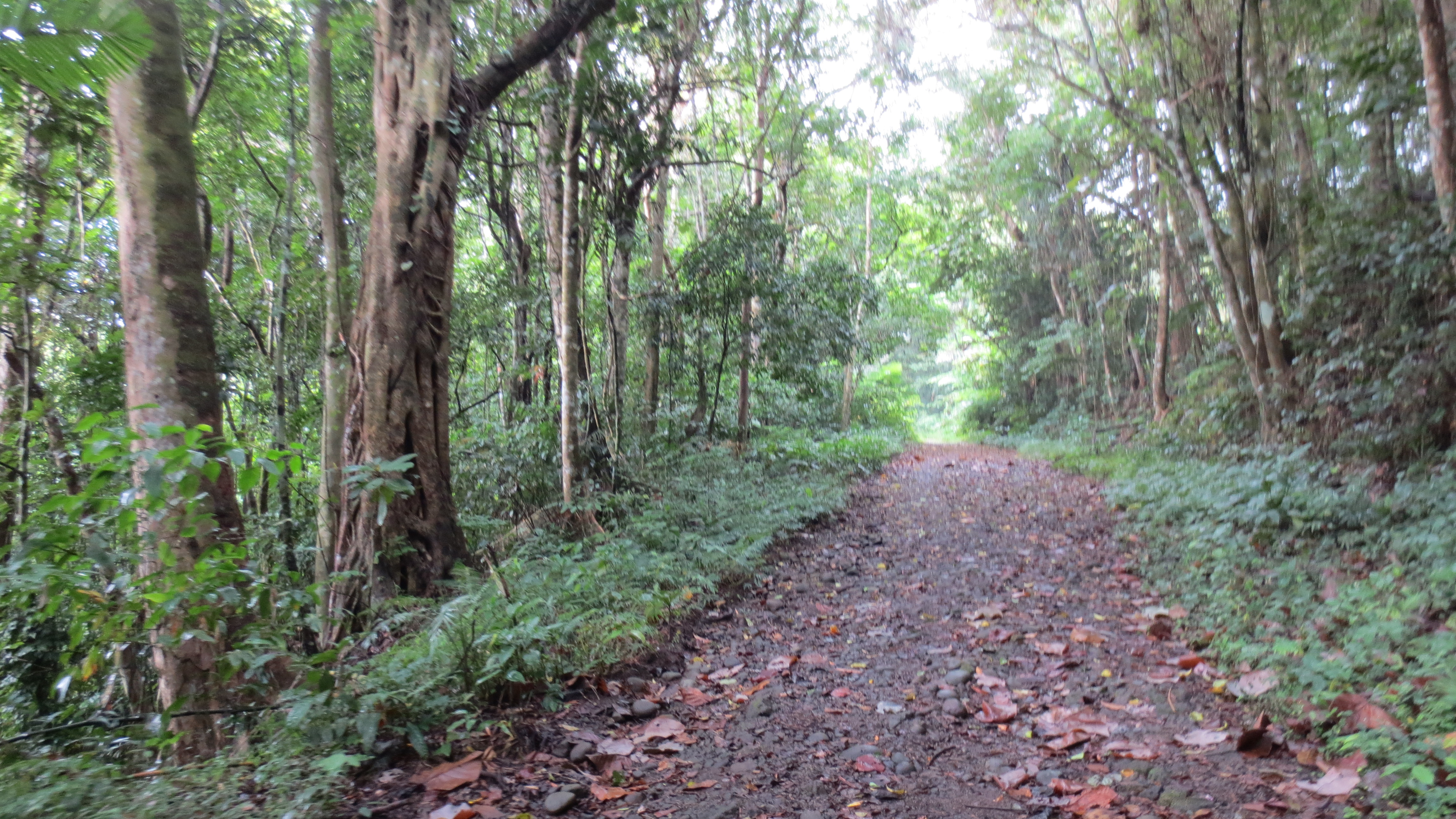
Old cobblestone path within Mount Makiling forest

Mt. Makiling is a popular hiking destination. The two major trails begin at the UPLB College of Forestry and Brgy. San Miguel, Santo Tomas, Batangas. The UPLB trail is more commonly used, taking 4–5 hours to reach the summit (Peak 2). This trail was closed in October 2007 due to trail damage wrought by Typhoon Xangsane in September 2006. The trail was closed again in December 2012 after two students were found drowned in a restricted area on the mountain. The trail was re-opened most recently in March 2013. The second trail, known as Maktrav, starts in Santo Tomas. This route is more difficult and requires 6–7 hours to reach the summit. Both trails are generally established and safe, although throughout the years there have been occasional reports of fatal accidents and injuries, especially on the Santo Tomas side. Climbers also frequently encounter leeches along the way.

== See also ==
- Laguna de Bay
- Laguna Volcanic Field
- Mount Banahaw
- Mounts Banahaw–San Cristobal Protected Landscape
- Malepunyo Mountain Range

== Bibliography ==
- "San Pablo Volcanic Field". Global Volcanism Program. Smithsonian Institution. (includes Makiling)
- Flood, T. P.; Patino, L. C.; Vogel, T. A.; Arcilla, C.; Stimac, J. A.; Maximo, R. R.; Arpa, M. B. (December 2002). The origin of the silicic domes in the Macolod Corridor, Philippines. Fall Meeting 2002. American Geophysical Union. Bibcode:2002AGUFM.V12A1412F.
- "Geology of the Region: Region IV-A". Dovetail Ventures Asia Incorporated. 2011.
