= Langun-Gobingob Cave System =

Cave system in Calbiga, Samar, Philippines

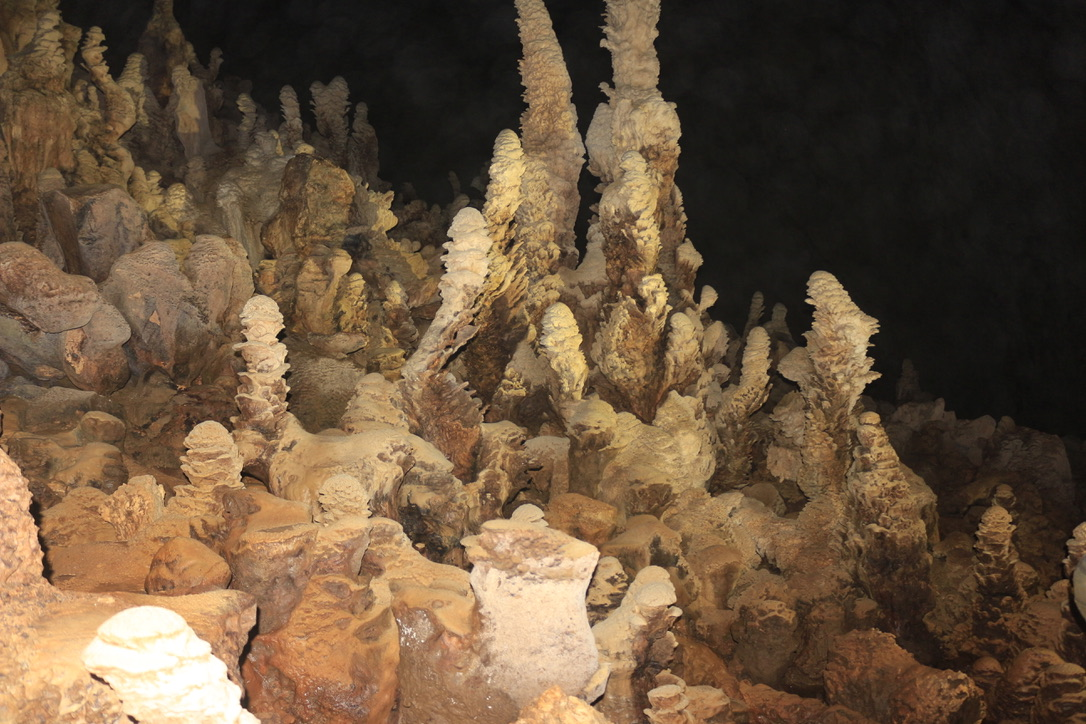
Sharp stalagmites at the floor of Langun-Gobingob cave

The Langun-Gobingob Cave System also known as Calbiga cave is a cave system located at Calbiga within the Samar Island Natural Park. It covers an area of approximately 2,968 hectares. The cave system has 12 caves including Langun, Gobingob, Lurodpon and Bitong Mahangin.
