= Maria Cacao =

Philippine goddess

Maria Cacao is the diwata or mountain goddess associated with Mount Lantoy in Argao, Cebu, Philippines. The Maria Cacao legend is a prominent example of the mountain goddess motif in Philippine mythology; other prominent examples being Maria Makiling of Los Baños and Maria Sinukuan of Mount Arayat.

== Origin ==
The original name of Maria Cacao is unknown as it was not recorded before the Spanish changed her name in a bid to convert the natives to Catholicism. It is widely assumed her name is not indigenous as "cacao" is an imported term that came from Latin America when the Spanish arrived. Additionally, the term "Maria" was added by the Spanish to turn her Catholic in a bid to widen Spanish rule in southern Cebu. Like with Makiling and Sinukuan, it is assumed that Maria Cacao's mythology was present prior to Spanish arrival with minor differences.

== Legend ==
The basic form of the Maria Cacao legend is that whenever rains flood the river that comes from Mount Lantoy, or a bridge is broken, this is a sign that Maria Cacao and her husband Mangao have either traveled down the river in their golden ship so that they can export their crops or traveled up the river on their way back. She is supposed to live inside a cave in the mountain and the cacao plants outside it are supposed to be her plantation.

=== Contemporary variants of the Maria Cacao legend ===
One contemporary evolution of the legend is its merger with another common Filipino mythological motif – that of soul-harvesting boats. The new stories suggest that borrowers who fail to pay their loans to the goddess would soon find themselves facing dire consequences, as Maria Cacao's boat comes to take their souls to the next world.

A very specific variant of this new element of the myth was reported in Cagayan de Oro in the aftermath of Typhoon Sendong (Tropical Storm Washi) when there were reported sightings of a boat with a woman at the helm traveling along the river and offering to pick up passengers. These rumors were accompanied by a warning not to accept invitations to board the boat because the woman was supposedly Maria Cacao "collecting souls for the next world." In his regular newspaper column, anthropologist Michael Tan noted that this "soul harvester" function wasn't part of the prototypical myth and associated the evolution of the myth with the social need to invent stories as a means of coping with disaster, creating a context for the sense of despair and, to some degree, offering a scapegoat for the situation. It is also possible that the legend might have been influenced by Magwayen, the Visayan goddess of the sea and death, as both share some elements (i.e. being aboard a water vessel, being female goddesses who bless people with bounty).

== Interpretations and cultural significance ==
While the story is obviously mythical in nature and a colonial invention, it is cited as evidence of how long the production of tableya has been going on in the area. Tableya is Cebuano (from Spanish tablilla) for round, unsweetened chocolate tablets made from cacao beans. It is a crucial ingredient in the Filipino delicacies sikwate (hot chocolate) and champorado.
