= Maria Sinukuan =

Philippine god of war and death

Apúng Sinukuan/Maria Sinukuan
- Gender: Male or Female

Apúng Sinukuan is the Kapampangan sun god, war god and death god who lived on Mount Arayat. During the colonial period, the Spanish rebranded him into Maria Sinukuan, the diwata or mountain goddess associated with Mount Arayat in Pampanga, Philippines, and later became a prominent example of the mountain goddess motif in Philippine mythology; other prominent examples being Maria Makiling of Los Baños and Maria Cacao of Cebu.

== Origin of Sinukuan ==
Prior to Spanish colonization, Sinukuan was known as a powerful male Kapampangan god named Aring Sinukûan who was on par with the Kapampangan god of Pinatubo, Apûng Malyari. The two were the second most powerful deities in Kampampangan mythology, next only to Mangechay (sometimes called Mangacha), the great elder and creator goddess. Aring Sinukûan was the sun god of war and death, taught the early inhabitants the industry of metallurgy, woodcutting, rice culture, and waging war. He had three children, namely, Munag Sumalâ, the golden serpent god who represented dawn; Lakandanup, the god of gluttony who represented the sun at noontime; and Gatpanapun, the noble god who only knew pleasure and represented the afternoon. He also had a winged assistant named Galurâ, a giant eagle deity believed to be the bringer of storms, and a wife named Mingan. However, when the Spanish arrived, they rebranded Sinukuan as a woman, thinking that the people would not revere the deity if he was a female, not knowing that the great elder deity of the Kapampangan was a goddess named Mangechay. Additionally, Sinukuan's wife, Mingan, was rebranded as male. Despite this, the natives continued to revere Sinukuan. Furious, the Spanish added "Maria" to Sinukuan's name to somewhat turn her Catholic in a bid to further subjugate the natives and convert them to Roman Catholicism.

== Later legend as Maria Sinukuan ==
The basic legend is similar to those of many mountain guardian goddesses, notably Maria Makiling.

Sinukuan is associated with the unusual bounty of the forests in Arayat and with the profusion of animals there. Watching over the needs of the people in the nearby town, she used to regularly leave fruits and animals at the doorstep of locals who needed food during hard times. At one point, though, a group of young men got greedy. They sought out where Sinukuan's home was in the mountains and when they found it, they asked for more than what they actually needed. Sinukuan did not object to this and allowed them to pick a great load of fruits. She warned them, however, not to get any fruits from the forest without her permission. On their way back home, they decided they would get more. "Why not?" they asked each other. "She won't know we took home fruits and animals. They're so plentiful, she won't know the difference." But she did. As soon as they had started picking more fruit, their packs began to feel heavier. They soon discovered that all the fruit and meat they were carrying had turned into rocks. The young men ran away, but before they managed to escape the forest, Sinukuan appeared before them. As punishment, she said, she would turn them into swine. And she did.

But the other people in the village were also getting greedy. More and more, they stole from Sinukuan's forests. Angered, Sinukuan stopped leaving food at their doorsteps. She made the fruit trees and animals in the mountain to disappear. And she also never allowed the villagers to see her again.

== Appearance ==
Local tradition describes Sinukuan, the Spanish-imposed female counterpart, as:

Her black hair… naturally curled, reaches down to her ankles. Her eyes are framed by long lashes which are black. Her eyebrows are arched. Her nose which is beautifully neither too high nor too flat is finely chiseled. Her lips are well formed. Her skin is a flawless brown. Her clothes are made of white flowing robe.

== In popular culture ==
Sinukuan or Sinyang, Kunnie, and Aning is a fictional character in Dyosa, a telefantasya being aired by ABS-CBN Network, portrayed by Filipino actress Mickey Ferriols.

Mariang Sinukuan is a fictional character voiced by Kylie Padilla with her animals Kuneho (Pekto) and Hunyango (John Feir) in Alamat by GMA Network.
