= Mount Lantoy =

Mountain in the Philippines

- Location within Visayas Location within Philippines

Highest point
- Elevation: 593 m (1,946 ft)
- Coordinates: 9°59′00″N 123°33′11″E

Geography
- Country: Philippines
- Region: Central Visayas
- Province: Cebu
- City/municipality: Argao

Mount Lantoy is a 593-metre (1,946 ft) mountain located 10 kilometres (6.2 mi) inland from the municipality of Argao, Cebu in the Philippines.

== Watershed forest reserve ==
Mt. Lantoy was declared as a watershed forest reserve by virtue of Presidential Proclamation No. 414 on June 29, 1994. The initial 7,265-hectare (17,950-acre) protected area was reduced in December 2006 via a new Executive Order issued by President Gloria Macapagal Arroyo, reducing the watershed reserve area coverage to 3,000 hectares (7,400 acres).

== In Philippine mythology ==
In Philippine mythology, Mount Lantoy is said to be the domain of Maria Cacao, a diwata who lives in a cave in the mountain. Outside her cave grow numerous cacao trees, which are said to be her plantation. After harvest time come rains that wash down the mountain, enabling Maria Cacao to float down to the towns below in her golden ship to sell her products.

The original name of the Maria Cacao is unknown as it was not recorded before the Spanish changed her name in a bid to instill Roman Catholicism in the natives. But it is widely assumed her name is not indigenous as 'Cacao' is an imported term that came from Latin America when the Spanish arrived. Additionally, the term 'Maria' was added by the Spanish to turn her into 'Catholic', in an effort to widen Spanish rule in southern Cebu.
